= Flora of Malta =

Plants found in Malta

Typical flora of Malta consist of the following plants. While small compared to other countries, the Maltese Islands contain flowers that grow on Malta, Gozo, Comino, Filfla, St Paul's Islands and Fungus Rock. Many of the species are endemic to Malta.

== A ==
Image	Species name	Synonym or subspecies	Common name	Maltese name	Ref
	Abutilon theophrasti	Abutilon avicennae	Velvetleaf		
	Acacia cyclops		Western coastal wattle	Akaċja tal-Għajn	
	Acacia farnesiana	Mimosa farnesiana	Sweet acacia	Akaċja tax-xewk żgħir	
Vachellia karroo S-0008 12329	Vachellia karroo	Acacia karroo	Karroo thorn	Gażżija tax-xewk	
	Acacia saligna	Acacia cyanophylla	Blue-leaved acacia	Akaċja	
	Acanthocereus tetragonus	Acanthocereus pentagonus	Barbed wire cereus		
	Acanthus mollis	Acanthus spinulosus	Bear's breeches	Ħannewija	
	Acanthus spinosus	Acanthus spinosissimus	Spiny bear's breeches	Ħannewija xewwikija	
	Achillea collina	Achillea millefolium var. collina	Mountain yarrow		
	Achillea ligustica		Ligurian yarrow		
	Achyranthes aspera var. sicula	Achyranthes sicula	Devil's horsewhip		
	Adiantum capillus-veneris	Adiantum michelii	Maidenhair fern	Tursin il-Bir	
	Adonis aestivalis subsp. squarrosa	Adonis squarrosa	Summer pheasant's-eye		
	Adonis microcarpa		Pheasant's-eye	Għajn is-Serduq	
	Aegilops geniculata	Triticum vagans	Goat grass	Brimba	
	Aeluropus lagopoides	Dactylis lagopoides	Cat's foot grass	Sieq il-qattus	
	Aeonium arboreum	Sempervivum arboreum	Tree houseleek	Kalluwa	
	Aetheorrhiza bulbosa	Crepis bulbosa	Bulbous hawk's-beard	Qanċlita perenni	
	Agave americana		American agave	Sabbara tal-Amerika	
	Agave americana var. marginata	Agave complicata	Agave	Sabbara tal-Amerika	
	Agave attenuata	Agave cernua	Soft-leaved agave		
	Agave parryi	Agave patonii	Parry's agave		
	Agave sisalana	Agave rigida var. sisalana	Blue agave	Sabbara ta' Sisal	
	Agrostis stolonifera	Agrostis alba subsp. stolonifera	Creeping bentgrass		
	Ailanthus altissima	Ailanthus glandulosa	Tree of heaven	Xumakk falz	
	Aira cupaniana	Avena cupaniana	Southern hairgrass	Ħaxixa rqiqa ta' Kupani	
	Aira elegans	Aira elegans subsp. ambigua	Mediterranean hairgrass	Ħaxixa Irqiqa fiddinija	
	Ajuga iva subsp. iva		Southern bugle	Xantkura	
	Ajuga iva subsp. pseudoiva	Ajuga iva subsp. Pseudoiva	Yellow southern bugle	Xantkura safra	
	Albizia julibrissin	Acacia julibrissin	Silk tree		
	Alcea rosea	Alcea ficifolia	Common hollyhock	Bastun ta' San Ġuzepp	
	Alisma lanceolatum	Alisma stenophyllum	Spear-leaved water plantain	Biżbula tal-Ilma tal-werqa dejqa	
	Alisma plantago-aquatica	Alisma major	Water plantain	Biżbula tal-Ilma	
	Allium ampeloprasum	Porrum ampeloprasum	Broadleaf wild leek	Tewm selvaġġ	
	Allium cepa	Cepa vulgaris	Garden onion	Basla	
	Allium chamaemoly		Dwarf garlic	Tewm qerqni	
	Allium commutatum	Allium ampeloprasum var. commutatum	Maritime wild leek	Kurrat tax-xatt	
	Allium commutatum polyanthum		Hybrid sea leek	Kurrat tax-xatt bagħal	
	Allium longispathum	Allium dentiferum, Allium monspessulanum	Pale garlic	Tewm Safrani	
	Allium lojaconoi		Maltese Dwarf Garlic	Tewm irqiq ta' Malta	
	Allium neapolitanum	Allium amblyopetalum	Naples Leek	Kurrat ta' Napli	
	Allium nigrum	Molium nigrum	Black Garlic	Ċuplajs	
	Allium polyanthum	Allium ampeloprasum subsp. polyanthum	Many-flowered garlic	Kurrat selvaġġ	
	Allium roseum		Rosy Garlic	Tewm Ħamrani	
Allium sativum Woodwill 1793	Allium sativum	Porrum sativum	Garlic	Tewm	
	Allium sphaerocephalon subsp. arvense	Alium arvense	White round-headed garlic	Tewm ta' Għawdex	
	Allium sphaerocephalon subsp. sphaerocephalon	Allium rollii	Round-headed Leek	Tewm Kaħlani	
	Allium subhirsutum		Hairy Garlic	Tewm Muswaf	
	Allium subvillosum	Allium vernale	Spring Garlic	Tewm Muswaf Rari	
	Allium trifoliatum	Allium subhirsutum subsp. trifoliatum	Pink Garlic	Tewm tal-linja vjola	
	Allium triquetrum	Allium medium	Three-cornered Garlic		
	Aloe arborescens	Aloe mutabilis	Krantz Aloe		
	Aloe saponaria	Aloe maculata	Soap Aloe		
	Aloe vera	Aloe barbadensis	Yellow Aloe	Sabbara	
	Alopecurus myosuroides	Alopecurus agrestis	Slender Foxtail	Denb il-Ġurdien it-twil	
	Alopecurus pratensis	Alopecurus pratensis subsp. pseudonigricans	Meadow Foxtail	Denb il-Ġurdien	
	Althaea hirsuta		Hispid Marshmallow	Ħobbejża sufija	
	Amaranthus blitoides	Galliaria blitoides		Denb id-dib tal-ward ħamrani	
	Amaranthus blitum	Albersia blitum	Purple Amaranth	Denb id-dib tal-qsari	
	Amaranthus caudatus	Amaranthus mantegazzianus	Love-lies-bleeding	Denb id-dib lixx	
	Amaranthus cruentus	Amaranthus paniculatus	Red Amaranth	Denb id-dib vjola zgħir	
	Amaranthus deflexus	Albersia prostrata	Large-fruited Amaranth	Denb id-dib lixx	
	Amaranthus gangeticus	Amaranthus melancholicus	Elephant-head Amaranth	Denb id-dib vjola kbir	
	Amaranthus graecizans	Glomeraria graecizans	Spreading Pigweed	Ghobbejra ħamra	
	Amaranthus hybridus	Amaranthus chlorostachys	Prince's Feather Amaranth	Denb id-dib bagħal	
	Amaranthus muricatus	Euloxus muricatus	African Amaranth	Denb id-dib Afrikan	
	Amaranthus retroflexus	Galliaria retroflexa	Rough Pigweed	Denb id-dib xewwikija	
	Amaranthus tricolor	Amaranthus tristis	Joseph's Coat	Denb id-dib ta' tlett kuluri	
	Amaranthus viridis	Amaranthus gracilis	Slender Amaranth	Denb id-dib ħadra	
	Ambrosia maritima	Ambrosia senegalensis	Sea Ragweed	Ambrosja	
	Ammi majus	Ammi topalii	Bullwort	Dakra	
	Ammi visnaga	Daucus visnaga	Toothpick-plant	Busnaga	
	Ammoides pusilla	Seseli pusillum	Small Bullwort	Dakra żgħira	
	Ammophila arenaria subsp. arundinacea	Ammophila arundinacea	Marram Grass	Qasba tar-ramel	
	Ampelodesmos mauritanicus	Arundo mauritanica	Mauritanian Grass	Dis	
	Anacamptis collina	Orchis collina	Fan-Lipped Orchid	Orkida ħamra	
	Anacamptis fragrans	Orchis fragrans	Scented Bug Orchid	Orkida tfuħ	
	Anacamptis longicornu	Orchis longicornu	Horned Orchid	Orkida tal-qrun	
	Anacamptis morio	Orchis morio	Green-winged Orchid	Orkida tal-elmu	
	Anacamptis papilionacea	Orchis papilionacea	Pink Butterfly Orchid	Farfett	
	Anacamptis pyramidalis	Orchis pyramidalis	Pyramidal Orchid	Orkida piramidali	
	Anacamptis pyramidalis subsp. urvilleana	Anacamptis urvilleana	Maltese Pyramidal Orchid	Orkida piramidali ta' Malta	
	Anacyclus clavatus	Anacyclus tomentosus	White Anacyclus	Anaċiklus	
	Anacyclus radiatus		Yellow Anacyclus		
	Anagallis arvensis	Lysimachia arvensis	Scarlet Pimpernel	Ħarira ħamra	
	Anagyris foetida		Stinking Bean Trefoil	Fula tal-Klieb	
	Anchusa italica	Anchusa azurea	Italian Bugloss	Lsien il-Fart ikħal	
	Andrachne telephioides		Andrachne	Andrakne	
	Andropogon distachyos	Pollinia distachya	Bluestem Grass	Barrum aħmar	
	Andryala integrifolia		Common Andryala		
	Anemone coronaria		Crown Anemone	Kaħwiela	
	Anemone hortensis		Broad-leaved anemone	Kaħwiela ċara	
	Bromus diandrus	Anisantha diandra	Great brome	Bunexxief kbir	
	Bromus fasciculatus	Anisantha fasciculata	Mediterranean brome	Bunexxief żgħir	
	Bromus madritensis	Anisantha madritensis, Anisantha rubens	Compact brome	Bunexxief vjola	
	Bromus rigidus	Anisantha rigida	Ripgut brome	Bunexxief tar-ramel	
	Bromus sterilis	Anisantha sterilis	Barren brome		
	Anogramma leptophylla	Polypodium leptophyllum	Annual Maidenhair	Tursin ir-riħ	
	Anredera cordifolia	Boussingaultia cordifolia	Madeira Vine	Ħobbejża Falza	
	Anthemis arvensis		Corn Chamomille	Bebuna tar-raba	
	Anthemis cotula		Stinking Chamomille		
	Anthemis urvilleana	Anthemis secundiramea subsp. urvilleana	Maltese Sea Chamomille	Bebuna tal-Baħar	
	Anthoxanthum gracile		Slender Vernal Grass		
	Anthoxanthum odoratum	Anthoxanthum nebrodense	Sweet Vernal Grass		
	Anthyllis hermanniae subsp. melitensis	Aspalathus cretica	Maltese Yellow Kidney Vetch	Ħatba s-sewda ta' Malta	
	Anthyllis vulneraria subsp. maura	Anthyllis maritima	Common Kidney Vetch	Silla tal-blat	
	Antirrhinum siculum	Antirrhinum majus subsp. Siculum	Sicilian Snapdragon	Papoċċi bojod	
	Antirrhinum tortuosum	Antirrhinum majus subsp. tortuosum	Greater Snapdragon	Papoċċi ħomor	
	Apium graveolens	Apium dulce	Wild Celery	Karfus	
	Apium nodiflorum	Helosciadium nodiflorum	Fool's Water Cress	Karfus tal-ilma	
	Araucaria bidwillii		Bunya pine	Awrikarja ta' Bidwill	
	Araucaria heterophylla	Araucaria excelsa	Norfolk Island pine	Awrikarja kbira	
	Arbutus unedo		Strawberry Tree	Imbrijagla	
	Arenaria serpyllifolia		Thyme-leaved Sandwort		
	Argyranthemum frutescens	Chrysanthemum frutescens	Marguerite Daisy		
	Arisarum vulgare	Arum arisarum	Friar's Cowl	Garni tal-Pipa	
	Aristolochia clusii		Green-flowered Birthwort	Papra selvaġġa	
	Artemisia absinthium		Wormwood	Assenzju	
	Artemisia arborescens		Silver Wormwood		
	Arthrocnemum macrostachyum	Salicornia macrostachya	Glaucous Glasswort	Almeridja tal-blat	
	Arum italicum		Italian lords-and-ladies	Garni	
	Arundo donax	Arundo scriptoria	Great Reed	Qasba	
	Arundo plinii	Arundo mediterranea	False Reed	Għaljun	
	Asparagus aphyllus		Mediterranean Asparagus	Spraġġ xewwieki	
	Asparagus asparagoides	Asparagus medeoloides	African Asparagus		
	Asparagus densiflorus	Asparagus plumosus subsp. nanus	Bushy Asparagus		
	Asparagus falcatus		Asparagus Fern		
	Asparagus officinalis		Wild Asparagus	Spraġġ	
	Asparagus setaceus	Asparagus plumosus	Plumose Asparagus		
	Asparagus stipularis	Asparagus horridus	Grey Asparagus	Spraġġ griż	
	Asparagus virgatus	Protasparagus virgatus	Broom Asparagus		
	Asperula aristata subsp. scabra	Asperula cynanchica var. aristata	Southern Squinancywort	Asperula	
	Asperula cynanchica		Squinancywort		
	Asphodelus fistulosus	Asphodelus tenuifolius	Onion Weed	Berwieq Żgħir	
	Asphodelus ramosus	Asphodelus aestivus	Branched Asphodel	Berwieq	
	Asplenium ceterach	Ceterech officinarum	Rusty-back Fern	Felċi tal-Ħitan tas-Sejjieħ	
	Asplenium marinum		Sea Spleenwort Fern	Felċi tal-Baħar	
	Asplenium sagittatum	Phyllitis sagittata	Mule's Fern	Felċi tal-bir	
	Asplenium trichomanes		Maidenhair Spleenwort Fern	Felċi rqiqa	
	Aster squamatus		Narrow-leaved Aster	Settembrina salvaġġa	
	Astragalus boeticus	Astragalus baeticus	Yellow Milk Vetch	Kafe' Messikan	
	Astragalus hamosus	Astragalus buceras	Southern Milk Vetch	Ġilbiena bajda	
	Astragalus sesameus	Astragalus saguntinus	Small-flowered Milk Vetch		
	Atractylis cancellata		Cage Thistle	Xewk tal-gaġġa	
	Atractylis gummifera	Carlina gummifera	Stemless Atractylis	Xewk tal-mixta	
	Atriplex glabriuscula	Atriplex patula subsp. glabriuscula	Babington's Orache	Bjanka lixxa	
	Atriplex halimus	Atriplex halimoides	Shrubby Orache	Bjanka	
	Atriplex lanfrancoi	Cremnophyton lanfrancoi	Maltese Cliff Orache	Bjanka tal-irdum	
	Atriplex patula	Atriplex erecta	Common Orache	Bjanka skarza	
	Atriplex prostrata	Atriplex triangularis	Spear-leaved Orache	Selq il-baħar	
	Atriplex rosea	Atriplex foliolosa	Rosy Orache	Selq tal-werqa roża	
	Austrocylindropuntia subulata	Opuntia subulata	Eve's Needle		
	Avellinia festucoides	Avellinia michelii	Michel's Grass		
	Avena barbata subsp. barbata	Avena hirsuta	Barbed Oat	Ħafur żgħir	
	Avena barbata subsp. wiestii	Avena wiestii	Wiesti's Barbed Oat	Ħafur żgħir ta' Wiesti	
	Avena fatua	Avena sativa subsp. fatua	Common Wild Oat	Ħafur tal-Ewropa	
	Avena sativa	Avena orientalis	Oat	Ħafur tal-egħlieqi	
	Avena sterilis subsp. atherantha	Avena altherantha	Sterile oat	Ħafur kbir rari	
	Avena sterilis subsp. ludoviciana	Avena ludoviciana	Ludovic's Sterile Oat	Ħafur kbir ta' Ludovik	
	Avena sterilis subsp. sterilis		Animated Oat	Ħafur kbir	

== B ==
Image	Species name	Synonym	Common name	Maltese name	Ref
	Ballota nigra subsp. uncinata		Black Horehound	Marrubja sewda	
	Bambusa vulgaris		Common Bamboo	Bambu	
	Bartsia trixago	Bellardia trixago	Mediterranean lineseed	Perlina bajda	
	Bassia scoparia	Chenopodium scoparia	Summer cypress		
	Bellevalia romana	Hyacinthus romana	Roman Hyacinth	Ġjacint selvaġġ	
	Bellis annua		Annual Daisy	Bebuna	
	Bellis sylvestris		Southern Daisy	Margerita salvaġġa	
	Beta vulgaris subsp. maritima	Beta maritima	Sea Beet	Selq tal-kosta	
	Beta vulgaris subsp. vulgaris	Beta cicla	Wild Beet	Selq	
	Bifora radians	Coriandrum radians	Mediterranean Bifora	Kosbor selvaġġ	
	Biscutella didyma subsp. didyma		Buckler Mustard	Xeħt il-forom	
	Bituminaria bituminosa	Psoralea bituminosa	Pitch Trefoil	Silla tal-mogħoż	
	Blackstonia perfoliata subsp. perfoliata		Yellow-Wort	Ċentawrija safra	
	Borago officinalis		Common Borage	Fidloqqom	
	Bothriochloa ischaemum	Andropogon ischaemum	Yellow Blue Stem Grass		
	Bougainvillea glabra		Lesser Bougainvillea	Buganvilla żgħira	
	Bougainvillea spectabilis		Bougainvillea	Buganvilla	
	Brachychiton populneus		Kurrajong		
	Brachypodium distachyon	Trachynia distachya	Trachynia Grass	Għomma żgħira	
	Brachypodium hybridum		Hybridous Mediterranean false brome	Pinna bagħal	
	Brachypodium retusum	Bromus retusus	Mediterranean false brome	Pinna	
	Brachypodium sylvaticum	Festuca sylvatica	False Brome	Bunixxief tad-dell	
	Brassica napus subsp. oleifera	Brassica rapa subsp. napus	Rapeseed	Nevew	
	Brassica nigra	Brassica bracteolata	Black Mustard	Mustarda sewda	
	Brassica oleracea s.l.		Wild cabbage	Kaboċċa selvaġġa	
	Brassica rapa subsp. sylvestris		Wild Turnip	Liftija	
	Brassica tournefortii	Erucastrum minutiflorum	Tournefort's Cabbage	Kaboċċa ta' Twurneforti	
	Briza maxima	Macrobriza maxima	Quaking Grass	Beżżulett il-Qattusa	
	Briza minor		Pearl Grass	Beżżulett il-Qattusa żgħira	
	Bromus alopecuros	Serrafalcus alopecuros	Weedy brome	Ħurtan dejjaq	
	Bromus commutatus subsp. neglectus	Bromus neglectus	Mediterranean meadow brome	Ħurtan tal-Mediterran	
	Bromus hordeaceus subsp. hordeaceus	Bromus mollis	Soft-Brome	Ħurtan	
	Bromus hordeaceus subsp. molliformis	Bromus molliformis	Southern Brome	Ħurtan żgħir	
	Bromus intermedius	Serrafalcus intermedius	Intermediate Brome		
	Bromus lanceolatus	Bromus divaricatus	Woolly Brome	Ħurtan Sufi	
	Bromus racemosus	Serrafalcus racemosus	Smooth brome	Ħurtan lixx	
	Broussonetia papyrifera		Paper mulberry		
	Buddleja madagascariensis	Nicodemia madagascariensis	Madagascan butterfly bush		
	Bupleurum lancifolium	Bupleurum heterophyllum	Lanceleaf thorow-wax	Widnet il-fenek	
	Bupleurum semicompositum	Bupleurum glaucum	Dwarf hare's ear		

== C ==
Image	Species name	Synonym	Common name	Maltese name	Ref
	Cakile maritima		Sea rocket	Kromb il-baħar	
	Calendula arvensis subsp. arvensis		Field marigold	Suffejra tar-raba	
	Calendula arvensis subsp. arvensis var. bicolor	Calendula arvensis subsp. aegyptiaca	Field two-coloured marigold	Suffejra tar-raba ta' giex kuluri	
	Calendula bicolor		Star marigold	Suffejra ta' giex kuluri	
	Calendula maritima		Sea marigold	Suffejra tal-Baħar	
	Calendula officinalis		Pot marigold	Suffejra tal-ġonna	
	Calendula stellata	Calendula cornuta	Sicilian marigold	Suffejra ta' Sqallija	
	Calendula suffruticosa subsp. fulgida		Woody Marigold	Suffejra	
	Callistemon citrinus	Callistemon lanceolatus	Crimson Bottlebrush		
	Callitriche truncata		Southern Water Starwort	Erba Gamberaja	
	Calystegia lucana	Calystegia sepium × silvatica	Hybrid bindweed	Leblieb bagħal	
	Calystegia sepium	Convolvulus sepium	Hedge bindweed	Leblieb kbir roża	
	Calystegia silvatica	Convolvulus silvaticus	Great bindweed	Leblieb kbir	
	Calystegia soldanella	Convolvulus soldanella	Sea bindweed	Leblieb tar-ramel	
	Campanula erinus		Small Bellflower	Kampanula	
	Capparis orientalis	Capparis spinosa subsp. rupestris	Caper bush	Kappar	
	Capparis spinosa	Capparis parviflora	Spiny Caper	Kappar tax-xewk	
	Capsella bursa-pastoris	Capsella apetala	Shepherd's Purse	Ġarġir il-ġemel	
	Capsella rubella	Capsella bursa-pastoris var. rubella	Red Shepherd's Purse	Ġarġir il-ġemel ħamra	
	Cardamine flexuosa	Cardamine hirsuta subsp. flexuosa	Wavy Bittercress		
	Cardamine hirsuta	Cardamine umbrosa	Hairy Bittercress		
	Cardaria draba subsp. draba	Lepidium draba	Whitetop Plant		
	Cardiospermum grandiflorum	Cardiospermum hirsutum	Love-in-a-puff	Sfineġ Sufi	
	Cardiospermum halicacabum		Showy Balloon Vine	Sfineġ	
	Carduus pycnocephalus subsp. marmoratus	Carduus arabicus	Arabian Thistle	Ħorfox	
	Carduus pycnocephalus subsp. pycnocephalus		Plymouth Thistle	Xewk tal-fjura żgħira	
	Carduus tenuiflorus	Carduus pycnocephalus var. tenuiflorus	Winged Plumeless Thistle	Xewk tal-fjura żgħira	
	Carex distans		Distant Sedge	Sogħda	
	Carex divisa		Divided Sedge	Sogħda kommuni	
	Carex divulsa	Carex muricata var. divulsa	Grey Sedge	Sogħda mifruda	
	Carex extensa		Long-bracted Sedge	Sogħda tal-baħar	
	Carex flacca subsp. erythrostachys	Carex flacca subsp. serrulata	Glacuous Sedge	Sogħda tax-xagħri	
	Carex halleriana	Carex alpestris	Southern Sedge		
	Carex hispida		Hispid Sedge	Sogħda tat-tafal	
	Carex otrubae	Carex cuprina	False Fox Sedge	Sogħda kompatta	
	Carex pairae	Carex muricata subsp. lamprocarpa	Paira's rough sedge		
	Carlina involucrata	Carlina corymbosa subsp. involucrata	African Carline Thistle	Sajtun	
	Carlina lanata		Wooly Carline Thistle	Sebqet 'l Ommha	
	Carpobrotus acinaciformis	Mesembryanthemum acinaciforme	Glaucous Hottenot Fig	Xuxet San Ġwann rari	
	Carpobrotus edulis	Mesembryanthemum edule	Hottenot Fig	Xuxet San Ġwann	
	Carthamus caeruleus	Carthamus tingitanus	Blue Thistle	Xewk ikhal	
	Carthamus lanatus		Woolly Carthamus	Xewk ta' Kristu	
	Carthamus tinctorius		Orange Carthamus	Għosfor	
	Carya illinoinensis	Carya illinoinensis	Pecan	Ġewża tal-Pekan	
	Casuarina cunninghamiana	Casuarina tenuissima	Australian River Oak		
	Casuarina equisetifolia	Casuarina litorea	She-oak	Kaswarina	
	Casuarina verticillata	Casuarina stricta	Drooping she-oak	Kaswarina	
	Catabrosa aquatica	Aira aquatica	Whorl-Grass	Katabrosa	
	Catananche lutea		Yellow Catananche	Katananċe	
	Catapodium marinum	Festuca marina	Sea Fern Grass	Żwien tax-xatt	
	Catapodium rigidum	Poa rigida	Fern-Grass	Żwien	
	Catapodium zwierleinii	Scleropoa zwierleinii	Zwierlein's Fern Grass	Żwien ta' Żwierlein	
	Ceiba speciosa	Chorisia speciosa	Floss-silk Tree		
	Celtis australis		Southern Nettle Tree	Bagular	
	Cenchrus echinatus		Southern Sandspur	Qanfuda	
	Centaurea acaulis		Stemless Star-Thistle	Ċentawrija tan-nuffara	
	Centaurea calcitrapa		Red Star-Thistle		
	Centaurea cyanus		Cornflower		
	Centaurea diluta		North African Knapweed	Xewk tal-Afrika ta' fuq	
	Centaurea hyalolepis	Centaurea pallescens	Yellow Star-Thistle		
	Centaurea jacea		Brownray Knapweed		
	Centaurea melitensis		Maltese Star-Thistle	Xewk ta' Malta	
	Centaurea nicaeensis		Mediterranean Star-Thistle	Xewk tal-għotba	
	Centaurea ragusina	Centaurea candidissima	Croatian Centaury		
	Centaurea solstitialis		Yellow Star-Thistle		
	Centaurium erythraea	Erythraea centaurium	Common Centaury	Ċentawrija kbira	
	Centaurium pulchellum	Erythraea pulchellum	Lesser Centaury	Ċentawrija żgħira	
	Centaurium spicatum	Schenkia spicata	Spiked Centaury	Ċentawrija tal-virga	
	Centaurium tenuiflorum	Erythraea pulchellum var. tenuiflorum	Slender Centaury	Ċentawrija rqiqa	
	Centranthus calcitrapae		Annual Valerian	Valeriana Roża	
	Centranthus macrosiphon		Long-spurred Valerian		
	Centranthus ruber		Red Valerian	Toppu tar-reġina	
	Cerastium brachypetalum		Grey Mouse-Ear	Widen il-ġurdien abjad	
	Cerastium glomeratum	Cerastium acutatum	Broad-leaved Mouse-Ear	Widen il-ġurdien idellek	
	Cerastium ligusticum		Large-flowered Mouse-Ear		
	Ceratochloa cathartica	Bromus catharticus	Rescue grass	Ħurtan Amerikan	
	Ceratonia siliqua		Carob	Ħarruba	
	Cercis siliquastrum		Judas Tree	Siġra ta' Ġuda	
	Cerinthe major		Honeywort	Qniepen	
	Chaenorhinum minus	Linaria minor	Dwarf Snapdragon		
	Chamaerops humilis		Dwarf Fan Palm	Ġummara	
	Chasmanthe floribunda	Antholyza floribunda	African Flag	Kasmanti	
	Cheirolophus crassifolius	Palaeocyanus crassifolius	Maltese Rock-Centaury	Widnet il-Baħar	
	Chelidonium majus		Greater Celandine	Ħaxixa tal-felul	
	Chenopodiastrum hybridum	Chenopodium hybridum	Maple-leaved goosefoot		
	Chenopodiastrum murale	Chenopodium murale	Nettle-leaved Goosefoot	Għobbejra ħadra	
	Chenopodium album subsp. album	Chenopodium viride	Fat Hen	Għobbejra Bajdanija	
	Chenopodium album subsp. amaranticolor	Chenopodium giganteum	Tree Spinach		
	Chenopodium ambrosioides	Dysphania ambrosioides	Mexican Tea	Għobbejra Tfuħ Te' Falz	
	Chenopodium ficifolium	Anserina ficifolia	Fig-leaved Goosefoot		
	Chenopodium opulifolium	Chenopodium album subsp. opulifolium	Grey Goosefoot	Għobbejra griża	
	Chenopodium strictum	Chenopodium album subsp. striatum	Striated Fat Hen	Għobbejra bajdanija strixxata	
	Chenopodium vulvaria	Chenopodium foetidum	Stinking Goosefoot	Għobbejra tinten	
	Chiliadenus bocconei	Chiliadenus bocconei	Maltese Fleabane	Tulliera ta' Malta	
	Chlorophytum comosum	Anthericum comosum	Spider Plant	Rampila	
	Chondrilla juncea		Rush-leaved sow thistle	Tfief tar-ramel	
	Chrozophora tinctoria		Dyer's Litmus	Turnasol	
	Chrysanthemum zawadskii subsp. coreanum	Chrysanthemum coreanum	Korean Chrysanthemun		
	Cichorium endivia		Endive	Indivja	
	Cichorium intybus		Chicory	Ċikwejra	
	Cichorium spinosum		Spiny Chicory	Qanfuda	
	Cistus creticus	Cistus incanus subsp. Creticus	Hoary Rockrose	Ċistu roża	
	Cistus monspeliensis	Stephanocarpus monspeliensis	White Rockrose	Ċistu abjad	
	Citrus limon	Citrus x limon	Lemon	Siġra tal-lumi	
	Clematis cirrhosa		Evergreen Traveller's Joy	Kiesħa jew Bajda	
	Clinopodium nepeta	Calamintha nepeta	Lesser calamint	Kalaminta	
	Coix lacryma-jobi		Job's Tears	Dmugh ta' Ġuno	
	Colchicum cupanii	Colchicum bertolonii	Mediterranean meadow saffron	Busieq	
	Colocasia antiquorum		Elephants Ear	Għorgħar	
	Conium maculatum	Conium divaricatum	Hemlock	Ċikuta	
	Conringia orientalis	Conringia austriaca	Hare's Ear Mustard		
	Convolvulus althaeoides subsp. althaeoides		Mallow bindweed	Leblieb tax-xagħri roża	
	Convolvulus althaeoides subsp. tenuissimus	Convolvulus elegantissimus	Silvery Mallow-Leaved BindWeed	Leblieba tax-xagħri ċar	
	Convolvulus arvensis	Convolvulus auriculatus	Field BindWeed	Leblieb tar-raba	
	Convolvulus cantabrica	Convolvulus terrestris	Cantabrican morning glory	Leblieb skars	
	Convolvulus lineatus	Convolvulus intermedius	Narrow-leaved bindweed	Leblieb abjad	
	Convolvulus oleifolius	Convolvulus linearis	Pink bindweed	Leblieb tal-irdum	
	Convolvulus pentapetaloides	Convolvulus arcuatus	Two-coloured bindweed	Leblieb żgħir	
	Convolvulus sabiatus	Convolvulus mauritanicus	Blue rock bindweed	Leblieb ta' Savona	
	Convolvulus siculus	Convolvulus ovatus	Blue bindweed	Leblieb tal-werqa tleqq	
	Convolvulus tricolor	Convolvulus cupanianus	Three-coloured bindweed	Leblieb ikħal	
	Conyza albida	Conyza sumatrensis	Fleabane		
	Conyza bonariensis		Flax-Leaved Fleabane	Żagħżigħa selvaġġa	
	Conyza canadensis	Erigeron canadensis	Canadian Horseweed		
	Coriandrum sativum	Selinum coriandrum	Coriander	Kosbor	
	Cornucopiae cucullatum		Hooded Grass	Ħaxix tal-Kornukopja	
	Coronilla scorpioides	Arthrolobium scorpioides	Yellow Crown Vetch	Xeħt l-imħabba	
	Coronilla valentina		Shrubby Crown Vetch	Koronilla	
	Coronopus didymus	Coronopus pinnatifida	Lesser Swine Cress	Koronopu tal-wied	
	Coronopus squamatus	Coronopus procumbens	Swine Cress	Koronopu	
	Cortaderia selloana	Arundo selloana	Dwarf Pampas Grass	Kortaderja	
	Crassula tillaea	Crassula muscosa	Mossy Stonecrop		
	Crassula vaillantii	Bulliarda vaillantii	Narrow-leaved Mossy Stonecrop		
	Crataegus azarolus	Mespilus azarolus	Crete Hawthorn	Għanżalor	
	Crataegus monogyna	Crataegus oxyacantha	Hawthorn	Żagħrun	
	Crataegus ruscinonensis		Hybrid Hawthorn	Għanżalor bagħal	
	Crepis bursifolia	Crepis ericafolia	Italian Hawksbeard		
	Crepis neglecta	Crepis cernua	Hawksbeard		
	Crepis pusilla	Melitella pusilla	Maltese Hawksbeard	Melitella	
	Crepis vesicaria subsp. hyemalis	Crepis hyemalis	Beaked Hawksbeard	Krepis Sqalli	
	Cressa cretica		Mediterranean bindweed	Kressa	
	Crithmum maritimum		Rock Samphire	Bużbież il-baħar	
	Crocus longiflorus	Crocus odorus	Yellow-throated Crocus	Żagħfran selvaġġ skars	
	Crucianella rupestris	Crucianella maritima var. rupestris	Rock Crucianella	Kruċanella	
	Crupina crupinastrum	Centaurea crupinastrum	Southern Crupina		
	Crypsis aculeata	Schoenus aculeatus	Pricklegrass	Kripsis tas-salmastru	
	Crypsis schoenoides	Phleum schoenoides	Swamp Picklegrass	Kripsis tal-ilma	
	Cucurbita pepo	Cucurbita aurantia	Pumpkin	Qargħa ħamra	
	Cupressus arizonica	Cupressus glabra	Arizona Cypress	Ċipress ta' Arizona	
	Cupressus sempervirens	Cupressus pyramidalis	Italian Cypress	Ċipress	
	Cuscuta campestris	Cuscuta pentagona	Western Field Dodder	Pittma tal-Amerika	
	Cuscuta epithymum		Dodder	Pittma	
	Cuscuta monogyna		One-seeded dodder		
	Cutandia maritima	Triticum maritimum	Cutandia Grass	Kutandja	
	Cydonia oblonga	Cydonia vulgaris	Quince	Sfarġel	
	Cymbalaria muralis	Linaria cymbalaria	Ivy-leaved Toadflax	Ċimbalarja	
	Cymodocea nodosa		Lesser Neptune Grass	Alka rqiqa	
	Cynara cardunculus	Cynara corsica	Wild Artichoke	Qaqoċċ tax-xewk	
	Cynara scolymus	Cynara cardunculus subsp. scolymus	Globe Artichoke	Qaqoċċ	
	Cynara scolymus cardunculus		Globe Artichoke (hybrid)	Qaqoċċ bagħal	
	Cynodon dactylon	Panicum dactylon	Bermuda Grass	Niġem	
	Cynoglossum creticum		Blue Hound's Tongue	Ilsien il-Kelb	
	Cynomorium coccineum		General's Root	Għerq il-ġeneral	
	Cynosurus cristatus		Crested Dog's Tail	Denb il-kelb	
	Cynosurus echinatus	Falona echinata	Rough Dog's Tail	Denb il-kelb xewwieki	
	Cyperus alternifolius		Umbrella Papyrus		
	Cyperus capitatus	Galilea mucronathus	Capitate Galingale	Bordi tar-ramel	
	Cyperus esculentus		Yellow Nutsedge		
	Cyperus fuscus	Cyperus compressus	Brown Galingale	Bordi żgħir	
	Cyperus involucratus	Cyperus flabelliformis	Dwarf Papyrus Grass		
	Cyperus longus subsp. badius	Cyperus longus subsp. badius	Compact Galingale	Bordi	
	Cyperus longus subsp. longus		Sweet Galingale	Bordi tal-widien	
	Cyperus papyrus		Papyrus	Papiru	
	Cyperus rotundus	Cyperus olivaris	Round Galingale	Bordi tat-toroq	
	Cyrtomium falcatum	Polystichum falcatum	Japanese Holly Fern	Felċi Ġappuniża	
	Cyrtomium fortunei	Polystichum fortunei	Asian Netvein Holly Fern	Felċi Asjatika	

== D ==
Image	Species name	Synonym	Common name	Maltese name	Ref
	Dactylis glomerta subsp. glomerata	Dactylis glaucescens	Cock's Foot Grass	Dekkuka	
	Dactylis glomerta subsp. hispanica	Dactylis hispanica	Spanish Cock's Foot	Dekkuka ta' Spanja	
	Dactyloctenium aegyptium	Cynosurus aegyptius	Egyptian Crofwoot Grass	Sieq iċ-ċawl Eġizjana	
	Damasonium bourgaei	Alisma bourgaei	Mediterranean Starfruit Plantain	Damażonju	
	Datura innoxia		Downy Thorn Apple	Siġret ir-rizzi	
	Datura stramonium		Common Thorn Apple		
	Datura tatula	Datura stramonium var. tatula	Devil's Trumpet		
	Daucus carota subsp. carota	Daucus foliosus	Wild Carrot	Zunnarija salvaġġa	
	Daucus carota subsp. sativus	Daucus sativus	Carrot	Zunnarija	
	Daucus gingidium	Daucus carota subsp. drepanensis	Sea Carrot	Zunnarija tal-baħar	
	Daucus lopadusanus	Daucus carota var. lopadusanus	Lampedusa Carrot	Zunnarija ta' Lampedusa	
	Daucus rupestris	Daucus carota var. rupestris	Cliff Carrot	Zunnarija tal-blat	
	Delosperma cooperi	Mesembryanthemum cooperi	Though Trailing Ice Plant		
	Delphinium halteratum	Delphinium longipes	Winged Larkspur	Sieq il-Ħamiema	
	Delphinium staphisagria		Short-spurred Larkspur	Żerrigħet il-qamel	
	Descurainia sophia	Sisymbrium sophia	Flixweed		
	Desmazeria pignattii		Pignatti's Fern Grass	Żwien ta' Malta	
	Digitaria ciliaris	Panicum ciliare	Southern Crab Grass	Diġitarja rqiqa	
	Digitaria sanguinalis	Panicum sanguinale	Crab Grass	Diġitarja ħamra	
	Diospyros kaki	Diospyros chinensis	Kaki	Kaki	
	Diospyros lotus		Date-Plum		
	Diplotaxis erucoides		White Wall Rocket	Ġarġir abjad	
	Diplotaxis tenuifolia	Diplotaxis fruticulosa	Perennial Wall Rocket	Ġarġir isfar	
	Diplotaxis viminea	Diplotaxis prolongoi	Southern Rocket	Aruka selvaġġa	
	Disphyma crassifolium	Mesembryanthemum crassifolium	Rounded Noon Flower		
	Dittrichia graveolens	Cupularia graveolens	Lesser Samphire	Żagħżigħa safra	
	Dittrichia viscosa	Cupularia viscosa	False Yellowhead	Tulliera komuni	
	Dodonaea viscosa	Dodonaea ehrenbergii	Hop Bush		
	Dracunculus vulgaris		Giant Lords-and-Ladies	Garni qoxret is-serp	
	Drimia pancration	Uriginea maritima	Sea Squill	Basal tal-għansar	
	Drosanthemum hispidum	Mesembryanthemum hispidum	Hairy Dewflower		
	Duranta repens	Duranta erecta	Golden Dewdrop		

== E ==
Image	Species name	Synonym	Common name	Maltese name	Ref
	Ecballium elaterium		Squirting Cucumber	Faqqus il-ħmir	
	Echinaria capitata	Cenchrus capitatus	Hedgehog Grass		
	Echinochloa colona	Panicum colonum	Millet Grass	Xrika	
	Echinochloa crus-galli	Panicum crus-galli	Cockspur	Xrika mlewna	
	Echinochloa frumentacea	Echinochloa crus-galli var. frumentacea	Barnyard Millet		
	Echinophora spinosa	Selinum spinosum	Prickly Parsnip	Bużbież xewwieki tar-ramel	
	Echinops siculus	Echinops ritros subsp. sicula	Sicilian Globe Thistle		
	Echium arenarium		Coastal Viper's Bugloss	Lsien il-fart tar-ramel	
	Echium candicans	Echium fastuasum	Pride of Madeira		
	Echium italicum		Pale Bugloss	Ilsien il-fart abjad	
	Echium parviflorum	Echium calycinum	Small-flowered Viper's Bugloss	Lsien il-fart żgħir	
	Echium plantagineum	Echium lycopsis	Purple Viper's Bugloss	Lsien il-fart vjola	
	Echium sabulicola		Sand Viper's Bugloss	Lsien il-fart tax-xatt	
	Eichhornia crassipes	Pontedera crassipes	Water Hyacinth		
	Elaeagnus angustifolia	Elaeagnus argentea	Russian olive		
	Elatine gussonei	Elatine hydropiper var. gussonei	Maltese Waterwort	Elatine	
	Eleocharis ovata		Southern Spikerush		
	Eleocharis palustris	Eleocharis intersita	Common Spikerush		
	Eleusine indica	Cynosurus indicus	Yard Grass	Elusin	
	Elytrigia atherica	Triticum athericum	Sea Couch Grass		
	Elytrigia juncea	Triticum junceum	Sand Couch Grass	Sikrana tar-ramel	
	Elytrigia repens	Triticum repens	Couch Grass	Sikrana skarsa	
	Elytrigia scirpea	Agropyron scirpeum	Flaccid-leaf Couch Grass	Sikana tal-bwar	
	Emex spinosa	Rumex spinosus	Spiny Dock	Selq xewwieki	
	Enarthrocarpus pterocarpus		Winged Radish	Ravanell tal-Eġittu	
	Ephedra fragilis		Joint-Pine	Efedra	
	Epilobium parviflorum		Hoary Willowherb		
	Epilobium tetragonum subsp. tournefortii	Epilobium adnatum	Square-stalked Willowherb	Epilobju	
	Equisetum ramosissimum	Equisetum campanulatum	Branched Horsetail	Denb iż-żiemel	
	Eragrostis cilianensis	Poa cilianensis	Stink Grass		
	Erica multiflora		Mediterranean Heath	Erika	
	Eriobotrya japonica		Loquat	Naspli	
	Erodium acaule	Erodium romanum	Stemless Storkbill		
	Erodium alnifolium	Erodium chium var. crassifolium	Alder-leaved storksbill		
	Erodium chium		Mediterranean Storkbill		
	Erodium ciconium	Erodium viscosum	Sand Storkbill		
	Erodium cicutarium		Common Storkbill		
	Erodium laciniatum	Erodium chium var. laciniatum	Cut-leaved Storkbill	Moxt tar-ramel	
	Erodium malacoides		Mallow-Leaved Stork's Bill	Moxt	
	Erodium moschatum		Musk Stork's Bill	Ħaxixa tal-Misk	
	Erophila verna	Draba verna	Common Whitlow Grass		
	Eruca sativa	Eruca vesicaria subsp. sativa	Salad Mustard	Aruka	
	Eryngium maritimum	Eryngium marinum	Sea Holly	Xewk ir-ramel	
	Erysimum cheiri	Cheiranthus cheiri	Wallflower	Ġiżi safra	
	Erythrostemon gilliesii	Caesalpinia gilliesii	Bird of paradise		
	Eucalyptus camaldulensis	Eucalyptus acuminata	Red Gum Eucalyptus	Ewkaliptus	
	Eucalyptus gomphocephala	Eucalyptus gomphocephala var. rhodoxylon	Tuart Tree	Ewkaliptus	
	Eucalyptus leucoxylon		Blue gum	Ewkaliptus	
	Eupatorium cannabinum	Eupatorium ponticum	Hemp-Agrimony		
	Euphorbia aleppica		Aleppo Spurge		
	Euphorbia chamaesyce	Chamaesyce canescens	Small Spurge	Ġemmugħa	
	Euphorbia characias		Large Mediterranean Spurge	Tengħud tal-Ħaġar	
	Euphorbia dendroides		Tree Spurge	Tengħud tas-Siġra	
	Euphorbia exigua		Dwarf Spurge	Tenghud Irqiq	
	Euphorbia helioscopia		Sun Spurge	Tengħud Raddiena	
	Euphorbia hirsuta	Euphorbia pubescens	Hairy Spurge		
	Euphorbia maculata	Chamaesyce maculata	Spotted Spurge	Ġemmugħa ħamra	
	Euphorbia mauritanica		Smooth Creeping Milkweed		
	Euphorbia melapetala	Euphorbia characias var. melapetala	Large Sicilian Spurge	Tengħud tal-Ħaġar Sqalli	
	Euphorbia melitensis		Maltese Spurge	Tengħud tax-Xagħri	
	Euphorbia paralias		Sea Spurge	Tengħud tar-Ramel	
	Euphorbia peplis	Chamaesyce peplis	Purple Spurge	Ġemmugħa tar-ramel	
	Euphorbia peplus	Tithymalus peplus	Petty Spurge	Tengħud tal-ġonna	
	Euphorbia peplus var. minima	Euphorbia peploides	Dwarf Petty Spurge	Tengħud Ċkejken tal-ġonna	
	Euphorbia pulcherrima		Poinsettia	Punsjetta	
	Euphorbia segetalis	Euphorbia pinea	Pine Spurge	Tengħud Komuni	
	Euphorbia terracina		Coastal Spurge	Tengħud tax-Xatt	
	Evax pygmaea	Filago pygmaea	Pygmy Cudweed	Evaks	

== F ==
Image	Species name	Synonym	Common name	Maltese name	Ref
	Fagonia cretica		Fagonia	Fagonja	
	Fallopia aubertii	Bilderdykia aubertii	Silver Lace Vine		
	Fallopia convolvulus	Fallopia baldschuanica	Black bindweed	Leblieba ħadra	
	Fedia graciliflora	Fedia cornucopiae subsp. graciliflora	Lesser Horn-of-plenty	Sieq il-ħamiema	
	Ferula melitensis		Maltese Giant Fennel	Ferla ta' Malta	
	Festuca cinerea		Blue Fescue	Żwien	
	Ficus carica	Ficus carica var. domestica	Fig tree	Tina	
	Ficus elastica	Ficus elastica var. decora	Indian Rubber Tree		
	Ficus macrophylla	Ficus macrophylla subsp. columnaris	Moreton Bay fig	Fikus taz-zokk kbir	
	Ficus microcarpa	Ficus nitida	Chinese Banyan Tree	Fikus tat-toroq	
	Ficus rubiginosa	Ficus leichhardtii	Rusty-leaved fig	Fikus tal-werqa msadda	
	Ficus rubiginosa var. glabrescens	Ficus australis	Hairless Port Jackson fig	Fikus tal-Awstralja	
	Filago cossyrensis	Filago pyramidata var. gussonei	Maltese Cudweed	Kabuccinella ta' Malta	
	Filago pyramidata	Filago vulgaris subsp. pyramidata	Broad-leaved Cudweed		
	Foeniculum vulgare subsp. piperitum	Foeniculum piperitum	Bitter Fennel	Bużbież salvaġġ	
	Foeniculum vulgare subsp. vulgare	Foeniculum dulce	Fennel	Bużbież	
	Frankenia hirsuta	Frankenia laevis var. hirsuta	Hairy Sea Heath	Erba Franka	
	Frankenia laevis		Sea Heath		
	Frankenia pulverulenta		Annual Sea Heath		
	Fraxinus angustifolia	Fraxinus oxycarpa	Narrow-leaved Ash	Fraxxnu	
	Freesia kewensis		Red river Freesia	Friżja tal-ġonna	
	Freesia laxa	Gladiolus laxus	African Lapeyrousia	Friżja irqiqa	
	Freesia leichtlinii	Freesia muirii	Leichtlin's Freesia	Friżja selvaġġa kommuni	
	Freesia leichtlinii subsp. alba	Freesia leichtlinii subsp. alba	White Freesia	Friżja selvaġġa bajda	
	Fumana arabica	Helianthemum arabicum	Mediterranean Rock Rose	Ċistu isfar	
	Fumana laevipes	Cistus laevipes	Narrow-leaved needle sunrose	Ċistu tal-blat	
	Fumana laevis	Fumana laevis subsp. juniperina	Smooth Thyme Rock Rose	Ċistu isfar lixx	
	Fumana thymifolia	Helianthemum thymifolium	Thyme Rock Rose	Ċistu żgħir	
	Fumaria agraria		Field Fumitory		
	Fumaria barnolae	Fumaria bella	Baronola's fumitory		
	Fumaria bastardii	Fumaria affinis	Tall Ramping Fumitory		
	Fumaria bicolor		Two-coloured Fumitory		
	Fumaria capreolata	Fumaria officinalis subsp. capreolata	White Ramping Fumitory		
	Fumaria densiflora	Fumaria micrantha	Dense-flowered Fumitory		
	Fumaria flabellata	Fumaria capreolata subsp. flabellata	Southern Ramping Fumitory		
	Fumaria gaillardotii	Fumaria agraria subsp. major	Italian Fumitory	Daħnet l-art kbira	
	Fumaria muralis	Fumaria capreolata subsp. muralis	Common Ramping FumitoryWall Fumitory	Daħnet l-art	
	Fumaria officinalis	Fumaria viciosoi	Common Fumitory	Daħnet l-art medja	
	Fumaria parviflora		Fine-leaved Fumitory	Daħnet l-art żgħira	
	Fumaria schleicheri		Schleicher's fumitory		
	Fumaria vaillantii	Fumaria caespitosa	Few-flowered Fumitory		

== G ==
Image	Species name	Synonym	Common name	Maltese name	Ref
	Galactites tomentosa	Lupsia galactites	Mediterranean Thistle	Xewk abjad	
	Galium aparine		Cleavers	Ħarxajja komuni	
	Galium murale		Yellow Bedstraw	Ħarxajja safra	
	Galium spurium		False Cleavers	Ħarxajja	
	Galium tricornutum	Galium tricorne	Corn Cleavers	Ħarxajja ta' tlett iqran	
	Galium verrucosum	Galium saccharatum	Southern Cleavers	Ħarxajja tal-felul	
	Gasteria acinacifolia		Gasteria		
	Gastridium phleoides	Lachnagrostis phleoides	Nit Grass		
	Gastridium ventricosum	Gastridium scabrum	Nit Grass	Mustaċċi tal-qattus	
	Geranium dissectum		Cut-leaved Crane's Bill	Ġeranju tal-weraq bil-pizzi	
	Geranium molle		Dove's foot Crane's Bill	Ġeranju tal-weraq artab	
	Geranium purpureum	Geranium robertianum subsp. purpureum	Little Robin	Ġeranju roża	
	Geranium robertianum	Robertiella robertiana	Herb Robert		
	Geranium rotundifolium		Round-Leaved Crane's Bill	Ġeranju tal-werqa tonda	
	Geropogon hybridus	Tragopogon hybridus	Hairless Goatsbeard	Leħjet il-bodbod	
	Gladiolus communis s.l.	Gladiolus gussonei	Eastern gladiolus	Ħabb il-qamħ tal-blat	
	Gladiolus italicus	Gladiolus segetum	Field Gladiolus	Ħabb il-qamħ tar-raba	
	Glaucium flavum	Glaucium luteum	Yellow Horned Poppy	Peprin isfar	
	Glebionis coronaria	Chrysanthemum coronarium	Crown Daisy	Lellux	
	Glebionis segetum	Chrysanthemum segetum	Corn Daisy	Lellux tar-raba	
	Glyceria notata	Glyceria fluitans var. plicata	Plicate Sweet Grass		
	Gossypium herbaceum	Gossypium stocksii	Levant Cotton	Qotton Malti	
	Gossypium hirsutum	Gossypium mexicanum	American Cotton	Qotton ta' Gallipoli	

== H ==
Image	Species name	Synonym	Common name	Maltese name	Ref
	Hainardia cylindrica	Rottboellia cylindrica	Barbgrass	Monerma	
	Halimione portulacoides	Atriplex portulacoides	Sea Purslane		
	Harpullia arborea	Harpullia imbricata	Tulip Wood-Tree		
	Hedera helix	Hedera taurica	Ivy	Liedna	
	Hedypnois cretica	Hedypnois rhagadioloides subsp. cretica	Variable Hyoseris		
	Hedypnois rhagadioloides		Variable Hyoseris		
	Hedysarum coronarium		Sulla	Silla	
	Hedysarum glomeratum	Hedysarum capitatum	Clustered Sulla	Silla selvaġġa	
	Hedysarum spinosissimum	Hedysarum pallens	Spiny Sulla	Silla bix-xewk	
	Helianthus annuus	Helianthus lenticularis	Sunflower	Warda tax-xemx	
	Helianthus tuberosus		Jerusalem Artichoke	Artiċokk	
	Helichrysum panormitanum subsp. melitense	Helichrysum melitense	Maltese Helichrysium	Sempreviva ta' Għawdex	
	Heliotropium curassavicum		Salt Heliotrope		
	Heliotropium europaeum		Common Heliotrope	Vanilja bajda	
	Herniaria cinerea	Herniaria hirsuta subsp. cinerea	Grey Rupture-Wort		
	Herniaria hirsuta		Hairy Rupture-Wort		
	Hibiscus rosa-sinensis		Rose of China	Babiskuwa	
	Himantoglossum robertianum	Barlia robertiana	Giant Orchid	Orkida kbira	
	Hippocrepis biflora	Hippocrepis unisiliquosa subsp. biflora	Two-flowered Horseshoe Vetch	Xintilli żgħira	
	Hippocrepis ciliata	Hippocrepis dicarpa	Lesser Horseshoe Vetch	Xintilli	
	Hippocrepis emerus	Coronilla emerus	Pale Crown Vetch		
	Hippocrepis multisiliquosa	Hippocrepis ambigua	Many-flowered Horseshoe Vetch	Xintilli komuni	
	Hirschfeldia incana	Brassica adpressa	Hoary Mustard	Mustarda selvaġġa	
	Hordeum bulbosum	Critesion bulbosum	Bulbous Barley		
	Hordeum geniculatum	Hordeum gussoneanum	Mediterranean Barley	Bunixxief tal-Mediterran	
	Hordeum marinum	Hordeum maritimum	Sea Barley	Bunexxief tal-baħar	
	Hordeum murinum subsp. leporinum	Hordeum leporinum	Mouse Barley	Bunexxief komuni	
	Hordeum murinum subsp. murinum	Hordeum rubens	Wall Barley	Bunexxief tat-tafal	
	Hordeum vulgare subsp. distichon	Hordeum distichon	Two-rowed Barley	Xgħir tal-birra	
	Hordeum vulgare subsp. vulgare	Hordeum hexastichum	Barley	Xgħir	
	Hyacinthus orientalis		Garden Hyacinth	Ġjacint	
	Hylocereus undatus	Cereus undatus	Red Pitaya		
	Hymenocarpos circinnatus	Circinnus circinnatus	Spiny Kidney Vetch	Nefel ta' Għawdex	
	Hymenolobus revelierei subsp. sommieri	Hutchinsia procumbens forma sommieri	Maltese Hymenolobus	Ġargir ta' Kemmuna	
	Hyoscyamus albus		White Henbane	Mammażejża	
	Hyoscyamus niger		Henbane		
	Hyoseris frutescens			Żigland ta' Għawdex	
	Hyoseris radiata		Perennial Hyoseris	Żigland tal-pizzi	
	Hyoseris scabra		Annual Hyoseris	Żigland	
	Hyparrhenia hirta	Andropogon hirtus	Beard Grass	Barrum tax-xagħri	
	Hypecoum imberbe	Hypecoum grandiflorum	Beardless Hypecoum		
	Hypecoum procumbens		Sickle-fruited Hypecoum		
	Hypericum aegypticum	Triadenia aegyptica	Shrubby St. John's Wort	Fexfiex tal-irdum	
	Hypericum australe	Hypericum humifusum subsp. australe	Southern St John's-wort		
	Hypericum pubescens	Hypericum tomentosum	Pubescent St. John's Wort	Fexfiex Sufi	
	Hypericum triquetrifolium	Hypericum crispum	Wavy-leaved Saint John's Wort	Fexfiex tar-Raba	
	Hypochaeris achyrophorus	Hedypnois aetnensis	Mediterranean Catsear	Żigland żgħir	

== I ==
Image	Species name	Synonym	Common name	Maltese name	Ref
	Ipomoea alba	Ipomoea bona-nox	Moonflower vine	Kampanella bajda	
	Ipomoea batatas	Convolvulus batatas	Sweet potato vine	Patata Ħelwa	
	Ipomoea cairica	Ipomoea palmata	Cairo morning glory	Kampanella tal-Eġittu	
	Ipomoea indica	Ipomoea cathartica	Blue morning Glory	Kampanella tal-Indja	
	Ipomoea purpurea	Ipomoea diversifolia	Purple morning glory	Kampanella komuni	
	Ipomoea tricolor	Ipomoea rubrocaerulea	Morning glory	Kampanella kaħla	
	Iris albicans	Iris madonna	Cemetery Iris	Fjurduliż abjad	
	Iris foetidissima	Xiphion foetidissimum	Stinking Iris	Fjurduliż tal-Bosk	
	Iris germanica	Iris spectabilis	German bearded Iris	Fjurduliż ikħal	
	Iris pseudacorus	Iris lutea	Yellow Iris	Fjurduliż tal-ilma	
	Iris pseudopumila		Southern Dwarf Iris	Bellus	
	Iris sicula		Sicilian Iris	Fjurduliż Sqalli	
	Iris tectorum	Tectiris tectorum	Japanese roof Iris		
	Iris xiphium	Xiphion vulgare	Spanish Iris	Fjurduliż tal-ġonna	
	Isoetes histrix var. subinermis	Cephaloceraton histrix	Sand Quillwort	Isoetes	

== J ==
Image	Species name	Synonym	Common name	Maltese name	Ref
	Jacaranda mimosifolia	Jacaranda acutifolia	Blue Jacaranda		
	Jacobaea maritima subsp. sicula	Senecio bicolor	Sicilian Silver Ragwort	Kromb il-baħar isfar	
	Jasminum azoricum	Jasminum trifoliatum	Azores Jasmine		
	Juglans regia	Juglans fallax	Walnut	Ġewża	
	Juncellus distachyos	Cyperus laevigatus subsp. distachyos	Mediterranean Galingale		
	Juncus acutus		Sharp-Pointed Rush	Simar Lixx	
	Juncus articulatus		Jointed Rush	Simar	
	Juncus bufonius		Toad Rush	Simar żgħir	
	Juncus capitatus		Dwarf Rush		
	Juncus effusus		Soft Rush		
	Juncus hybridus	Juncus bufonius subsp. hybridus	Hybrid Toad Rush	Simar żgħir	
	Juncus maritimus		Sea Rush	Simar tal-baħar	
	Juncus sorrentinii	Juncus bufonius subsp. sorrentinii	Sorrentini's Rush		
	Juncus subulatus	Juncus multiflorus	Somerset Rush	Simar tal-ilma	
	Juniperus phoenicea		Phoenician Juniper	Ġnibru	
	Justicia adhatoda	Adhatoda vasica	Malabar Nut	Ġustizja	

== K ==
Image	Species name	Synonym	Common name	Maltese name	Ref
	Kalanchoe daigremontiana	Bryophyllum daigremontianum	Mother of millions		
	Kalanchoe delagoensis	Bryophyllum tubiflorum	Devil's backbone		
	Kickxia commutata	Linaria commutata	Mediterranean fluellen	Xatbet l-art vjola	
	Kickxia elatine	Linaria elatine	Sharp-leaved fluellen	Xatbet l-art skars	
	Kickxia spuria	Linaria spuria	Round-leaved fluellen	Xetbet l-art safra	
	Krubera peregrina	Capnophyllum peregrinum		Krubera	
	Kundmannia sicula	Sium siculum	Kundmannia	Kudmannja ta' Sqallija	

== L ==
Image	Species name	Synonym	Common name	Maltese name	Ref
	Lactuca saligna	Lactuca virgata	Least Lettuce		
	Lactuca sativa	Lactuca capitata	Lettuce	Ħass	
	Lactuca serriola	Lactuca scariola	Prickly Lettuce	Ħass Salvaġġ tal-Pizzi	
	Lagunaria patersonia	Hibiscus patersonii	Primrose Tree	Lagunarja	
	Lagurus ovatus		Hare's Tail Grass	Denb il-fenek	
	Lamarckia aurea	Cynosurus aureus	Golden Grass	Xkupilja	
	Lamium amplexicaule		Henbit Dead Nettle	Kapilliera	
	Lampranthus aureus	Mesembryanthemum aureum	Golden Vygie		
	Lampranthus multiradiatus	Mesembryanthemum multiradiatum	Creeping Ice Plant		
	Lampranthus spectabilis	Mesembryanthemum spectabile	Trailing Ice Plant		
	Lantana camara	Lantana armata	Lantana	Lantana	
	Lantana montevidensis		Trailing Lantana	Lantana xeblieka	
	Lathyrus annuus	Lathyrus chius	Annual Pea		
	Lathyrus aphaca	Lathyrus affinis	Yellow Vetchling	Porvlina	
	Lathyrus cicera		Chickling Vetch	Ġilbiena tas-Serp	
	Lathyrus clymenum	Lathyrus articulatus var. clymenum	Crimson Pea	Ġilbiena tas-serp	
	Lathyrus gorgoni	Lathyrus amoenus	R Pea		
	Lathyrus inconspicuus	Lathyrus erectus	Inconspicuous Pea		
	Lathyrus ochrus		Pale Pea	Ġilbiena bajda	
	Lathyrus odoratus	Lathyrus cyprius	Sweet pea		
	Lathyrus setifolius		Red Pea		
	Lathyrus sphaericus	Lathyrus coccineus	Round Pea		
	Launaea resedifolia	Zollikoferia resedifolia	Divided-leaved Sow Thistle		
	Laurus nobilis		Bay Laurel	Siġra tar-rand	
	Lavandula angustifolia	Lavandula officinalis	Common Lavender		
	Lavandula dentata		French Lavender		
	Lavandula multifida		Fern-leaved Lavender		
	Lavatera arborea	Lavatera dendromorpha	Tree Mallow	Ħobbejża tas-siġra	
	Lavatera cretica	Lavatera cavanillesii	Cornish Mallow	Ħobbejża wieqfa	
	Lavatera trimestris	Stegia trimestris	Rose Mallow	Ħobbejża tal-warda kbira	
	Legousia hybrida var. foliosa	Specularia hybrida	Venus looking Glass		
	Lemna minor		Common Duckweed	Lemna komuni	
	Lemna minuta	Lemna valdiviana	Least Duckweed	Lemna iż-żgħira	
	Leontodon tuberosus		Tuberous Hawkbit	Żigland tal-għerq	
	Lepidium graminifolium		Grass-leaved Pepperwort	Buttuniera wieqfa	
	Lepidium sativum	Nasturtium crispum	Garden Cress		
	Leucaena leucocephala	Leucaena glauca	Lead Tree	Gażżija Bajda	
	Leucanthemum vulgare	Chrysanthemum leucanthemum	Oxe-eye Daisy		
	Limbarda crithmoides	Inula crithmoides	Golden Samphire	Xorbett	
	Limonium melitense		Maltese Sea Lavender	Limonju ta' Malta	
	Limonium serotinum	Limonium vulgare subsp. serotinum	Narbonne's Sea Lavender		
	Limonium sinuatum	Statice sinuata	English Statice	Limonju	
	Limonium virgatum	Limonium oleifolium	Violet Sea Lavender	Limonju tal-baħar	
	Limonium zeraphae		Zerapha's Sea Lavender	Limonju ta' Żerafa	
	Linaria chalepensis	Antirrhinum chalepensis	Mediterranean Toadflax		
	Linaria pseudolaxiflora		Maltese Toadflax	Papoċċi ta' Malta	
	Linaria triphylla		Three-coloured Toadflax	Papoċċi tat-tlett werqiet	
	Linum bienne	Linum angustifolium	Pale Flax	Kittien ikħal	
	Linum decumbens		Ascending Flax	Kittien aħmar	
	Linum grandiflorum	Linum rubrum	Scarlet Flax		
	Linum strictum		Upright Flax	Kittien tal-imħarbat	
	Linum trigynum	Linum gallicum	Southern Flax	Kittien isfar	
	Linum usitatissimum		Common Flax	Kittien	
	Lippia nodiflora	Lippia repens	Lippia		
	Lithospermum arvense	Buglossoides arvensis	Field Gromwell		
	Lobularia maritima		Sweet Alyssum	Buttuniera	
	Lolium multiflorum	Lolium aristatum	Italian Rye Grass	Sikrana tal-Italja	
	Lolium perenne	Festuca perennis	Perennial Rye Grass	Sikrana	
	Lolium rigidum	Lolium strictum	Stiff Rye Grass	Sikrana iebsa	
	Lolium temulentum	Festuca temulenta	Darnel Grass	Sikrana	
	Lonicera implexa		Evergreen Honeysuckle	Qarn il-mogħża	
	Lonicera japonica	Lonicera chinensis	Japanese Honeysuckle		
	Lotus cytisoides	Lotus creticus subsp. cytisoides	Grey Birdsfoot Trefoil	Għantux tal-blat	
	Lotus edulis		Edible Birdsfoot Trefoil	Qrempuċ	
	Lotus halophilus	Lotus pusillus	Sand Restharrow	Għantux tar-Ramel	
	Lotus ornithopodioides		Clustered Birdsfoot Trefoil	Għantux sieq l-għasfur	
	Lotus preslii	Lotus corniculatus subsp. preslii	Presli's bird's-foot trefoil	Għantux	
	Lycium chinense	Lycium ovatum	Chinese Tea Tree	Għawseġ taċ-Ċina	
	Lycium europaeum		Mediterranean Tea Tree	Għawseġ tal-Mediterran	
	Lycium ferrocissimum	Lycium macrocalyx	African Tea Tree	Għawseġ tal-Afrika	
	Lycium intricatum	Lycium europaeum var. intricatum	Southern Tea Tree	Għawseġ	
	Lycopersicon esculentum	Solanum lycopersicon	Tomato	Tadama	
	Lygeum spartum		Esparto Grass	Ħalfa	
	Lythrum hyssopifolia		Grass-Poly	Litrum tal-għadajjar	
	Lythrum junceum	Lythrum graefferi	Creeping Loosestrife	Litrum tal-ilma	

== M ==
Image	Species name	Synonym	Common name	Maltese name	Ref
	Macfadyena unguis-cati	Doxantha unguis-cati	Cat-claw ivy		
	Maclura pomifera	Toxylon pomiferum	Osage Orange		
	Mahonia aquifolium	Berbis aquifolium	Oregon Grape		
	Malephora crocea	Mesembryanthemum croceum	Red Ice Plant		
	Malephora lutea	Mesembryanthemum luteum	Rocky Point Ice Plant		
	Malephora purpureo-crocea	Crocanthus purpureocroceus	Tequila Sunrise Ice Plant		
	Malope malacoides subsp. malacoides		Hairy Mallow		
	Malope trifida		Annual Malope		
	Malus domestica	Malus sylvestris subsp. mitis	Cultivated Apple	Tuffieħ selvaġġ	
	Malus sylvestris	Malus communis subsp. sylvestris	Crab Apple	Tuffieħ	
	Malva cretica		Mediterranean Mallow	Ħobbejża tat-toroq	
	Malva nicaeensis	Malva montana	Southern Mallow	Ħobbejża mitfija	
	Malva parviflora	Malva microcarpa	Least Mallow	Ħobbejża tal-warda żgħira	
	Malva sylvestris	Malva hirsuta	Common Mallow	Ħobbejża tar-raba	
	Marrubium vulgare		White Horehound	Marrubja bajda	
	Matricaria aurea	Chamomilla aurea	Golden Mayweed	Kamumilla nana	
	Matricaria chamomilla	Matricaria recutita	Scented Mayweed	Kamumilla	
	Matthiola incana subsp. incana	Matthiola glabra	Hoary Stocks	Giżi	
	Matthiola incana subsp. melitensis		Maltese Stocks	Giżi ta' Malta	
	Matthiola longipetala	Cheiranthus longipetalus	Night-scented Stock	Giżi ta' lejl	
	Matthiola lunata	Matthiola anoplia	Spanish stocks	Giżi ta' Spanja	
	Matthiola tricuspidata		Three-horned Stocks	Ġiżi tal-baħar	
	Medicago arabica	Medicago maculata	Spotted Medick	Nefel	
	Medicago arborea		Tree Medick	Siġret in-nefel	
	Medicago ciliaris	Medicago intertexta subsp. ciliata	Ciliate Medick	Nefel	
	Medicago doliata	Medicago aculeata	Straight-spined Medick	Nefel	
	Medicago intertexta		Prickly Medick	Nefel	
	Medicago italica	Medicago tornata	Hairy Medick	Nefel	
	Medicago littoralis	Medicago arenaria	Coastal Medick	Nefel tax-xtut	
	Medicago lupulina	Medicago appenina	Black Medick	Nefel iswed	
	Medicago lupulina var. cupaniana	Medicago cupaniana	Cupani Black Medick	Nefel iswed	
	Medicago marina		Sea Medick	Nefel tar-ramel	
	Medicago minima		Burr Medick	Nefel żgħir	
	Medicago monspeliaca	Trigonella monspeliaca	Hairy Trigonella	Nefel	
	Medicago murex	Medicago sicula	Spiny Medick	Nefel	
	Medicago orbicularis	Medicago marginata	Round-fruited Medick	Nefel	
	Medicago polymorpha	Medicago apiculata	Toothed Medick	Nefel komuni	
	Medicago polymorpha var. brevispina	Medicago denticulata var. brevispina	Short-Toothed Medick	Nefel komuni	
	Medicago rigidula	Medicago agrestis	Field Medick	Nefel	
	Medicago rugosa	Medicago elegans	Rugose Medick	Nefel	
	Medicago sativa		Alfalfa	Nefel	
	Medicago truncatula	Medicago tentaculata	Mediterranean Medick	Nefel	
	Medicago tuberculata	Medicago turbinata	Southern Medick	Nefel	
	Melia azedarach	Melia japonica	Indian Lilac	Siġra tat-tosku	
	Melica ciliata		Ciliate Melick	Melika sufija	
	Melica minuta	Melica arrecta	Small Melick	Melika kommuni	
	Melilotus elegans		Elegant Melilot		
	Melilotus indicus	Melilotus parviflorus	Small Melilot	Trew tat-toroq	
	Melilotus infestus	Melilotus rigidus	Round-fruited Melilot	Trew	
	Melilotus italicus		Italian Melilot		
	Melilotus messanensis	Melilotus siculus	Southern Melilot	Trew	
	Melilotus segetalis	Melilotus sulcatus subsp. segetalis	Corn Melilot	Trew	
	Melilotus sulcatus	Melilotus compactus	Mediterranean Melilot	Trew komuni	
	Melissa officinalis		Lemon balm	Nagħniegħ in-naħal	
	Mentha aquatica		Water Mint	Nagħniegħ selvaġġ	
	Mentha piperita	Mentha balsamea	Peppermint	Nagħniegħ tas-seba' rwejjaħ	
	Mentha pulegium		Peppermint	Plejju	
	Mentha spicata	Mentha viridis	Spear Mint	Nagħniegħ	
	Mentha suaveolens	Mentha rotundifolia	Round-leaved Mint	Nagħniegħ Selvaġġ	
	Mercurialis ambigua	Merculialis annua var. ambigua	Bisexual annual mercury		
	Mercurialis annua		Annual Mercury	Burikba	
	Mesembryanthemum cordifolium	Aptenia cordifolia	Heart-leaved Ice Plant	Widnet il-Ħanżir	
	Mesembryanthemum crystallinum	Cryophytum crystallinum	Crystal Ice Plant	Kristallina tar-ramel	
	Mesembryanthemum lancifolium	Aptenia lancifolia	Lance-leaved Ice Plant	Qrun il-Baqra	
	Mesembryanthemum nodiflorum	Cryophytum nodiflorum	Lesser Crystal Ice Plant	Kristallina tal-blat	
	Mespilus germanica	Mespilus sylvestris	Medlar	Fomm il-lipp	
	Micromeria graeca	Satureja graeca	Greek Savory	Sagħtrija Griega	
	Micromeria microphylla	Satureja microphylla	Maltese savory	Xpakkapietra	
	Milium effusum		Wood Millet		
	Minuartia mediterranea		Mediterranean Sandwort		
	Mirabilis jalapa	Mirabilis odorata	Four o'clock Flower	Ħummejr	
	Misopates calycinum		Pale Lesser Snapdragon	Papoċċi skars	
	Misopates orontium	Antirrhinum orontium	Lesser Snapdragon	Papoċċi rqiq	
	Moraea sisyrinchium	Gynandriris sisyrinchium	Barbary Nut Iris	Fjurduliż salvaġġ	
	Morus alba		White Mulberry	Ċawsla	
	Morus nigra		Black Mulberry	Tuta	
	Musa x paradisiaca	Musa sapientum	Banana	Banana	
	Muscari commutatum		Dark Grape Hyacinth	Muskari skuri	
	Muscari comosum	Leopoldia comosa	Tassel Grape Hyacinth	Basal il-ħnieżer	
	Muscari neglectum	Muscari compactum	Southern Grape Hyacinth		
	Muscari parviflorum		Autumn Grape Hyacinth	Ġjaċint tal-Ħarifa	
	Myoporum insulare	Myoporum serratum	Blueberry tree	Mijoporum	
	Myoporum laetum	Myoporum tenuifolium	Mousehole Tree	Mijoporum tal-werqa wiesgħa	
	Myosotis ramosissima	Myosotis collina	Early Forget-me-not	Widnet il-ġurdien	
	Myriophyllum verticillatum		Whorl-leaf Water-milfoil		
	Myrtus communis		Common Myrtle	Riħan	

== N ==
Image	Species name	Synonym	Common name	Maltese name	Ref
	Narcissus elegans	Hermione elegans	Elegant Narcissus	Narċis imwaħħar skars	
	Narcissus papyraceus		White Narcissus	Narċis abjad	
	Narcissus serotinus		Late Narcissus	Narċis imwaħħar	
	Narcissus tazetta subsp. italicus	Hermione chlorotica	Garden Narcissus	Narċis pallidu	
	Narcissus tazetta subsp. tazetta	Hermione tazetta	French Daffodil	Narċis	
	Nasturtium officinale	Nasturtium aquatica	Watercress	Krexxuni	
	Nauplius aquaticus	Asteriscus aquaticus	Golden Star	Għajn il-baqra tax-xatt	
	Neatostema apulum	Lithospermum apulum	Yellow Gromwell		
	Neotinea lactea	Orchis lactea	Milky Orchid	Orkida bajda tat-tikek	
	Neotinea maculata	Orchis intacta	Dense-flowered Orchid	Orkida rqiqa	
	Nerium oleander	Oleander vulgaris	Oleander	Difla	
	Neslia paniculata subsp. thracica	Neslia apiculata	Ball mustard		
	Nicotiana glauca		Glaucous Tobacco	Tabakk tas-swar	
	Nigella damascena	Nigella arvensis subsp. minor	Love-in-a-mist	Sieq il-brimba	
	Nopalea dejecta	Opuntia dejecta	Salm-Dyk		
	Nothoscordum borbonicum	Nothoscordum inodorum	Fragrant False Garlic	Tewm tal-qsari	
	Notobasis syriaca	Cirsium syriacum	Horse Thistle	Xewk tax-xitan	
	Nymphaea alba		European White Waterlily		

== O ==
Image	Species name	Synonym	Common name	Maltese name	Ref
	Ocimum basilicum		Basil	Ħabaq	
	Oenanthe globulosa	Globocarpus oenanthoides	Round-headed Water Dropwort	Karfus tal-wied	
	Olea europaea subsp. europaea		Olive	Żebbuġa	
	Olea europaea subsp. oleaster	Olea europaea subsp. europaea var. sylvestris	Wild Olive	Żebbuġa selvaġġa	
	Ononis alopecuroides	Ononis baetica	Foxtail Restharrow		
	Ononis biflora	Ononis geminiflora	Two-flowered Restharrow	Broxka ta' żewġ fjuri	
	Ononis mitissima		Mediterranean Restharrow	Broxka tat-tafal	
	Ononis natrix subsp. ramosissima	Ononis foliosa	Bush Restharrow	Broxka ta' Għawdex	
	Ononis oligophylla		Few-leaved Restharrow	Trew tat-tafal	
	Ononis ornithopodioides		Bird Restharrow		
	Ononis reclinata	Ononis inclusa	Small Restharrow	Broxka	
	Ononis sieberi	Ononis viscosa subsp. sieberi	Sieber's restharrow		
	Ononis variegata	Ononis euphrasiifolia	Villous Restharrow		
	Ononis viscosa subsp. viscosa		Sticky Restharrow		
	Onopordum argolicum	Onopordum sibthorpianum	Argolian Cotton Thistle	Xewk ta' Għawdex	
	Ophrys apifera	Ophrys arachnites	Bee Orchid	Naħla	
	Ophrys bertolonii	Ophrys romolini	Bertoloni's Bee Orchid	Dubbiena ta' Bertoloni	
	Ophrys bombyliflora	Ophrys tabanifera	Bumble-Bee Orchid	Brimba griża	
	Ophrys bombyliflora var. parviflora		Small-flowered Bumble-Bee Orchid	Brimba griża żgħira	
	Ophrys caesiella	Ophrys gazella	Maltese Brown Orchid	Dubbiena bikrija ta' Malta	
	Ophrys × campolati	Ophrys × gaulosana	Gozitan Bee orchid	Dubbiena ta' Għawdex	
	Ophrys × dessartiana	Ophrys × tumentia	Breasted Bee orchid	Dubbiena ta' sidirha kbir	
	Ophrys incubacea	Ophrys sphegodes subsp. atrata	Spider orchid	Brimba tal-ġwienaħ	
	Ophrys iricolor subsp. lojaconoi	Ophrys lojaconoi	Lojaconoi's Rainbow Bee Orchid	Dubbiena ta' Lojakono	
	Ophrys iricolor subsp. mesaritica	Ophrys iricolor subsp. hospitalis	Cretan Rainbow Bee Orchid	Dubbiena ta' Kreta	
	Ophrys iricolor subsp. vallesiana	Ophrys vallesiana	Valles' Rainbow Bee Orchid	Dubbiena ta' Tuneż	
	Ophrys lacaitae	Ophrys fuciflora subsp. lacaitae	Yellow Spider Orchid	Brimba safra	
	Ophrys lunulata	Ophrys aranifera subsp. lunulata	Moon Spider Orchid	Brimba tal-qamar	
	Ophrys lupercalis	Ophrys fusca subsp. luperclaes	Lupercales Bee Orchid	Dubbiena tax-xitwa	
	Ophrys lutea subsp. lutea	Ophrys insectifera var. lutea	Yellow bee orchid	Żunżana safra l-kbira	
	Ophrys lutea subsp. phryganae	Ophrys phyrganae	Phyrgana Yellow Bee Orchid	Żunżana safra tal-frigana	
	Ophrys lutea subsp. sicula	Ophrys lutea subsp. galilaea	Sicilian Yellow Bee Orchid	Żunżana safra ż-żgħira	
	Ophrys melitensis	Ophrys sphegodes subsp. melitensis	Maltese Spider Orchid	Brimba s-sewda	
	Ophrys oxyrrhynchos subsp. calliantha	Ophrys calliantha	Elegant Spider Orchid	Brimba tal-fjuri sbieħ	
	Ophrys oxyrrhynchos subsp. oxyrrhynchos	Ophrys fuciflora subsp. oxyrrhynchos	Beaked Spider Orchid	Brimba ta' Sqallija	
	Ophrys passionis	Ophrys sphegodes subsp. passionis	Passion-of-Christ Spider Orchid	Brimba tal-Passjoni ta' Kristu	
	Ophrys speculum	Ophrys ciliata	Mirror Orchid	Dubbiena kaħla	
	Ophrys tenthredinifera subsp. grandiflora	Ophrys grandiflora	Large-flowered Sawfly Orchid	Naħla kbira	
	Ophrys tenthredinifera subsp. tenthredinifera	Ophrys tenoreana	Sawfly bee orchid	Naħla kbira bikrija	
	Opuntia dillenii	Cactus indicus	Erect Prickly Pear		
	Opuntia ficus-indica	Opuntia ficus-barbarica	Prickly Pear	Bajtar tax-xewk	
	Opuntia microdasys	Opuntia macrocalyx	Bunny Ears Cactus		
	Opuntia pilifera		Cocoche Loco		
	Opuntia vulgaris		Prickly Pear Cactus		
	Orchis italica	Orchis undulatifolia	Naked Man Orchid	Ħajja u mejta tal-werqa Fdewxa	
	Origanum dictamnus	Dictamnus creticus	Dittany	Riegnu ta' Ġnien il-Kbir	
	Origanum majorana		Marjoram	Merqtux	
	Origanum onites	Majorana onites	White Marjoram	Riegnu abjad	
	Origanum vulgare		Oregano	Riegnu selvaġġ	
	Ornithogalum arabicum		Large Star of Bethlehem	Ħalib it-tajr kbir	
	Ornithogalum divergens		Lesser Star of Bethlehem	Ħalib it-tajr skars	
	Ornithogalum narbonense		Southern Star of Bethlehem	Ħalib it-tajr żgħir	
	Orobanche canescens		Yellow Broomrape		
	Orobanche caryophyllacea		Bedstraw Broomrape		
	Orobanche cernua		Drooping Broomrape		
	Orobanche clausonis		Glandular Broomrape	Budebbus vjola u abjad	
	Orobanche crenata		Bean Broomrape	Budebbus tal-ful	
	Orobanche hederae		Ivy Broomrape		
	Orobanche lavandulacea	Kopsia lavandulacea	Lavender Broomrape	Budebbus vjola	
	Orobanche minor	Orobanche barbata	Common Broomrape		
	Orobanche picridis	Orobanche loricata	Ox-tongue Broomrape	Budebbus isfar	
	Orobanche pubescens	Orobanche versicolor	Hairy Broomrape	Budebbus muswaf	
	Orobanche sanguinea	Orobanche crinita	Bloody Broomrape	Budebbus demmi	
	Osteospermum jucundum	Dimorphotheca jucundum	African Daisy		
	Otanthus maritimus	Diotis candidissima	Cottonweed	Santolina tar-ramel	
	Oxalis corniculata	Creeping Wood Sorrel	Ingliża żgħira		
	Oxalis debilis		Pink Wood Sorrel		
	Oxalis fontana	Oxalis eurpaea	Yellow Wood Sorrel	Ingliża Wieqfa	
	Oxalis pes-caprae		Bermuda Buttercup	Ħaxixa Ingliża	
	Oxybasis urbica	Chenopodium urbicum	Upright Goosefoot	Għobbejra	

== P ==
Image	Species name	Synonym	Common name	Maltese name	Ref
	Paliurus spina-christi	Rhamnus paliurus	Christ's Thorn Tree	Xewk tal-Kuruna ta' Kristu	
	Pallenis spinosa	Asteriscus spinosus	Spiny Golden Star	Għajn il-baqra xewwikija	
	Pancratium foetidum	Pancratium collinum	Stinking Sea Daffodil	Pankrazju tal-Ħarifa	
	Pancratium maritimum	Hymenocallis maritima	Sea Daffodil	Pankrazju selvaġġ	
	Panicum miliaceum		Millet Plant	Panikum skars	
	Panicum repens		Torpedo Grass	Panikum tal-ilma	
	Papaver dubium	Papaver rhoeas subsp. dubium	Long-headed Poppy	peprin tal-frotta twila	
	Papaver hybridum		Rough poppy	Peprin tal-Lanzit	
	Papaver pinnatifidum	Papaver rhoeas subsp. pinnatifidum	Mediterranean Poppy	peprin tal-istammi sofor	
	Papaver rhoeas		Red Poppy	Peprina ħamra	
	Papaver somniferum subsp. setigerum		Opium Poppy	Xaħxieħ Vjola	
	Parapholis filiformis	Rottboellia filiformis	Hard-Grass	Lixxa	
	Parapholis incurva	Aegilops incurva	Curved hard-grass	Nokkli	
	Parapholis marginata		Marginated Hard-Grass	Lixxa skarsa	
	Paraserianthes lophantha	Albizia lophantha	Cape Leeuwin Wattle		
	Parentucellia viscosa	Bellardia viscosa	Yellow Bartsia	Perlina safra	
	Parietaria cretica		Cretan Pellitory-of-the-wall		
	Parietaria judaica	Parietaria diffusa	Pellitory-of-the-wall	Xeħt ir-riħ komuni	
	Parietaria lusitanica		Mediterranean Pellitory-of-the-wall	Xeħt ir-riħ komuni tad-dell	
	Paronychia argentea		Silvery Paronychia		
	Paronychia macrosepala	Paronychia capitata subsp. macrosepala	Mediterranean nailwort		
	Paspalum dilatatum	Digitaria dilatata	Golden Crown Grass	Paspalum wiesgħa	
	Paspalum distichum	Paspalum digitaria	Water Couch Grass	Paspalum	
	Passiflora caerulea		Passion Flower	Fjura tal-passjoni	
	Passiflora perfoliata		Leafy Passion Flower	Fjura tal-passjoni taj-Ġamajka	
	Passiflora × violacea		Violet Passion flower	Fjura tal-passjoni (vjola)	
	Pelargonium hortorum	Pelargonium x hybridum	Garden Geranium	Sardinell	
	Pennisetum setaceum	Cenchrus setaceus	African Feather Grass	Penniżetum	
	Pennisetum villosum	Cenchrus longisetus	Feathertop Fountain Grass	Rixa qasira	
	Periploca angustifolia	Periploca laevigata	African Wolfbane	Siġret il-Ħarir	
	Persicaria lanigera	Polygonum lapathifolium subsp. lanigera	African Persicaria	Persikarja roża	
	Persicaria lapathifolia	Polygonum lapathifolium	Pale Persicaria		
	Persicaria salicifolia	Polygonum serrulatum	Willow-leaved Knotgrass	Persikarja tal-Baħrija	
	Persicaria senegalensis	Polygonum senegalensis	Senegalese Knotgrass		
	Petroselinum crispum	Petroselinum sativum	Parsley	Tursin	
	Phagnalon rupestre subsp. graecum	Phagnalon graecum	Eastern Phagnalon	Lixka komuni	
	Phagnalon rupestre subsp. rupestre	Phagnalon spathulatum	Rock Phagnalon	Lixka tal-blat	
	Phalaris aquatica	Phalaris nodosa	Tuberous Canary Grass	Skalora tal-widien	
	Phalaris brachystachys	Phalaris canariensis subsp. brachystachys	Shortspike Canary Grass	Skalora selvaġġa skarsa	
	Phalaris canariensis		Canary Grass	Skalora	
	Phalaris coerulescens		Purple Canary Grass	Skalora tal-ilma	
	Phalaris minor	Phalaris mauritii	Lesser Canary Grass	Skalora selvaġġa	
	Phalaris paradoxa	Phalaris praemorsa	Mediterranean Canary Grass	Skalora tat-tafal	
	Phalaris truncata		Truncate Canary Grass	Skalora kbira	
	Phaseolus vulgaris		Common Bean	Fażola	
	Phelipanche mutelii	Orobanche mutelii	Dwarf Broomrape	Budebbus tal-Ingliża qasir	
	Phelipanche nana subsp. melitensis	Orobanche nana subsp. melitensis	Maltese Dwarf Sorrel Broomrape	Budebbus tal-Ingliża abjad	
	Phelipanche nana subsp. nana	Orobanche nana	Dwarf Sorrel Broomrape	Budebbus tal-Ingliża vjola	
	Phillyrea latifolia		Mock Privet	Olivastru tal-werqa wiesgħa	
	Phillyrea media	Phillyrea latifolia subsp. media	Mock Privet	Olivastru	
	Phlomis fruticosa		Great Sage	Salvja tal-Madonna	
	Phoenix canariensis		Canary Islands Date Palm	Palma tal-Kannizzati	
	Phoenix dactylifera		Date Palm	Palma tat-Tamar	
	Phragmites australis	Arundo australis	Lesser Reed	Qasbet ir-riħ	
	Phymosia umbellata	Sphaeralcea umbellata	Mexican Bush Mallow		
	Physalis peruviana	Physalis pubescens var. peruviana	Peruvian Cape Gooseberry	Tuffieħ tal-fanal	
	Phytolacca americana	Phytolacca decandra	American Pokeweed	Russett	
	Phytolacca dioica	Phytolacca arborea	Ombu		
	Picris echioides	Helminthotheca echioides	Bristly Oxtongue	Ilsien il-baqra xewwikija	
	Picris hieracioides subsp. spinulosa	Picris kelleriana	Hawkweed Oxtongue		
	Pimpinella anisum	Anisum officinale	Anise	Anisi	
	Pimpinella peregrina	Anisum italicum	Southern Burnet Saxifrage	Sensiela	
	Pinus brutia		Calabrian pine	Żnuber tal-Lvant	
	Pinus canariensis		Canary Islands Pine	Żnuber tal-gżejjer Kanarji	
	Pinus halepensis		Aleppo Pine	Żnuber	
	Pinus pinaster		Maritime pine	Żnuber tal-kosta	
	Pinus pinea		Stone pine	Żnuber tal-ikel	
	Piptatherum coerulescens	Oryzopsis coerulescens	Blue Rice Grass	Barrum kaħlani	
	Piptatherum miliaceum subsp. miliaceum	Oryzopsis miliacea	Rice Grass	Barrum komuni	
	Piptatherum miliaceum subsp. thomasii	Oryzopsis thomasii	Many-branched Rice Grass	Barrum komuni kbir	
	Pistacia atlantica	Pistacia mutica	Mount Atlas Pistachio	Deru tal-Atlantiku	
	Pistacia lentiscus	Lentiscus vulgaris	Lentisk	Deru	
	Pistacia saportae	P. lentiscus x terebinthus	Hybrid Mastic Tree	Deru bagħal	
	Pistacia terebinthus subsp. terebinthus	Lentiscus terebinthus	Terebinth Tree	Skornabekk	
	Pistacia vera	Pistacia narbonnensis	Pistachio Tree	Siġra tal-Pistacja	
	Pittosporum tobira		Japanese Mock Orange	Pittosporum	
	Plantago afra	Plantago psyllium	Glandular Plantain	Żerrigħet il-briegħed	
	Plantago albicans		Downy Plantain		
	Plantago altissima		Narrow-leaved Plantain		
	Plantago bellardi		Hairy Plantain		
	Plantago coronopus		Buck's horn Plantain	Biżbula tal-baħar	
	Plantago crypsoides		North-african plantain		
	Plantago lagopus		Mediterranean Plantain	Biżbula komuni	
	Plantago lanceolata		Ribwort Plantain	Biżbula selvaġġa	
	Plantago macrorrhiza subsp. humilis	Plantago coronopus subsp. macrorrhiza	Perennial Buck's horn Plantain	Biżbula tax-xatt	
	Plantago major subsp. major		Greater Plantain	Biżbula kbira	
	Plantago serraria		Toothed Plantain	Biżbula tas-snien	
	Plantago weldenii	Plantago coronopus subsp. weldenii	Welden's Plantain	Salib l-art	
	Platanus × hispanica	Platanus × acerifolia, Platanus × hybrida	London plane	Siġra tad-Dorf	
	Plectranthus amboinicus	Coleus amboinicus	Cuban oregano		
	Plumbago auriculata	Plumbago capensis	Cape Leadwort	Pjombini tal-ġonna	
	Plumbago europaea		European Plumbago	Pjombina selvaġġa	
	Poa angustifolia	Poa pratensis subsp. angustifolia	Narrow-leaved Meadow Grass		
	Poa annua	Ochlopoa annua	Annual Meadow Grass	Mellieġ kommuni	
	Poa bulbosa	Poa crispa	Bulbous Meadow Grass		
	Poa infirma	Ochlopoa infirma	Early Meadowgrass		
	Poa pratensis	Poa attica	Smooth Meadowgrass	Mellieġ tal-egħlieqi	
	Poa trivialis subsp. sylvicola	Poa sylvicola	Wild Meadowgrass		
	Poa trivialis subsp. trivialis		Rough Meadowgrass		
	Podospermum laciniatum	Scorzonera laciniata	Divided-leaved Viper's Grass		
	Polycarpon alsinifolium		Few-flowered Allseed		
	Polycarpon diphyllum		Two-leaved Allseed		
	Polycarpon tetraphyllum		Four-leaved Allseed		
	Polygala monspeliaca		Mediterranean Milkwort		
	Polygala myrtifolia	Polygala x dalmaisiana	African Milkwort		
	Polygonatum multiflorum	Convallaria multiflora	Solomon's Seal		
	Polygonum arenastrum	Polygonum aviculare subsp. arenastrum	Prostrate Knotgrass		
	Polygonum aviculare	Polygonum nanum	Knotgrass	Lewża tar-raba	
	Polygonum bellardii	Polygonum nudum	Narrow-leaved Knotgrass		
	Polygonum equisetiforme	Polygonum caesaraugustanum	Horsetail Knotweed		
	Polygonum maritimum		Sea Knotgrass	Lewża tal-baħar	
	Polypodium vulgare subsp. melitensis		Maltese Polypody	Felċi ta' Malta	
	Polypogon maritimus	Alopecurus maritimus	Sea Beard Grass	Denb il-liebru tax-xatt	
	Polypogon monspeliensis	Alopecurus monspeliensis	Annual Beard Grass	Denb il-liebru kbir	
	Polypogon subspathaceus	Polypogon maritimus subsp. subspathaceus	Greater Annual Beard Grass	Denb il-liebru żgħir	
	Polypogon viridis	Polypogon semiverticillatus	Water Bent Grass	Denb il-liebru	
	Populus alba	Populus canadensis	White Poplar	Siġra tal-Luq	
	Populus nigra		Black Poplar	Siġra tal-Luq sewda	
	Portulaca oleracea		Purslane	Burdlieqa	
	Posidonia oceanica		Posidonia	Alka	
	Potamogeton pectinatus	Stuckenia pectinata	Fennel Pondweed		
	Potentilla reptans		Creeping Cinquefoil	Frawla selvaġġa	
	Prasium majus		White Hedge-Nettle	Te` Sqalli	
	Prospero autumnale	Scilla autumnalis	Autumn Squill	Għansar tal-Ħarifa	
	Prunus armeniaca	Armeniaca vulgaris	Apricot	Berquqa	
	Prunus cerasifera	Prunus divaricata	Cherry Plum	Għanbaqar	
	Prunus cerasus	Prunus acida	Dwarf Cherry	Amarena	
	Prunus domestica subsp. domestica	Prunus communis	Plum	Pruna	
	Prunus dulcis	Prunus amygdalus	Almond	Lewża	
	Prunus insititia	Prunus domestica subsp. Insititia	Bullace		
	Prunus mahaleb	Cerasus mahaleb	Mahaleb Cherry		
	Prunus persica	Persica vulgaris	Peach	Ħawħa	
	Prunus persica var. nucipersica	Prunus persica var. nectarina	Nectarine	Nuċiprisk	
	Prunus spinosa		Blackthorn	Prajn tax-xewk	
	Pseudorlaya pumila	Caucalis pumila	Small Carrot	Zunnarija tar-ramel	
	Pteranthus dichotomus		Pteranthus		
	Pteridium aquilinum	Pteris aquilinum	Bracken Fern	Feliċilla	
	Pteris cretica		Cretan Brake	Pteris	
	Pteris vittata	Pteris longifolia	Ladder Brake	Pteris	
	Puccinellia fasciculata	Poa fasciculata	Borrier's Saltmarsh Grass	Puċċinelja	
	Pulicaria dysenterica	Inula dysenterica	Common Fleabane		
	Pulicaria odora	Inula odora	Mediterranean Fleabane		
	Punica granatum		Pomegranate	Rummiena	
	Putoria calabrica	Asperula calabrica	Stinking Madder	Putorja	
	Pyrus amygdaliformis	Pyrus nivalis	Almond-leaved Pear	Lanġas selvaġġ	
	Pyrus communis		Common Pear	Lanġas	
	Pyrus communis var. bambinella		Small Maltese June Pear	Bambinella	
	Pyrus pyraster	Pyrus communis subsp. achras	Wild Pear	Lanġas Bagħal	
	Pyrus syriaca		Syrian Pear	Lanġas tal-Vant	

== Q ==
Image	Species name	Synonym	Common name	Maltese name	Ref
	Quercus ilex	Quercus calicina	Evergreen Oak	Balluta	
	Quercus robur	Quercus pedunculata	Pedunculate Oak	Balluta ingliża	

== R ==
Image	Species name	Synonym	Common name	Maltese name	Ref
	Ranunculus arvensis	Ranunculus tuberculatus	Corn Buttercup		
	Ranunculus bulbosus subsp. aleae	Ranunculus aleae	Bulbous Buttercup		
	Ranunculus bullatus		Autumn Buttercup	Ċfolloq tal-ħarifa	
	Ranunculus chius		Eastern Buttercup		
	Ranunculus ficaria	Ficaria ranunculoides	Lesser Celandine	Fomm il-għeliem	
	Ranunculus macrophyllus	Ranunculus palustris subsp. macrophyllus	Large-leaved Buttercup		
	Ranunculus muricatus		Scilly Buttercup	Ċfolloq	
	Ranunculus ophioglossifolius		Adder's tongue Buttercup	Ċfolloq tal-Għadajjar	
	Ranunculus paludosus		Fan-Leaved Buttercup	Ċfolloq tax-xagħri	
	Ranunculus saniculifolius	Ranunculus peltatus subsp. fucoides	Sanicle-leaved Water Crowfoot	Ċfolloq ta' l-ilma	
	Ranunculus sardous	Ranunculus parvulus	Hairy Buttercup		
	Ranunculus trichophyllus	Batrachium trichophyllum	Thread-leaved Water Crowfoot	Ċfolloq tal-widien	
	Ranunculus trilobus	Ranunculus vilaenadalis	Three-leaved Buttercup		
	Raphanus raphanistrum subsp. landra		Italian Wild Radish		
	Raphanus raphanistrum subsp. maritimus		Maritime Wild radish	Ravanell salvaġġ tal-baħar	
	Raphanus raphanistrum subsp. raphanistrum		Wild Radish	Ravanell salvaġġ	
	Raphanus sativus	Raphanus niger	Garden Radish	Ravanell	
	Rapistrum rugosum		Annual Bastard Cabbage	Mustarda taż-żibeġ	
	Reichardia intermedia	Picridium intermedium	Mediterranean Reichardia		
	Reichardia picroides	Picridium vulgare	Common Reichardia	Kanċlita	
	Reseda alba	Reseda fruticulosa	White Mignonette	Denb il-ħaruf abjad	
	Reseda lutea	Reseda mucronata	Wild Mignonette	Denb il-ħaruf isfar	
	Rhagadiolus stellatus	Rhagadiolus edulis	Star Hyoseris	Tfief tal-istilla	
	Rhamnus alaternus		Mediterranean Buckthorn	Alaternu	
	Rhamnus oleoides	Rhamnus lycoides subsp. oleoides	Olive-leaved Buckthorn	Żiju	
	Rhodalsine geniculata	Minuartia geniculata	Woody Sandwort	Ramlina Għawdxija	
	Rhus coriaria	Toxicodendron coriaria	Sumach Tree	Xumakk tal-Konz	
	Rhus lancea		African Sumach Tree	Xumakk tal-Afrika	
	Ricinus communis		Castor Oil Tree	Riġnu	
	Ridolfia segetum	Meum segetum	False fennel	Bużbież il-qamħ	
	Robinia pseudoacacia		False Acacia	Robinja	
	Romulea bulbocodium	Crocus bulbocodium	Mediterranean sand crocus	Żagħfran tal-Blat kbir	
	Romulea columnae	Trichonema columnae	Lesser sand crocus	Żagħfran tal-blat ċar	
	Romulea melitensis		Maltese tufted sand crocus	Zagħfran tal-blat ta' Malta mqanfed	
	Romulea ramiflora		Sand Crocus (branched)	Żagħfran tal-blat skars	
	Romulea variicolor		Maltese Sand Crocus		
	Rosa canina	Rosa prutensis	Dog Rose		
	Rosa gallica	Rosa crenulata	Provence Rose	Warda taż-żejt	
	Rosa rubiginosa	Rosa eglanteria	Sweet Briar	Warda tal-weraq ifuħ	
	Rosa sempervirens	Rosa sylvestris	Evergreen Rose	Girlanda tal-wied	
	i		Rosemary	Klin	
	Rostraria cristata	Lophochloa cristata	Annual Cat's Tail	Denb il-qattus	
	Rubia peregrina	Rubia tinctorium	Wild Madder	Ħarxajja selvaġġa	
	Rubus caesius		Dewberry		
	Rubus ulmifolius	Rubus rusticanus	Bramble	Għollieq	
	Rumex bucephalophorus	Acetosa bucephalophora	Red Dock	Selq ħamrani	
	Rumex conglomeratus	Rumex glomeratus	Clustered Dock	Qarsajja tal-ilma	
	Rumex crispus	Rumex elongatus	Curly Dock		
	Rumex cristatus	Rumex graecus	Crested Dock	Qarsajja kbira	
	Rumex obtusifolius	Rumex acutus	Broad-leaved Dock		
	Rumex pulcher	Rumex lyratus	Fiddle Dock		
	Rumex sanguineus		Red-Veined Dock		
	Ruppia drepanensis		Lesser Tassel-Pondweed	Ruppja tal-Għadira	
	Ruppia maritima	Ruppia brachypus	Beaked Tassel Pondweed	Ruppja tas-Salini	
	Ruscus aculeatus		Butcher's Broom	Niggiżet il-far	
	Ruscus hypophyllum		Greater Butcher's Broom	Belladonna	
	Ruta chalepensis	Ruta bracteosa	Wall Rue	Fejġel	

== S ==
Image	Species name	Synonym	Common name	Maltese name	Ref
	Sagina apetala		Annual Pearlwort		
	Sagina maritima		Sea Pearlwort	Ġawhra tax-xatt	
	Sagina procumbens		Procumbent Pearlwort		
	Salicornia appressa	Salicornia ramosissima	Twiggy Glasswort	Almeridja	
	Salicornia fruticosa	Sarcocornia fruticosa, Salicornia europaea var. fruticosa	Shrubby Glasswort	Almeridja arbuxxel tal-blat	
	Salix alba		White Willow	Żafżafa kbira	
	Salix pedicellata		Mediterranean Willow	Żafżafa żgħira	
	Salsola kali	Kali australis	Saltwort	Ħaxixa tal-irmied xewwikija	
	Salsola melitensis	Darniella melitensis	Maltese Salt Tree	Xebb	
	Salsola soda	Kali soda	Opposite-leaved Saltwort	Ħaxixa tal-irmied	
	Salvia fruticosa	Salvia triloba	Three-lobed Sage	Salvja ta' Sqallija	
	Salvia officinalis		Common sage	Salvja tal-ikel	
	Salvia verbenaca		Wild Sage	Salvja selvaġġa	
	Sambucus ebulus		Dwarf Elder	Sebuqa Selvaġġa	
	Sambucus nigra		Common Elder	Sebuqa Kbira	
	Samolus valerandi		Brookweed	Ħarira tal-ilma	
	Sanguisorba minor subsp. muricata	Poterium sanguisorba	Salad Burnet	Tursin il-għawl	
	Santolina chamaecyparissus	Santonlina incana	Lavender Cotton		
	Sarcopoterium spinosum	Poterium spinosum	Thorny Burnet	Tursin il-Għul Xewwieki	
	Saxifraga tridactylites		Rue-leaved Saxifrage		
	Scabiosa atropurpurea		Sweet Scabiosa	Skabjoża ħamra	
	Scabiosa maritima	Sixalix atropurpurea subsp. maritima	Southern Scabiosa	Skabjoża	
	Scandix pecten-veneris	Pecten veneris	Shepherd's needle	Maxxita	
	Schedonorus arundinaceus	Festuca arundinacea	Tall Fescue	Żwien	
	Schefflera polybotrya		Schefflera	Xefflera	
	Schinus molle		Drooping False Pepper	Siġra tal-Bżar tal-friegħi mdendlin	
	Schinus terebinthifolius		Brazilian pepper	Siġra tal-Bżar	
	Schoenoplectus lacustris	Scirpus lacustris	Common Clubrush		
	Schoenoplectus tabaernemontani	Scirpus tabernaemontani	Grey Clubrush		
	Schoenus nigricans		Black Bog Rush	Simar iswed	
	Scilla peruviana	Scilla clusii	Portuguese Squill	Għansar tal-ġonna	
	Scilla sicula	Scilla peruviana var. sicula	Sicilian Squill	Għansal ikħal	
	Scirpus cernuus	Isolepis cernua	Slender Clubrush		
	Scirpus holoschoenus	Holoschoenus vulgaris	Round-headed Clubrush	Simar tal-boċċi	
	Scirpus maritimus	Bolboschoenus maritimus	Sea Clubrush	Simar tal-baħar	
	Scolymus grandiflorus	Scolymus hispanicus subsp. grandiflorus	Large-flowered Golden Thistle	Xewk isfar kbir	
	Scolymus hispanicus		Common Golden Thistle	Xewk isfar	
	Scolymus maculatus	Scolymus paniculatus	Spotted Golden Thistle	Xewk isfar tar-riga bajda	
	Scorpiurus muricatus	Scorpiurus subvillosus	Many-flowered Scorpiurus	Widna	
	Scrophularia auriculata	Scrophularia aquatica	Water Figwort	Fiswet il-kelb tal-ilma	
	Scrophularia peregrina		Nettle-leaved Figwort	Fiswet il-kelb	
	Secale cereale		Cereal Rye	Segala	
	Sedum album	Sedum vermiculifolium	White Stonecrop		
	Sedum caeruleum	Sedum heptapetalum	Azure Stonecrop	Beżżulet il-baqra	
	Sedum caespitosum	Sedum rubrum	Broad-leaved Stonecrop		
	Sedum dasyphyllum	Sedum burnatii	Thick-leaved Stonecrop		
	Sedum litoreum	Sedum marichalii	Coastal Stonecrop	Beżżul il-baqra safra	
	Sedum rubens	Sedum ibicense	Red Stonecrop	Beżżul il-baqra ħamra	
	Sedum sediforme	Sedum altissimum	Mediterranean Stonecrop	Sedum	
	Sedum stellatum	Asterosedum stellatum	Starry Stonecrop		
	Selaginella denticulata	Lycopodium denticulatum	Tooth-leaved Clubmoss	Selaġinella	
	Senecio angulatus	Senecio tamoides	Creeping Groundsel	Kubrita xeblieka	
	Senecio leucanthemifolius		Coastal Ragwort	Kromb Tax-Xatt	
	Senecio pygmaeus	Senecio leucanthemifolius var. pygmaeus	Pygmy Ragwort	Kubrita nana	
	Senecio vulgaris		Common Groundsel	Kubrita	
	Senna alexandrina	Cassia alexandrina	Alexandrian Senna		
	Senna pendula	Cassia bicapsularis	Christmas Senna		
	Serapias bergonii	Serapias vomeracea subsp. laxiflora	Eastern Ploughshare	Orkida tal-Ilsien tal-Lvant	
	Serapias cordigera	Serapias ovalis	Heart-flowered Tongue Orchid	Orkida tal-qalb	
	Serapias lingua	Serapias columnae	Tongue Orchid	Orkida tal-ilsien	
	Serapias parviflora	Serapias lingua subsp. parviflora	Small-flowered Tongue Orchid	Orkida tal-ilsien iż-żgħira	
	Serapias vomeracea	Serapias longipetala	Long-lipped Tongue Orchid	Orkida tal-ilsien il-kbira	
	Setaria adhaerens	Panicum adhaerens	Sticky Bristle Grass	Xrika komuni	
	Setaria italica	Panicum italicum	Italian Bristle Grass	Xrika tal-Mediterran	
	Setaria palmifolia		Malaysian Palm Grass	Xrika bil-weraq tal-palm	
	Setaria pumila	Panicum pumilum	Yellow Foxtail	Xrika sufija	
	Setaria verticillata	Panicum verticillatum	Rough Bristle Grass	Xrika	
	Setaria viridis	Panicum viride	Green Bristle Grass	Xrika ħadra	
	Sherardia arvensis		Field Madder	Ħarxajja tal-għelieqi	
	Sideritis romana		Common Siderits	Sideritis	
	Silene behen		Hairless Catchfly		
	Silene bellidifolia	Silene vespertina	Dense-flowered Catchfly		
	Silene coeli-rosa	Lychnis coelirosa	Rose Catchfly		
	Silene colorata		Pink Pirouette	Ilsien l-għasfur	
	Silene fruticosa		Woody Catchfly	Lsien l-Għasfur tal-Blat	
	Silene gallica		Small-flowered Catchfly		
	Silene nocturna		Night-flowering Catchfly	Lsien l-għasfur ta' bil-lejl	
	Silene pendula		Drooping Catchfly		
	Silene sedoides		Hairy Catchfly	Lsien l-għasfur irqiq	
	Silene vulgaris subsp. angustifolia	Silene angustifolia	Narrow-leaved Bladder Campion	Qasqejża tal-weraq dojjoq	
	Silene vulgaris subsp. vulgaris		Bladder Campion	Qasqejża	
	Silybum marianum	Silybum eburneum	Milk Thistle	Xewk tal-Madonna	
	Sinapis alba		White Mustard	Mustarda	
	Sinapis arvensis	Brassica arvensis	Charlock	Mustarda selvaġġa	
	Sisymbrium altissimum	Sisymbrium pannonicum	Tumble Mustard		
	Sisymbrium irio		London Rocket	Libsiena komuni	
	Sisymbrium officinale		Hedge Mustard	Mustarda rqiqa	
	Sisymbrium orientale	Sisymbrium columnae	Oriental Hedge Mustard		
	Smilax aspera		Mediterranean Smilax	Zalza pajżana	
	Smyrnium olusatrum	Smyrnium vulgare	Alexanders	Karfus il-ħmir	
	Solanum elaeagnifolium		Silver-leaf Nightshade		
	Solanum linnaeanum	Solanum sodmeum	Brown Nightshade		
	Solanum nigrum		Black Nightshade	Għeneb id-dib iswed	
	Solanum tuberosum		Potato	Patata	
	Solanum villosum	Solanum luteum	Yellow Nightshade	Għeneb id-dib isfar	
	Sonchus asper	Sonchus oleraceus var. asper	Prickly Sow Thistle	Tfief ċar	
	Sonchus oleraceus		Smooth Sow Thistle	Tfiefa komuni	
	Sonchus tenerrimus		Mediterranean Sow Thistle	Tfief fin	
	Sorbus aucuparia	Pyrus aucuparia	Rowan	Żorba Selvaġġa	
	Sorbus domestica	Pyrus domestica	Service Tree	Żorba	
	Sorghum bicolor	Holcus bicolor	Sweet Sorghum	Qaraboċċ	
	Sorghum halepense	Holcus halepense	Aleppo Millet	Qaraboċċ selvaġġ	
	Sparganium erectum	Sparganium ramosum	Branched Bur-Reed		
	Spartium junceum	Genista juncea	Spanish Broom	Ġenista safra	
	Spergularia bocconei		Boccone's Sea-Spurrey		
	Spergularia diandra	Spergularia salsuginea	Southern Sea-Spurrey		
	Spergularia media	Spergularia marginata	Greater Sea-Spurrey	Arenarja	
	Spergularia purpurea		Purple Sand-Spurrey		
	Spergularia rubra	Spergularia campestris	Sand Spurrey	Arenarja roża	
	Spergularia salina	Spergularia marina	Lesser Sea-Spurrey		
	Sphenopus divaricatus	Poa divaricata	Coastal Grass		
	Spinacia oleracea	Spinacia glabra	Spinach	Spinaċi	
	Spiranthes spiralis	Spiranthes autumnalis	Autumn Lady's Tresses	Ħajja u mejta tal-ħarifa	
	Spirodela oligorrhiza	Lemna oligorrhiza	Dotted Duckweed	Lemna ta' ftit gheruq	
	Sporobolus pungens	Agrostis pungens	Sand Dropseed	Niġem tar-ramel	
	Stachys ocymastrum		Hairy Woundwort	Betonika	
	Stellaria apetala	Stellaria pallida	Lesser Chickweed	Ħarira bajda	
	Stellaria cupaniana	Stellaria media subsp. cupaniana	Cupani's chickweed		
	Stellaria media		Common Chickweed		
	Stellaria neglecta	Stellaria media subsp. neglecta	Greater Chickweed		
	Stenotaphrum secundatum	Ischaemum secundatum	St. Augustine's Grass		
	Stipa capensis	Stipa humilis	Common Awn Grass	Nixxief tal-isteppa	
	Stipa pennata	Stipa disjuncta	Southern Awn Grass		
	Suaeda maritima	Chenopodium maritimum	Common Seablite	Swejda tal-baħar	
	Suaeda vera	Suaeda fruticosa subsp. vera	Shrubby Seablite	Swejda	

== T ==
Image	Species name	Synonym	Common name	Maltese name	Ref
	Tamarix africana	Tamarix hispanica	African Tamarisk	Bruka	
	Tamarix gallica	Tamarix anglica	Common Tamarisk	Bruka Franċiża	
	Tamarix parviflora	Tamarix cretica	Small-flowered Tamarisk	Bruka roża	
	Tamus communis	Dioscorea communis	Black Bryony	Brijonja sewda	
	Tara spinosa		Tara		
	Taraxacum minimum	Taraxacum briganti	Early Dandelion	Ċikwejra selvaġġa	
	Tecoma capensis	Tecomaria capensis	Cape Honeysuckle		
	Tecoma smithii	Stenolobium alatum	Orange Trumpet Flower		
	Tecoma stans	Stenolobium stans	Yellow Trumpet Flower		
	Tetraclinis articulata	Thuja articulata	Sandarac Gum Tree	Siġra tal-Għargħar	
	Tetragonolobus purpureus	Lotus tetragonolobus	Crimson Dragon's Teeth	Fiġġiela ħamra	
	Teucrium flavum		Yellow Germander	Borgħom komuni	
	Teucrium fruticans		Olive-leaved Germander	Żebbuġija	
	Teucrium scordium subsp. scordioides		Water Germander	Borgħom tal-ilma	
	Theligonum cynocrambe	Cynocrambe prostrata	Dog Cabbage	Ħabaq il-ħnieżer	
	Thesium humile		Field Bastard Toadflax		
	Thevetia peruviana	Cascabela thevetia	Yellow Oleander	Tevja	
	Thlaspi perfoliatum	Thlaspi rotundifolium	Perfoliate Penny Cress		
	Thuja orientalis	Platyclados orientalis	Thuya		
	Thymbra capitata	Thymbrus capitatus	Mediterranean Thyme	Sagħtar	
	Tordylium apulum	Condylocarpus apulus	Mediterranean Hartwort	Ħaxixet it-trieraħ	
	Torilis arvensis	Caucalis arvensis	Spreading Hedge Parsley	Tursin selvaġġ	
	Torilis nodosa	Caucalis arvensis	Knotted Hedge Parsley	Tursin xewwieki	
	Trachelium caeruleum		Trachelium		
	Tribulus terrestris		Maltese Cross	Salib tal-art	
	Trifolium angustifolium		Narrow-leaved Clover	Xnien tal-werqa rqieqa	
	Trifolium campestre	Trifolium procumbens	Hop Clover	Xnien isfar	
	Trifolium fragiferum		Strawberry Clover		
	Trifolium lappaceum	Trifolium rhodense	Bur Clover		
	Trifolium lucanicum	Trifolium scabrum var. lucanicum	Lucana's clover		
	Trifolium nigrescens		Small White Clover	Xnien abjad	
	Trifolium pratense		Red Clover	Xnien ta' l-eghlieqi	
	Trifolium repens		White Clover		
	Trifolium resupinatum	Trifolium clusii	Reversed Clover	Xnien maqlub	
	Trifolium scabrum		Rough Clover	Xnien inħaxlet	
	Trifolium squarrosum	Trifolium dipsaceum	Squarrose Clover		
	Trifolium stellatum		Starry clover	Xnien ta' l-istilla Stilel	
	Trifolium subterraneum		Subterranean Clover	Xnien midfun	
	Trifolium suffocatum		Suffocated Clover	Xnien moħbi	
	Trifolium tomentosum	Trifolium curvisepalum	Woolly Clover	Xnien tar-raba	
	Triglochin bulbosa subsp. barrelieri		Bulbous Arrowgrass	Ħaxixa tal-baħar tar-rebbiegħa	
	Triglochin bulbosa subsp. laxiflora		Lesser Arrowgrass	Ħaxixa tal-baħar tal-ħarifa	
	Trigonella maritima	Trigonella dura	Sea Trigonella		
	Triplachne nitens	Agrostis nitens	Shining Grass	Triplanke	
	Tripodion tetraphyllum	Anthyllis tetraphylla	Annual Kidney Vetch	Silla tal-bżieżel	
	Trisetaria aurea	Trisetum aureum	Golden Oat	Trisetarja	
	Triticum aestivum	Triticum vulgare	Bread Wheat	Qamħ tomni	
	Triticum turgidum subsp. durum	Triticum durum	Macaroni Wheat	Qamħ ta' Malta	
	Triticum turgidum subsp. turgidum	Triticum aestivum var. turgidum	Rivet Wheat	Qamħ tal-Awstralja	
	Tropaeolum majus	Trophaeum majus	Garden Nasturtium	Kapuċċinella	
	Tulbaghia violacea	Tulbaghia cepacea	Society Garlic	Tewm vjola	
	Tulipa australis	Tulipa sylvestris subsp. australis	Southern Tulip	Tulipan selvaġġ	
	Typha domingensis		Southern Bulrush	Buda	

== U ==
Image	Species name	Synonym	Common name	Maltese name	Ref
	Ulmus americana	Ulmus alba	American elm	Ulmu Amerikan	
	Ulmus canescens	Ulmus minor subsp. canescens	Hoary Elm	Nemmiesa	
	Ulmus glabra	Ulmus montana	Wych Elm	Ulmu	
	Ulmus minor	Ulmus minor subsp. minor	Small-leaved Elm	Ulmu	
	Ulmus procera		English elm	Ulmu Ingliż	
	Umbilicus horizontalis	Umbilicus intermedium	Narrow Navelwort	Żokret l-għaġuża	
	Umbilicus rupestris	Umbilicus vulgaris	Wall Navelwort	Żokret l-għaġuża tal-irdum	
	Urochloa panicoides		Liverseed Grass	Uruklowa	
	Urospermum picroides	Tragopogon picroides	Prickly Golden Fleece	Tfief xewwieki	
	Urtica dioica		Common Nettle		
	Urtica membranacea	Urtica dubia	Large-leaved Nettle	Ħurrieqa komuni	
	Urtica pilulifera		Roman Nettle	Ħurrieq taż-żibeġ	
	Urtica urens		Small Nettle	Ħurrieq żgħir	

== V ==
Image	Species name	Synonym	Common name	Maltese name	Ref
	Vaccaria hispanica, synonym of Gypsophila vaccaria (Cowherb)	Vaccaria pyramidata, synonym of Gypsophila vaccaria			
	Valantia hispida		Hairy Valantia	Valantja niggieża	
	Valantia muralis		Wall Valantia	Valantja komuni	
	Valerianella eriocarpa	Fedia eriocarpa	Hairy-fruited Cornsalad	Valerjanella	
	Valerianella microcarpa	Valerianella dentata var. microcarpa	Small-fruited Cornsalad		
	Valerianella muricata	Valerianella truncata	Oblique-fruited Cornsalad		
	Verbascum creticum	Celsia cretica	Glandular Mullein		
	Verbascum sinuatum		Wavy-leaved Mullein	Xatbet l-andar	
	Verbascum thapsus		Great Mullein		
	Verbena officinalis		Common Verbena	Buqexrem	
	Veronica agrestis		Green Field Speedwell		
	Veronica anagallis-aquatica		Blue Water Speedwell	Veronika tal-ilma	
	Veronica arvensis		Wall Speedwell		
	Veronica cymbalaria		Pale Speedwell	Veronika bajda	
	Veronica hederifolia		Ivy-leaved Speedwell	Veronika tal-weraq tal-liedna	
	Veronica panormitana	Veronica cymbalaria var. panormitana	Palermo Speedwell		
	Veronica persica		Common Field Speedwell		
	Veronica polita	Veronica didyma	Grey-leaved Speedwell	Veronika żgħira	
	Viburnum tinus	Tinus laurifolius	Laurustinus	Viburnum	
	Vicia bithynica		Bithynian Vetch	Ġilbiena ħoxna	
	Vicia faba	Faba vulgaris	Broad Bean	Fula	
	Vicia hirsuta	Ervum hirsutum	Hairy Tare		
	Vicia leucantha		Brown-fruited Vetch		
	Vicia lutea	Vicia hirta	Yellow Vetch		
	Vicia monantha	Vicia biflora	Barn Vetch		
	Vicia narbonensis		Narbonne Vetch	Ġilbiena ħoxna	
	Vicia pannonica		Hungarian Vetch		
	Vicia peregrina	Vicia leptophylla	Slender-leaved Vetch		
	Vicia sativa subsp. nigra		Common Vetch	Ġilbiena sewda	
	Vicia sativa subsp. sativa	Vicia communis	Common Vetch	Ġilbiena sewda	
	Vicia tenuissima	Vicia parviflora	Fine-leaved Vetch		
	Vicia tetrasperma	Vicia gemella	Smooth Tare		
	Vicia villosa	Vicia godronii	Fodder Vetch		
	Vinca major	Pervinca major	Greater Periwinkle	Pervinka	
	Viola odorata	Viola stolonifera	Sweet Violet	Vjola	
	Vitex agnus-castus		Chaste Tree	Siġret il-virgi	
	Vitis berlandierii	Vitis cinerea	Grapevine Rootstock		
	Vitis rupestris		Mountain grape		
	Vitis vinifera	Vitis laciniosa	Grape Vine	Dielja	
	Vitis vulpina		American Grape Vine		
	Vulpia bromoides	Festuca bromoides	Squirrel-tailed Fescue		
	Vulpia ciliata	Festuca ciliata	Ciliate Fescue	Sufija	
	Vulpia fasciculata	Festuca fasciculata	Dune Fescue	Ħortan tar-ramel	

== W ==
Image	Species name	Synonym	Common name	Maltese name	Ref
	Washingtonia filifera		California Fan Palm	Palma tal-imrewħa Messikana	
	Washingtonia robusta		Mexican Fan Palm	Palma tal-imrewħa Amerikana	
	Wigandia caracasana	Wigandia urens var. caracasana	Wigandia		
	Withania somnifera	Physalis somnifera	Mediterranean Withania		
	Wolffia arrhiza		Rootless Duckweed		

== X ==
Image	Species name	Synonym	Common name	Maltese name	Ref
	Xanthium spinosum	Acanthoxanthium spinosum	Spiny Cocklebur		
	Xanthium strumarium		Rough Cocklebur		

== Y ==
Image	Species name	Synonym	Common name	Maltese name	Ref
	Yucca aloifolia	Yucca yucatana	Spanish Bay	Yukka	
	Yucca gloriosa	Yucca elephantipes	Spanish Dagger	Yukka	

== Z ==
Image	Species name	Synonym	Common name	Maltese name	Ref
	Zannichellia major	Zannichellia palustris var. major	Greater Horned Pondweed	Ħarira tal-widien	
	Zannichellia melitensis		Maltese Horned Pondweed	Ħarira tal-ilma ta' Malta	
	Zantedeschia aethiopica		Arum Lily	Buqar	
	Zea mays		Maize	Qamħ ir-rum	
	Ziziphus zizyphus	Ziziphus sativus	Jujube	Żinżel	
	Zostera marina		Eelgrass	Alka tas-Salini	
	Zostera noltii		Dwarf Eelgrass	Alka tal-Pwales	
