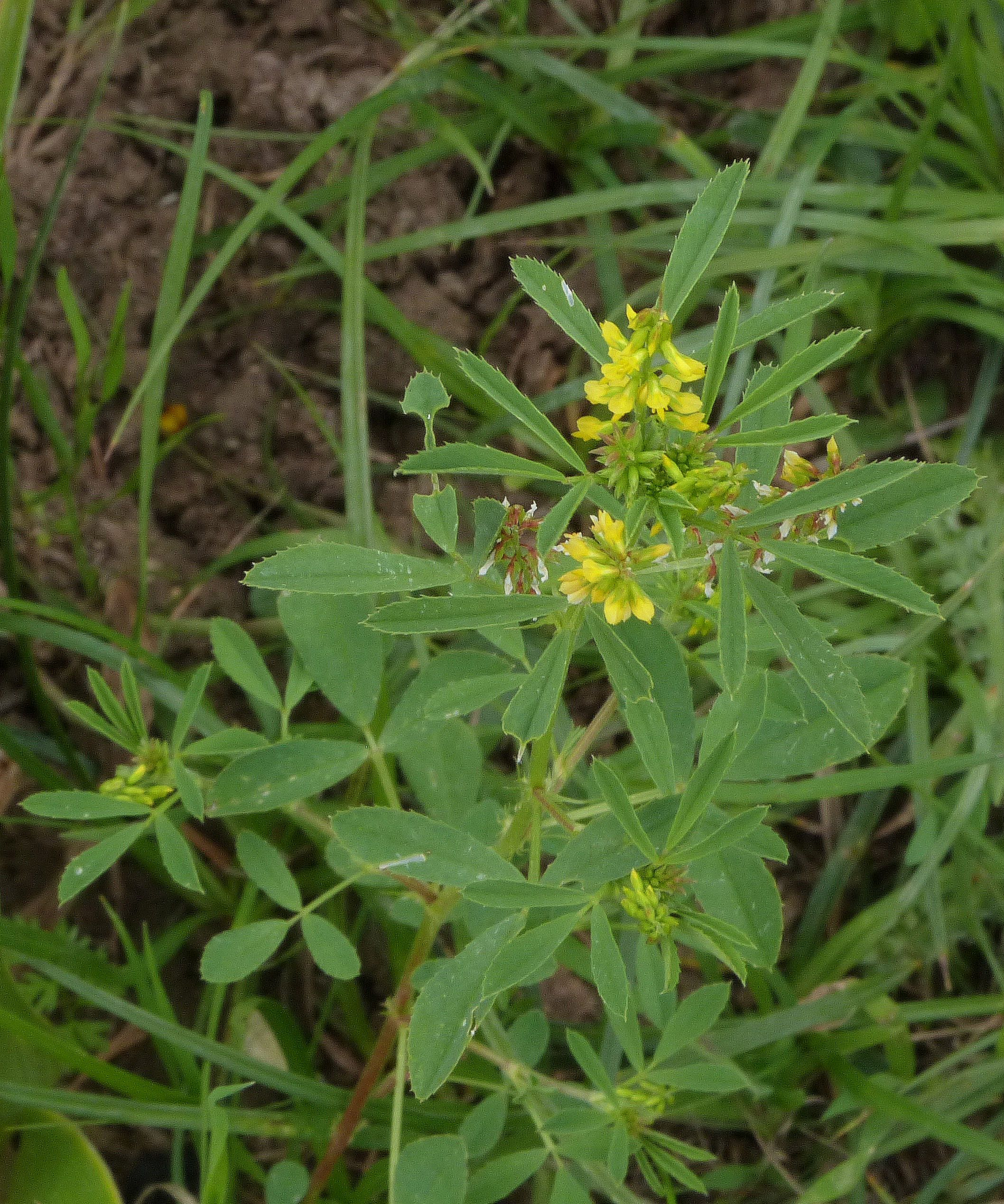

Scientific classification
- Kingdom: Plantae
- Clade: Tracheophytes
- Clade: Angiosperms
- Clade: Eudicots
- Clade: Rosids
- Order: Fabales
- Family: Fabaceae
- Subfamily: Faboideae
- Genus: Melilotus
- Species: M. messanensis

Binomial name
- Melilotus messanensis (L.)All.

Synonyms
- Melilotus siculus

= Melilotus messanensis =

Species of plant

Melilotus messanensis is a species of annual herb in the family Fabaceae. They have a self-supporting growth form and compound, broad leaves.

== Sources ==
This article incorporates text from a free content work. Licensed under CC0 (license statement/permission). Text taken from Melilotus messanensis. Encyclopedia of Life.
