= Dwarf snapdragon =

Dwarf snapdragon is a common name for several plants and may refer to:

- Antirrhinum majus
- Antirrhinum molle
- Chaenorhinum minus, native to Europe
