= Rhodalsine geniculata =

Scientific classification
- Kingdom: Plantae
- Clade: Tracheophytes
- Clade: Angiosperms
- Clade: Eudicots
- Order: Caryophyllales
- Family: Caryophyllaceae
- Genus: Rhodalsine
- Species: R. geniculata

Binomial name
- Rhodalsine geniculata (Poir.) F. N. Williams

Synonyms
- Minuartia geniculata

Species of plant

Rhodalsine geniculata is a species of plants in the family Caryophyllaceae (carpetweeds).

== Sources ==
This article incorporates text from a free content work. Licensed under CC0 (license statement/permission). Text taken from Rhodalsine geniculata. Encyclopedia of Life.
