= Crucianella rupestris =

Scientific classification
- Kingdom: Plantae
- Clade: Embryophytes
- Clade: Tracheophytes
- Clade: Angiosperms
- Clade: Eudicots
- Clade: Asterids
- Order: Gentianales
- Family: Rubiaceae
- Genus: Crucianella
- Species: C. rupestris

Binomial name
- Crucianella rupestris L.

Synonyms
- Crucianella maritima var. rupestris

Species of plant

Crucianella rupestris is a species of shrub in the family Rubiaceae. They have a self-supporting growth form and simple leaves. Individuals can grow to 20 cm tall.

== Sources ==
This article incorporates text from a free content work. Licensed under CC0 (license statement/permission). Text taken from Crucianella rupestris. Encyclopedia of Life.
