= Plantago crypsoides =

Scientific classification
- Kingdom: Plantae
- Clade: Tracheophytes
- Clade: Angiosperms
- Clade: Eudicots
- Clade: Asterids
- Order: Lamiales
- Family: Plantaginaceae
- Genus: Plantago
- Species: P. crypsoides

Binomial name
- Plantago crypsoides Boiss.

Species of plant

Plantago crypsoides is a species of annual herb in the family Plantaginaceae. They have a self-supporting growth form and simple, broad leaves.

== Sources ==
This article incorporates text from a free content work. Licensed under CC0 (license statement/permission). Text taken from Plantago crypsoides. Encyclopedia of Life.
