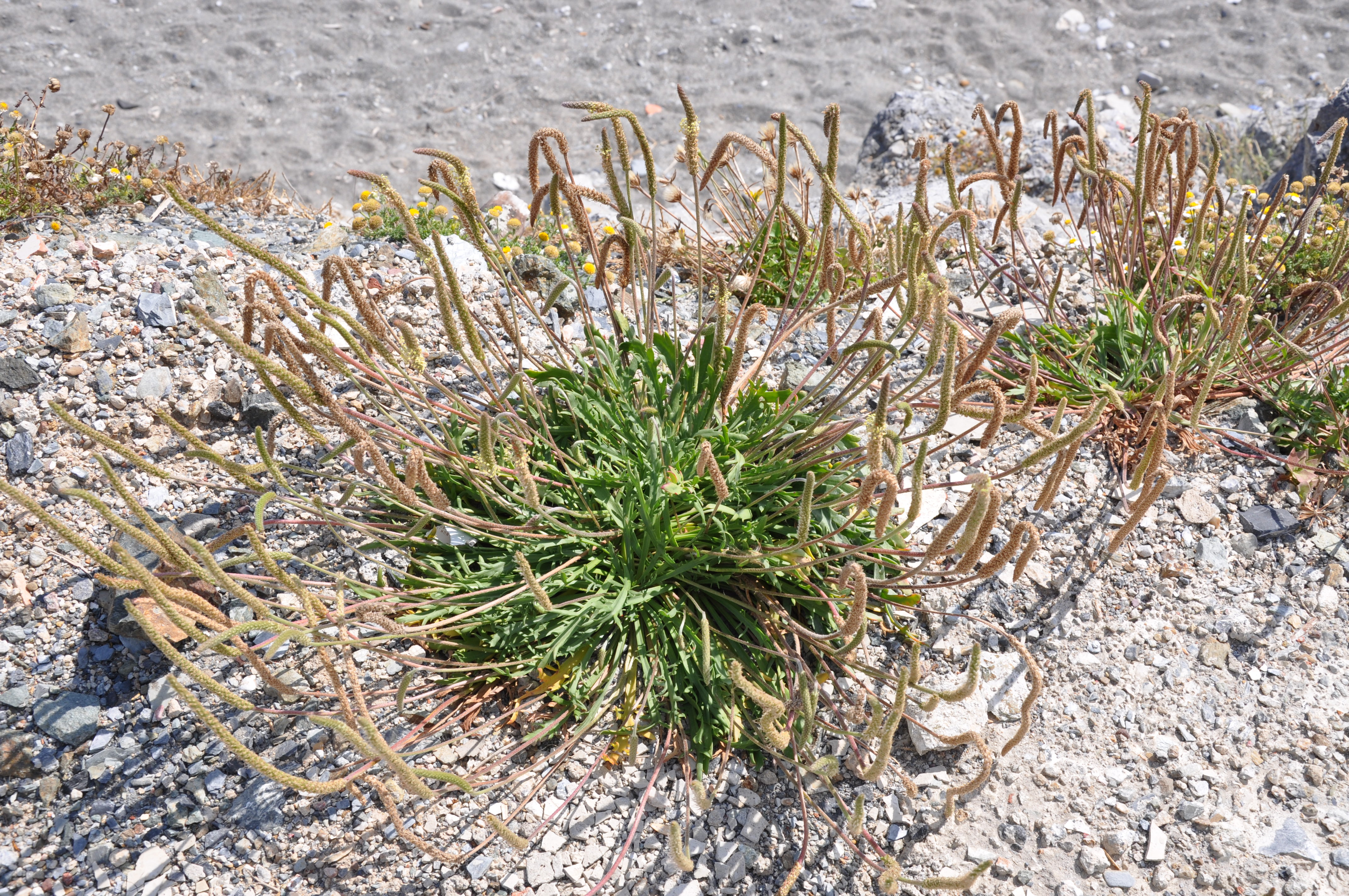

Scientific classification
- Kingdom: Plantae
- Clade: Tracheophytes
- Clade: Angiosperms
- Clade: Eudicots
- Clade: Asterids
- Order: Lamiales
- Family: Plantaginaceae
- Genus: Plantago
- Species: P. macrorrhiza

Binomial name
- Plantago macrorrhiza Poir.

Synonyms
- Plantago coronopus subsp. macrorrhiza

= Plantago macrorrhiza =

Species of plant

Plantago macrorhiza is a species of perennial herb in the family Plantaginaceae. Individuals can grow to 5 cm.

== Sources ==
This article incorporates text from a free content work. Licensed under CC0 (license statement/permission). Text taken from Plantago macrorrhiza. Encyclopedia of Life.
