= Lycium ferrocissimum =

Scientific classification
- Kingdom: Plantae
- Clade: Tracheophytes
- Clade: Angiosperms
- Clade: Eudicots
- Clade: Asterids
- Order: Solanales
- Family: Solanaceae
- Genus: Lycium
- Species: L. ferrocissimum

Binomial name
- Lycium ferrocissimum Miers

Synonyms
- Lycium macrocalyx

Species of plant

Lycium ferocissimum, the African boxthorn, is a species of shrub in the family Solanaceae (nightshades). They have a self-supporting growth form. Individuals can grow to 1.5 m.

== Sources ==
This article incorporates text from a free content work. Licensed under CC0 (license statement/permission). Text taken from Lycium ferrocissimum. Encyclopedia of Life.
