= Silver wormwood =

Silver wormwood may refer to at least two species of plants in the genus Artemisa:

- Artemisia cana, native to western and central North America
- Artemisia ludoviciana
