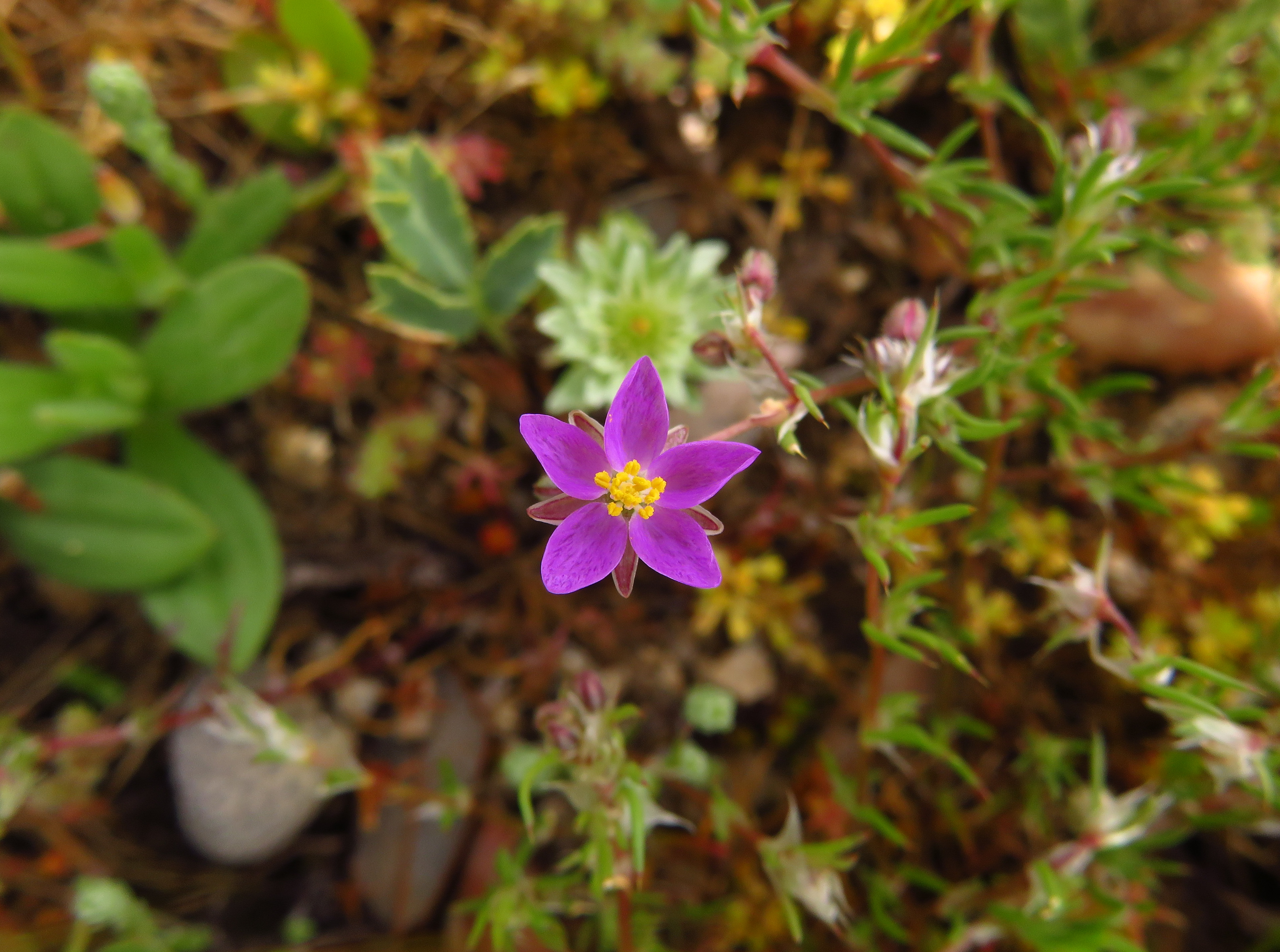

Scientific classification
- Kingdom: Plantae
- Clade: Tracheophytes
- Clade: Angiosperms
- Clade: Eudicots
- Order: Caryophyllales
- Family: Caryophyllaceae
- Genus: Spergularia
- Species: S. purpurea

Binomial name
- Spergularia purpurea (Pers.) G. Don fil.

= Spergularia purpurea =

Species of plant

Spergularia purpurea, the purple sandspurry, is a species of annual herb in the family Caryophyllaceae (carpetweeds). They have a self-supporting growth form and simple, broad leaves. Individuals can grow to 9 cm.

== Sources ==
This article incorporates text from a free content work. Licensed under CC0 (license statement/permission). Text taken from Spergularia purpurea. Encyclopedia of Life.
