= Launaea resedifolia =

Scientific classification
- Kingdom: Plantae
- Clade: Tracheophytes
- Clade: Angiosperms
- Clade: Eudicots
- Clade: Asterids
- Order: Asterales
- Family: Asteraceae
- Genus: Launaea
- Species: L. resedifolia

Binomial name
- Launaea resedifolia (L.) Kuntze

Synonyms
- Zollikoferia resedifolia

Species of plant

Launaea resedifolia is a plant species in the family Asteraceae.

== Sources ==
This article incorporates text from a free content work. Licensed under CC0 (license statement/permission). Text taken from Launaea resedifolia. Encyclopedia of Life.
