= Polypogon subspathaceus =

Scientific classification
- Kingdom: Plantae
- Clade: Tracheophytes
- Clade: Angiosperms
- Clade: Monocots
- Clade: Commelinids
- Order: Poales
- Family: Poaceae
- Subfamily: Pooideae
- Genus: Polypogon
- Species: P. subspathaceus

Binomial name
- Polypogon subspathaceus Willd.

Synonyms
- Polypogon maritimus subsp. subspathaceus

Species of plant

Polypogon maritimus, the Mediterranean rabbitsfoot grass, is a species of annual herb in the family Poaceae (true grasses). They have a self-supporting growth form. Individuals can grow to 0.17 m.

== Sources ==
This article incorporates text from a free content work. Licensed under CC0 (license statement/permission). Text taken from Polypogon subspathaceus. Encyclopedia of Life.
