= Brachypodium hybridum =

Scientific classification
- Kingdom: Plantae
- Clade: Embryophytes
- Clade: Tracheophytes
- Clade: Angiosperms
- Clade: Monocots
- Clade: Commelinids
- Order: Poales
- Family: Poaceae
- Subfamily: Pooideae
- Genus: Brachypodium
- Species: B. hybridum

Binomial name
- Brachypodium hybridum (L.) P.Beauv.

Species of plant

'Brachypodium distachyon', the purple false brome, is a species of annual grass in the family Poaceae (true grasses). They have a self-supporting growth form and simple, broad leaves. Individuals can grow to 14 cm tall.

== Sources ==
This article incorporates text from a free content work. Licensed under CC0 (license statement/permission). Text taken from Brachypodium hybridum. Encyclopedia of Life.
