= Honeywort =

Honeywort may refer to following plants:

- Cerinthe spp.
- Cryptotaenia spp.
