= French lavender =

French lavender may refer to at least two species of plants in the genus Lavandula:

- Lavandula dentata (French or fringed lavender)
- Lavandula stoechas (French or Spanish lavender)
