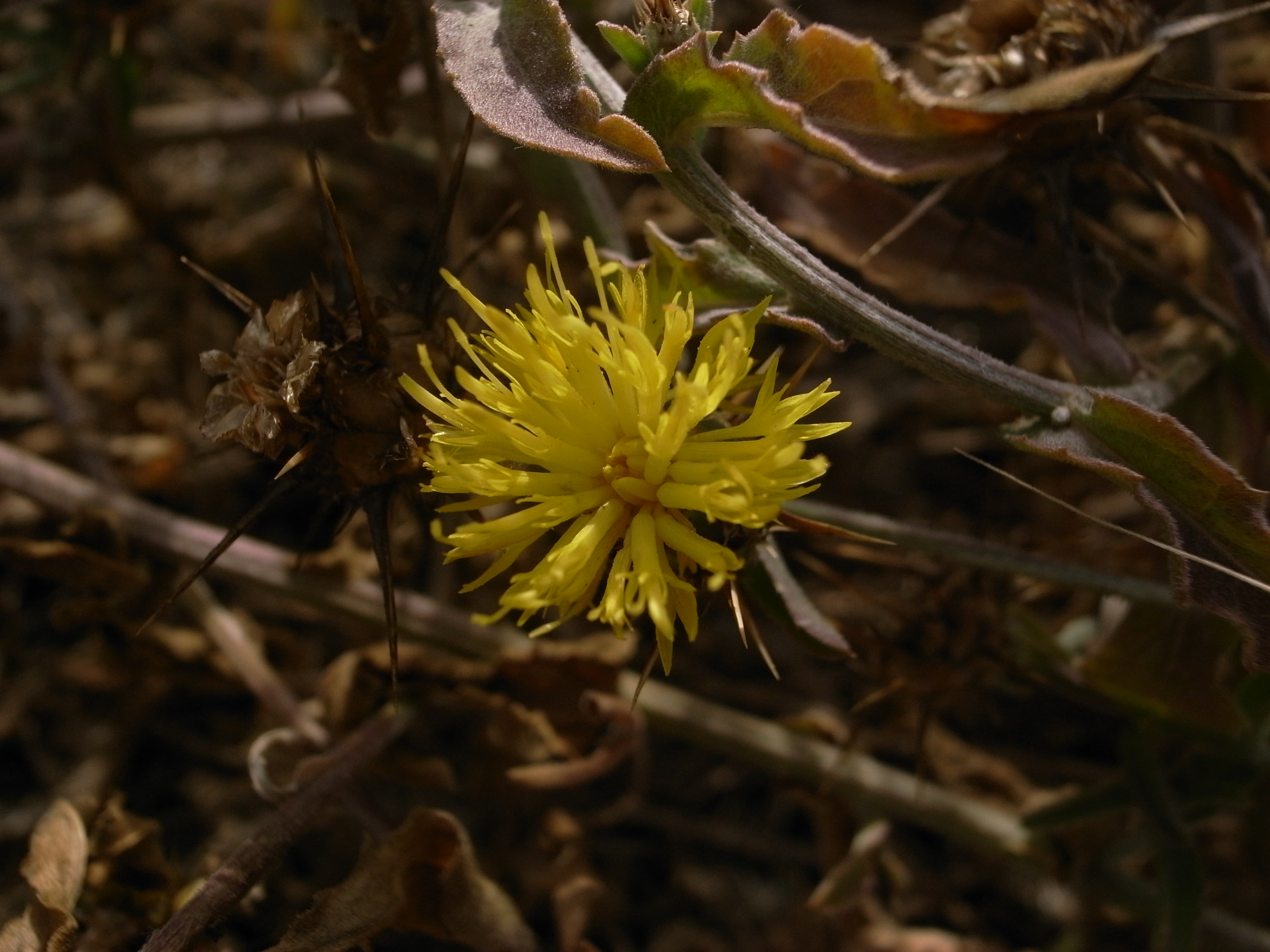

Scientific classification
- Kingdom: Plantae
- Clade: Tracheophytes
- Clade: Angiosperms
- Clade: Eudicots
- Clade: Asterids
- Order: Asterales
- Family: Asteraceae
- Genus: Centaurea
- Species: C. nicaeensis

Binomial name
- Centaurea nicaeensis All.

= Centaurea nicaeensis =

Species of plant

Centaurea nicaeensis is a plant species in the family Asteraceae.

== Sources ==
This article incorporates text from a free content work. Licensed under CC0 (license statement/permission). Text taken from Centaurea nicaeensis. Encyclopedia of Life.
