= Common fleabane =

Common fleabane is a common name for several flowering plants and may refer to:

- Erigeron philadelphicus, native to North America
- Pulicaria dysenterica, native to Europe and western Asia
