= Crepis pusilla =

Scientific classification
- Kingdom: Plantae
- Clade: Tracheophytes
- Clade: Angiosperms
- Clade: Eudicots
- Clade: Asterids
- Order: Asterales
- Family: Asteraceae
- Genus: Crepis
- Species: C. pusilla

Binomial name
- Crepis pusilla (Somm.) Merxm.

Synonyms
- Melitella pusilla

Species of plant

Crepis pusilla is a species of plants in the family Asteraceae.

== Sources ==
This article incorporates text from a free content work. Licensed under CC0 (license statement/permission). Text taken from Crepis pusilla. Encyclopedia of Life.
