= Delphinium halteratum =

Scientific classification
- Kingdom: Plantae
- Clade: Tracheophytes
- Clade: Angiosperms
- Clade: Eudicots
- Order: Ranunculales
- Family: Ranunculaceae
- Genus: Delphinium
- Species: D. halteratum

Binomial name
- Delphinium halteratum Sm.

Synonyms
- Delphinium longipes

Species of plant

Delphinium halteratum is a species of plant in the family Ranunculaceae.

== Sources ==
This article incorporates text from a free content work. Licensed under CC0 (license statement/permission). Text taken from Delphinium halteratum. Encyclopedia of Life.
