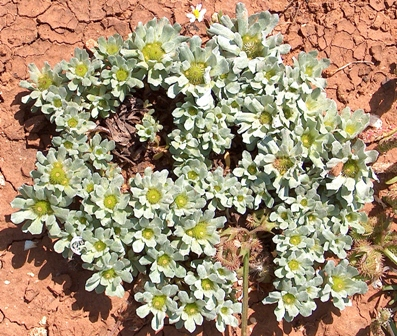

Scientific classification
- Kingdom: Plantae
- Clade: Tracheophytes
- Clade: Angiosperms
- Clade: Eudicots
- Clade: Asterids
- Order: Asterales
- Family: Asteraceae
- Genus: Evax
- Species: E. pygmaea

Binomial name
- Evax pygmaea (L.) Brot.

Synonyms
- Filago pygmaea

= Evax pygmaea =

Species of plant

Evax pygmaea is a plant species in the family Asteraceae.

== Sources ==
This article incorporates text from a free content work. Licensed under CC0 (license statement/permission). Text taken from Evax pygmaea. Encyclopedia of Life.
