= Early forget-me-not =

Early forget-me-not can refer to:

- Myosotis ramosissima
- Myosotis verna
