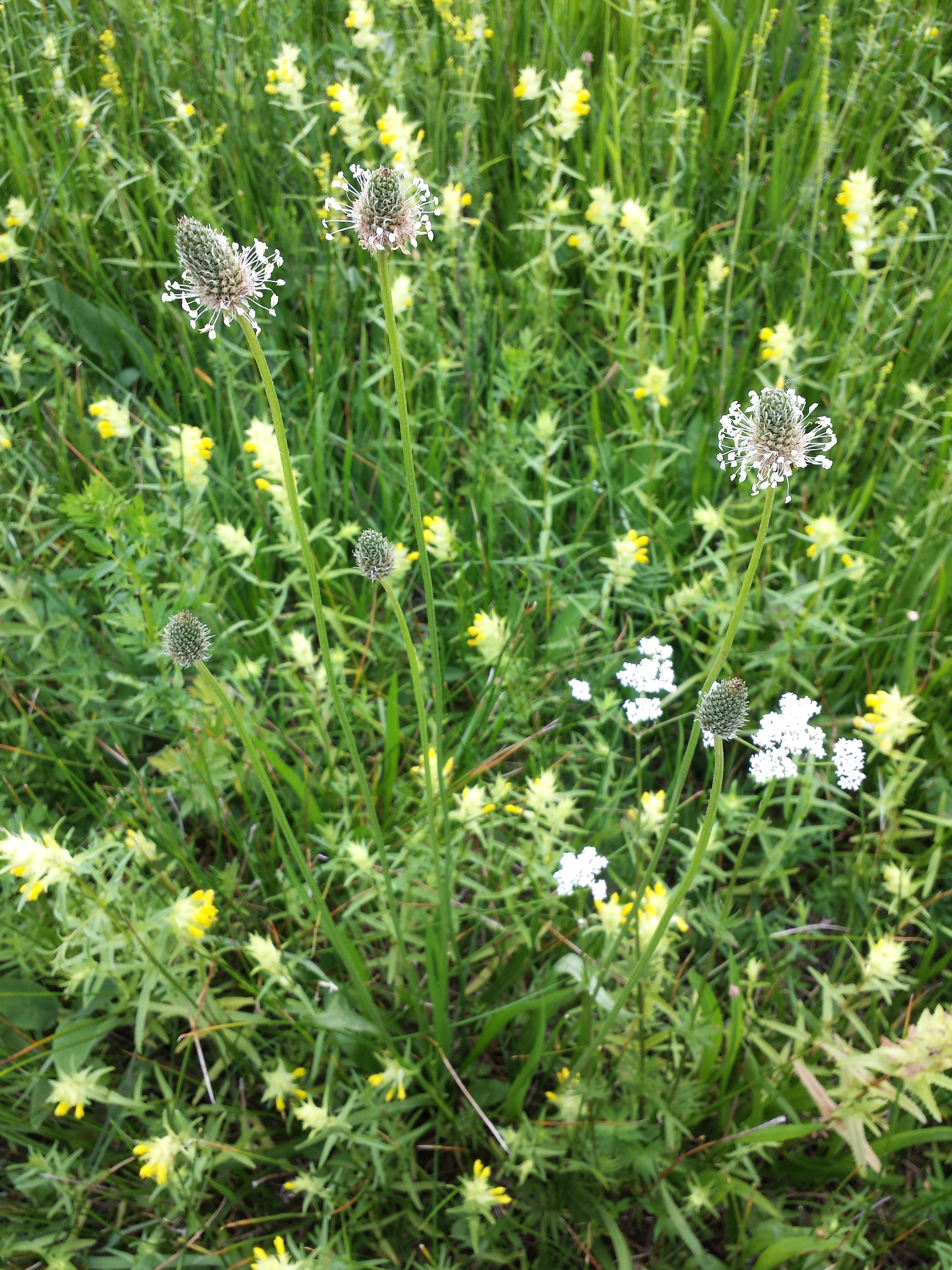

Scientific classification
- Kingdom: Plantae
- Clade: Tracheophytes
- Clade: Angiosperms
- Clade: Eudicots
- Clade: Asterids
- Order: Lamiales
- Family: Plantaginaceae
- Genus: Plantago
- Species: P. altissima

Binomial name
- Plantago altissima L.

= Plantago altissima =

Species of plant

Plantago altissima is a species of perennial herb in the family Plantaginaceae. They have a self-supporting growth form and simple, broad leaves. Individuals can grow to 0.58 m.

== Sources ==
This article incorporates text from a free content work. Licensed under CC0 (license statement/permission). Text taken from Plantago altissima. Encyclopedia of Life.
