= Jardin botanique de Nice =

Municipal botanical garden in Provence-Alpes-Côte d'Azur, France

Coordinates: 43.6851°N 7.2101°E

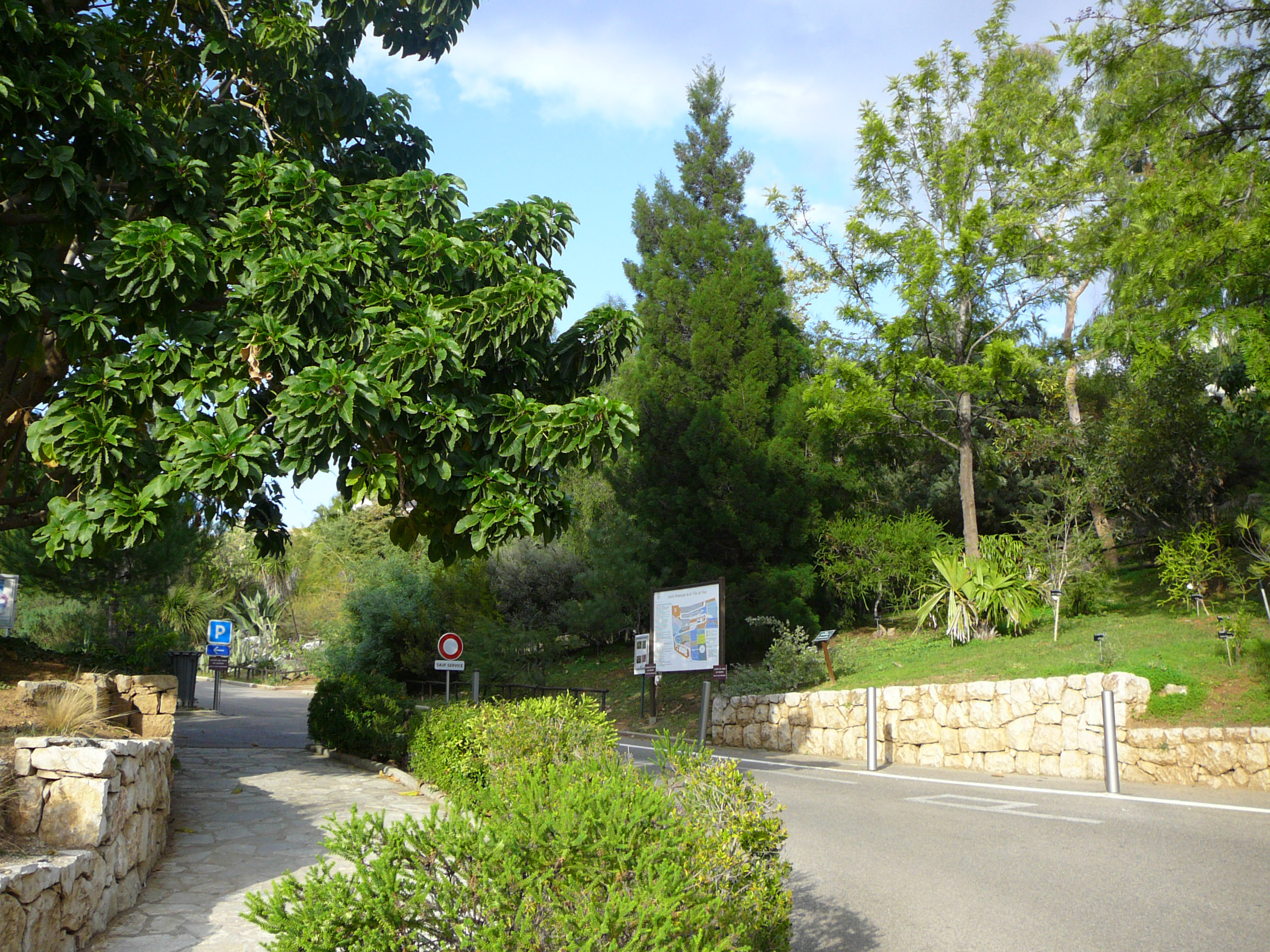
- Interactive map of Jardin botanique de Nice
- Type: Botanical garden
- Location: Nice, Alpes-Maritimes, Provence-Alpes-Côte d'Azur, France
- Created: 1983

The Jardin botanique de la Ville de Nice (3.5 hectares), also known as the Jardin botanique de Nice, is a municipal botanical garden located at 78 avenue de la Corniche Fleurie, Nice, Alpes-Maritimes, Provence-Alpes-Côte d'Azur, France. It is open daily without charge.

== History ==
The garden was begun in 1983 with an initial planting of 100 species from the city's Musée d'Histoire Naturelle (Museum of Natural History). It opened to the public in 1991.

== Contents ==
Today the garden contains more than 3,500 plant species, mainly Mediterranean, including collections of trees (300 taxa), herbaceous plants (800 taxa), medicinal plants (150 spp.), Cistaceae, Rhamnaceae, Lamiaceae, Genista, Acacia, Salvia, Phlomis, Rosa, Dianthus, Yucca, Iris, Pelargonium, Opuntia, Stipa, Teucrium, Astragalus, and Cistus. It is organized into areas representing zones of Mediterranean climate from around the world, including South Africa, South Australia, Mexico, Greece, Spain, Cyprus, the Near East, and the Canary Islands, as well as Central Asia, China, and Japan.

Of particular note are its collections of agaves, Cupressaceae, and sages. Protected plants include Allium chamaemoly, Allium trifoliatum, Ampelodesmos mauritanicus, Anemone coronaria, Carex grioletii, Centaurea pseudocaerulescens, Ceratonia siliqua, Chamaerops humilis, Cneorum tricoccon, Coronilla valentina, Cyrtomium fortunei, Drimia maritima, Heteropogon contortum, Lavatera maritima, Leucojum nicaeense, Limonium cordatum, Lotus tetragonolobus, Lysimachia tenella (syn. Anagallis tenella), Ophrys bertolonii, Papaver pinnatifidum, Picris altissima, Polystichum setiferum, Posidonia oceanica, Pteris cretica, Romulea columnae, Scilla hyacinthoides, Stipa capensis, Symphytum bulbosum, Tulipa clusiana, and Vitex agnus-castus.

The garden also contains a herbarium of some 6,000 species, with particular strength in phanerogams of the Mediterranean region and other Mediterranean climates, including Salvia, Phlomis, Astragalus, Cistaceae, and species cultivated in the garden.

== See also ==
- List of botanical gardens in France
