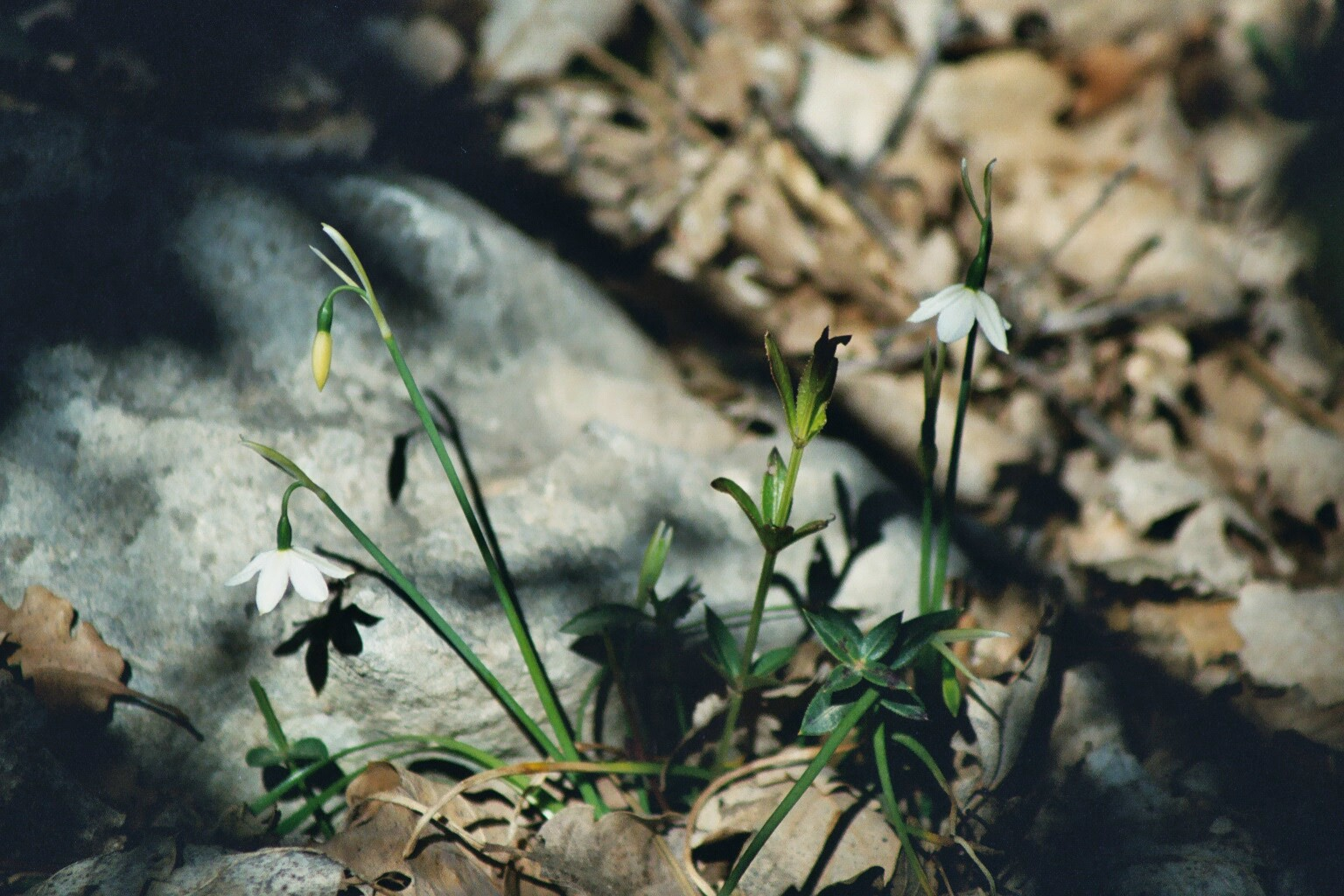

Scientific classification
- Kingdom: Plantae
- Clade: Tracheophytes
- Clade: Angiosperms
- Clade: Monocots
- Order: Asparagales
- Family: Amaryllidaceae
- Subfamily: Amaryllidoideae
- Genus: Acis
- Species: A. fabrei

Binomial name
- Acis fabrei (Quézel & Girerd) Lledó, A.P.Davis & M.B.Crespo

Synonyms
- Leucojum fabrei Quézel & Girerd

= Acis fabrei =

Species of flowering plant

Acis fabrei is a bulbous flowering plant in the family Amaryllidaceae, native to France. It has white flowers that appear in late spring after the leaves. Although first collected in 1882, it was not scientifically described until 1990. It is now known from only four populations in the Vaucluse department in south-east France, around Mont Ventoux and the River Nesque. It is considered to be a "threatened species".

== Description ==
Acis fabrei is a small bulbous perennial plant. Each bulb produces one to four narrow leaves, 2 to 5 mm wide and up to 20 cm (8 in) long, averaging around 17 cm (6.7 in). The leaves appear before the flowers. Flowering takes place in late spring with the flowers held considerably below the top of leaves. There is usually a single flower to each stem (peduncle), with six white tepals, 10–11 mm long, carried on a stalk (pedicel) 5–11 mm long. The flower bud is enclosed in a spathe that is divided into two segments. The style is slightly longer than the six stamens. The smooth black seeds are 2–3 mm long. The whole plant dies down in early summer.

== Taxonomy ==
Acis fabrei was first collected in 1882 on the southern slopes of Mont Ventoux. Specimens were sent to the National Museum of Natural History in Paris by the entomologist Jean-Henri Fabre. It was only re-discovered in the 1970s and 1980s. In 1990, it was first described as a new species, as Leucojum fabrei. In 2004, it was transferred to Acis, along with other species of Leucojum, on the basis of a molecular phylogenetic study. It resembles Acis nicaeensis, which has an overlapping distribution, but can be distinguished by several characters, including wider leaves, longer pedicels, and a larger distance between the stigma and the anthers.

== Distribution and habitat ==
As of 2007, Acis fabrei was only known from four populations in the Vaucluse department in south-east France, around Mont Ventoux and the River Nesque. All the populations are within 20 km (12 mi) of one another. Plants are found in eroded soils poor in organic matter, such as terra rossa, in rocky glades, grassy areas and under Quercus pubescens.

== Conservation ==
As of March 2007, Acis fabrei was not listed in the IUCN Red List, although listed as a "threatened species" in the French National Inventory of Natural Heritage. The species occurs in a generally protected region of France; two populations are in an area with a management plan that includes Acis fabrei. One threat is the natural and deliberate expansion of forests, which produces closed canopies and, where the trees are pines or cedars, more acid soils through the build-up of leaf litter. Wild boars are another threat as they can destroy many individual plants.
