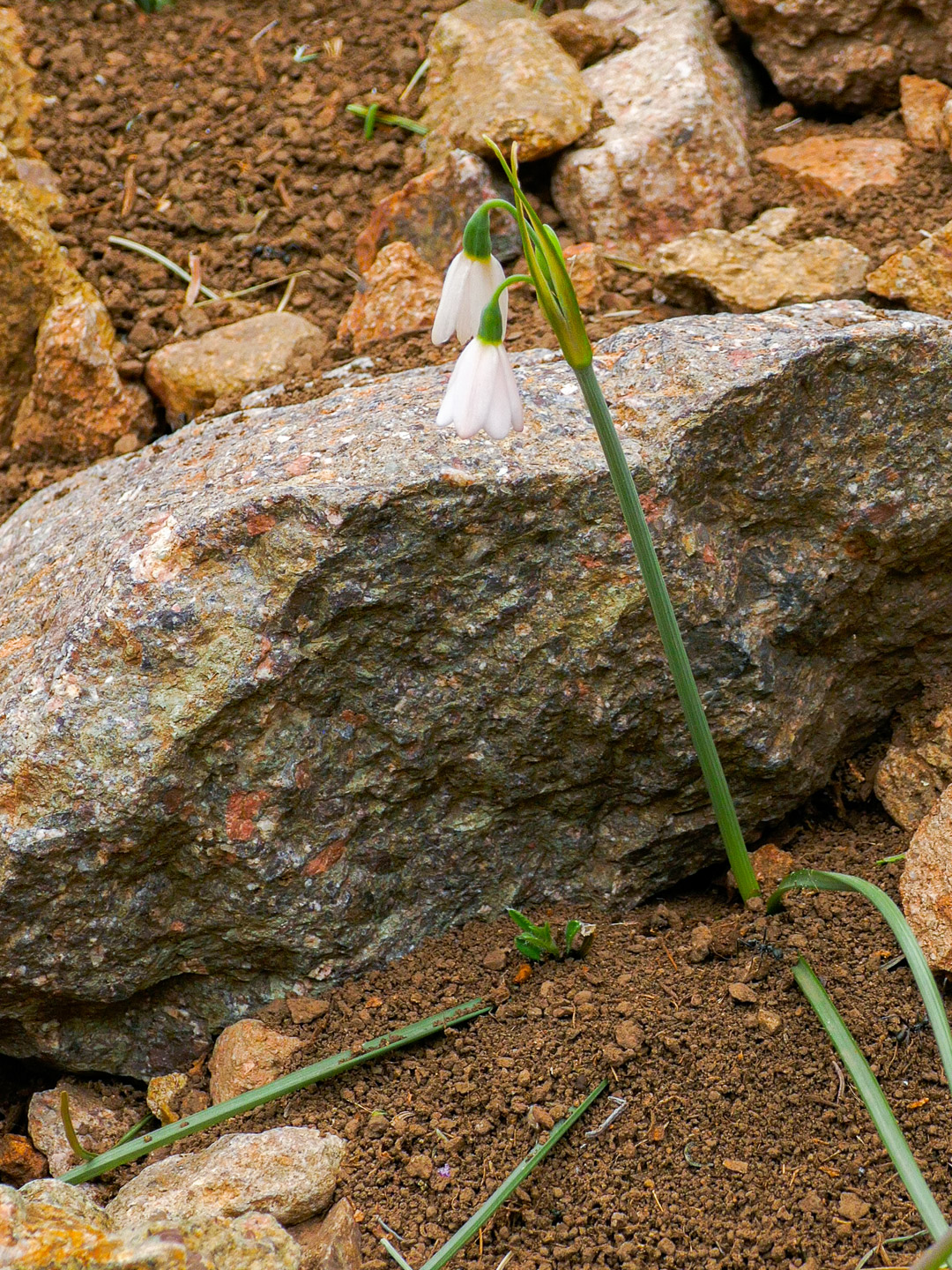

Scientific classification
- Kingdom: Plantae
- Clade: Tracheophytes
- Clade: Angiosperms
- Clade: Monocots
- Order: Asparagales
- Family: Amaryllidaceae
- Subfamily: Amaryllidoideae
- Genus: Acis
- Species: A. longifolia

Binomial name
- Acis longifolia J.Gay ex M.Roem.

Synonyms
- Leucojum longifolium (J.Gay ex M.Roem.) Gren.

= Acis longifolia =

Species of flowering plant in the amaryllis family

Acis longifolia is a species of flowering plant in the family Amaryllidaceae, endemic to Corsica. Its white flowers appear in spring. It is sometimes cultivated as an ornamental plant, but is not fully frost-hardy.

== Description ==
Acis longifolia resembles Acis trichophylla, but is smaller. The thin leaves are longer than the flowering stem. The flowers, which appear in spring, are borne in groups of usually two to four, each on a slender pedicel (stalk) up to 25 mm long. The flowers are 8–11 mm long, with tepals lacking points at the end and styles shorter than the stamens. There are two spathes, longer than the pedicels.

== Taxonomy ==
Acis longifolia was first described in 1847 in a work by Max Roemer, who attributed the name to Jaques Gay. In 1855, Jean Grenier transferred the species to Leucojum. In 2004, it was transferred back to Acis, along with other species of Leucojum, on the basis of a molecular phylogenetic study.

== Distribution and habitat ==
Acis longifolia is endemic to Corsica, where it is found among rocks and on mountain slopes up to about 500 m in elevation, often in partly shaded conditions.

== Cultivation ==
Acis longifolia is rare in cultivation; it is not fully hardy, requiring protection in cold area, such as in an alpine house or bulb frame.
