= Asparagus pea =

Asparagus pea is a common name for several plants and may refer to:

- Tetragonolobus purpureus, also known as the winged pea
- Psophocarpus tetragonolobus, also known as the winged bean
- Asparagus bean
