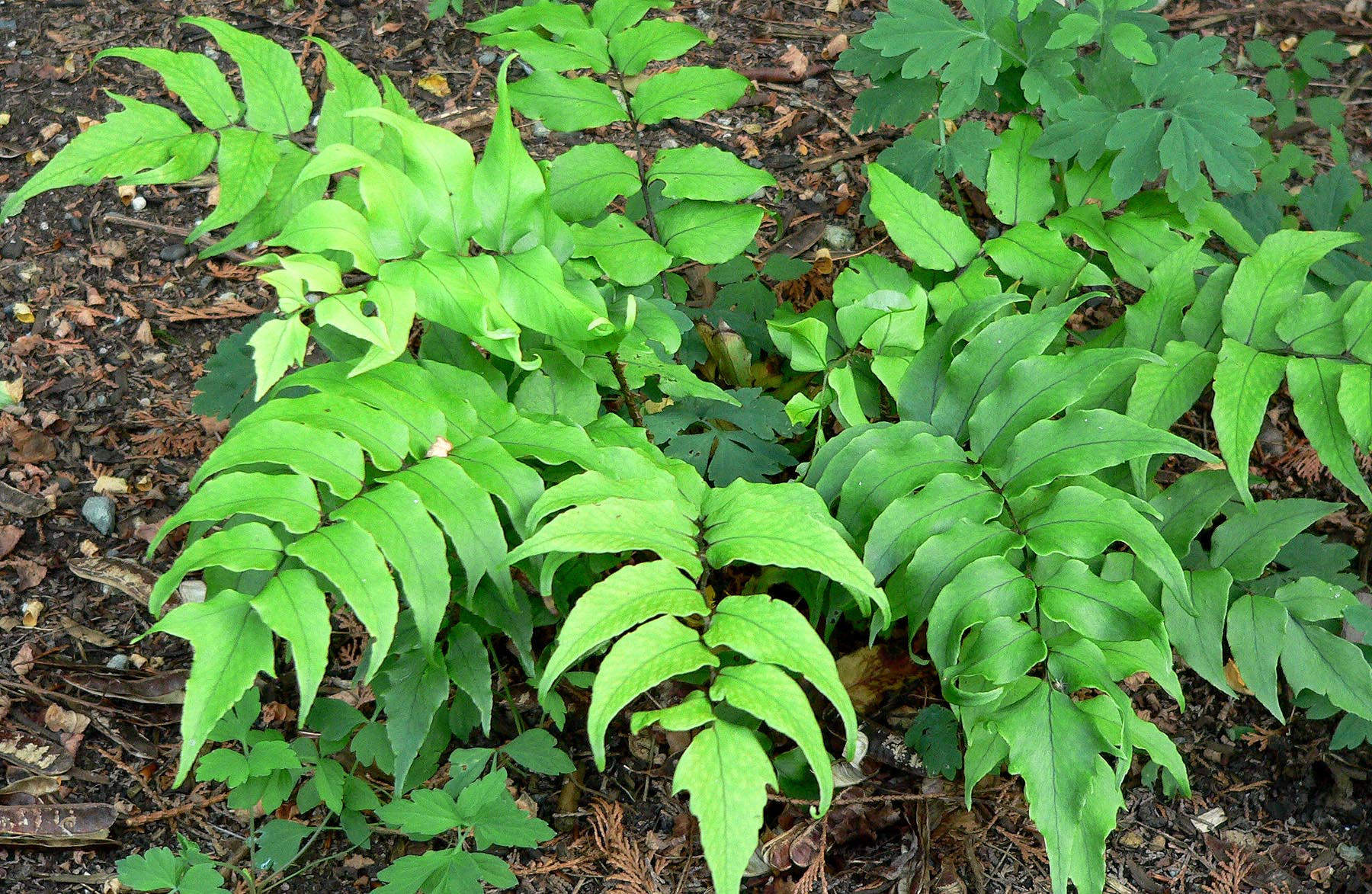

Conservation status
- Secure (NatureServe)

Scientific classification
- Kingdom: Plantae
- Clade: Embryophytes
- Clade: Tracheophytes
- Division: Polypodiophyta
- Class: Polypodiopsida
- Order: Polypodiales
- Suborder: Polypodiineae
- Family: Dryopteridaceae
- Genus: Cyrtomium
- Species: C. falcatum

Binomial name
- Cyrtomium falcatum (L.f.) C.Presl

Synonyms
- Polypodium falcatum L.f.; Aspidium falcatum (L.f.) Sw.; Dryopteris falcata (L.f.) Kuntze; Polystichum falcatum (L.f.) Diels; Phanerophlebia falcata (L.f.) Copel.; Cyrtomium yiangshanense Ching & Y.C.Lan

= Cyrtomium falcatum =

Species of fern native to Asia

Cyrtomium falcatum is a species of fern, commonly known as house holly-fern and Japanese holly fern, in the wood fern family Dryopteridaceae. It is native to eastern Asia.

It grows from crevices in coastal cliffs, stream banks, rocky slopes, and other moist, stable areas.

== Description ==
This fern is a perennial plant with a large light brown rhizome.

Cyrtomium falcatum has leaves exceeding 0.5 metres (1.6 ft) in length made up of six to ten pairs of shiny bright green leaflets. Each leathery leaflet has a flat to wavy to slightly toothed margin and a netlike pattern of veining. The underside of each leaflet has sori beneath brown or black indusia.

== Cultivation ==
Cyrtomium falcatum is a fairly common outdoor ornamental plant in temperate climates (zones 6 to 10), such as in the coastal counties of California; it is more common as an indoor houseplant in areas with very cold or hot conditions. The holly fern is reliably hardy compared to many other, more tropical species of fern; outdoors, it thrives in locations of low indirect light to deep shade, such as underneath trees or bushes. It may be propagated by spores, but is more commonly multiplied via rhizome division, rooting the fresh cuttings in a substrate of coconut fiber, sphagnum moss, or another well-aerated substrate. The cuttings should be kept evenly moist and shaded but not sitting in a pool of water.

Holly ferns planted either in containers or in the ground are not picky about soil composition or quality; like other ferns, they will even grow mounted or tied to driftwood, wooden boards, tree branches or rocks, provided there is some amount of sphagnum moss or other organic medium surrounding the rhizome and rootball and the plant receives adequate water. While soil quality is not of utmost importance, good drainage and aeration, combined with sufficient moisture retention, is a must. Fertilization is not required, as they are minimal feeders; however, a yearly or twice-yearly application of granular, time-released plant feed may be beneficial.

The holly fern plant has gained the Royal Horticultural Society's Award of Garden Merit.

The holly fern has escaped from cultivation in some regions of the world, and has become established in the wild as an introduced species. It can now be found in much of Mediterranean Europe, North America, the Atlantic Islands, Australia, New Zealand, and South America. It is classified as a weed in most of Australia.

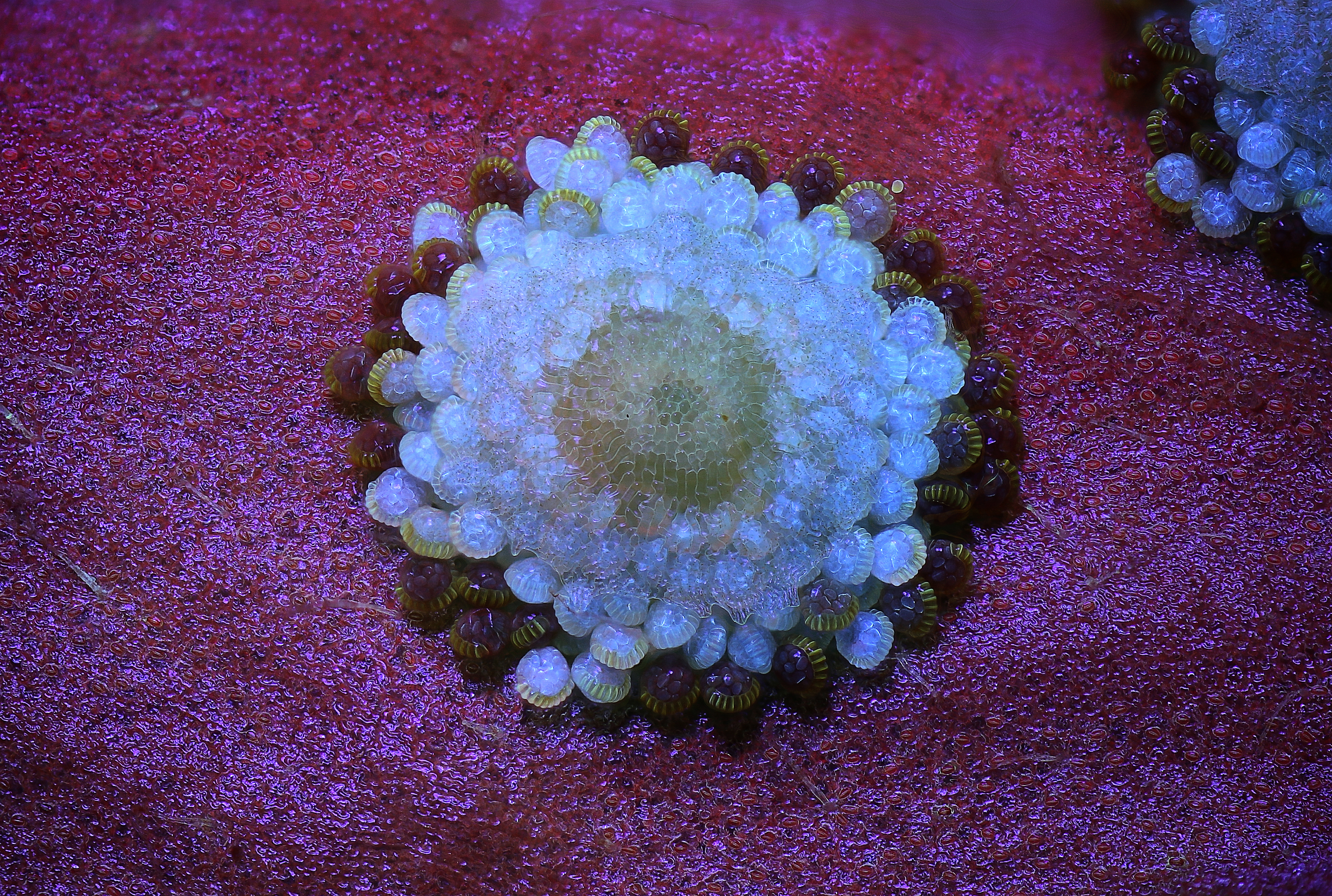
Sorus

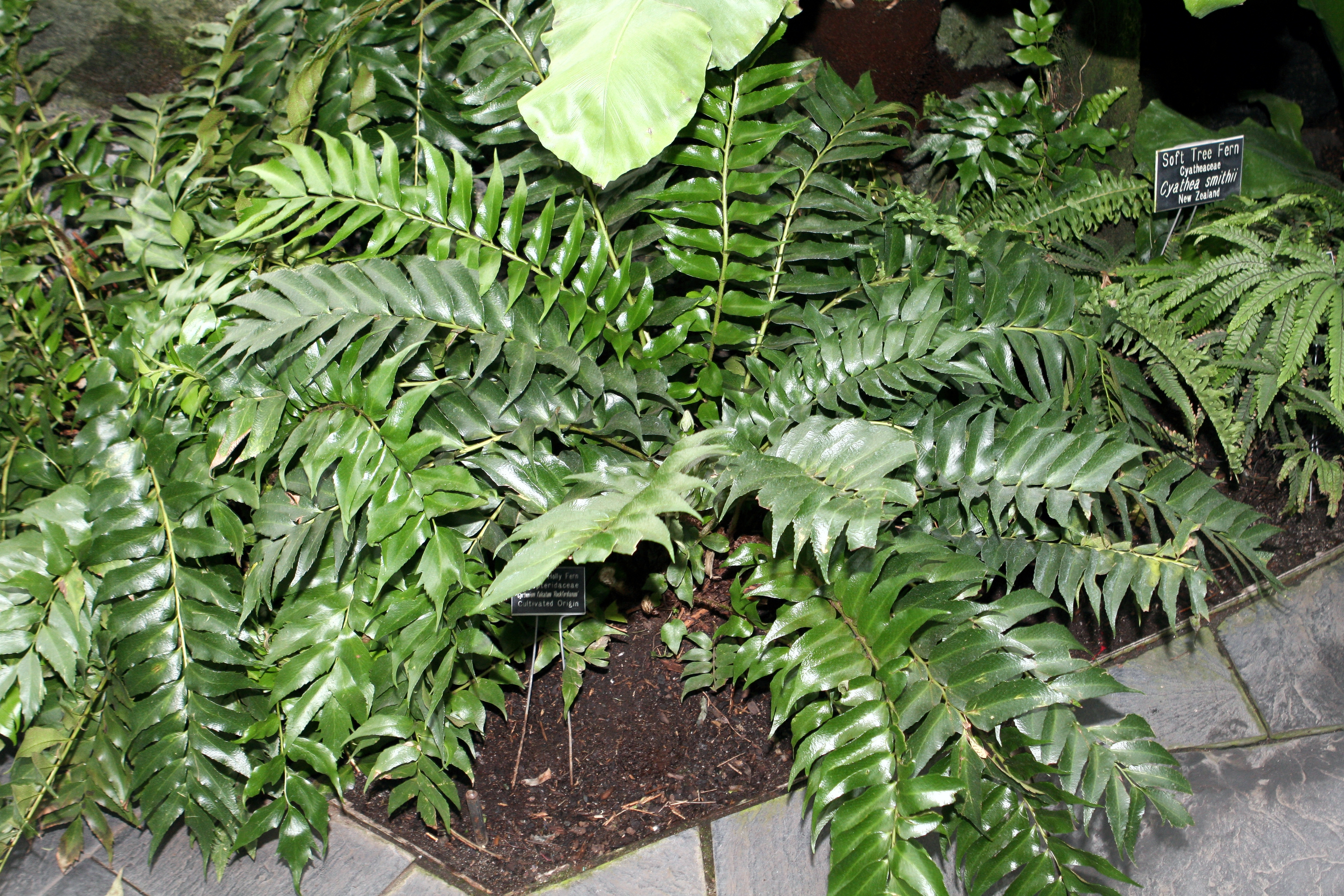
Cyrtomium falcatum 'Rochfordianum'
