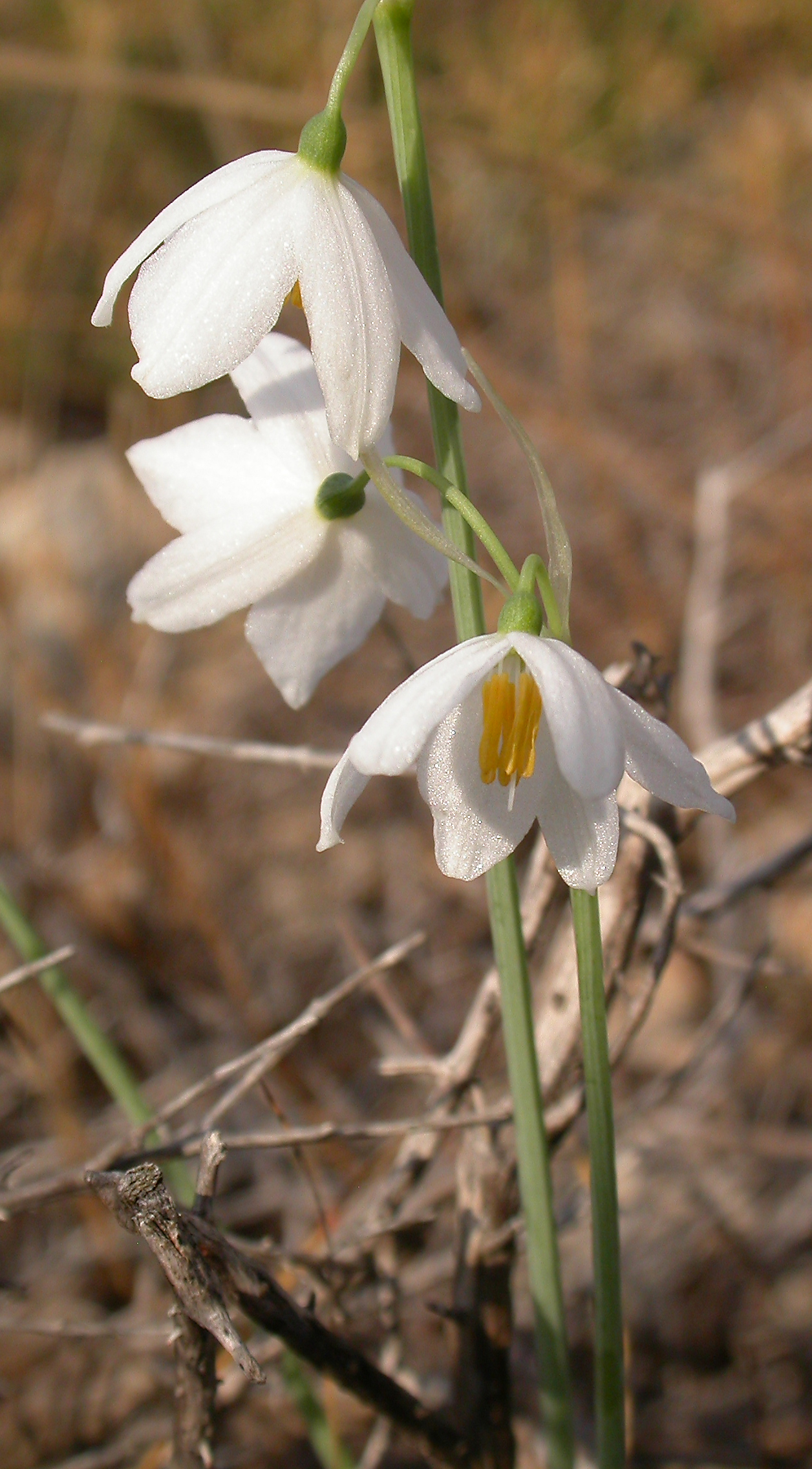

Scientific classification
- Kingdom: Plantae
- Clade: Tracheophytes
- Clade: Angiosperms
- Clade: Monocots
- Order: Asparagales
- Family: Amaryllidaceae
- Subfamily: Amaryllidoideae
- Genus: Acis
- Species: A. ionica

Binomial name
- Acis ionica Bareka, Kamari & Phitos

Synonyms
- Leucojum ionicum Kit Tan, Mullaj, Sfikas & Strid; Acis orientalis Strid (nom. superfl.)

= Acis ionica =

Species of flowering plant in the amaryllis family

Acis ionica is a species of flowering plant in the family Amaryllidaceae, native from south-western Albania to western Greece. It was initially confused with what is now Acis valentina, a species found in Spain near Valencia.

== Description ==
Acis ionica is a bulbous plant with narrow leaves, 12–22 cm (4.7–8.7 in) long but only 2–3 mm wide. The leaves appear after flowering, which is in the autumn. The flowering stalk (scape) is usually 8–20 cm (3.1–7.9 in) tall, with an inflorescence composed of two to four flowers, occasionally only one or as many as six. The inflorescence is subtended by two spathes, usually extending to below the level of the highest flower. Each flower opens widely and is borne on a stem (pedicel) about 16–28 mm long. The six tepals are white, generally 9–13 mm long. The outer three tepals have pointed tips. The pedicel lengthens after flowering. The black seeds are about 3 mm long.

== Taxonomy ==
Acis species were at one time placed in the genus Leucojum. What is now considered to be Acis ionica was initially confused with Leucojum valentinum (Acis valentina), a species found in Spain near Valencia. Doubts over this identification began around 1990, and both morphological and molecular evidence began to suggest that it was a distinct species. It was first described as a separate species in 2004 as Leucojum ionicum. Separately, and on the basis of a different type, Acis ionica was described in 2006 by Pepy Bareka, Georgia Kamari and Dimitrios Phitos. In 2019, Arne Strid treated both taxa as the same species based on the very limited differences between their characters. In order to transfer the first published name, Leucojum ionicum, to the genus Acis, Strid considered that it was necessary to use a replacement name (nomen novum) to avoid creating a homonym of the already published Acis ionica. For this purpose, Strid published the name Acis orientalis. A different view is adopted by the World Checklist of Selected Plant Families, namely that the next published name, Acis ionica, should be used, making Strid's replacement name superfluous and hence illegitimate. (Note: Article 11.4 of the International Code of Nomenclature for algae, fungi, and plants governs the choice of epithets in binomial names. When the final epithet of the earliest legitimate name cannot be used, the final epithet of the next earliest legitimate name is to be used instead. The name cannot be "Acis ionica (Kit Tan, Mullaj, Sfikas & Strid) ..." because this would be a homonym of "Acis ionica Bareka, Kamari & Phitos". So the second published name, "Acis ionica Bareka, Kamari & Phitos" is used instead. It is accidental here that the two epithets have the same spelling.)

Although similar in appearance to A. valentina, genetically it is as distinct as any other species of Acis. Compared to A. valentina, it has a thinner scape (flower stalk), broader inner tepals, and its flowers open more widely.

== Distribution and habitat ==
Acis ionica is found in western Greece, on the islands of Zakynthos, Kefalonia and Lefkas, with populations on the nearby mainland of Greece and further north in coastal Albania (close to the city of Vlorë). It is found on calcareous soils, in open, stony or rocky ground and on hillsides, usually not far from the sea and at altitudes below 350 m (1,150 ft).
