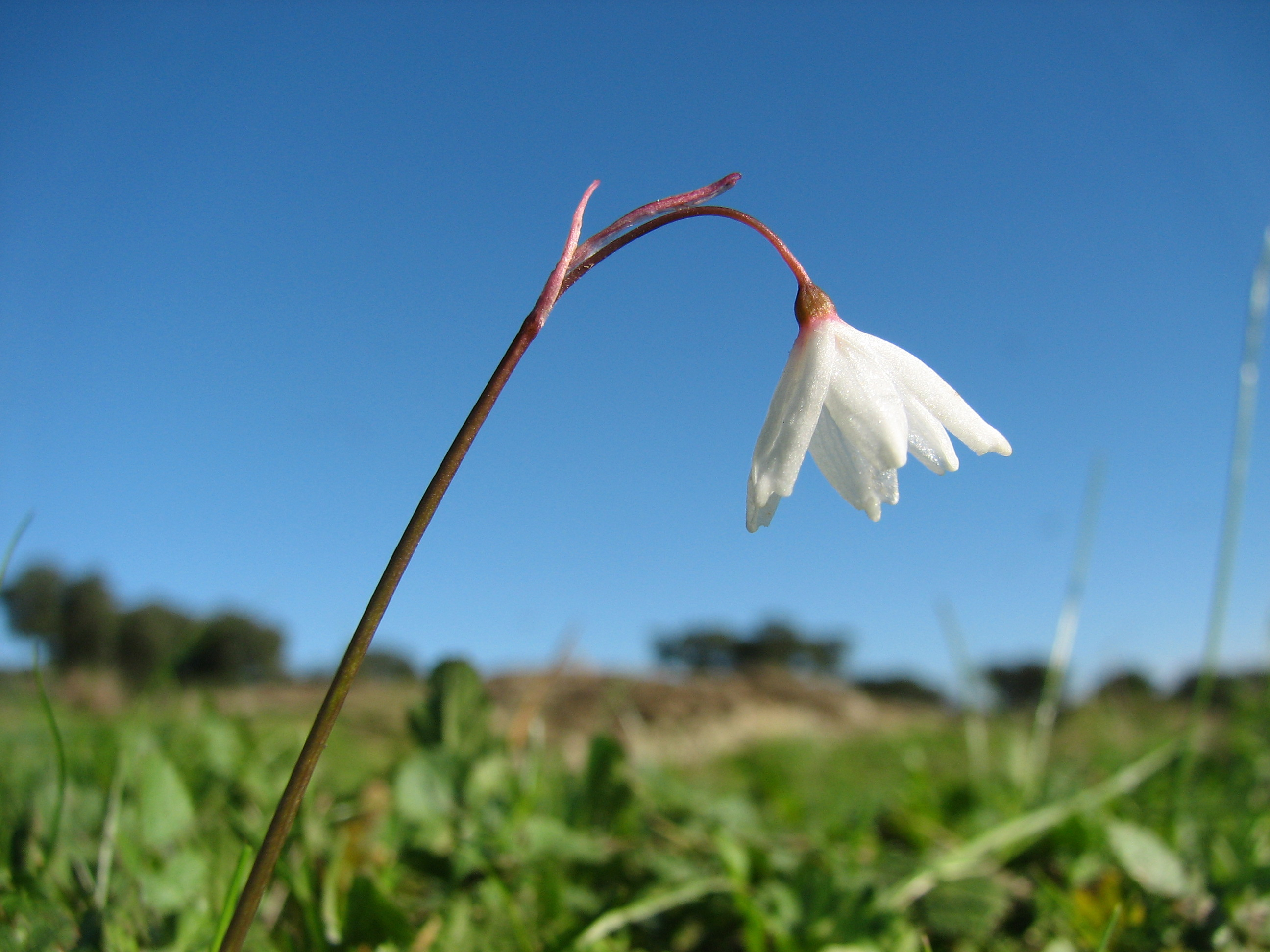
- Flower of Acis autumnalis

Scientific classification
- Kingdom: Plantae
- Clade: Tracheophytes
- Clade: Angiosperms
- Clade: Monocots
- Order: Asparagales
- Family: Amaryllidaceae
- Subfamily: Amaryllidoideae
- Genus: Acis; Salisb.

Species
- See text.

= Acis (plant) =

Genus of flowering plants

Acis is a genus of perennial, herbaceous and bulbous plants in the amaryllis family (Amaryllidaceae, subfamily Amaryllidoideae). The genus consists of nine species distributed in Europe and Northern Africa. Acis was previously included in Leucojum; both genera are known as snowflakes.

== Description ==
Acis species are perennial bulbous plants. The flowers have six equally sized tepals, unlike the related genus Galanthus (snowdrops) in which the inner three tepals are shorter than the outer three. The tepals are unmarked, differing in this respect from Leucojum. Most species have white tepals, although those of Acis rosea are pale pink. Acis species are relatively short, up to 15 cm (6 in) in Acis autumnalis and 45 cm (18 in) in Acis tingitana. The leaves are narrow; very narrow (filiform) in Acis trichophylla. The flower stalks (scapes) are solid.

== Taxonomy ==
Acis was first differentiated from the genus Leucojum by Richard Anthony Salisbury in The Paradisus Londinensis in 1807. In an earlier part of this work, he had used the name Leucojum autumnale for the plant illustrated in plate 21, but when discussing Leucojum pulchellum, illustrated in plate 74, Salisbury noted the differences between the two species and considered them sufficient to put Leucojum autumnale into a new genus, Acis. (However, he did not actually use the name Acis autumnalis, which was published in 1829 by Robert Sweet.) Salisbury did not explain the origin of the name Acis beyond describing it as a "poetic title". It may refer to the myth of Acis and Galatea.

Most later botanists did not accept the distinction between Leucojum and Acis. Acis was reinstated in 2004, after it was determined on morphological and molecular grounds that the broadly defined genus Leucojum was paraphyletic, with Acis and a more narrowly defined Leucojum being related as shown the following cladogram.

- Galantheae
  - Acis
  - - Leucojum s.s.
    - Galanthus

A possible relationship among the species of the genus Acis is shown in the following cladogram. (In the study, Acis ionica was treated as "Acis valentina from Greece").

- - - - - Acis fabrei
        - Acis nicaeensis
      - - Acis valentina
        - Acis ionica
    - - Acis longifolia
      - Acis rosea
  - - Acis autumnale
    - - Acis tingitana
      - Acis trichophylla

=== Species ===
As of 25 February 2020, the World Checklist of Selected Plant Families accepted nine species, most formerly placed in Leucojum.

- Acis autumnalis (L.) Sweet – W. & W. Central Mediterranean
- Acis fabrei (Quézel & Girerd) Lledó – S.E. France (around Mont Ventoux and River Nesque)
- Acis longifolia J.Gay ex M.Roem. – Corsica
- Acis nicaeensis (Ardoino) Lledó, A.P.Davis & M.B.Crespo – S.E. France (from Nice eastwards)
- Acis ionica Bareka, Kamari & Phitos, syns. Leucojum ionicum Kit Tan, Mullaj, Sfikas & Strid, Acis orientalis Strid – SW. Albania to W. Greece
- Acis rosea (F.Martin bis) Sweet – Corsica, Sardinia
- Acis tingitana (Baker) Lledó, A.P.Davis & M.B.Crespo – Morocco
- Acis trichophylla G.Don – Central & S. Portugal, S. Central & S.W. Spain, Morocco
- Acis valentina (Pau) Lledó, A.P.Davis & M.B.Crespo – E. Spain (N. of Valencia)
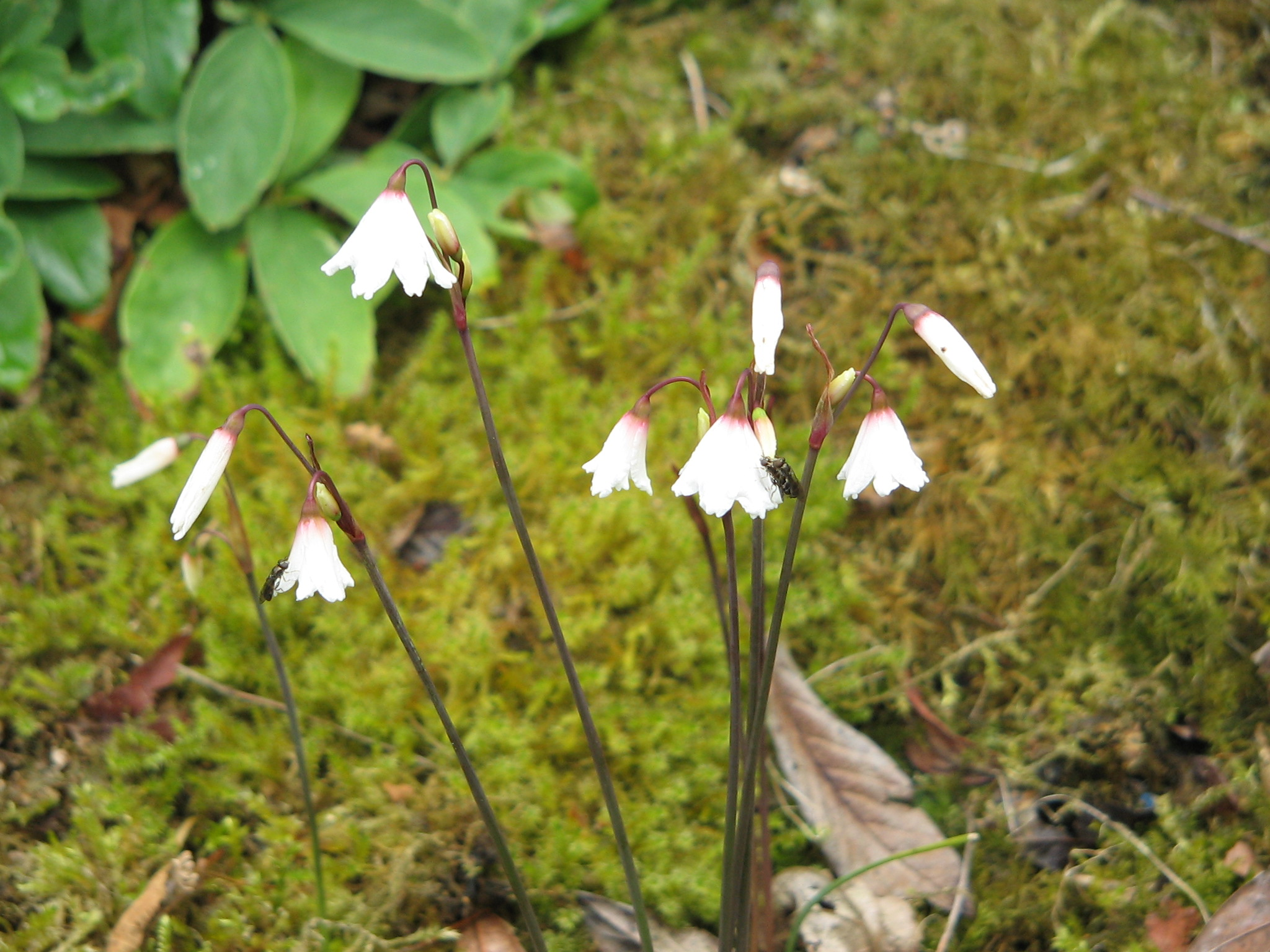
Acis autumnalis

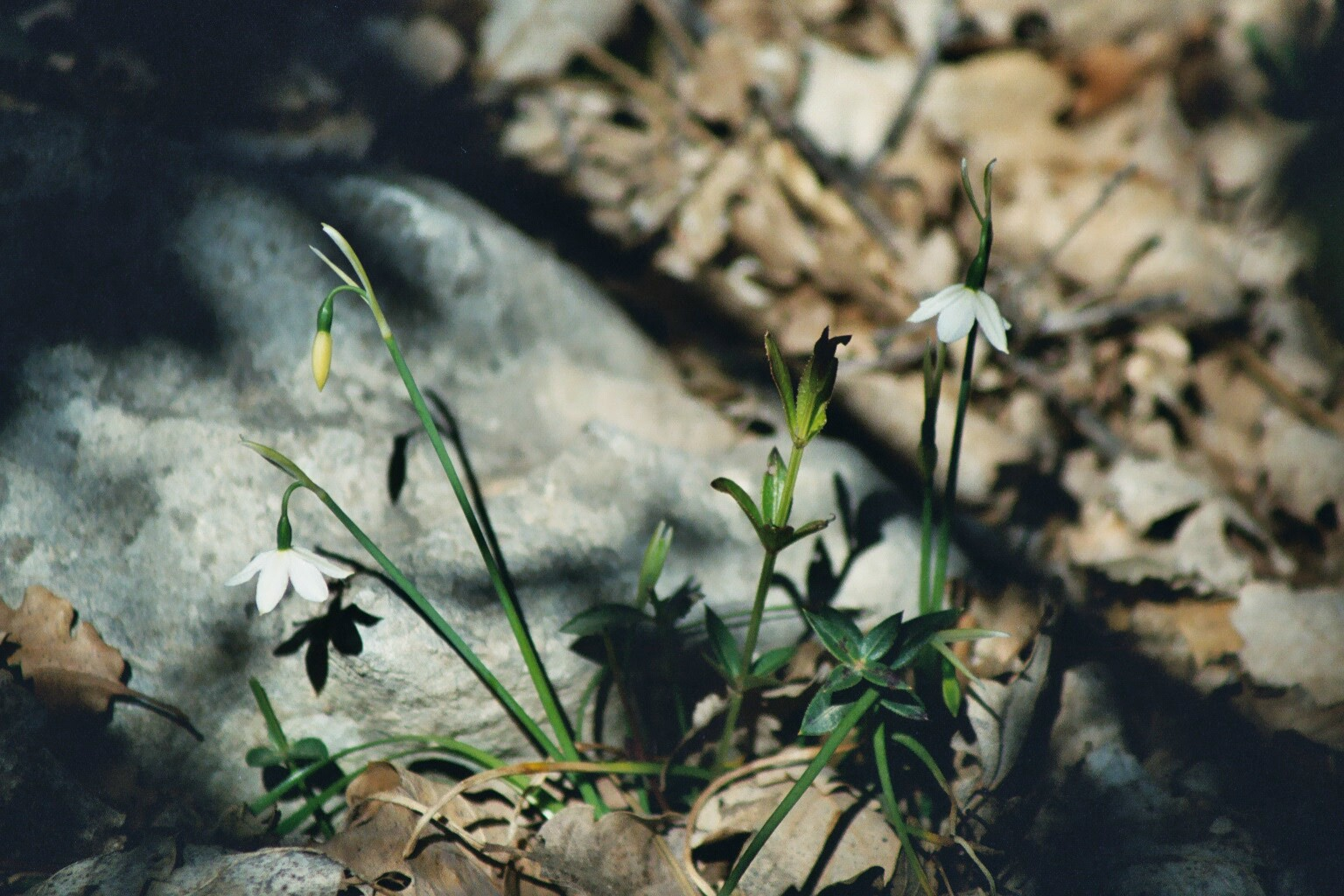
Acis fabrei

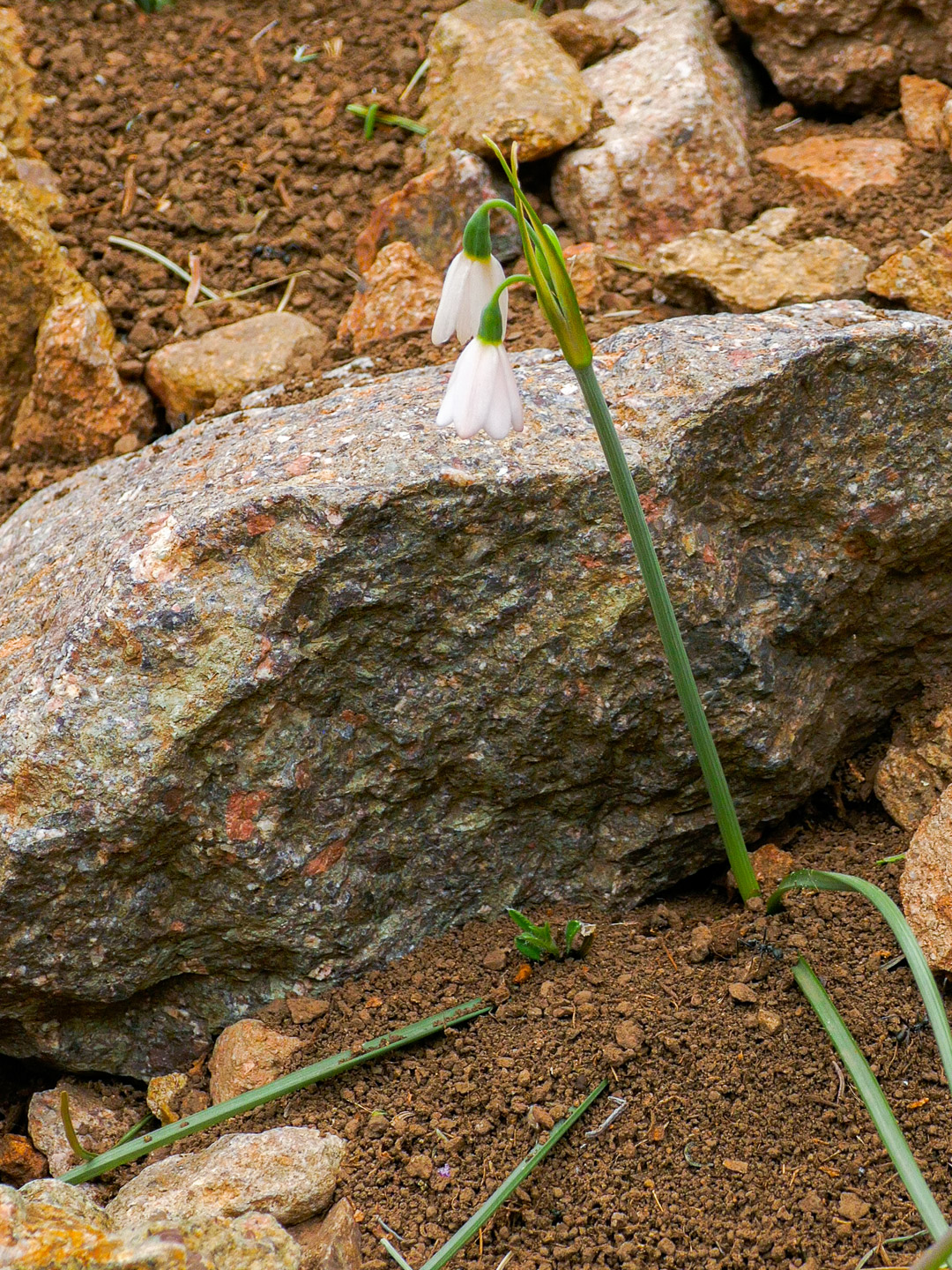
Acis longifolia

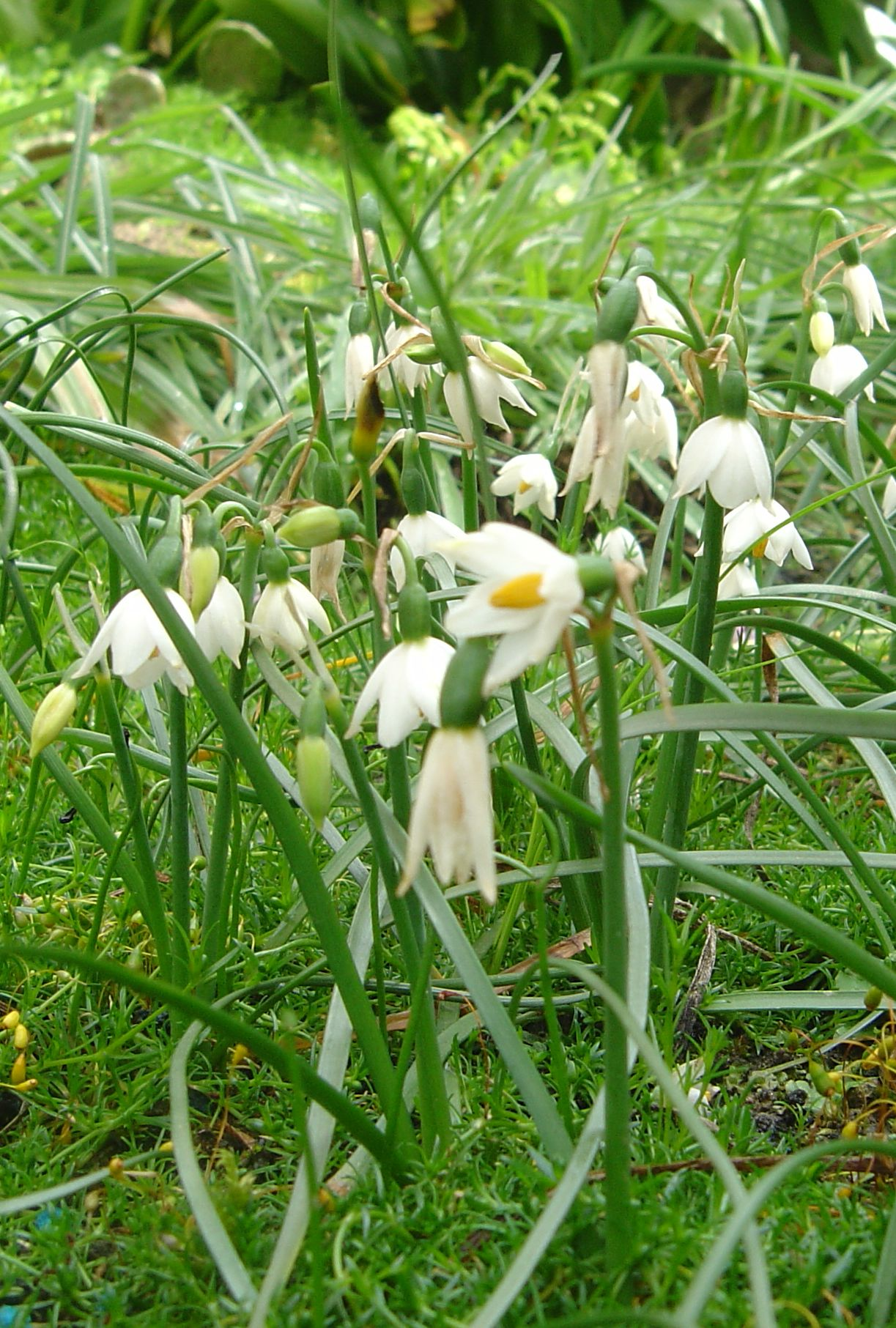
Acis nicaeensis

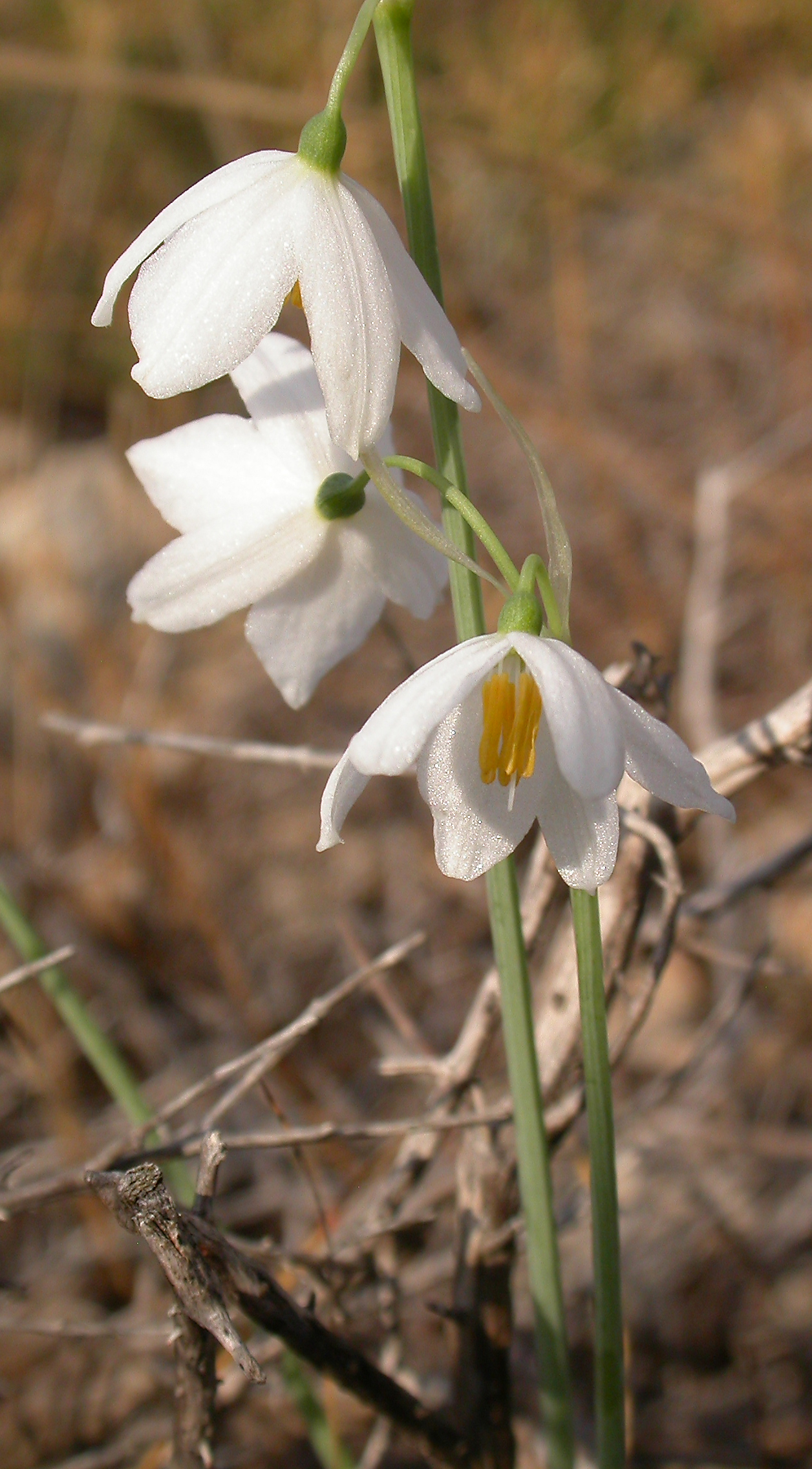
Acis ionica

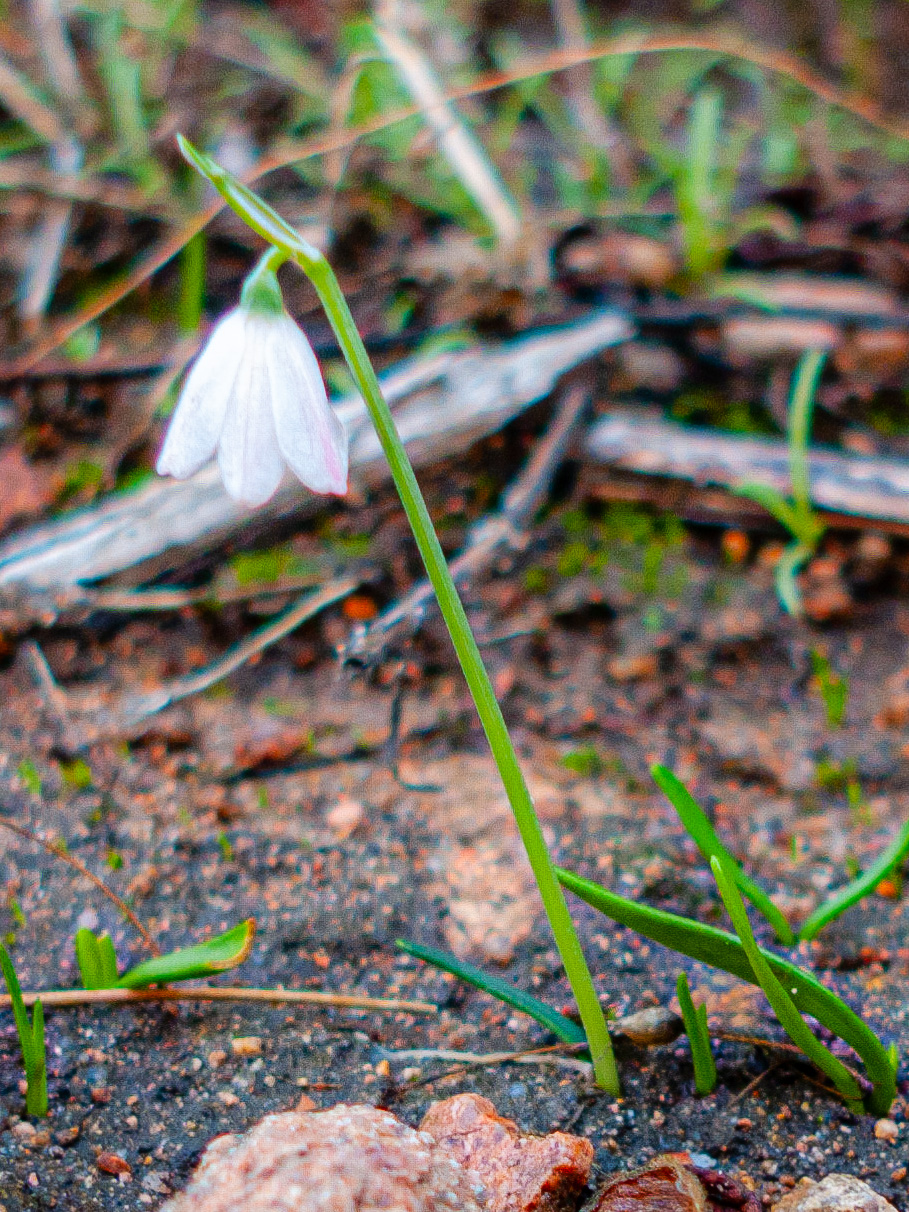
Acis rosea

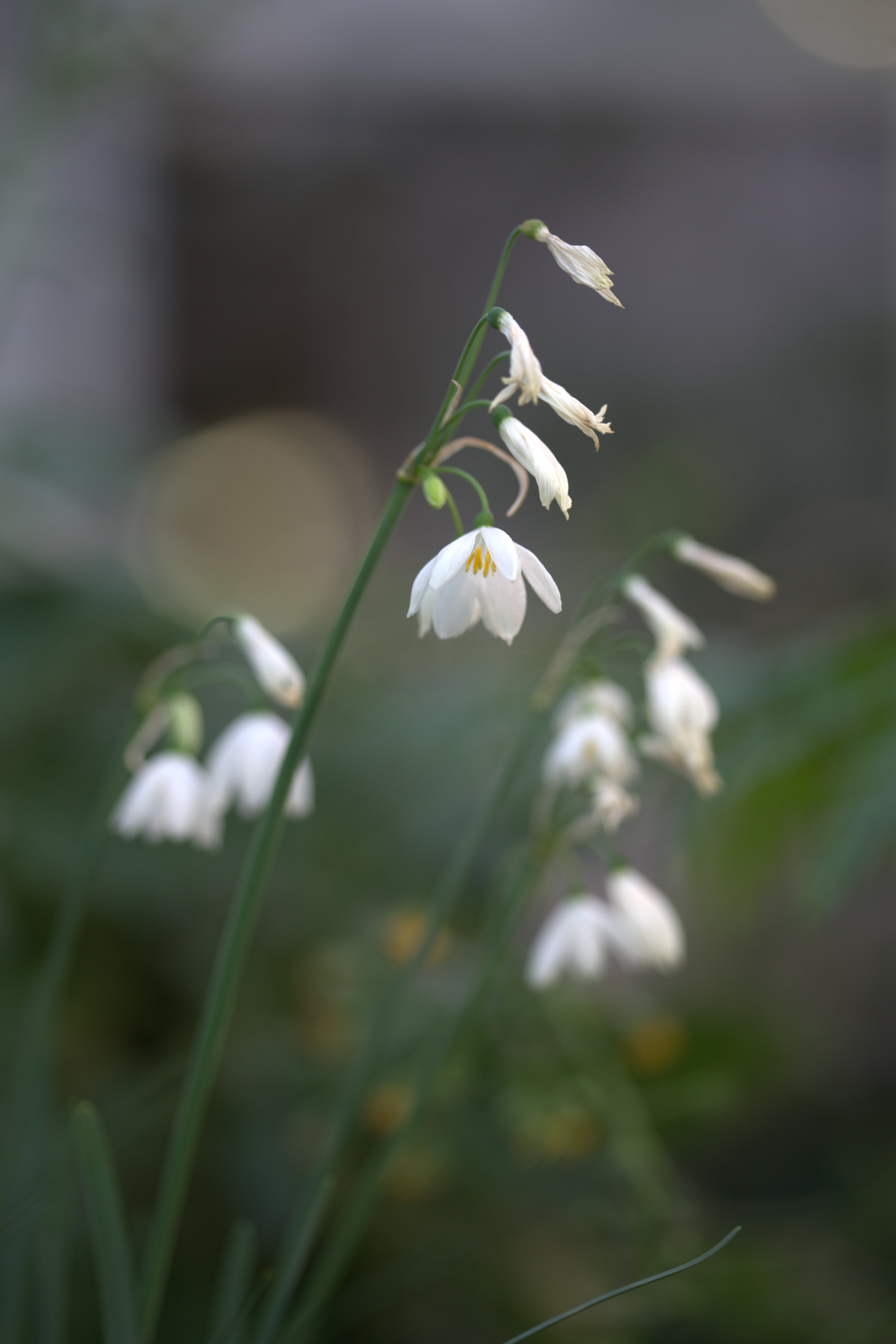
Acis tingitana

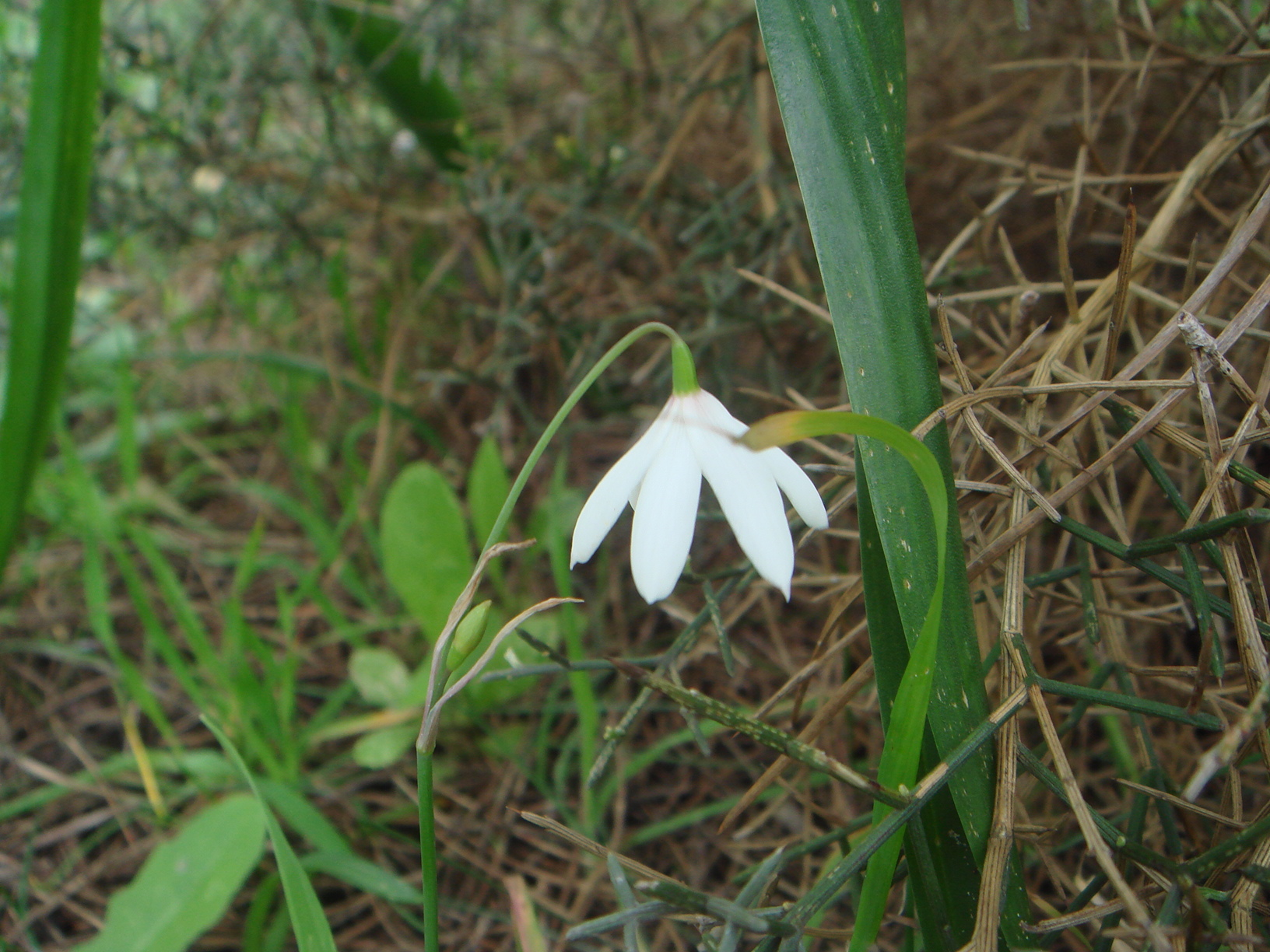
Acis trichophylla

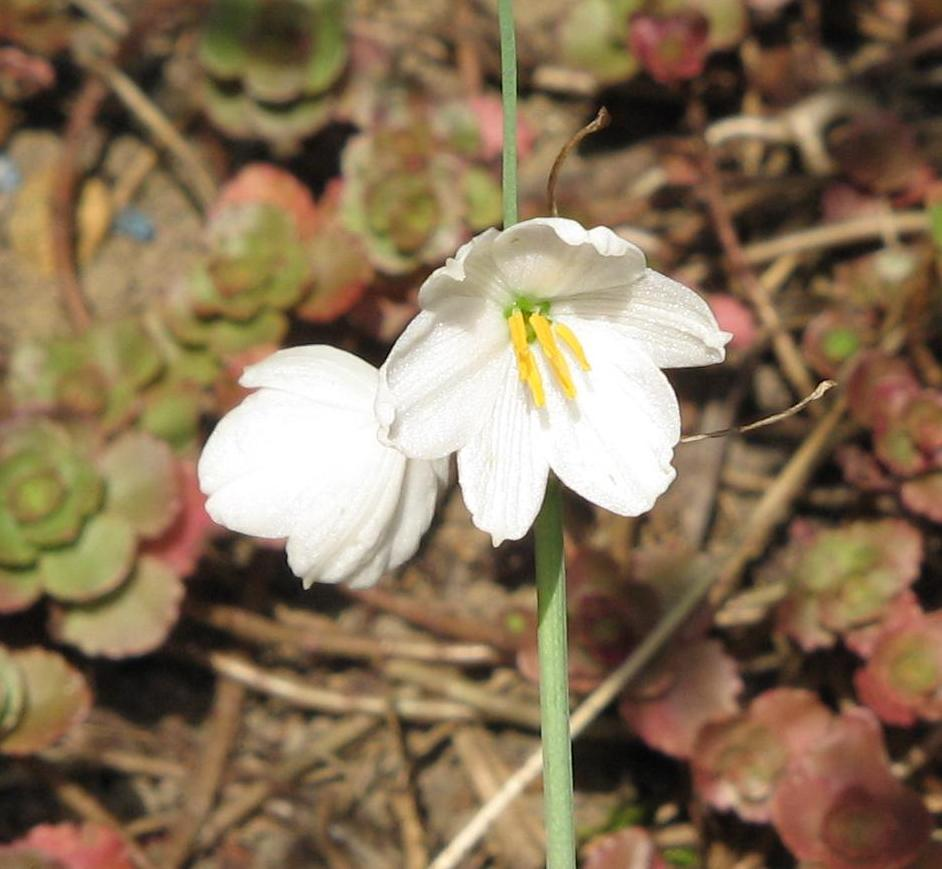
Acis valentina

== Cultivation ==
The species Acis autumnalis has gained the Royal Horticultural Society's Award of Garden Merit.
