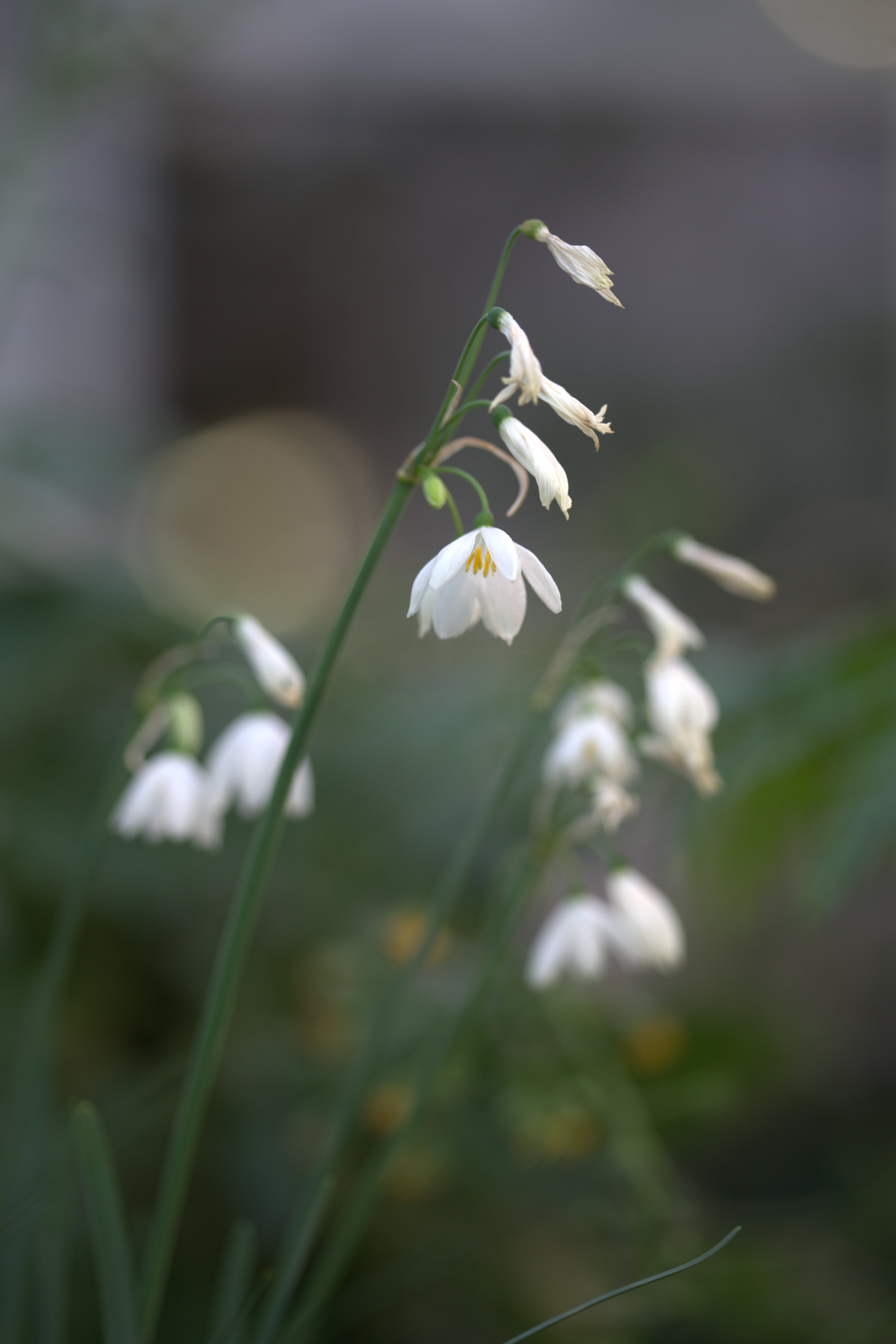
- In cultivation in Gothenburg Botanical Garden

Scientific classification
- Kingdom: Plantae
- Clade: Tracheophytes
- Clade: Angiosperms
- Clade: Monocots
- Order: Asparagales
- Family: Amaryllidaceae
- Subfamily: Amaryllidoideae
- Genus: Acis
- Species: A. tingitana

Binomial name
- Acis tingitana (Baker) Lledó, A.P.Davis & M.B.Crespo

Synonyms
- Leucojum tingitanum Baker; Leucojum fontianum Maire

= Acis tingitana =

Species of flowering plant in the amaryllis family

Acis tingitana is a species of flowering plant in the family Amaryllidaceae, native to northern Morocco. Rare in cultivation, it is not fully frost-hardy.

== Description ==
Acis tingitana is a bulbous flowering plant. Forms described under the synonym Leucojum fontianum have four to five leaves per bulb, each 6–8 mm wide, produced with the flowers in spring. The flowering stems are about 10–12 cm (3.9–4.7 in) tall, and bear up to four flowers, with six 1–1.5 cm-long tepals, each with a sharply pointed tip. Forms described under the synonym Leucojum tingitanum are less robust, with narrower leaves.

== Taxonomy ==
Acis tingitana was first described in 1878 by John Gilbert Baker, as Leucojum tingitanum. The specific epithet tingitanus refers to Tangier, in Morocco. In 1934, René Maire described Leucojum fontianum. Although in 1987 Brian Mathew regarded the two species as distinct, in 1992, he synonymized them. In 2004, Leucojum tingitanum was transferred to the genus Acis, along with other species of Leucojum, on the basis of a molecular phylogenetic study.

== Distribution and habitat ==
Acis tingitana is native to north Morocco, particularly around Tangier. It occurs below about 1,500 m (4,900 ft). One collection came from wet ground around a stream.

== Cultivation ==
Rare in cultivation, Acis tingitana is not fully frost-hardy, and requires protection.
