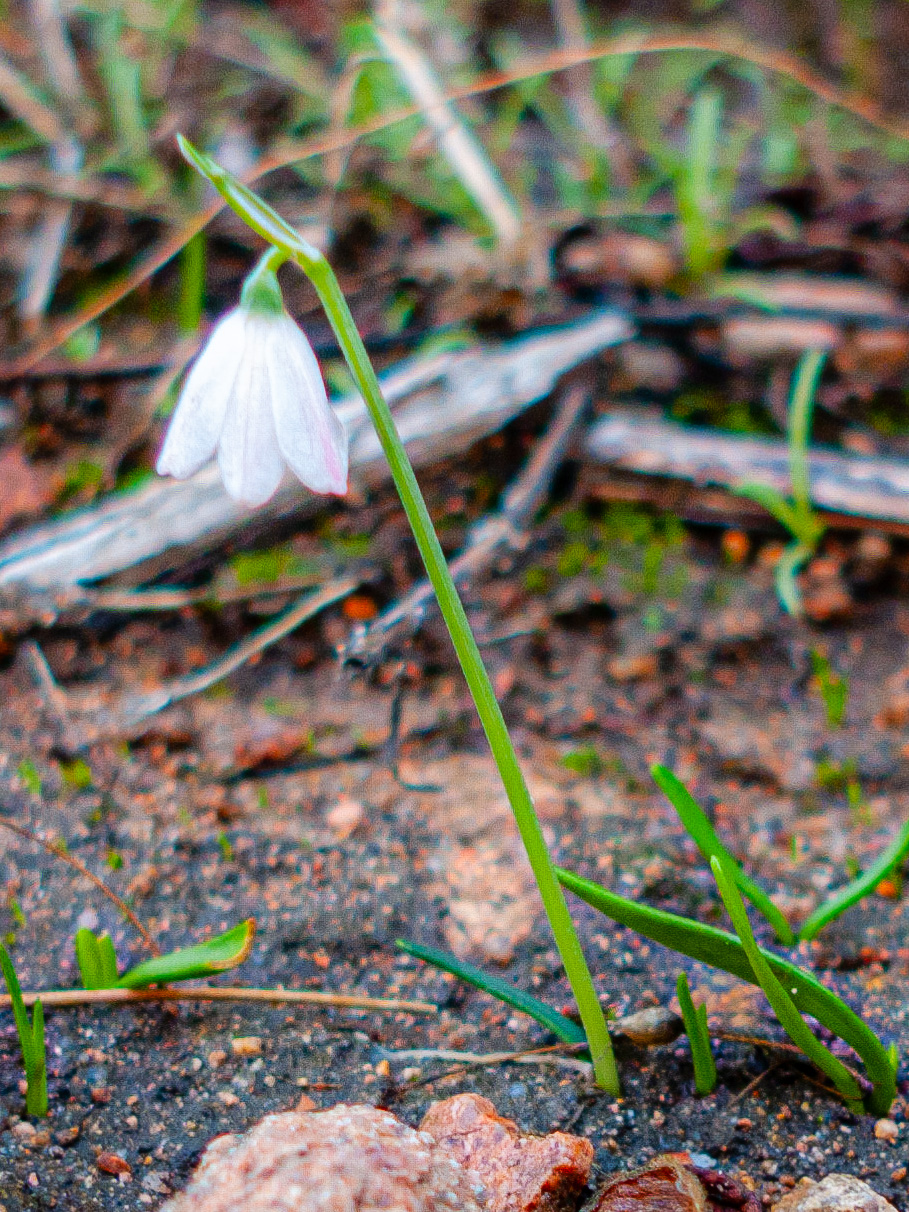

Scientific classification
- Kingdom: Plantae
- Clade: Tracheophytes
- Clade: Angiosperms
- Clade: Monocots
- Order: Asparagales
- Family: Amaryllidaceae
- Subfamily: Amaryllidoideae
- Genus: Acis
- Species: A. rosea

Binomial name
- Acis rosea (F.Martin bis) Sweet

Synonyms
- Leucojum roseum F.Martin bis; Galanthus autumnalis All.; Leucojum trichophyllum var. uniflorum Redouté

= Acis rosea =

Species of flowering plant in the amaryllis family

Acis rosea, known as the rose snowflake, is a species of flowering plant in the family Amaryllidaceae, native to Corsica and Sardinia. Unlike most members of the genus Acis, it has pink rather than white flowers. It is grown as an ornamental plant but requires protection from frost.

== Description ==
Acis rosea is a small bulbous perennial, growing up to 12 cm (4.7 in) tall. The grey-green leaves are narrow and usually appear after the flowers. Flowering occurs in autumn. The flowers are small, 5–9 mm long, and have pink tepals – most other species of Acis have white tepals. The pedicels (flower stalks) are short, 1–5 mm long. There are two spathes.

== Taxonomy ==
Acis rosea was first described in 1804 by F. Martin, as Leucojum roseum. In 1829, Robert Sweet transferred it to Acis. However, Acis was not accepted by most botanists, who continued to use a broadly circumscribed Leucojum. Acis was reinstated in 2004, after it was determined on morphological and molecular grounds that the broadly defined genus Leucojum was paraphyletic.

== Distribution and habitat ==
Acis rosea is native to the two western Mediterranean islands of Corsica and Sardinia. It is found in rocky ground, dry pastures and sandy places.

== Cultivation ==
Acis rosea is cultivated as an ornamental bulb. As it is not frost-hardy, it is usually grown in a bulb frame or alpine house.
