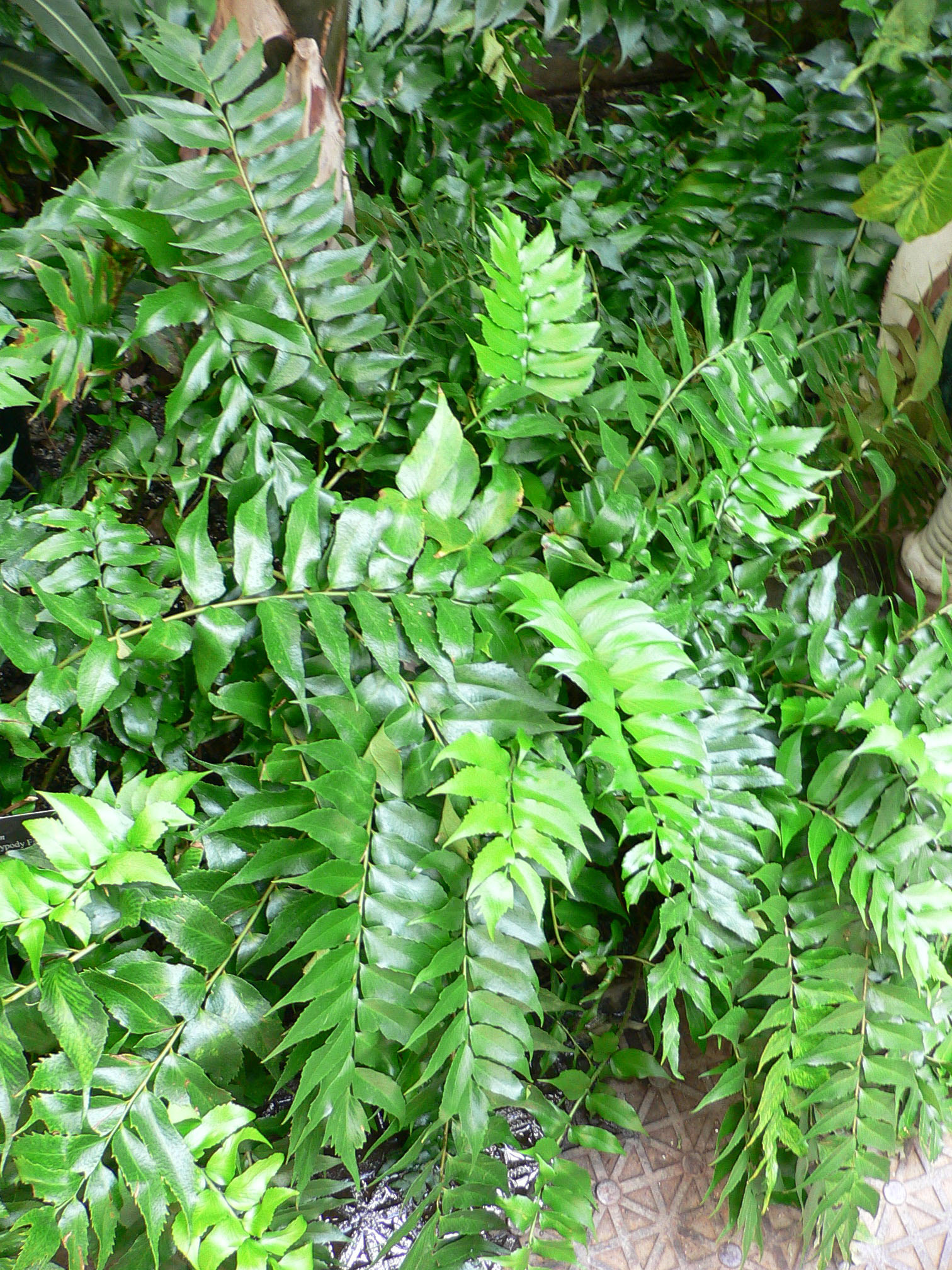
- Cyrtomium falcatum

Scientific classification
- Kingdom: Plantae
- Clade: Tracheophytes
- Division: Polypodiophyta
- Class: Polypodiopsida
- Order: Polypodiales
- Suborder: Polypodiineae
- Family: Dryopteridaceae
- Subfamily: Dryopteridoideae
- Genus: Cyrtomium; C.Presl

Species
- See text.

= Cyrtomium =

Genus of ferns

Cyrtomium is a genus of about 35 species of ferns in the family Dryopteridaceae, subfamily Dryopteridoideae, according to the Pteridophyte Phylogeny Group classification of 2016 (PPG I). Species are native to Asia, Africa (including Madagascar), and the Pacific Ocean islands (Hawaii). It is very closely related to the genus Polystichum, with 2016 research suggesting it should be included in a clade sister to Polystichum s.s.

== Species ==
As of November 2026, the Checklist of Ferns and Lycophytes of the World accepted the following 40 species in Cyrtomium. World Flora Online accepted 41 species (including C. pusillum, placed by other checklists in Polystichum, and duplicating C. taiwanianum as C. taiwanense), while Plants of the World Online accepted 39 species.

- Cyrtomium adenotrichum You Nong & R.H.Jiang
- Cyrtomium aequibasis (C.Chr.) Ching
- Cyrtomium anomophyllum (Zenker) Fraser-Jenk.
- Cyrtomium atropunctatum Kurata
- Cyrtomium calcis Liang Zhang, N.T.Lu & Li Bing Zhang
- Cyrtomium caryotideum (Wall. ex Hook. & Grev.) C.Presl
- Cyrtomium chingianum P.S.Wang
- Cyrtomium confertifolium Ching & K.H.Shing
- Cyrtomium conforme Ching
- Cyrtomium devexiscapulae (Koidz.) Ching
- Cyrtomium elongatum S.K.Wu & P.K.Lôc
- Cyrtomium falcatum (L.f.) C.Presl (Japanese holly fern or holly fern) - type species
- Cyrtomium fortunei J.Sm.
- Cyrtomium grossum Christ
- Cyrtomium guizhouense H.S.Kung & P.S.Wang
- Cyrtomium hemionitis Christ
- Cyrtomium lacrimipinnum Yoneoka, T.Fujiw., V.S.Dang & Tagane (not yet recognized by WFO or POWO)
- Cyrtomium laetevirens (Hiyama) Nakaike
- Cyrtomium latifalcatum S.K.Wu & Mitsuta
- Cyrtomium lonchitoides (Christ) Christ
- Cyrtomium luctuosum J.P.Roux
- Cyrtomium macrophyllum (Makino) Tagawa
- Cyrtomium membranifolium Ching & K.H.Shing ex H.S.Kung & P.S.Wang
- Cyrtomium micropterum (Kunze) Ching
- Cyrtomium nephrolepioides (Christ) Copel.
- Cyrtomium obliquum Ching & K.H.Shing
- Cyrtomium omeiense China & Shing
- Cyrtomium pachyphyllum (Rosenst.) C.Chr.
- Cyrtomium pseudocaryotideum J.P.Roux
- Cyrtomium remotipinnum Yan Liu & H.J.Wei
- Cyrtomium semifertile J.X.Li & Xiao J.Li
- Cyrtomium serratum Ching & K.H.Shing
- Cyrtomium shingianum H.S.Kung & P.S.Wang
- Cyrtomium simadae (Tagawa) Y.H.Chang
- Cyrtomium sinningense Ching & K.H.Shing
- Cyrtomium taiwanianum Tagawa
- Cyrtomium tsinglingense Ching & K.H.Shing
- Cyrtomium urophyllum Ching
- Cyrtomium yamamotoi Tagawa
- Cyrtomium yunnanense Ching
