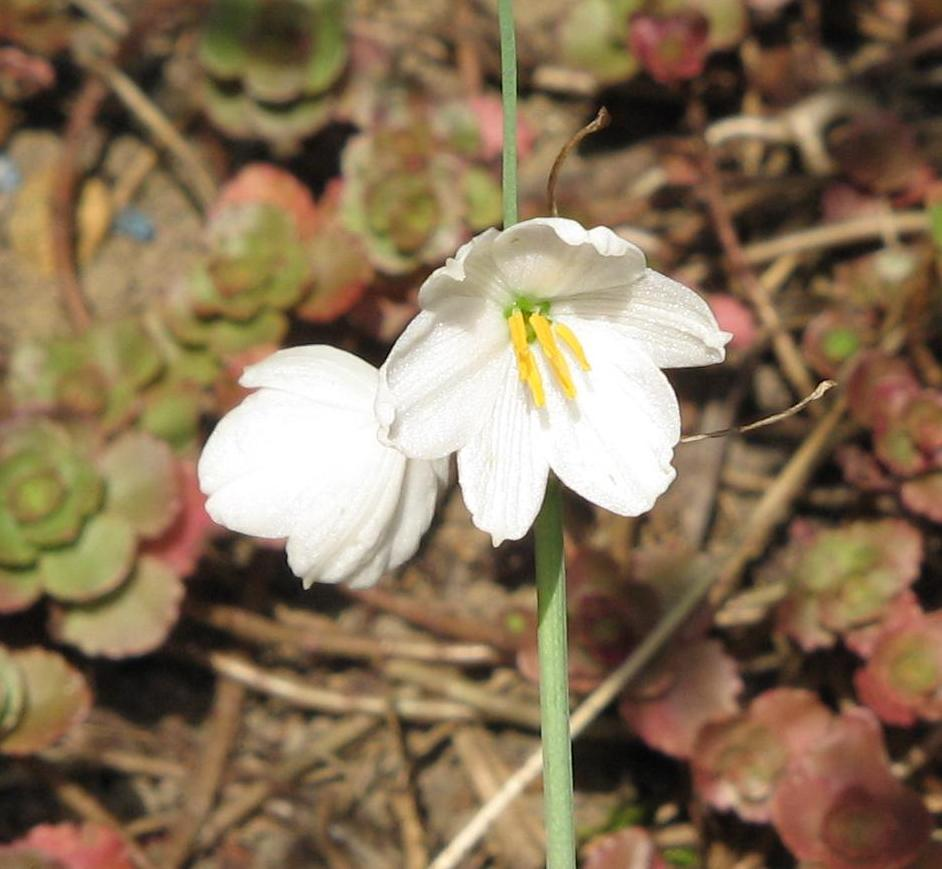

Scientific classification
- Kingdom: Plantae
- Clade: Tracheophytes
- Clade: Angiosperms
- Clade: Monocots
- Order: Asparagales
- Family: Amaryllidaceae
- Subfamily: Amaryllidoideae
- Genus: Acis
- Species: A. valentina

Binomial name
- Acis valentina (Pau) Lledó, A.P.Davis & M.B.Crespo

Synonyms
- Leucojum valentinum Pau

= Acis valentina =

Species of flowering plant in the amaryllis family

Acis valentina is a species of bulbous flowering plant in the family Amaryllidaceae, native to eastern Spain. Its white flowers appear in autumn. It can be grown as an ornamental bulb, but may need protection from hard frost.

== Description ==
Acis valentina is usually no more than 12 cm (4.7 in) tall. It flowers in the autumn, the thread-like leaves appearing after the flowers. Flowers may be solitary or in a group of two or three. The flower has six milky white tepals, 8–14 mm long, each with a sharp point at the apex (at least in the outer three). Acis valentina resembles the spring-flowering Acis nicaeense in several ways, including possessing a six-lobed disc at the base of the ovary.

== Taxonomy ==
Acis valentina was first described in 1914 by Carlos Pau, as Leucojum valentinum. It was transferred to the genus Acis, along with other species of Leucojum, in 2004. Its nearest relative appears to be Acis ionica, found in the Balkans.

== Distribution and habitat ==
The native distribution of Acis valentina is eastern Spain, north of Valencia. It has also been recorded as occurring in the Ionian Islands of Greece; however these plants are now assigned to Acis ionica. It is found in rocky pastures.

== Cultivation ==
Acis valentina is cultivated as an autumn-flowering bulb, but may need protection, such as in an alpine house.
