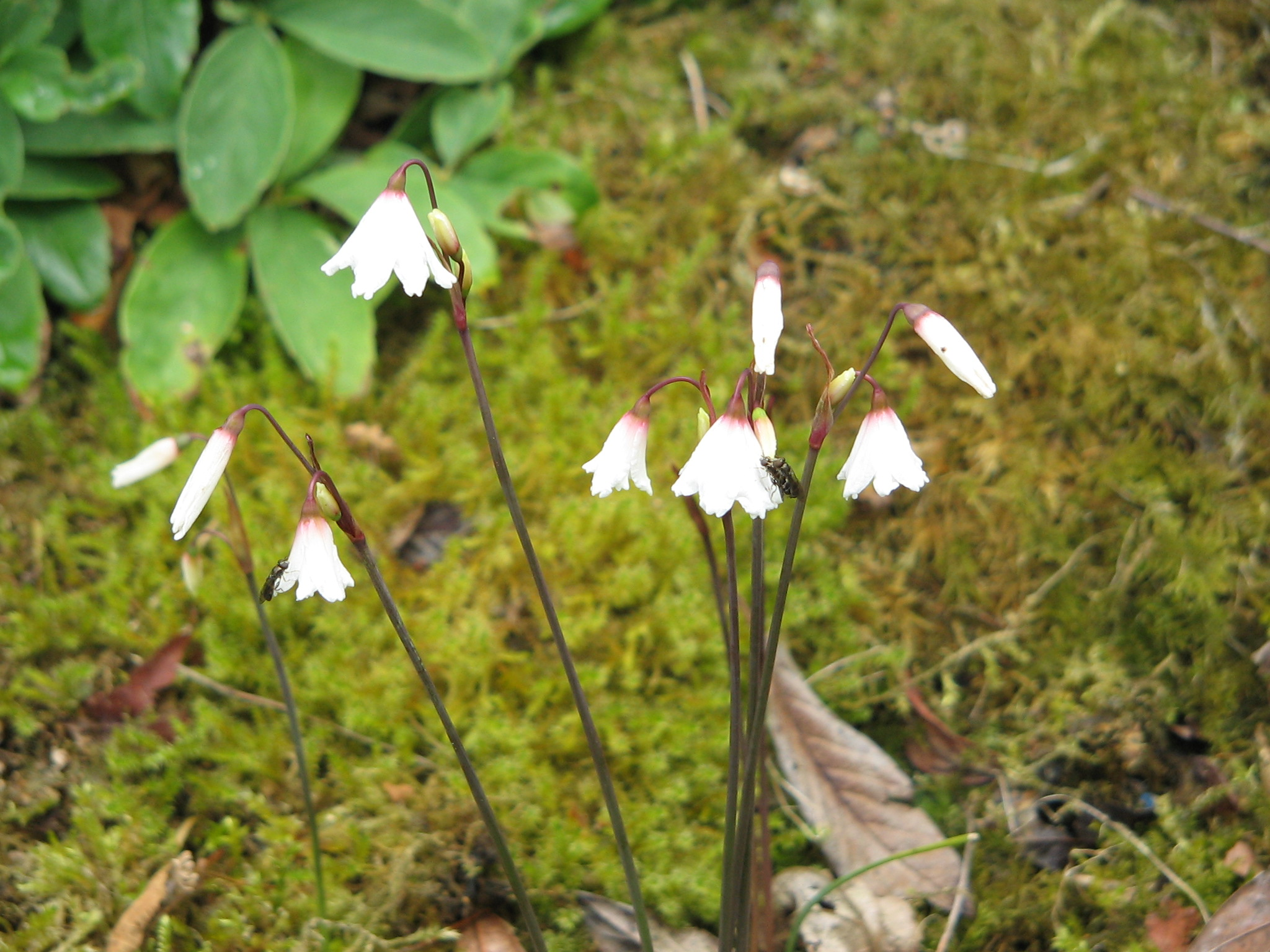

Scientific classification
- Kingdom: Plantae
- Clade: Tracheophytes
- Clade: Angiosperms
- Clade: Monocots
- Order: Asparagales
- Family: Amaryllidaceae
- Subfamily: Amaryllidoideae
- Genus: Acis
- Species: A. autumnalis

Binomial name
- Acis autumnalis (L.) Sweet

Synonyms
- Leucojum autumnale L.

= Acis autumnalis =

Species of flowering plant in the amaryllis family

Acis autumnalis, the autumn snowflake, is a species of flowering plant in the family Amaryllidaceae. A short bulbous perennial, it is found on the western shores of the Mediterranean, from Portugal, Spain and Morocco to Sicily and Tunisia.

== Description ==
Acis autumnalis grows to about 10–15 cm (4–6 in) tall. Its leaves are narrow, often seeming to form tufts, and usually only appear after the flowers. A. autumnalis flowers in late summer to autumn, with one to four flowers per stalk, each carried on a long, thin pedicel. The white tepals are 9–14 mm long, pinkish at the base, less commonly all pink. The outer three tepals are toothed. There is normally only one spathe at the base of the flowers.

== Taxonomy ==
Acis autumnalis was first described by Carl Linnaeus in 1753, as Leucojum autumnale. Richard Anthony Salisbury in 1807 in The Paradisus Londinensis was the first to suggest putting Leucojum autumnale in a new genus, Acis, although he did not actually use the name Acis autumnale, which was first published in 1829 by Robert Sweet. Most later botanists did not accept the distinction between Leucojum and Acis. The genus, and with it Acis autumnalis, was reinstated in 2004, after it was determined on morphological and molecular grounds that, when broadly defined, Leucojum is paraphyletic.

The species has been divided into a number of varieties, differing in minor characters. For example, A. autumnalis var. diphyllum from North Africa has two spathes. The World Checklist of Selected Plant Families regards all the varieties as part of a single species.

== Distribution and habitat ==
Acis autumnalis is found on both sides of the western Mediterranean. In Europe, it is native to Portugal, Spain (including the Balearic Islands), Sardinia and Sicily. In north Africa, it is native to Morocco, Algeria and Tunisia. It occurs in rocky places and stony hillsides.

== Cultivation ==
Acis autumnalis is grown as an ornamental plant. It is recommended for light soils in sheltered positions in full sun. Some forms in cultivation increase rapidly from seeds, others from bulb division. The species has gained the Royal Horticultural Society's Award of Garden Merit.

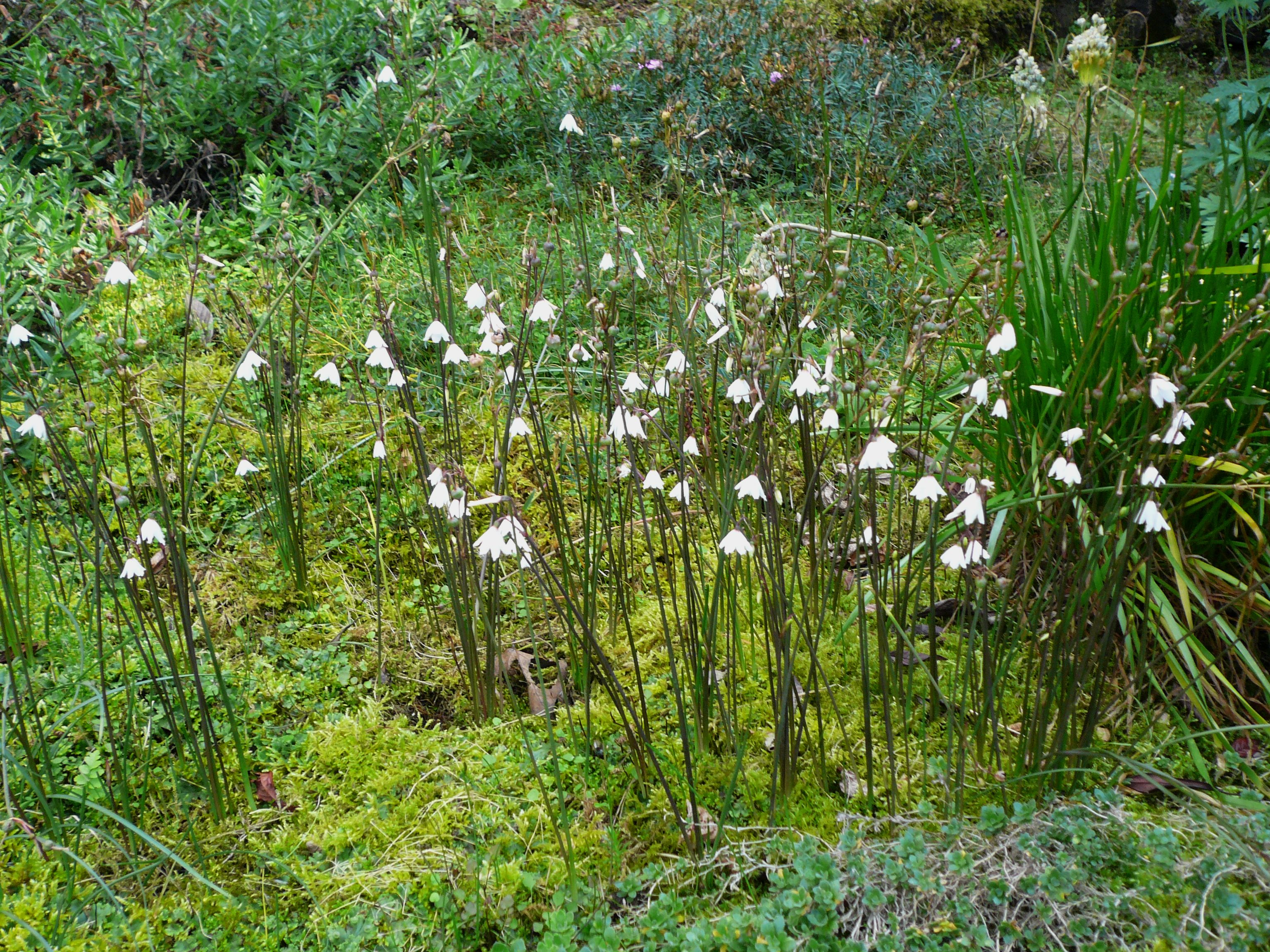
Growth habit

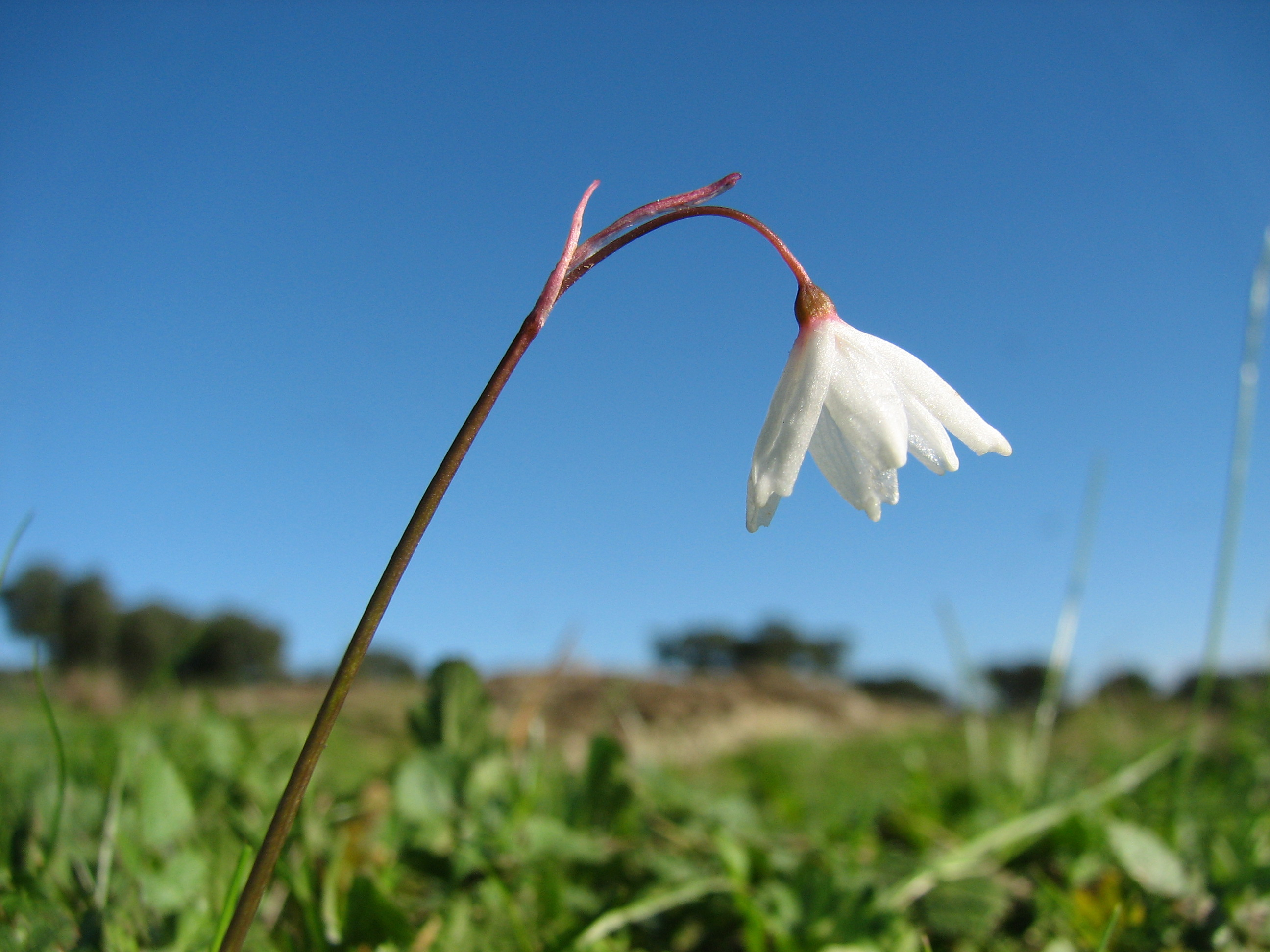
Flower

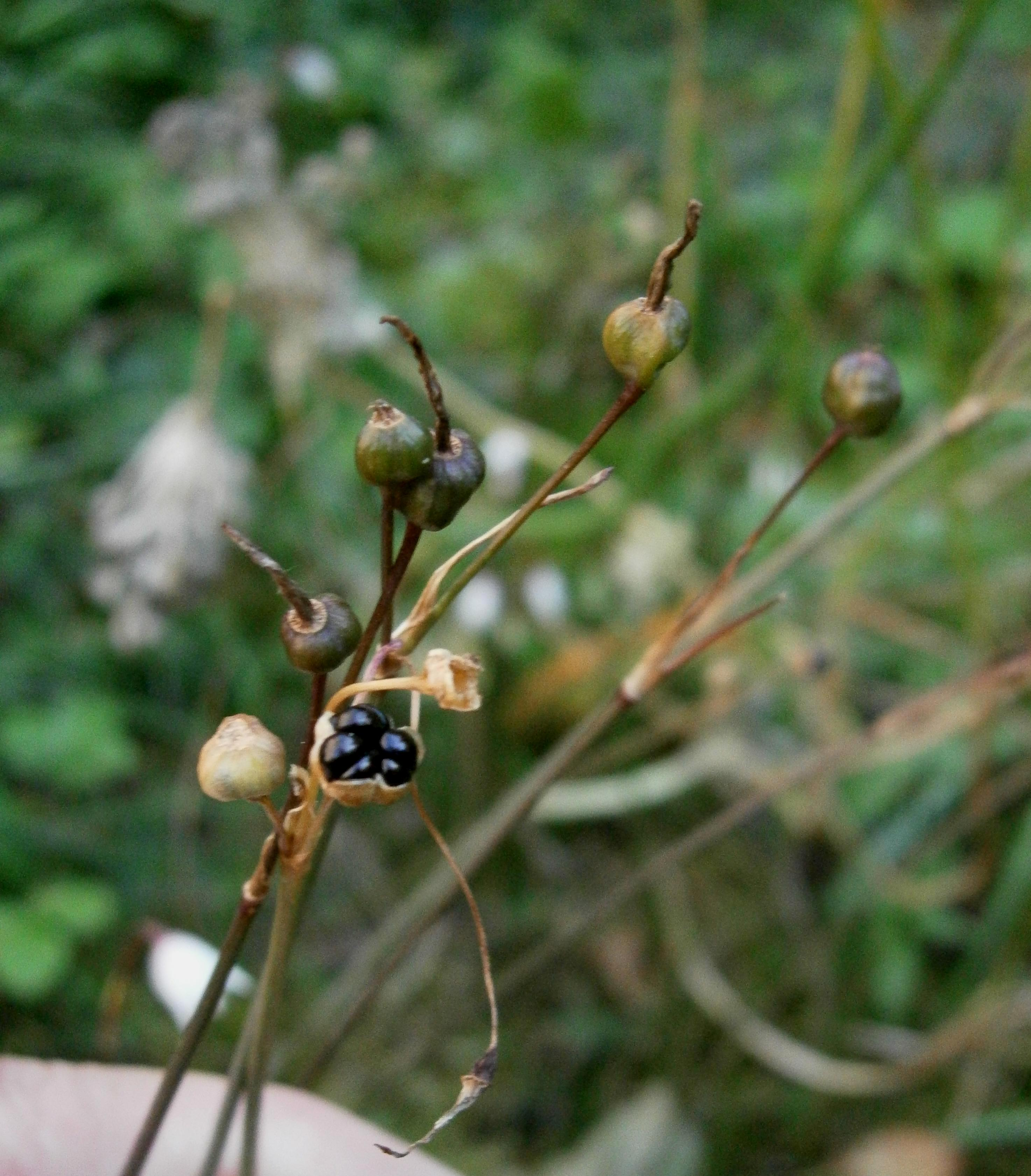
Fruit and seed
