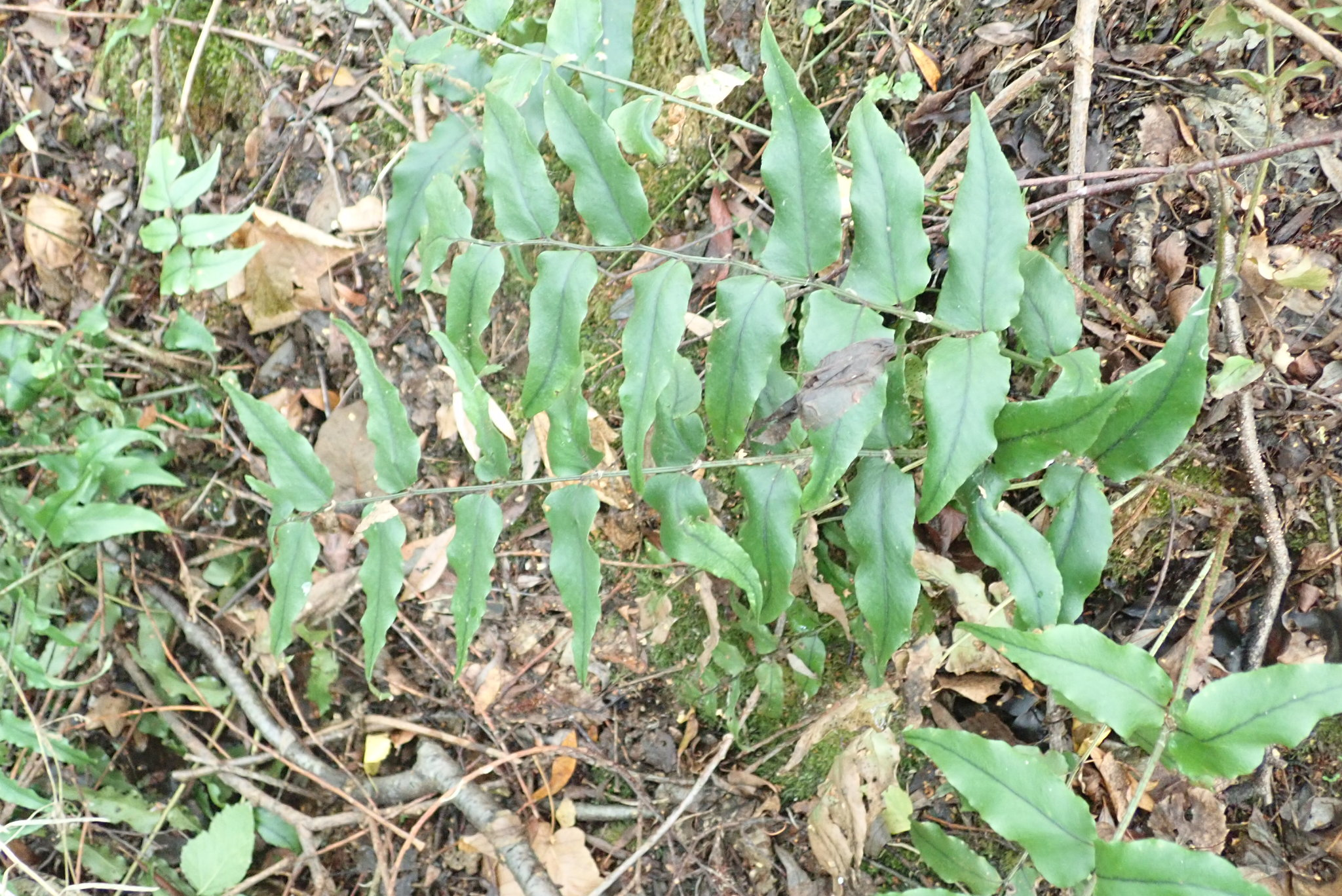

Scientific classification
- Kingdom: Plantae
- Clade: Tracheophytes
- Division: Polypodiophyta
- Class: Polypodiopsida
- Order: Polypodiales
- Suborder: Polypodiineae
- Family: Dryopteridaceae
- Genus: Cyrtomium
- Species: C. fortunei

Binomial name
- Cyrtomium fortunei J.Sm.

= Cyrtomium fortunei =

Species of plant

Cyrtomium fortunei, also known by its common name Fortune's holly-fern, is a species from the genus Cyrtomium. This plant was first described by John Smith. It has gained the Royal Horticultural Society's Award of Garden Merit.
