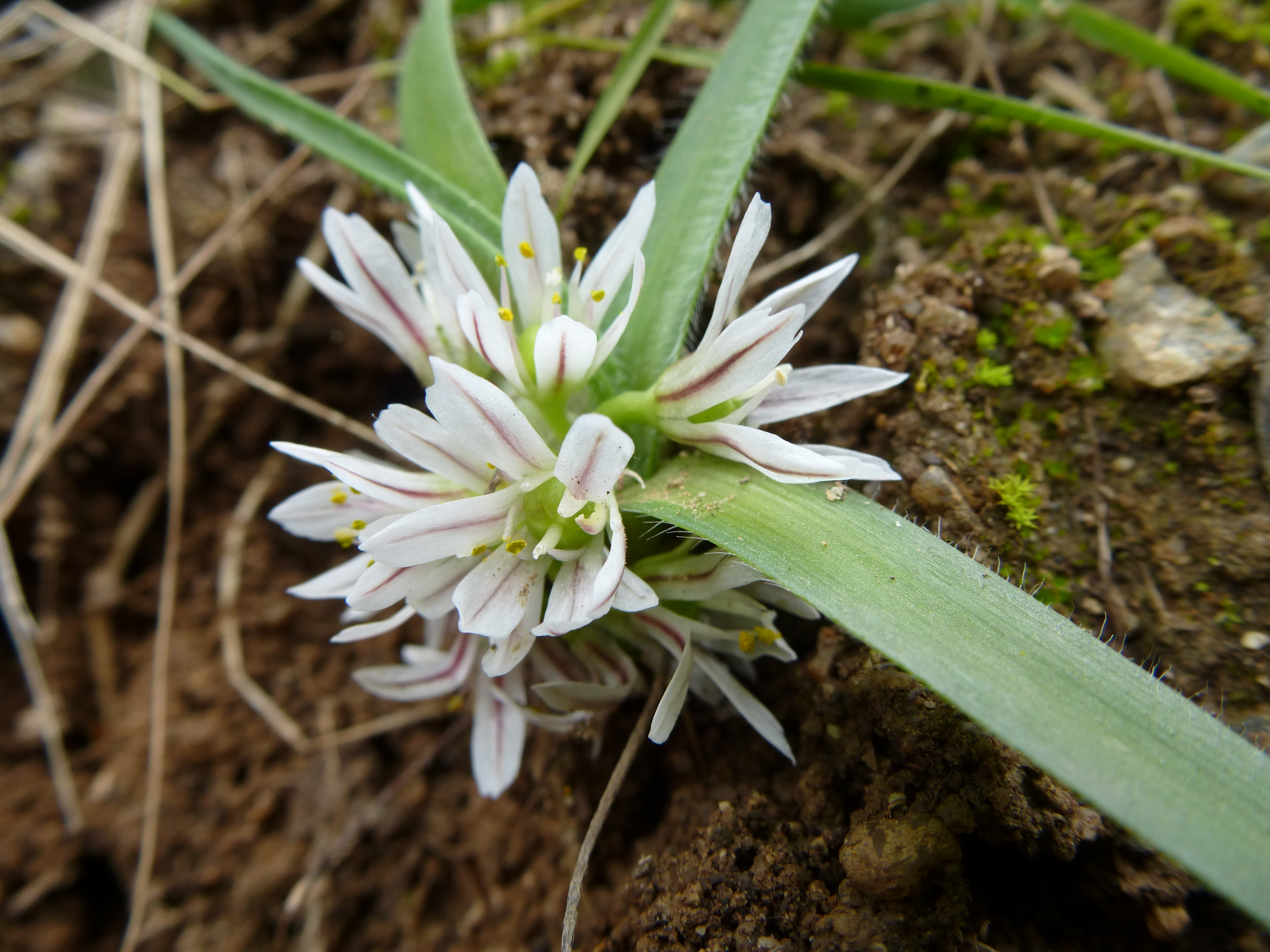

Scientific classification
- Kingdom: Plantae
- Clade: Tracheophytes
- Clade: Angiosperms
- Clade: Monocots
- Order: Asparagales
- Family: Amaryllidaceae
- Subfamily: Allioideae
- Genus: Allium
- Subgenus: A. subg. Amerallium
- Species: A. chamaemoly

Binomial name
- Allium chamaemoly L.

Synonyms
- Allium chamaemoly var. littoralis (Jord. & Fourr.) Maire & Weiller; Allium chamaemoly var. viridulum (Jord. & Fourr.) Maire & Weiller; Allium columnae Bubani; Saturnia cernua Maratti; Saturnia chamaemoly (L.) Salisb.; Saturnia etrusca Jord. & Fourr.; Saturnia littoralis Jord. & Fourr.; Saturnia rubrinervis Jord. & Fourr.; Saturnia viridula Jord. & Fourr.

= Allium chamaemoly =

dwarf garlic

Species of flowering plant

Allium chamaemoly, called dwarf garlic, is a species of garlic native to the Mediterranean region and cultivated elsewhere for its pretty flowers and potently aromatic bulbs. It is found in the wild in Spain (incl Balearic Islands), France (incl Corsica), Malta, Italy (inc Sardinia and Sicily), Greece, the Balkans, Algeria, and Morocco.

Allium chamaemoly is a small plant growing from an underground bulb. Scape is very short or completely absent, so that the umbel forms at ground level. Tepals are white, usually with a purple midvein. Leaves are flat and grass-like, often with long white hairs.

Two formal botanical varieties are recognized:

- Allium chamaemoly subsp. chamaemoly - most of European species range but not North Africa
- Allium chamaemoly subsp. longicaulis Pastor & Valdés - Spain (incl Balearic Is), Algeria, Morocco
