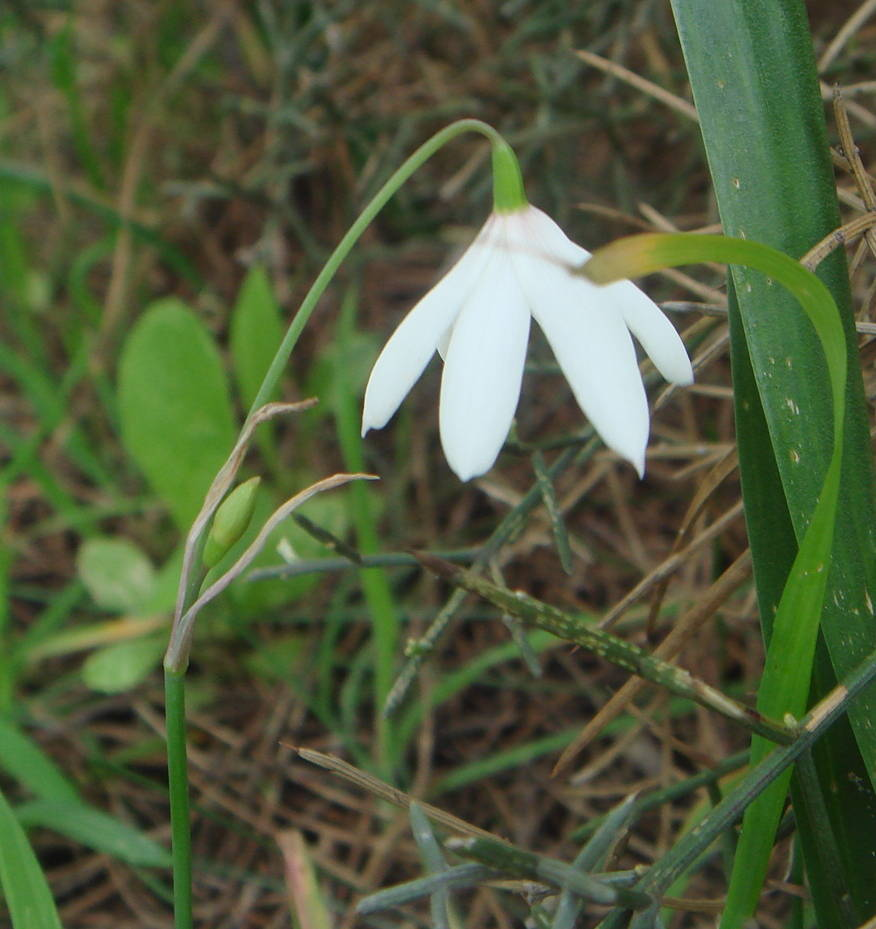
- Growing in Cádiz, Spain

Scientific classification
- Kingdom: Plantae
- Clade: Tracheophytes
- Clade: Angiosperms
- Clade: Monocots
- Order: Asparagales
- Family: Amaryllidaceae
- Subfamily: Amaryllidoideae
- Genus: Acis
- Species: A. trichophylla

Binomial name
- Acis trichophylla Sweet ex G.Don

Synonyms
- Leucojum trichophyllum Brot., nom. illeg.; Acis broteroi Jord. & Fourr.; Leucojum trichophyllum Schousb.; Leucojum grandiflorum Redouté, nom. superfl.; Acis grandiflora G.Don, nom. superfl.

= Acis trichophylla =

Species of flowering plant in the amaryllis family

Acis trichophylla, commonly called the triangular-leaved snowflake, is a species of flowering plant in the family Amaryllidaceae, native to Portugal, Spain and Morocco. It has very narrow leaves. The flowers are produced in late winter or early spring and are usually white, but sometimes pink-tinged or all pink. The species is cultivated as an ornamental bulb, but requires protection from hard frost.

== Description ==
Acis trichophylla is a bulbous perennial, growing up to 30 cm (12 in) tall, although usually shorter. There are generally three very narrow leaves per bulb, appearing before the flowers, each leaf being up to 18 cm (7.1 in) long but only at most 1 mm wide. Flowering is in late winter or early spring. The flowers are white, sometimes with pink tinges or occasionally all pink, and are arranged in groups of two to four on a stem (scape) that is about as long as or longer than the leaves. Each flower is borne on a long stalk (pedicel), up to 45 or 60 mm long, and has six tepals, 12–20 mm long, with sharp tips, that open widely to form a bell shape. The two spathes are shorter than the pedicels. The style is slightly longer than the stamens.

== Taxonomy ==
The nomenclature of Acis trichophylla is somewhat complex. The epithet trichophyllum was first published, in the combination Leucojum trichophyllum, by Peter Schousboe in 1800. The combination was used again as a supposedly new name by Félix Brotero in 1804, but as it had already been published in 1800, Leucojum trichophyllum Brot. is an illegitimate later homonym. In 1829, Robert Sweet suggested that Leucojum trichophyllum belonged in Acis, but did not explicitly use the combination Acis trichophylla nor make clear whose Leucojum name he meant. The combination Acis trichophylla was first used in 1830 by George Don, referring to Sweet (he actually used the masculine form trichophyllus).

Although William Herbert in 1837 also placed the species in Acis, most later botanists used the genus Leucojum, treating it as L. trichophyllum Schousb. In 2004, it was restored to Acis, along with other species of Leucojum, on the basis of a molecular phylogenetic study.

A number of infraspecies have been described, none of which are recognized by the World Checklist of Selected Plant Families as of December 2017. Forms with pinkish flowers have been called f. broteri and f. purpurascens, those with larger flowers var. grandiflorum.

== Distribution and habitat ==
Acis trichophylla is found in central and southern Portugal, south central and south-western Spain and across the Mediterranean in Morocco. It is found in dry sandy ground.

== Cultivation ==
Acis trichophylla is cultivated as an ornamental bulb. It requires protection from frost, and warm dry conditions for a long time in summer, hence growing in an alpine house or bulb frame is recommended. Unless planted deeply, around 15 cm (6 in), it tends to divide into small non-flowering bulbs.
