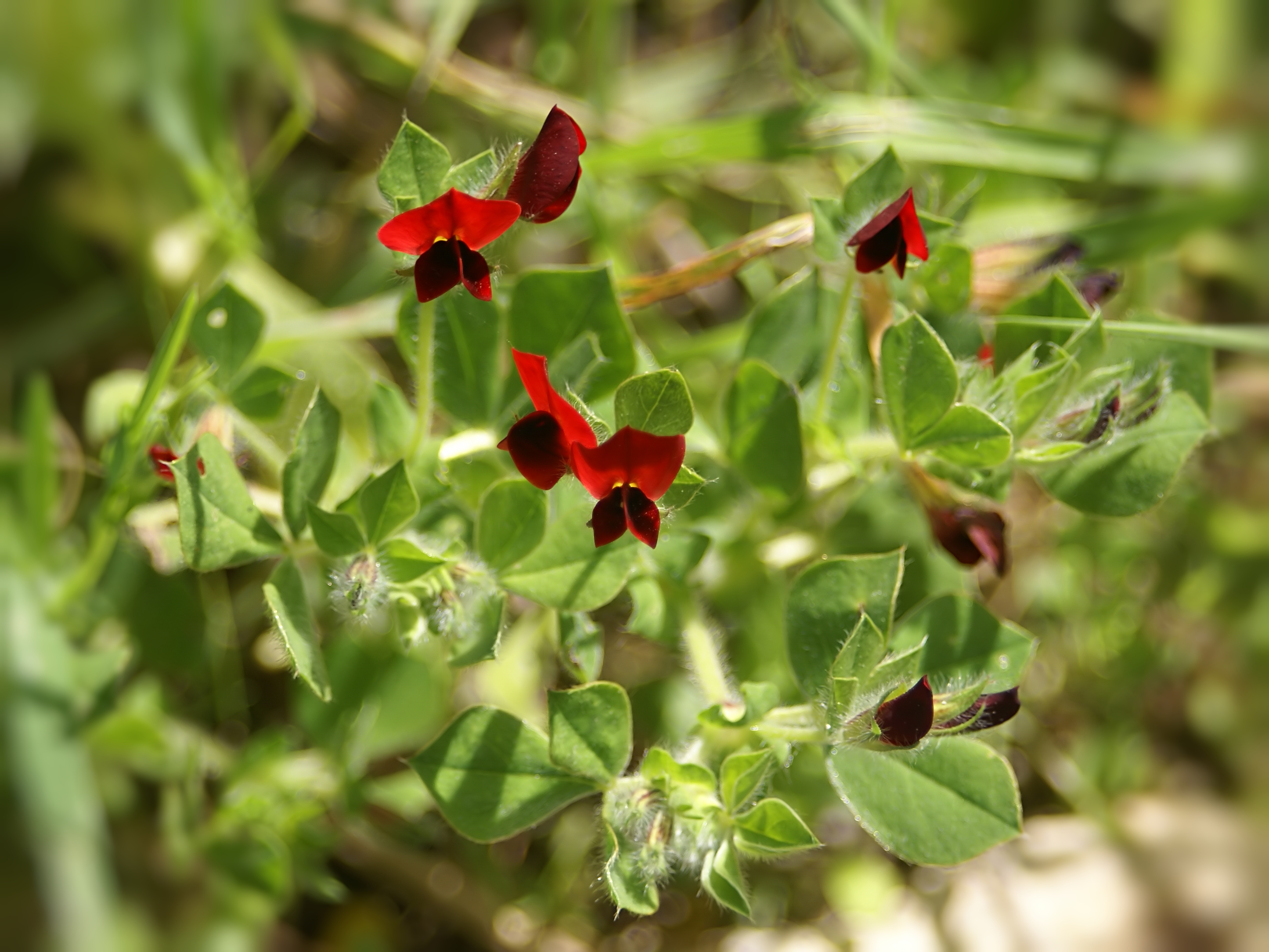

Scientific classification
- Kingdom: Plantae
- Clade: Tracheophytes
- Clade: Angiosperms
- Clade: Eudicots
- Clade: Rosids
- Order: Fabales
- Family: Fabaceae
- Subfamily: Faboideae
- Genus: Lotus
- Species: L. tetragonolobus

Binomial name
- Lotus tetragonolobus L.

Synonyms
- Lotus purpureus (Moench) E.H.L.Krause; Scandalida rubra Medik.; Scandalida tetragonoloba (L.) Medik.; Tetragonolobus edulis Link; Tetragonolobus purpureus Moench; Tetragonolobus siliquosus var. maritimus (L.) Ser.; Tetragonolobus tetragonolobus (L.) Asch. & Graebn.; Lotus palaestinus (Boiss.) Holmboe; Lotus purpureus var. palaestinus (Boiss.) Post; Lotus tetragonolobus subsp. palaestinus Holmboe; Lotus tetraptera Stokes; Tetragonolobus palaestinus Boiss.; Lotus purpureus var. palaestinus (Boiss.) Post; Tetragonolobus pseudopurpureus Uechtr.; Tetragonolobus purpureus subsp. palaestinus (Boiss.) Ponert

= Lotus tetragonolobus =

Species of legume

Lotus tetragonolobus, known as asparagus-pea or winged pea, is an annual leguminous herb native to the countries around the Mediterranean, although introduced elsewhere. It is low growing, and produces a profusion of prominent deep red flowers, followed by seed pods that are longitudinally winged.

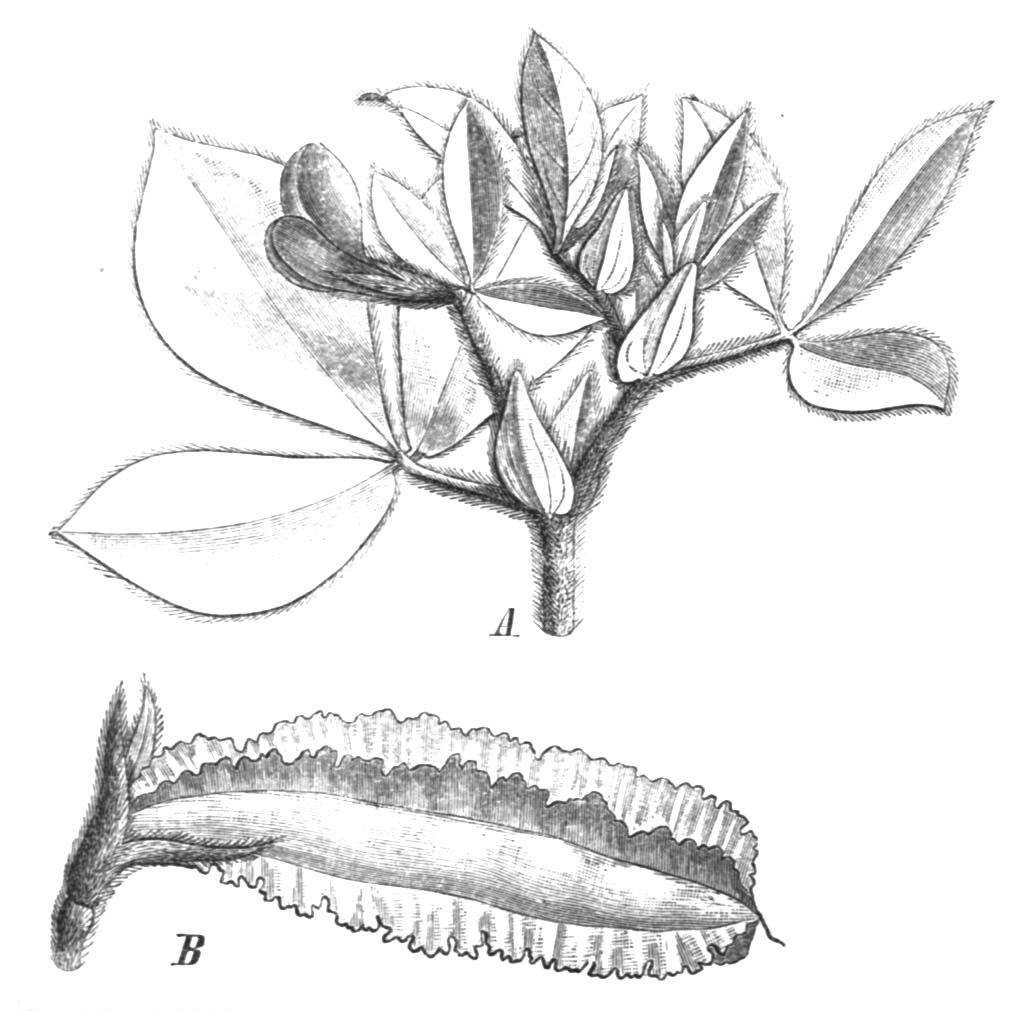
Botanical illustration

It is cultivated for its edible green seed pods, which are one of the vegetables known as asparagus pea or winged pea.
