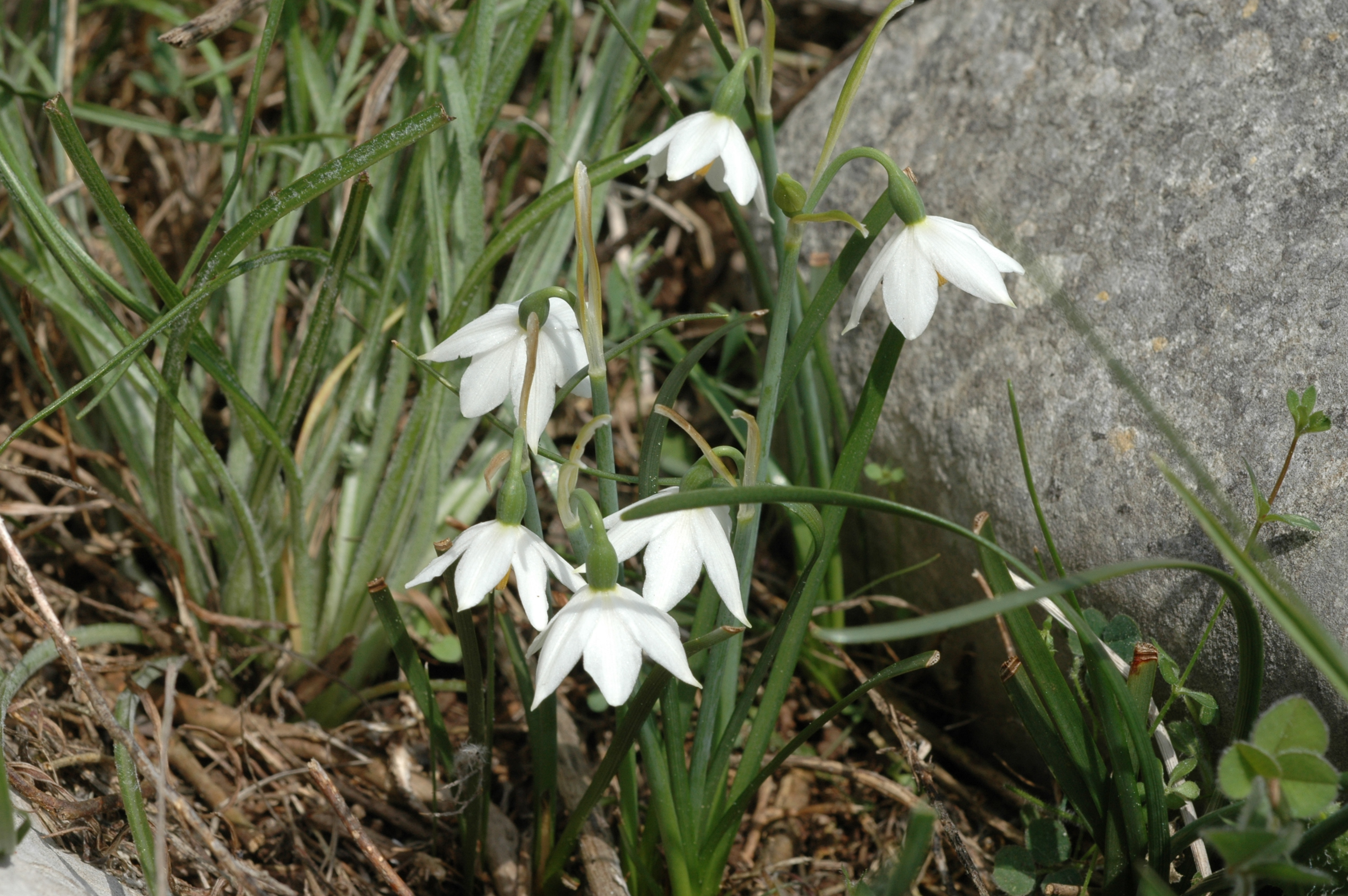

Scientific classification
- Kingdom: Plantae
- Clade: Tracheophytes
- Clade: Angiosperms
- Clade: Monocots
- Order: Asparagales
- Family: Amaryllidaceae
- Subfamily: Amaryllidoideae
- Genus: Acis
- Species: A. nicaeensis

Binomial name
- Acis nicaeensis (Ardoino) Lledó, A.P.Davis & M.B.Crespo

Synonyms
- Leucojum nicaeense Ardoino; Ruminia nicaeensis (Ardoino) Jord. & Fourr.; Acis hiemalis M.Roem.

= Acis nicaeensis =

Species of flowering plant in the amaryllis family

Acis nicaeensis, commonly called the winter snowflake, Mentone snowflake and French snowflake, is a species of flowering plant in the family Amaryllidaceae, native to south-eastern France. A small spring flowering bulb with white flowers, it is cultivated as an ornamental plant.

== Description ==
Acis nicaeensis is a bulbous perennial, growing up to 18 cm (7.1 in) tall, although often less. It generally has a tufted growth habit, with thin leaves appearing before the flowers. The flowers have white tepals, 8–12 mm long with sharply pointed tips. There is usually only one flower per flowering stem (peduncle), although there can be up to three. The flower stalks (pedicels) are 10–18 mm long. The style is just longer than the stamens. The six-lobed ovary is disc-shaped.

== Taxonomy ==
Acis nicaeensis was first described in 1867 by Honoré Ardoino, as Leucojum nicaeensis. The specific epithet nicaeensis refers to Nice, in south-east France, while the Mentone in the common name Mentone snowflake is the Italian name for nearby Menton. In 2004, it was transferred to Acis, along with other species of Leucojum, on the basis of a molecular phylogenetic study.

== Distribution and habitat ==
Acis nicaeensis is native to the Maritime Alps and neighbouring coast of south-eastern France (including Monaco), where it is found on rocky hillsides.

== Cultivation ==
Acis nicaensis is grown as an ornamental spring flowering bulb. It is hardy to frost if planted in a sheltered and sunny position, although often grown in an alpine house or bulb frame.
