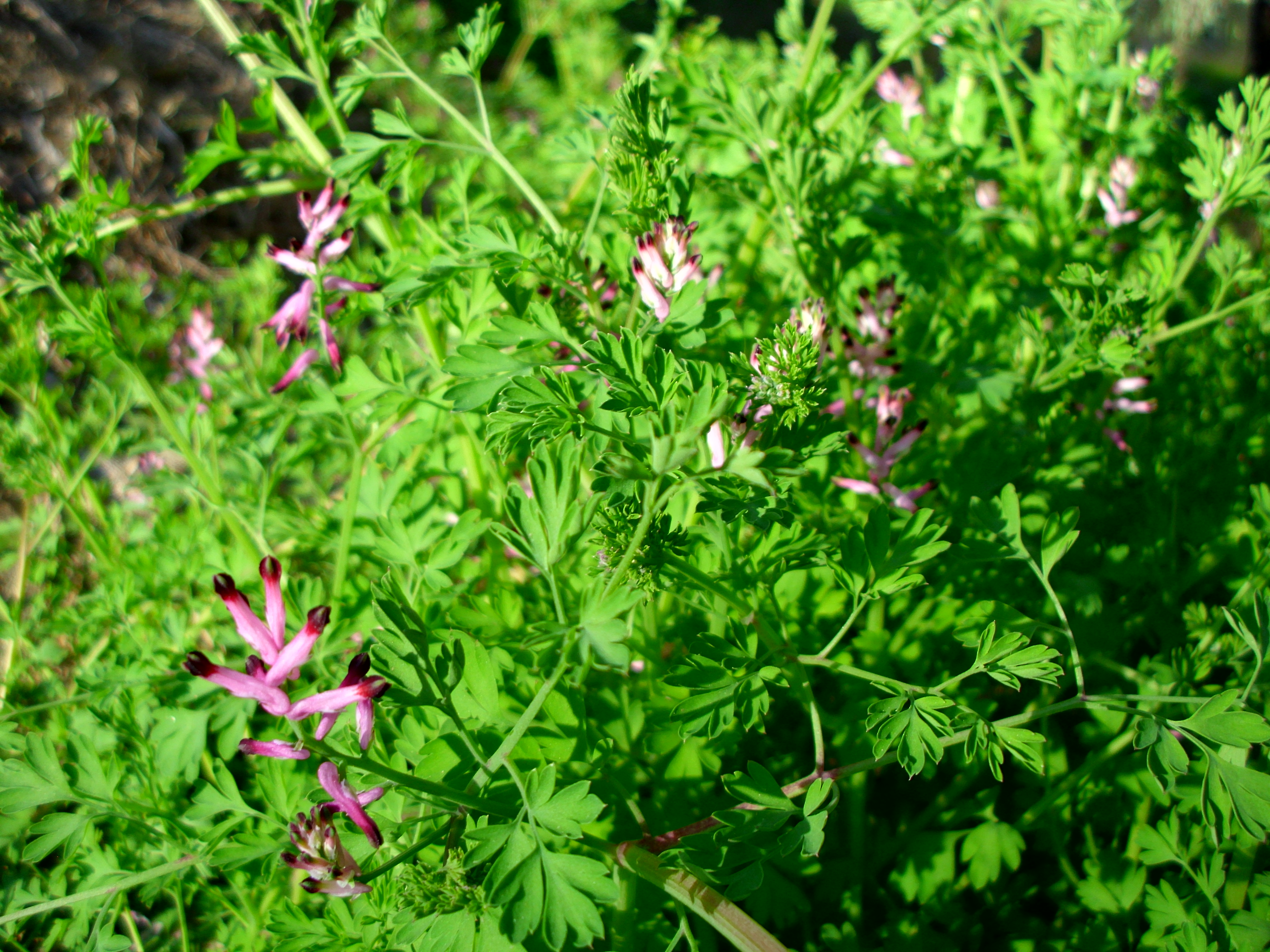

Scientific classification
- Kingdom: Plantae
- Clade: Tracheophytes
- Clade: Angiosperms
- Clade: Eudicots
- Order: Ranunculales
- Family: Papaveraceae
- Genus: Fumaria
- Species: F. muralis

Binomial name
- Fumaria muralis Sond. ex W.D.J.Koch

Synonyms
- Fumaria capreolata var. muralis (Sond. ex W.D.J.Koch) Arcang.; Fumaria media var. muralis (Sond. ex W.D.J.Koch) Batt.

= Fumaria muralis =

Species of plant in the poppy family

Fumaria muralis, known as common ramping-fumitory or wall fumitory, is a flowering herbaceous plant in the poppy family (Papaveraceae) native to western Europe and northwestern Africa.

== Description ==
Fumaria muralis is a delicate annual plant that flowers in spring. It is most easily distinguished by its flowers, which have pink petals with dark red or purple tips. There are about twelve flowers per inflorescence.

The stems are initially erect then become sprawling or climbing. They are weak and many-branched, up to 1000 mm (39.4 in) long, and hairless.

The leaves are green or glaucous-green, polyternate, 2- to 4-pinnatisect with narrowly elliptic or oblong last order segments. The first leaves grow singly and are 7–15 mm (0.3-0.6 in) long with a stalk 7–15 mm (0.3-0.6 in), and have three hairless leaflets. Later leaves become more compound and lobed. Mature leaves are three times deeply lobed with three or more leaflets, 3–15 mm (0.1-0.6 in) long. Alternate leaves form a rosette. Leaf segments are egg-shaped to triangular and usually three-lobed and hairless. The blade is gray-green to blue-green, flat, and up to 80 mm long x 40 mm wide (3.2 x 1.6 in).

The flowers are grouped in axillary racemes. Pedicels are subtended by a linear bract and are straight or recurved outwards at fruitification. The corolla is pink, sometimes lightly so, and dark red or purple at the apex; it is 9–12 mm (0.35-0.47 in) in length. It is made up of four petals of which the outer upper and lower ones are free while the two inner ones are fused into a tube closed at the apex. The upper petal is basally prolonged into a spur and ends with two upturned wings, while the lower one has two narrow, spreading or erect wings. The stigma bears three lobes of which the central one is distinctly smaller than the others. There are two sepals laterally attached to the corolla that are whitish with a green midrib, ovate to broadly oblong, dentate at margin in lower two thirds and measuring 3–5 mm (0.12-0.2 in) long and 1.5–3 mm (0.06-0.12 in) wide.

The fruit is an achene which is globose to broadly ovate with an almost smooth to slightly rugose (wrinkled) surface.

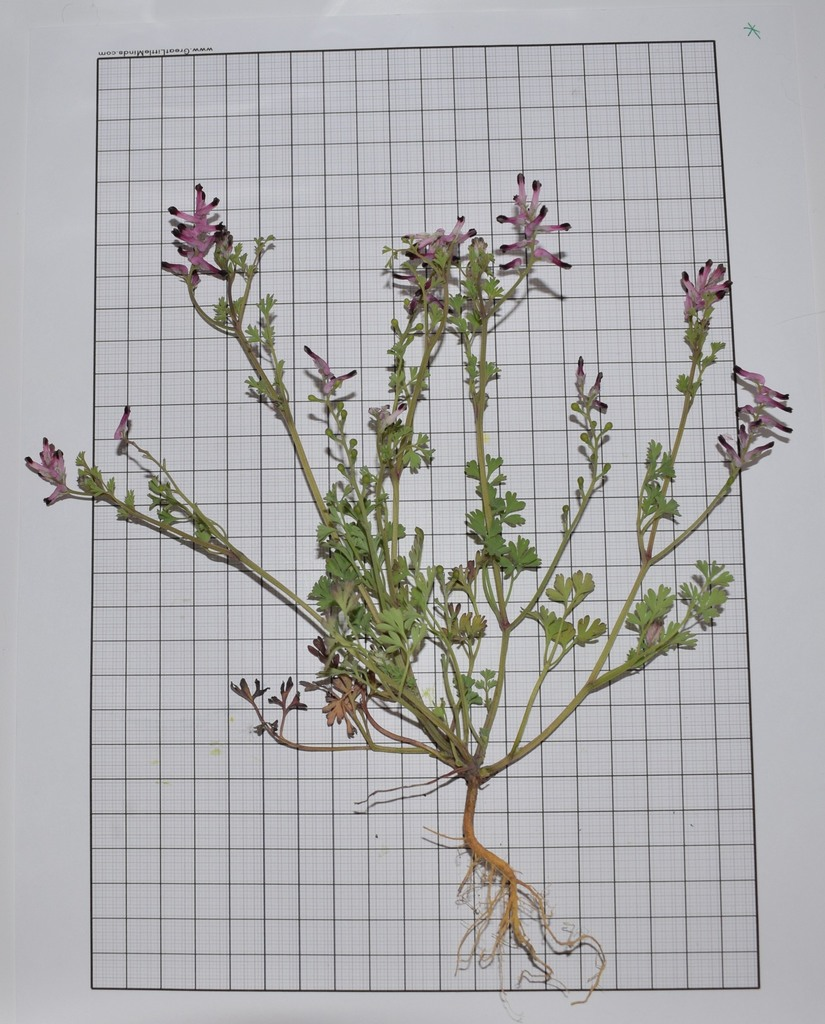
Entire plant

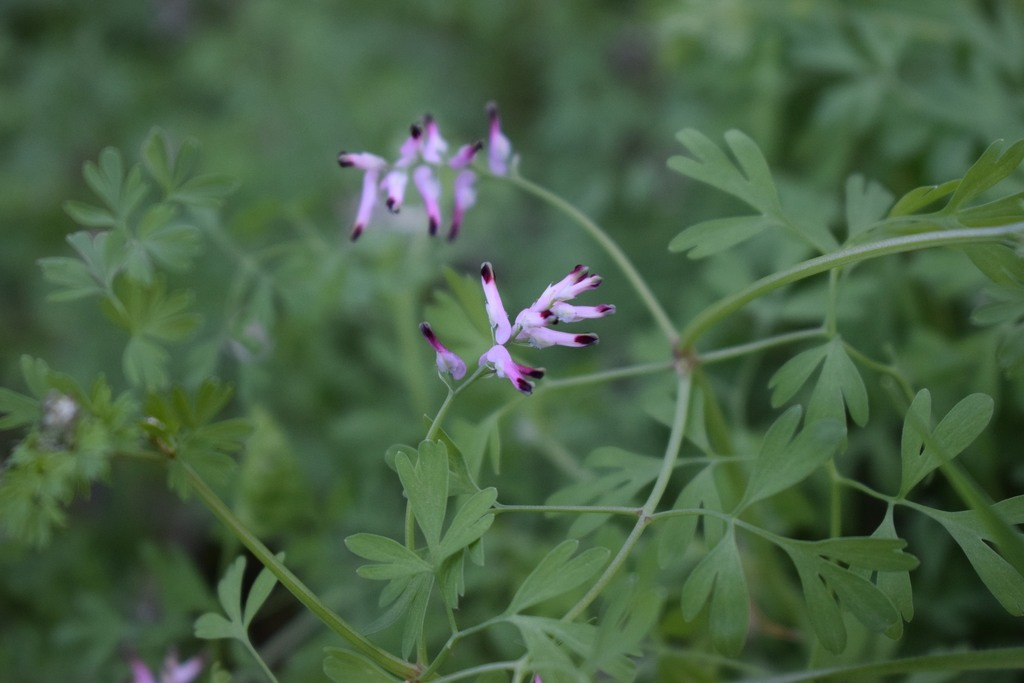
Inflorescence and mature leaves

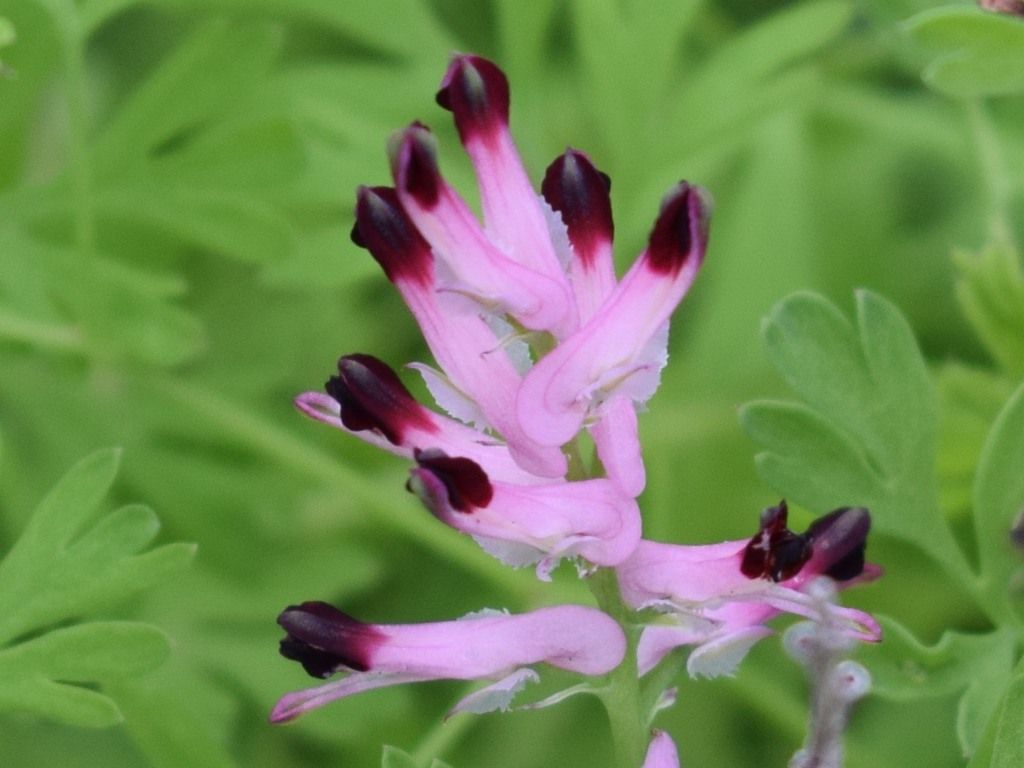
Inflorescence

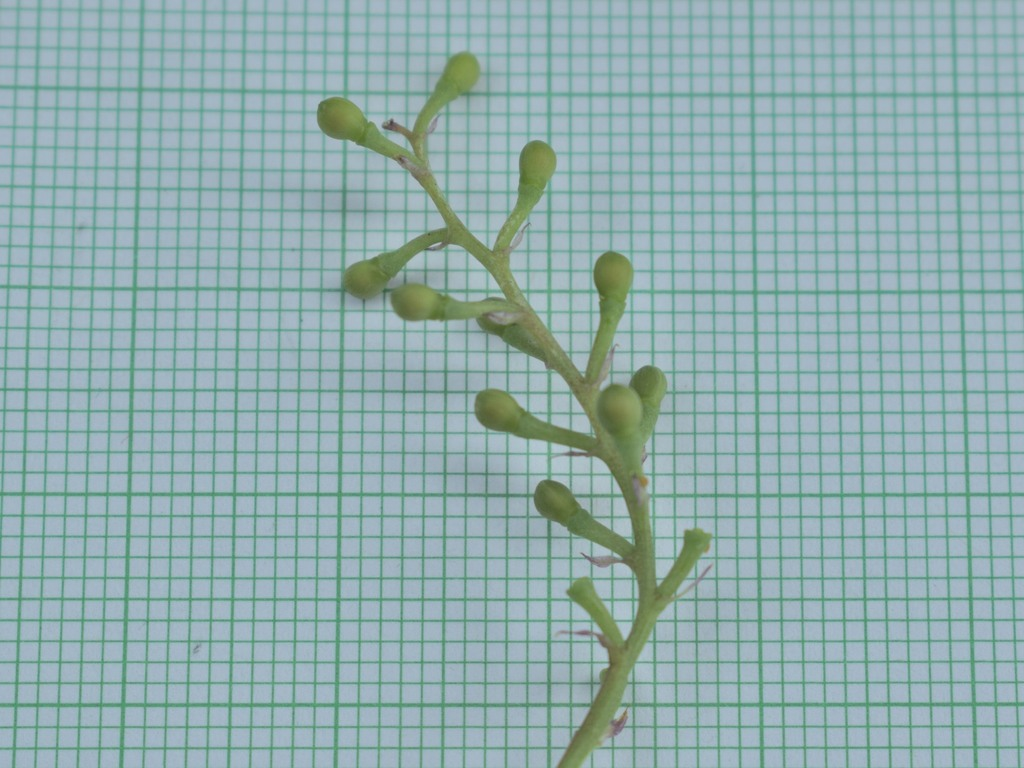
Infructescence

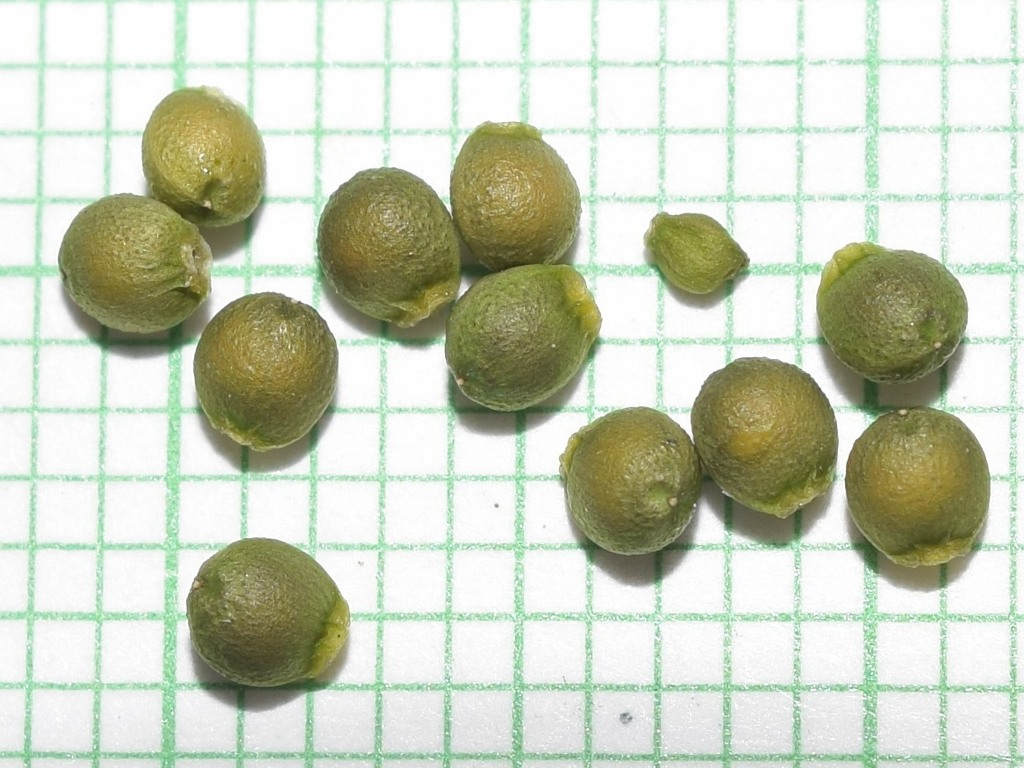
Dried fruits

=== Similar species ===
Similar species include:

- Fumaria bastardii (Bastard's fumitory, tall-ramping fumitory) is very similar but has smaller sepals, shorter peduncle than inflorescence. and strongly rugose fruits. It has pink flowers with purple tips and more than 20 flowers in each inflorescence. May hybridize with F. muralis.
- Fumaria capreolata (whiteflower fumitory) has larger cream-colored flowers with red-black tips. The inflorescence is at least as long as the stalk. May hybridize with F. muralis.
- Fumaria densiflora (dense-flowered fumitory) is very similar to F. muralis but tends to be more purplish-green, the young leaves are smaller with curled lobes, and it has smaller but more numerous flowers.
- Fumaria melillaica is distinguished by its deeply lacerate sepals and strongly rugose fruits. It is restricted to southern Spain and north-eastern Morocco.
- Fumaria officinalis (common fumitory) has smaller purplish pink flowers (6–9 mm long) with 20-40(-50) flowers per inflorescence and fruits that are distinctly broader than long with truncate or emarginate apex.
- Fumaria parviflora (smallflower fumitory)
- Fumaria reuteri has larger flowers (11–13 mm long), subentire sepals, peduncle shorter than raceme, longer spur and stigma, central lobe as large as the lateral ones

== Distribution and habitat ==
F. muralis is native to temperate and Mediterranean regions of western Europe and western North Africa.

In its native range, it is found in Macaronesia, Portugal, France, Belgium, Germany, United Kingdom, Ireland, and Norway.

Outside its native range it is present in Spain, Netherlands, Denmark, Japan, New Zealand, Australia, South Africa and the United States.

F. muralis prefers to grow in open, bare patches and is considered a weed of pastures, roadsides, gardens, footpaths, coastal shrub lands and disturbed areas.

== Subspecies ==
Three subspecies are recognized:

- Fumaria muralis subsp. boroei (Jord.) Pugsley (north-western Europe southwards to France)
- Fumaria muralis subsp. muralis (the most widespread subspecies)
- Fumaria muralis subsp. neglecta Pugsley (endemic to Great Britain)
