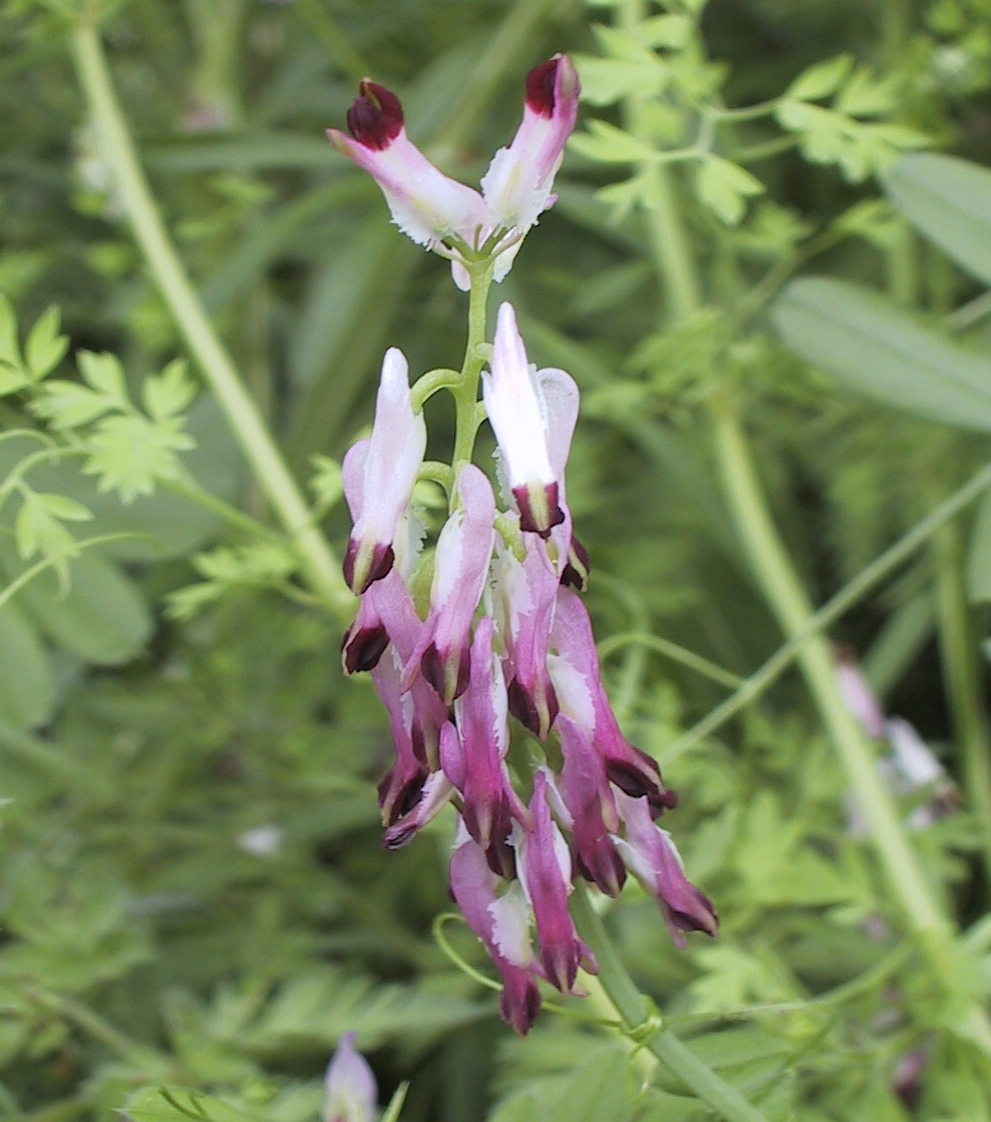

Scientific classification
- Kingdom: Plantae
- Clade: Tracheophytes
- Clade: Angiosperms
- Clade: Eudicots
- Order: Ranunculales
- Family: Papaveraceae
- Genus: Fumaria
- Species: F. purpurea

Binomial name
- Fumaria purpurea Pugsley

= Fumaria purpurea =

Species of plant in the poppy family

Fumaria purpurea, known as purple ramping-fumitory, is an annual flowering herbaceous plant in the poppy family which is endemic to the British Isles.

== Description ==
A sprawling or climbing plant with brittle stems which exude white sap when broken, up to about 2 m tall, typically found growing up through hedges. The whole plant is hairless and smooth, with pale green stems and leaves, and flowers that range from white through to dark purple, but generally pink. The leaves are flat but often curled and deeply divided into numerous irregular-shaped lobes, based on multiples of three (a ternate pattern). The inflorescence is a raceme with 15-24 individual flowers on short recurved stalks, each hermaphroditic flower being 10–13 mm long, with large oval sepals up to 6.5 mm in length, and 4 petals arranged into a characteristic tube shape. The fruits are roughly spherical, 2.5 mm in diameter, with a distinct ring or neck at the base when fresh.

Distinctive features for separating this species from other fumitories are the purplish flowers that are strongly bent back along the stalk, the large sepals and neck on the fruits.

== Distribution and habitat ==
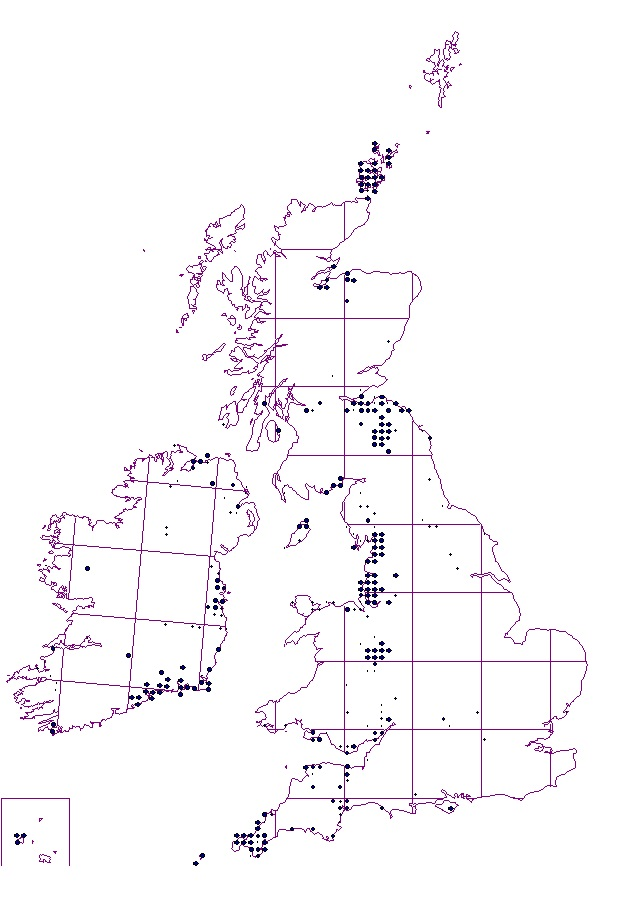
Distribution of purple ramping-fumitory, as shown in the BSBI handbook

Fumaria purpurea has only been recorded in Britain, Ireland, the Isle of Man and the Channel Isles (an area sometimes referred to by naturalists as the British Isles), which makes it endemic to this area. It has a striking and unusual distribution pattern, being found in Britain mainly along a vertical line from Devon to Orkney. It grows in hedges and on disturbed ground, including gardens, arable fields and construction sites. It was first collected in 1726 by Johann Jacob Dillenius, "ad sepes prope Shrewsbury" (in hedges near Shrewsbury, where it still occurs), according to a specimen at Oxford University (OXF) which was identified much later by Pugsley. In Britain and Ireland it is classed as "least concern" by the JNCC and the National Parks and Wildlife Service, respectively, while it is also listed as "vulnerable" in England and "critically endangered" in Wales.

== Taxonomy ==
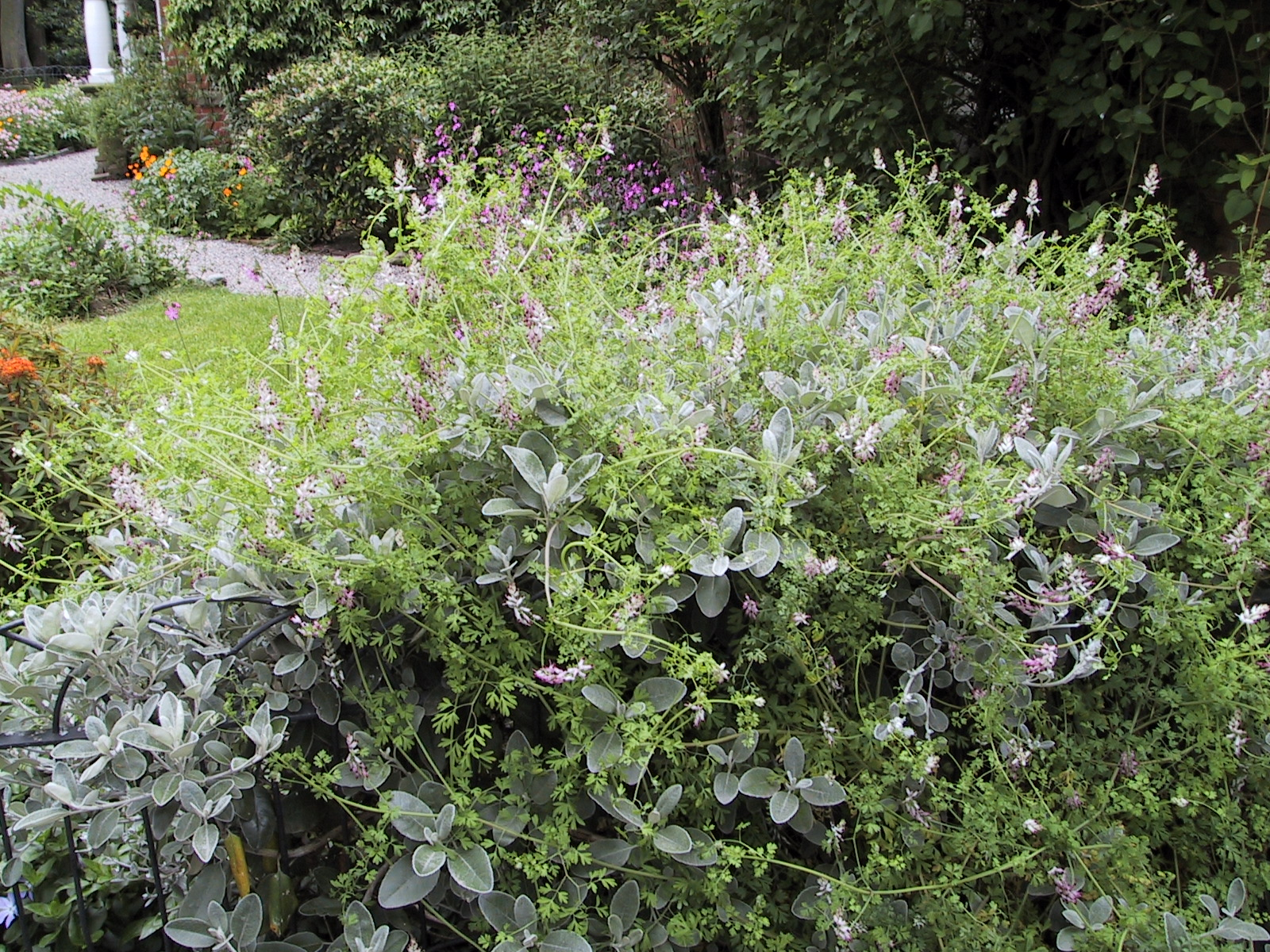
Typical growth form of purple ramping-fumitory in the gardens of Attingham Park

Purple ramping-fumitory was named in 1902 by H.W. Pugsley, who also described two varieties: var. longisepala, with sepals up to 6.5 mm long, and var. brevisepala, with shorter sepals only 5 mm long, which could be confused with F. muralis var. boraei. The two varieties are usually ignored now. There is some debate about its origin and its relationship to other species in the genus. Some authorities consider it to be closely related to F. muralis because of chemical and cytological similarities, while others place it alongside F. capreolata, owing to their morphological similarity.

Fumaria purpurea has the chromosome number 2n = 80.
