= P. alba =

P. alba may refer to:

- Plumeria alba, a large evergreen shrub species native from Central America and the Caribbean
- Populus alba, the white poplar, a tree speciesnative from Spain and Morocco through central Europe to central Asia
- Prenanthes alba, the white rattlesnake root, a plant species
- Prosopis alba, the algarrobo blanco, a tree species found in Argentina
- Pseudofumaria alba, the white corydalis, a plant species

== See also ==
- Alba (disambiguation)
