= Lidén =

Lidén is a surname of Swedish origin. Notable persons with the surname include:

- Anders Lidén (born 1949), Swedish diplomat
- Anki Lidén (born 1947), Swedish actress
- Daniel Lidén, Swedish drummer
- Jan Lidén (born 1949), Swedish businessman
- Johan Hinric Lidén (1741–1793), Swedish scholar
- Klara Lidén (born 1979), American artist
- Magnus Lidén (born 1951), Swedish botanist
- Valter Lidén (1887–1969), Swedish footballer
