= Fumaria occidentalis =

Scientific classification
- Kingdom: Plantae
- Clade: Tracheophytes
- Clade: Angiosperms
- Clade: Eudicots
- Order: Ranunculales
- Family: Papaveraceae
- Genus: Fumaria
- Species: F. occidentalis

Binomial name
- Fumaria occidentalis Pugsley

Species of flowering plant in the poppy family

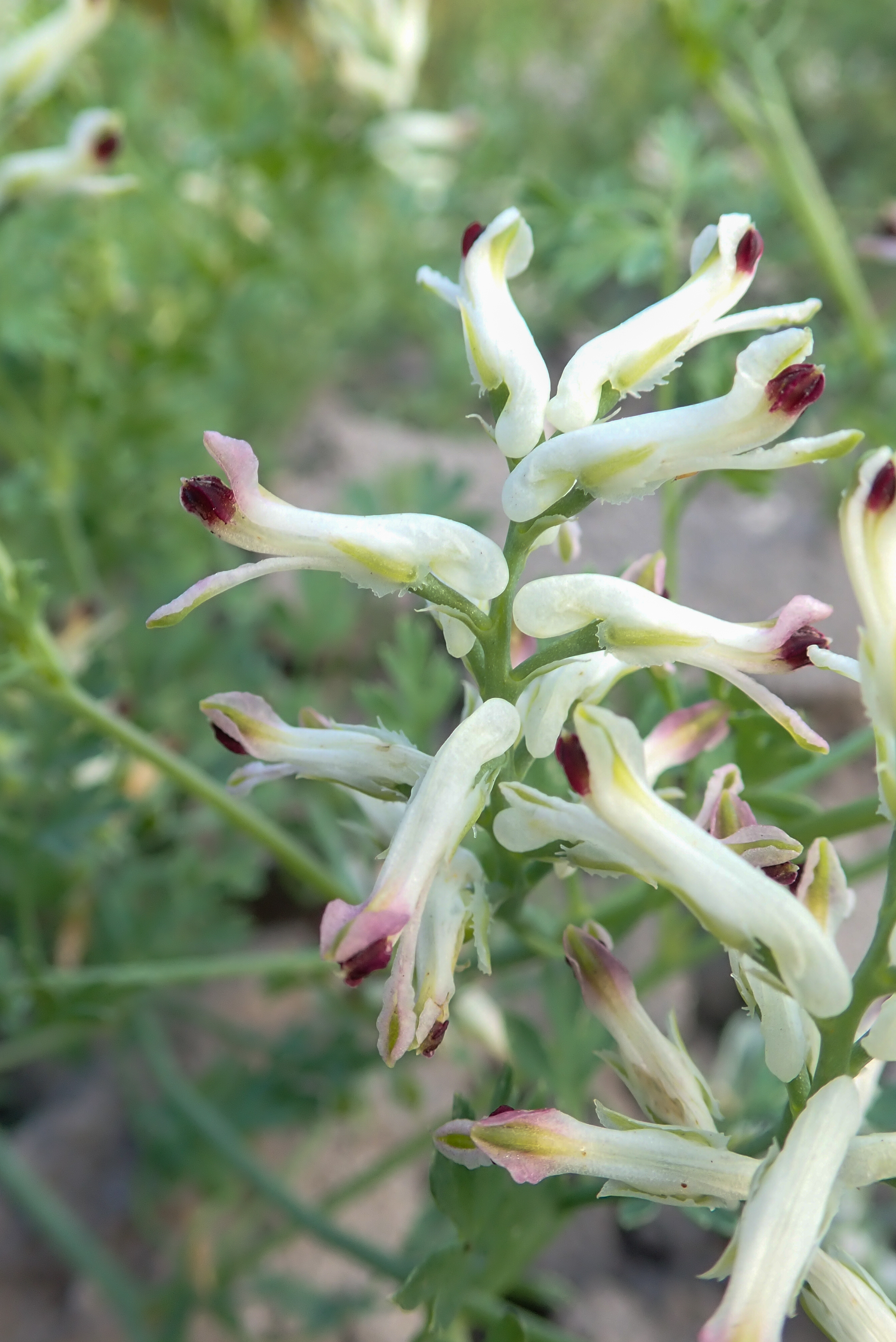
Fumaria occidentalis

Fumaria occidentalis, the western ramping-fumitory, is a species of flowering plant in the genus Fumaria that is endemic to Cornwall. It is the largest of the British fumitories, and was discovered in 1904.

== Distribution ==
Fumaria occidentalis is restricted to "the warmest districts in Cornwall", comprising the westernmost parts of mainland Cornwall and the Isles of Scilly, from near Padstow around Land's End towards The Lizard. Within the Isles of Scilly, it only occurs on St. Mary's, although there are historical records of its occurrence on St. Martin's.

== Description and ecology ==
Fumaria occidentalis is the largest fumitory to grow in the United Kingdom, with flowers 12–14 millimetres (0.47–0.55 in) long. Their petals are initially whitish (except the dark pink tips), becoming pink later; the sepals are 4–5.5 mm (0.16–0.22 in) by 2–3 mm (0.08–0.12 in), and toothed towards the base. Its fruit are also larger than those of the other British species of Fumaria, at up to 3 mm × 3 mm (0.12 in × 0.12 in).

Fumaria occidentalis is an annual plant, flowering from March on the Isles of Scilly, but in May or June on the Cornish mainland. It can be locally abundant in various types of arable and waste land, including field edges and Cornish hedges.

== Taxonomy ==
Fumaria occidentalis was first described by Herbert William Pugsley in 1904. In 1902, Pugsley had seen herbarium specimens that he could not assign to any British species, and encountered the plant in person in 1904 while in Cornwall "for a short holiday". The botanist Eliza Standerwick Gregory was also credited with the discovery of the Cornish fumitory. She reported that she found it on the edge of a wood at Lelant according to F. Hamilton Davey's 1909 Flora of Cornwall.

It is closely related to Mediterranean taxa such as Fumaria agraria.
