= Pale corydalis =

Pale corydalis is a common name used to refer to:

- Corydalis flavula, an annual plant native to the eastern United States, also known as yellow fumewort
- Capnoides sempervirens, an annual or biennial plant native to northern North America
- Pseudofumaria alba, also known as white corydalis
