= Fumaria gaillardotii =

Scientific classification
- Kingdom: Plantae
- Clade: Tracheophytes
- Clade: Angiosperms
- Clade: Eudicots
- Order: Ranunculales
- Family: Papaveraceae
- Genus: Fumaria
- Species: F. gaillardotii

Binomial name
- Fumaria gaillardotii Boiss.

Synonyms
- Fumaria agraria subsp. major

Species of plant

Fumaria gaillardotii is a species of plant in the family Papaveraceae.

== Sources ==
This article incorporates text from a free content work. Licensed under CC0 (license statement/permission). Text taken from Fumaria gaillardotii. Encyclopedia of Life.
