= Fumaria abyssinica =

Scientific classification
- Kingdom: Plantae
- Clade: Tracheophytes
- Clade: Angiosperms
- Clade: Eudicots
- Order: Ranunculales
- Family: Papaveraceae
- Genus: Fumaria
- Species: F. abyssinica

Binomial name
- Fumaria abyssinica Hammar (1858)

Synonyms
- Fumaria australis Pugsley

Species of flowering plant in the poppy family

Fumaria abyssinica is an herbaceous annual plant in the poppy family Papaveraceae. It is native to East Africa and the Arabian Peninsula. It grows in upland rainforest and bamboo forest, and has become a weed in local farms.

== Description ==
Plants have stems to 60 cm (24 in) long and sometimes climb. The leaves are pinnatisect. Its inflorescences consists of 10–20 pedicels bearing 5–6 mm long, ovate-acuminate pink flowers with purple petal tips.
