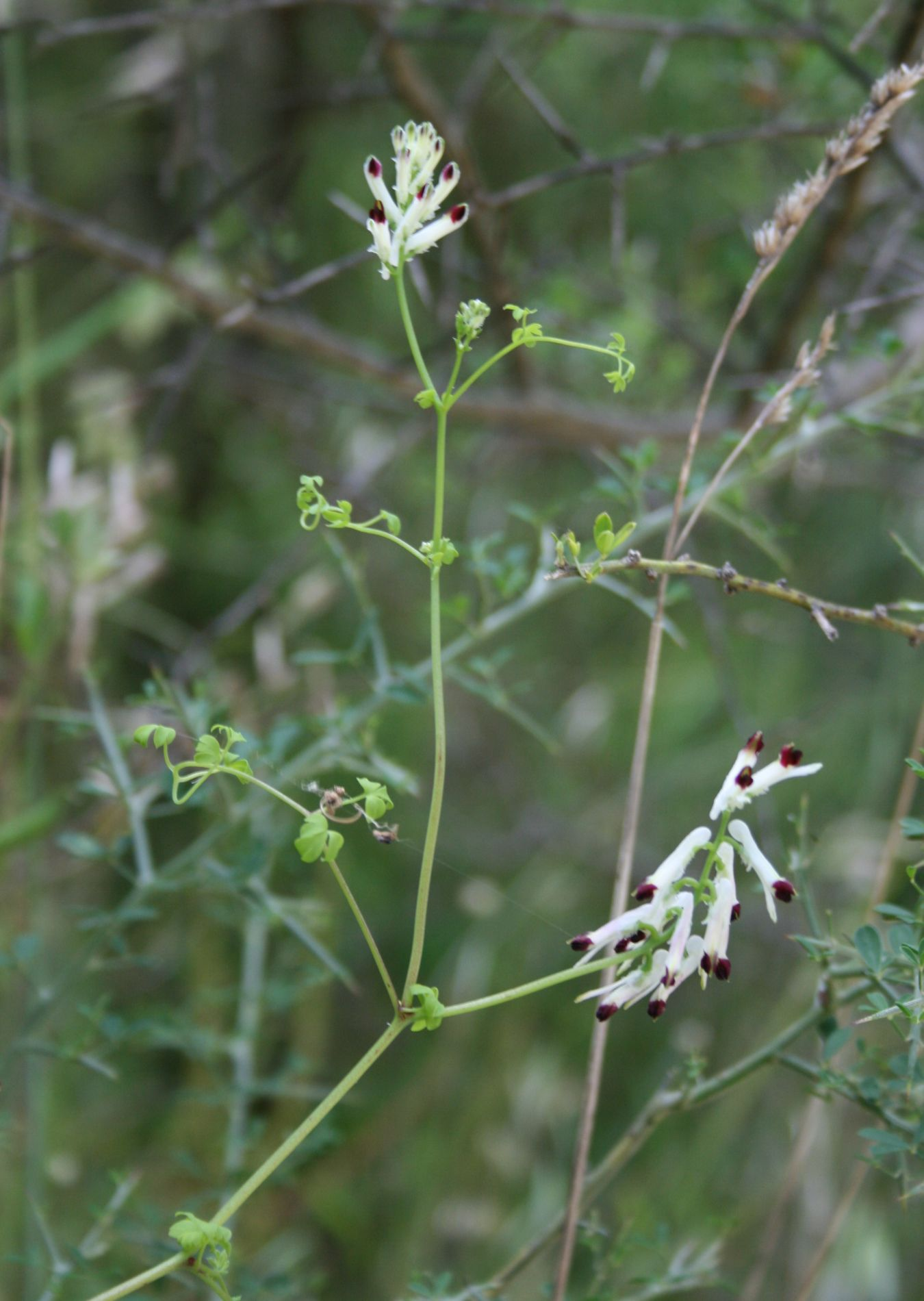

Scientific classification
- Kingdom: Plantae
- Clade: Tracheophytes
- Clade: Angiosperms
- Clade: Eudicots
- Order: Ranunculales
- Family: Papaveraceae
- Genus: Fumaria
- Species: F. flabellata

Binomial name
- Fumaria flabellata Gasparr.

Synonyms
- Fumaria capreolata subsp. flabellata

= Fumaria flabellata =

Species of plant

Fumaria flabellata is a species of plants in the family Papaveraceae.

== Sources ==
This article incorporates text from a free content work. Licensed under CC0 (license statement/permission). Text taken from Fumaria flabellata. Encyclopedia of Life.
