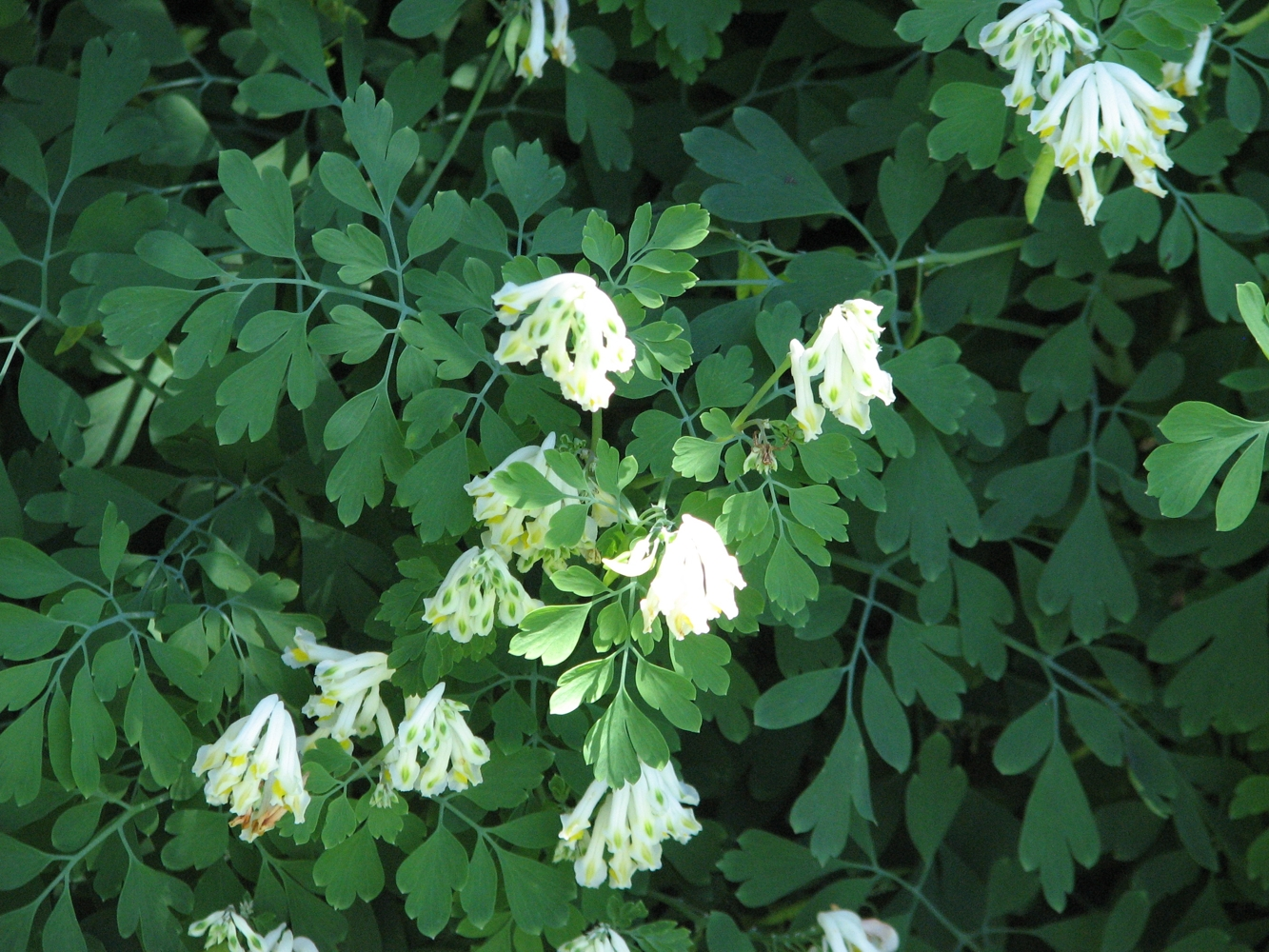
- Pseudofumaria alba

Scientific classification
- Kingdom: Plantae
- Clade: Tracheophytes
- Clade: Angiosperms
- Clade: Eudicots
- Order: Ranunculales
- Family: Papaveraceae
- Subfamily: Fumarioideae
- Tribe: Fumarieae
- Subtribe: Fumariinae
- Genus: Pseudofumaria; Medik.

Species
- See text

= Pseudofumaria =

Genus of flowering plants in the poppy family

Pseudofumaria is a genus of herbaceous perennial plants native to Europe, formerly included in the genus Corydalis.

There are two species:

- Pseudofumaria alba (Mill.) Lidén (syn. Corydalis ochroleuca)
  northwest Balkans
- Pseudofumaria lutea (L.) Borkh (syn. Corydalis lutea)
  Switzerland and Italy
