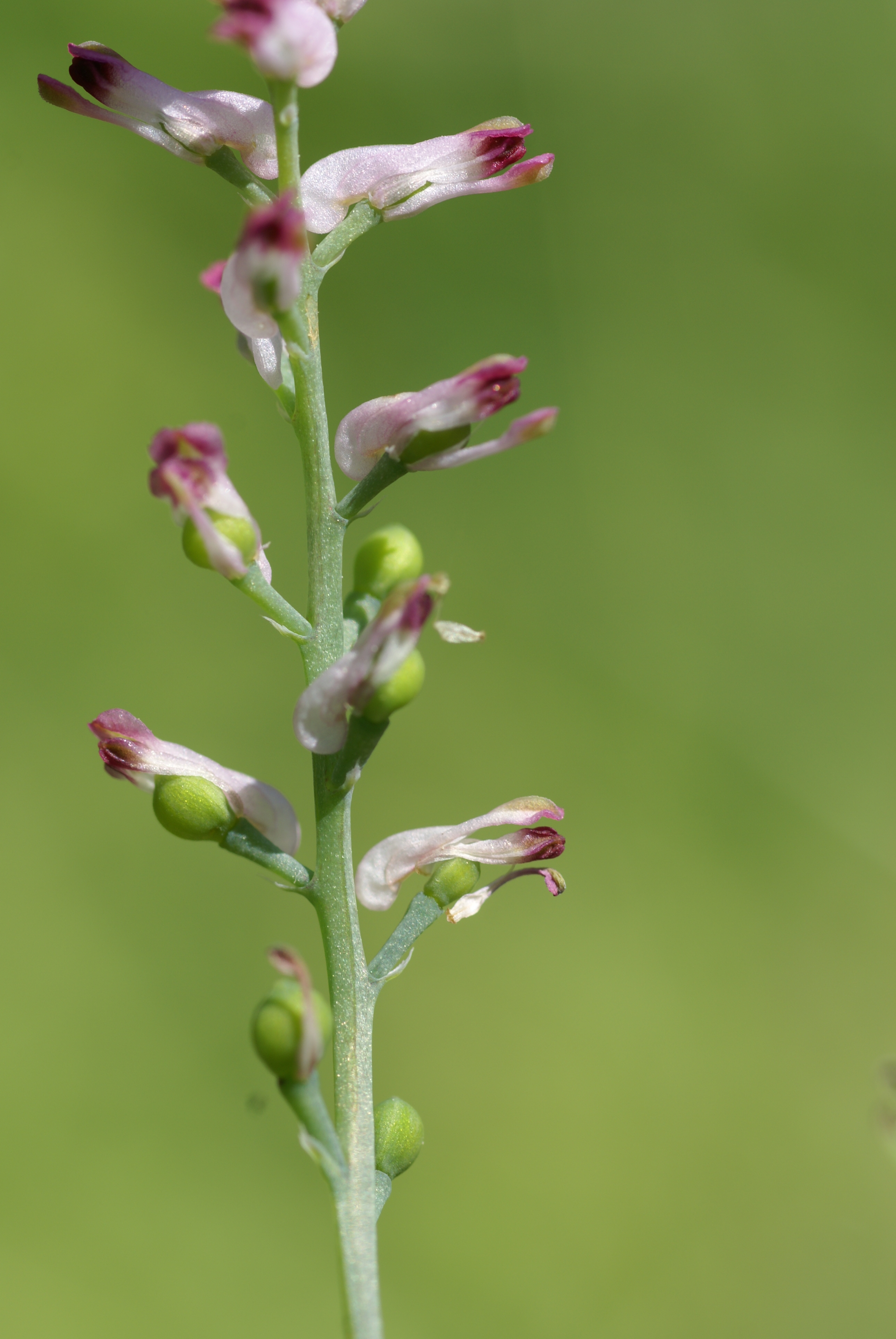

Scientific classification
- Kingdom: Plantae
- Clade: Tracheophytes
- Clade: Angiosperms
- Clade: Eudicots
- Order: Ranunculales
- Family: Papaveraceae
- Genus: Fumaria
- Species: F. vaillantii

Binomial name
- Fumaria vaillantii Loisel.

Synonyms
- Fumaria caespitosa

= Fumaria vaillantii =

Species of plant

Fumaria vaillantii, or earthsmoke, is a species of perennial herb in the poppy family (Papaveraceae). It was first described by the French botanist Jean-Louis-Auguste Loiseleur-Deslongchamps in 1809.

== Description ==
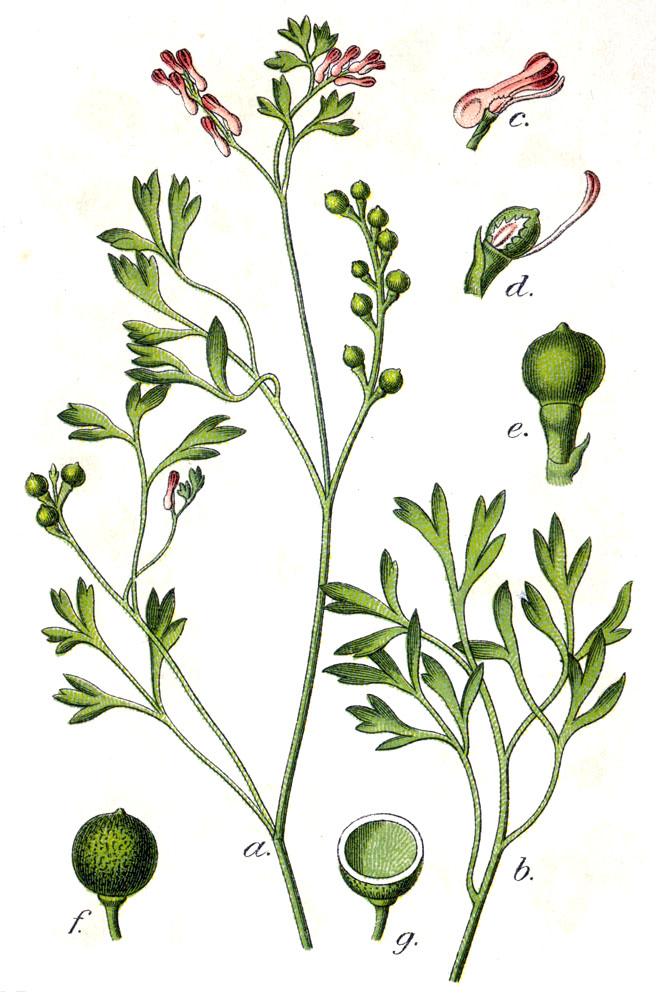
Botanical drawing of Fumaria vaillantii.

Plants grow herbaceous up to 30 cm tall. Stems are branched and grow suberect to diffuse. Leaves are twice pinnate, with leaflets linear to narrowly lanceolate and up to 2 mm wide. The plant is covered in a whitish/grey waxy layer (pruinose) which rubs of upon touch.

Fumaria vaillantii flowers May to October. Inflorescences are racemose and contain 5-16 zygomorph flowers, which sit on short stalks, with lanceolate, scarious bracts 1.5-3 mm long. Sepals are 0.5-1 mm long and have a incised-dentate edge. The corolla is 5-6 mm long and pale pink with a darker redish-purple apex. Four petals form the characteristic floral shape of Fumaria species, the upper petal forms the spur, a rounded tube-like projection at the base of the flower. The lower petal is spatulate with and protrudes the other petals slightly. The two inner petals have a dark purple tip. After flowering, globose fruits are forming which contain a seed (nut) and are around 2 mm wide and finely wrinkled.

Chromosome numbers are 2n = 32.

== Distribution ==
Fumaria vaillantii is distributed over a vast area covering most of centra and southern Europe, northern Africa, south and southwest Asia, reaching as far east as Xinjiang province. In the north it reaches the Baltic states. It is considered to be introduced in Sweden, Finnland, UK, US and Bangladesh.

== Gallery ==
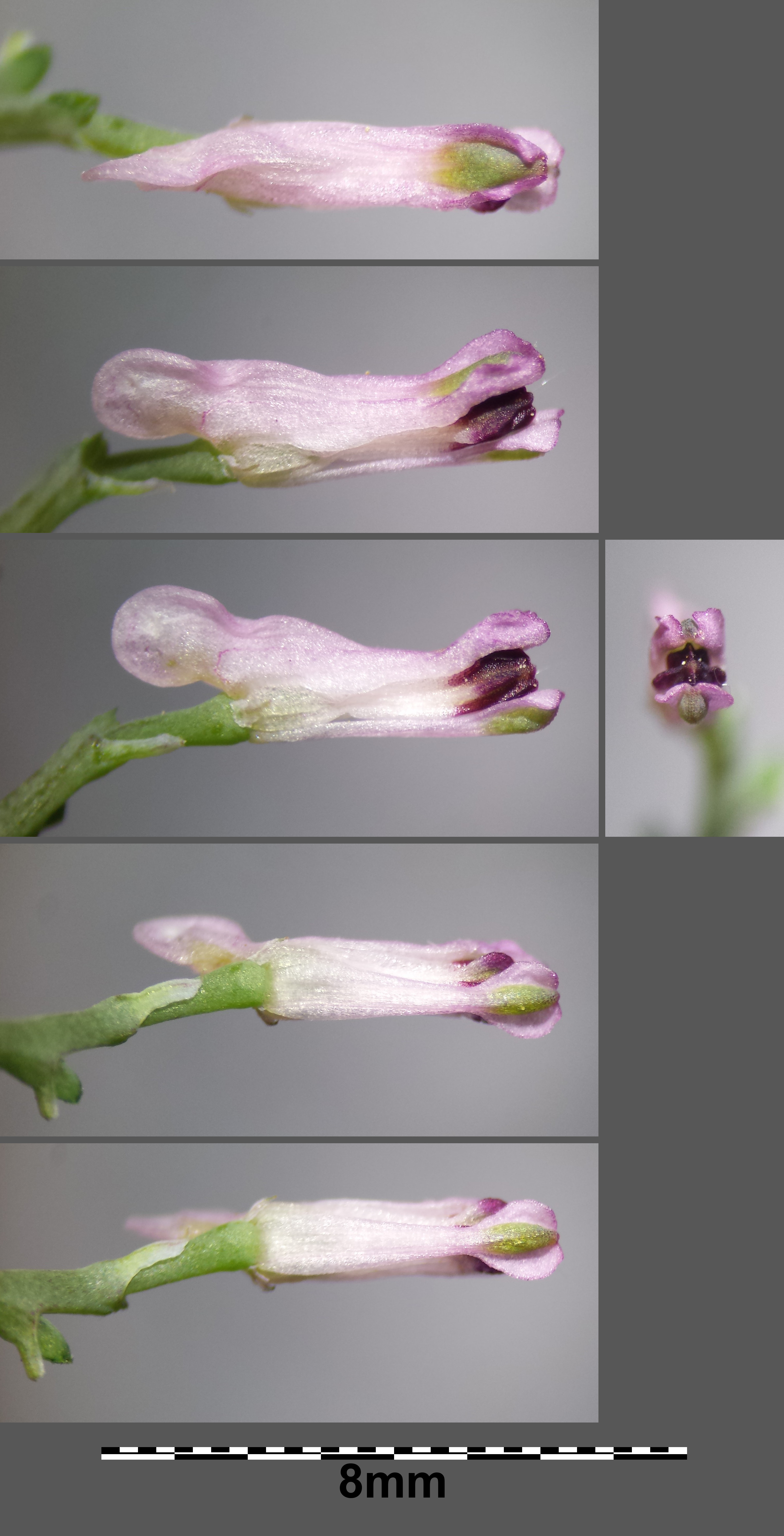
Side view of a flower.

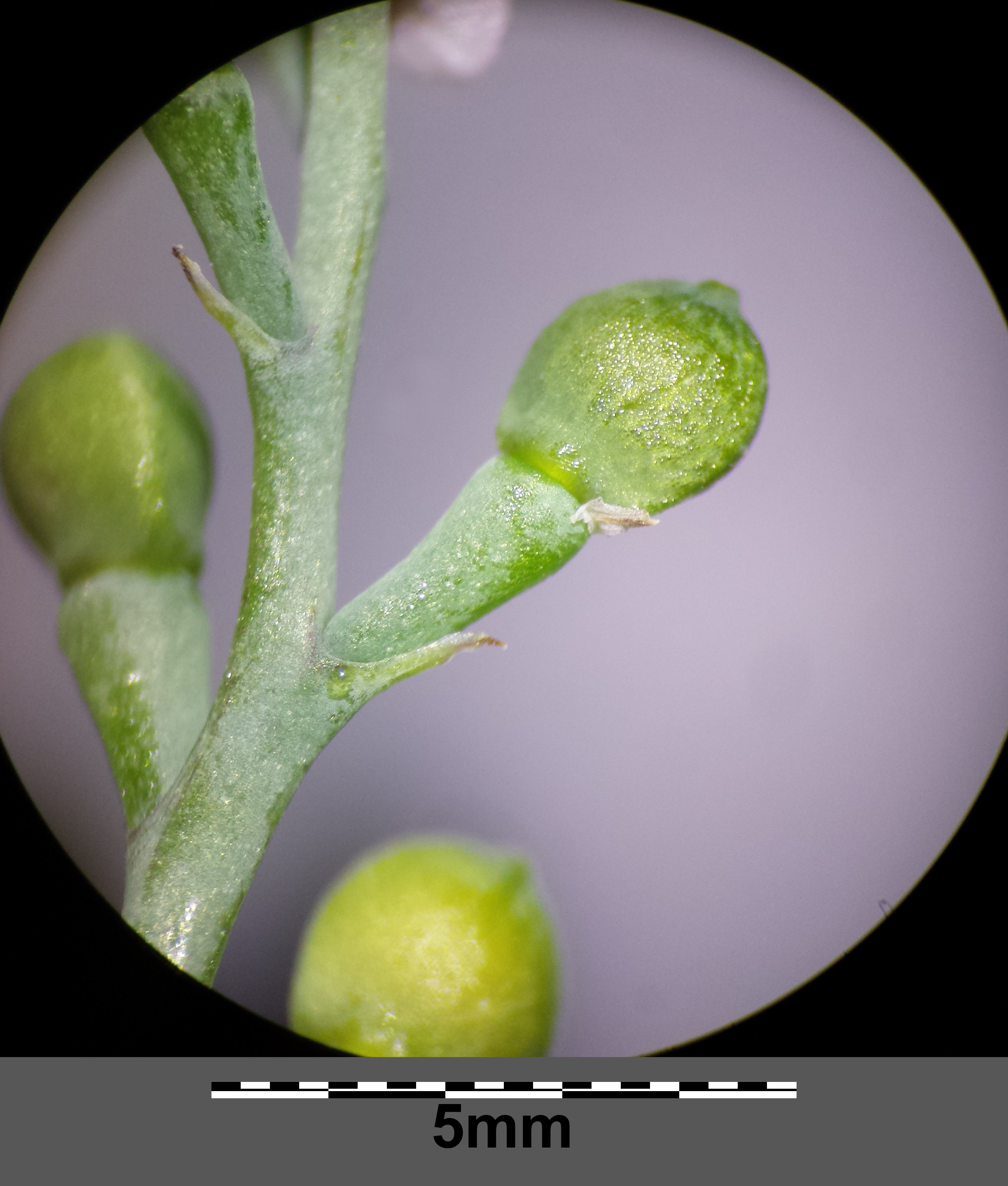
Fruit, bracts, pedicel.

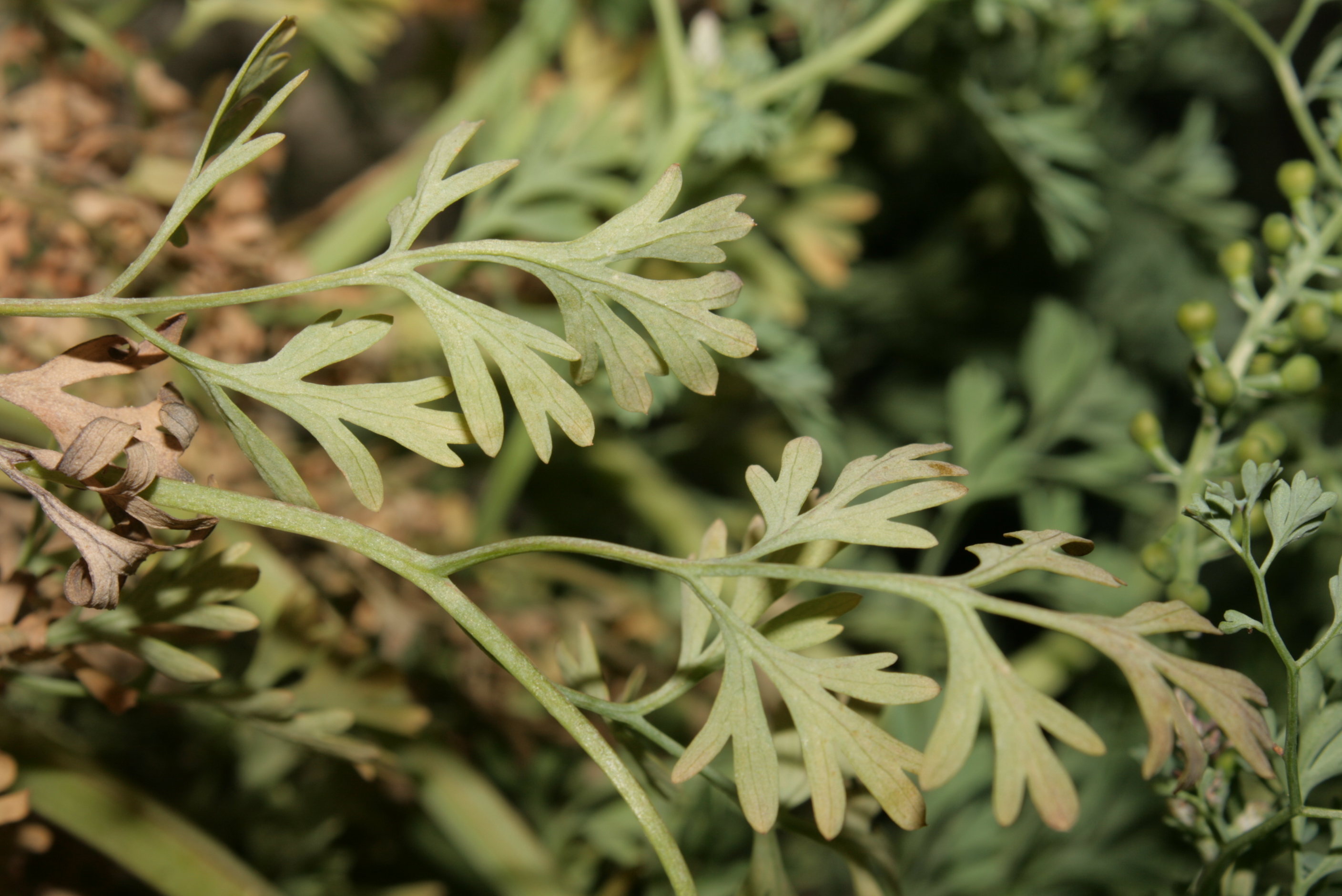
Pinnate leaf.

Inflorescence

== Sources ==
This article incorporates text from a free content work. Licensed under CC0 (license statement/permission). Text taken from Fumaria vaillantii. Encyclopedia of Life.
