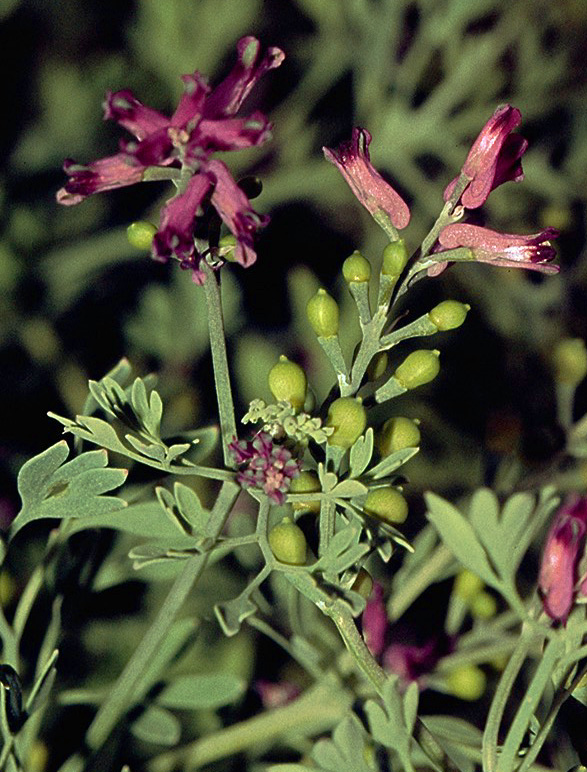

Scientific classification
- Kingdom: Plantae
- Clade: Tracheophytes
- Clade: Angiosperms
- Clade: Eudicots
- Order: Ranunculales
- Family: Papaveraceae
- Genus: Fumaria
- Species: F. schleicheri

Binomial name
- Fumaria schleicheri Soyer-Willemet

= Fumaria schleicheri =

Species of plant

Fumaria schleicheri is a species of annual herb in the family Papaveraceae. They have a self-supporting growth form and have simple, broad leaves. Individuals can grow to 19 cm.

== Sources ==
This article incorporates text from a free content work. Licensed under CC0 (license statement/permission). Text taken from Fumaria schleicheri. Encyclopedia of Life.
