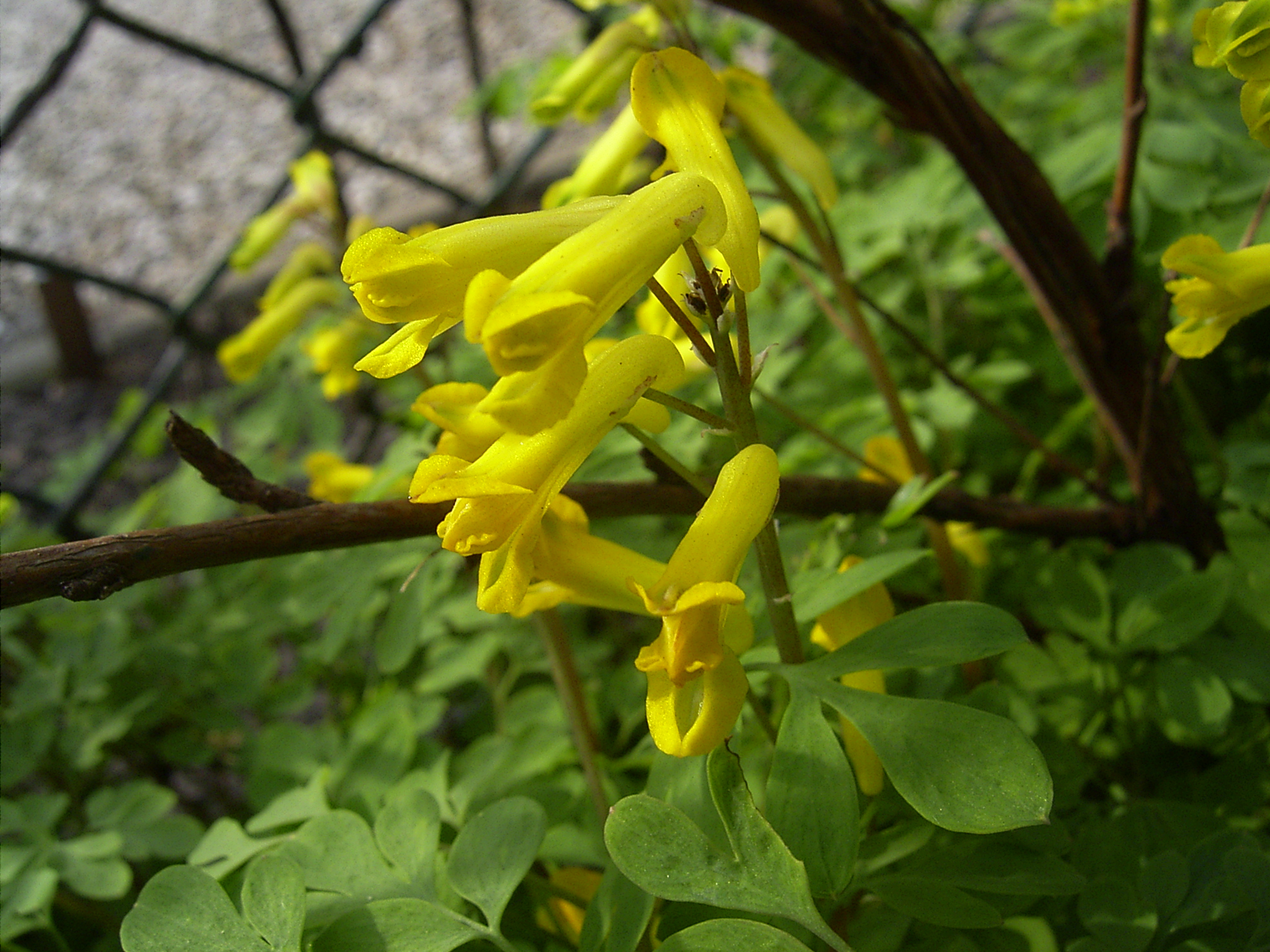

Scientific classification
- Kingdom: Plantae
- Clade: Embryophytes
- Clade: Tracheophytes
- Clade: Angiosperms
- Clade: Eudicots
- Order: Ranunculales
- Family: Papaveraceae
- Genus: Pseudofumaria
- Species: P. lutea

Binomial name
- Pseudofumaria lutea (L.) Borkh.

Synonyms
- Corydalis lutea (L.) DC; Fumaria lutea L.

= Pseudofumaria lutea =

Species of flowering plant in the poppy family

Pseudofumaria lutea (syn. Corydalis lutea), the yellow corydalis or rock fumewort, is a short-lived perennial plant in the poppy family Papaveraceae. It is native to the southern foothills of the south-western and central Alps of Italy and Switzerland, but widely introduced elsewhere.

== Characteristics ==
Yellow corydalis grows to 30–38 cm (12–15 in) tall. Leaves are finely divided and yellow-green to gray-green, often remaining over winter.

Flowers are 2 centimetres (0.75 in) long, borne in racemes on short, branched, leafy stems from late spring to autumn. They have 4 petals; the top and bottom ones crested, the top one with a short, rounded spur curved downwards, the 2 inner ones connected at the tip.

Its seeds, dark brown with white elaiosomes, are held in oval, flat pods. Plants self-seed abundantly.

== Cultivation ==
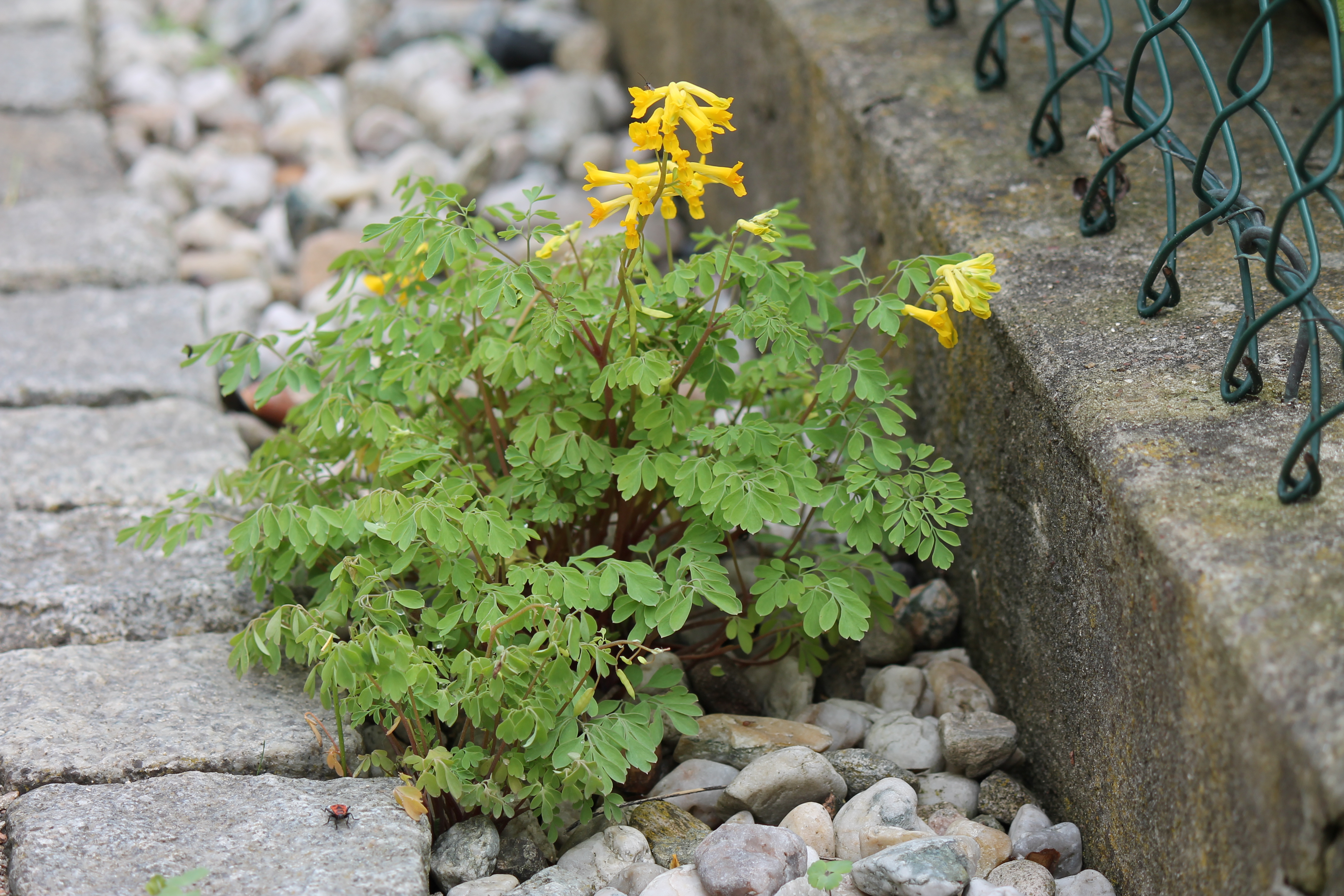
Yellow corydalis growing in gravel

Yellow corydalis is hardy to –34 °C (-30 °F; hardiness zone 4). It does best in light shade with good moisture, but will tolerate both full sun and deep shade. It grows wild in cracks in old walls where drainage is excellent.
