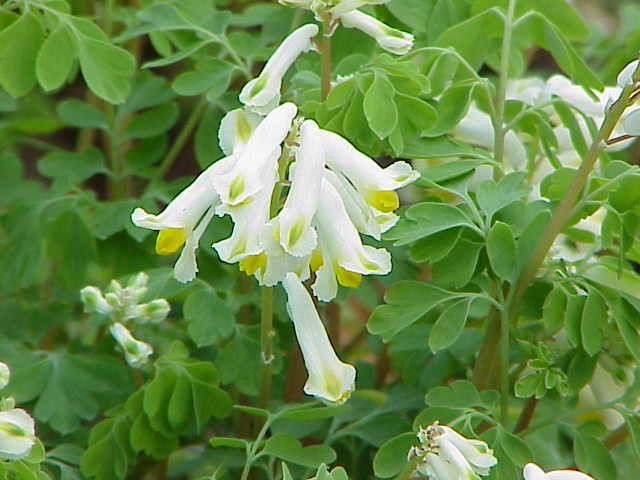
- Inflorescence

Scientific classification
- Kingdom: Plantae
- Clade: Tracheophytes
- Clade: Angiosperms
- Clade: Eudicots
- Order: Ranunculales
- Family: Papaveraceae
- Genus: Pseudofumaria
- Species: P. alba

Binomial name
- Pseudofumaria alba (Mill.) Lidén

Synonyms
- Corydalis alba (Mill.) Mansf. Corydalis ochroleuca W. D. J. Koch; Fumaria alba Mill.

= Pseudofumaria alba =

White corydalis

Species of flowering plants in the poppy family

Pseudofumaria alba (pale corydalis or white corydalis) is a short-lived perennial plant in the family Papaveraceae.

Flowers are white with yellow throats, borne in racemes on short, branched stems above the foliage from spring through autumn.

Leaves are gray-green and fern-like, and often remain through winter.
