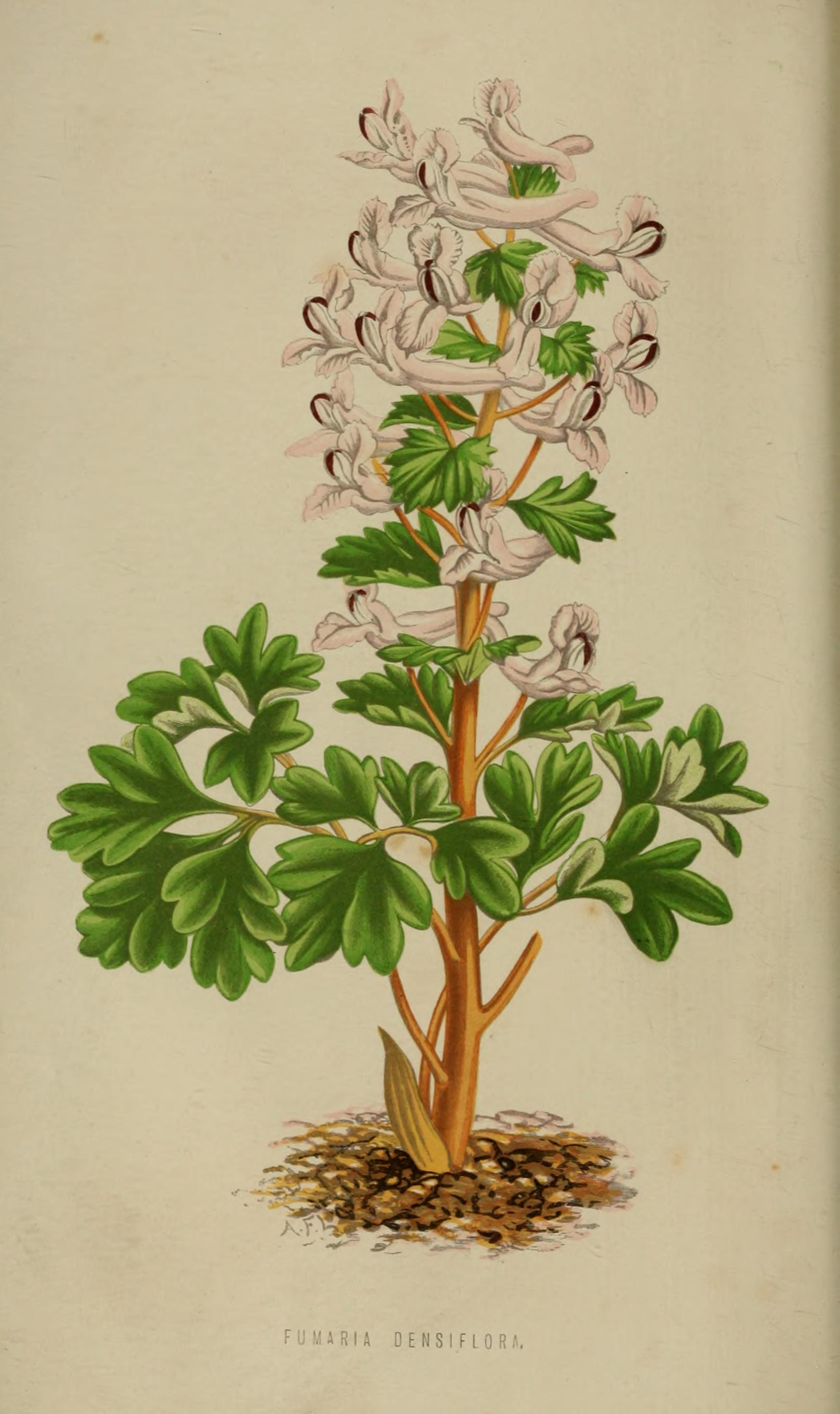

Scientific classification
- Kingdom: Plantae
- Clade: Tracheophytes
- Clade: Angiosperms
- Clade: Eudicots
- Order: Ranunculales
- Family: Papaveraceae
- Genus: Fumaria
- Species: F. densiflora

Binomial name
- Fumaria densiflora DC.

Synonyms
- Fumaria micrantha

= Fumaria densiflora =

Species of plant

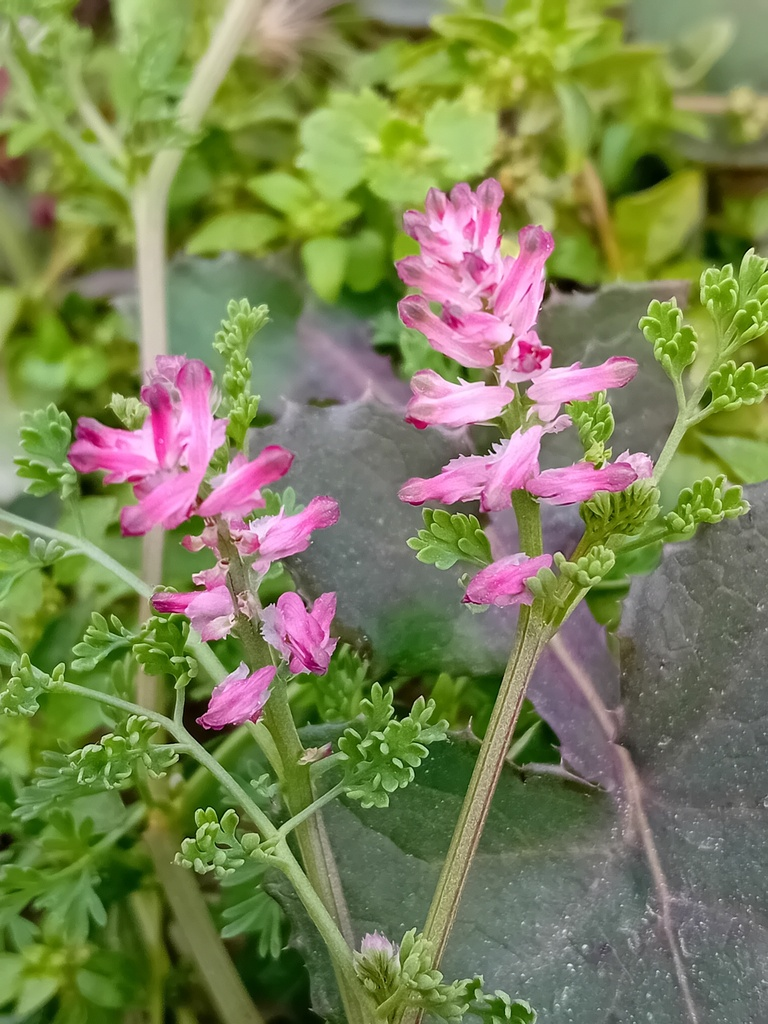

Fumaria densiflora is a species of annual herb in the family Papaveraceae. They have a self-supporting growth form and alternate, one leaf per node, leaves. Leaves can be dissected twice or more.

Individuals can grow to 46 cm tall.

== Habitat ==
The plant grows on garrigue hills or under stone masonry, concrete structures in Mediterranean.

== Sources ==
This article incorporates text from a free content work. Licensed under CC0 (license statement/permission). Text taken from Fumaria densiflora. Encyclopedia of Life.
