= Johan Hinric Lidén =

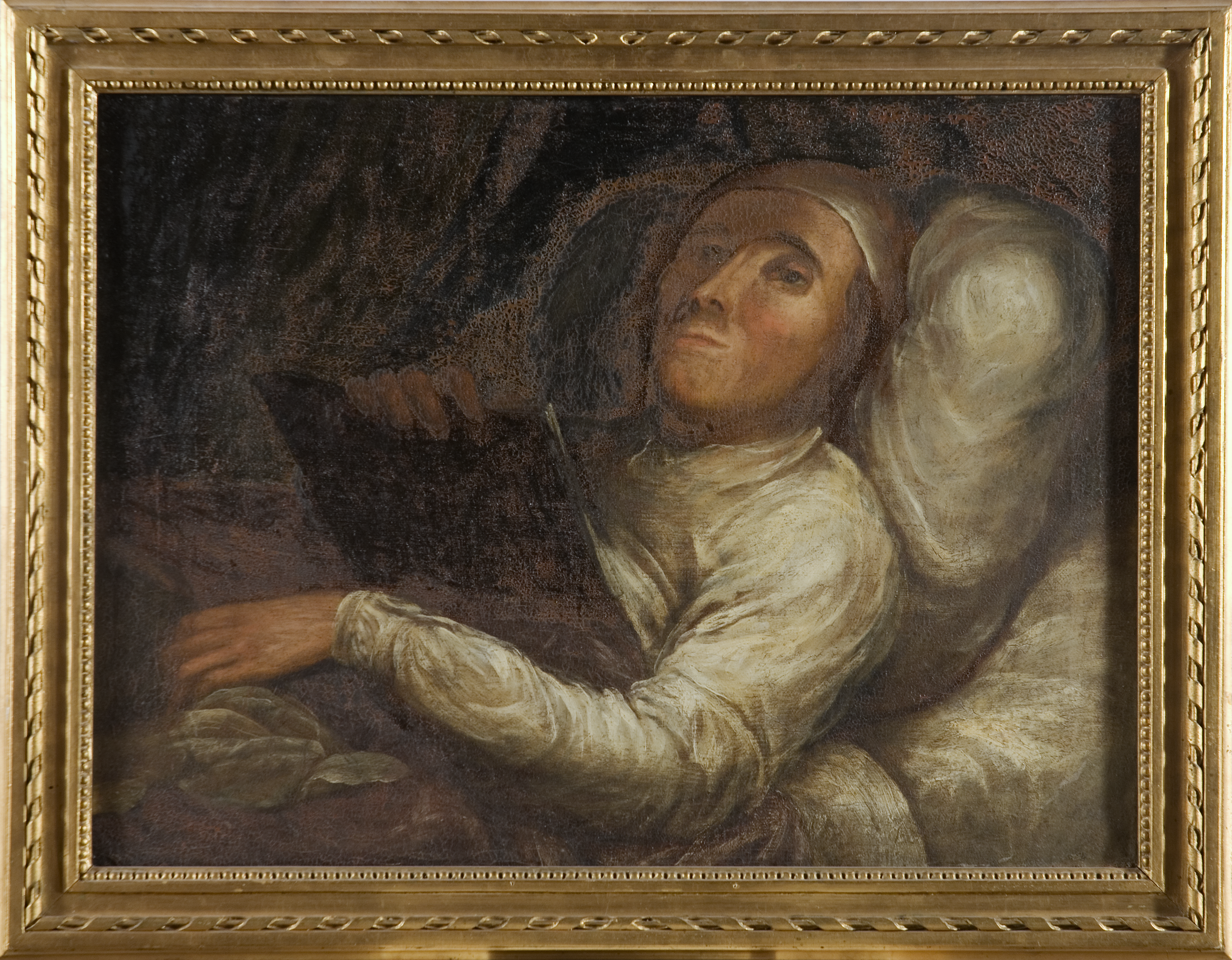
Painting by Pehr Hörberg made in 1792

Johan Hinric Lidén (7 January 1741 – 23 April 1793) was a Swedish scholar, philosopher, bibliographer, humanist, and literature critic. His most famous work was his doctoral dissertation on the history of Swedish poetry and titled Historiola litteraria poetarum Svecanorum (1764).

== Life and work ==
Lidén was born in Slaka parish, Östergötland county, to lecturer of philosophy Martin (1700–1769) and Elisabeth Rydelia (1709–1756). His ancestors had moved from Pomerania and become wealthy. His father had taken the surname from Lida farm outside Norrköping which he developed. His mother was the niece of philosopher bishop Andreas Rydelius. He went to the Linköping Gymnasium and in 1758 he joined Uppsala University. His father married after the death of Elisabeth to a widow of a vicar whose son was Samuel Älf (1727–1799) who was also a docent at Uppsala University. In 1761 he joined the University of Turku and in 1764 he returned to Uppsala University, completing a doctorate in literary history. He travelled around Europe and joined Göttingen University in 1768 (attending the philology classes of J. D. Michaelis) and after leaving in 1769 he joined Lund University where he was appointed associate professor of history. He collected books and theses which grew into a large personal library. He combined ideas from the enlightenment but also had critical views on some of the sciences. In 1771 he suffered from gout and resigned from his position at Lund in 1776. He lived with his friend Johan Kuhlman in Norrköping and was bedridden for the remainder of his life but continued his scholarship. In 1779 he donated his book collection, nearly 11,000 books, to Östgöta nation along with money to support the salary of a librarian. He continued to work on a bibliography of Swedish works in 5 parts. He was visited by the Crown Prince Gustav Adolf and he was a royalist and patriot. He died of pleuroperipneumonia and as per his wish he was autopsied. A modern study of his symptoms suggest that he had untreated rheumatic arthritis that may have been worsened by tuberculosis. He was buried in Hedvig cemetery.
