= Jan Lidén =

Swedish businessman

Jan Lidén (born 1949) is a Swedish businessman and a former chief executive officer of Swedbank, one of Sweden's largest banks. He graduated with a degree in business administration. Lidén started his career at the bank in 1990, working his way up the hierarchy before finally becoming CEO in 2004. He retired from the position in 2009, and was succeeded by Michael Wolf.
