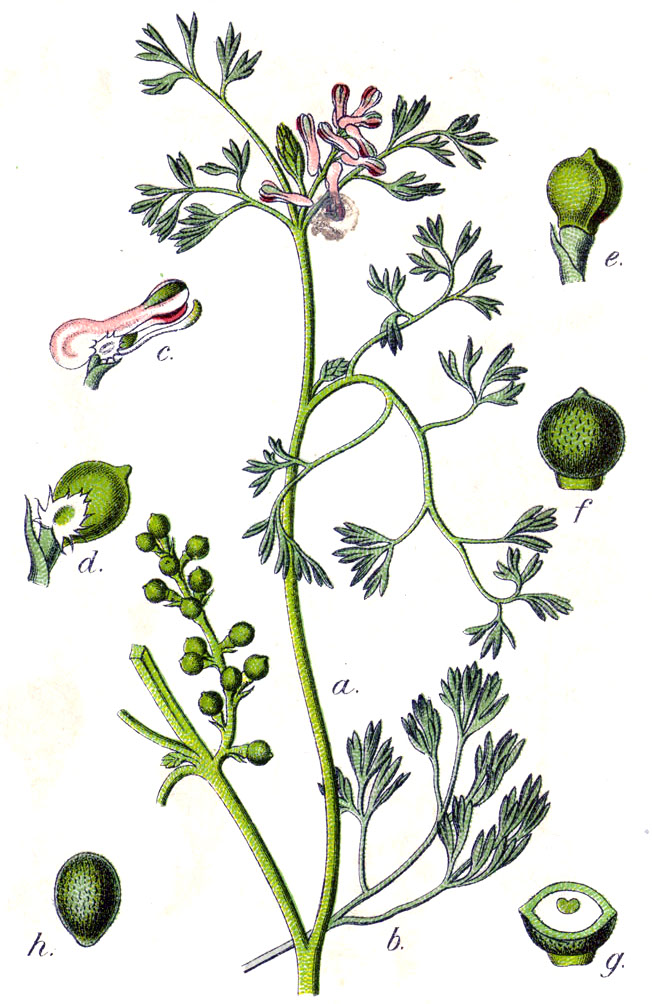

Scientific classification
- Kingdom: Plantae
- Clade: Tracheophytes
- Clade: Angiosperms
- Clade: Eudicots
- Order: Ranunculales
- Family: Papaveraceae
- Genus: Fumaria
- Species: F. parviflora

Binomial name
- Fumaria parviflora Lam.

= Fumaria parviflora =

Species of flowering plant in the poppy family

Fumaria parviflora is a species of flowering plant known by the common names fineleaf fumitory, fine-leaved fumitory and Indian fumitory. It is native to Europe, Asia, and Africa, but it is common and widely distributed in many other parts of the world. It is sometimes weedy. The small flowers are dull white with purple tips. The fruit is a rounded nutlet with a central crest.

Fumaria parviflora was found to have numerous alkaloidal chemical constituents. The major alkaloids isolated from Fumaria parviflora were protopine and adlumidiceine, whereas the minor alkaloids isolated from Fumaria parviflora were parfumine, fumariline, dihydrofumariline, cryptopine, (-)-stylopine, 8-oxocoptisine, sanguinarine, and oxysanguinarine.
