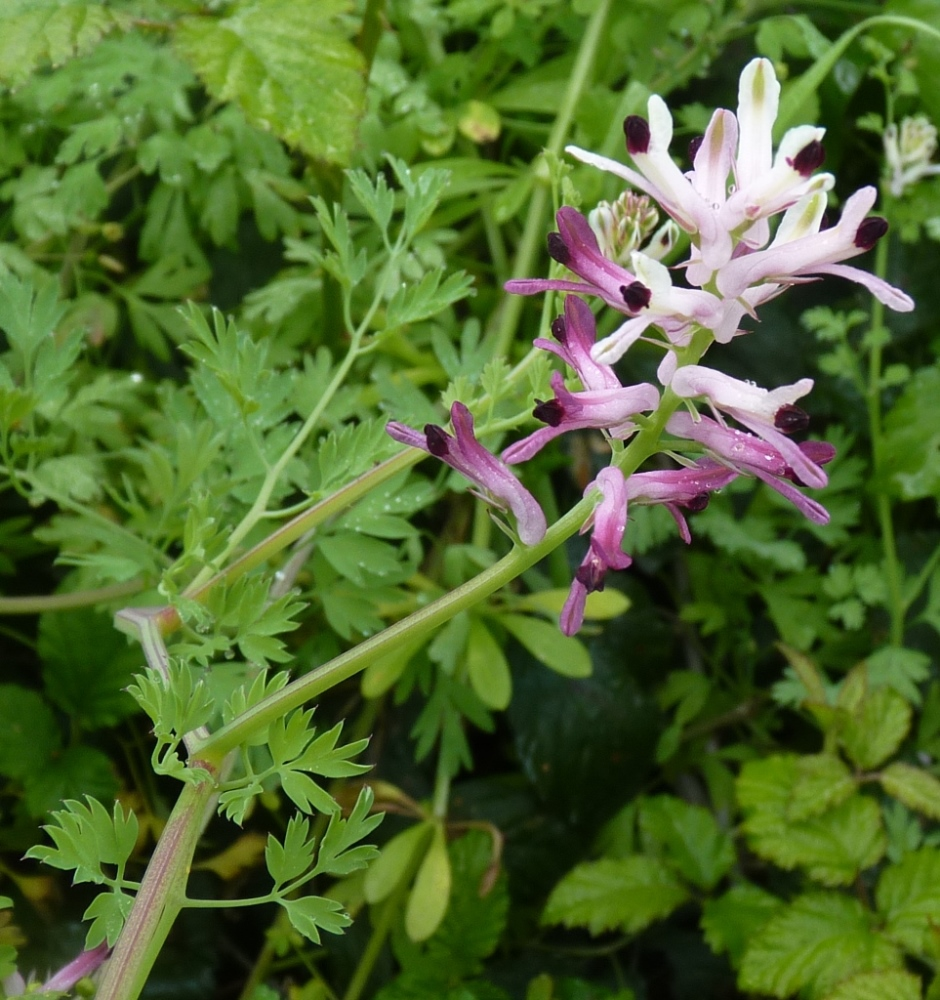

Scientific classification
- Kingdom: Plantae
- Clade: Tracheophytes
- Clade: Angiosperms
- Clade: Eudicots
- Order: Ranunculales
- Family: Papaveraceae
- Genus: Fumaria
- Species: F. agraria

Binomial name
- Fumaria agraria Lag. (1816)

Synonyms
- Fumaria embergeri Pugsley

= Fumaria agraria =

Species of flowering plant in the poppy family

Fumaria agraria is an herbaceous annual plant in the poppy family Papaveraceae. It is native to North Africa and the western Mediterranean Europe, and has been introduced to Chile, Peru, Ecuador, and northern Argentina, where it is now an invasive species.

== Description ==
The leaves are pinnatisect. The sepals measure 3.5–5.5 mm long and 1–2 mm wide, the petals are 12–16 mm long and white to slightly pinkish, with only the inner petals showing dark purple tips. The lower petal has a spreading edge. The fruit of the plant is 2.5–3.5 mm in both length and width.
