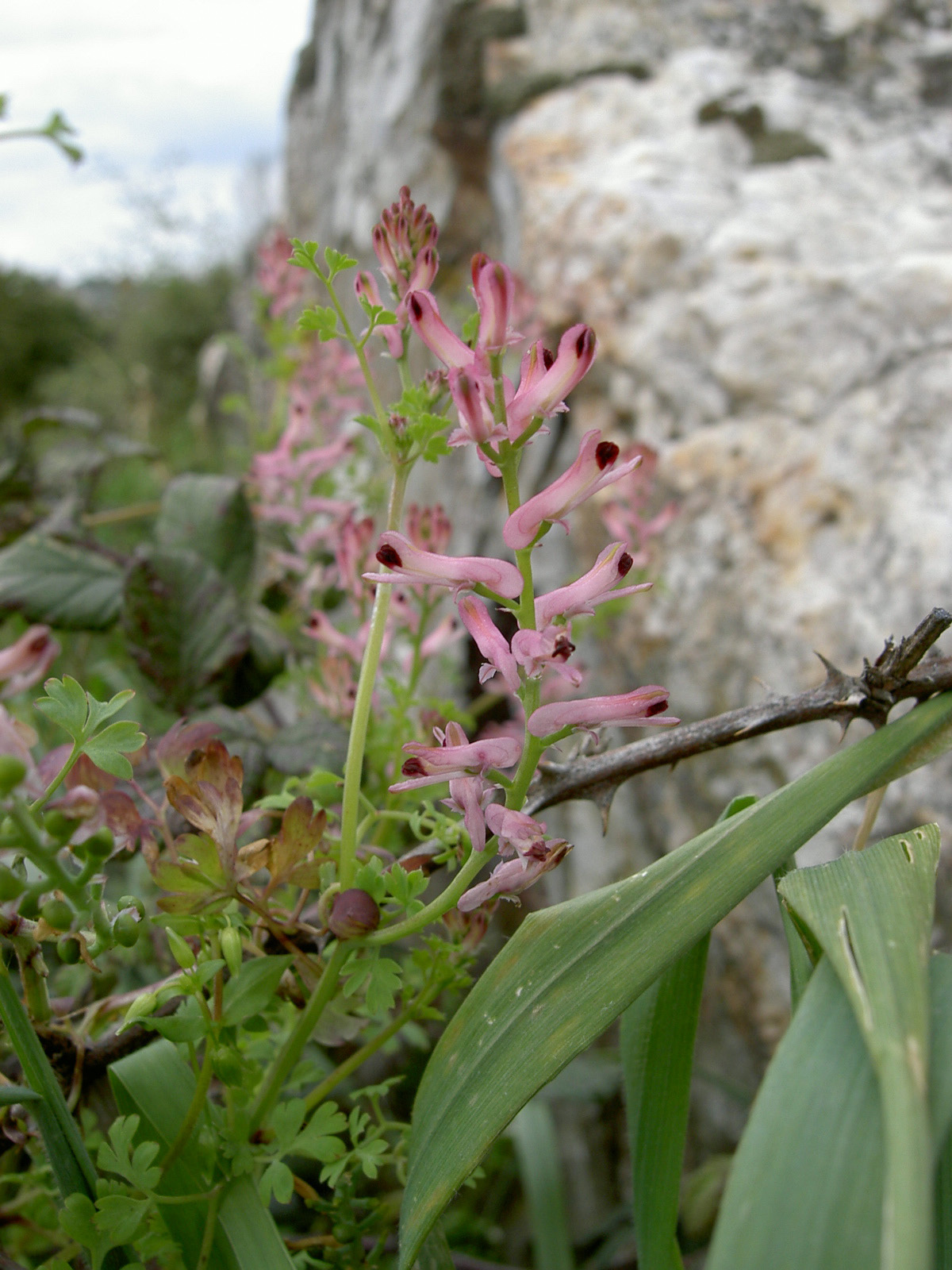

Scientific classification
- Kingdom: Plantae
- Clade: Embryophytes
- Clade: Tracheophytes
- Clade: Spermatophytes
- Clade: Angiosperms
- Clade: Eudicots
- Order: Ranunculales
- Family: Papaveraceae
- Genus: Fumaria
- Species: F. bastardii

Binomial name
- Fumaria bastardii Boreau

= Fumaria bastardii =

Species of flowering plant in the poppy family

Fumaria bastardii, commonly, tall ramping fumitory or bastard's fumitory, is a tall (to 2 m.), many-branched herbaceous flowering plant native to Western Europe including the British Isles and the northern Mediterranean. The species is a weed of arable and disturbed ground, and occurs as an introduced alien in many areas of the world with suitable climates, including Southwest Australia and North America.
