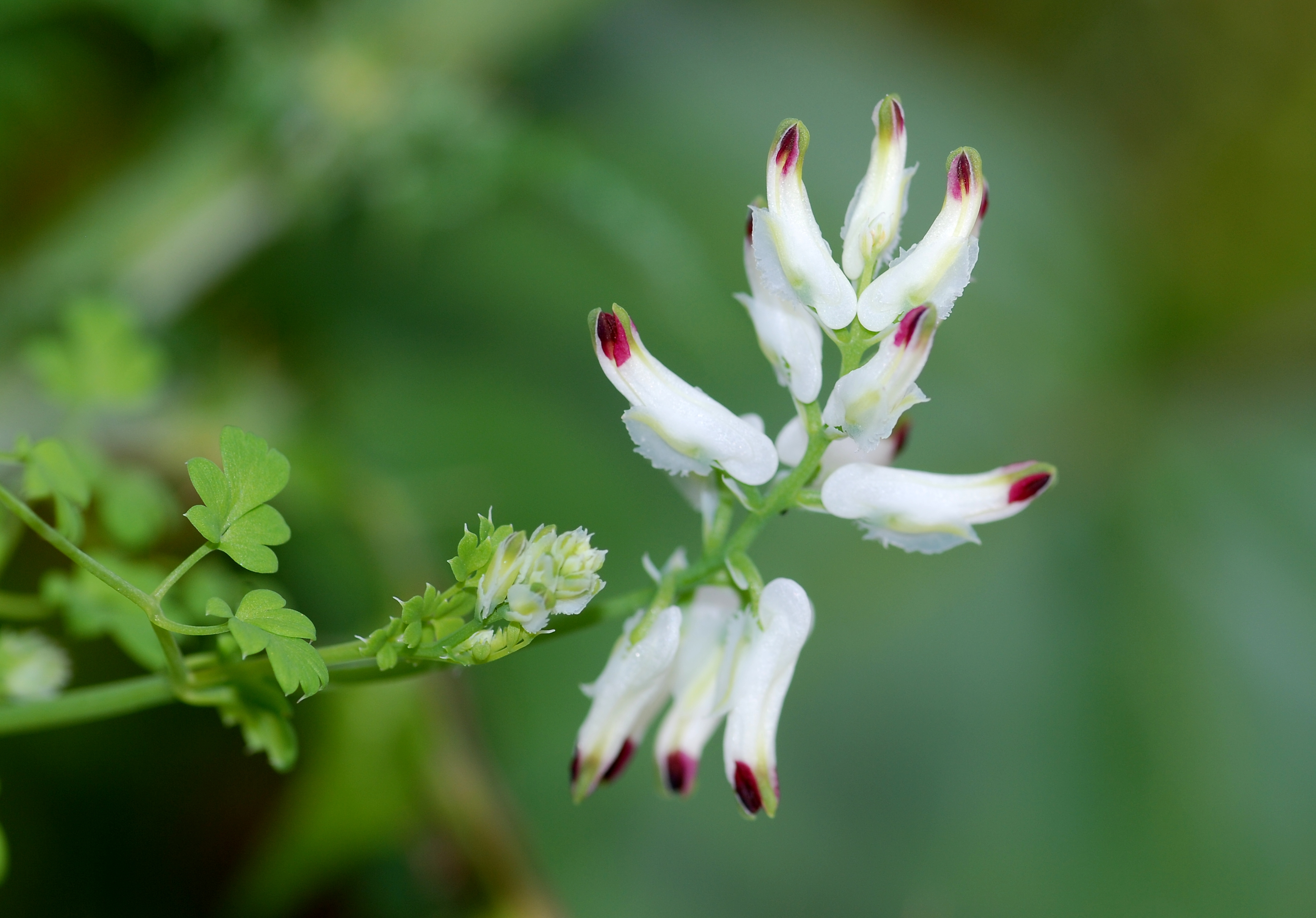

Scientific classification
- Kingdom: Plantae
- Clade: Tracheophytes
- Clade: Angiosperms
- Clade: Eudicots
- Order: Ranunculales
- Family: Papaveraceae
- Genus: Fumaria
- Species: F. capreolata

Binomial name
- Fumaria capreolata L.

Synonyms
- Fumaria officinalis L. var. capreolata (L.) Ewart

= Fumaria capreolata =

Species of flowering plant in the poppy family

Fumaria capreolata, the white ramping fumitory or climbing fumitory, is an herbaceous annual plant in the poppy family Papaveraceae. It is native to Europe, western Asia and northern Africa and naturalised in southern Australia, New Zealand, and southern South America. Common names include also ramping fumitory, white fumitory, and white-flower fumitory.

== Description ==
Plants have stems to 1 metre (3 ft 3 in) long and sometimes climb. The leaves are pinnatisect. Inflorescences comprise up to 20 purple-tipped white to cream flowers that appear in spring and summer. These gradually become pink after pollination.

Unlike other Fumaria species which are known as weeds of crops and agricultural areas, Fumaria capreolata can become naturalised in areas of natural vegetation and smother low-growing plants, becoming an environmental weed.
