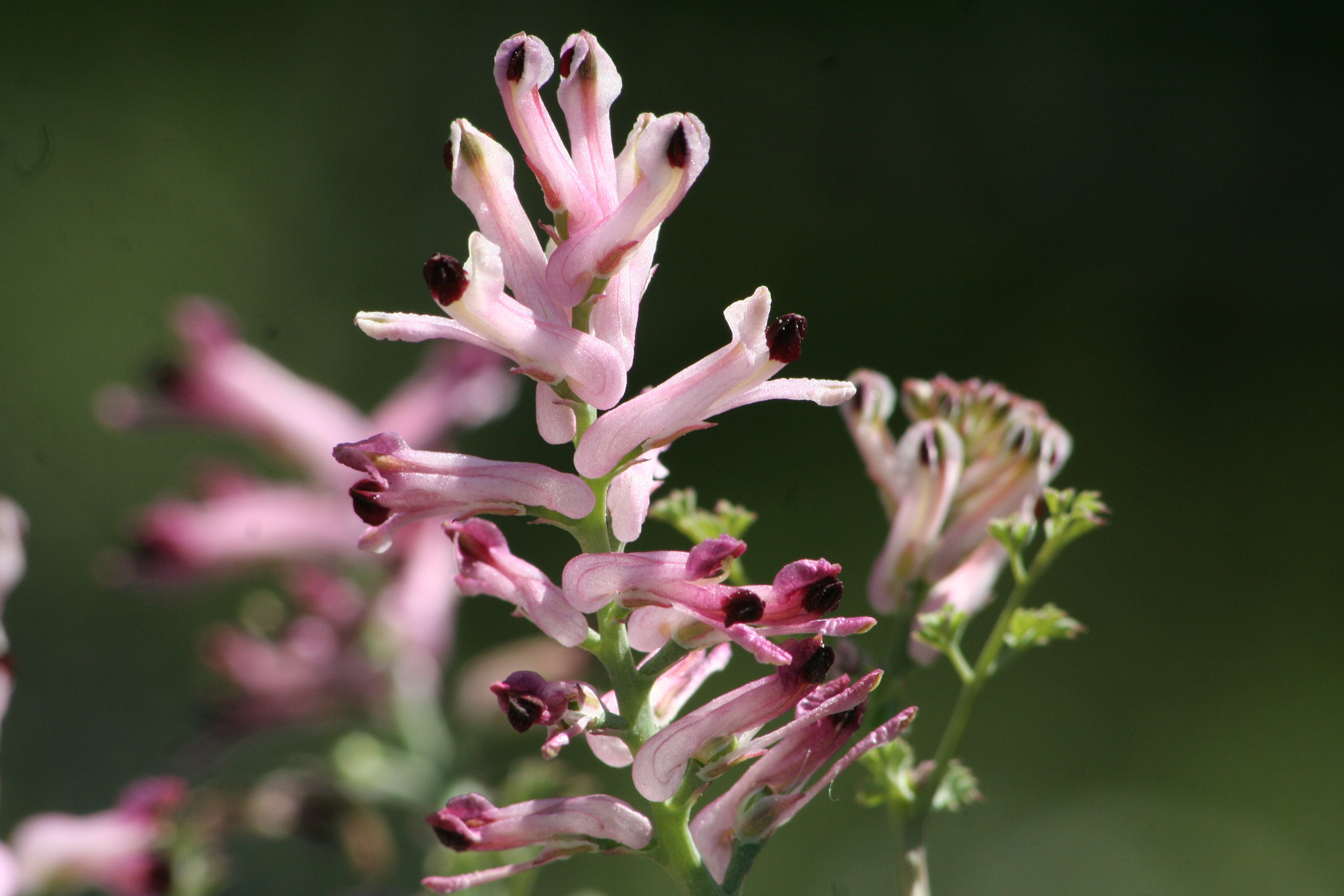
- Fumaria officinalis

Scientific classification
- Kingdom: Plantae
- Clade: Embryophytes
- Clade: Tracheophytes
- Clade: Spermatophytes
- Clade: Angiosperms
- Clade: Eudicots
- Order: Ranunculales
- Family: Papaveraceae
- Subfamily: Fumarioideae
- Tribe: Fumarieae
- Subtribe: Fumariinae
- Genus: Fumaria; L.

Type species
- Fumaria officinalis L.

= Fumaria =

Genus of flowering plants in the poppy family

Fumaria (fumitory or fumewort, from Latin fumus terrae, "smoke of the earth") is a genus of about 60 species of annual flowering plants in the family Papaveraceae. The genus is native to Europe, Africa and Asia, most diverse in the Mediterranean region, and introduced to North America, South America and Australia. Fumaria species are sometimes used in herbal medicine. Fumaria indica contains an unusual mix of alkaloids such as fuyuziphine and alpha-hydrastine. Fumaria indica extracts may have anti-inflammatory and analgesic potential.

== Selected species ==
There are about 50 species:

- Fumaria abyssinica Hammar
- Fumaria agraria Lag.
- Fumaria ajmasiana Pau & Font Quer
- Fumaria asepala Boiss.
- Fumaria atlantica Coss. & Durieu ex Hausskn.
- Fumaria ballii Pugsley
- Fumaria barnolae Sennen & Pau
- Fumaria bastardii Boreau
- Fumaria berberica Pugsley
- Fumaria bicolor Sommier ex Nicotra
- Fumaria bracteosa Pomel
- Fumaria × burnatii Verg.
- Fumaria capitata Lidén
- Fumaria capreolata L.
- Fumaria coccinea R.T.Lowe ex Pugsley
- Fumaria daghestanica Michajlova
- Fumaria densiflora DC.
- Fumaria dubia Pugsley
- Fumaria erostrata (Pugsley) Lidén
- Fumaria faurei (Pugsley) M.Linden
- Fumaria flabellata Gasp.
- Fumaria × gagrica Michajlova
- Fumaria gaillardotii Boiss.
- Fumaria indica (Hausskn.) Pugsley
- Fumaria judaica Boiss.
- Fumaria kralikii Jord.
- Fumaria macrocarpa Parl.
- Fumaria macrosepala Boiss.
- Fumaria mairei Pugsley ex Maire
- Fumaria maurorum Maire
- Fumaria melillaica Pugsley
- Fumaria microstachys Kralik ex Hausskn.
- Fumaria mirabilis Pugsley
- Fumaria montana J.A.Schmidt
- Fumaria munbyi Boiss. & Reut.
- Fumaria muralis Sond. ex W.D.J.Koch
- Fumaria normanii Pugsley
- Fumaria occidentalis Pugsley
- Fumaria officinalis L.
- Fumaria ouezzanensis Pugsley
- Fumaria parviflora Lam.
- Fumaria petteri Rchb.
- Fumaria platycarpa Lidén
- Fumaria pugsleyana (Pugsley) Lidén
- Fumaria purpurea Pugsley
- Fumaria ragusina (Pugsley) Pugsley
- Fumaria reuteri Boiss.
- Fumaria rifana Lidén
- Fumaria rostellata Knaf
- Fumaria rupestris Boiss. & Reut.
- Fumaria schleicheri Soy.-Will.
- Fumaria schrammii Velen.
- Fumaria segetalis (Hammar) Cout.
- Fumaria sepium Boiss. & Reut.
- Fumaria skottsbergii Lidén
- Fumaria vaillantii Loisel.
