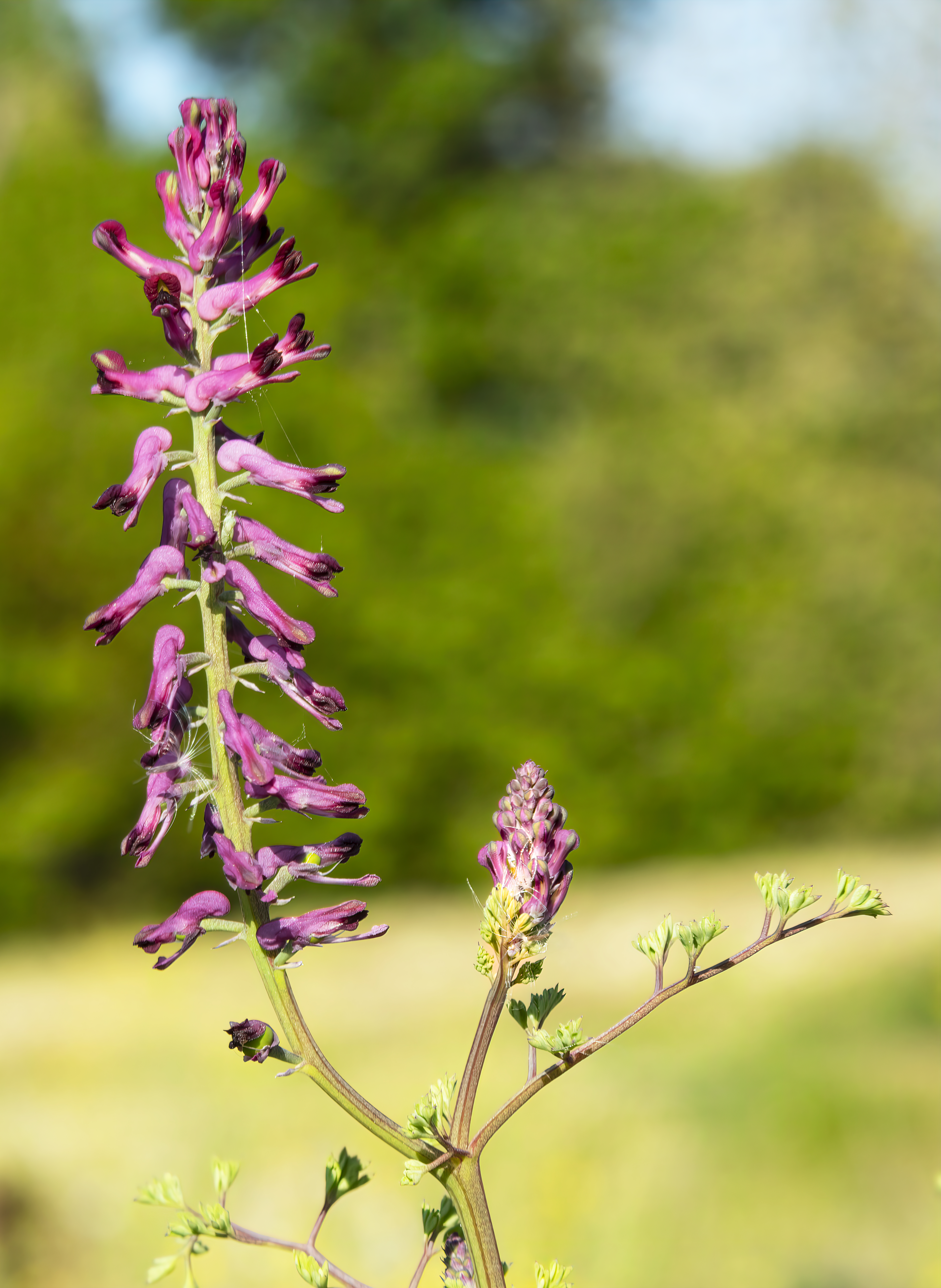

Scientific classification
- Kingdom: Plantae
- Clade: Tracheophytes
- Clade: Angiosperms
- Clade: Eudicots
- Order: Ranunculales
- Family: Papaveraceae
- Genus: Fumaria
- Species: F. officinalis

Binomial name
- Fumaria officinalis L.

= Fumaria officinalis =

Species of flowering plant in the poppy family

Fumaria officinalis, the common fumitory, drug fumitory or earth smoke, is a herbaceous annual flowering plant in the poppy family Papaveraceae. It is the most common species of the genus Fumaria in Western and Central Europe.

== Description ==
It is an herbaceous annual plant that grows weakly erect and scrambling, with stalks about 10–50 cm (3.9–19.7 in) long. It has slender green leaves. Its pink 7–9 mm (0.28–0.35 in) flowers appear from April to October in the northern hemisphere, or May to September in the UK. They are two lipped and spurred, with sepals running a quarter the length of the petals. The plant commonly has more than 20 and up to 60 flowers per spike. The fruit is an achene containing one seed. It is approximately globular, slightly wider than high and with an apical notch. It contains alkaloids, potassium salts, and tannins and is also a source of fumaric acid.

== Taxonomy ==
It was first formally described by the Swedish botanist Carl Linnaeus in his seminal publication 'Species Plantarum' on page 700, in 1753.

There are 2 known subspecies:

- Fumaria officinalis subsp. cilicica (Hausskn.) Lidén
- Fumaria officinalis subsp. wirtgenii (Koch) Arcang.

== Etymology ==
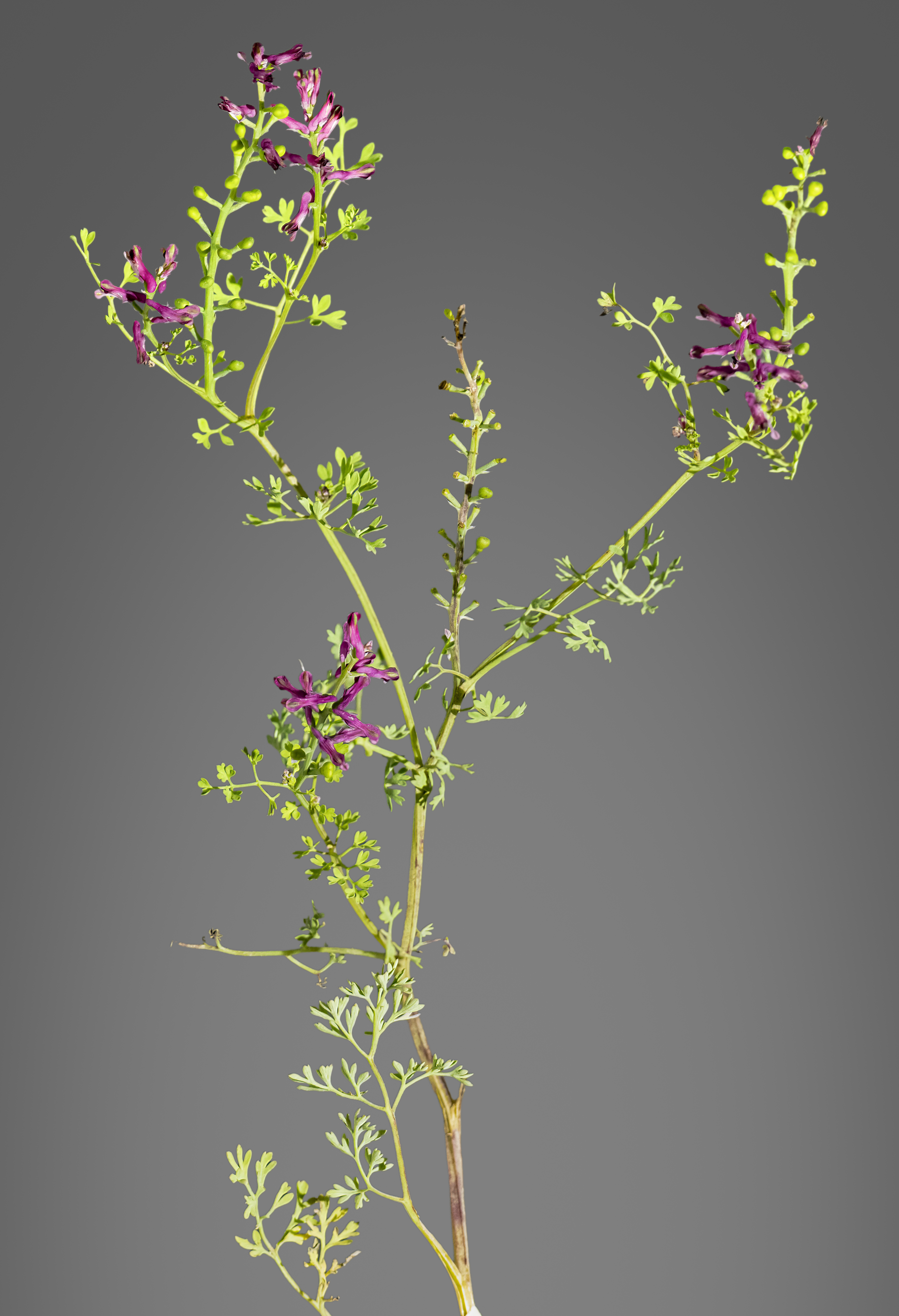
Flower and leaves of Fumaria officinalis

The "smoky" or "fumy" origin of its name comes from the translucent color of its flowers, giving them the appearance of smoke or of hanging in smoke, and the slightly gray-blue haze color of its foliage, also resembling smoke coming from the ground, especially after morning dew.

The plant was already called fūmus terrae (smoke of the earth) in the early 13th century, and two thousand years ago, Dioscorides wrote in De Materia Medica (Περὶ ὕλης ἰατρικῆς) and Pliny the Elder in Naturalis Historia that rubbing the eyes with the sap or latex of the plant causes tears, like acrid smoke (fūmus) does to the eyes. Its Greek name is kapnos (καπνός, for smoke) and the name fumewort now applies mostly to the genus Corydalis, especially the similar looking Corydalis solida (formerly Fumaria bulbosa), which was thought to belong to the same genus as fumitory.

== Distribution and habitat ==
It is native to temperate regions of North Africa, Europe and parts of Western Asia.

=== Range ===
It is found in North Africa, within Macaronesia, Canary Islands, Algeria, Egypt, Libya, Morocco and Tunisia. Within Western Asia it is found in the Caucasus, Cyprus, Iraq, Israel, Lebanon, Siberia, Syria and Turkey. In eastern Europe, it is found within Belarus, Estonia, Latvia, Lithuania and Ukraine. In middle Europe, it is in Austria, Belgium, Germany, Hungary, Netherlands, Poland, Slovakia and Switzerland. In northern Europe, in Denmark, Ireland, Norway, Sweden and United Kingdom. In southeastern Europe, within Albania, Bosnia and Herzegovina, Bulgaria, Croatia, Greece, Italy, Montenegro, North Macedonia, Romania, Serbia and Slovenia. Also in southwestern Europe, it is found in France, Portugal and Spain. It is common in Australia where it was introduced.

== Herbalism ==
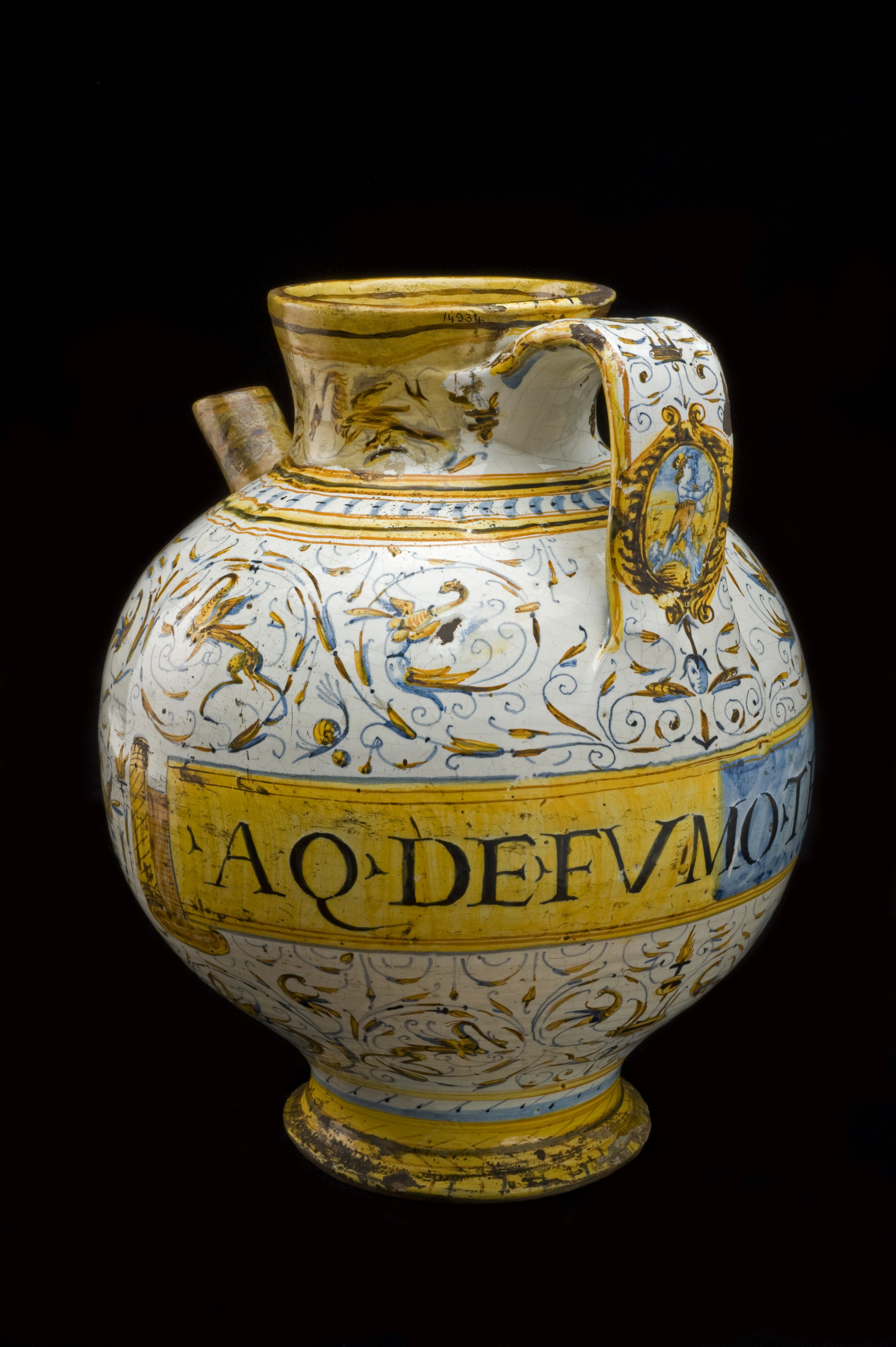
Storage jar used for fumitory water (water infused with Fumaria officinalis), Italy, mid-17th century

Usage of this plant as medicine began in Europe in the late Middle Ages, although it was known since antiquity. In 17th century Europe it was publicised as good for the eyes (due to remarks by Pliny and later Olivier de Serres that rubbing its juice in one's eyes caused excessive tearing). The most common traditional uses were as a digestive aid and a diuretic, but various folk traditions throughout Europe ascribed to it a multitude of uses: constipation, cystitis, arteriosclerosis, rheumatism, arthritis, as a blood purifier, for hypoglycaemia, infections, and possibly to cleanse the kidneys. In Sicily and perhaps elsewhere it was used to treat skin blemishes, and in Britain into the modern era as an eyewash to treat conjunctivitis.

Since 1963, it has been marketed as a herbal medicine in France. As of 2011, herbal products made from this plant are legally sold in various forms in Austria, Germany, France and Spain. Products may be legally sold in the British market (it is on the British General Sales List), although no products were sold there as of 2011. In the European Union as a whole, marketing of the plant is not necessarily legal: it has been rejected from the Community List by the Committee on Herbal Medicinal Products due to the lack of toxicology studies. Products in France and Spain are marketed as a digestive (said to work by increasing bile flow), in Austria it is sold for treatment of dyskinesia of the biliary duct, in Germany it is simply sold as an herbal tea.

There is some evidence from animal models that it modifies abnormal bile flow, although it has no effect on normal choleresis. An antispasmodic effect on the upper digestive tract in vitro and in animal studies is considered sufficiently documented. The efficacy of the herbal products in humans is considered plausible but yet unproven in clinical studies. Numerous clinical studies in its amphocholeretic uses in humans have demonstrated the tolerability and safety of dosages used, but there has only been one small double-blind trial with placebos which was inconclusive regarding efficacy. A larger double-blind trial with placebos investigating and comparing its use in the treatment of pain and distension due to irritable bowel syndrome with Curcuma demonstrated no statistically significant differences between treatment groups (although use of either herb appeared to slightly worsen either distension or pain respectively, compared to placebo use). A number of other potential effects or uses for the plant and its major alkaloid protopine have been researched in vitro or in animal models.

Howard (1987) warns that fumitory is poisonous and should only be used "under the direction of a medical herbalist", but in Europe, no safety problems with its use have been recorded as of 2011. Large doses of protopine in animal models causes excitation and convulsions. Thorough toxicological research on this plant has not been conducted as of 2011. There have been no studies on its safety or effect on pregnant woman, children or elderly.

== Chemical constituents ==
Protopine

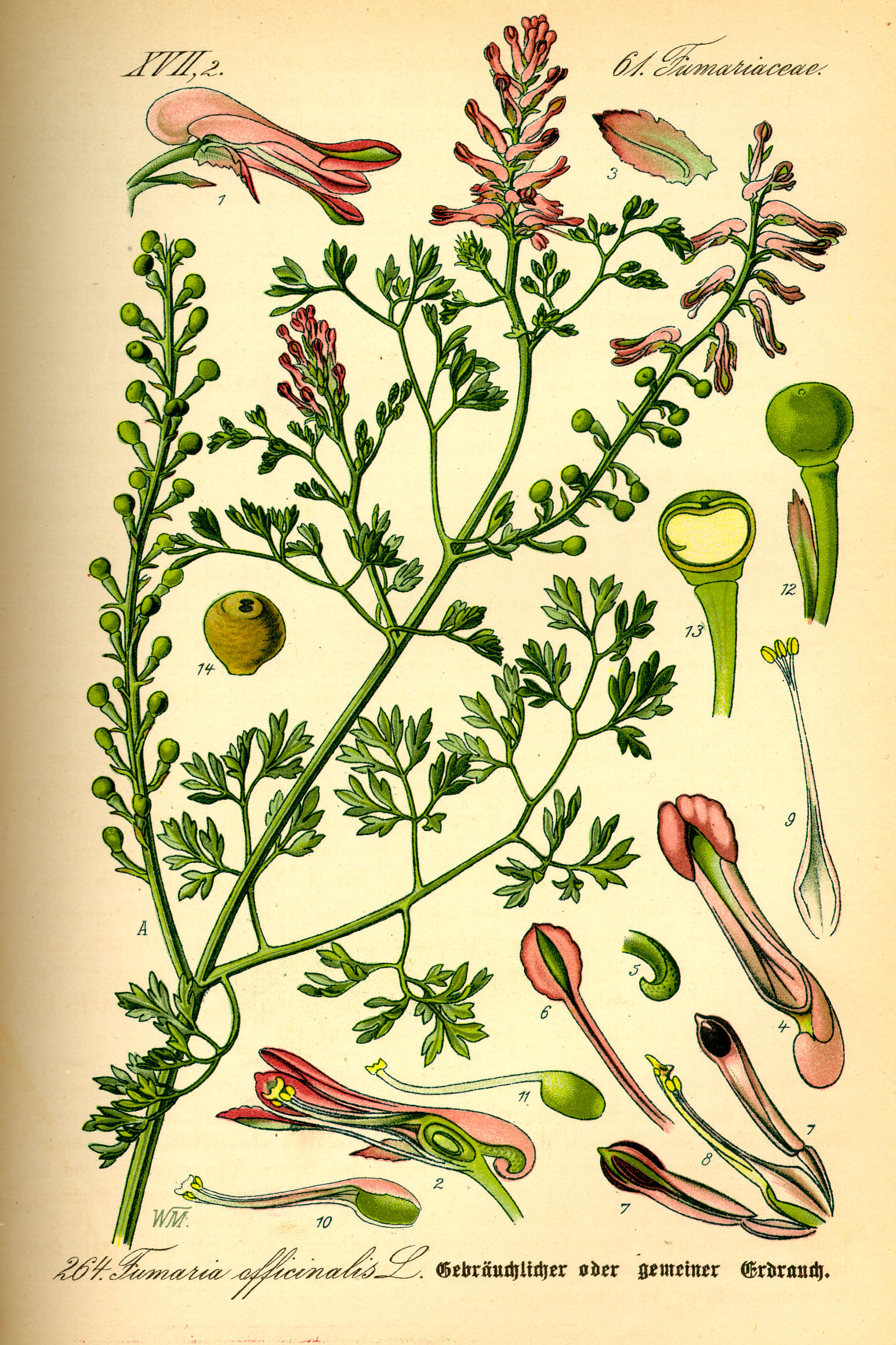
Fumaria officinalis

The plant contains isoquinoline alkaloids protopine and allocryptopine. Both protopine and allocryptopine increased CYP1A1 and CYP1A2 mRNA levels in human hepatocyte cells. The use of products containing protopine and/or allocryptopine may be considered safe in terms of possible induction of CYP1A enzymes.
