= Freesia × kewensis =

Scientific classification
- Kingdom: Plantae
- Clade: Tracheophytes
- Clade: Angiosperms
- Clade: Monocots
- Order: Asparagales
- Family: Iridaceae
- Genus: Freesia
- Species: F. × kewensis

Binomial name
- Freesia × kewensis J.Wright bis

Species of plant

Freesia × kewensis is a species of plant in the family Iridaceae. It is an artificial hybrid between Freesia corymbosa and Freesia leichtlinii subsp. alba.

== Sources ==
This article incorporates text from a free content work. Licensed under CC0 (license statement/permission). Text taken from Freesia kewensis. Encyclopedia of Life.
