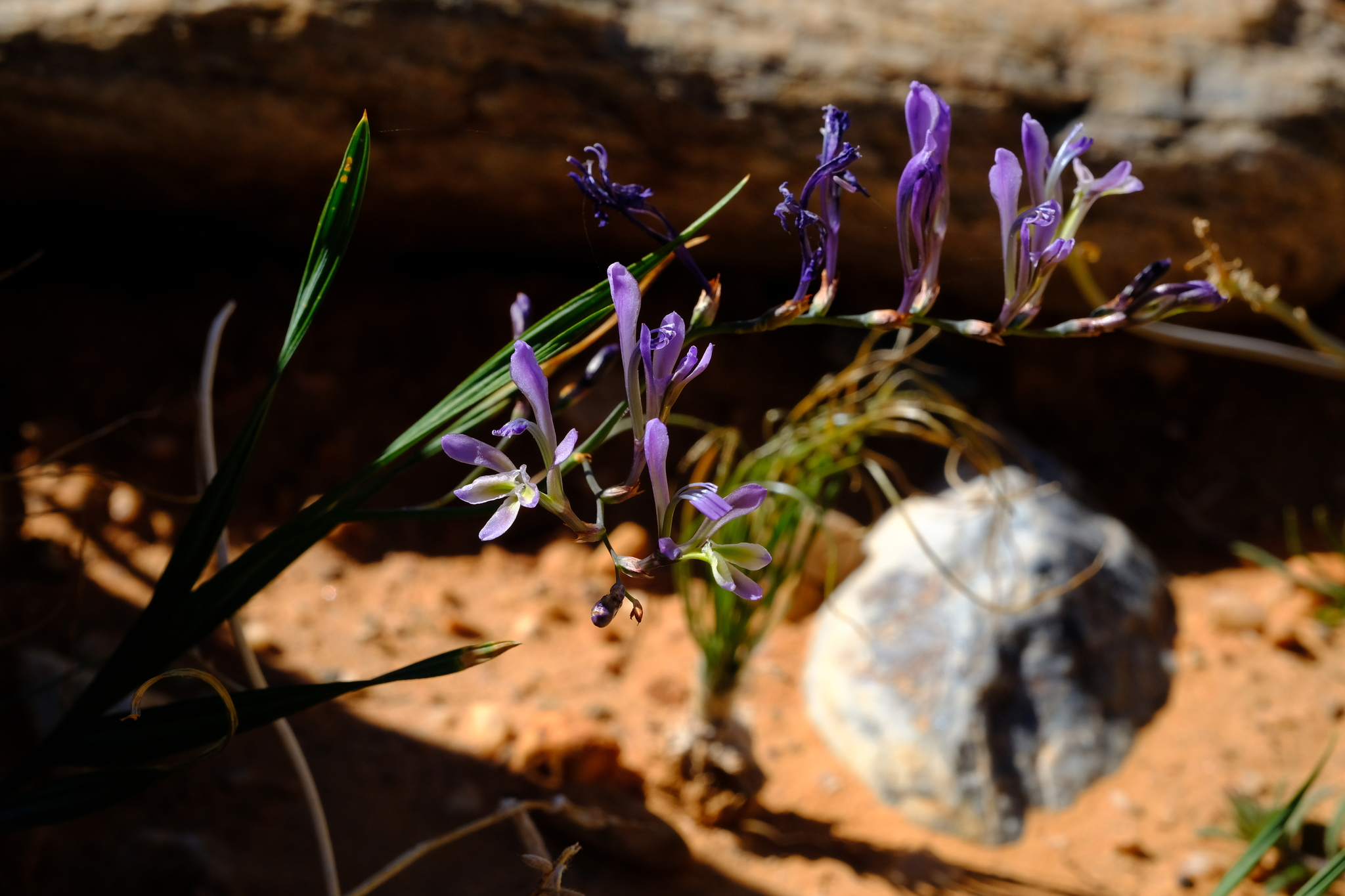

Scientific classification
- Kingdom: Plantae
- Clade: Tracheophytes
- Clade: Angiosperms
- Clade: Monocots
- Order: Asparagales
- Family: Iridaceae
- Genus: Babiana
- Species: B. lobata

Binomial name
- Babiana lobata G.J.Lewis

= Babiana lobata =

Species of flowering plant

Babiana lobata is a species of geophyte of 12–25 cm (4.7–9.8 in) high that is assigned to the family Iridaceae. It has leaves that consist of a sheath and a blade that are at a slight angle with each other. The leaf blades are narrow, sword- to lance-shaped and have a left and right surface, rather than an upper and lower surface. The leaf blades are slightly pleated and hairless. The inflorescence contains seven to twelve bluish mauve mirror-symmetrical flowers comprising six tepals, with the lower lateral tepals yellow sometimes flushed mauve at their tips, and with three stamens crowding under the dorsal tepal. Flowering occurs in July and August. The flowers emit a faint acrid-metallic scent. B. lobata grows in part of the Richtersveld in the Northern Cape province of South Africa.

== Description ==
Babiana lobata is a hairless geophytic perennial plant of 12–25 cm (4.7–9.8 in) high, with conspicuous old dry leaves coiling around its base. The stem is simple or has widely diverging branches. The leaves consist of a sheath that encloses the sheaths of higher leaves and of a blade that is at an angle to the sheath. The leaf blade is slightly twisted, laterally compressed, meaning it has a right and left, rather than an upper and lower side, and its surface is not flat but slightly pleated, meaning that the surfaces of the leaf abruptly and repetitively change angle at the location of one of the prominent veins. The outline of the leaf blade is sword- to narrowly lance-shaped and 2.5–4 mm (0.098–0.157 in) wide. The leaf blades are not coiled, and their tips are pointy and do not end in several irregular teeth.

Each of the flowers is subtended by two bracts of 5–8 mm (0.20–0.31 in) long, green at their base but russet-coloured and dry in the upper third, the outer bract slightly shorter compared to the inner. The inner bract is forked at the tip or at most in the upper third, which is different from many other species that have more deeply forked inner bracts or inner bracts that are split entirely to the base. The inflorescence consists of mostly seven to twelve pale bluish mauve mirror-symmetrical flowers with yellow lower lateral tepals that may be flushed with mauve at their tips, emerging upright from the nearly horizontal branches. The base of each flower consist of a narrowly funnel-shaped tube of 7–8 mm (0.28–0.31 in) long that splits into six unequal tepals. The dorsal tepal is initially upright and later curves backwards in the upper portion, 18–23 mm (0.71–0.91 in) long and 4–5 mm (0.16–0.20 in) wide. The upper lateral tepals remain merged about 5 mm (0.20 in) further with the lower lateral tepals than with the dorsal tepals and the lower lateral tepals remain about 3 mm (0.12 in) further merged with the ventral tepal. The lateral tepals are narrowed acutely into about 2 mm (0.079 in) long claws with conspicuous ear-like, undulating lobes. The three stamens are crowded close to the dorsal petal and consist of approximately 15 mm (0.59 in) long filaments topped by about 4 mm (0.16 in) long, purple anthers, that contain cream-coloured pollen. The ovary is hairless and carries a style that divides into three branches opposite the lower half of the anthers, and are tangled with the anthers. The ovary develops into a flattened, globe-shaped capsule of about 6 mm (0.24 in) high and 7–8 mm (0.28–0.31 in) in diameter.

=== Differences with similar species ===
Babiana spiralis and B. fimbriata that are native in central Namaqualand also have flowers with ear-like lobes at the limb of the lower lateral tepals, but B. fimbriata has leaves that are twisted at the tips, cobwebby lower leaves and bracts of 8–10 mm (0.31–0.39 in) long, and B. spiralis has bracts of 8–10 mm (0.31–0.39 in) long and velvety hairy stems. B. lobata on the other hand is completely hairless, a unique feature among Babiana species, and its bracts are only 5-8 mm long.

== Taxonomy ==
Babiana lobata was described for science by Gwendoline Joyce Lewis in 1959 as part of her revision of the genus, based on the only specimen known at that time, which was collected in 1937 somewhere in Namaqualand by a Ms. Inez Verdoorn.

== Distribution, ecology and conservation ==
Babiana lobata can only be found in the central mountains of the Richtersveld, where it grows on rocky flats and lower slopes including in the vegetation types Central Richtersveld Mountain Shrubland and Vyftienmyl se Berge Succulent Shrubland. It is considered an endangered species, because it occurs in a limited range of about 1,000 km^{2} (390 mi^{2}), in only five known locations where degradation and ongoing habitat loss due to trampling and overgrazing, and the associated erosion results in a declining population.
