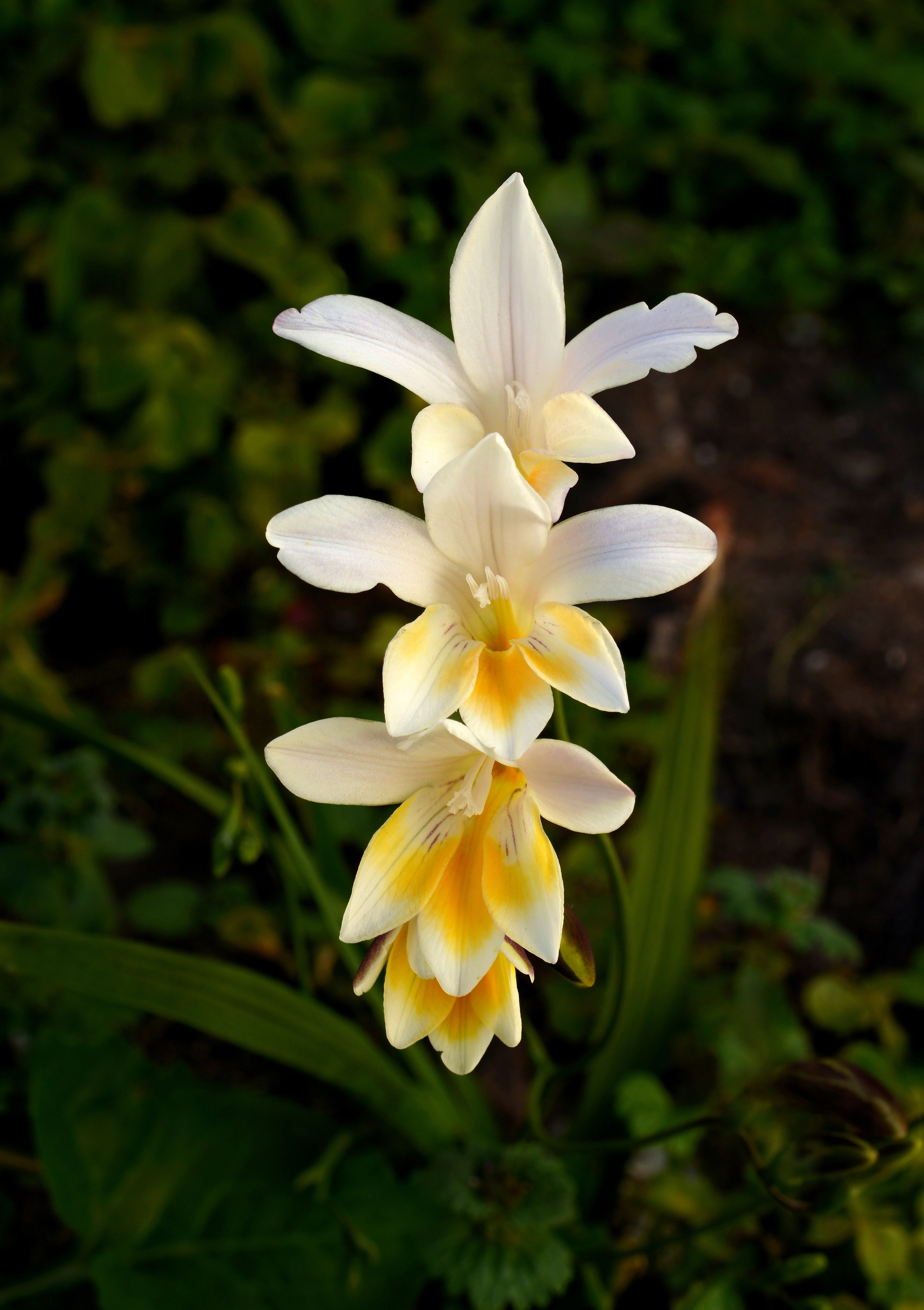

Scientific classification
- Kingdom: Plantae
- Clade: Tracheophytes
- Clade: Angiosperms
- Clade: Monocots
- Order: Asparagales
- Family: Iridaceae
- Genus: Freesia
- Species: F. alba

Binomial name
- Freesia alba (G.L.Mey.) Gumbl.

Synonyms
- Freesia gentilis N.E.Br.; Freesia herbertii N.E.Br.; Freesia leichtlinii subsp. alba (G.L.Mey.) J.C.Manning & Goldblatt; Freesia picta N.E.Br.; Freesia refracta var. alba G.L.Mey

= Freesia alba =

Species of flowering plant

Freesia alba is a species of flowering plant in the iris family. Some sources consider it to be a subspecies of Freesia leichtlinii, F. leichtlinii subsp. alba. It is native to the Cape Provinces of South Africa, but this species and hybrids are known on other continents where they have been introduced. Freesia alba is an herbaceous perennial growing from a corm and producing an erect, often branched stem up to 40 cm (16 in) centimeters tall with several leaves up to about 15 centimeters long. The inflorescence is a spike of several fragrant flowers with usually white tepals marked with yellow and purple.

This plant is grown as an ornamental, and it has been crossed and bred to develop a wide array of variations. Hybrids between F. alba and F. leichtlinii can be found growing naturalized in the wild in many areas, such as several Australian states and Chile.
