= Babiana stenomera =

Scientific classification
- Kingdom: Plantae
- Clade: Tracheophytes
- Clade: Angiosperms
- Clade: Monocots
- Order: Asparagales
- Family: Iridaceae
- Genus: Babiana
- Species: B. stenomera

Binomial name
- Babiana stenomera Schltr.

Species of flowering plant

Babiana stenomera is a geophytic, perennial flowering plant in the family Iridaceae. It grows to a height of 8–12 cm (3.1–4.7 in), has hardly pleated, sword-shaped leaves of about 5 mm (0.20 in) wide and reach about the same height as the flowers. The flowering stem carries five to eight 2-lipped bluish flowers with yellow markings. Flowers open in July. It is known from just one location in Namaqualand, South Africa.

== Description ==
Babiana stenomera is a perennial geophyte of 8–12 cm (3.1–4.7 in) high. The stem is densely covered in hairs towards the tip, short, simple or it may have one or two branches. The only slightly pleated, sword-shaped leaves are 4-5½ mm wide, about as long as the spike of flowers, bald or with few hairs on the veins and the margins of the leaf sheaths. Like in all Babiana-species, each flower is subtended by two bracts, which are in this species 1½-2 cm long, green with brown tips, and with short hairs at their base. The inner bract is split at the tip, sometimes as deep as one third, and has short hairs on the keel. The five to eight bluish flowers with yellow markings on the lower tepals are set in an erect spike. The six tepals that together form the mirror-symmetrical perianth of the flowers are merged in a 12–14 mm (0.47–0.55 in) long tube at their base clustered in two distinct lips. The free part of the dorsal tepal is free part of the 22–24 mm (0.87–0.94 in). The three lower tepals are about 15 mm (0.59 in) long, connected with the higher lateral tepals about 4 mm longer than these are to the dorsal tepal and about 2 mm longer between the lower laterals. The three filaments that are clustered under the dorsal tepal are about 15 mm long and topped by about 6 mm long anthers. The ovary is hairless and the style on its top splits in three branches of about 4 mm long opposite the middle of the anthers.

=== Differences with related species ===
Babiana stenomera looks a lot like Babiana fimbriata that also only occurs in Namaqualand. B. fimbriata however has tapered, narrower leaves of about 3½ mm wide that are slightly twisted towards the tip. In addition, B. fimbriata has a hairless or slightly hairy stem as well as prominent long hairs on the margins of the sheaths.

== Taxonomy ==
This species of bobbejaantjie was first described by Rudolf Schlechter in 1899 and he gave it its current scientific name, Babiana stenomera.

== Distribution, ecology and conservation ==
Babiana stenomera was only known from one collection in the Kareeberg near Nuwerus made by Slechter in 1896 until it was rediscovered at the same location in 2009. It grows abundant there on granitic sand and clay at an altitude of about 380 m (1,250 ft) and the population appears to be stable. It is considered rare.
