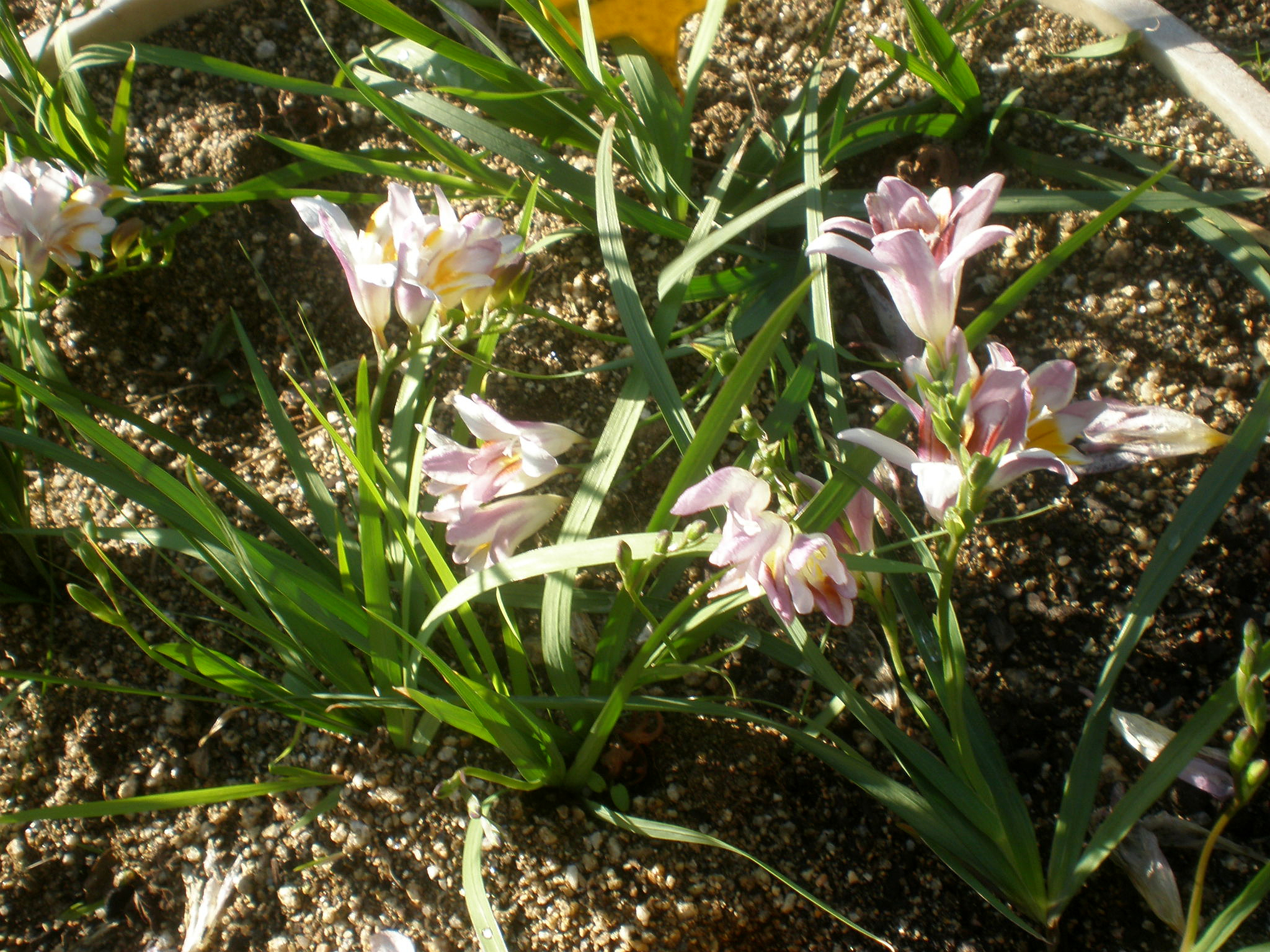

Scientific classification
- Kingdom: Plantae
- Clade: Tracheophytes
- Clade: Angiosperms
- Clade: Monocots
- Order: Asparagales
- Family: Iridaceae
- Genus: Freesia
- Species: F. fucata

Binomial name
- Freesia fucata J.C.Manning & Goldblatt, (2001)

= Freesia fucata =

Species of flowering plant

Freesia fucata is a species of flowering plant in the family Iridaceae. It is a perennial, geophyte endemic to the Western Cape and found only at Villiersdorp. The plant has lost 70% of its habitat to agricultural activities such as the establishment of fruit orchards and vineyards. The process is still ongoing.
