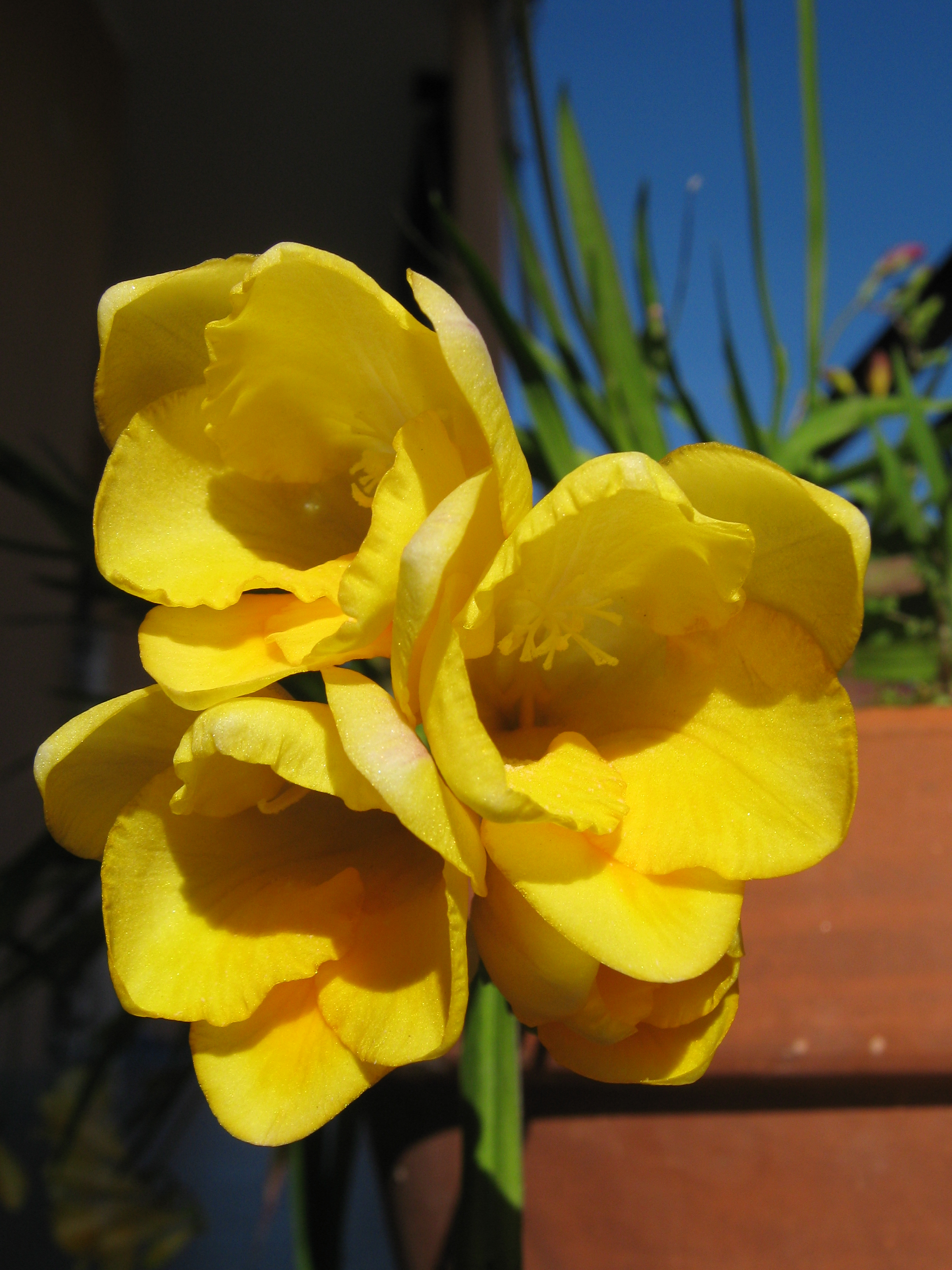

Scientific classification
- Kingdom: Plantae
- Clade: Tracheophytes
- Clade: Angiosperms
- Clade: Monocots
- Order: Asparagales
- Family: Iridaceae
- Genus: Freesia
- Species: F. refracta

Binomial name
- Freesia refracta (Jacq.) Klatt, (1866)

Synonyms
- Freesia hurlingii L.Bolus; Freesia refracta odorata Hovey; Gladiolus refractus Jacq.; Gladiolus resupinatus Pers.; Montbretia refracta (Jacq.) Endl. ex Heynh.; Nymanina refracta (Jacq.) Kuntze; Tritonia refracta (Jacq.) Ker Gawl.; Waitzia refracta (Jacq.) Heynh.

= Freesia refracta =

Species of flowering plant

Freesia refracta is a perennial geophyte endemic to the Western Cape and forms part of the fynbos biome. The plant occurs from Worcester to Gourits River and De Rust.
