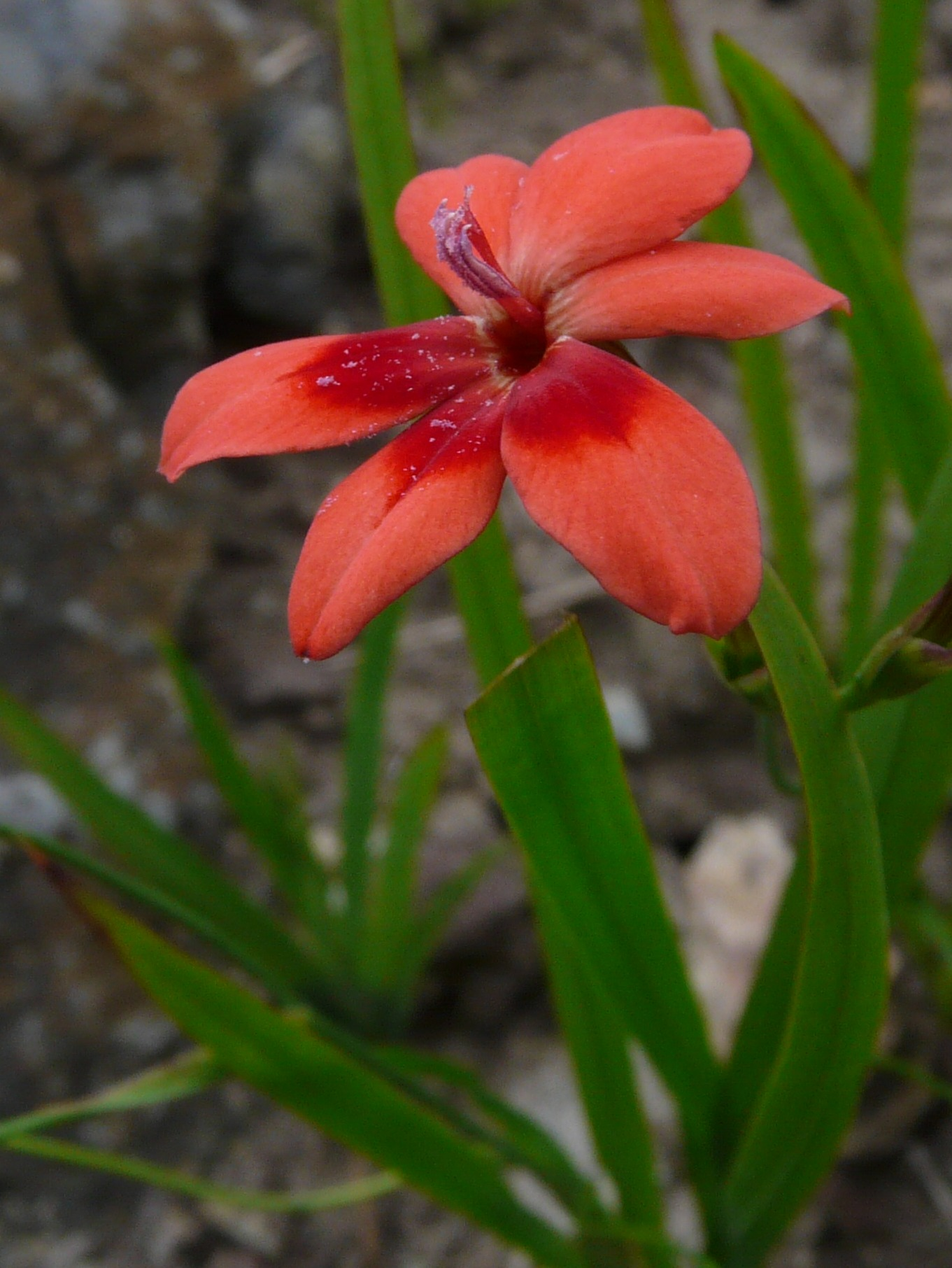

Scientific classification
- Kingdom: Plantae
- Clade: Tracheophytes
- Clade: Angiosperms
- Clade: Monocots
- Order: Asparagales
- Family: Iridaceae
- Genus: Freesia
- Species: F. laxa

Binomial name
- Freesia laxa (Thunb.) Goldblatt & J.C.Manning

Synonyms
- Gladiolus laxus Thunb.; Meristostigma laxum (Thunb.) A.Dietr.; Lapeirousia laxa (Thunb.) N.E.Br.; Anomatheca laxa (Thunb.) Goldblatt; Lapeirousia cruenta (Lindl.) Baker; Freesia cruenta (Lindl.) Klatt.

= Freesia laxa =

Species of flowering plant

Freesia laxa, commonly known as flowering grass, is a small species of cormous flowering plant in the family Iridaceae, from eastern and southern Africa, from Kenya to northeastern South Africa. It is grown in gardens as an ornamental plant.

== Description ==
Freesia laxa grows from corms, reaching about 15–30 cm (6–12 in) tall. The green leaves are arranged in a flat "fan" from which the flower stalk emerges. The flowers are flattened, about 2 cm (0.8 in) across. Their colour varies considerably. The ground colour is red, white or pale blue. The bases of the lowest three tepals usually have a darker marking, which may be red or purple, although it is absent in the pure white form. The seeds are bright red.

It is native to the eastern side of southern Africa, from Kenya to South Africa, where it grows in somewhat moist conditions. It dies down to a corm in the winter, growing again at the end of spring and flowering in summer. In the wild, in the Southern Hemisphere, it flowers between October and December.

== Systematics ==
This small bulbous species has been known by a variety of names. The name Gladiolus laxus was originally published by Carl Thunberg in 1823. Peter Goldblatt transferred the species to Anomatheca laxa in 1971; Nicholas Brown changed it to Lapeirousia laxa in 1928; Goldblatt with his colleague John Charles Manning settled on Freesia laxa in 1995. Separately, in 1830, John Lindley described Anomatheca cruenta which John Baker transferred to Lapeirousia cruenta in 1892. Lindley's plant is now regarded as part of Freesia laxa.

Forms with blue flowers are treated as Freesia laxa subsp. azurea, other forms being placed in Freesia laxa subsp. laxa.

== Cultivation ==
Freesia laxa is sufficiently hardy to be grown outdoors in all but the coldest parts of the British Isles. It requires a light soil and a sunny position. In colder areas, the corms can be lifted and dried off during the winter. It can be propagated by dividing groups of corms or by seed. It can be somewhat invasive through self-sowing when grown in favourable conditions.

Variation in flower colour

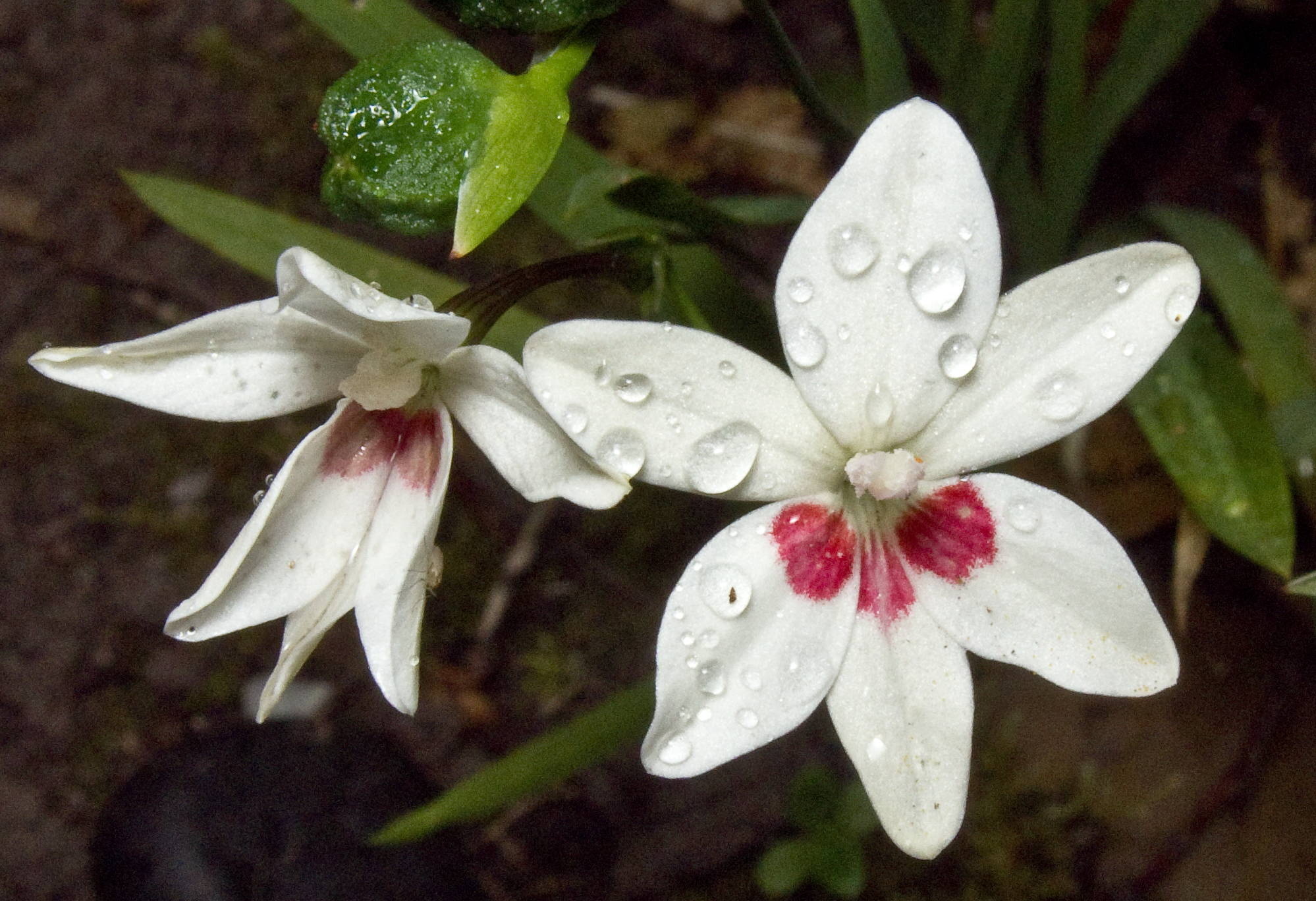
This form is sometimes given the cultivar name 'Joan Evans'

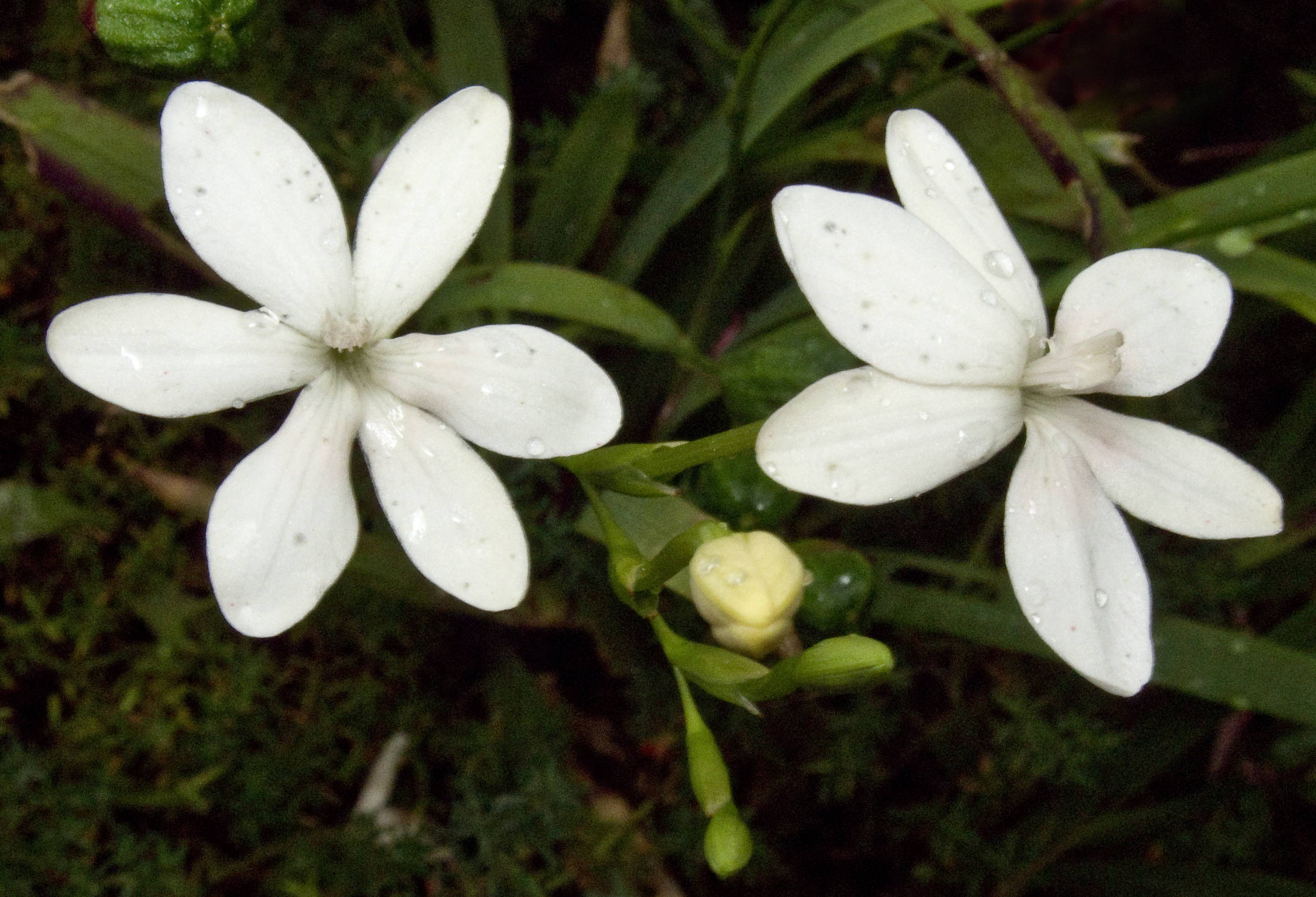
Almost pure white form
