= Freesia marginata =

Scientific classification
- Kingdom: Plantae
- Clade: Tracheophytes
- Clade: Angiosperms
- Clade: Monocots
- Order: Asparagales
- Family: Iridaceae
- Genus: Freesia
- Species: F. marginata

Binomial name
- Freesia marginata J.C.Manning & Goldblatt

Species of flowering plant

Freesia marginata is a species of flowering plant in the family Iridaceae. It is a perennial geophyte native to the Western Cape and is endemic to the Breede River Valley between Worcester and Robertson. The species has a range of only 113 km^{2}. The plant has lost 50% of its habitat to the establishment of olive groves and vineyards. The process is still ongoing.
