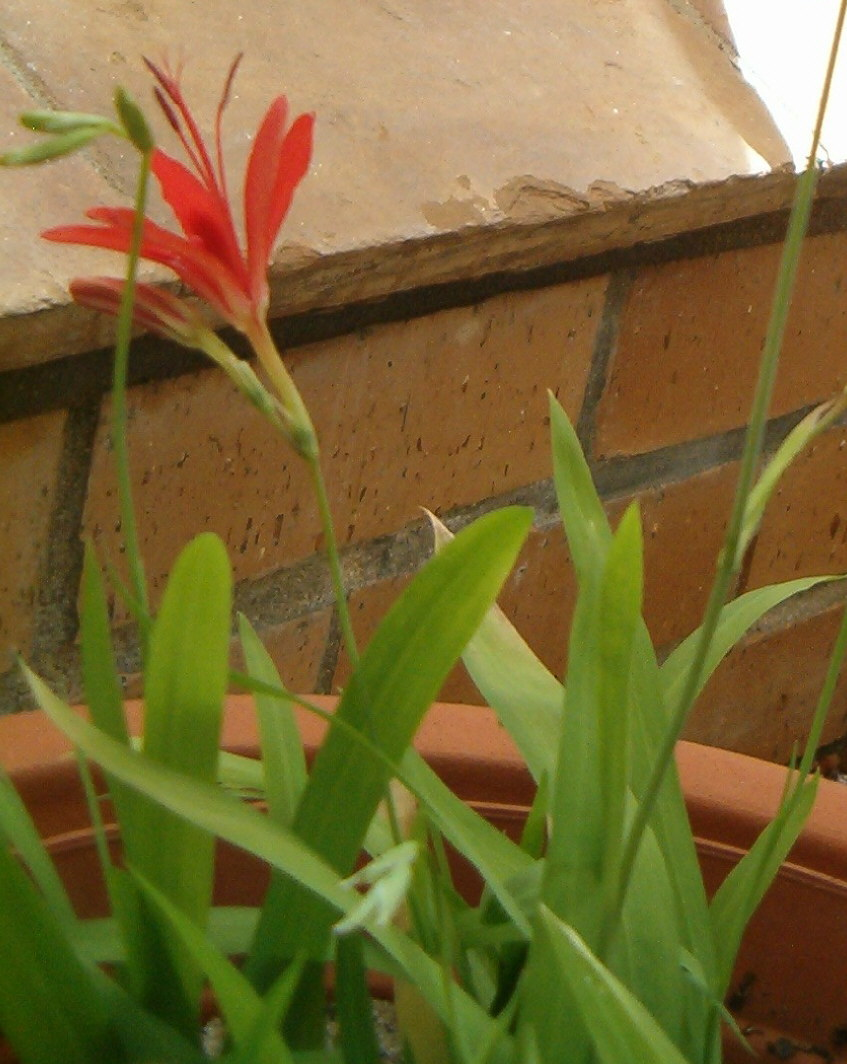

Scientific classification
- Kingdom: Plantae
- Clade: Tracheophytes
- Clade: Angiosperms
- Clade: Monocots
- Order: Asparagales
- Family: Iridaceae
- Genus: Freesia
- Species: F. grandiflora

Binomial name
- Freesia grandiflora (Baker) Klatt, (1894)

Synonyms
- Anomatheca grandiflora Baker; Lapeirousia grandiflora (Baker) Baker

= Freesia grandiflora =

Species of flowering plant

Freesia grandiflora, previously known as Anomatheca grandiflora or Lapeirousia grandiflora, now commonly known as the large-flowered freesia, is a species of flowering plant in the family Iridaceae. Native to Southern Africa, this species is a popular ornamental plant due to its fragrant flowers and attractive appearance.

== Nomenclature ==
The genus Freesia is named after F.H.T. Freese (d. 1876), a German physician from Kiel, Germany and a pupil of C. F. Ecklon, who first used the term. The species name grandiflora derives from Latin, meaning “large-flowered”.

== Description ==
Freesia grandiflora is a perennial, deciduous geophyte that typically reaches a height of 12 to 60 cm (12 to 18 inches). Each flower has six tepals, with the lower three forming the tube-like structure, while the upper three are broader and spread outward. The flower stalk is upright and generally unbranched, although it can sometimes have at most four branches. Freesia grandiflora flowers mainly in summer.

== Distribution and habitat ==
Freesia grandiflora is native to the coastal regions of South Africa, specifically the Western Cape and Eastern Cape provinces, from Durban to the Soutpansberg mountain range. Outside of South Africa, the species can be found in the Democratic Republic of the Congo, Eswatini, Malawi, Mozambique, Tanzania, Zambia and Zimbabwe. The species grows in the Mediterranean-type climate of the region, with mild, wet winters and hot, dry summers. Freesia grandiflora is commonly found in rocky slopes and grasslands.

== See also ==
- Freesia (genus)
- Iridaceae (family)
- Ornamental plants
