= Freesia viridis =

Scientific classification
- Kingdom: Plantae
- Clade: Tracheophytes
- Clade: Angiosperms
- Clade: Monocots
- Order: Asparagales
- Family: Iridaceae
- Genus: Freesia
- Species: F. viridis

Binomial name
- Freesia viridis (Aiton) Goldblatt & J.C.Manning

Varieties
- See here

Synonyms
- List: Anomatheca viridis (Aiton) Goldblatt; Gladiolus viridis Aiton; Lapeirousia viridis (Aiton) L.Bolus; Montbretia viridis (Aiton) Voigt; Tapeinia viridis (Aiton) F.Dietr.; Tritonia viridis (Aiton) Ker Gawl.; Waitzia viridis (Aiton) Kreysig in Verz. Warm. & Kalt.

Species of flowering plant

Freesia viridis is a perennial, geophyte endemic to the Northern Cape and the Western Cape. The species occurs from Hondeklip Bay to Bok Bay. The plant has lost its habitat to urban development.

Flowering Freesia viridis

== Taxonomy ==
It was first described as Gladiolus viridis Aiton by William Aiton in 1789. It was moved to the genus Freesia Eckl. ex Klatt as Freesia viridis (Aiton) Goldblatt & J.C.Manning by Peter Goldblatt and John Charles Manning in 1995.

=== Etymology ===
The specific epithet viridis means green.

=== Varieties ===
It has two varieties:

- Freesia viridis subsp. crispifolia (Goldblatt) J.C.Manning & Goldblatt
- Freesia viridis subsp. viridis
