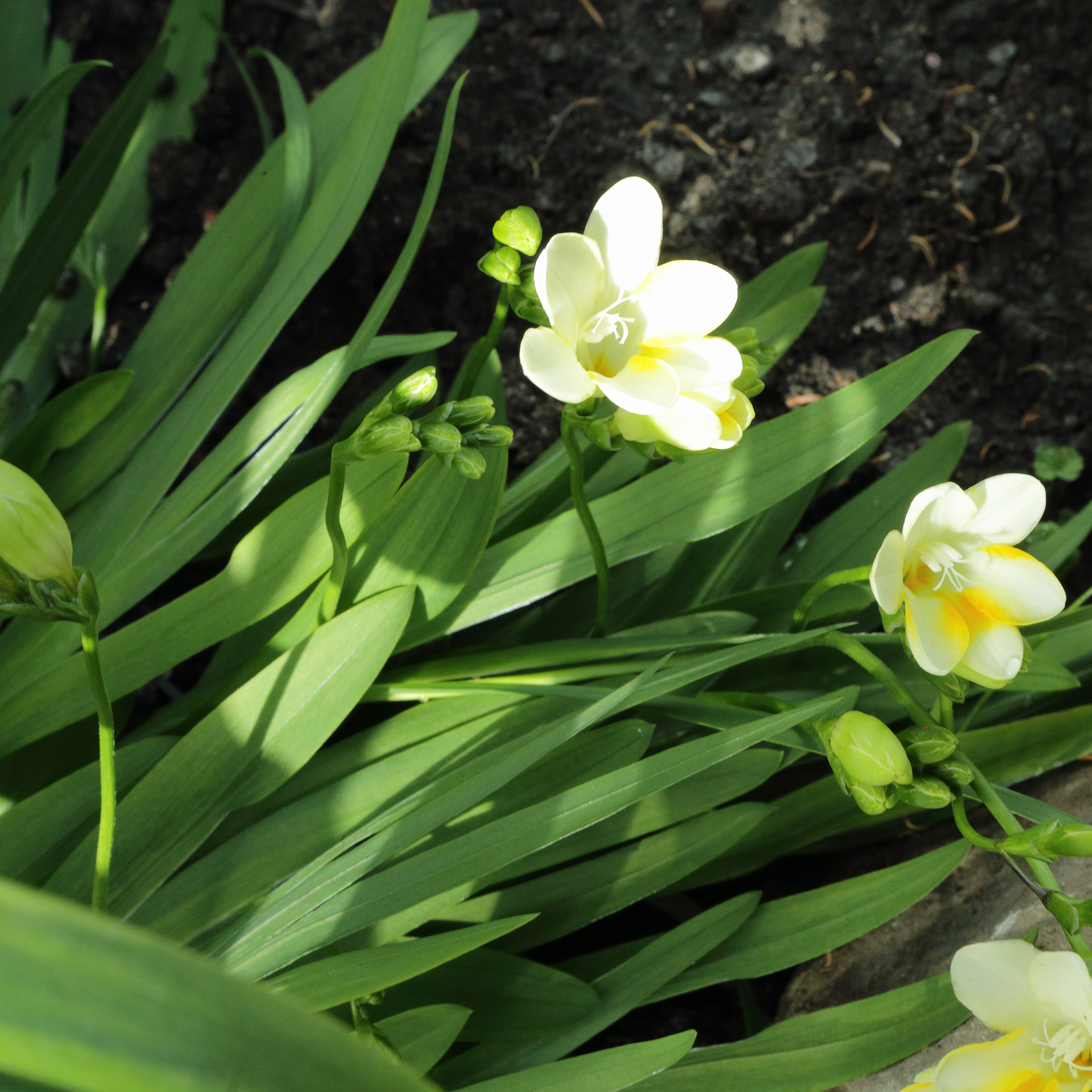

Scientific classification
- Kingdom: Plantae
- Clade: Tracheophytes
- Clade: Angiosperms
- Clade: Monocots
- Order: Asparagales
- Family: Iridaceae
- Genus: Freesia
- Species: F. fergusoniae

Binomial name
- Freesia fergusoniae L.Bolus, (1927)

= Freesia fergusoniae =

Species of flowering plant

Freesia fergusoniae is a perennial, geophyte endemic to the Western Cape and forms part of the fynbos. The species occurs from Swellendam to Oudtshoorn and Mossel Bay. The plant has lost more than 70% of its habitat to agricultural activities and the remaining populations are fragmented as a result. Habitat loss continues.
