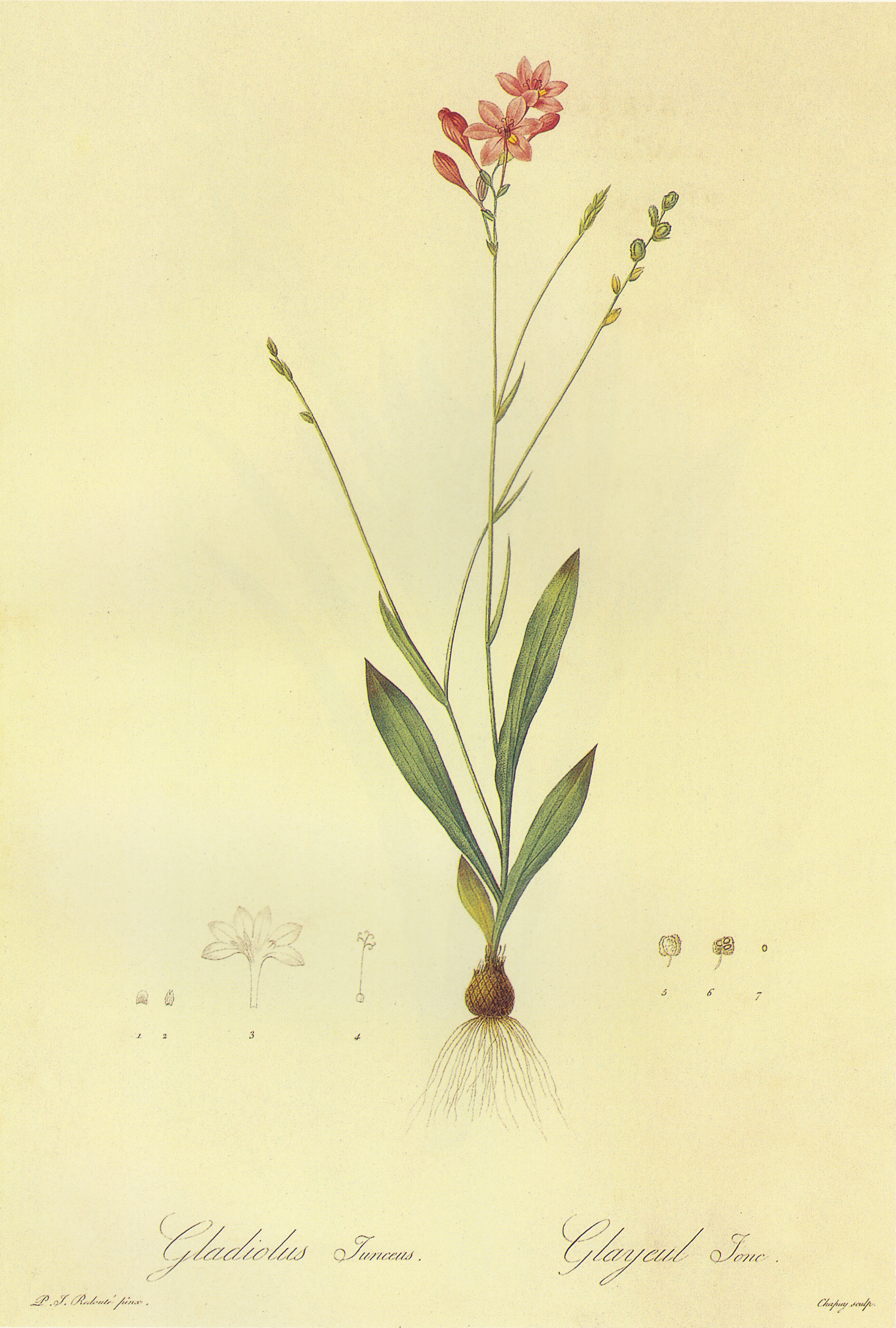

Scientific classification
- Kingdom: Plantae
- Clade: Tracheophytes
- Clade: Angiosperms
- Clade: Monocots
- Order: Asparagales
- Family: Iridaceae
- Genus: Freesia
- Species: F. verrucosa

Binomial name
- Freesia verrucosa (Vogel) Goldblatt & J.C.Manning, (1995)

Synonyms
- Anomatheca juncea (Pourr.) Ker Gawl.; Anomatheca verrucosa (B.Vogel) Goldblatt; Freesia juncea (Pourr.) Klatt; Gladiolus amabilis Salisb.; Gladiolus excisus Jacq.; Gladiolus junceus L.f.; Gladiolus paniculatus Pers.; Gladiolus polystachyus Andrews; Gladiolus pulchellus Salisb.; Ixia elliptica Thunb.; Ixia emarginata Lam.; Ixia gawleri Schrad.; Ixia verrucosa B.Vogel; Lapeirousia juncea Pourr.; Meristostigma junceum (Pourr.) Steud.; Peyrousia juncea (Pourr.) Poir.

= Freesia verrucosa =

Species of flowering plant

Freesia verrucosa is a perennial geophyte endemic to the Eastern Cape and the Western Cape. It occurs from Ladismith to Willowmore, the Langkloof and Kareedouw and is part of the fynbos biome.
