= Freesia sparrmanii =

Scientific classification
- Kingdom: Plantae
- Clade: Tracheophytes
- Clade: Angiosperms
- Clade: Monocots
- Order: Asparagales
- Family: Iridaceae
- Genus: Freesia
- Species: F. sparrmanii

Binomial name
- Freesia sparrmanii (Thunb.) N.E.Br., (1921)

Synonyms
- Gladiolus sparrmanii Thunb.; Ixia sparrmannii (Thunb.) Schult.; Meristostigma sparmannii (Thunb.) Steud.

Species of flowering plant

Freesia sparrmanii is a perennial geophyte endemic to the Western Cape and occurs in the foothills of the Langeberg near Grootvadersbosch. The plant has an area of occurrence of less than 10 km^{2} and is considered rare. The plant is not currently threatened.
