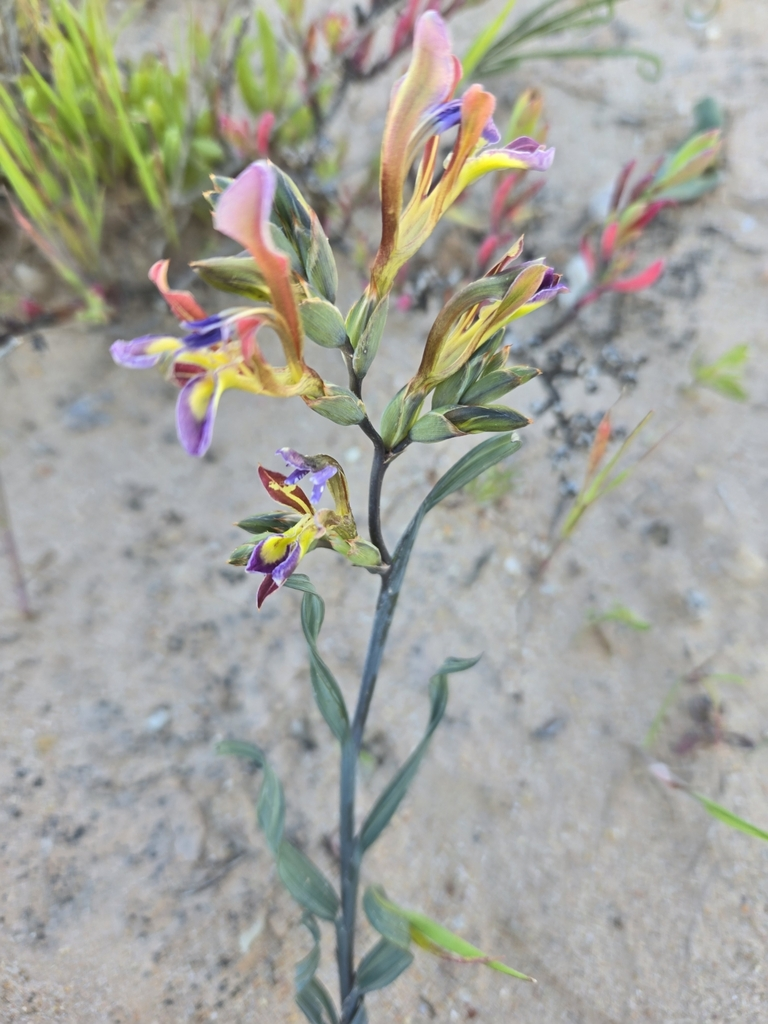

Scientific classification
- Kingdom: Plantae
- Clade: Tracheophytes
- Clade: Angiosperms
- Clade: Monocots
- Order: Asparagales
- Family: Iridaceae
- Genus: Babiana
- Species: B. spiralis

Binomial name
- Babiana spiralis Baker

= Babiana spiralis =

Species of flowering plant

Babiana spiralis or coil-leaf Bobbejaantjie is a perennial flowering plant and geophyte belonging to the Iridaceae. Flowering plants are mostly between 25–55 cm (9.8–21.7 in) high, with an erect stem with usually two to six branches and velvety hairhy. It has narrowly lance- to line-shaped, pleated leaves. It has strongly mirror-symmetrical, pink to mauve-blue and yellow flowers, smelling of Freesia.

== Description ==
The coil-leaf Bobbejaantjie stands about 25–55 cm (9.8–21.7 in) tall. Its stem grows straight up, usually splitting into 2 to 6 branches, and is covered in very short, soft fuzzy hairs. The very narrow, grass-like leaves are only about 1.5 to 2.5 millimetres wide. These leaves have parallel folds like an accordion, twist and curl towards their tip and often have a clear stalk-like base up to 4 cm long. The veins and edges are rough to the touch, and the base of the leaf has long hairs rather than a web-like fuzz. Every flower is subtended by two, gradually tapering bracts that are green at the bottom, but the top third is dry, with few tiny hairs or stiff and bristly down the middle of their lower half. The outer bract is 8–10 mm (0.31–0.39 in) long. The inner bract is somewhat shorter and split from the top to about half of its length. The pink to mauve-blue flowers are strongly mirror-symmetrical sit with five to eight on the upright stem and have a strong smell reminiscent of Freesia. The perianth is merged to form a funnel-shaped tube of 8-10 mm long, before splitting into six unequal tepals that are narrow at base before becoming wider. The dorsal tepal is 18-21 mm long, is eventually arched, later stretches to an erect posture. The upper lateral tepals are merged with the lower lateral tepals about 4 mm further towards the tip than with the dorsal tepal. The lower tepals are yellow with pink or mauve tips that suddenly become wider with ear-like lobes. The three stamens cluster under the dorsal tepal and each consist of an arched filament of about 15 mm long topped by an anther of 4 mm long. The ovary is hairless and the style on its top splits in three spreading branches of about 3 mm long opposite the middle of the anthers. Flowers open in August and September.

== Taxonomy ==
The British botanist and keeper of the herbarium at Kew John Gilbert Baker was the first to describe the coil-leaf bobbejaantjie in 1892 in his Handbook of the Irideae, and he gave it the name Babiana spiralis.

== Distribution, ecology and conservation ==
The coil-leaf Bobbejaantjie is found in the Western and Northern Cape provinces of South Africa, between Garies and Hondeklipbaai in the north to the Olifants River valley. Here, it grows on red sands and stony granite hills. This species is very common particularly between Kotzesrus and Hondeklipbaai and the hilly countryside around Garies. Land conversion in this area is very limited and no major threats have been identified for this species. It's continued survival is therefore considered of least concern.
