= Freesia speciosa =

Scientific classification
- Kingdom: Plantae
- Clade: Tracheophytes
- Clade: Angiosperms
- Clade: Monocots
- Order: Asparagales
- Family: Iridaceae
- Genus: Freesia
- Species: F. speciosa

Binomial name
- Freesia speciosa L.Bolus, (1929)

Synonyms
- Freesia flava (E.Phillips & N.E.Br.) N.E.Br.; Freesia sparrmanii var. flava E.Phillips & N.E.Br.

Species of flowering plant

Freesia speciosa is a perennial, geophyte endemic to the Western Cape and occurs from Anysberg to Calitzdorp. The species has a range of 900 km^{2} and the total population is estimated at less than 10 000 plants. The population is fragmented due to agricultural activities and overgrazing. The threat still exists.
