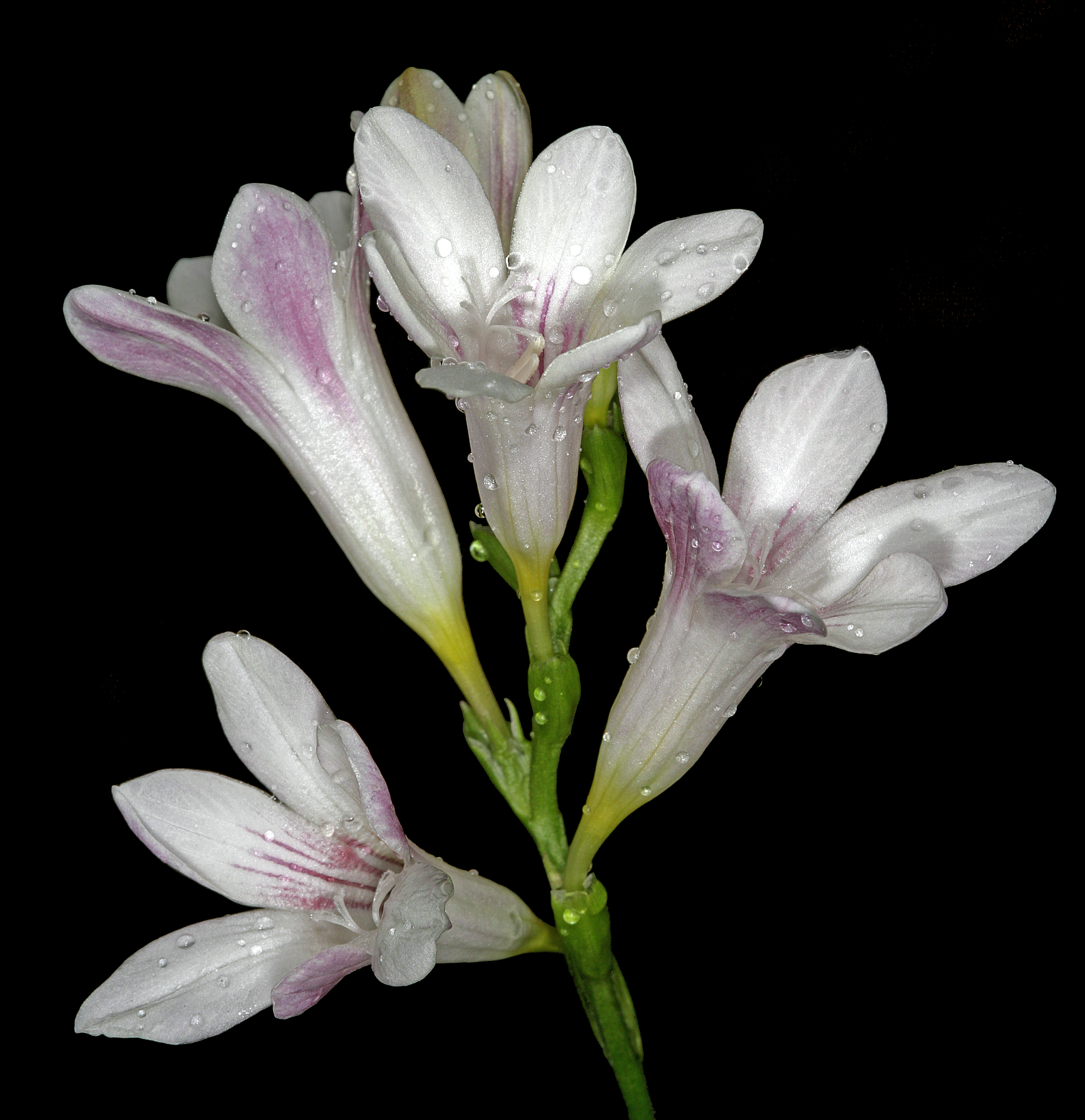

Scientific classification
- Kingdom: Plantae
- Clade: Tracheophytes
- Clade: Angiosperms
- Clade: Monocots
- Order: Asparagales
- Family: Iridaceae
- Genus: Freesia
- Species: F. caryophyllacea

Binomial name
- Freesia caryophyllacea (Burm.f.) N.E.Br., (1939)

Synonyms
- Anomatheca xanthospila (Redouté) Ker Gawl. ex Spreng.; Freesia elimensis L.Bolus; Freesia parva N.E.Br.; Freesia xanthospila (Redouté) Klatt; Gladiolus xanthospilus Redouté; Ixia caryophyllacea Burm.f.; Montbretia xanthospila (Redouté) Heynh.; Tritonia xanthospila (Redouté) Ker Gawl. ex Spreng.; Waitzia xanthospila (Redouté) Heynh.

= Freesia caryophyllacea =

Species of flowering plant

Freesia caryophyllacea is a dwarf, perennial geophyte endemic to the Western Cape and forms part of the fynbos. The species occurs from Wolseley to Swellendam, Hermanus and the Agulhas Plain. The plant grows to a height of 5 to 10 cm. The plant has already lost 77% of its habitat to agricultural activities, urban development and invasive plants. The phenomenon is still ongoing.
