= Freesia occidentalis =

Scientific classification
- Kingdom: Plantae
- Clade: Tracheophytes
- Clade: Angiosperms
- Clade: Monocots
- Order: Asparagales
- Family: Iridaceae
- Genus: Freesia
- Species: F. occidentalis

Binomial name
- Freesia occidentalis L.Bolus, (1933)

Synonyms
- Freesia framesii L.Bolus

Species of flowering plant

Freesia occidentalis is a perennial geophyte endemic to the Northern Cape and Western Cape. The species is part of the fynbos biome and occurs from Calvinia to the eastern side of the Cederberg and Swartruggensberg, southwards to Laingsburg.
