= Freesia praecox =

Scientific classification
- Kingdom: Plantae
- Clade: Tracheophytes
- Clade: Angiosperms
- Clade: Monocots
- Order: Asparagales
- Family: Iridaceae
- Genus: Freesia
- Species: F. praecox

Binomial name
- Freesia praecox J.C.Manning & Goldblatt, (2010)

Species of flowering plant

Freesia praecox is a species of flowering plant in the family Iridaceae. It is a perennial geophyte endemic to the Western Cape and is part of the fynbos. The species occurs on the foothills of the Riviersonderend Mountains, north of Riviersonderend. Here there is only one population that is threatened by development and invasive plants.
