= Freesia andersoniae =

Scientific classification
- Kingdom: Plantae
- Clade: Tracheophytes
- Clade: Angiosperms
- Clade: Monocots
- Order: Asparagales
- Family: Iridaceae
- Genus: Freesia
- Species: F. andersoniae

Binomial name
- Freesia andersoniae L.Bolus, (1927)

Species of flowering plant

Freesia andersoniae is a perennial, geophyte that is endemic to the North West, Eastern Cape, Western Cape and the Free State.
