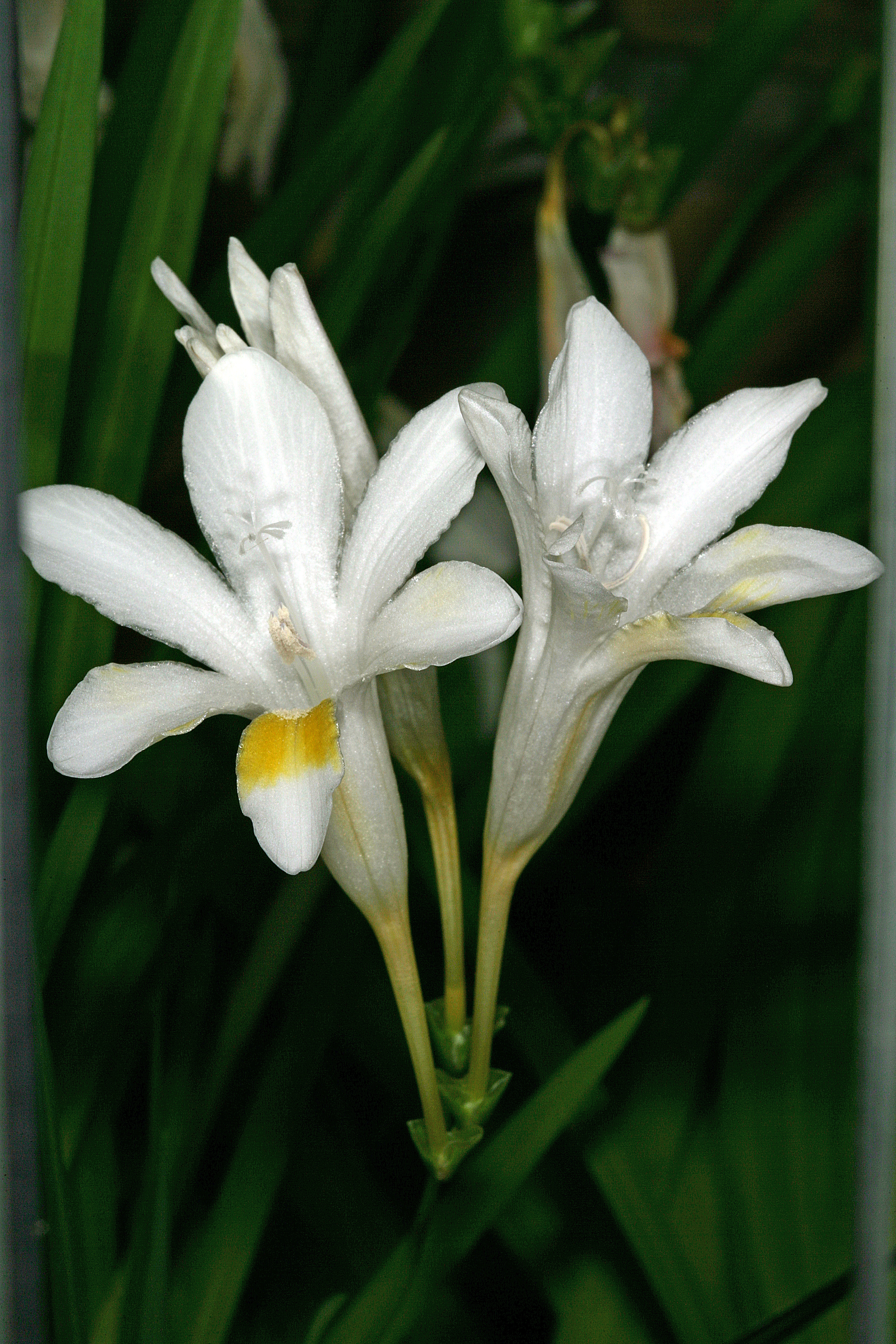

Scientific classification
- Kingdom: Plantae
- Clade: Tracheophytes
- Clade: Angiosperms
- Clade: Monocots
- Order: Asparagales
- Family: Iridaceae
- Genus: Freesia
- Species: F. leichtlinii

Binomial name
- Freesia leichtlinii Klatt

Synonyms
- Freesia muirii

= Freesia leichtlinii =

Species of plant

Freesia leichtlinii is a species of herb in the family Iridaceae, native to the Cape Provinces of South Africa. It is most widely known in its subspecies F. leichtlinii subsp. alba, commonly called Antique White Freesia, which has naturalized in California, the Mediterranean Basin, and parts of the Southern Hemisphere.

== Taxonomy and Nomenclature ==
The genus Freesia was first described as a distinct genus in 1866 by Christian Friedrich Ecklon and named in honor of Friedrich Heinrich Theodor Freese (died 1876), a German physician and student of South African plants. The epithet leichtlinii was named for Max Leichtlin, a German horticulturalist and plant collector active in the nineteenth century. In 2010 Freesia alba was consolidated into F. leichtlinii as a subspecies, creating the binomial Freesia leichtlinii subsp. alba.

== Toxicity ==
No part of the plant is considered harmful for human contact or ingestion. Freesia is listed by the American Society for the Prevention of Cruelty to Animals (ASPCA) among plants that are generally safe for dogs and cats. However, ingestion of the above-ground parts (leaves, stems, flowers) may cause mild gastrointestinal upset in sensitive animals. The corms are more irritating than the above-ground portions and can cause more significant gastrointestinal distress if consumed. Pet owners are advised to discourage animals from digging up and chewing on corms.

== Sources ==
This article incorporates text from a free content work. Licensed under CC0 (license statement/permission). Text taken from Freesia leichtlinii. Encyclopedia of Life.
