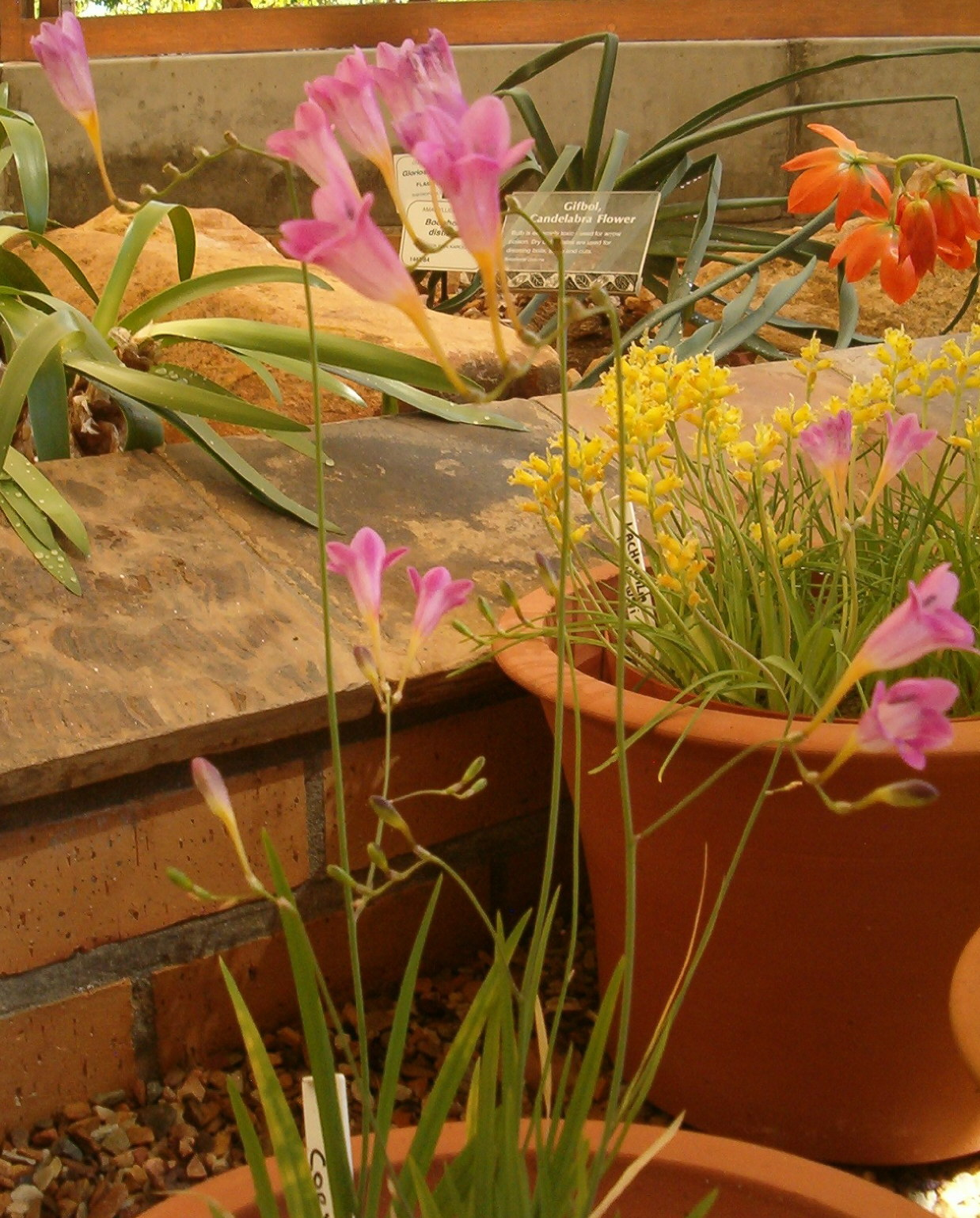

Scientific classification
- Kingdom: Plantae
- Clade: Tracheophytes
- Clade: Angiosperms
- Clade: Monocots
- Order: Asparagales
- Family: Iridaceae
- Genus: Freesia
- Species: F. corymbosa

Binomial name
- Freesia corymbosa (Burm.f.) N.E.Br. (1929)

Synonyms
- Freesia armstrongii W.Watson; Freesia aurea Hend. ex Gumbl.; Freesia brevis N.E.Br.; Freesia corymbosa var. aurea (Hend. ex Gumbl.) N.E.Br.; Freesia metelerkampiae L.Bolus; Freesia odorata (G.Lodd. ex Bosse) Eckl. ex Klatt; Freesia refracta var. odorata (G.Lodd. ex Bosse) Baker; Gladiolus corymbosus Burm.f.; Montbretia odorata (G.Lodd. ex Bosse) Heynh.; Tritonia odorata G.Lodd. ex Bosse; Waitzia odorata (G.Lodd. ex Bosse) Heynh.

= Freesia corymbosa =

Species of flowering plant

Freesia corymbosa is a perennial, geophyte native to the Eastern and Western Cape. The species occurs from the Great Swartberg through the Langkloof to Grahamstown, King William’s Town and Butterworth. It also forms part of the fynbos and Albany thickets biomes.
