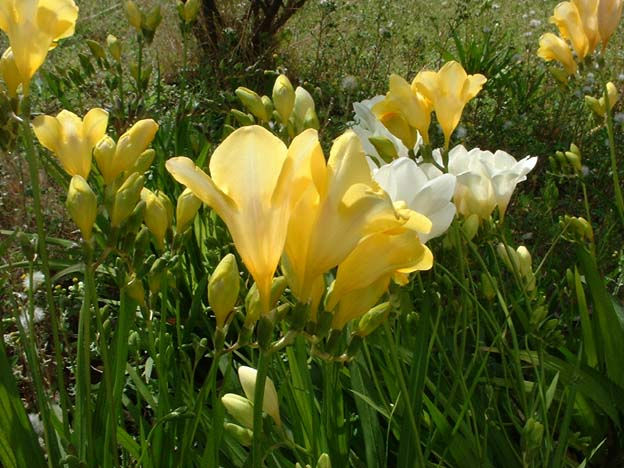
- Cultivated freesias

Scientific classification
- Kingdom: Plantae
- Clade: Tracheophytes
- Clade: Angiosperms
- Clade: Monocots
- Order: Asparagales
- Family: Iridaceae
- Subfamily: Crocoideae
- Tribe: Freesieae
- Genus: Freesia; Eckl. ex Klatt

Type species
- Freesia refracta (Jacquin) Klatt

Synonyms
- Anomatheca Ker Gawl.; Nymanina Kuntze

= Freesia =

Genus of flowering plants

Freesia is a genus of herbaceous perennial flowering plants in the family Iridaceae, first described as a genus in 1866 by Christian Friedrich Ecklon (1886) and named after the German botanist and medical practitioner, Friedrich Freese (1795–1876). It is native to the eastern side of southern Africa, from Kenya south to South Africa, most species being found in Cape Provinces. Species of the former genus Anomatheca are now included in Freesia. The plants commonly known as "freesias", with fragrant funnel-shaped flowers, are cultivated hybrids of a number of Freesia species. Some other species are also grown as ornamental plants.

== Description ==
They are herbaceous plants which grow from a conical corm 1–2.5 cm (1/2–1 in) diameter, which sends up a tuft of narrow leaves 10–30 cm (4–12 in) long, and a sparsely branched stem 10–40 cm (4–16 in) tall bearing a few leaves and a loose one-sided spike of flowers with six petals. Many species have fragrant narrowly funnel-shaped flowers, although those formerly placed in the genus Anomatheca, such as F. laxa, have flat flowers.

Freesias are used as food plants by the larvae of some Lepidoptera species including the large yellow underwing.

== Systematics ==
The genus was named in honor of Friedrich Heinrich Theodor Freese (1795–1876), a German physician.

Species

- Freesia andersoniae L.Bolus - the Cape Provinces, Free State
- Freesia caryophyllacea (Burm.f.) N.E.Br. (syn. F. elimensis L.Bolus, F. parva N.E.Br., F. xanthospila (DC.) Klatt) - Heuningrug region in the Cape Provinces
- Freesia corymbosa (Burm.f.) N.E.Br. (syn. F. armstrongii W.Watson, F. brevis N.E.Br., F. aurea Hend., F. odorata (G.Lodd. ex Bosse) Eckl. ex Klatt) - the Cape Provinces
- Freesia fergusoniae L.Bolus - the Cape Provinces
- Freesia fucata J.C.Manning & Goldblatt - Hoeks River Valley in the Cape Provinces
- Freesia grandiflora (Baker) Klatt - Zaire, Tanzania, Malawi, Mozambique, Zambia, Zimbabwe, Eswatini, northeastern South Africa
- Freesia laxa (Thunb.) Goldblatt & J.C.Manning (syn. F. cruenta (Lindl.) Klatt) - from Rwanda + Kenya south to the Cape Provinces; naturalized in Madeira, Mauritius, Réunion, Australia, Florida, Argentina
- Freesia leichtlinii Klatt (syn. F. middlemostii F.Barker, F. muirii N.E.Br., Freesia alba G.L.Mey. = F. leichtlinii subsp. alba (G.L.Mey.) J.C.Manning & Goldblatt) - the Cape Provinces; naturalized in Corsica, California, Florida, Argentina
- Freesia marginata J.C.Manning & Goldblatt - the Cape Provinces
- Freesia occidentalis L.Bolus (syn. F. framesii L.Bolus) - the Cape Provinces
- Freesia praecox J.C.Manning & Goldblatt - the Cape Provinces
- Freesia refracta (Jacq.) Klatt (syn. F. hurlingii L.Bolus) - the Cape Provinces; naturalized in France, Canary Islands, Madeira, Bermuda, St. Helena
- Freesia sparrmanii (Thunb.) N.E.Br. - Langeberg in the Cape Provinces
- Freesia speciosa L.Bolus (syn. F. flava (E.Phillips & N.E.Br.) N.E.Br.) - the Cape Provinces
- Freesia verrucosa (B.Vogel) Goldblatt & J.C.Manning (syn. F. juncea (Pourr.) Klatt) - the Cape Provinces
- Freesia viridis (Aiton) Goldblatt & J.C.Manning - Namibia, the Cape Provinces

Species of the former genus Anomatheca are now included in Freesia:

- Anomatheca cruenta Lindl. = Freesia laxa subsp. laxa
- Anomatheca grandiflora Baker = Freesia grandiflora
- Anomatheca juncea (Pourr.) Ker Gawl. = Freesia verrucosa
- Anomatheca laxa (Thunb.) Goldblatt = Freesia laxa
- Anomatheca verrucosa (B.Vogel) Goldblatt = Freesia verrucosa
- Anomatheca viridis (Aiton) Goldblatt = Freesia viridis
- Anomatheca xanthospila (DC.) Ker Gawl. = Freesia caryophyllacea

== Cultivation and uses ==
The plants usually called "freesias" in horticulture and floristry are derived from crosses made in the 19th century between Freesia refracta and Freesia leichtlinii. Numerous cultivars have been bred from these species and the pink- and yellow-flowered forms of Freesia corymbosa. Modern tetraploid cultivars have flowers ranging from white to yellow, pink, red and blue-mauve. They are mostly cultivated professionally in the Netherlands by about 80 growers. Freesias can be readily increased from seed.

The flowers themselves are mainly used in wedding bouquets. The flower's fragrance cannot be extracted with a solvent; in the early 1980s International Flavors & Fragrances used their "Living Flowers" headspace technology to analyze live freesia blooms and the analysis was used for the first time in a fragrance: Antonia's Flowers (1984).

Freesia laxa (formerly called Lapeirousia laxa or Anomatheca cruenta) is one of the other species of the genus which is commonly cultivated. Smaller than the scented freesia cultivars, it has flat rather than cup-shaped flowers.

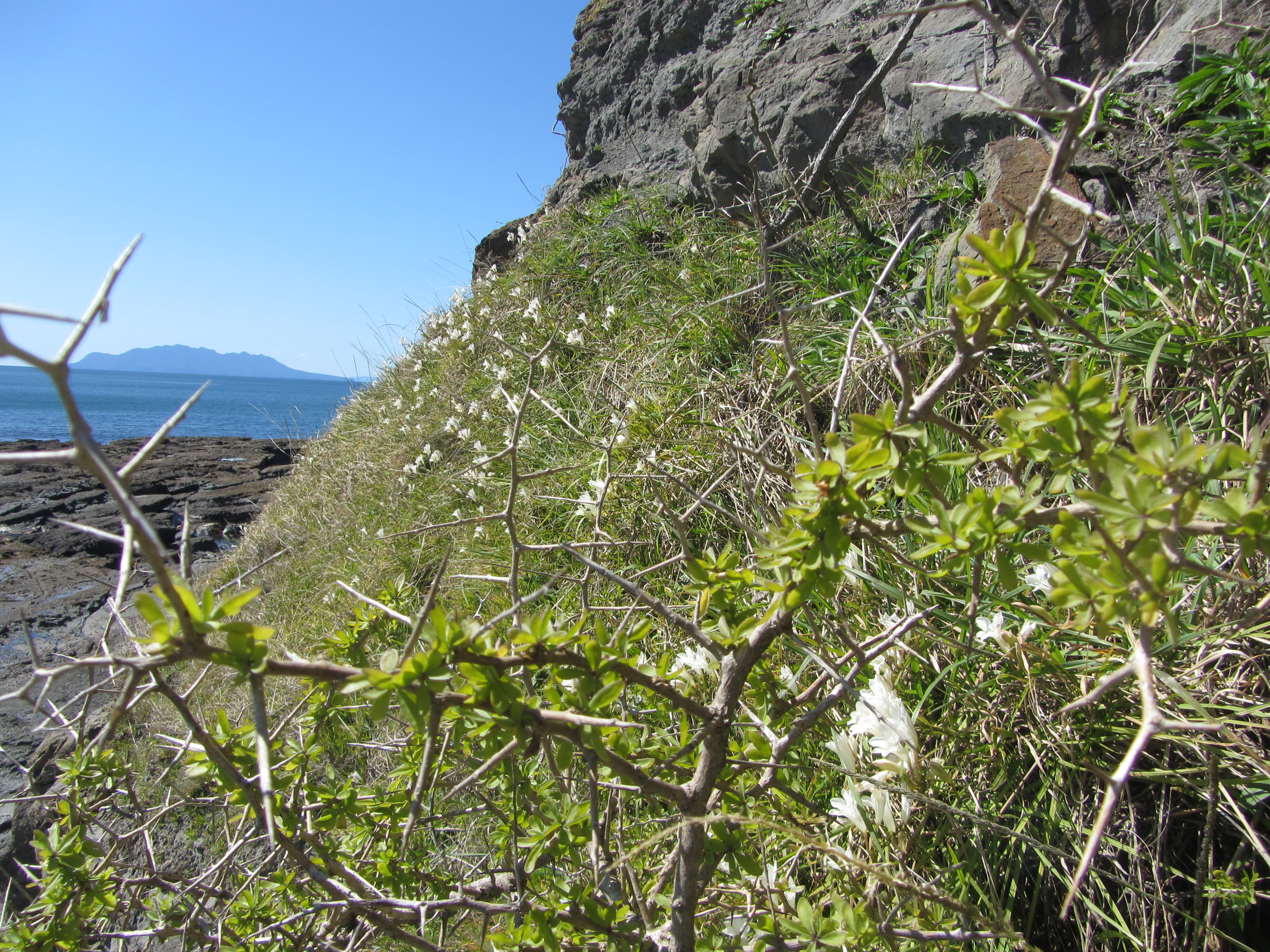
Freesia plants in native habitat

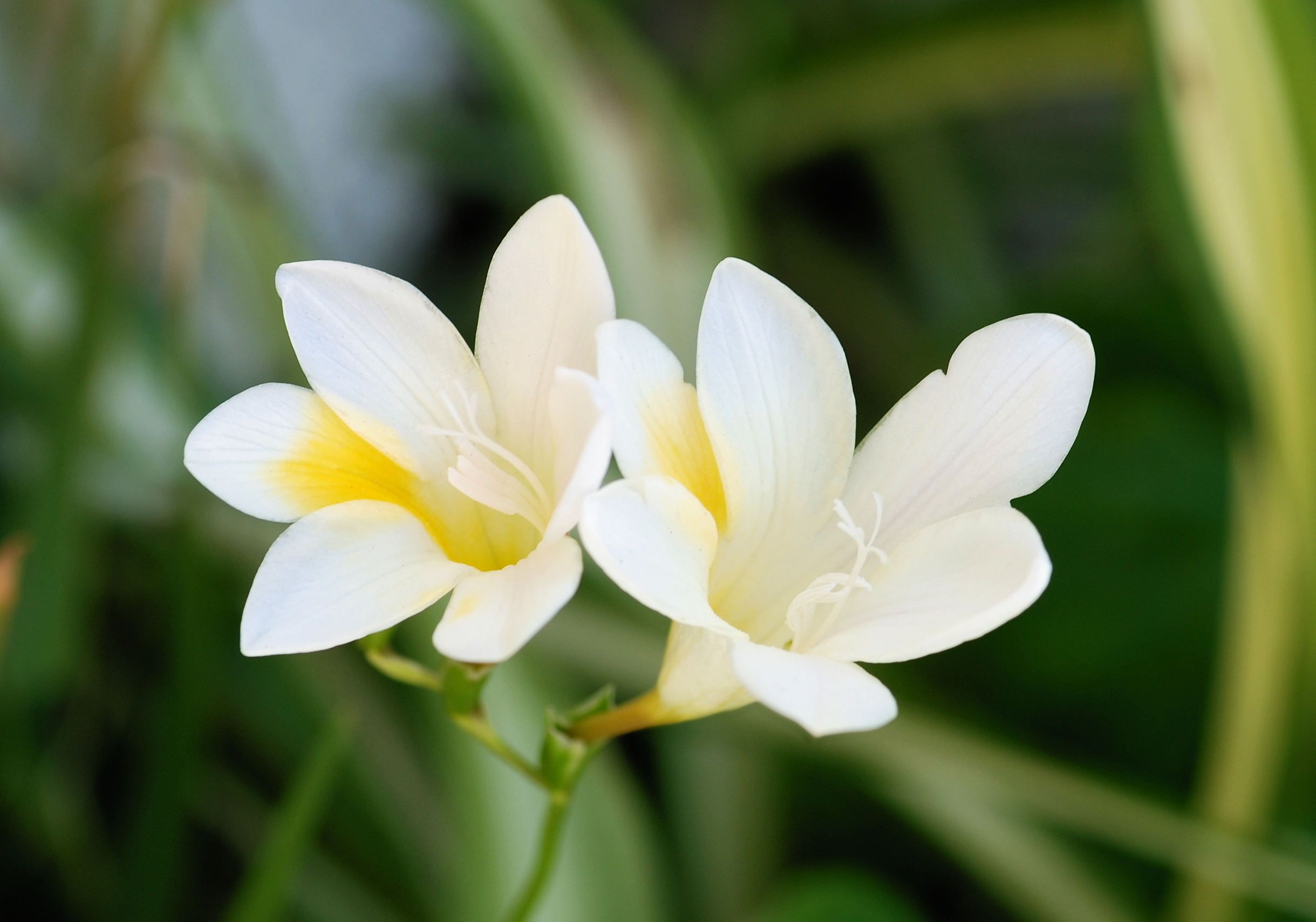
Freesia alba (F. leichtlinii subsp. alba)

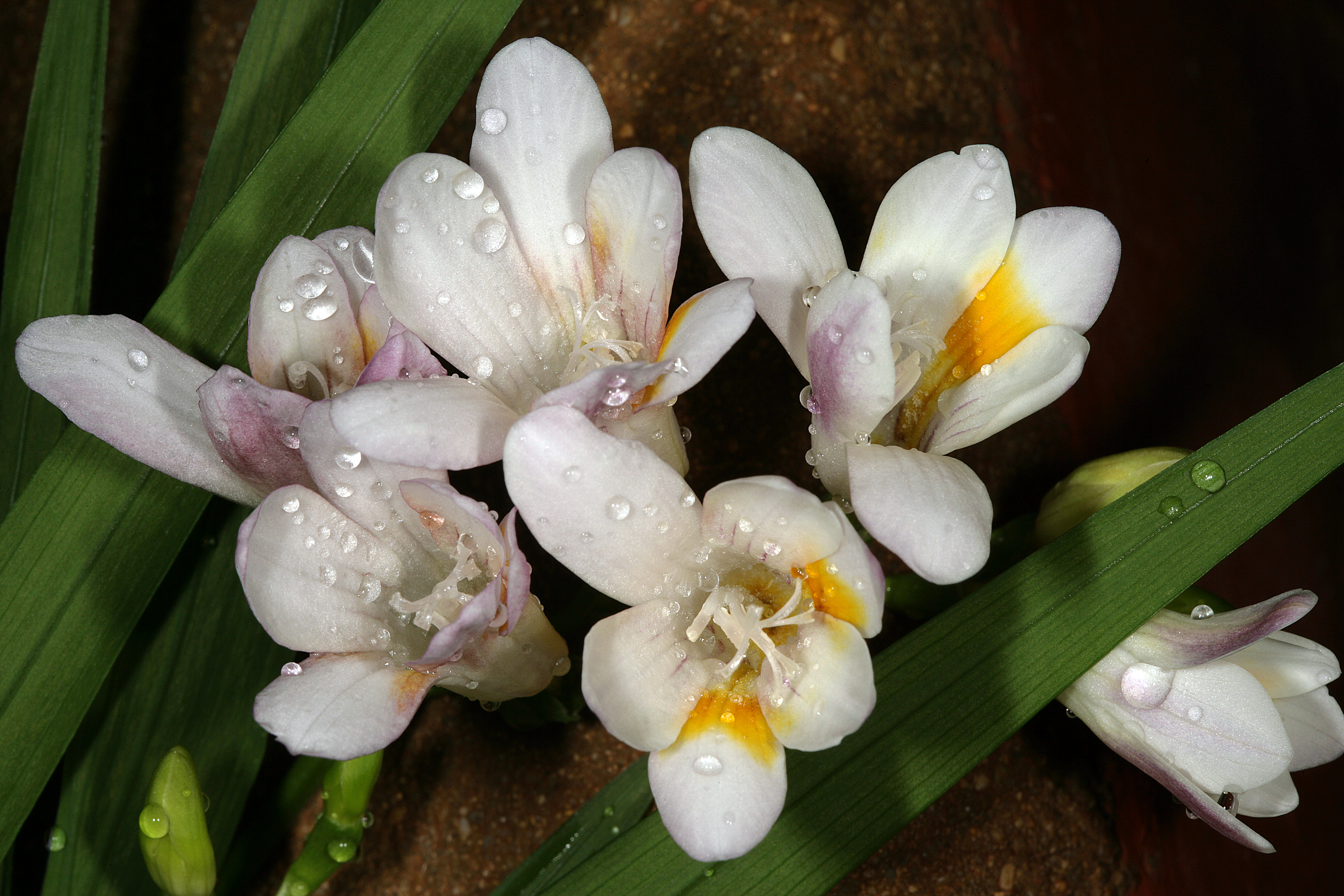
Freesia caryophyllacea

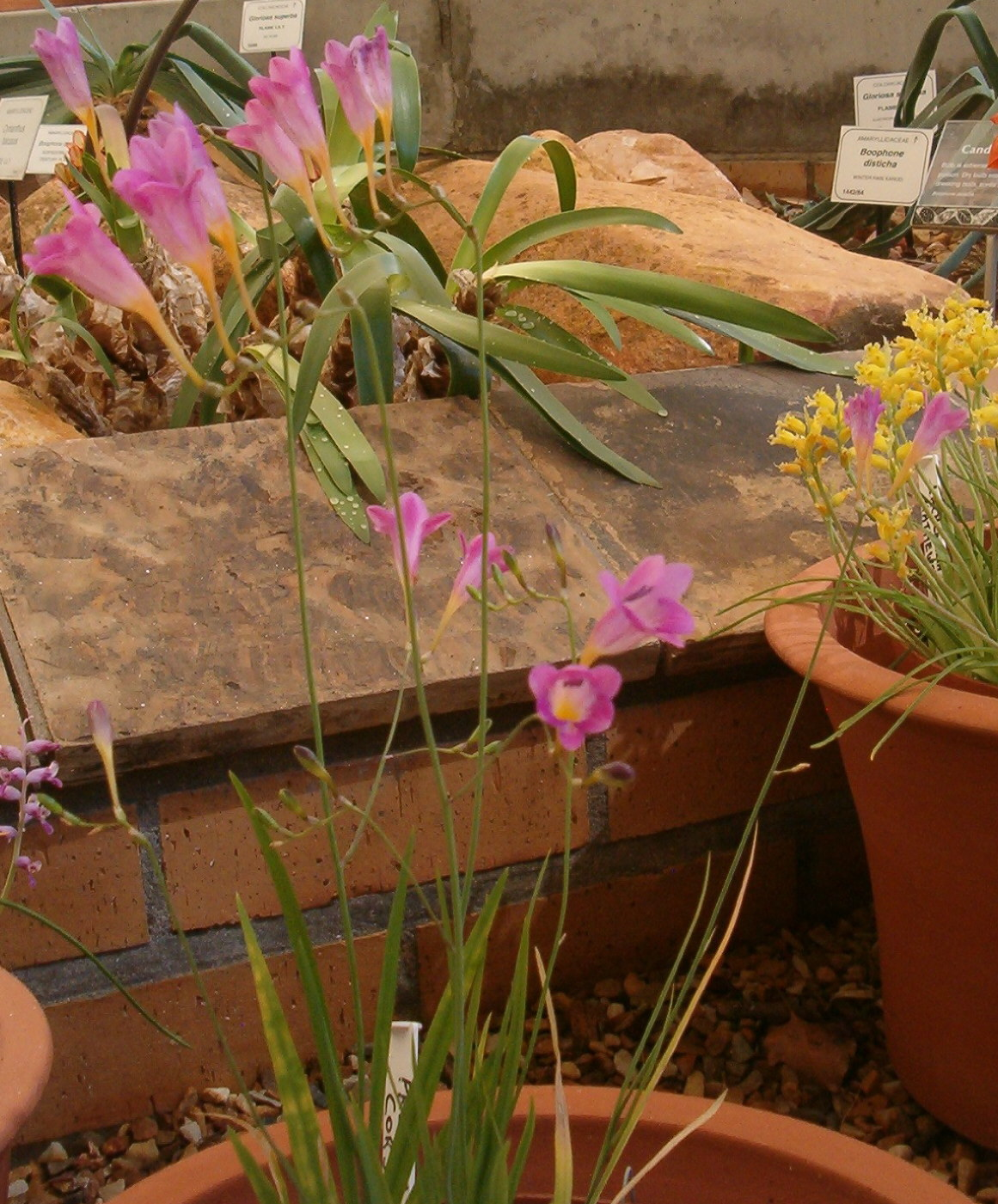
Freesia corymbosa

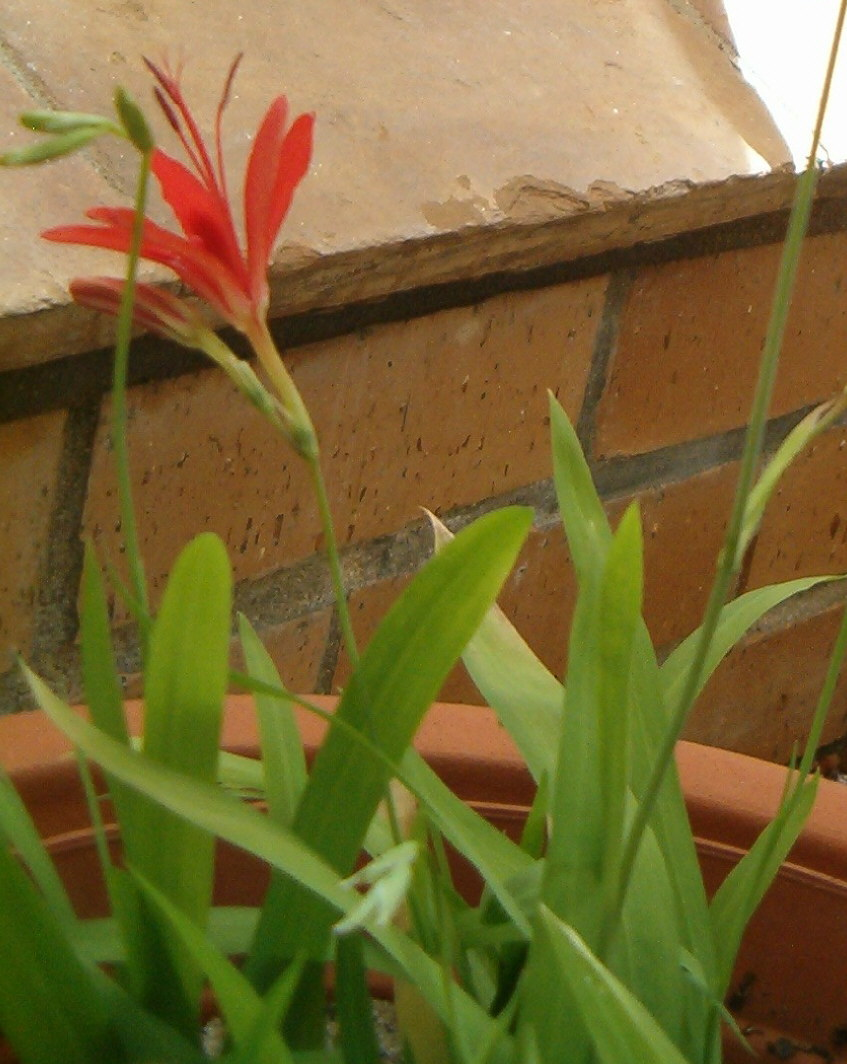
Freesia grandiflora

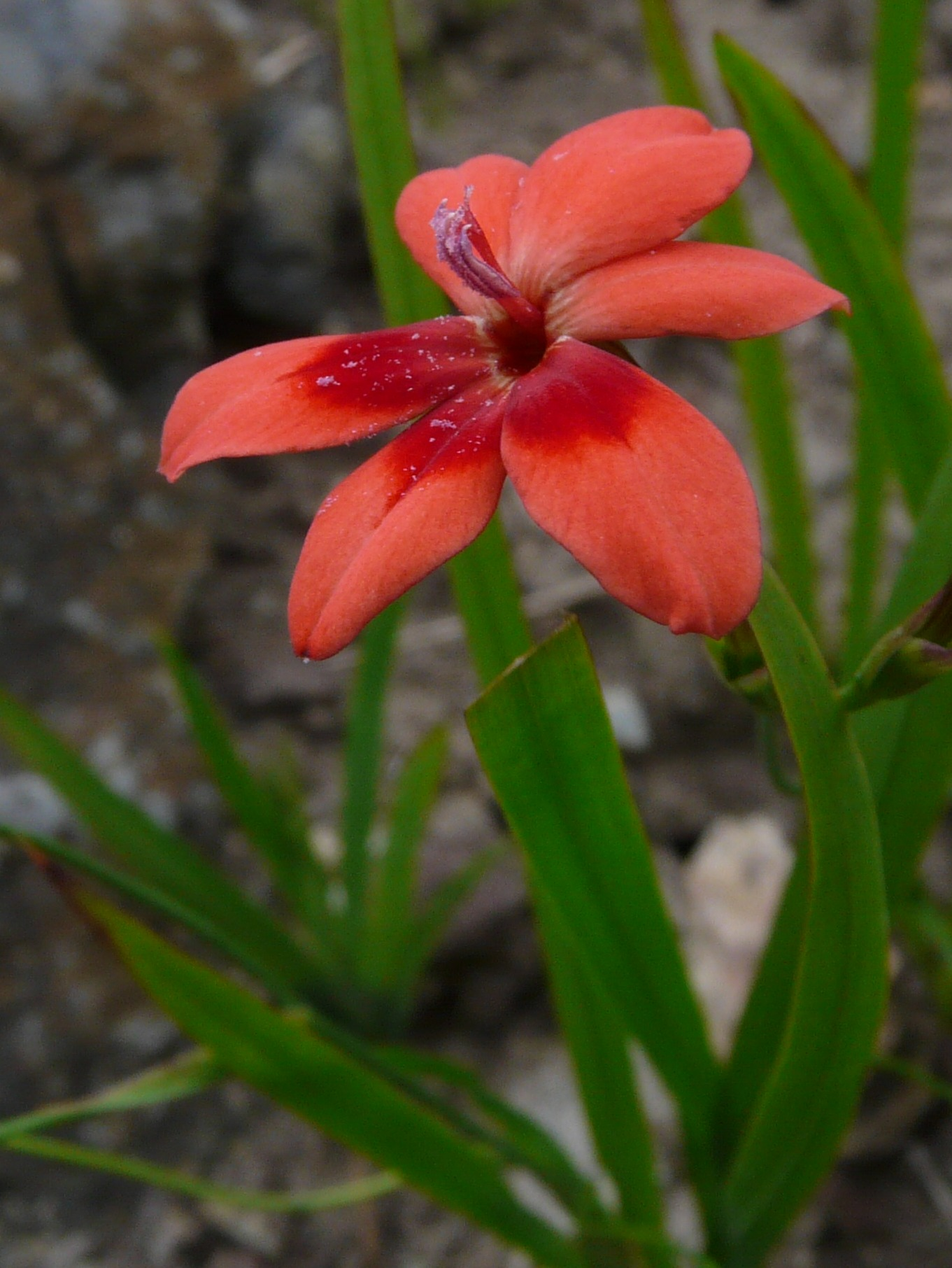
Freesia laxa

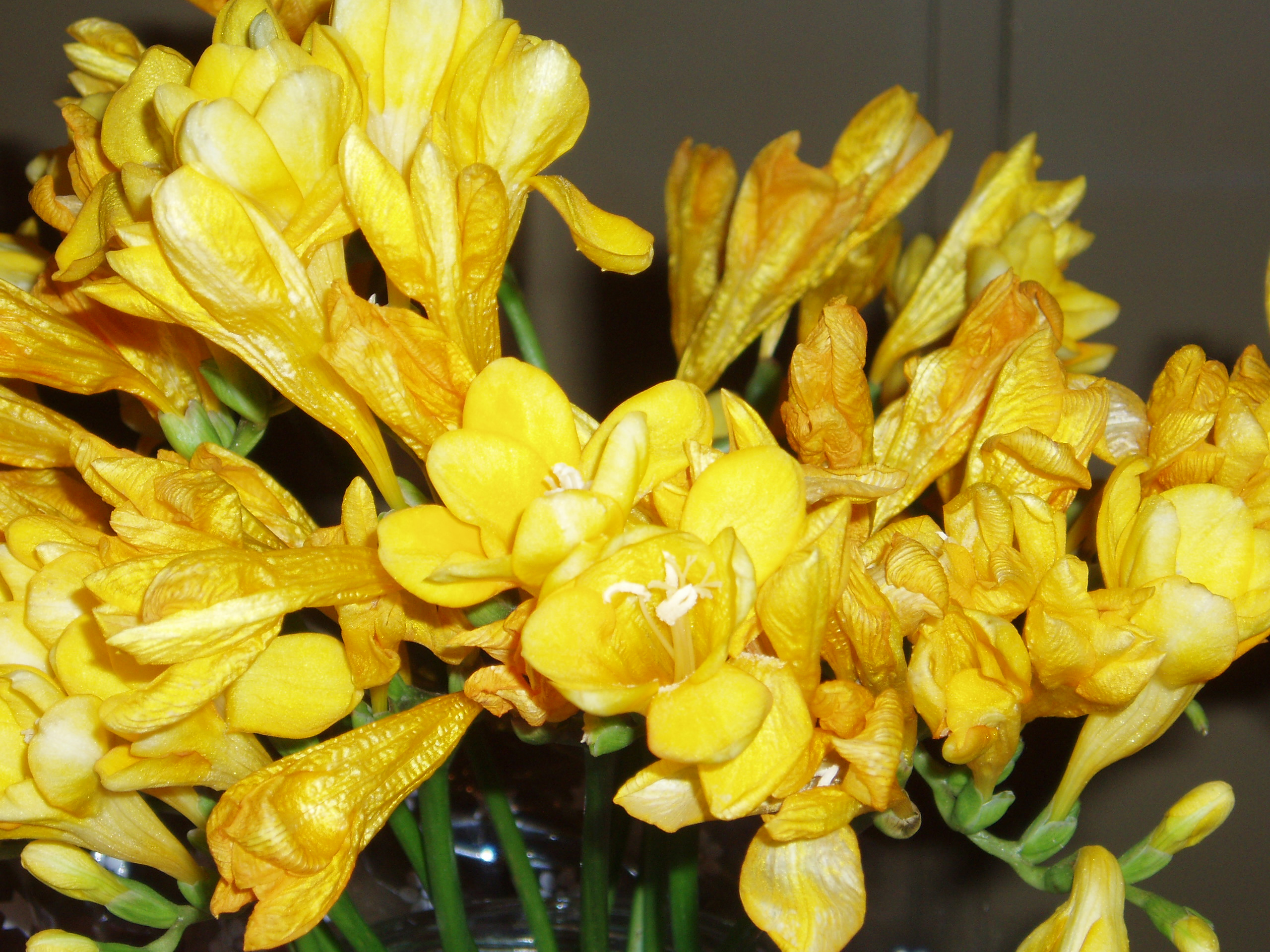
Freesia refracta (garden cultivar)

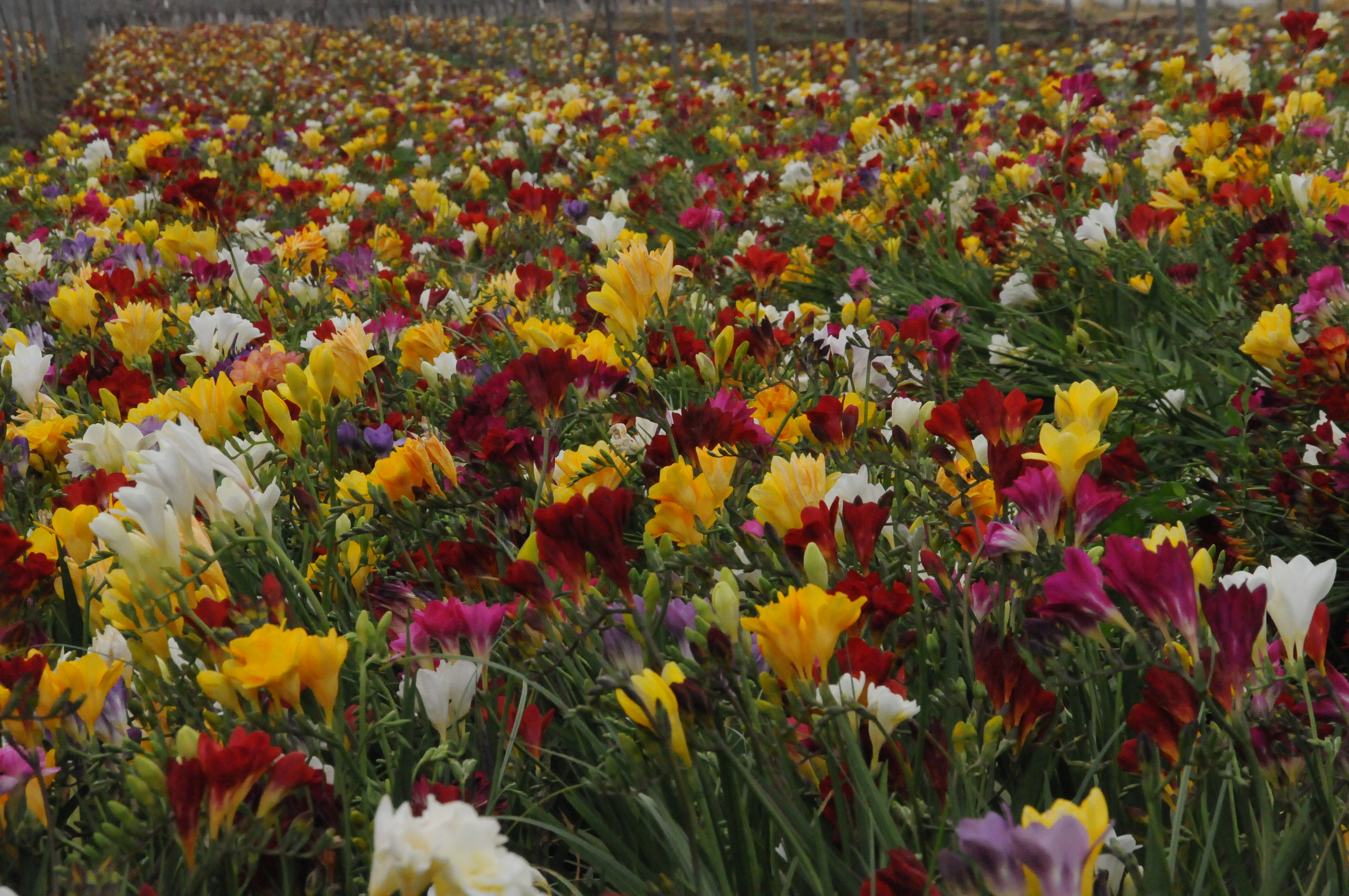
Variety of freesia cultivars

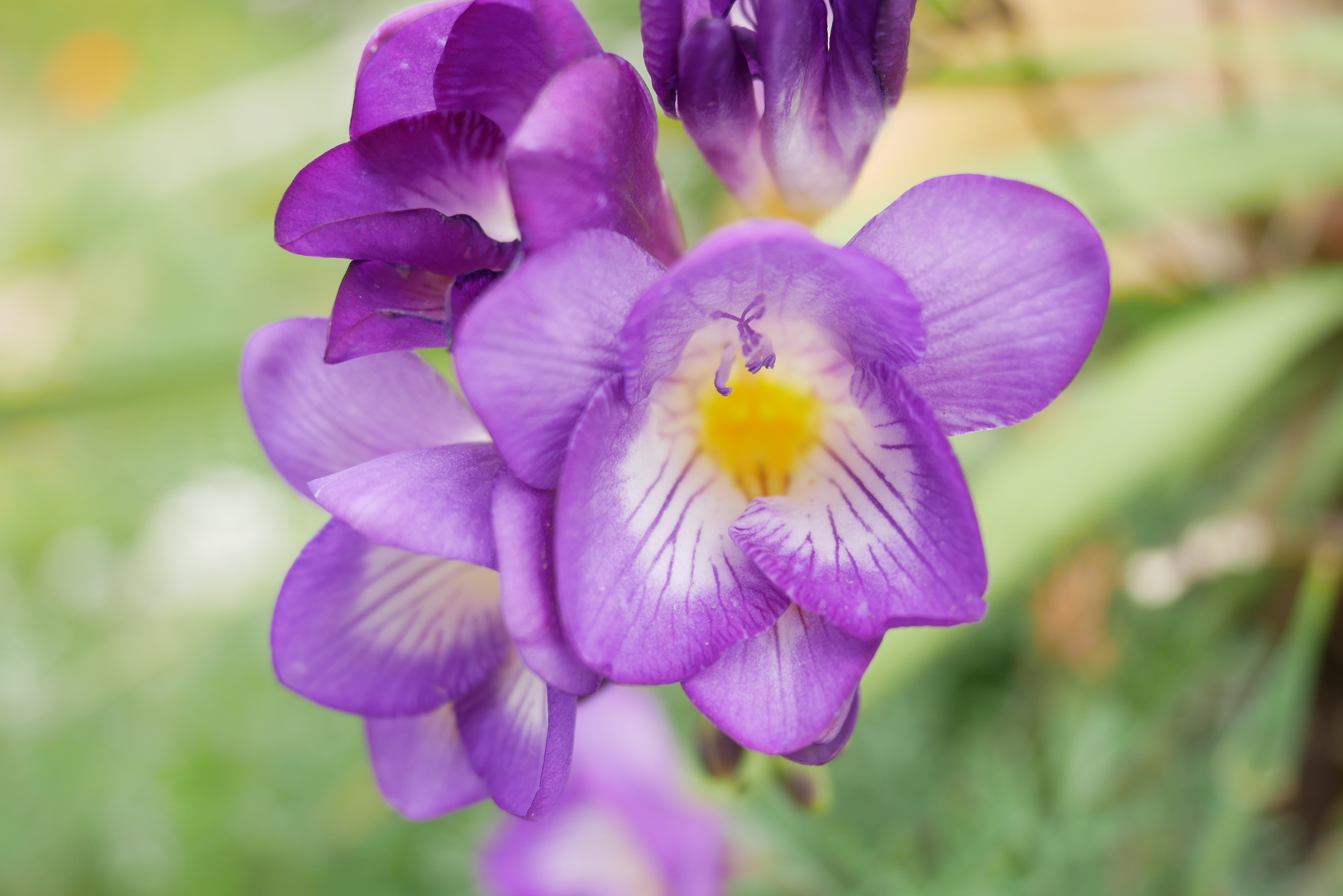
Mauve-colored freesia cultivar

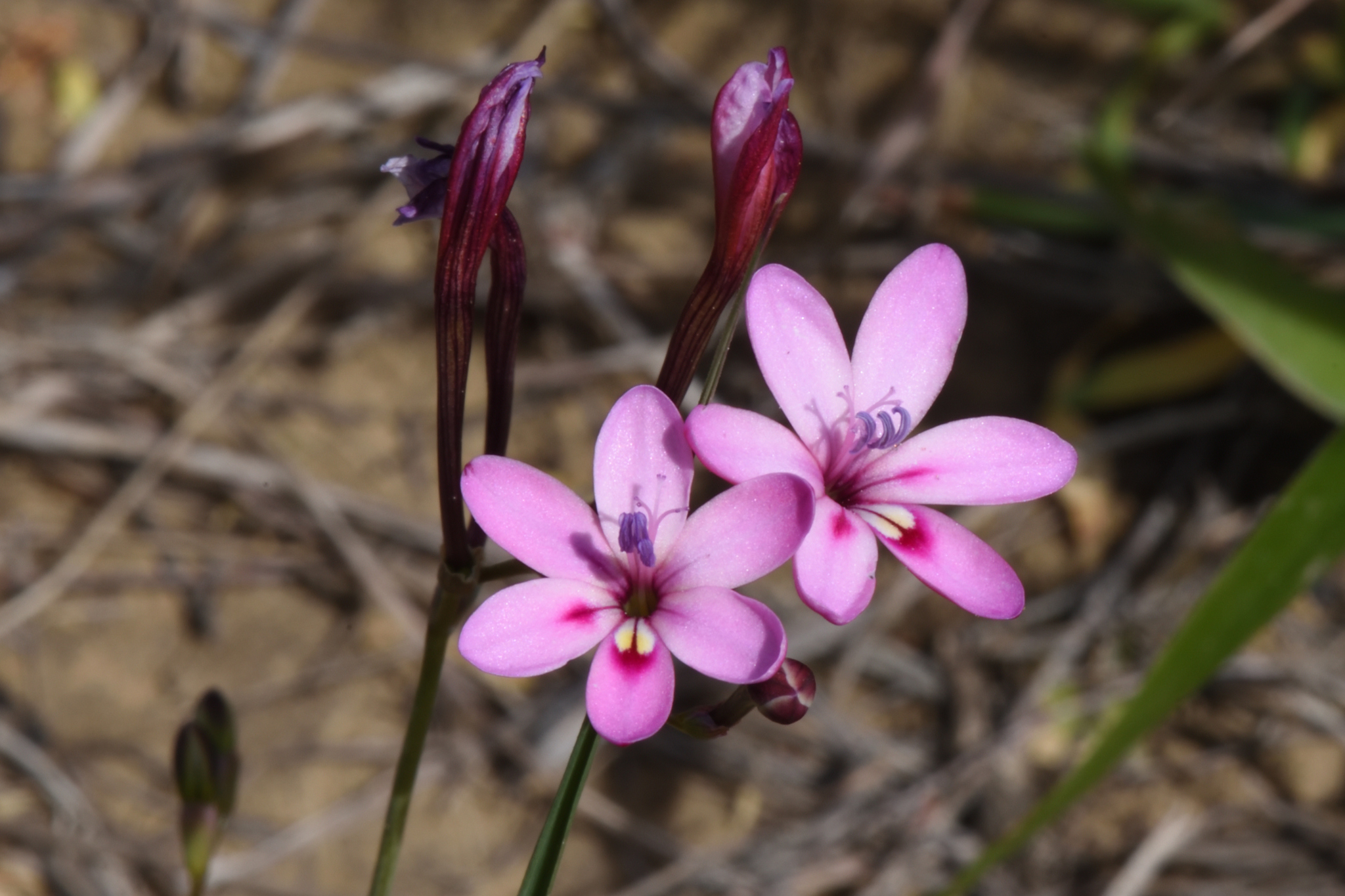
Freesia verrucosa

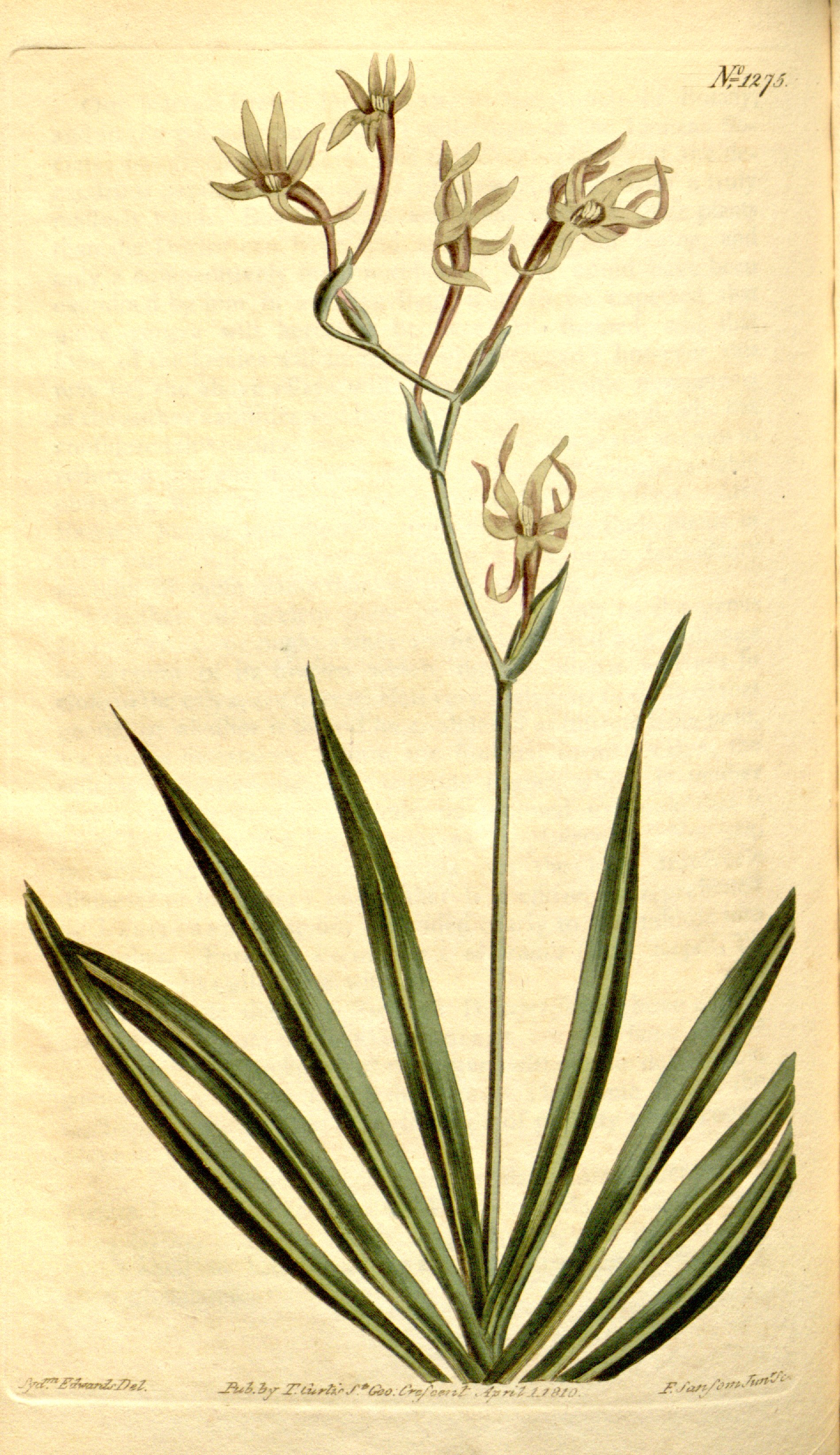
Freesia viridis in Curtis's Botanical Magazine, Volume 31: t. 1275, as Tritonia viridis

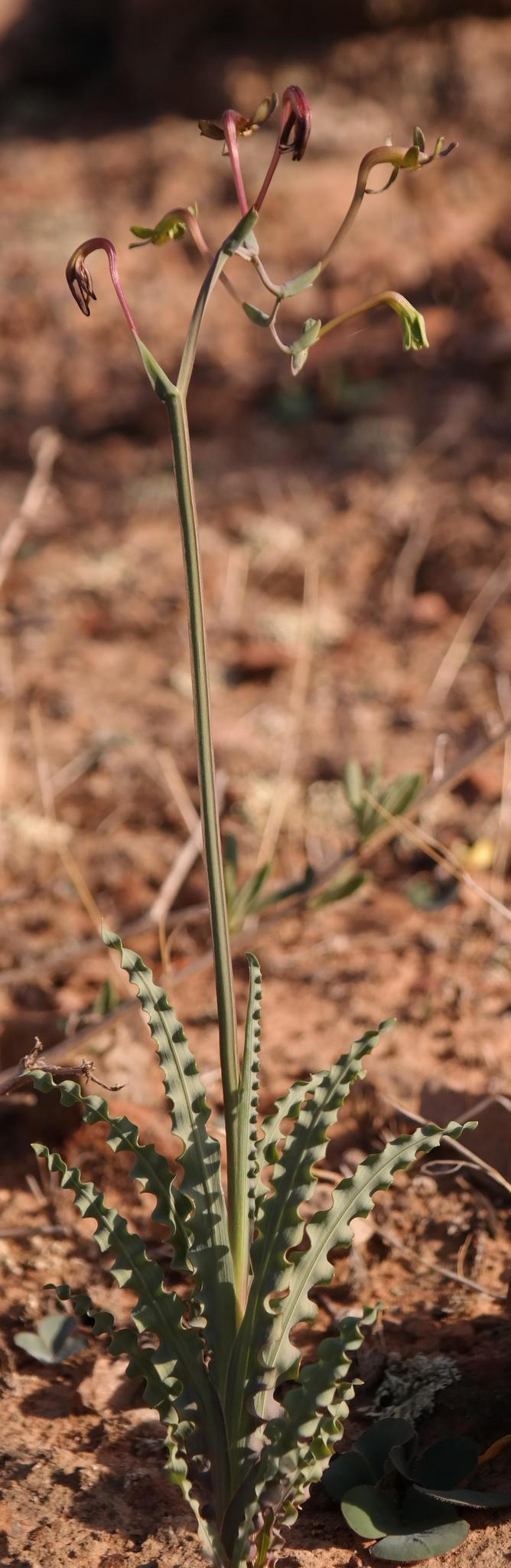
Freesia viridis subsp. crispifolia

== Bibliography ==
- Manning, John C.; Goldblatt, Peter (2010). Botany and horticulture of the genus Freesia (Iridaceae). Strelitzia vol. 27. Pretoria: South African National Biodiversity Institute, SANBI. ISBN 978-1-919976-58-7.
- Goldblatt, P. (1982) Systematics of Freesia Klatt (Iridaceae) J. South African Bot. 48:39-93.
