= Scorpion tail (disambiguation) =

Scorpion tail, scorpion-tail, or scorpion's tail typically refers to the tail of a scorpion.

It may also refer to

- Scorpion's tail, another name for pigache shoes
- Scorpion's tail, another name for plants in genus Scorpiurus
- Scorpion tail, another name for the plant Heliotropium angiospermum
- The Scorpion Tail, a book by Douglas Preston and Lincoln Child
- The Scorpion's Tail, a cluster of stars also known as Messier 7

== See also ==
- "The Scorpion's Tale", an episode of The Simpsons, an American TV show
