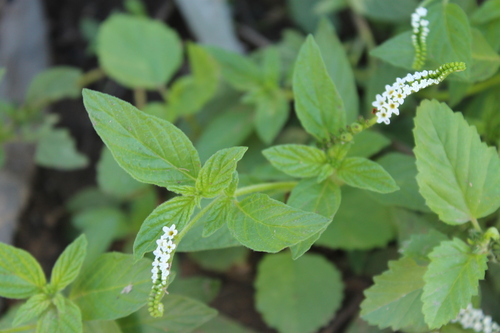

Scientific classification
- Kingdom: Plantae
- Clade: Tracheophytes
- Clade: Angiosperms
- Clade: Eudicots
- Clade: Asterids
- Order: Boraginales
- Family: Heliotropiaceae
- Genus: Heliotropium
- Species: H. angiospermum

Binomial name
- Heliotropium angiospermum Murray

= Heliotropium angiospermum =

Species of flowering plant

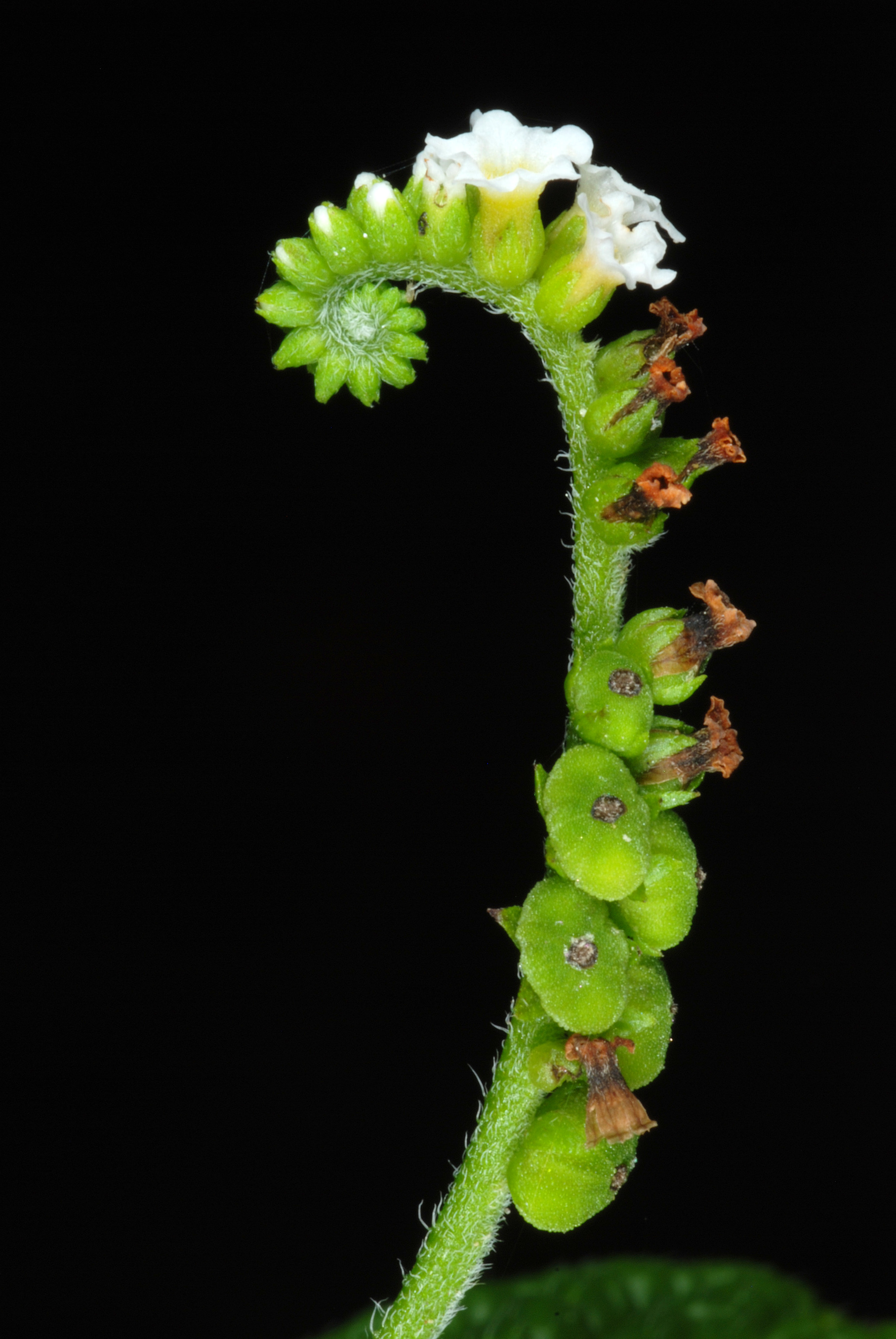
Close-up of scorpioid inflorescence

Heliotropium angiospermum, common name scorpion's tail or scorpion-tail, is a flowering plant in the Heliotropium genus and family Heliotropiaceae. An annual or short-lived perennial it grows in Florida and Texas into Mexico as well as on various islands in arid lowlands. Its nectar is sought-out by butterflies and also provides food for bees and birds. The stems terminate in scorpioid inflorescences.

It is employed for medicinal uses on some Caribbean islands.

It can tolerate rocky or sandy soil and grows up to 3-feet high.

== See also ==
- List of Heliotropium species
- List of flora of the Sonoran Desert Region by common name
- Scorpiurus muricatus, sometimes referred to as prickly scorpion's-tail
- Heliotropium andersonii, similar species with narrower leaves
- Heliotropium curassavicum, "monkey tail"
