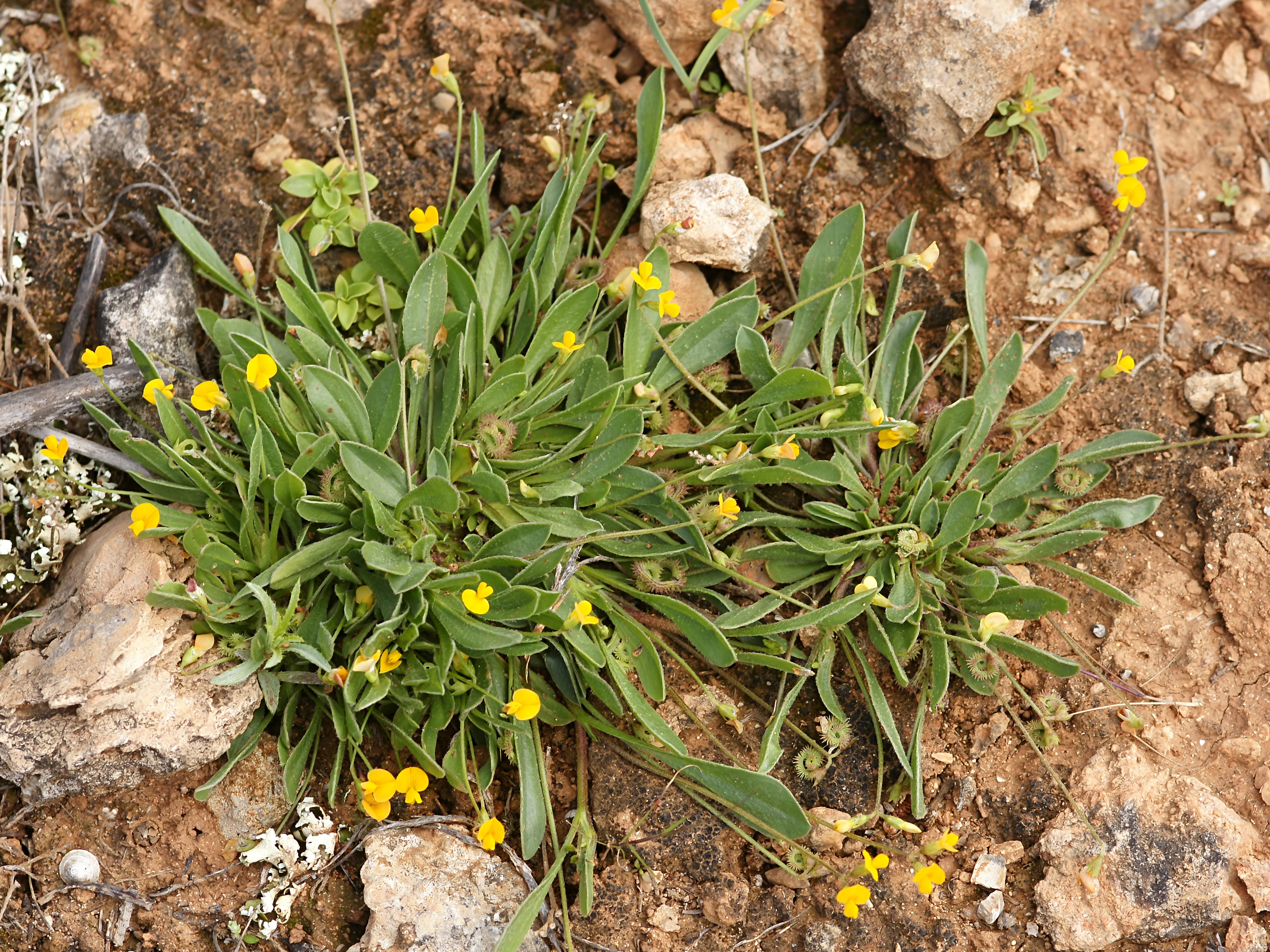

Scientific classification
- Kingdom: Plantae
- Clade: Tracheophytes
- Clade: Angiosperms
- Clade: Eudicots
- Clade: Rosids
- Order: Fabales
- Family: Fabaceae
- Subfamily: Faboideae
- Genus: Scorpiurus
- Species: S. muricatus

Binomial name
- Scorpiurus muricatus L.

Synonyms
- List: Scorpioides elegans Bubani; Scorpioides muricata (L.) Medik.; Scorpioides sulcata (L.) Medik.; Scorpiurus acutifolius Viv.; Scorpiurus echinatus Lam.; Scorpiurus laevigatus Sm.; Scorpiurus margaritae P.Palau; Scorpiurus minimus Losinsk.; Scorpiurus muricatus var. margaritae (P.Palau) E.Domínguez & E.F.Galiano; Scorpiurus oliveri P.Palau; Scorpiurus subvillosus L.; Scorpiurus sulcatus L.

= Scorpiurus muricatus =

Species of legume

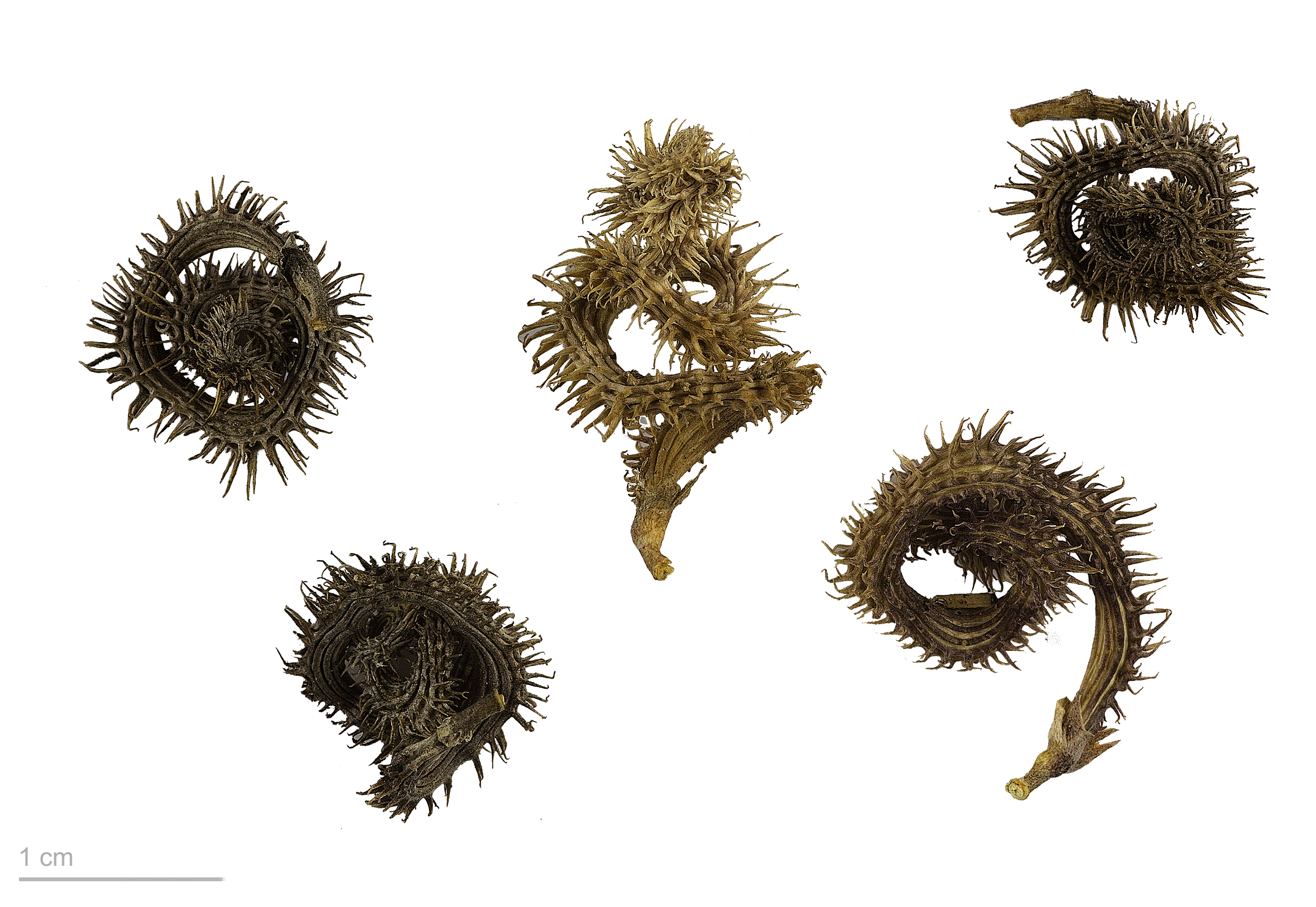
Scorpiurus muricatus - MHNT

Scorpiurus muricatus, the caterpillar-plant or prickly scorpion's-tail, is an annual leguminous plant native to southern Europe and the region of Syria with tiny pea-like flowers and simple leaves uncharacteristic of a legume. Its contorted, pubescent pods give rise to its common name "prickly caterpillar". Extracts of the species have been found to have allelopathic effects on microbes of the genus Fusarium due to the high concentration of phytoalexins in the plants' tissues.

This is mainly a garden plant used as a groundcover. Its densely haired pods may be added to salads for interest, and its leaves used as a salad herb in some Mediterranean countries.
