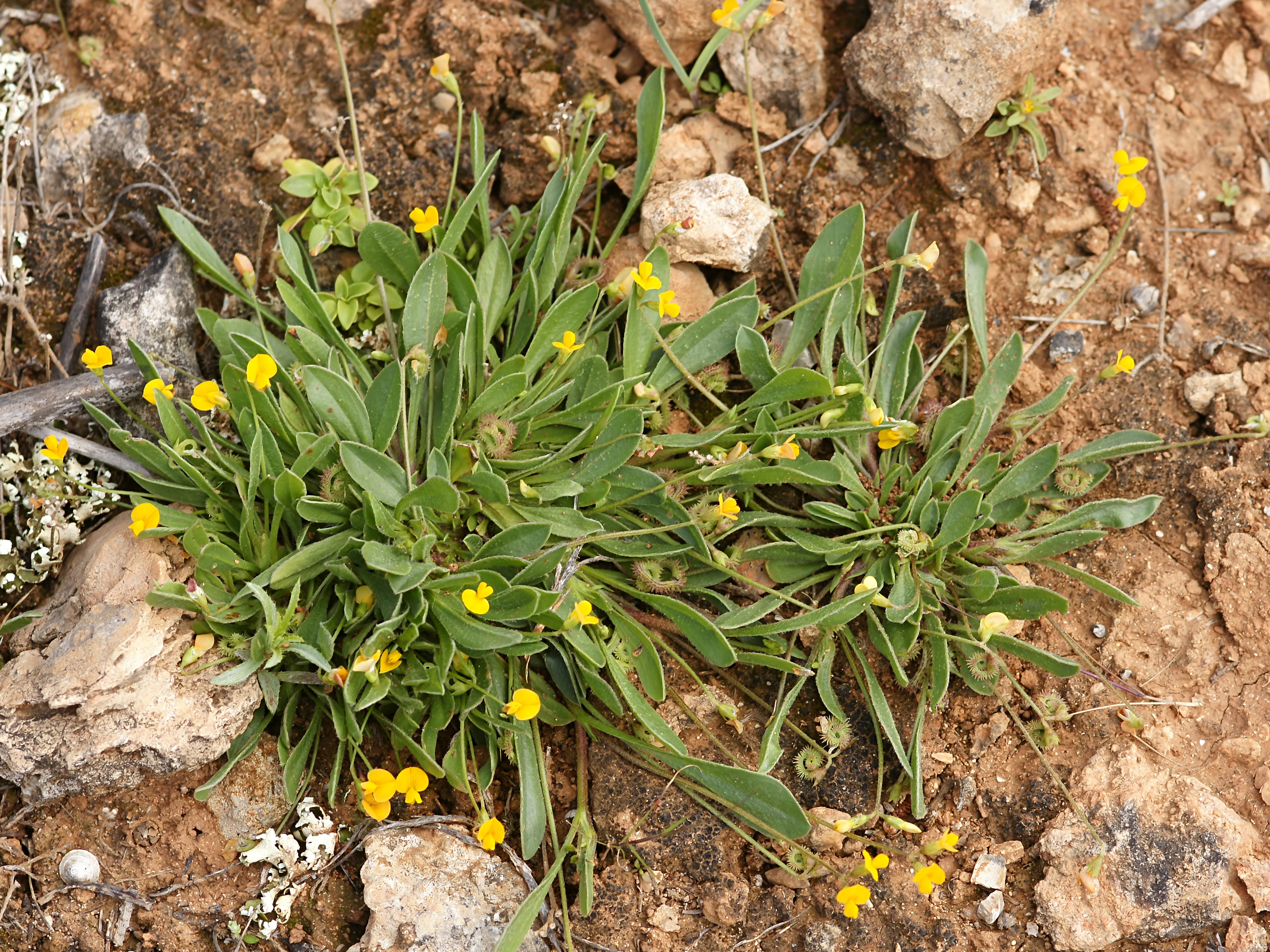
- Scorpiurus muricatus

Scientific classification
- Kingdom: Plantae
- Clade: Tracheophytes
- Clade: Angiosperms
- Clade: Eudicots
- Clade: Rosids
- Order: Fabales
- Family: Fabaceae
- Subfamily: Faboideae
- Tribe: Loteae
- Genus: Scorpiurus; L. (1753)

Synonyms
- Scorpioides Hill (1756), nom. superfl.

= Scorpiurus (plant) =

Genus of legumes

Scorpiurus, the scorpion's-tails, is a genus of flowering plants in the legume family, Fabaceae. It belongs to the subfamily Faboideae. It contains only two species: Scorpiurus muricatus, which is used in gardening and in salads as a garnish, and Scorpiurus vermiculatus. Both are native to the Mediterranean region and the Near East.

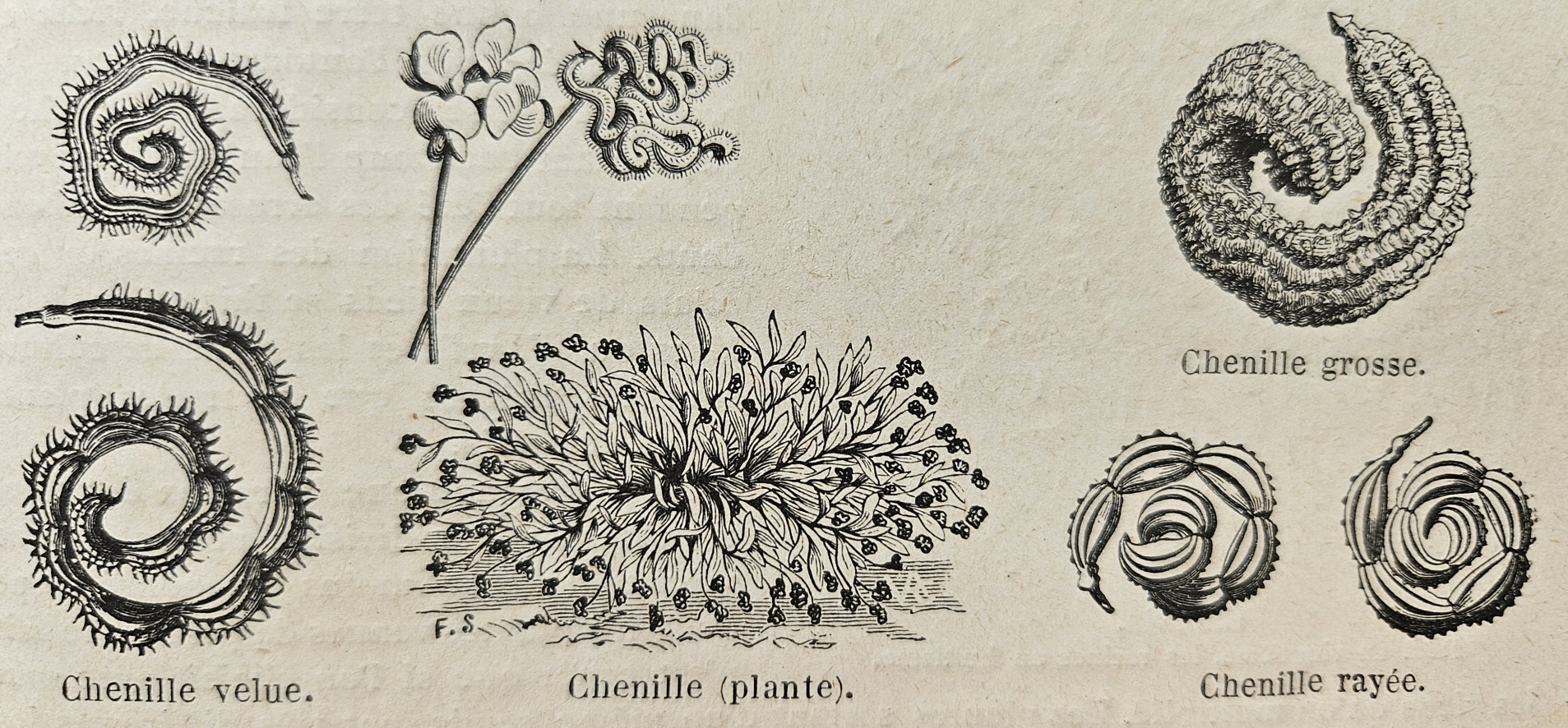
Illustrations of several "caterpillars", pods of Scorpiurus sp in "Les plantes potagères" Vilmorin 1925
