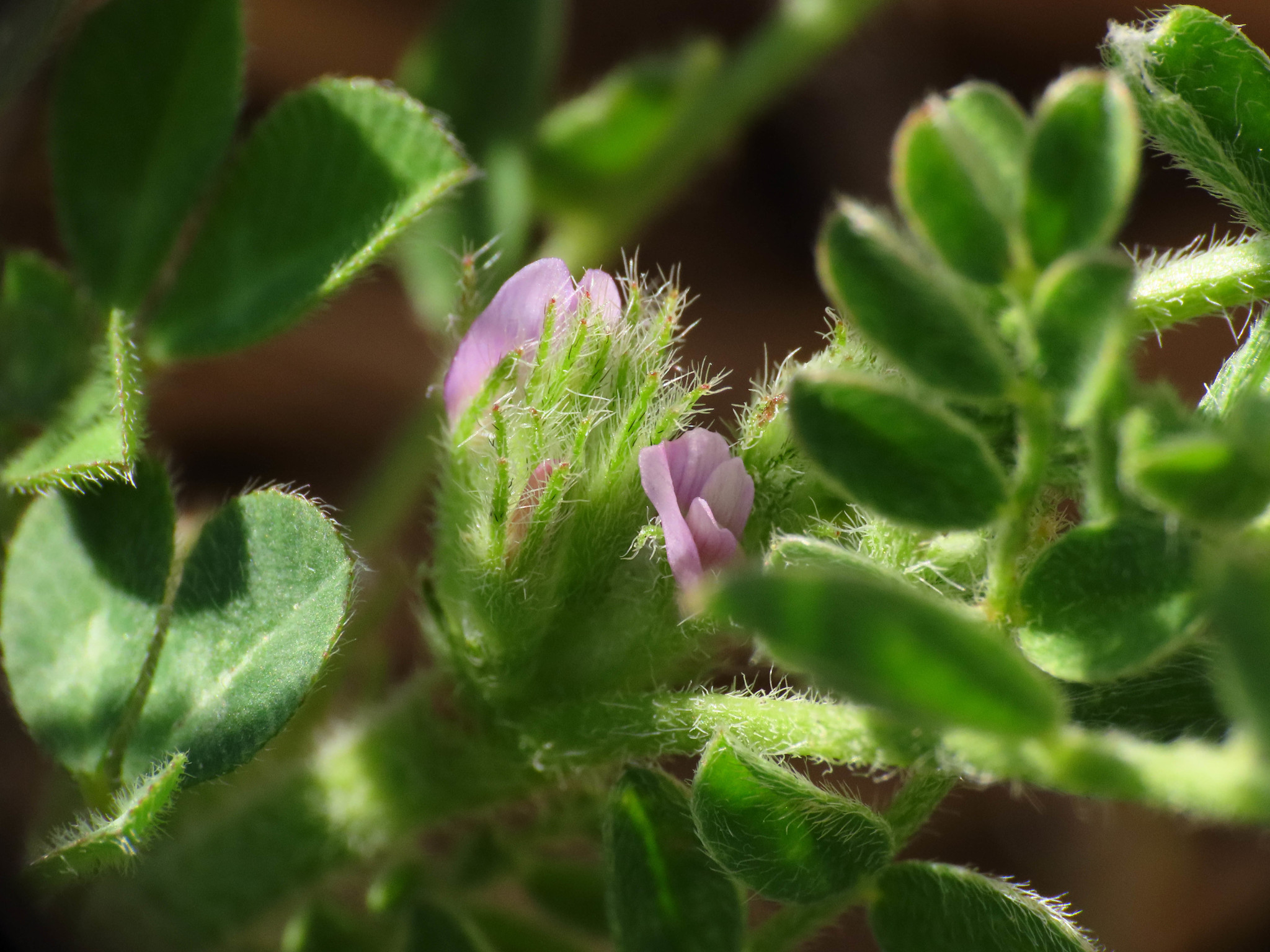
- In Italy

Scientific classification
- Kingdom: Plantae
- Clade: Embryophytes
- Clade: Tracheophytes
- Clade: Angiosperms
- Clade: Eudicots
- Clade: Rosids
- Order: Fabales
- Family: Fabaceae
- Subfamily: Faboideae
- Genus: Astragalus
- Species: A. sesameus

Binomial name
- Astragalus sesameus L.

Synonyms
- Stella sesamea (L.) Medik.; Tragacantha sesamea (L.) Kuntze; Astragalus annuus DC.; Astragalus malacensis Salzm. ex Bunge

= Astragalus sesameus =

Species of plant

Astragalus sesameus is a species of plant in the family Fabaceae. It is native to Europe, North Africa and Western Asia.

== Sources ==
This article incorporates text from a free content work. Licensed under CC0 (license statement/permission). Text taken from Astragalus sesameus. Encyclopedia of Life.
