= H. formosa =

H. formosa may refer to:

- Halgerda formosa, a sea slug
- Hebe formosa, a plant endemic to Tasmania
- Heterandria formosa, an ovoviviparous fish
