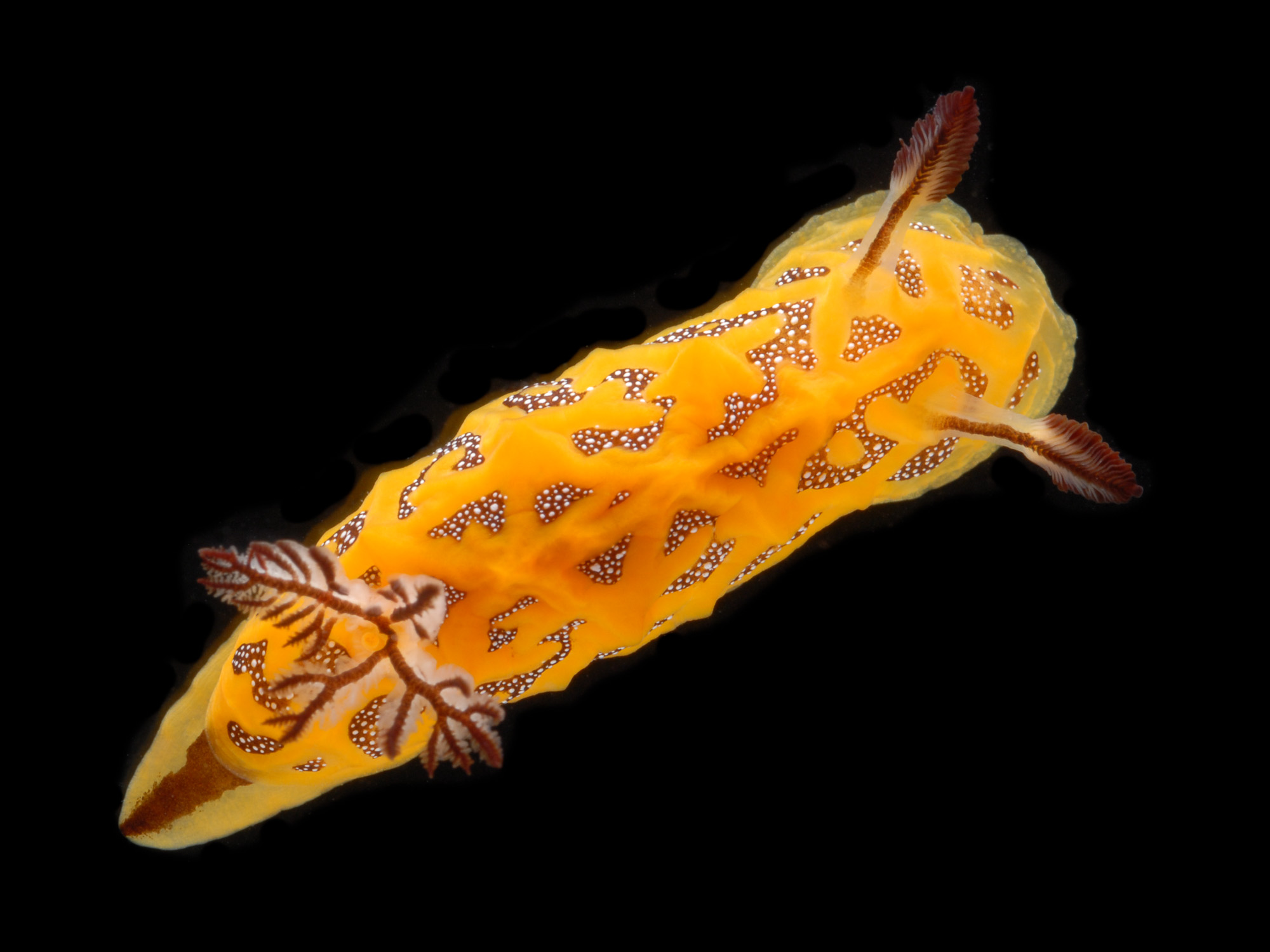
- Nomad, Diani, Kenya.

Scientific classification
- Kingdom: Animalia
- Phylum: Mollusca
- Class: Gastropoda
- Order: Nudibranchia
- Family: Discodorididae
- Genus: Halgerda
- Species: H. indotessellata

Binomial name
- Halgerda indotessellata Tibiriçá, Pola & Cervera, 2018

= Halgerda indotessellata =

Species of gastropod

Halgerda indotessellata is a species of sea slug, a dorid nudibranch, a shell-less marine gastropod mollusk in the family Discodorididae.

== Distribution ==
This species was described from a specimen collected at Paindane, Mozambique, 24.224167°S 35.428333°E at depth of 20–25 m (66–82 ft). It has frequently been identified in the Indian Ocean as the Pacific Ocean species Halgerda tessellata.
