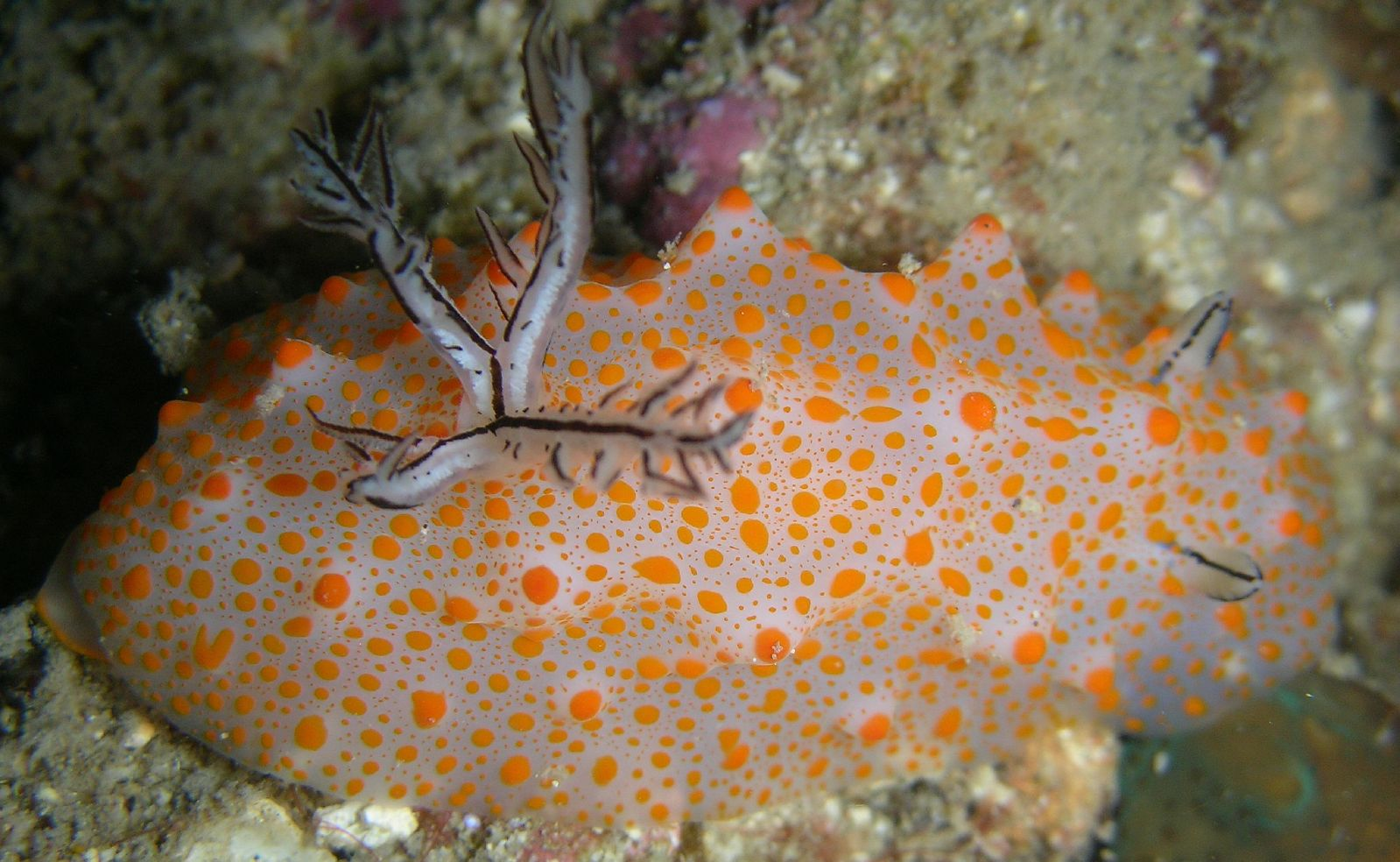
- Halgerda stricklandi

Scientific classification
- Kingdom: Animalia
- Phylum: Mollusca
- Class: Gastropoda
- Order: Nudibranchia
- Family: Discodorididae
- Genus: Halgerda; Bergh, 1880

Type species
- Halgerda formosa Bergh, 1880

= Halgerda =

Genus of gastropods

Halgerda is a genus of sea slugs, dorid nudibranchs, shell-less marine gastropod mollusks in the family Discodorididae.

== Taxonomy ==
The genus Halgerda was classified within the family Halgerdidae by Odhner (1934). Halgerdidae Odhner, 1926, is treated as a synonym of Discodorididae in the taxonomy of Bouchet & Rocroi (2005). See also Valdés (2002). Seven species of Halgerda were described in the years 1880–1905, two species in 1932–1949, four species from 1975 to 1982, then 22 species in the years 1993–2001. In 2018 another six new species were described from Mozambique, highlighting the number of undescribed species on the African coast of the Indian Ocean. A number of undescribed species are known and many species show considerable variation across their ranges, which may indicate that more cryptic species exist.

== Distribution ==
Species of Halgerda are confined to the Indo-West Pacific Tropical region apart from two species which are found in warm temperate waters of South Africa and Southern Australia and one species from warm temperate Japanese waters.

== Species ==
Species within the genus Halgerda include:

- Halgerda abyssicola Fahey & Gosliner, 2000
- Halgerda albocristata Gosliner & Fahey, 1998
- Halgerda anosy Donohoo & Gosliner, 2023
- Halgerda aurantiomaculata (J. K. Allan, 1932)
- Halgerda azteca Fahey & Gosliner, 2000
- Halgerda bacalusia Fahey & Gosliner, 1999
- Halgerda batangas Carlson & Hoff, 2000
- Halgerda berberiani Donohoo & Gosliner, 2023
- Halgerda biqiea Donohoo & Gosliner, 2023
- Halgerda brunneomaculata Carlson & Hoff, 1993
- Halgerda brycei Fahey & Gosliner, 2001
- Halgerda carlsoni Rudman, 1978
- Halgerda dalanghita Fahey & Gosliner, 1999
- Halgerda diaphana Fahey & Gosliner, 1999
- Halgerda dichromis Fahey & Gosliner, 1999
- Halgerda fibra Fahey & Gosliner, 2000
- Halgerda formosa Bergh, 1880
- Halgerda graphica Basedow & Hedley, 1905
- Halgerda guahan Carlson & Hoff, 1993
- Halgerda gunnessi Fahey & Gosliner, 2001
- Halgerda hervei Donohoo & Gosliner, 2023
- Halgerda indotessellata Tibiriçá, Pola & Cervera, 2018
- Halgerda iota Yonow, 1994
- Halgerda jennyae Tibiriçá, Pola & Cervera, 2018
- Halgerda johnsonorum Carlson & Hoff, 2000
- Halgerda labyrinthus Donohoo & Gosliner, 2023
- Halgerda leopardalis Tibiriçá, Pola & Cervera, 2018
- Halgerda maaikeae Donohoo & Gosliner, 2023
- Halgerda malesso Carlson & Hoff, 1993
- Halgerda mango Donohoo & Gosliner, 2023
- Halgerda maricola Fahey & Gosliner, 2001
- Halgerda meringuecitrea Tibiriçá, Pola & Cervera, 2018
- Halgerda mesophotica Donohoo & Gosliner, 2023
- Halgerda mozambiquensis Tibiriçá, Pola & Cervera, 2018
- Halgerda nuarrensis Tibiriçá, Pola & Cervera, 2018
- Halgerda okinawa Carlson & Hoff, 2000
- Halgerda onna Fahey & Gosliner, 2001
- Halgerda orientalis G.-Y. Lin, 1991
- Halgerda orstomi Fahey & Gosliner, 2000
- Halgerda paliensis (Bertsch & S. Johnson, 1982)
- Halgerda pattiae Donohoo & Gosliner, 2023
- Halgerda paulayi Donohoo & Gosliner, 2023
- Halgerda profunda Donohoo & Gosliner, 2023
- Halgerda punctata Farran, 1902
- Halgerda radamaensis Donohoo & Gosliner, 2023
- Halgerda scripta Donohoo & Gosliner, 2023
- Halgerda stricklandi Fahey & Gosliner, 1999
- Halgerda takipsilim Donohoo & Gosliner, 2023
- Halgerda terramtuentis Bertsch & S. Johnson, 1982
- Halgerda tessellata (Bergh, 1880)
- Halgerda theobroma Fahey & Gosliner, 2001
- Halgerda toliara Fahey & Gosliner, 1999
- Halgerda wasinensis Eliot, 1904
- Halgerda willeyi Eliot, 1904
- Halgerda xishaensis G.-Y. Lin, 1975
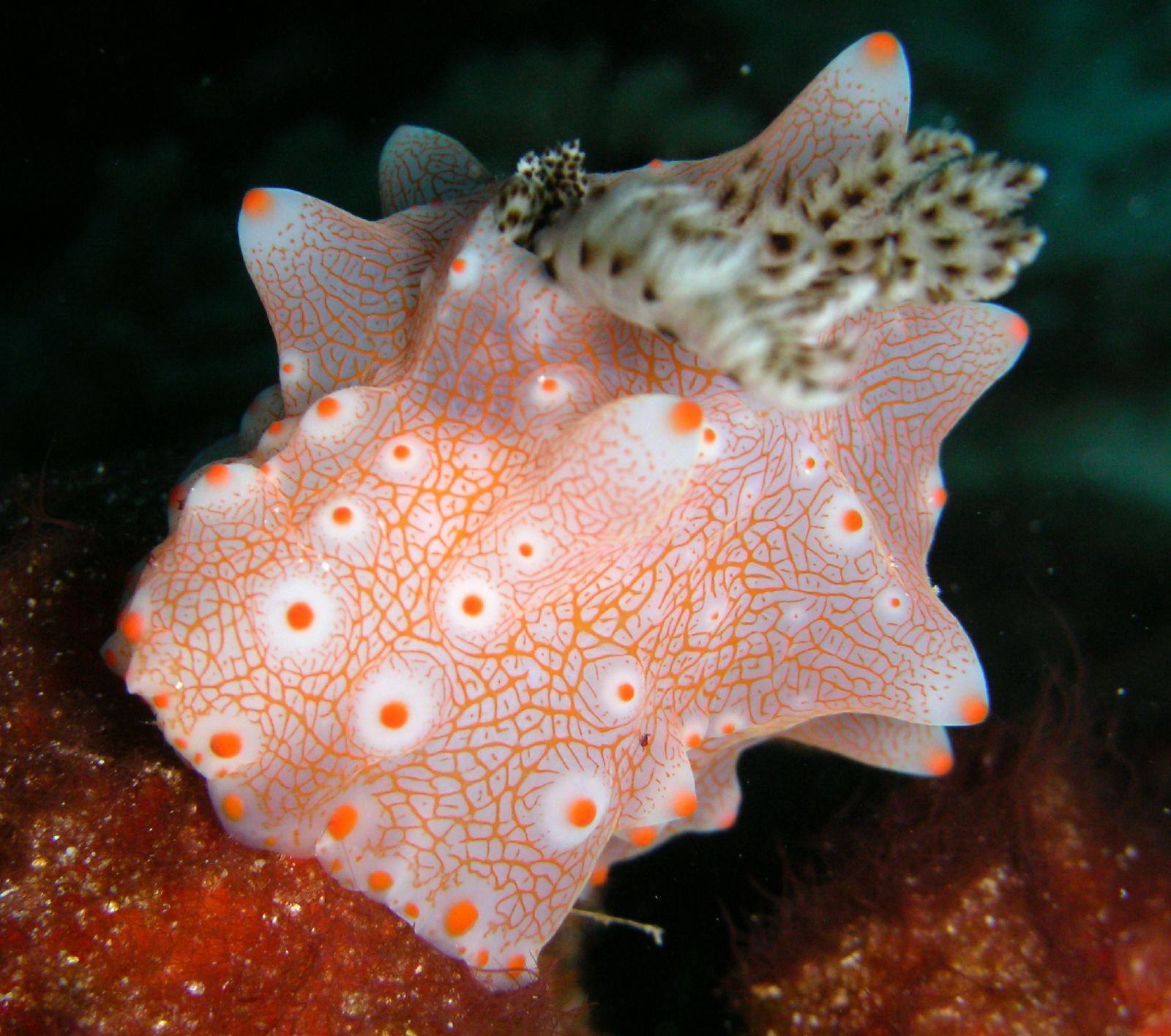
Halgerda batangas

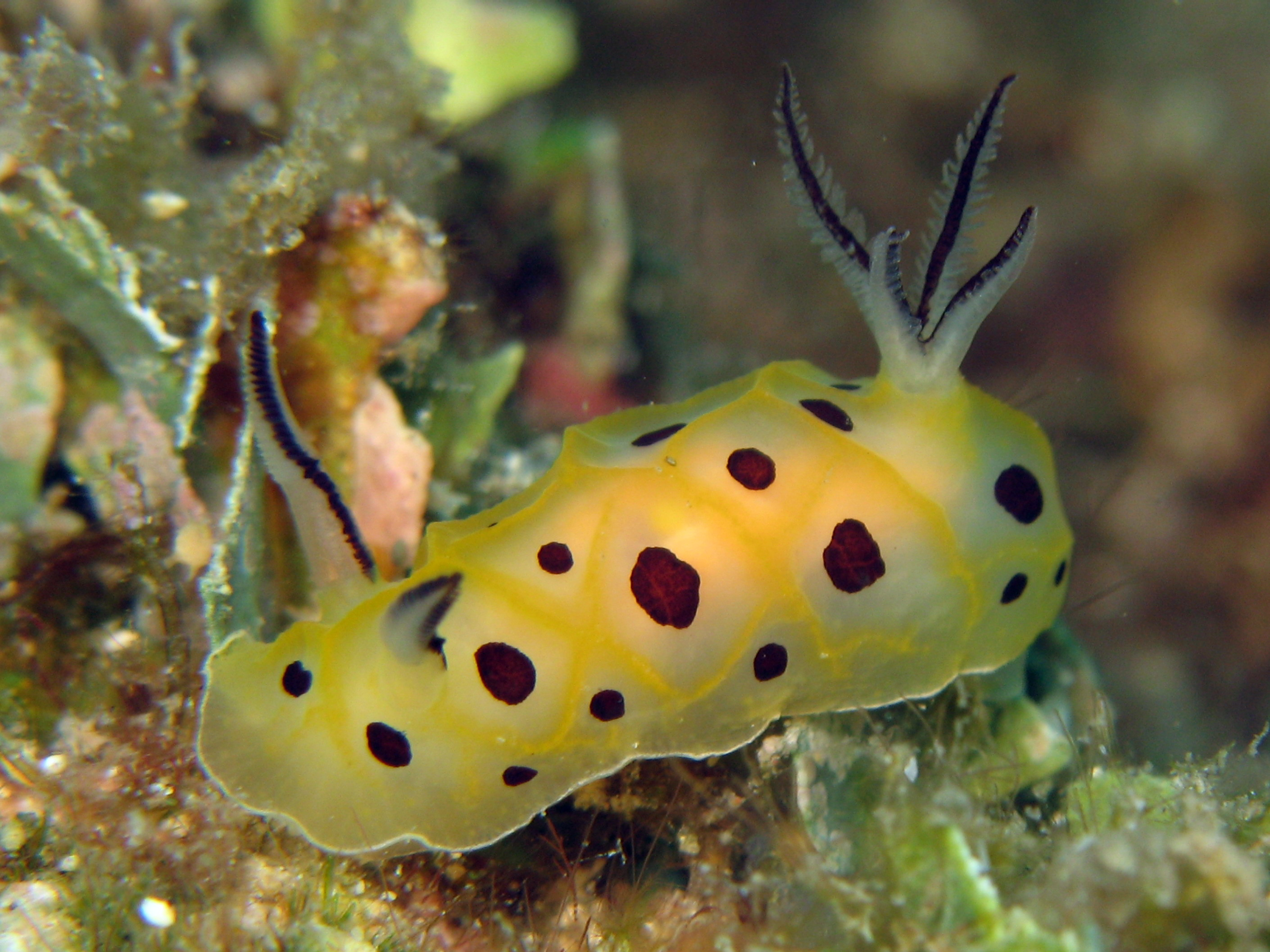
Halgerda brunneomaculata

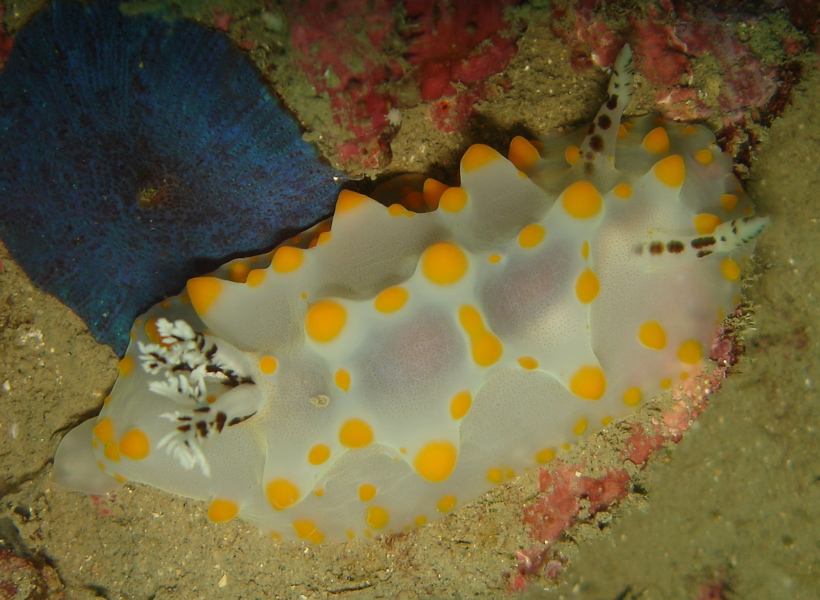
Halgerda carlsoni

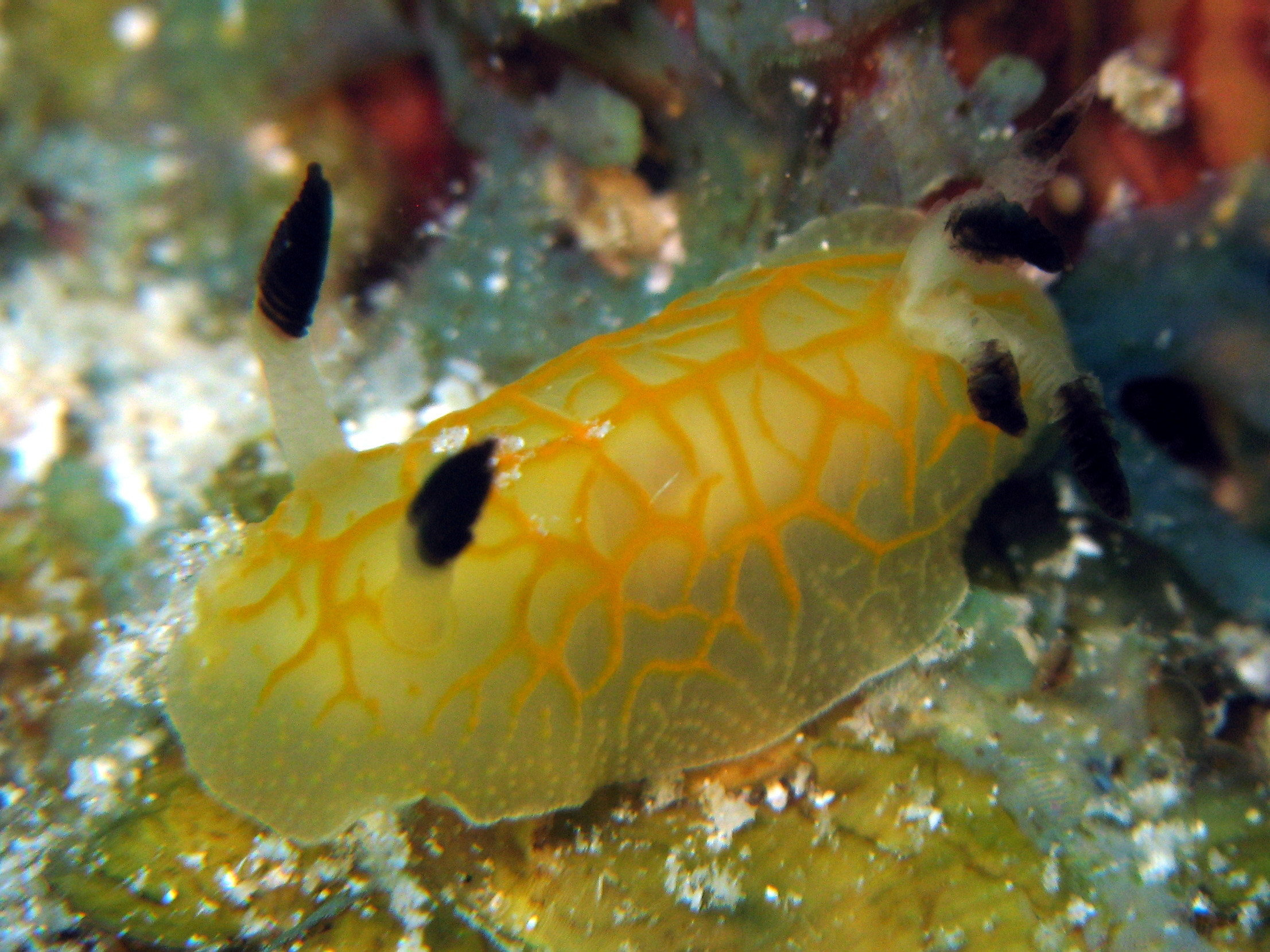
Halgerda formosa

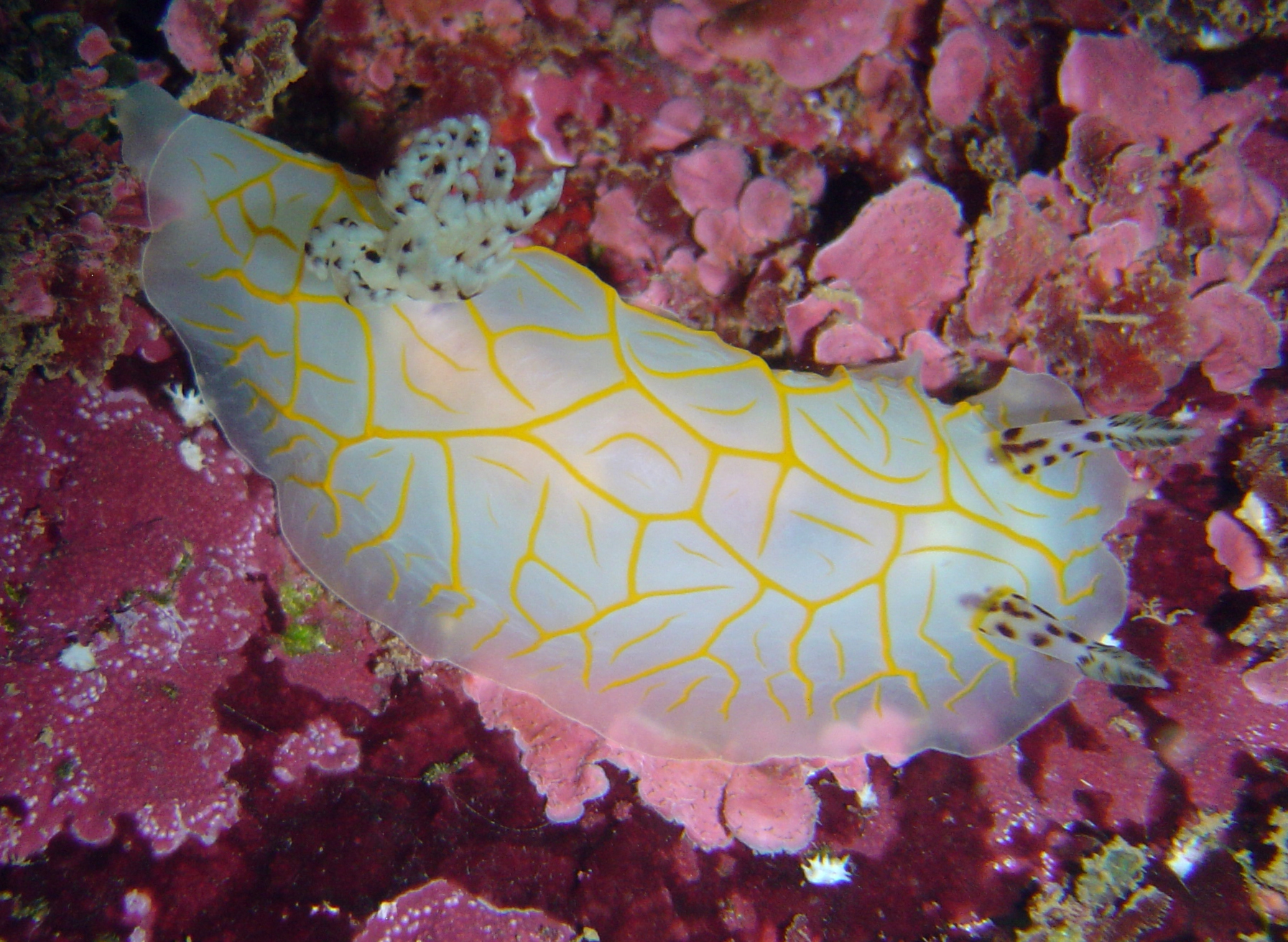
Halgerda guahan

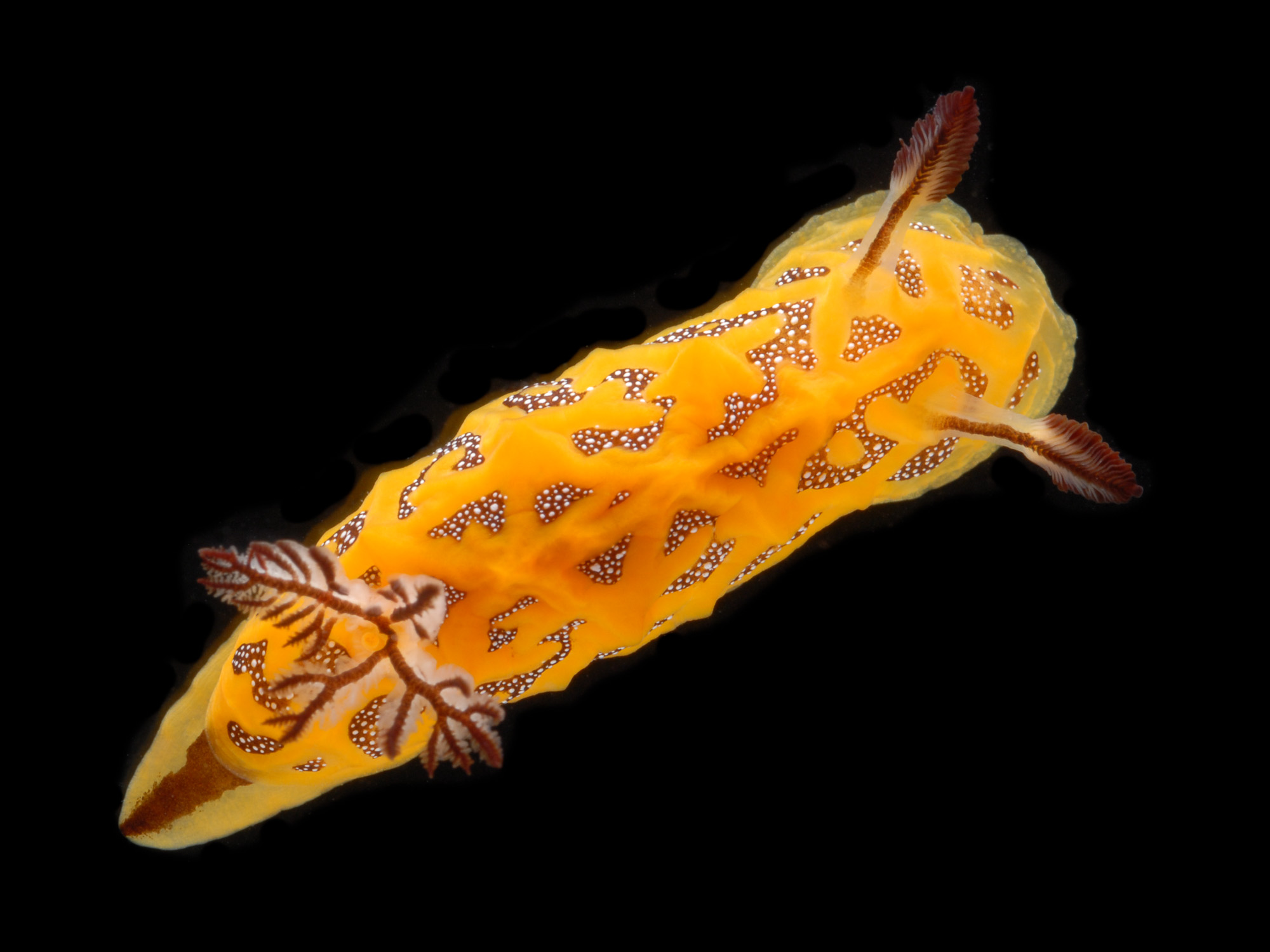
Halgerda indotesselata

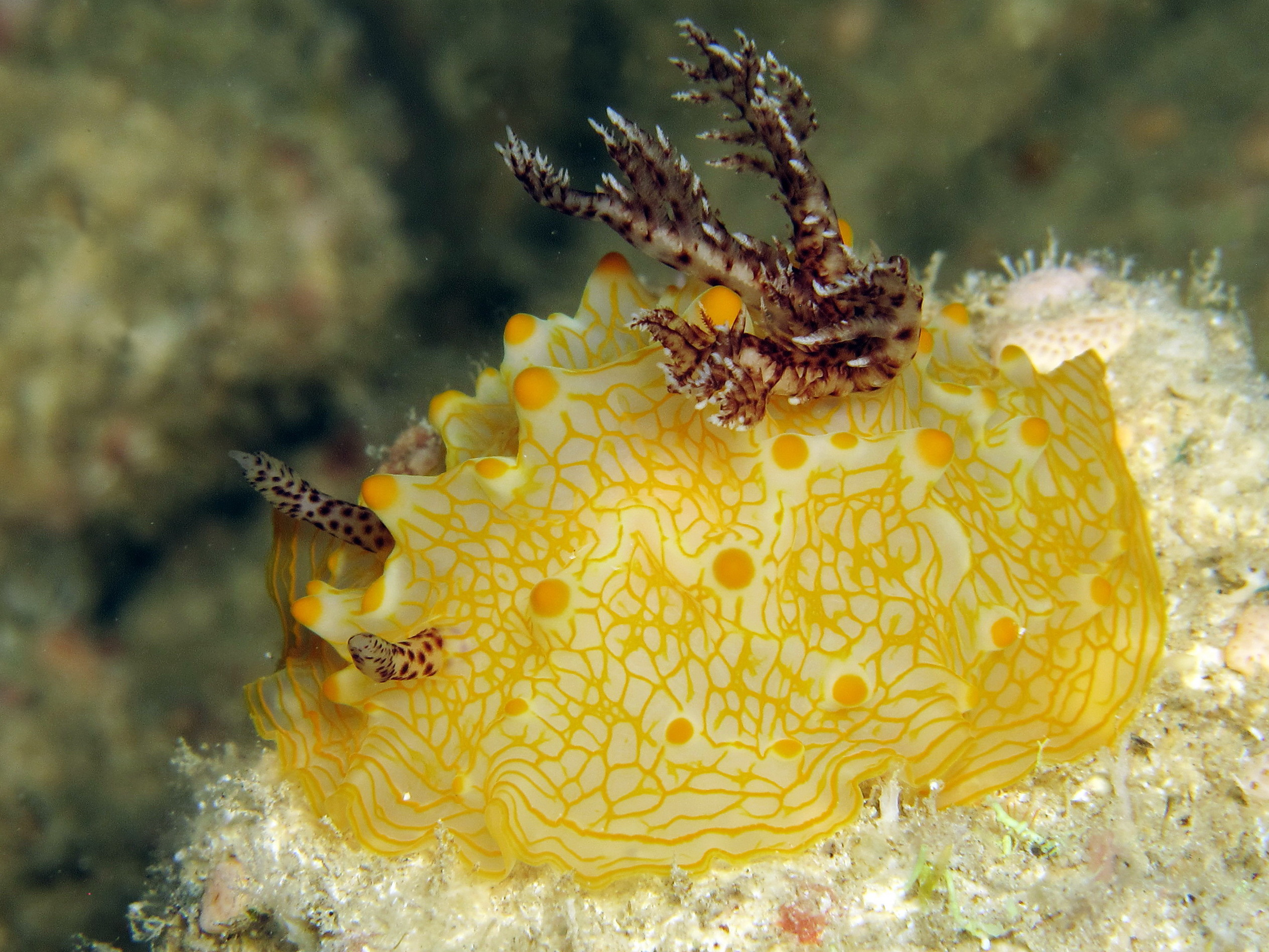
Halgerda malesso

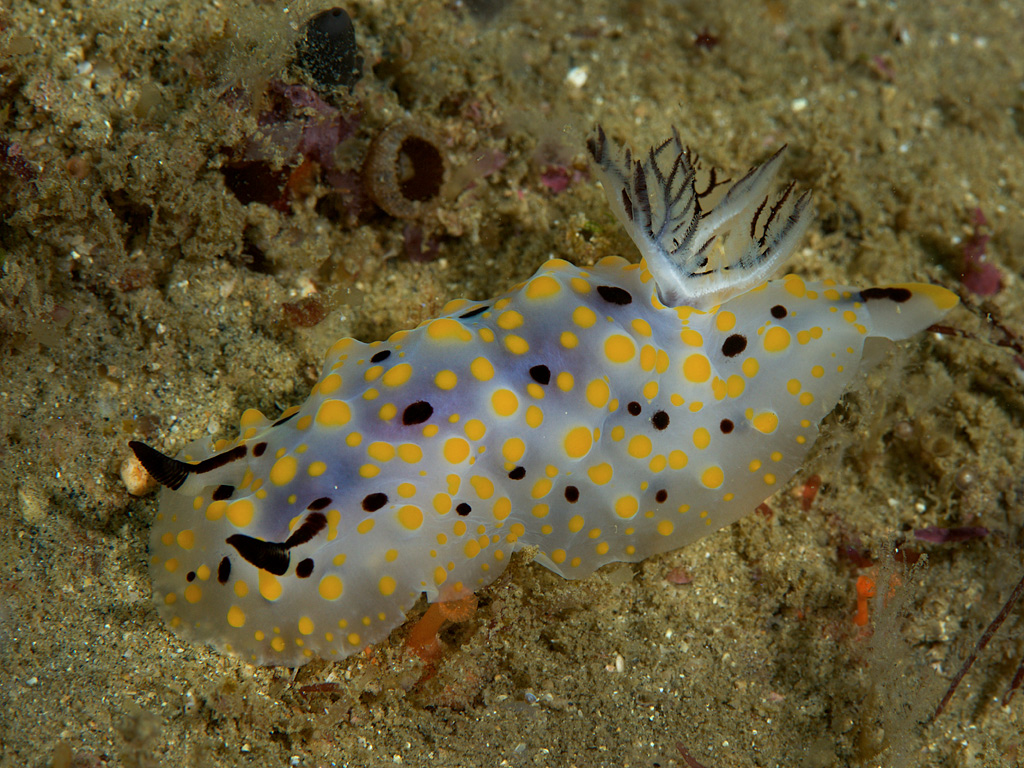
Halgerda punctata

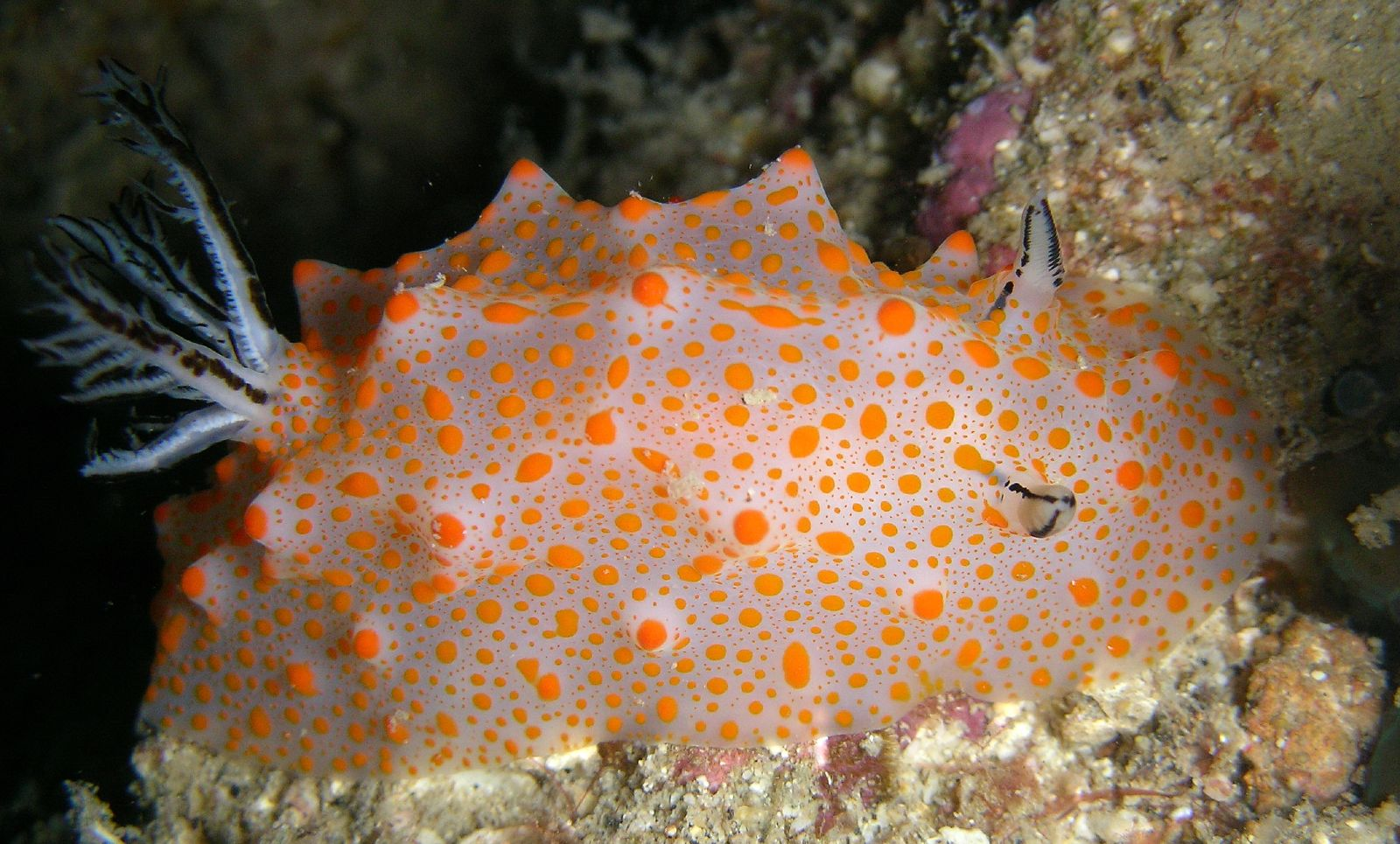
Halgerda stricklandi

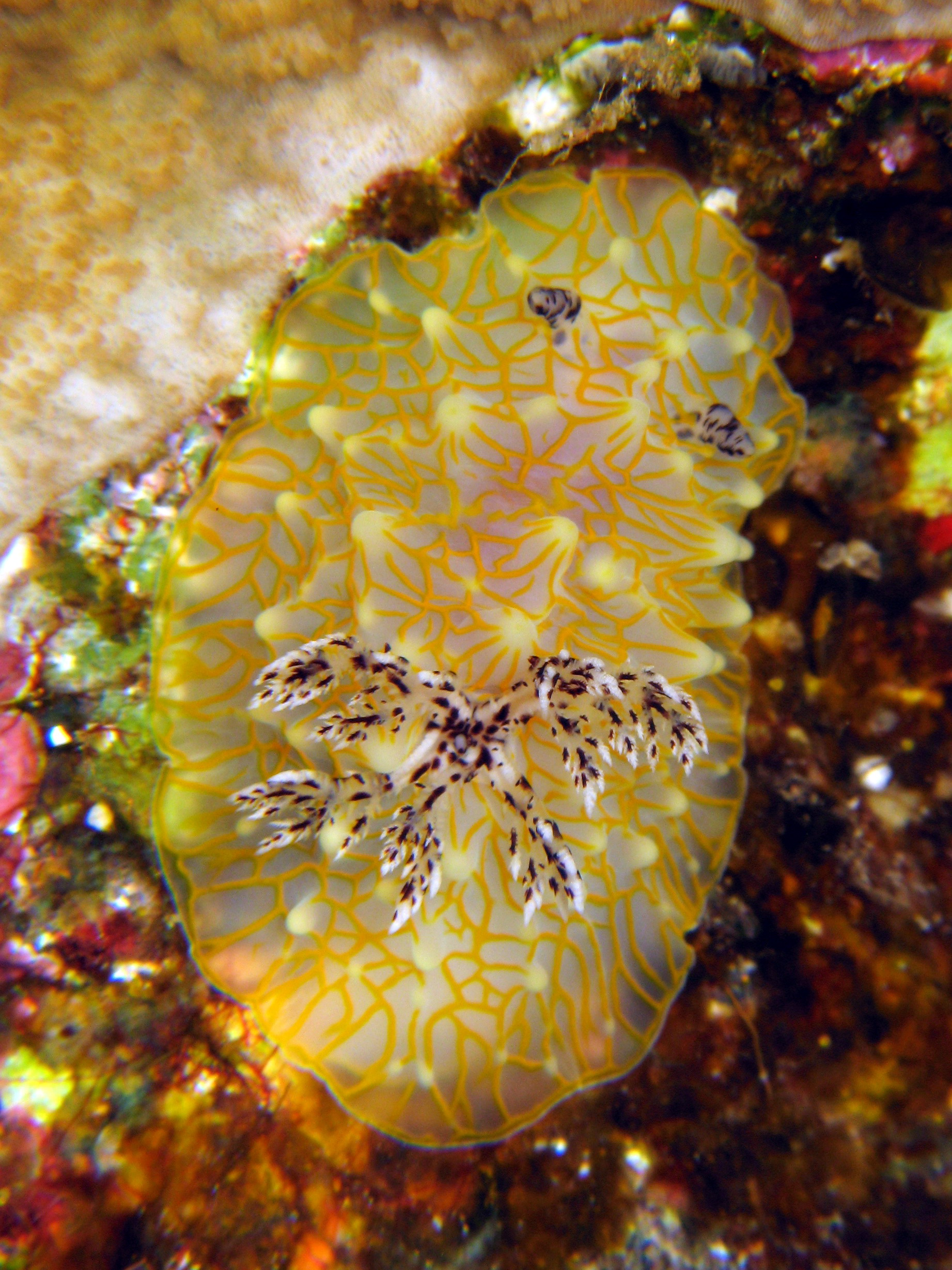
Halgerda terramtuentis

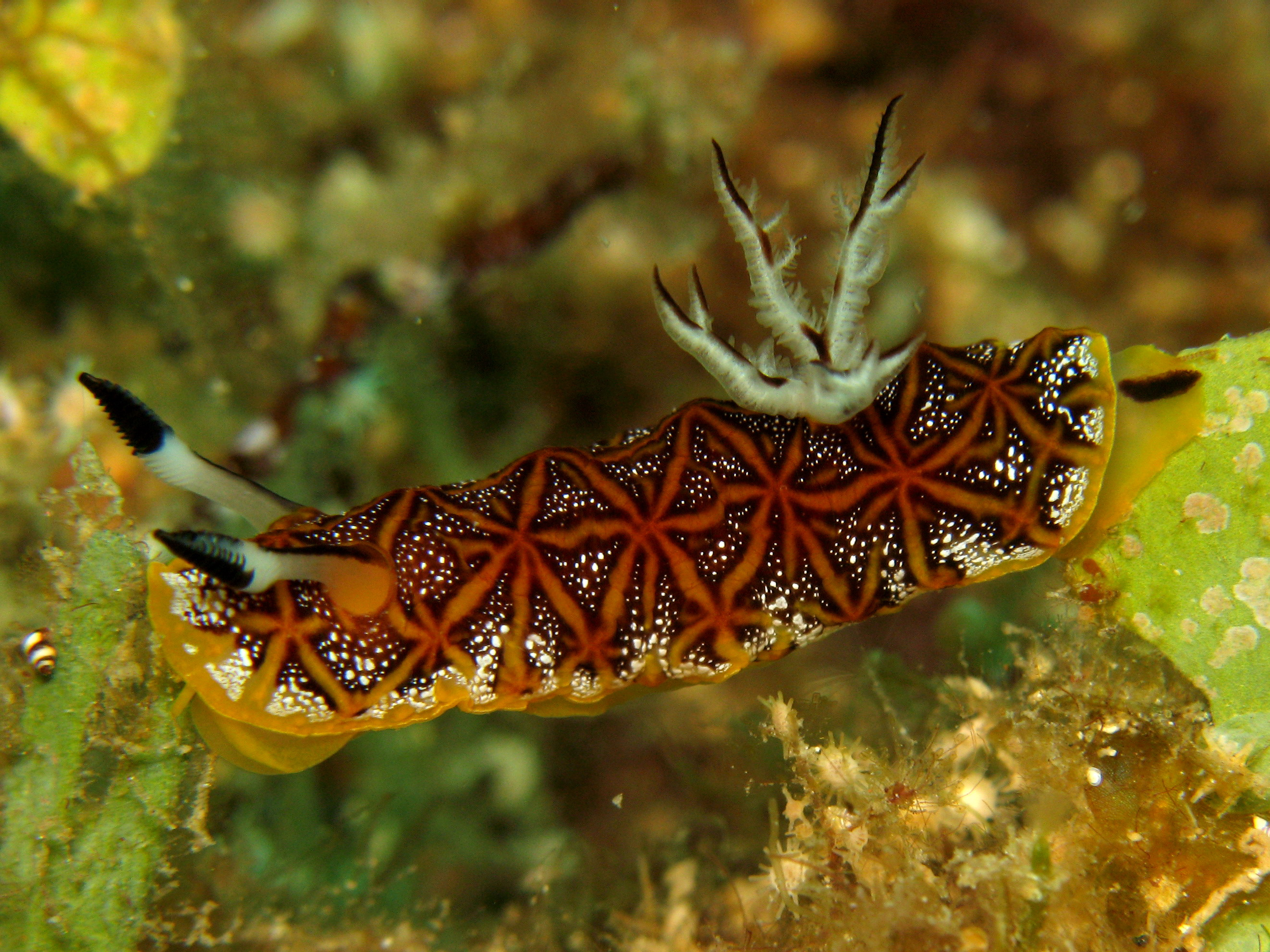
Halgerda tessellata

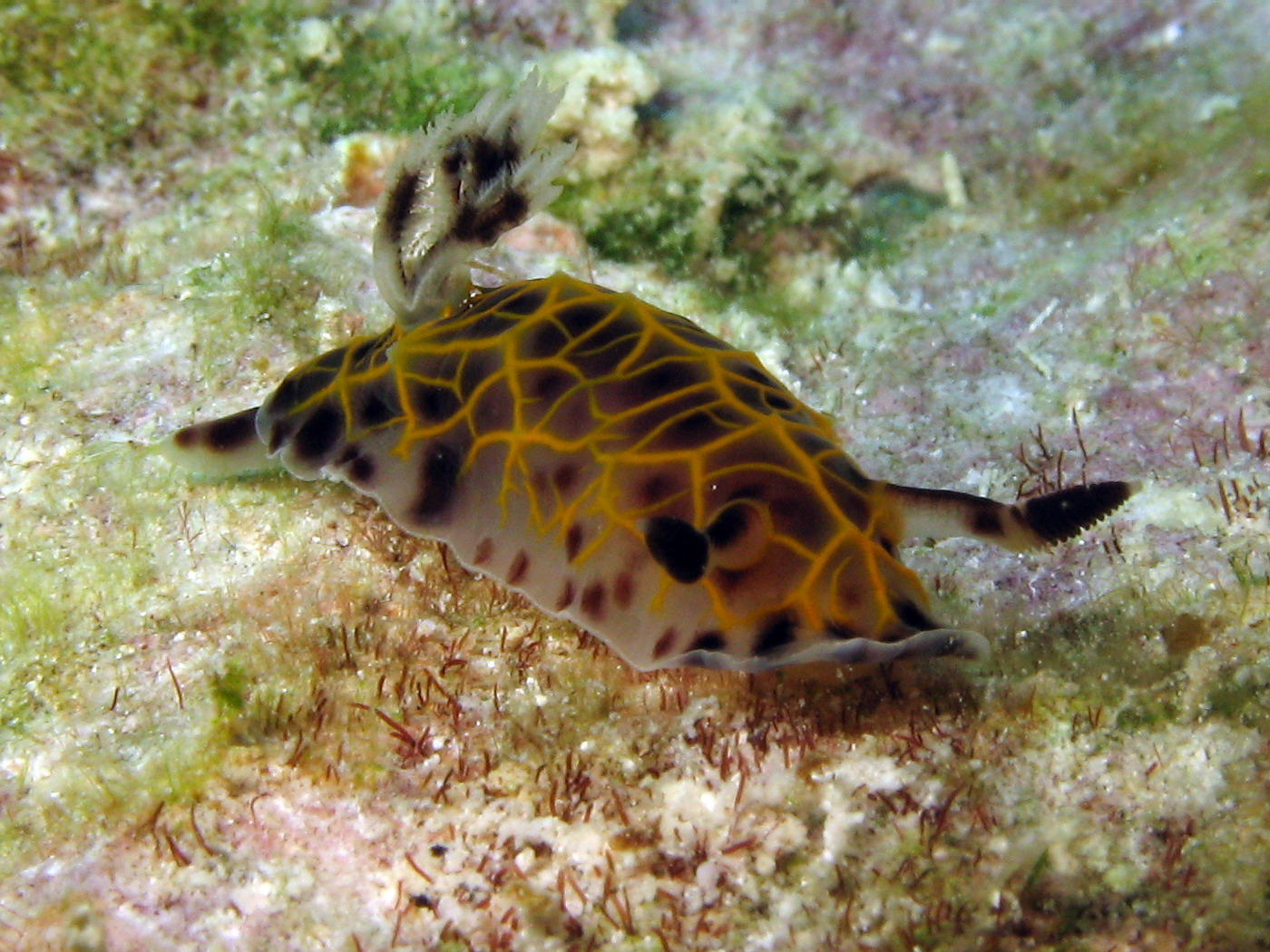
Halgerda wasinensis

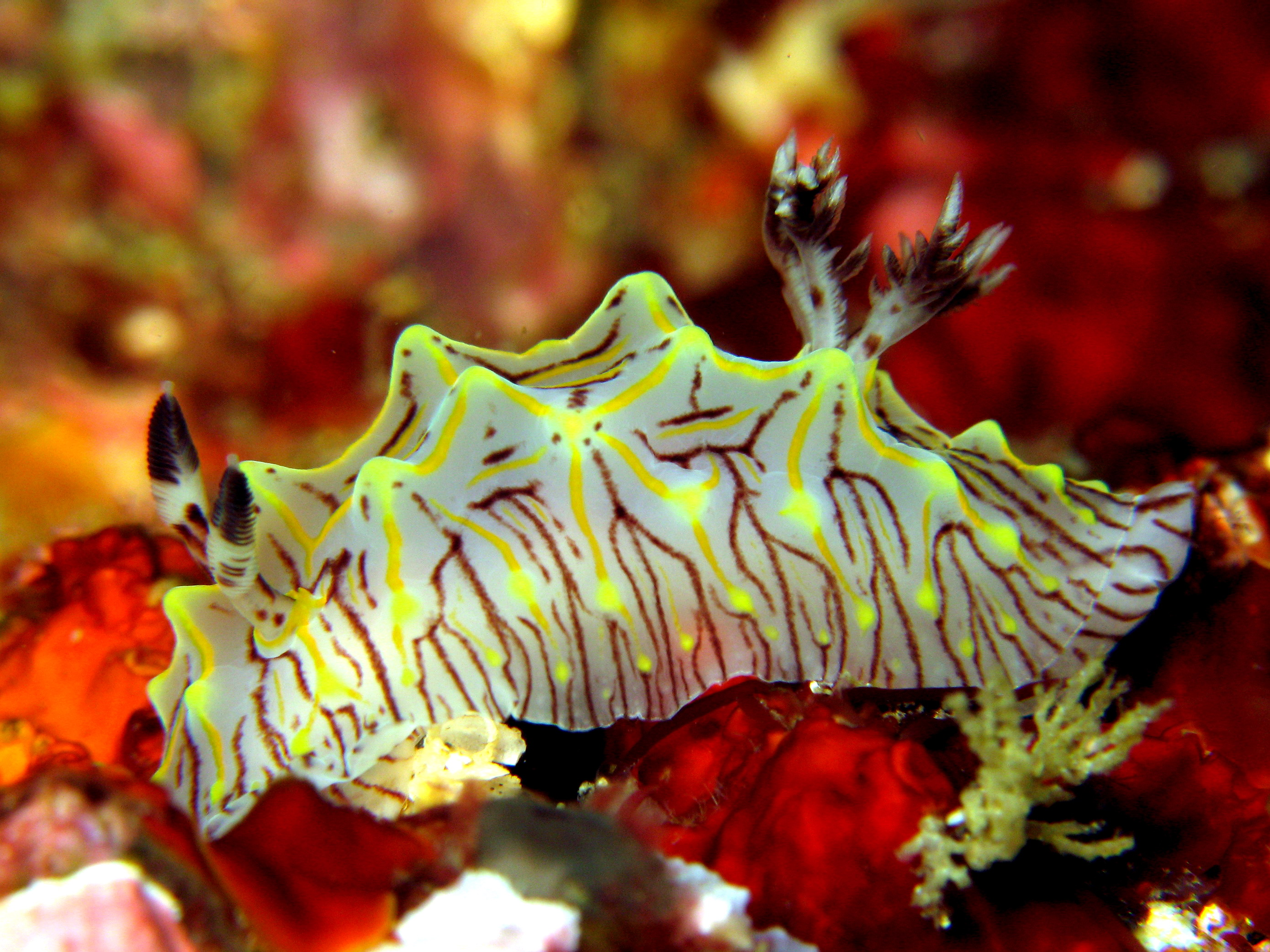
Halgerda willeyi
