= Halgerda orstomi =

Scientific classification
- Kingdom: Animalia
- Phylum: Mollusca
- Class: Gastropoda
- Order: Nudibranchia
- Family: Discodorididae
- Genus: Halgerda
- Species: H. orstomi

Binomial name
- Halgerda orstomi Fahey & Gosliner, 2000

Species of gastropod

Halgerda orstomi is a species of sea slug, a dorid nudibranch, a shell-less marine gastropod mollusk in the family Discodorididae.

== Distribution ==
This species was described from a specimen collected at Vanuatu at depths of 235–251 m and three Paratypes from the same area. Additional specimens included in the original description are from the Philippines and New Caledonia at depths of 92–120 m.
