= Halgerda meringuecitrea =

Scientific classification
- Kingdom: Animalia
- Phylum: Mollusca
- Class: Gastropoda
- Order: Nudibranchia
- Family: Discodorididae
- Genus: Halgerda
- Species: H. meringuecitrea

Binomial name
- Halgerda meringuecitrea Tibiriçá, Pola & Cervera, 2018

Species of gastropod

Halgerda meringuecitrea is a species of sea slug, a dorid nudibranch, a shell-less marine gastropod mollusk in the family Discodorididae.

== Distribution ==
This species was described from a specimen collected at Zavora, Mozambique, 24.564444°S 35.290833°E at depth of 33 m (108 ft) and five other specimens collected nearby.
