= Halgerda brycei =

Scientific classification
- Kingdom: Animalia
- Phylum: Mollusca
- Class: Gastropoda
- Order: Nudibranchia
- Family: Discodorididae
- Genus: Halgerda
- Species: H. brycei

Binomial name
- Halgerda brycei Fahey & Gosliner, 2001

Species of gastropod

Halgerda brycei is a species of sea slug, a dorid nudibranch, shell-less marine gastropod mollusks in the family Discodorididae.

== Distribution ==
This species was described from Western Australia.
