= Halgerda gunnessi =

Halgerda brycei

Scientific classification
- Kingdom: Animalia
- Phylum: Mollusca
- Class: Gastropoda
- Order: Nudibranchia
- Family: Discodorididae
- Genus: Halgerda
- Species: H. gunnessi

Binomial name
- Halgerda gunnessi Fahey & Gosliner, 2001

Species of gastropod

Halgerda gunnessi is a species of sea slug, a dorid nudibranch, a shell-less marine gastropod mollusk in the family Discodorididae.

== Distribution ==
This species was described from Western Australia.
