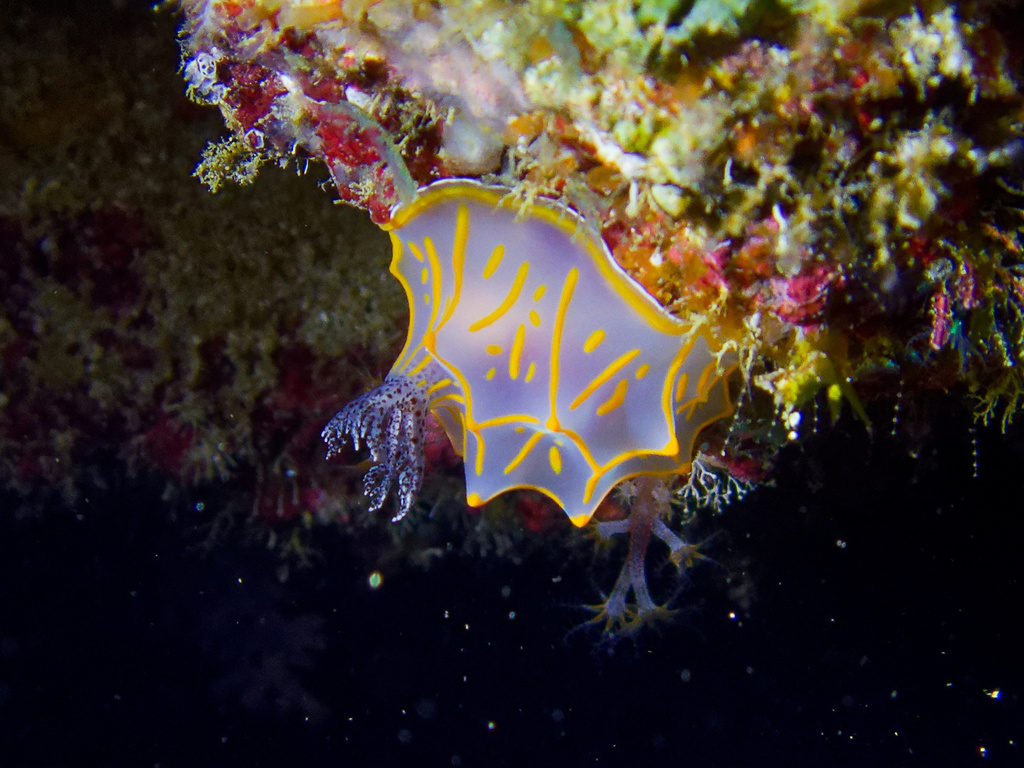

Scientific classification
- Kingdom: Animalia
- Phylum: Mollusca
- Class: Gastropoda
- Order: Nudibranchia
- Family: Discodorididae
- Genus: Halgerda
- Species: H. diaphana

Binomial name
- Halgerda diaphana Fahey & Gosliner, 1999

= Halgerda diaphana =

Species of gastropod

Halgerda diaphana is a species of sea slug, a dorid nudibranch, shell-less marine gastropod mollusks in the family Discodorididae.

== Distribution ==
This species was originally described from numerous specimens collected in Okinawa Island, Japan. It has subsequently been found several times at the nearby Kerama Islands. Also been found in Dauin, Negros, Philippines.
