= Halgerda azteca =

Scientific classification
- Kingdom: Animalia
- Phylum: Mollusca
- Class: Gastropoda
- Order: Nudibranchia
- Family: Discodorididae
- Genus: Halgerda
- Species: H. azteca

Binomial name
- Halgerda azteca Fahey & Gosliner, 2000

Species of gastropod

Halgerda azteca is a species of sea slug, a dorid nudibranch, shell-less marine gastropod mollusks in the family Discodorididae.

== Distribution ==
This species was described from 3 specimens collected at Banc Aztèque, and Banc Jumeau east, Norfolk Ridge, New Caledonia in depths of 230–367 m.
