= Halgerda abyssicola =

Scientific classification
- Kingdom: Animalia
- Phylum: Mollusca
- Class: Gastropoda
- Order: Nudibranchia
- Family: Discodorididae
- Genus: Halgerda
- Species: H. abyssicola

Binomial name
- Halgerda abyssicola Fahey & Gosliner, 2000

Species of gastropod

Halgerda abyssicola is a species of sea slug, a dorid nudibranch, a shell-less marine gastropod mollusk in the family Discodorididae.

== Distribution ==
This species was described from a specimen collected at Vanuatu at depths of 207–280 m. An additional specimen included in the original description is from Bank Nova, Coral Sea at depths of 385–420 m.
