= Halgerda mozambiquensis =

Scientific classification
- Kingdom: Animalia
- Phylum: Mollusca
- Class: Gastropoda
- Order: Nudibranchia
- Family: Discodorididae
- Genus: Halgerda
- Species: H. mozambiquensis

Binomial name
- Halgerda mozambiquensis Tibiriçá, Pola & Cervera, 2018

Species of gastropod

Halgerda mozambiquensis is a species of sea slug, a dorid nudibranch, a shell-less marine gastropod mollusk in the family Discodorididae.

== Distribution ==
This species was described from a specimen collected at Zavora, Mozambique, 24.558333°S 35.282000°E at depth of 32 m (105 ft) and a single other specimen collected nearby.
