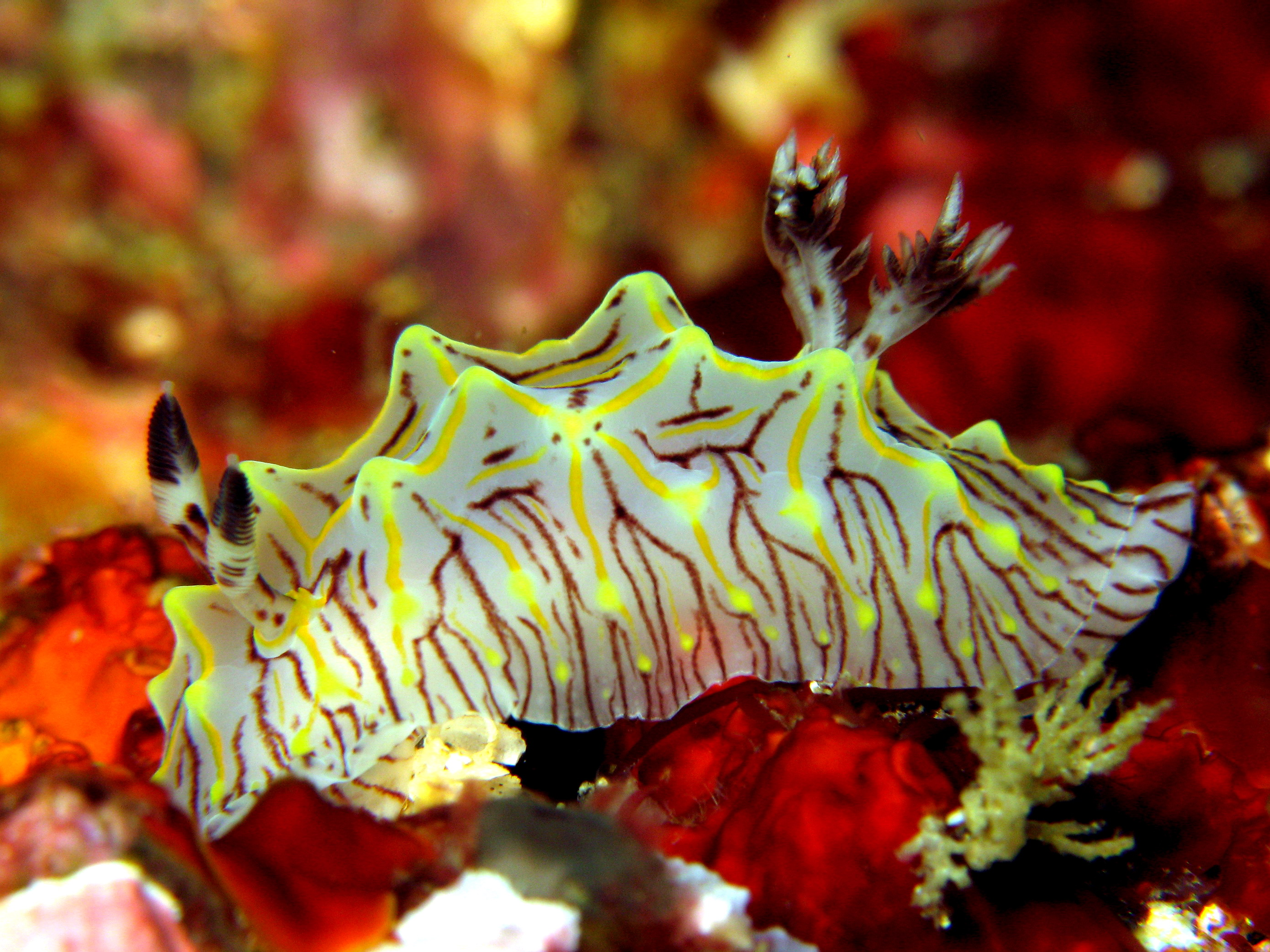

Scientific classification
- Kingdom: Animalia
- Phylum: Mollusca
- Class: Gastropoda
- Order: Nudibranchia
- Family: Discodorididae
- Genus: Halgerda
- Species: H. willeyi

Binomial name
- Halgerda willeyi Eliot, 1904

Synonyms
- Doris incii J. E. Gray, 1850 (nomen oblitum); Halgerda elegans Bergh, 1905

= Halgerda willeyi =

Species of gastropod

Halgerda willeyi is a species of sea slug. It is a dorid nudibranch, a shell-less marine gastropod mollusk in the family Discodorididae.

== Distribution ==
This species was described from a single specimen collected at Lifou, Loyalty Islands, by Dr A. Willey. Halgerda willeyi has been reported throughout the western Indo-Pacific, including Taiwan, Vietnam, Myanmar, Egypt, Indonesia, Malaysia and Australia and in the Red Sea.

== Description ==
The body of the Halgerda willeyi is rigid, with a series of acute interconnecting ridges. The ridges are topped with a yellow or orange line. The grooves between the ridges have chocolate brown lines and these lines extend right to the edge of the mantle as numerous radiating lines. This species is a fairly large halgerdid, and can reach 50 mm.

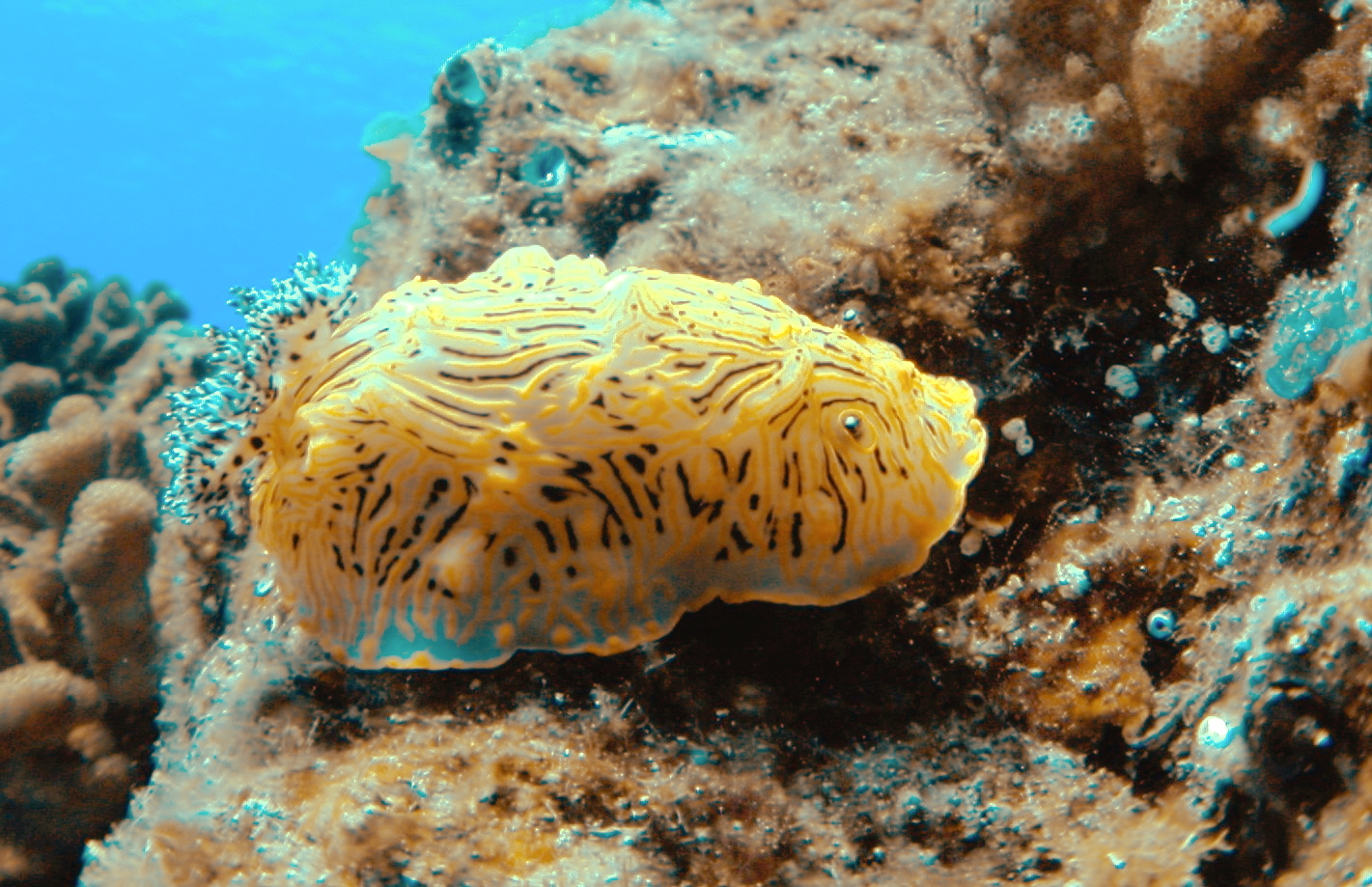
Halgerda willeyi
