= Halgerda paliensis =

Scientific classification
- Kingdom: Animalia
- Phylum: Mollusca
- Class: Gastropoda
- Order: Nudibranchia
- Family: Discodorididae
- Genus: Halgerda
- Species: H. paliensis

Binomial name
- Halgerda paliensis (Bertsch & Johnson, 1982)

Synonyms
- Sclerodoris paliensis Bertsch & Johnson, 1982

Species of gastropod

Halgerda paliensis is a species of sea slug, a dorid nudibranch, shell-less marine gastropod mollusks in the family Discodorididae.

== Taxonomic history ==
Originally described as Sclerodoris paliensis, this species was transferred to the genus Halgerda in 2001.

== Distribution ==
This species was described from Hawaii, where it is apparently endemic.
