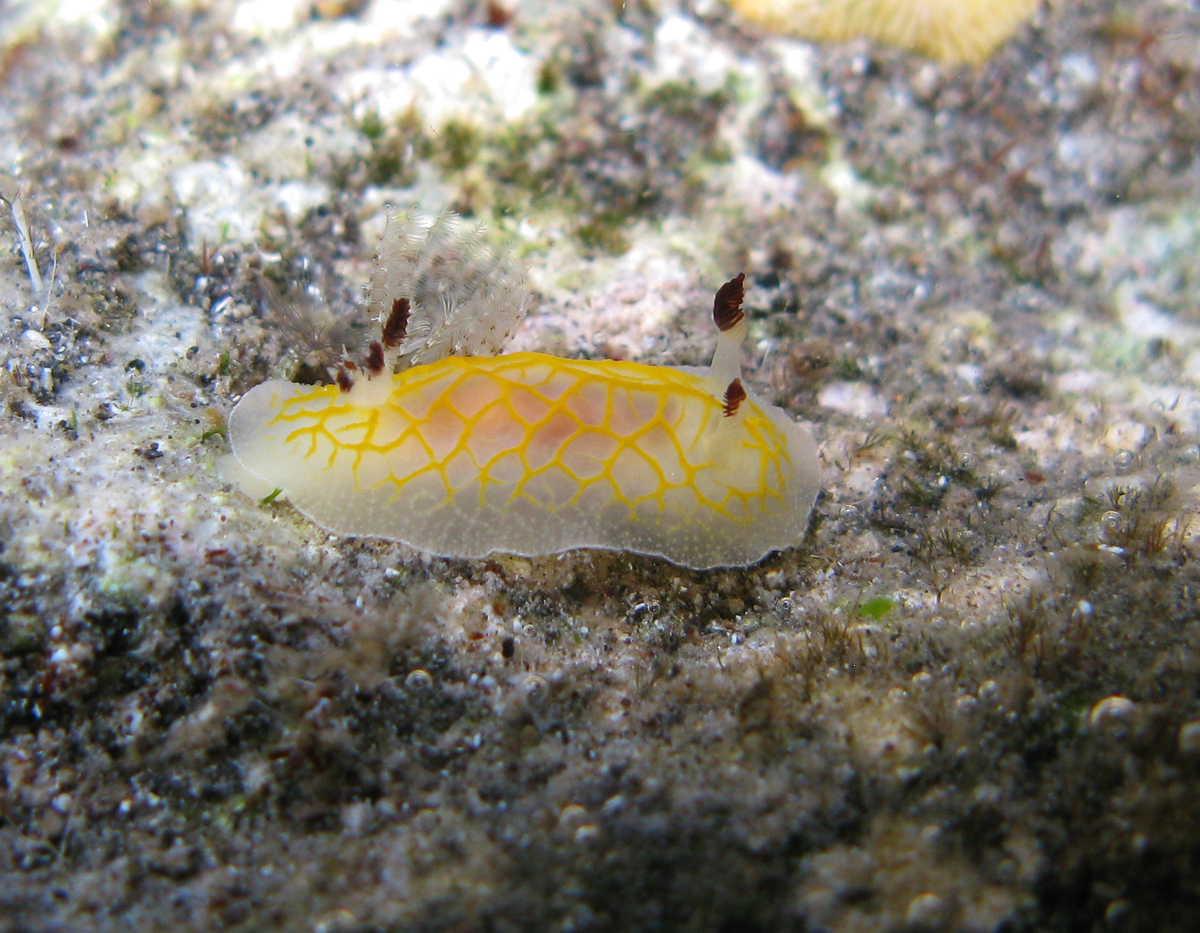
- The nudibranch Halgerda toliara, La Reunion, Indian Ocean.

Scientific classification
- Kingdom: Animalia
- Phylum: Mollusca
- Class: Gastropoda
- Order: Nudibranchia
- Family: Discodorididae
- Genus: Halgerda
- Species: H. toliara

Binomial name
- Halgerda toliara Fahey & Gosliner, 1999

= Halgerda toliara =

Species of gastropod

Halgerda toliara is a species of sea slug, a dorid nudibranch, shell-less marine gastropod mollusks in the family Discodorididae.

== Distribution ==
This species was described from Madagascar. It is also reported from Mayotte and South Africa.
