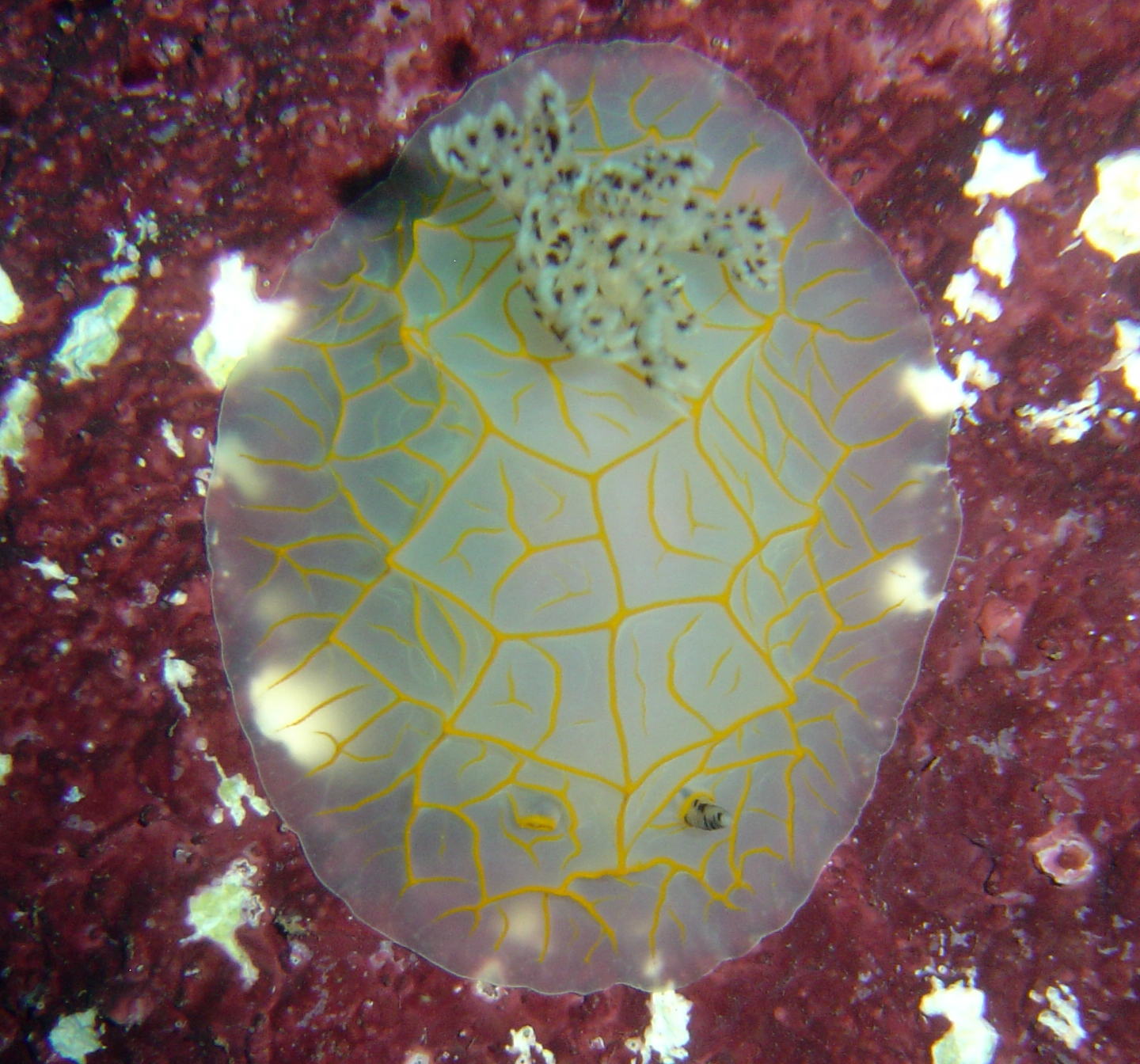

Scientific classification
- Kingdom: Animalia
- Phylum: Mollusca
- Class: Gastropoda
- Order: Nudibranchia
- Family: Discodorididae
- Genus: Halgerda
- Species: H. guahan

Binomial name
- Halgerda guahan Carlson & Hoff, 1993

= Halgerda guahan =

Species of gastropod

Halgerda guahan is a species of sea slug, a dorid nudibranch, a shell-less marine gastropod mollusk in the family Discodorididae.

== Distribution ==
This species was described from Guam, Mariana Islands. It has also been reported from Saipan in the northern Mariana Islands.

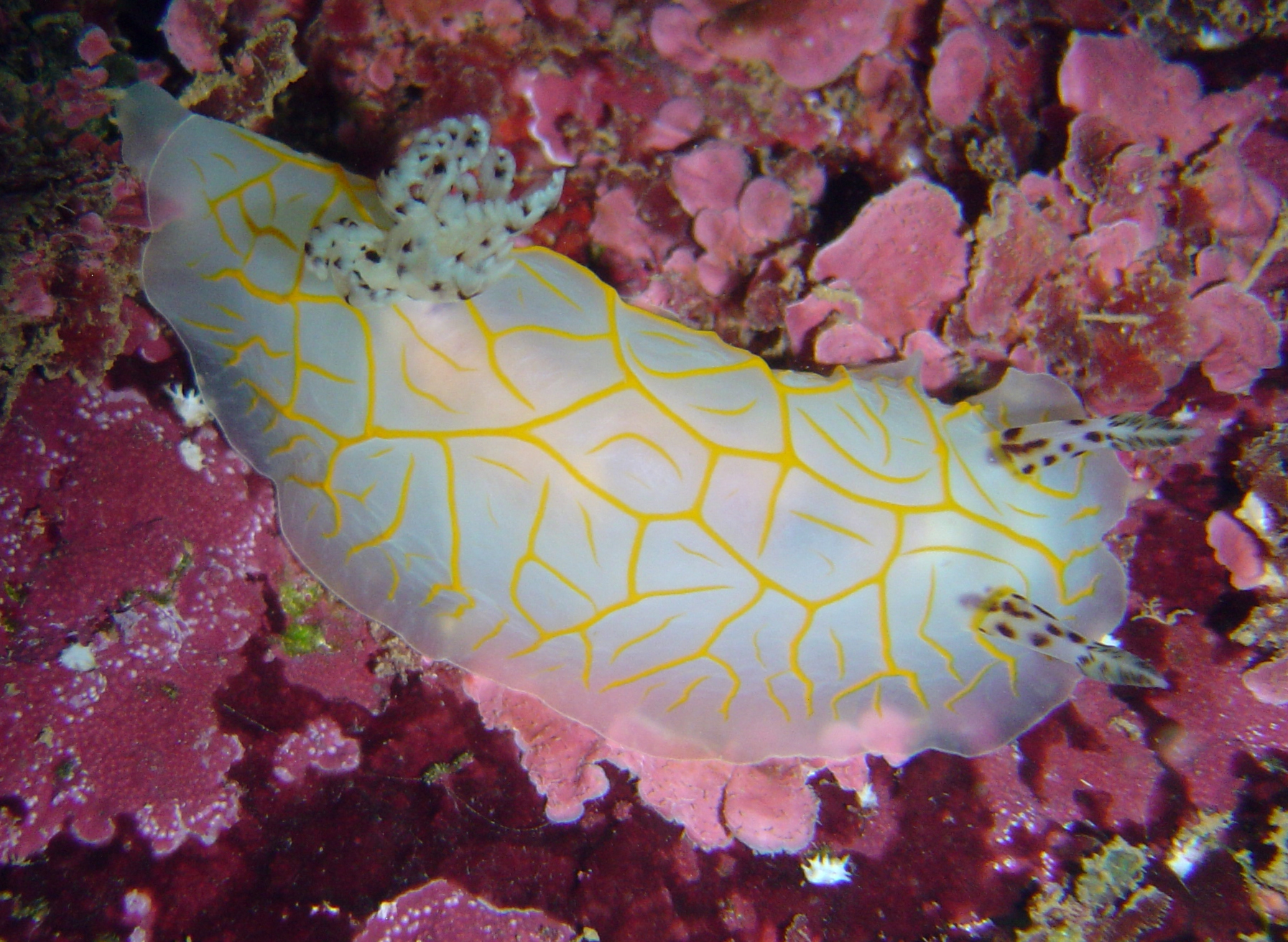
Halgerda guahan

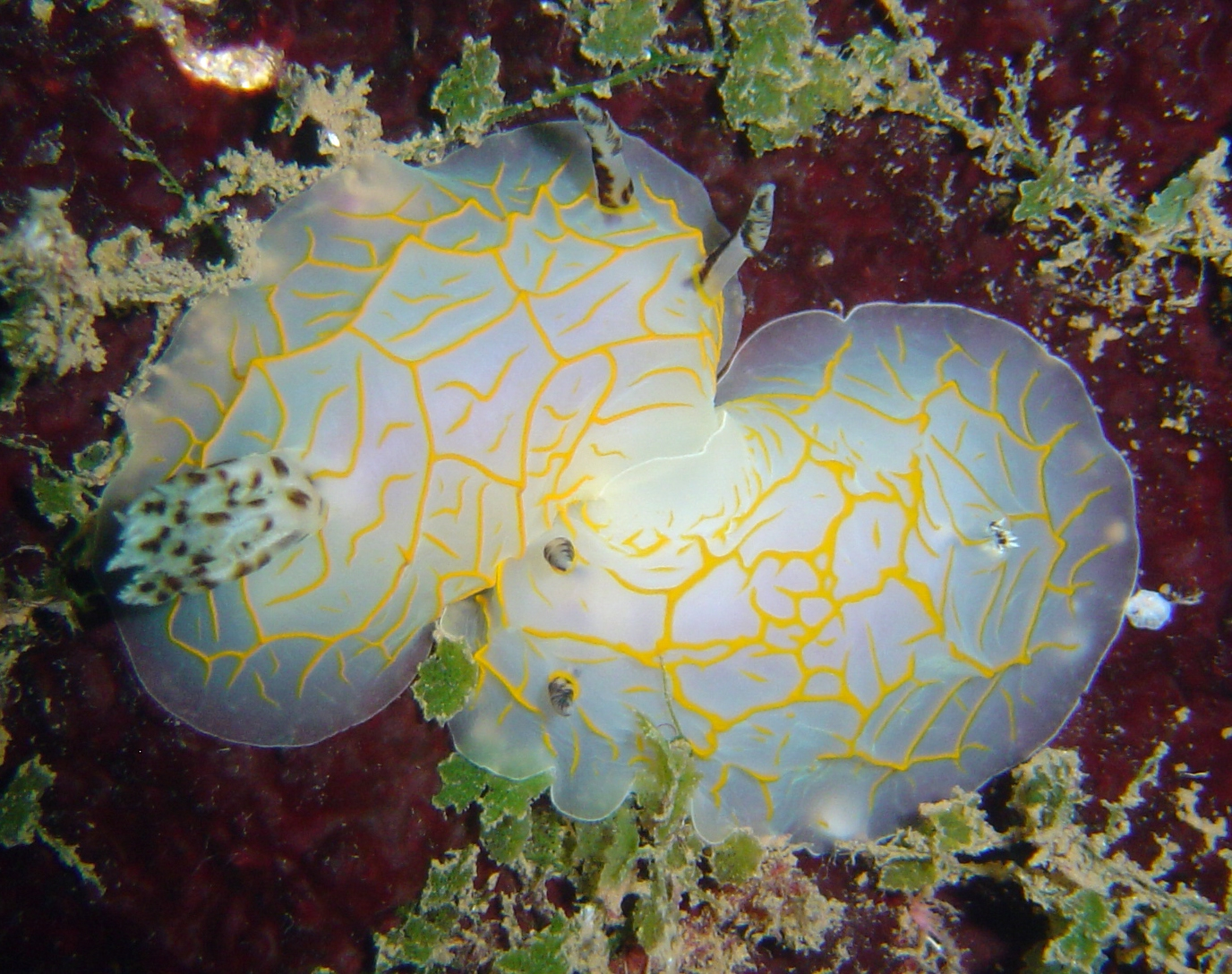
A mating pair of Halgerda guahan
