= Halgerda leopardalis =

Scientific classification
- Kingdom: Animalia
- Phylum: Mollusca
- Class: Gastropoda
- Order: Nudibranchia
- Family: Discodorididae
- Genus: Halgerda
- Species: H. leopardalis

Binomial name
- Halgerda leopardalis Tibiriçá, Pola & Cervera, 2018

Species of sea slug

Halgerda leopardalis is a species of sea slug, a dorid nudibranch, a shell-less marine gastropod mollusk in the family Discodorididae.

== Distribution ==
This species was described from a specimen collected at Zavora, Mozambique, 24.515556°S 35.210556°E at depth of 16 m (52 ft).
