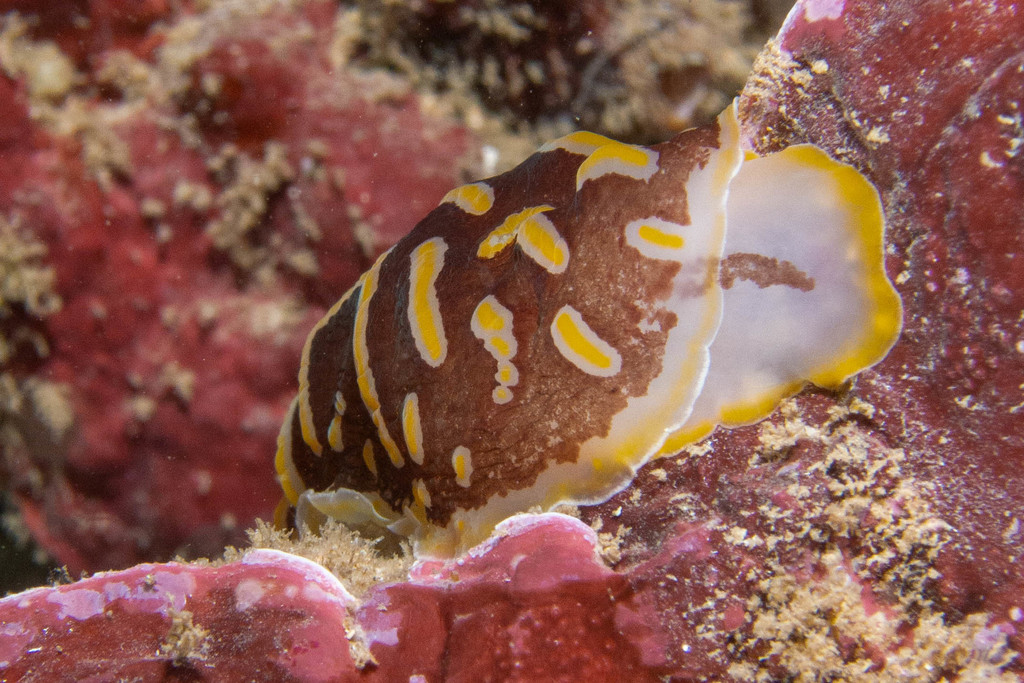

Scientific classification
- Kingdom: Animalia
- Phylum: Mollusca
- Class: Gastropoda
- Order: Nudibranchia
- Family: Discodorididae
- Genus: Halgerda
- Species: H. theobroma

Binomial name
- Halgerda theobroma Fahey & Gosliner, 2001

= Halgerda theobroma =

Species of gastropod

Halgerda theobroma is a species of sea slug, a dorid nudibranch, shell-less marine gastropod mollusks in the family Discodorididae.

== Distribution ==
This species was described from Rottnest Island, Western Australia.
