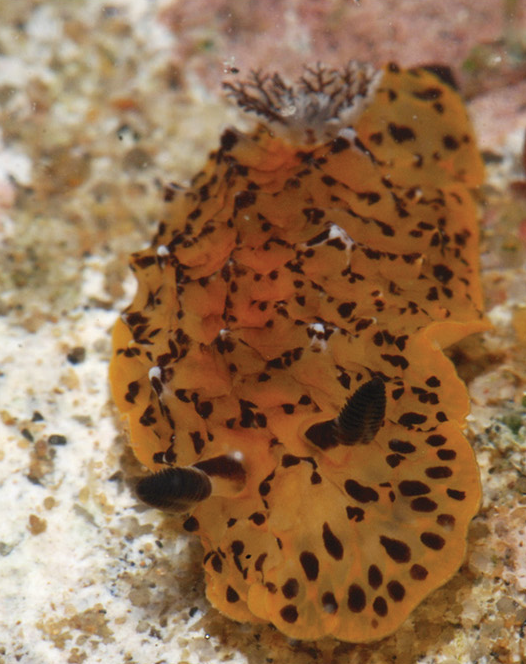

Scientific classification
- Kingdom: Animalia
- Phylum: Mollusca
- Class: Gastropoda
- Order: Nudibranchia
- Family: Discodorididae
- Genus: Halgerda
- Species: H. dalanghita

Binomial name
- Halgerda dalanghita Fahey & Gosliner, 1999

= Halgerda dalanghita =

Species of gastropod

Halgerda dalanghita is a species of sea slug, a dorid nudibranch, shell-less marine gastropod mollusks in the family Discodorididae.

== Distribution ==
The holotype of Halgerda dalanghita was collected at Maricaban Island, Luzon, Philippines. Additional specimens from the same locality, Papua New Guinea, and Natal, South Africa were included in the original description. Subsequent records extend the distribution to Japan and the Solomon Islands.
