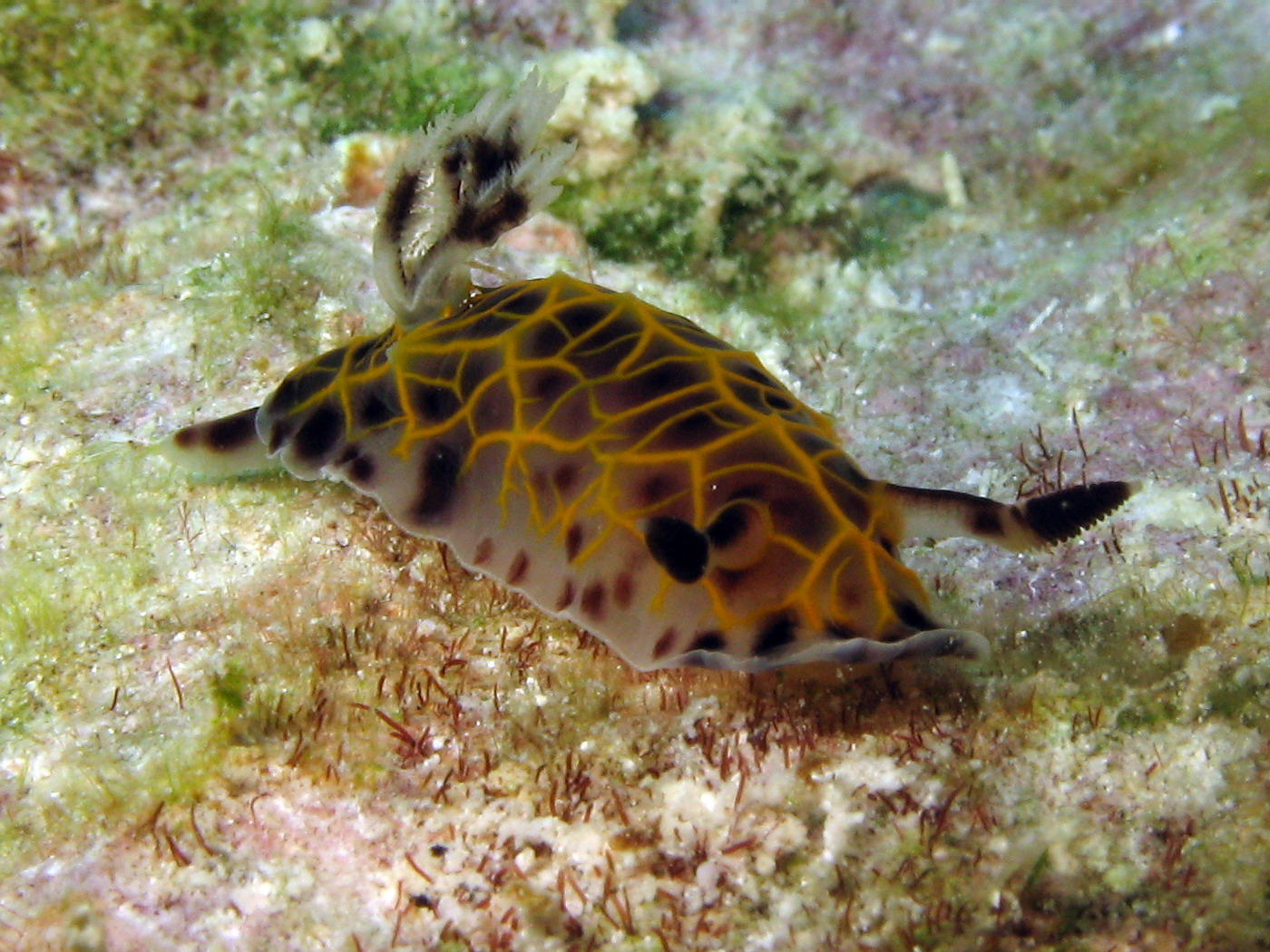

Scientific classification
- Kingdom: Animalia
- Phylum: Mollusca
- Class: Gastropoda
- Order: Nudibranchia
- Family: Discodorididae
- Genus: Halgerda
- Species: H. wasinensis

Binomial name
- Halgerda wasinensis Eliot, 1904

= Halgerda wasinensis =

Species of gastropod

Halgerda wasinensis is a species of sea slug, a dorid nudibranch, shell-less marine gastropod mollusks in the family Discodorididae.

== Distribution ==
This species was described from specimens collected by Cyril Crossland at Wasini Island, East Africa. It occurs in the Indian Ocean from Kenya and Tanzania south to Sodwana Bay, South Africa.
