= Halgerda fibra =

Scientific classification
- Kingdom: Animalia
- Phylum: Mollusca
- Class: Gastropoda
- Order: Nudibranchia
- Family: Discodorididae
- Genus: Halgerda
- Species: H. fibra

Binomial name
- Halgerda fibra Fahey & Gosliner, 2000

Species of gastropod

Halgerda fibra is a species of sea slug, a dorid nudibranch, shell-less marine gastropod mollusks in the family Discodorididae.

== Distribution ==
This species was described from 3 specimens collected in the Philippines at depths of 92–95 m (302–312 ft). Additional specimens included in the original description are from New Caledonia at depths of 234–402 m (768–1,319 ft).
