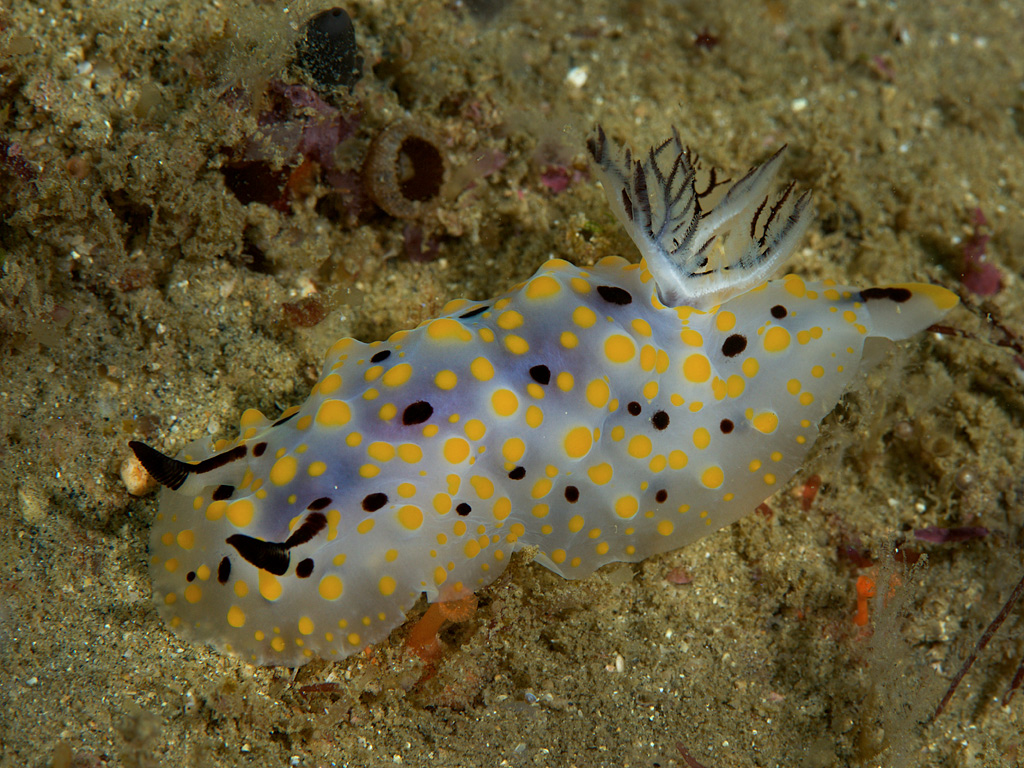
- The nudibranch Halgerda punctata, Unawatuna, Sri Lanka.

Scientific classification
- Kingdom: Animalia
- Phylum: Mollusca
- Class: Gastropoda
- Order: Nudibranchia
- Family: Discodorididae
- Genus: Halgerda
- Species: H. punctata

Binomial name
- Halgerda punctata Farran, 1902

= Halgerda punctata =

Species of gastropod

Halgerda punctata is a species of sea slug, a dorid nudibranch, shell-less marine gastropod mollusks in the family Discodorididae.

== Distribution ==
This species was described from Sri Lanka. It is also reported from elsewhere in the eastern Indian Ocean on the coasts of Thailand and Myanmar. It was erroneously reported from the African coast.

== Description ==
The body of Halgerda punctata is translucent white with a pattern of dark brown or black spots. There is a reticulate pattern of raised ridges which carry yellow-tipped tubercles. In specimens from Thailand and Myanmar these ridges are pronounced, but in animals from Sri Lanka they are much less noticeable. The gills and rhinophores are translucent with dark brown markings.
