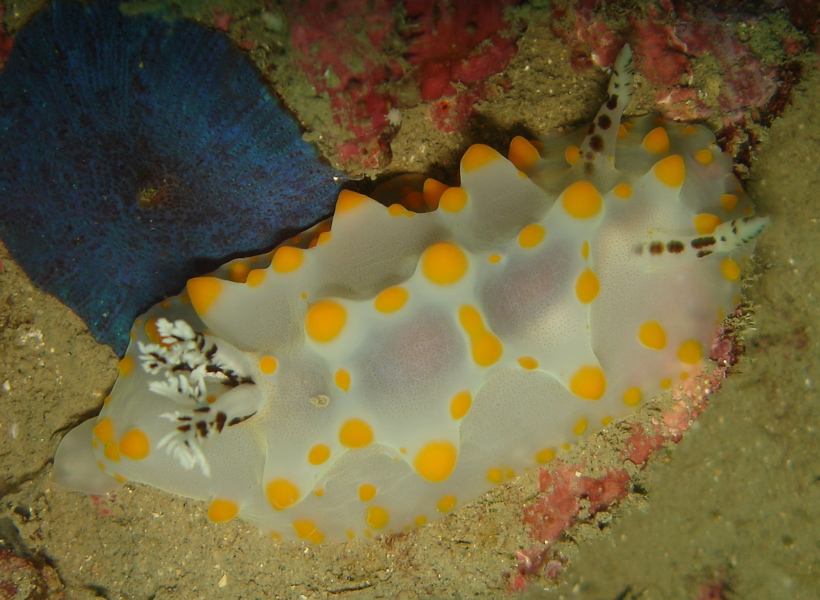

Scientific classification
- Kingdom: Animalia
- Phylum: Mollusca
- Class: Gastropoda
- Order: Nudibranchia
- Family: Discodorididae
- Genus: Halgerda
- Species: H. carlsoni

Binomial name
- Halgerda carlsoni Rudman, 1978

= Halgerda carlsoni =

Species of gastropod

Halgerda carlsoni is a species of sea slug, a dorid nudibranch, shell-less marine gastropod mollusks in the family Discodorididae.

== Description ==
This animal is one of a group of mainly white species of Halgerda with orange markings. This species can be more than 50 mm (2.0 in) in length. Its body is massive, stocky and the mantle overhangs the narrow foot. The body is covered with tubercles of various sizes whose top is orange to red with a white rim at the base. The background body colour is translucent white with dense punctuation of very small red-orange dots. The mantle edge is trimmed with small tubercles tipped with orange to red dots. Rhinophores and gills are retractable, translucent and speckled with dark spots. Animals from East Africa differ in having lines or more continuous brown pigment on the rhinophores and gills instead of spots and are considered to be a distinct species by some authorities.

== Distribution ==
This species was described from Suva Harbour, Fiji. It has subsequently been reported from New Caledonia, Tonga, Sulawesi, the Philippines, Malaysia, Tanzania, Madagascar and South Africa.
