= Halgerda johnsonorum =

Scientific classification
- Kingdom: Animalia
- Phylum: Mollusca
- Class: Gastropoda
- Order: Nudibranchia
- Family: Discodorididae
- Genus: Halgerda
- Species: H. johnsonorum

Binomial name
- Halgerda johnsonorum Carlson & Hoff, 2000

Species of gastropod

Halgerda johnsonorum is a species of sea slug, a dorid nudibranch, a shell-less marine gastropod mollusk in the family Discodorididae.

== Distribution ==
This species is found in the tropical western Pacific, at the Marshall Islands.
