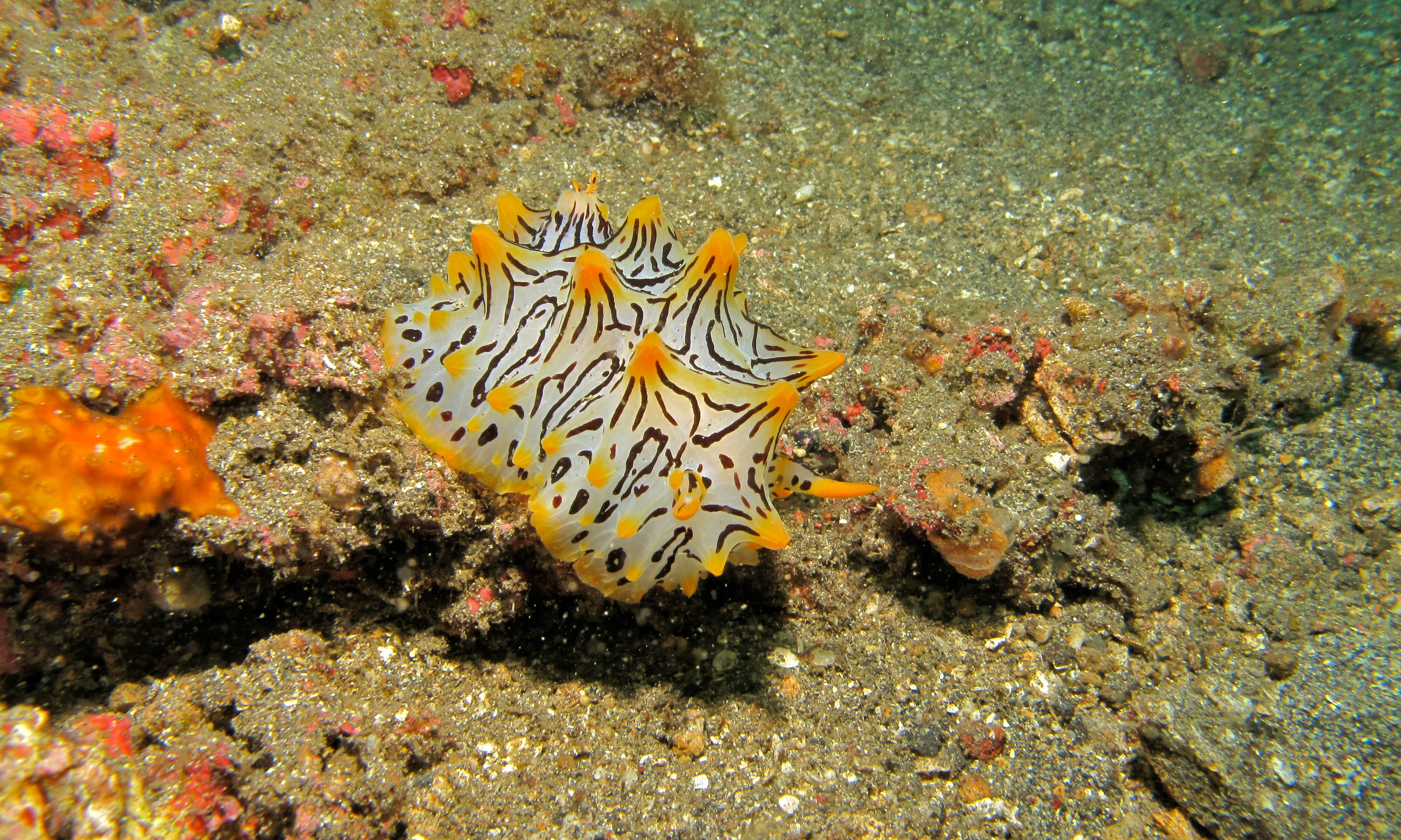

Scientific classification
- Kingdom: Animalia
- Phylum: Mollusca
- Class: Gastropoda
- Order: Nudibranchia
- Family: Discodorididae
- Genus: Halgerda
- Species: H. okinawa

Binomial name
- Halgerda okinawa Carlson & Hoff, 2000

= Halgerda okinawa =

Species of gastropod

Halgerda okinawa is a species of sea slug, a dorid nudibranch, shell-less marine gastropod mollusks in the family Discodorididae.

== Distribution ==
This species was described from Seragaki, Okinawa. It is also reported from Sulawesi and Alor Island, Indonesia, East Timor and the Philippines.
