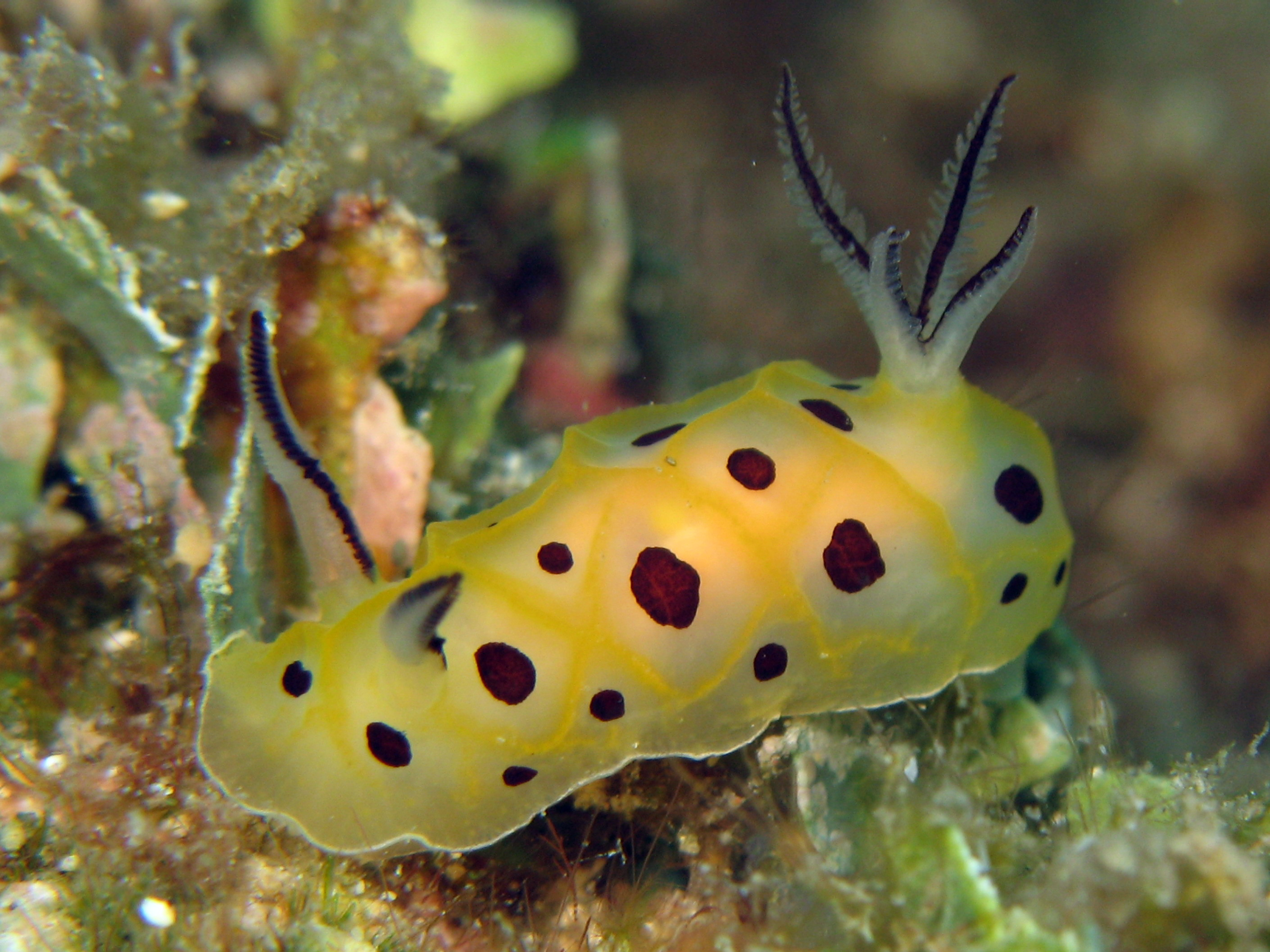

Scientific classification
- Kingdom: Animalia
- Phylum: Mollusca
- Class: Gastropoda
- Order: Nudibranchia
- Family: Discodorididae
- Genus: Halgerda
- Species: H. brunneomaculata

Binomial name
- Halgerda brunneomaculata Carlson & Hoff, 1993

= Halgerda brunneomaculata =

Species of gastropod

Halgerda brunneomaculata is a species of sea slug, a dorid nudibranch, shell-less marine gastropod mollusks in the family Discodorididae.

== Distribution ==
This species was described from Guam, Mariana Islands. It has subsequently been reported from Rarotonga in the Cook Islands and the Coral Sea.
