= Halgerda albocristata =

Scientific classification
- Kingdom: Animalia
- Phylum: Mollusca
- Class: Gastropoda
- Order: Nudibranchia
- Family: Discodorididae
- Genus: Halgerda
- Species: H. albocristata

Binomial name
- Halgerda albocristata Gosliner & Fahey, 1998

Species of gastropod

Halgerda albocristata is a species of sea slug, a dorid nudibranch, a shell-less marine gastropod mollusk in the family Discodorididae.

== Distribution ==
The holotype of this species was collected at Bonito Island, Batangas, Philippines. Additional material in the original description includes specimens from Okinawa and Sulawesi, Indonesia. Subsequently reported from Heron Island, Great Barrier Reef, Queensland and the Marianas Islands.
