= Halgerda graphica =

Scientific classification
- Kingdom: Animalia
- Phylum: Mollusca
- Class: Gastropoda
- Order: Nudibranchia
- Family: Discodorididae
- Genus: Halgerda
- Species: H. graphica

Binomial name
- Halgerda graphica Basedow & Hedley, 1905

Species of gastropod

Halgerda graphica is a species of sea slug, a dorid nudibranch, shell-less marine gastropod mollusks in the family Discodorididae.

== Distribution ==
This species was described from Kangaroo Island, South Australia. It has also been reported from nearby Port Moorowie on the Yorke Peninsula and Burrewarra Point, near Batemans Bay, New South Wales.
