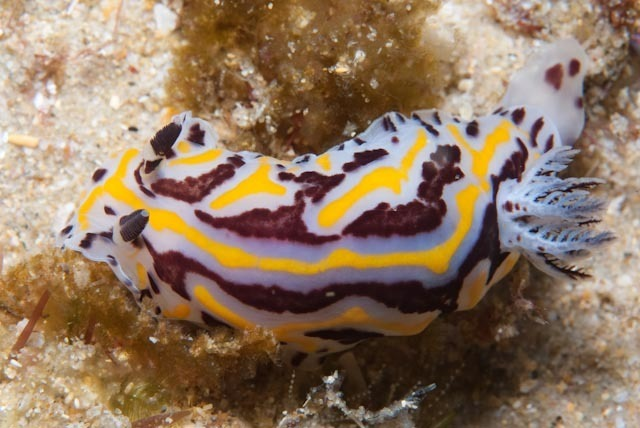

Scientific classification
- Kingdom: Animalia
- Phylum: Mollusca
- Class: Gastropoda
- Order: Nudibranchia
- Family: Discodorididae
- Genus: Halgerda
- Species: H. dichromis

Binomial name
- Halgerda dichromis Fahey & Gosliner, 1999

= Halgerda dichromis =

Species of gastropod

Halgerda dichromis is a species of sea slug, a dorid nudibranch, shell-less marine gastropod mollusks in the family Discodorididae.

== Distribution ==
This species was described from a single specimen collected in Durban Harbour, South Africa. It has subsequently been found on several occasions on the KwaZulu-Natal coast and at Brazen Head, Transkei.
