= Halgerda xishaensis =

Scientific classification
- Kingdom: Animalia
- Phylum: Mollusca
- Class: Gastropoda
- Order: Nudibranchia
- Family: Discodorididae
- Genus: Halgerda
- Species: H. xishaensis

Binomial name
- Halgerda xishaensis Lin, 1975

Species of gastropod

Halgerda xishaensis is a species of sea slug, a dorid nudibranch, shell-less marine gastropod mollusks in the family Discodorididae.

== Distribution ==
This species was described from the intertidal zone of the Xisha Islands, China.
