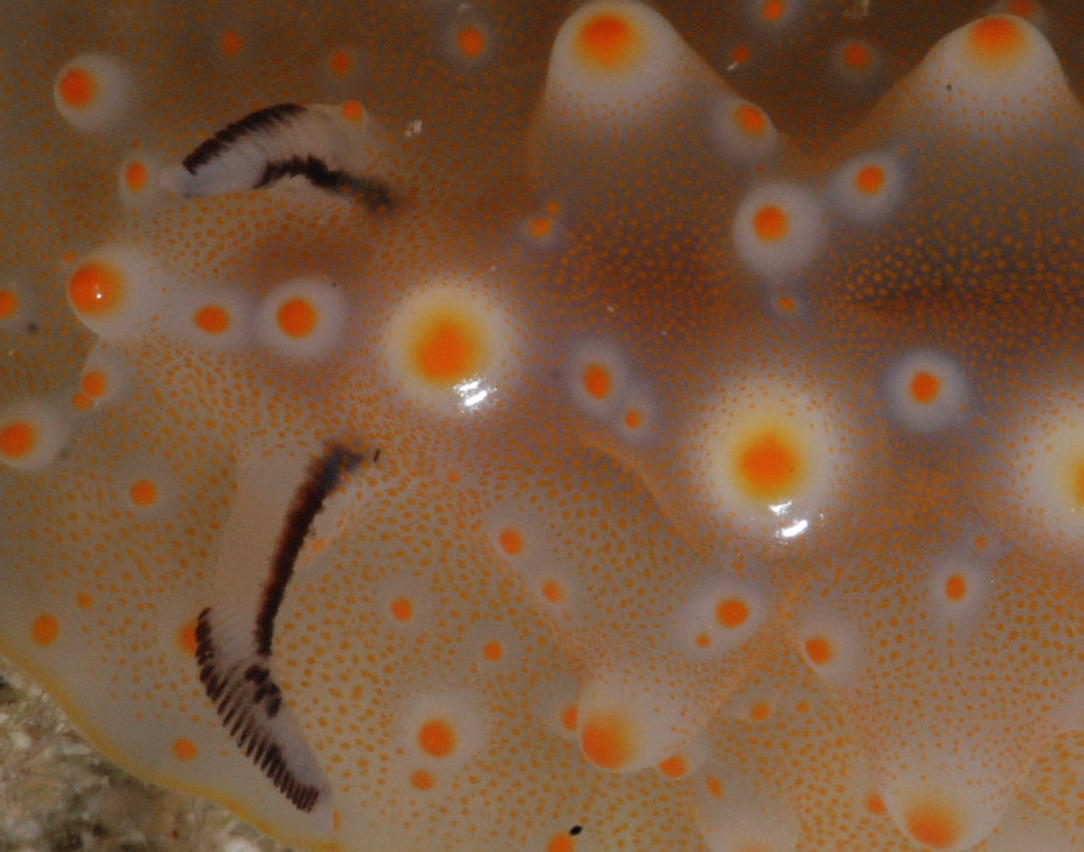
- H nuarrensis colour details

Scientific classification
- Kingdom: Animalia
- Phylum: Mollusca
- Class: Gastropoda
- Order: Nudibranchia
- Family: Discodorididae
- Genus: Halgerda
- Species: H. nuarrensis

Binomial name
- Halgerda nuarrensis Tibiriçá, Pola & Cervera, 2018

= Halgerda nuarrensis =

Species of gastropod

Halgerda nuarrensis is a species of sea slug, a dorid nudibranch, a shell-less marine gastropod mollusk in the family Discodorididae.

== Distribution ==
This species was described from a specimen collected at Memba Bay, Nuarro, Mozambique, 14.185556°S 40.698889°E at depth of 26 m (85 ft) and a single other specimen collected nearby.

== Etymology ==
This species was named in honor of Nuarro EcoLodge in recognition of their research support for the first author (Yara Tibiriçá) and conservation efforts. Nuarro is also the local name for the blow hole near the bay where the type specimen was collected
