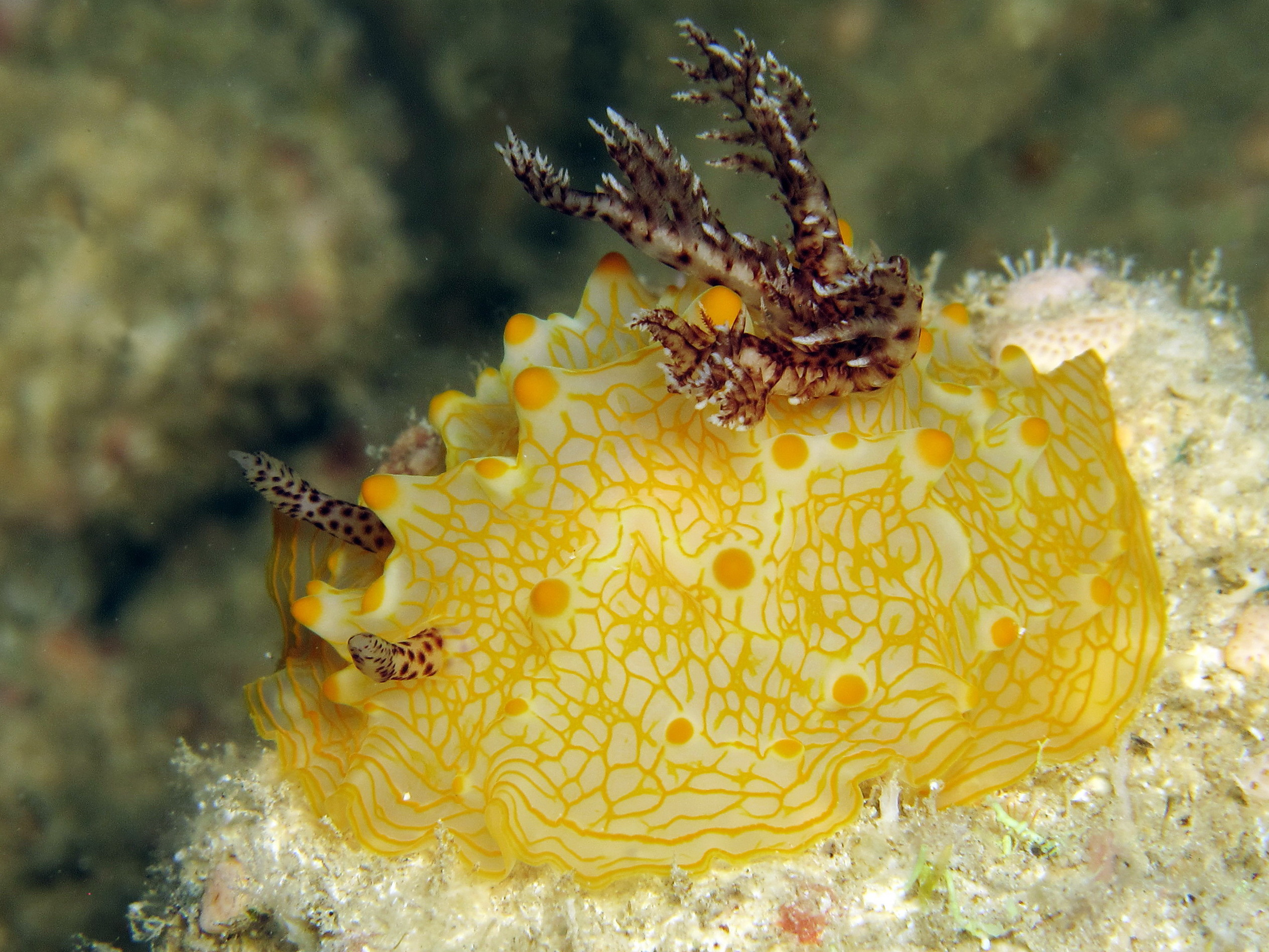

Scientific classification
- Kingdom: Animalia
- Phylum: Mollusca
- Class: Gastropoda
- Order: Nudibranchia
- Family: Discodorididae
- Genus: Halgerda
- Species: H. malesso

Binomial name
- Halgerda malesso Carlson & Hoff, 1993

= Halgerda malesso =

Species of gastropod

Halgerda malesso is a species of sea slug, a dorid nudibranch, shell-less marine gastropod mollusc in the family Discodorididae.

== Distribution ==
This species was described from Guam, Mariana Islands. It has also been reported from the Marshall Islands.
