= Halgerda bacalusia =

Scientific classification
- Kingdom: Animalia
- Phylum: Mollusca
- Class: Gastropoda
- Order: Nudibranchia
- Family: Discodorididae
- Genus: Halgerda
- Species: H. bacalusia

Binomial name
- Halgerda bacalusia Fahey & Gosliner, 1999

Species of gastropod

Halgerda bacalusia is a species of sea slug, a dorid nudibranch, shell-less marine gastropod mollusks in the family Discodorididae.

== Distribution ==
This species was described from Richelieu Rock, Andaman Sea, Thailand.
