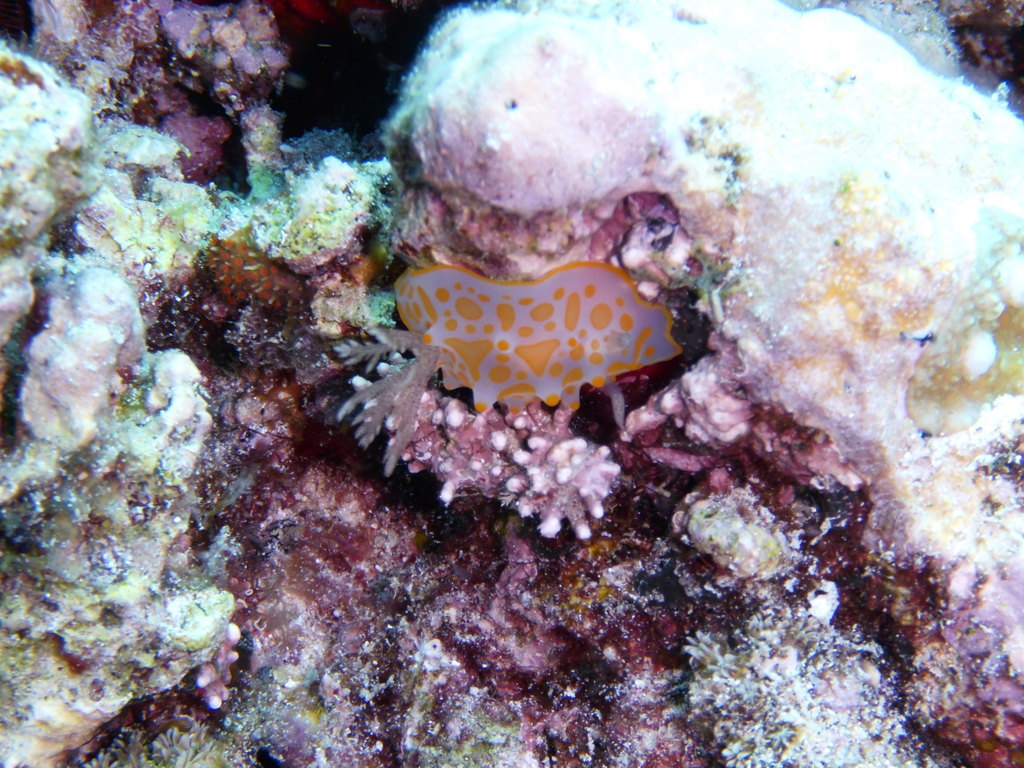

Scientific classification
- Kingdom: Animalia
- Phylum: Mollusca
- Class: Gastropoda
- Order: Nudibranchia
- Family: Discodorididae
- Genus: Halgerda
- Species: H. aurantiomaculata

Binomial name
- Halgerda aurantiomaculata (Allan, 1932)

= Halgerda aurantiomaculata =

Species of gastropod

Halgerda aurantiomaculata is a species of sea slug, a dorid nudibranch, shell-less marine gastropod mollusks in the family Discodorididae.

== Distribution ==
Described from North-West Islet, Capricorn Group, Queensland, Australia. Subsequently reported from eastern Papua New Guinea and Fiji.
