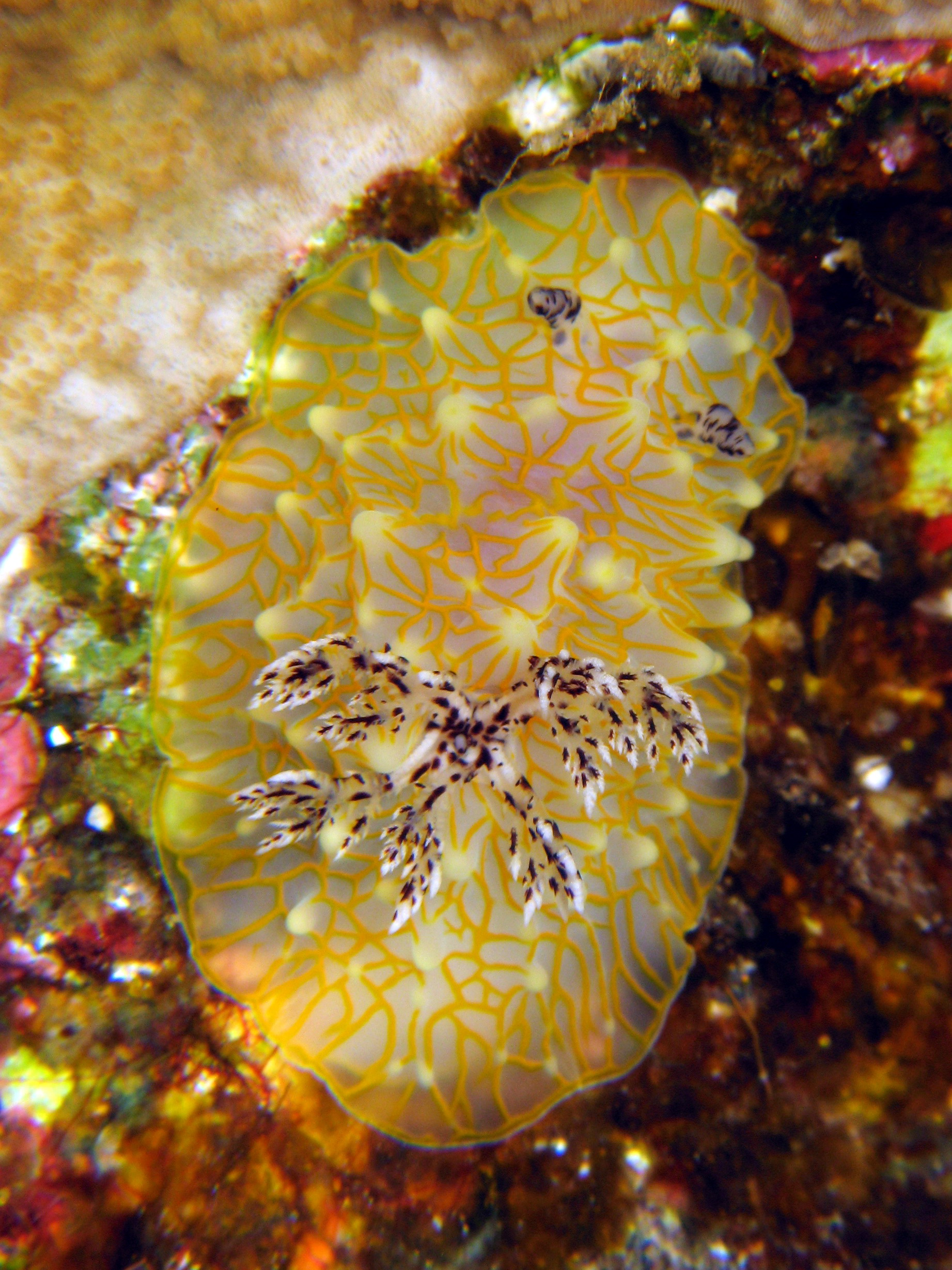
- Halgerda terramtuentis

Scientific classification
- Kingdom: Animalia
- Phylum: Mollusca
- Class: Gastropoda
- Order: Nudibranchia
- Family: Discodorididae
- Genus: Halgerda
- Species: H. terramtuentis

Binomial name
- Halgerda terramtuentis Bertsch & Johnson, 1982

= Gold lace nudibranch =

Species of gastropod

The gold lace nudibranch (Halgerda terramtuentis) is a species of sea slug, a dorid nudibranch, shell-less marine gastropod mollusks in the family Discodorididae.

== Description ==
Founded by Bertsch and Johnson in 1982, the Halgerda terramtuentis has an opaque white slug-like physique. The body’s morphology includes a flat jelly-like texture, and solid yellowish-gold lines running throughout the mantle; located also at the edge of the muscular foot. Their gills are of a whitish hue with black detailing similar to spots. Additionally, the prominent white pustules emerge where the lines consistently cross. The Nudibranch’s length ranges from 15 mm to 50 mm long.

The Halgerda terramtuenti are hermaphrodites that mate within combat of one another. The disadvantaged Nudibranchi’s mantle is then penetrated with reproductive material from the victor. Following the life cycle, they lay groups of eggs coated in yellowish mucus, that develop into veliger larvae and subsequently, full-grown adults capable of reproduction.

== Distribution ==
In Eastern Central Pacific, the Halgerda terramtuentis is endemic to five major Hawaiian islands: Hawaiʻi, Maui, Lanaʻi, Oʻahu, and Kauaʻi; including the remote islands of Niʻihau and the French Frigate Shoals. These sea slugs are found five to thirty meters underwater near overhanging rock foundations and underwater caves.
