= Halgerda onna =

Scientific classification
- Kingdom: Animalia
- Phylum: Mollusca
- Class: Gastropoda
- Order: Nudibranchia
- Family: Discodorididae
- Genus: Halgerda
- Species: H. onna

Binomial name
- Halgerda onna Fahey & Gosliner, 2001

Species of gastropod

Halgerda onna is a species of sea slug, a dorid nudibranch, shell-less marine gastropod mollusks in the family Discodorididae.

== Distribution ==
This species was described from Onna Village, Okinawa. It is also reported from Guam.
