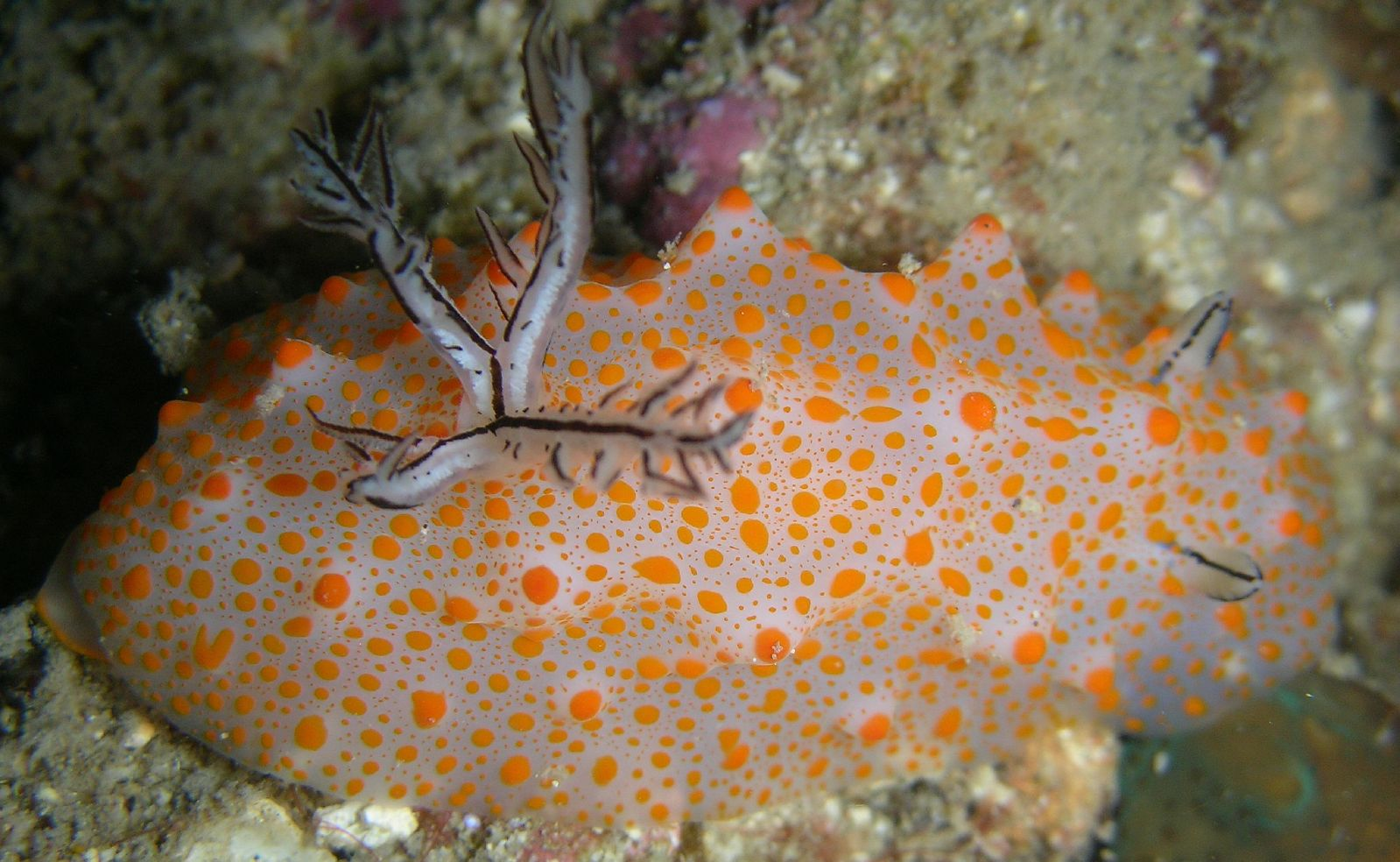

Scientific classification
- Kingdom: Animalia
- Phylum: Mollusca
- Class: Gastropoda
- Order: Nudibranchia
- Family: Discodorididae
- Genus: Halgerda
- Species: H. stricklandi

Binomial name
- Halgerda stricklandi Fahey & Gosliner, 1999

= Halgerda stricklandi =

Species of gastropod

Halgerda stricklandi is a species of sea slug, a dorid nudibranch, a shell-less marine gastropod mollusk in the family Discodorididae.

== Distribution ==
Originally described from Ko Ha, Andaman Sea, Thailand. This species has also been found in Indonesia, Malaysia, and Myanmar.

== Description ==
This animal can be distinguished by large, conical, bright orange-tipped tubercles scattered over the dorsum. Below each of the orange tips the tubercles is a band of solid white. Many smaller orange tubercles are scattered amongst the larger ones. The rhinophore club is translucent yellow. There is a single black line extending down the length of both the rhinophore club and stalk, on the posterior midline. There is black pigmentation on the anterior side of the club, while the gill has black spots on the anterior sides of the four branchial leaves. The margin of the foot is orange.
