= Halgerda jennyae =

Scientific classification
- Kingdom: Animalia
- Phylum: Mollusca
- Class: Gastropoda
- Order: Nudibranchia
- Family: Discodorididae
- Genus: Halgerda
- Species: H. jennyae

Binomial name
- Halgerda jennyae Tibiriçá, Pola & Cervera, 2018

Species of gastropod

Halgerda jennyae is a species of sea slug, a dorid nudibranch, a shell-less marine gastropod mollusk in the family Discodorididae.

== Distribution ==
This species was described from a specimen collected at Ponta do Ouro, Mozambique, 26.835833°S 32.890833°E at depth of 20 m (66 ft).
