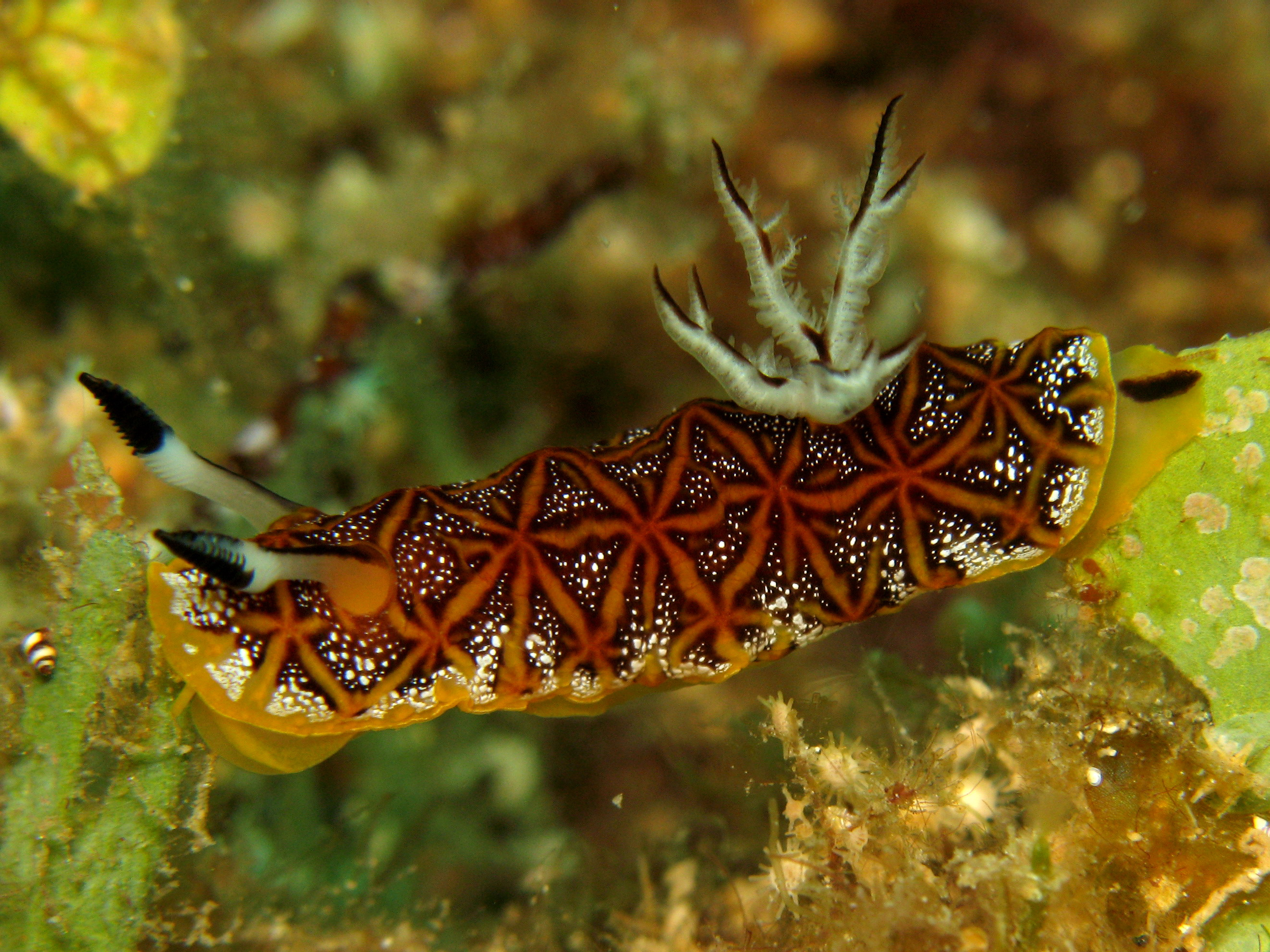
- Halgerda tessellata

Scientific classification
- Kingdom: Animalia
- Phylum: Mollusca
- Class: Gastropoda
- Order: Nudibranchia
- Family: Discodorididae
- Genus: Halgerda
- Species: H. tessellata

Binomial name
- Halgerda tessellata (Bergh, 1880)

Synonyms
- Dictyodoris tessellata Bergh, 1880

= Halgerda tessellata =

Species of gastropod

Halgerda tessellata is a species of sea slug, a dorid nudibranch, shell-less marine gastropod mollusks in the family Discodorididae.

== Distribution ==
This species was described from Palau. It occurs from the western shores of the Indian Ocean in Kenya, Tanzania and Madagascar to SE Australia and the Mariana Islands, Pacific Ocean.
