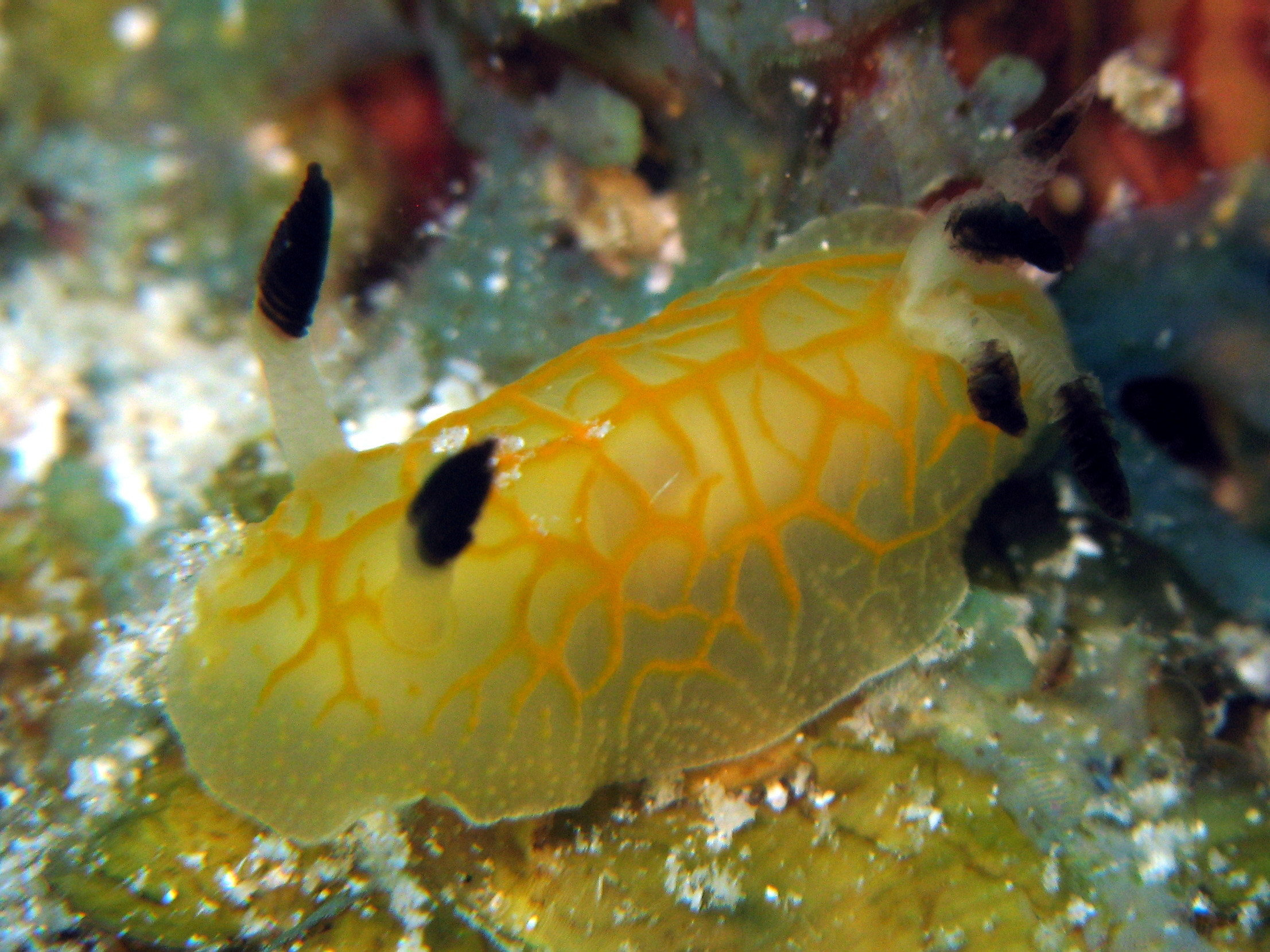

Scientific classification
- Kingdom: Animalia
- Phylum: Mollusca
- Class: Gastropoda
- Order: Nudibranchia
- Family: Discodorididae
- Genus: Halgerda
- Species: H. formosa

Binomial name
- Halgerda formosa Bergh, 1880

= Halgerda formosa =

Species of gastropod

Halgerda formosa is a species of sea slug, a dorid nudibranch, shell-less marine gastropod mollusks in the family Discodorididae.

== Distribution ==
This species was described from a specimen collected on the island of Réunion, Indian Ocean. It has subsequently been rediscovered there and on Mauritius.
