= List of Teucrium species =

The following is a list of Teucrium species accepted by Plants of the World Online at March 2021.

- Teucrium abolhayatensis Ranjbar & Mahmoudi
- Teucrium abutiloides L'Hér.
- Teucrium africanum Thunb.
- Teucrium afrum (Emb. & Maire) Pau & Font Quer
- Teucrium aladagense Vural & H.Duman
- Teucrium albicaule Toelken – scurfy germander (Australia)
- Teucrium albidum Munby
- Teucrium alborubrum Hemsl.
- Teucrium algarbiense (Cout.) Cout.
- Teucrium alopecurus de Noé
- Teucrium alpestre Sm.
- Teucrium alyssifolium Stapf
- Teucrium amplexicaule Benth.
- Teucrium andrusi Post
- Teucrium angustissimum Schreb.
- Teucrium anlungense C.Y.Wu & S.Chow
- Teucrium annandalei Mukerjee
- Teucrium antiatlanticum (Maire) Sauvage & Vindt
- Teucrium antilibanoticum Mouterde
- Teucrium antitauricum Ekim
- Teucrium apollinis Maire & Weiller
- Teucrium aragonense Loscos & J.Pardo
- Teucrium arduinoi L.
- Teucrium argutum R.Br. – native germander (Qld., N.S.W.)
- Teucrium aristatum Pérez Lara
- Teucrium aroanium Orph. ex Boiss.
- Teucrium asiaticum L.
- Teucrium atratum Pomel
- Teucrium aureiforme Pomel
- Teucrium aureocandidum Andr.
- Teucrium aureum Schreb.
- Teucrium balearicum (Coss. ex Pau) Castrov. & Bayon
- Teucrium balfourii Vierh.
- Teucrium balthazaris Sennen
- Teucrium baokangensis C.L.Xiang
- Teucrium barbarum Jahand. & Maire
- Teucrium barbeyanum Asch. & Taub. ex E.A.Durand & Barratte
- Teucrium betchei (F.Muell.) Kattari & Salmaki (Qld., N.S.W.)
- Teucrium betonicum L'Hér.
- Teucrium bicolor Sm.
- Teucrium bicoloreum Pau ex Vicioso
- Teucrium bidentatum Hemsl.
- Teucrium bogoutdinovae Melnikov
- Teucrium botrys L. - cutleaf germander
- Teucrium brachyandrum Puech
- Teucrium bracteatum Desf.
- Teucrium brevifolium Schreb.
- Teucrium bullatum Coss. & Balansa
- Teucrium burmanicum Mukerjee
- Teucrium buxifolium Schreb.
- Teucrium campanulatum L.
- Teucrium canadense L. – American germander, Canada germander, wood sage
- Teucrium canum Fisch. & C.A.Mey.
- Teucrium capitatum L.
- Teucrium carolipaui Vicioso ex Pau
- Teucrium carthaginense Lange
- Teucrium caucasigenum Melnikov
- Teucrium cavanillesianum Font Quer & Jeronimo
- Teucrium cavernarum P.H.Davis
- Teucrium chamaedrys L. – wall germander
- Teucrium chardonianum Maire & Wilczek
- Teucrium charidemi Sandwith
- Teucrium chasmophyticum Rech.f.
- Teucrium chlorocephalum Celak.
- Teucrium chlorostachyum Pau & Font Quer
- Teucrium chowii Y.H.Tong & N.H.Xia
- Teucrium chrysotrichum Lange
- Teucrium cincinnatum Maire
- Teucrium clementiae Ryding
- Teucrium coahuilanum B.L.Turner
- Teucrium compactum Clemente ex Lag.
- Teucrium coniortodes Boiss. & Blanche
- Teucrium corymbiferum Desf.
- Teucrium corymbosum R.Br. – forest germander (Australia, New Guinea)
- Teucrium cossonii D.Wood – fruity germander
- Teucrium creticum L.
- Teucrium cubense Jacq. – small coastal germander, dwarf germander
- Teucrium cuneifolium Sm.
- Teucrium cyprium Boiss.
- Teucrium cyrenaicum (Maire & Weiller) Brullo & Furnari
- Teucrium daucoides A.R.Bean
- Teucrium davaeanum Coss.
- Teucrium dealianum Emb. & Maire
- Teucrium decaisnei C.Presl
- Teucrium decipiens Coss. & Balansa
- Teucrium demnatense Coss. ex Batt.
- Teucrium disjunctum K.R.Thiele & K.A.Sheph.
- Teucrium divaricatum Sieber ex Heldr.
- Teucrium doumerguei Sennen
- Teucrium ducellieri Batt.
- Teucrium dumulosum (Rech.f.) Brullo & Guarino
- Teucrium dunense Sennen
- Teucrium eburneum Thulin
- Teucrium edetanum M.B.Crespo, Mateo & T.Navarro
- Teucrium embergeri (Sauvage & Vindt) El Oualidi, T.Navarro & A.Martin
- Teucrium eremaeum Diels (W.A.)
- Teucrium eriocephalum Willk.
- Teucrium eximium O.Schwartz
- Teucrium expassum Pau
- Teucrium fallax A.R.Bean
- Teucrium faurei Maire
- Teucrium fililobum F.Muell. ex Benth.
- Teucrium flavum L.
- Teucrium fragile Boiss.
- Teucrium franchetianum Rouy & Coincy
- Teucrium francisci-werneri Rech.f.
- Teucrium francoi M.Seq., Capelo, J.C.Costa & R.Jardim
- Teucrium freynii E.Rev. ex Willk.
- Teucrium fruticans L. – tree germander, shrubby germander
- Teucrium gabrieliae Bornm.
- Teucrium gattefossei Emb.
- Teucrium glandulosum Kellogg – sticky germander, desert germander
- Teucrium gnaphalodes L'Hér.
- Teucrium goetzei Gürke
- Teucrium gracile Barbey & Fors.-Major
- Teucrium grandifolium R.A.Clement
- Teucrium grandiusculum F.Muell. & Tate (W.A., S.A., N.T.)
- Teucrium grosii Pau
- Teucrium gypsophilum Emb. & Maire
- Teucrium haenseleri Boiss.
- Teucrium halacsyanum Heldr.
- Teucrium haradjanii Briq. ex Rech.f.
- Teucrium helichrysoides (Diels) Greuter & Burdet
- Teucrium heterophyllum L'Hér.
- Teucrium heterotrichum Briq. ex Rech.f.
- Teucrium heynei V.S.Kumar & Chakrab.
- Teucrium hieronymi Sennen
- Teucrium hifacense Pau
- Teucrium hijazicum Hedge & R.A.King
- Teucrium hircanicum L.
- Teucrium homotrichum (Font Quer) Rivas Mart.
- Teucrium huotii Emb. & Maire
- Teucrium integrifolium Benth. – teucry weed (W.A., N.T., Qld.)
- Teucrium intricatum Lange
- Teucrium irroratum A.R.Bean
- Teucrium japonicum Houtt.
- Teucrium joannis (Sauvage & Vindt) El Oualidi, T.Navarro & A.Martin
- Teucrium jolyi Mathez & Sauvage
- Teucrium jordanicum (Danin) Faried
- Teucrium junceum (A.Cunn. ex Walp.) Kattari & Heubl (Qld., N.S.W.)
- Teucrium kabylicum Batt.
- Teucrium karpasiticum Hadjik. & Hand
- Teucrium kotschyanum Poech
- Teucrium kraussii Codd
- Teucrium krymense Juz.
- Teucrium kyreniae (P.H.Davis) Hadjik. & Hand
- Teucrium labiosum C.Y.Wu & S.Chow
- Teucrium laciniatum Torr.
- Teucrium lamiifolium d'Urv.
- Teucrium lanigerum Lag.
- Teucrium laxum D.Don
- Teucrium leonis Sennen
- Teucrium lepicephalum Pau
- Teucrium leucocladum Boiss.
- Teucrium leucophyllum Montbret & Aucher ex Benth.
- Teucrium libanitis Schreb.
- Teucrium lini-vaccarii Pamp.
- Teucrium lucidum L.
- Teucrium lusitanicum Schreb.
- Teucrium luteum (Mill.) Degen
- Teucrium macrophyllum (C.Y.Wu & S.Chow) J.H.Zheng
- Teucrium macrum Boiss. & Hausskn.
- Teucrium maghrebinum Greuter & Burdet
- Teucrium malenconianum Maire
- Teucrium manghuaense Y.Z.Sun ex S.Chow
- Teucrium marum L.
- Teucrium mascatense Boiss.
- Teucrium massiliense L.
- Teucrium maximowiczii Prob.
- Teucrium melissoides Boiss. & Hausskn.
- Teucrium mesanidum (Litard. & Maire) Sauvage & Vindt
- Teucrium micranthum B.J.Conn (Qld.)
- Teucrium microphyllum Desf.
- Teucrium micropodioides Rouy
- Teucrium mideltense (Batt.) Humbert
- Teucrium miragestorum Gómez Nav., Roselló, P.P.Ferrer & Peris
- Teucrium mitecum Tattou & El Oualidi
- Teucrium modestum A.R.Bean
- Teucrium moleromesae Sánchez-Gómez, T.Navarro, J.F.Jiménez, J.B.Vera, Mota & del Río
- Teucrium montanum L.
- Teucrium montbretii Benth.
- Teucrium muletii Roselló, P.P.Ferrer, E.Laguna, Gómez Nav., A.Guillén & Peris
- Teucrium multicaule Montbret & Aucher ex Benth.
- Teucrium murcicum Sennen
- Teucrium musimonum Humbert ex Maire
- Teucrium myriocladum Diels (W.A.)
- Teucrium nanum C.Y.Wu & S.Chow
- Teucrium novorossicum Melnikov
- Teucrium nudicaule Hook.
- Teucrium nummulariifolium Baker
- Teucrium odontites Boiss. & Balansa
- Teucrium oliverianum Ging. ex Benth.
- Teucrium omeiense Y.Z.Sun
- Teucrium orientale L.
- Teucrium ornatum Hemsl.
- Teucrium oxylepis Font Quer
- Teucrium ozturkii A.P.Khokhr.
- Teucrium paederotoides Boiss.
- Teucrium pampaninii C.Du
- Teucrium parviflorum Schreb.
- Teucrium parvifolium (Hook.f.) Kattari & Salmaki
- Teucrium pernyi Franch.
- Teucrium persicum Boiss.
- Teucrium pestalozzae Boiss.
- Teucrium petelotii Doan ex Suddee & A.J.Paton
- Teucrium pilbaranum B.J.Conn (W.A.)
- Teucrium plectranthoides Gamble
- Teucrium polioides Ryding
- Teucrium polium L.
- Teucrium popovii R.A.King
- Teucrium procerum Boiss. & Blanche
- Teucrium proctorii L.O.Williams
- Teucrium pruinosum Boiss.
- Teucrium pseudaroanium Parolly, Erdag & Nordt
- Teucrium pseudochamaepitys L.
- Teucrium pseudoscorodonia Desf.
- Teucrium puberulum (F.Muell.) Kattari & Bräuchler (Qld., N.S.W.)
- Teucrium pugionifolium Pau
- Teucrium pumilum L.
- Teucrium pyrenaicum L.
- Teucrium quadrifarium Buch.-Ham. ex D.Don
- Teucrium racemosum R.Br. – forest germander (continental Australia)
- Teucrium radicans Bonnet & Barratte
- Teucrium ramaswamii M.B.Viswan. & Manik.
- Teucrium ramosissimum Desf.
- Teucrium reidii Toelken & D.Dean Cunn. (South Australia)
- Teucrium resupinatum Desf.
- Teucrium rhodocalyx O.Schwartz
- Teucrium rifanum (Maire & Sennen) Maire & Sennen
- Teucrium rigidum Benth.
- Teucrium rivas-martinezii Alcaraz, Garre, Mart.Parras & Peinado
- Teucrium rixanense Ruíz Torre & Ruíz Cast.
- Teucrium ronnigeri Sennen
- Teucrium rotundifolium Schreb.
- Teucrium rouyanum Coste & Soulié
- Teucrium royleanum Wall. ex Benth.
- Teucrium rupestre Coss. & Balansa
- Teucrium sagittatum A.R.Bean
- Teucrium salaminium Hadjik. & Hand
- Teucrium salviastrum Schreb.
- Teucrium sandrasicum O.Schwarz
- Teucrium sanguisorbifolium (Pau & Font Quer) Dobignard
- Teucrium santae Quézel & Simonn. ex Greuter & Burdet
- Teucrium sauvagei Le Houér.
- Teucrium scabrum Suddee & A.J.Paton
- Teucrium schoenenbergeri Nabli
- Teucrium scordium L.
- Teucrium scorodonia L. – woodland germander
- Teucrium serpylloides Maire & Weiller
- Teucrium sessiliflorum Benth. (W.A., S.A., N.S.W., Vic.)
- Teucrium shanicum Mukerjee
- Teucrium siculum (Raf.) Guss.
- Teucrium similatum T.Navarro & Rosua
- Teucrium simplex Vaniot
- Teucrium sirnakense Özcan & Dirmenci
- Teucrium socinianum Boiss.
- Teucrium socotranum Vierh.
- Teucrium somalense Ryding
- Teucrium spinosum L.
- Teucrium stachyophyllum P.H.Davis
- Teucrium stocksianum Boiss.
- Teucrium subspinosum Pourr. ex Willd.
- Teucrium taiwanianum T.H.Hsieh & T.C.Huang
- Teucrium tananicum Maire
- Teucrium teinense Kudô
- Teucrium terciae (Sánchez-Gómez, M.A.Carrión & A.Hern.) Sánchez-Gómez, M.A.Carrión & A.Hern.
- Teucrium teresanum Blanca, Cueto & J.Fuentes
- Teucrium teucriiflorum (F.Muell.) Kattari & Salmaki (W.A., N.T., S.A., Qld.)
- Teucrium thieleanum B.J.Conn (Victoria, Australia)
- Teucrium thymifolium Schreb.
- Teucrium thymoides Pomel
- Teucrium townsendii Vasey & Rose
- Teucrium trifidum Retz.
- Teucrium tsinlingense C.Y.Wu & S.Chow
- Teucrium turredanum Losa & Rivas Goday
- Teucrium ussuriense Kom.
- Teucrium veronicoides Maxim.
- Teucrium vesicarium Mill.
- Teucrium vincentinum Rouy
- Teucrium viscidum Blume
- Teucrium wattii Prain
- Teucrium webbianum Boiss.
- Teucrium werneri Emb.
- Teucrium wightii Hook.f.
- Teucrium yemense Deflers
- Teucrium zaianum Emb. & Maire
- Teucrium zanonii Pamp.
- Teucrium × alexeenkoanum Juz.
- Teucrium × alrumanae M.B.Crespo & J.C.Cristóbal
- Teucrium × alvarezii Alcaraz, Sánchez-Gómez, De la Torre & S.Ríos
- Teucrium × arenicola M.B.Crespo & Camuñas
- Teucrium × badiae Sennen
- Teucrium × bergadense Sennen
- Teucrium × bubanii Sennen
- Teucrium × carmelitanum Roselló, P.P.Ferrer, A.Guillén, Gómez Nav., Peris & E.Laguna
- Teucrium × carvalhoae A.F.Carrillo, A.Hern., Coy, Güemes & Sánchez-Gómez
- Teucrium × coeleste Schreb.
- Teucrium × conquense M.B.Crespo & Mateo
- Teucrium × contejeanii Giraudias
- Teucrium × delatorrei M.B.Crespo & M.Á.Alonso
- Teucrium × djebalicum Font Quer
- Teucrium × eloualidii Sánchez-Gómez & T.Navarro
- Teucrium × estevei Alcaraz, Sánchez-Gómez & J.S.Carrión
- Teucrium × gnaphaureum M.B.Crespo & Mateo
- Teucrium × guarae-requenae P.P.Ferrer, E.Laguna, Gómez Nav., Roselló & Peris
- Teucrium × guemesii J.F.Jiménez, A.F.Carrillo, M.A.Carrión
- Teucrium × lucentinum M.B.Crespo, M.Á.Alonso, Camuñas & J.C.Cristóbal
- Teucrium × maestracense M.B.Crespo & Mateo
- Teucrium × mailhoi Giraudias
- Teucrium × mateoi Solanas, M.B.Crespo & De la Torre
- Teucrium × motae Lahora & Sánchez-Gómez
- Teucrium × mugronense P.P.Ferrer, Roselló, Gómez Nav. & Guara
- Teucrium × navarroi Sánchez-Gómez, Güemes, A.F.Carrillo, Coy & A.Hern.
- Teucrium × pierae Gómez Nav., P.P.Ferrer, R.Roselló, A.Guillén, E.Laguna & Per
- Teucrium × portusmagni Sánchez-Gómez, A.F.Carrillo, A.Hern. & T.Navarro
- Teucrium × pseudoaragonense M.B.Crespo & Mateo
- Teucrium × pseudothymifolium Sánchez-Gómez, Güemes & A.F.Carrillo
- Teucrium × pujolii Sennen
- Teucrium × rigualii De la Torre & Alcaraz
- Teucrium × riosii De la Torre & Alcaraz
- Teucrium × riverae De la Torre & Alcaraz
- Teucrium × robledoi De la Torre & Alcaraz
- Teucrium × rubrovirens Pau
- Teucrium × sagarrae Font Quer
- Teucrium × scorolepis Pajarón & A.Molina
- Teucrium × turianum M.B.Crespo, P.P.Ferrer, Roselló, M.A.Alonso, Juan & E.Laguna
- Teucrium × vallbonense M.B.Crespo, M.Á.Alonso, Camuñas & J.C.Cristóbal
