= Forest germander =

Forest germander is a common name for several plants and may refer to:

- Teucrium corymbosum, native to Australia and New Guinea
- Teucrium racemosum, endemic to Australia
