= Marum (disambiguation) =

Marum may refer to:

== People ==
- Edward Marum (1822-1890), an Irish politician
- Ludwig Marum (1885–1934), a German politician
- Martin van Marum (1750-1837), a Dutch scientist
- John Dillon (comedian), born John Daily Marum (1831-1913), a US comedian

== Other ==
- Marum, a town in the Netherlands
- Marum (volcano), a volcano in Vanuatu
- Marum, a name for the herbs Teucrium marum and Thymus mastichina
- Marum, one of the Thai names for trees of the Moringa genus (Also known as ma-kon-kom or pak-e-hum in Thailand)
- Marum, the Third Heaven according to Shi'ite sources
