= Teucrium balfourii =

Conservation status
- Least Concern (IUCN 3.1)

Scientific classification
- Kingdom: Plantae
- Clade: Tracheophytes
- Clade: Angiosperms
- Clade: Eudicots
- Clade: Asterids
- Order: Lamiales
- Family: Lamiaceae
- Genus: Teucrium
- Species: T. balfourii

Binomial name
- Teucrium balfourii Vierh.

Synonyms
- Teucrium prostratum Balf.f.

Species of flowering plant

Teucrium balfourii is a perennial subshrub in the family Lamiaceae, native only to the islands of Socotra and Samhah in the Socotra Archipelago of Yemen.

It was formally described in 1907 by the Austrian botanist Friedrich Karl Max Vierhapper, based on material collected by Isaac Bayley Balfour in the late 19th century. The species is named in the latter′s honor.

== Description ==
This is a low, prostrate to spreading subshrub forming dense mats on rocky ground. Leaves are opposite and simple. Flowers are bilabiate with four nutlets per fruit, though detailed species-level floral characters are poorly documented.

=== Identification ===
Teucrium balfourii differs from the only other member of the genus present in the archipelago, Teucrium socotranum, in being ground-hugging and having succulent-looking leaves.

== Distribution and habitat ==
The species is restricted to the islands of Socotra and Samhah in the Socotra Archipelago. It grows mainly on rocky slopes and plateaus at mid elevations, particularly on limestone substrates in arid and semi-arid shrubland.

== Conservation ==
The species is listed as Least Concern on the IUCN Red List of Threatened Species. Although its range is geographically restricted, it is locally common and occurs across multiple sites within the archipelago, much of which is protected as a UNESCO World Heritage Site.
