= Jerrymander =

Jerrymanders, or Solifugae, are a group of arachnids.

Jerrymandering is a form of electoral manipulation.

== See also ==
- Germander, a group of plants
