= Teucrium pilbaranum =

Conservation status
- Priority Two — Poorly Known Taxa (DEC)

Scientific classification
- Kingdom: Plantae
- Clade: Tracheophytes
- Clade: Angiosperms
- Clade: Eudicots
- Clade: Asterids
- Order: Lamiales
- Family: Lamiaceae
- Genus: Teucrium
- Species: T. pilbaranum

Binomial name
- Teucrium pilbaranum Conn

Species of plant

Teucrium pilbaranum is a species of flowering plant in the family Lamiaceae, and is endemic to the Pilbara region of Western Australia. It is an upright subshrub with three-part or deeply-lobed leaves and white flowers.

== Description ==
Teucrium pilbaranum is an upright subshrub that typically grows to a height of up to 20 cm (7.9 in), with branches that are square in cross-section and sparsely hairy. The leaves are arranged in opposite pairs, three-part or deeply-lobed, the segments narrow egg-shaped 10–20 mm (0.39–0.79 in) long, 2–4 mm (0.079–0.157 in) wide and sometimes covered with glandular hairs. The flowers are arranged in groups of between four and eight near the ends of the stems, each flower in a leaf axil. The five sepals are 3–4 mm (0.12–0.16 in) long, joined at the base for about half their length, and more or less glabrous. The petals are white, 5.5–6.5 mm (0.22–0.26 in) long with the lower middle lobe about 3.5 mm (0.14 in) long and 2–2.5 mm (0.079–0.098 in) wide. The four stamens have filaments 8 mm (0.31 in) long. Flowering has been observed in May and September.

== Taxonomy ==
Teucrium pilbaranum was first formally described in 1999 by Barry Conn in the journal Telopea from specimens collected by Andrew Mitchell near Mulga Downs homestead in 1995. The specific epithet (pilbaranum) refers to the occurrence of this species in the Pilbara region.

== Distribution and habitat ==
This germander grows in the floodplain of the Fortescue River in the Pilbara biogeographic region of Western Australia. It is typically found on clay soils along the floodplain and margins of calcrete tables in open eucalyptus woodland.

== Conservation status ==
Teucrium pilbaranum is listed as "Priority Two" by the Western Australian Government Department of Parks and Wildlife meaning that it is poorly known and from only one or a few locations.
