= Teucrium glandulosum =

Desert germander

Scientific classification
- Kingdom: Plantae
- Clade: Tracheophytes
- Clade: Angiosperms
- Clade: Eudicots
- Clade: Asterids
- Order: Lamiales
- Family: Lamiaceae
- Genus: Teucrium
- Species: T. glandulosum

Binomial name
- Teucrium glandulosum Kellogg

Species of flowering plant

Teucrium glandulosum is a species of flowering plant in the mint family known by the common names sticky germander and desert germander. It is native to the Sonoran Desert of Arizona, Baja California, Baja California Sur, and San Bernardino County in California. It grows in rocky desert habitat such as canyons. The plant produces three-lobed leaves on its branching stem. The flowers have purple-streaked white corollas up to 2 centimeters long each with a large lower lobe and smaller lateral lobes. The inside of the flower is very hairy.
