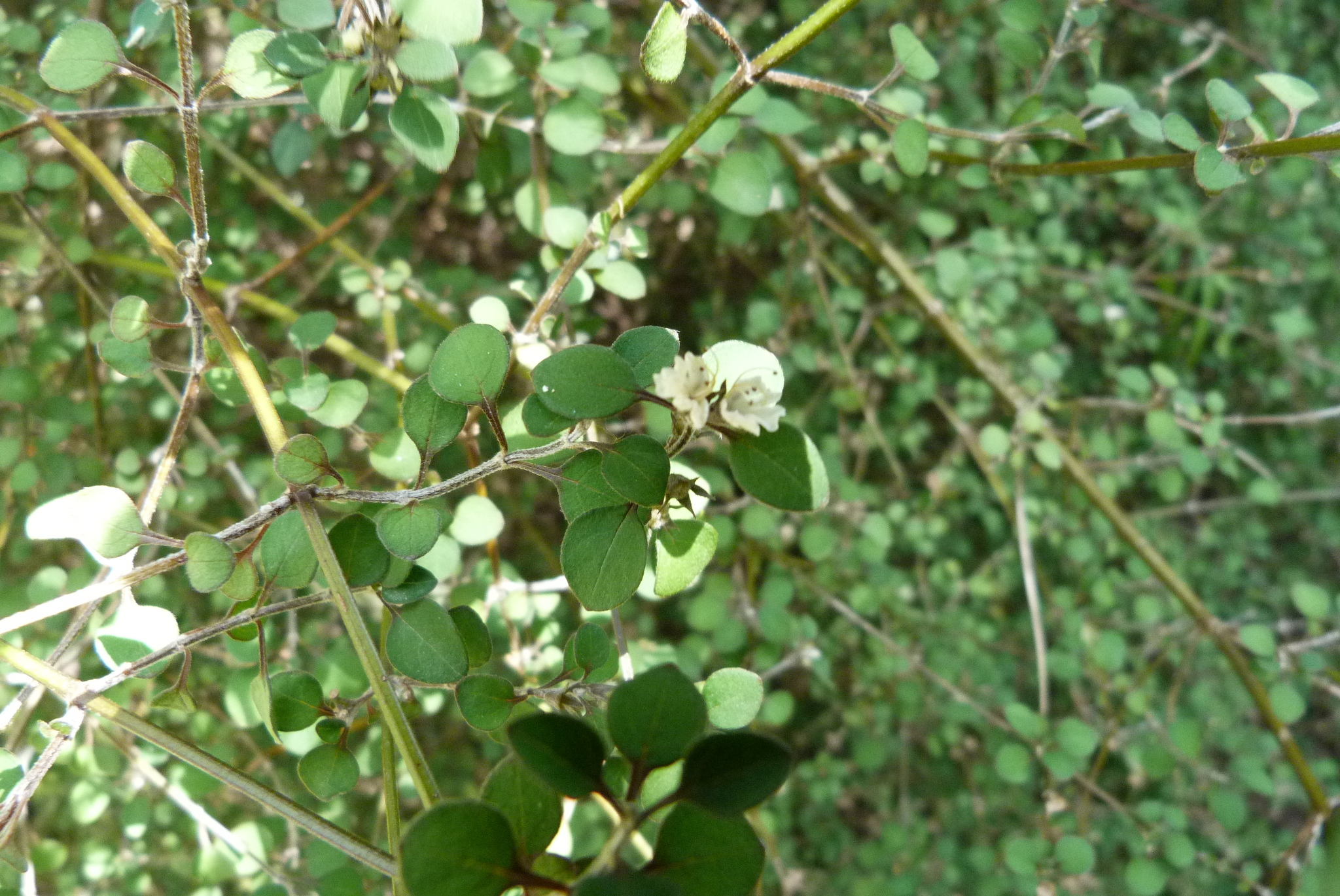
- Growing in Christchurch, New Zealand

Scientific classification
- Kingdom: Plantae
- Clade: Tracheophytes
- Clade: Angiosperms
- Clade: Eudicots
- Clade: Asterids
- Order: Lamiales
- Family: Lamiaceae
- Genus: Teucrium
- Species: T. parvifolium

Binomial name
- Teucrium parvifolium (Hook.f.) Kattari & Salmaki

Synonyms
- Teucridium parvifolium Hook.f.

= Teucrium parvifolium =

Species of plant

Teucrium parvifolium is a species of flowering plant in the family Lamiaceae, first described by Joseph Dalton Hooker in 1853 as Teucridium parvifolium. When placed in Teucridium, it was the only species in that genus. It is endemic to New Zealand.

A previously described sub-species Teucridium parvifolium var. luxurians Cheeseman (Labiatae) has recently been regarded as a synonym. The larger leaves of the 4 collected specimens having been found to be within the range of leaf size of the parent species.

The leaf miner moth Sabulopteryxbotanica Hoare & Patrick, sp. nov. (Lepidoptera, Gracillariidae, Gracillariinae) was first described in 2019. The larvae of the moth are underside leaf miners found only on Teucrium parvifolium. The moth was first found on herbarium specimens of T. parvifolium collected in 1961 but it took until 2013 for an adult moth to be found

The current threat classification is "At Risk - Declining"

== Description ==
Erect closely branched softly wooded shrub up to c. 1·5 m. tall; branchlets 4-angled, pubescent when young. Lvs on petioles ± 4–12 mm. long. Lamina ± 4–12–(15) mm. long, broad-ovate to ovate-oblong to suborbicular, membr., sts irregularly lobed. Fls axillary, solitary or in very small, few-fld cymes on very short, 2-bracted peduncles. Calyx-lobes subulate, persistent; corolla pubescent, white, sts flushed pale blue. Cocci ("pyrenes") hispid.

Teucrium parvifolium is a tangled shrub up to 2m high and to 2m wide. The branches and twigs are square in cross section. The leaves are small, dull yellow green to brown green, mostly round but sometimes pointed. On the finely hairy stem the leaves are opposite.

== Distribution ==
Plants are found sporadically from Northland to Southland, mostly in the east of both islands.

== Gallery ==
Leaves

Habit
