= Teucrium oliverianum =

Scientific classification
- Kingdom: Plantae
- Clade: Embryophytes
- Clade: Tracheophytes
- Clade: Spermatophytes
- Clade: Angiosperms
- Clade: Eudicots
- Clade: Asterids
- Order: Lamiales
- Family: Lamiaceae
- Genus: Teucrium
- Species: T. oliverianum

Binomial name
- Teucrium oliverianum Ging. ex Benth.

Species of flowering plant

Teucrium oliverianum is a species of flowering plant in the family Lamiaceae, native to the Gulf States, Iran, Iraq, Kuwait, Lebanon-Syria, Oman, and Saudi Arabia. It was first described by George Bentham, who attributed the name to Frédéric Gingins de la Sarraz, in 1835.
