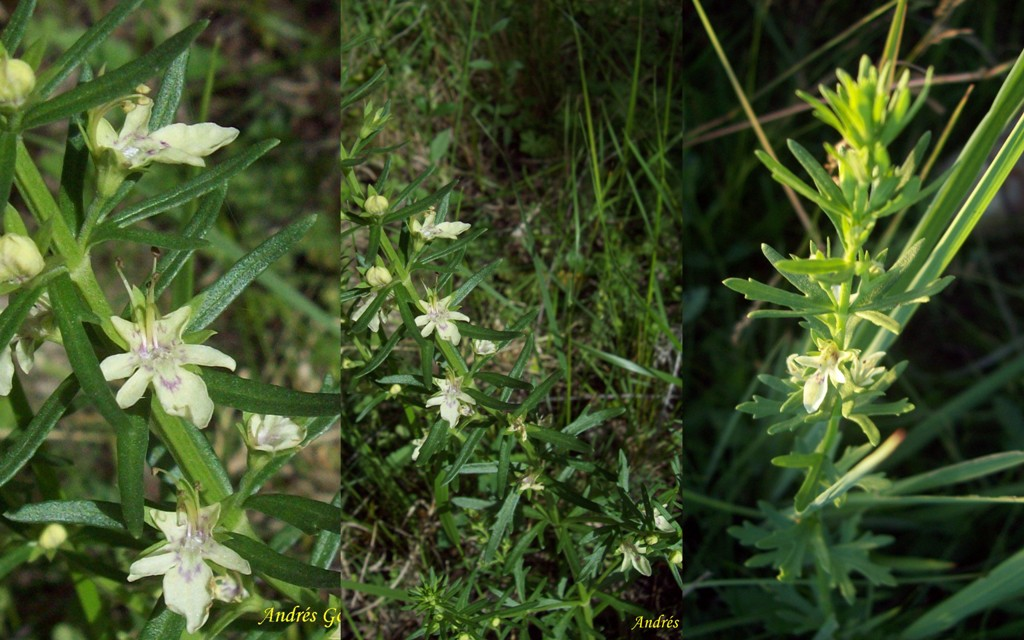

Scientific classification
- Kingdom: Plantae
- Clade: Tracheophytes
- Clade: Angiosperms
- Clade: Eudicots
- Clade: Asterids
- Order: Lamiales
- Family: Lamiaceae
- Genus: Teucrium
- Species: T. cubense

Binomial name
- Teucrium cubense Jacq.

= Teucrium cubense =

Small coastal germander

Species of flowering plant

Teucrium cubense is a species of flowering plant in the mint family known by the common names small coastal germander and dwarf germander. It is native to a section of the Americas that includes the southwestern - south-central United States (California, Arizona, New Mexico, Texas, Oklahoma, Louisiana, Alabama), parts of the Caribbean, Mexico, Costa Rica, and southern South America (Argentina, Uruguay, southern Brazil). In general, the plant has lobed leaves and a flower corolla with a broad lower lobe and smaller lateral lobes. The flower may be white or blue-tinged with purple speckles.

This plant may have antidiabetic effects.
