= Teucrium myriocladum =

Scientific classification
- Kingdom: Plantae
- Clade: Tracheophytes
- Clade: Angiosperms
- Clade: Eudicots
- Clade: Asterids
- Order: Lamiales
- Family: Lamiaceae
- Genus: Teucrium
- Species: T. myriocladum

Binomial name
- Teucrium myriocladum Diels

Species of flowering plant

Teucrium myriocladum is a species of flowering plant in the family Lamiaceae and is endemic to the south-west of Western Australia. It is a shrub with small, hairy leaves and creamy-green flowers.

== Description ==
Teucrium myriocladum is a shrub that typically grows to a height of 10–30 cm (3.9–11.8 in) with stems that are square in cross-section. The leaves are arranged in opposite pairs, 4–15 mm (0.16–0.59 in) long, about 1 mm (0.039 in) wide and covered with glandular hairs. The flowers are borne in leaf axils near the ends of branches on a pedicel 1.5–2.5 mm (0.059–0.098 in) long with bracts 1–1.5 mm (0.039–0.059 in) long. The five sepals are 1.5–3 mm (0.059–0.118 in) long and joined at the base. The petals are creamy-green, 7–12 mm (0.28–0.47 in) long with a pouch on the middle lobe, and there are four stamens. Flowering mainly occurs from August to December, usually following rain.

== Taxonomy ==
Teucrium myriocladum was formally described in 1904 by Ludwig Diels in Botanische Jahrbücher für Systematik, Pflanzengeschichte und Pflanzengeographie. The specific epithet (myriocladum) means "countless branches".

== Distribution and habitat ==
This germander grows on plains and flats in open mallee woodland near Esperance in the south-west of Western Australia.

== Conservation status ==
Teucrium myriocladum is classified as "not threatened" by the Western Australian Government Department of Parks and Wildlife.
