= Teucrium grandiusculum =

Scientific classification
- Kingdom: Plantae
- Clade: Tracheophytes
- Clade: Angiosperms
- Clade: Eudicots
- Clade: Asterids
- Order: Lamiales
- Family: Lamiaceae
- Genus: Teucrium
- Species: T. grandiusculum

Binomial name
- Teucrium grandiusculum F.Muell. & Tate

Species of plants

Teucrium grandiusculum is a species of flowering plant in the family Lamiaceae and is endemic to central Australia. It is a perennial herb or shrub with toothed, egg-shaped leaves and white flowers.

== Description ==
Teucrium grandiusculum is a perennial herb or shrub that typically grows to a height of 80 cm (31 in) with stems that are square in cross-section and covered with glandular hairs. The leaves are arranged in opposite pairs, egg-shaped with the narrower end towards the base, 8–30 mm (0.31–1.18 in) long, 6–20 mm (0.24–0.79 in) wide and sessile with between five and seventeen teeth or serrations on each edge. The flowers are borne in groups of up to three with leaf-like bracts at the base. The sepals are 6–8 mm (0.24–0.31 in) long and joined along their lower half, the petals are white and there are four stamens.

== Taxonomy ==
Teucrium grandiusculum was formally described in 1890 by Ferdinand von Mueller and Ralph Tate in Transactions, Proceedings and Report, Royal Society of South Australia. The specific epithet (grandiusculum) means "very nearly grown up".

In 1985, Hellmut R. Toelken described two subspecies of T. grandiusculum and the names are accepted by the Australian Plant Census:

- Teucrium grandiusculum F.Muell. & Tate subsp. grandiusculum has branches with a few hairs up to 0.3 mm (0.012 in) long;
- Teucrium grandiusculum subsp. pilosum Toelken has branches densely covered with hairs up to 1.5 mm (0.059 in) long.

== Distribution and habitat ==
This germander grows on rocky slopes and along watercourses in scattered locations on the Tomkinson Ranges near the border between Western Australia, South Australia the Northern Territory. Subspecies pilosum is only known from two locations near Ooldea.

== Conservation status ==
Teucrium grandiusculum is classified as "not threatened" by the Western Australian Government Department of Parks and Wildlife but as "near threatened" under the Northern Territory Government Territory Parks and Wildlife Conservation Act 1976.
