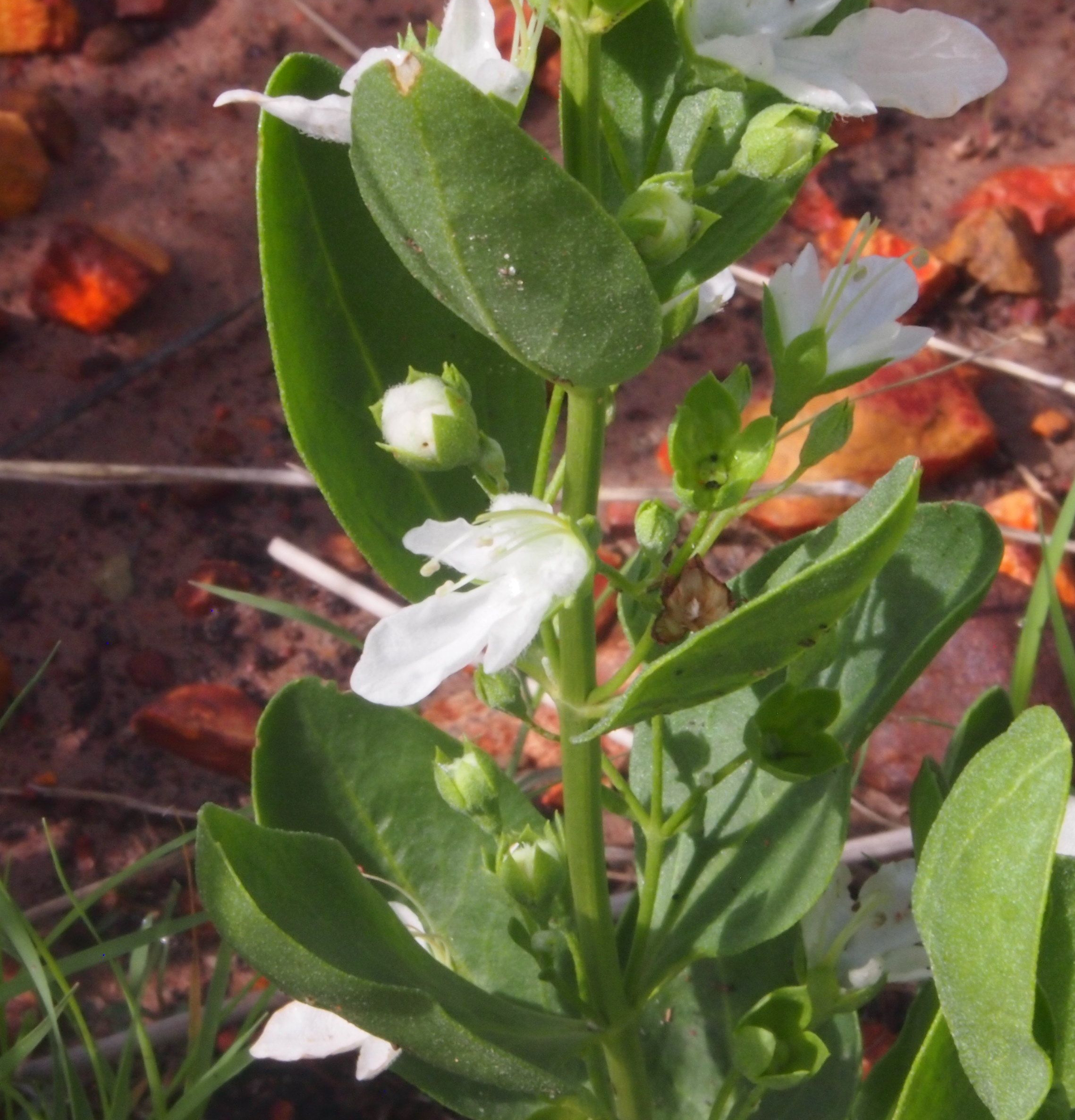
- Teucrium integrifolium near Camooweal

Scientific classification
- Kingdom: Plantae
- Clade: Tracheophytes
- Clade: Angiosperms
- Clade: Eudicots
- Clade: Asterids
- Order: Lamiales
- Family: Lamiaceae
- Genus: Teucrium
- Species: T. integrifolium

Binomial name
- Teucrium integrifolium Benth.

= Teucrium integrifolium =

Teucry weed

Species of plants

Teucrium integrifolium, commonly known as teucry weed or green germander, is a species of flowering plant in the family Lamiaceae and is endemic to northern Australia. It is a perennial herb with broadly elliptic to broadly egg-shaped leaves and white or cream-coloured flowers.

== Description ==
Teucrium integrifolium is a perennial herb that typically grows to a height of 15–60 cm (5.9–23.6 in) with stems that are square in cross-section and covered with glandular hairs. The leaves are arranged in opposite pairs, broadly egg-shaped to broadly elliptic, 10–35 mm (0.39–1.38 in) long and 2–10 mm (0.079–0.394 in) wide. The flowers are arranged singly in leaf axils on a pedicel 2–3 mm (0.079–0.118 in) long with bracts 0.8–1 mm (0.031–0.039 in) long. The sepals are 2.7–3.5 mm (0.11–0.14 in) long, the petals are white or cream-coloured, 6–10 mm (0.24–0.39 in) long and there are four stamens.

== Taxonomy ==
Teucrium integrifolium was formally described in 1870 by George Bentham in Flora Australiensis. The specific epithet (integrifolium) means "whole-leaved", referring to the leaves not being toothed or lobed.

== Distribution and habitat ==
Teucry weed grows in grassland and woodland on black clay soil and is widespread in Queensland and the Northern Territory. There are also scattered populations in the Ord Victoria Plain region of Western Australia.

== Conservation status ==
Teucrium integrifolium is classified as "not threatened" by the Western Australian Government Department of Parks and Wildlife, and as of "least concern" under the Queensland Government Nature Conservation Act 1992 and the Northern Territory Government Territory Parks and Wildlife Conservation Act 1976.
