= Teucrium micranthum =

Scientific classification
- Kingdom: Plantae
- Clade: Tracheophytes
- Clade: Angiosperms
- Clade: Eudicots
- Clade: Asterids
- Order: Lamiales
- Family: Lamiaceae
- Genus: Teucrium
- Species: T. micranthum

Binomial name
- Teucrium micranthum Conn

Species of plant

Teucrium micranthum is a species of flowering plant in the family Lamiaceae, and is endemic to a restricted area of Queensland. It is an erect subshrub with small, aromatic, egg-shaped to elliptic leaves and small white flowers.

== Description ==
Teucrium micranthum is an erect subshrub that typically grows to a height of 10–30 cm (3.9–11.8 in), with moderately to densely hairy branches that are square in cross-section. The leaves are aromatic and arranged in opposite pairs, egg-shaped to elliptic, 4–7 mm (0.16–0.28 in) long and 3–7 mm (0.12–0.28 in) wide on a petiole up to 1 mm (0.039 in) long. The flowers are arranged in groups of between four and twenty, each flower in a leaf axil. The five sepals are about 2 mm (0.079 in) long, joined at the base for about half their length, and densely hairy on the outside. The petals are white, 2.5–3 mm (0.098–0.118 in) long and barely longer than the sepals.

== Taxonomy ==
Teucrium micranthum was first formally described in 2002 by Barry Conn in the journal Telopea from specimens collected in Carnarvon National Park in 1999. The specific epithet (micranthum) refers to the small petals of this species.

== Distribution and habitat ==
This germander grows in woodland and forest with brigalow and Eucalyptus species between Springsure and Charleville in the North Kennedy and Leichhardt botanical districts of Queensland.

== Conservation status ==
Teucrium micranthum is listed as of "least concern" under the Queensland Government Nature Conservation Act 1992.
