= Teucrium reidii =

Scientific classification
- Kingdom: Plantae
- Clade: Tracheophytes
- Clade: Angiosperms
- Clade: Eudicots
- Clade: Asterids
- Order: Lamiales
- Family: Lamiaceae
- Genus: Teucrium
- Species: T. reidii

Binomial name
- Teucrium reidii Toelken & D.Dean Cunn.

Species of flowering plant

Teucrium reidii is a species of flowering plant in the family Lamiaceae, and is endemic to north-western South Australia. It is a shrub with egg-shaped leaves with blunt teeth on the edges, and white flowers arranged in spike-like groups.

== Description ==
Teucrium reidii is a shrub that typically grows to a height of up to 2 m (6 ft 7 in) and has stems that are square in cross-section but with rounded edges. The leaves are egg-shaped to oblong, mostly 30–50 mm (1.2–2.0 in) long and 20–30 mm (0.79–1.18 in) wide on a petiole 8–15 mm (0.31–0.59 in) long. There are blunt teeth on the edges of the leaves and the lower surface is a lighter shade of green. The flowers are arranged in a spike-like thyrse with elliptic bracts 5.2–8.4 mm (0.20–0.33 in) long. The five sepals are about 6 mm (0.24 in) long, joined at the base for about half their length, and densely hairy on their outer surface. The petals are white with the lower middle lobe 5.8–6.6 mm (0.23–0.26 in) long and the four stamens are 9–11 mm (0.35–0.43 in) long. Flowering occurs from August to October.

== Taxonomy ==
Teucrium reidii was first formally described in 2008 by Hellmut R. Toelken and Darrell Dean Cunningham in the Journal of the Adelaide Botanic Gardens from specimens collected by W.S. Reid (1908–1995) on Mount Harriet in north-western South Australia on 30 September 1955.

== Distribution and habitat ==
This germander grows between boulders at higher altitudes in a few locations in the north-west of South Australia.
