= Teucrium sessiliflorum =

Camel bush

Scientific classification
- Kingdom: Plantae
- Clade: Tracheophytes
- Clade: Angiosperms
- Clade: Eudicots
- Clade: Asterids
- Order: Lamiales
- Family: Lamiaceae
- Genus: Teucrium
- Species: T. sessiliflorum

Binomial name
- Teucrium sessiliflorum Benth.

Species of plants

Teucrium sessiliflorum, commonly known as camel bush, is a species of flowering plant in the family Lamiaceae and is endemic to southern continental Australia. It is a tufted perennial herb with hairy, egg-shaped, lobed leaves and white or cream-coloured flowers.

== Description ==
Teucrium sessiliflorum is a tufted perennial herb that typically grows to a height of 25 cm (9.8 in) and often forms suckers. The leaves are arranged in opposite pairs, egg-shaped in outline, 5–30 mm (0.20–1.18 in) long and 3–15 mm (0.12–0.59 in) wide and more or less deeply lobed with between two and five lobes in the upper half. The flowers are arranged singly or in pairs near the ends of the stems and are sessile at the base of a leaf-like bract. The sepals are 4.5–7 mm (0.18–0.28 in) long forming a tube in the lower half, and the petals are white or cream-coloured The lower middle petal lobe is 5–8 mm (0.20–0.31 in) long and there are four stamens. Flowering occurs from August to October.

== Taxonomy ==
Teucrium sessiliflorum was formally described in 1848 by George Bentham in de Candolle's Prodromus Systematis Naturalis Regni Vegetabilis. The specific epithet (sessiliflorum) means "sessile-flowered".

== Distribution and habitat ==
Camel bush grows in mallee in sandy soil and occurs south of Hillston in New South Wales, in the far north-west of Victoria, south-eastern South Australia and south-western Western Australia.

== Conservation status ==
Teucrium sessiliflorum is classified as "not threatened" by the Western Australian Government Department of Parks and Wildlife.
