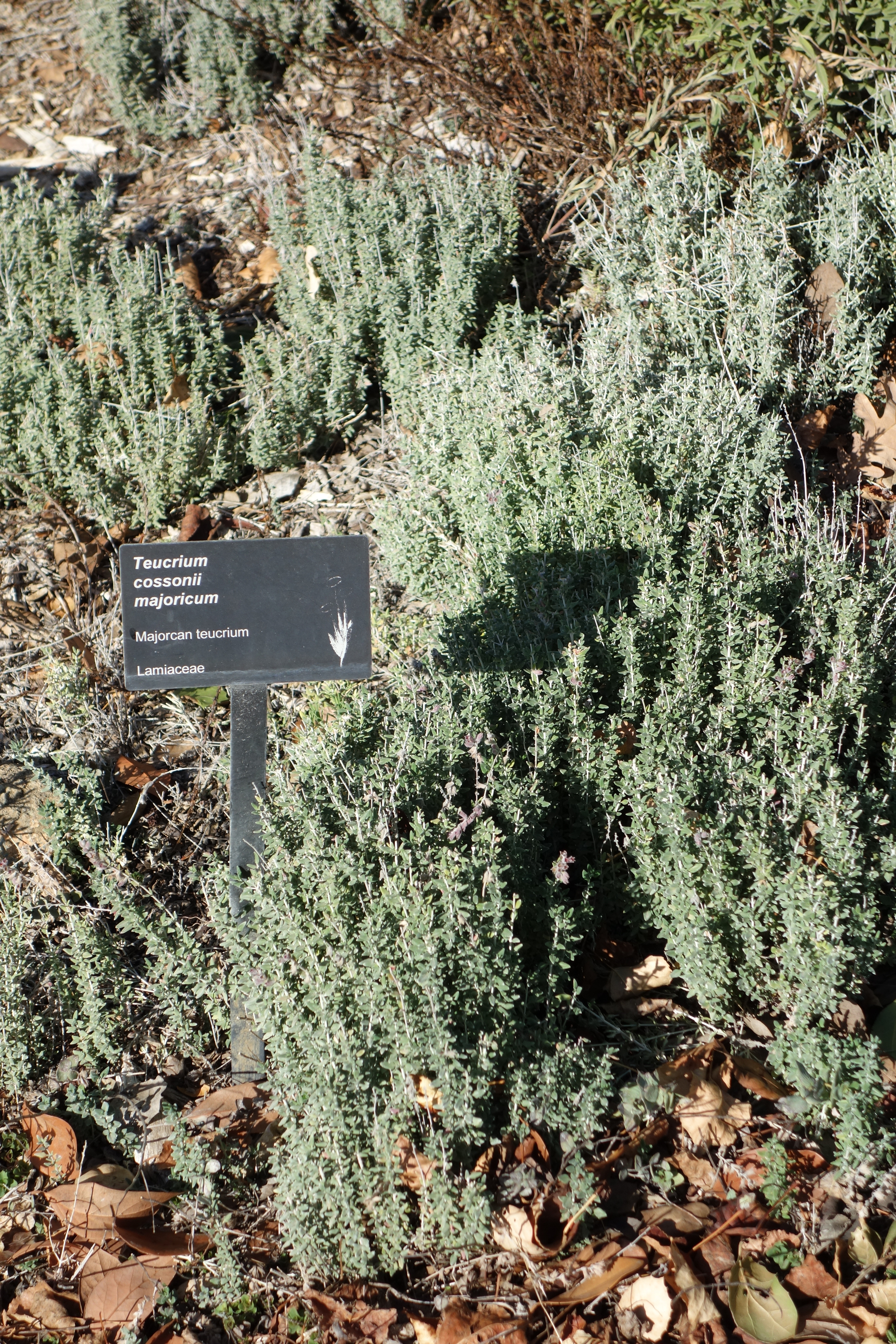

Scientific classification
- Kingdom: Plantae
- Clade: Tracheophytes
- Clade: Angiosperms
- Clade: Eudicots
- Clade: Asterids
- Order: Lamiales
- Family: Lamiaceae
- Genus: Teucrium
- Species: T. cossonii

Binomial name
- Teucrium cossonii D.Wood

= Teucrium cossonii =

Species of herb

Teucrium cossonii, the fruity germander, is a perennial herb in the family Lamiaceae, endemic to the Balearic Islands.
