= Teucrium balthazaris =

Conservation status
- Near Threatened (IUCN 3.1)

Scientific classification
- Kingdom: Plantae
- Clade: Tracheophytes
- Clade: Angiosperms
- Clade: Eudicots
- Clade: Asterids
- Order: Lamiales
- Family: Lamiaceae
- Genus: Teucrium
- Species: T. balthazaris

Binomial name
- Teucrium balthazaris Sennen

Species of flowering plant

Teucrium balthazaris is a species of flowering plant in the family Lamiaceae. It is found only in Spain. Its natural habitat is Mediterranean-type shrubby vegetation. It is threatened by habitat loss.
