= Teucrium disjunctum =

Scientific classification
- Kingdom: Plantae
- Clade: Tracheophytes
- Clade: Angiosperms
- Clade: Eudicots
- Clade: Asterids
- Order: Lamiales
- Family: Lamiaceae
- Genus: Teucrium
- Species: T. disjunctum

Binomial name
- Teucrium disjunctum K.R.Thiele & K.A.Sheph.

Synonyms
- Spartothamnella canescens K.R.Thiele & K.A.Sheph.

Species of flowering plant

Teucrium disjunctum is a species of flowering plant in the family Lamiaceae and is endemic to inland Australia. It is an erect, openly-branched, hairy, greyish-white shrub, usually with egg-shaped to elliptic leaves, and white flowers arranged singly in leaf axils.

== Description ==
Teucrium disjunctum is an erect, openly-branched shrub that typically grows to a height of 0.3–0.8 m (1 ft 0 in – 2 ft 7 in). Its branches are square in cross-section, greyish-green and covered with branched hairs and sessile glands. The leaves are egg-shaped to elliptic, 15–25 mm (0.59–0.98 in) long, 3–5 mm (0.12–0.20 in) wide, sessile and covered with greyish-white hairs. The flowers are arranged singly in the axils of leaf-like bracts near the ends of the stems, each flower sessile or on a short pedicel. The sepals are 3–3.5 mm (0.12–0.14 in) long, joined at the base for about 1 mm (0.039 in) with narrow triangular lobes. The petals are white, 8–12 mm (0.31–0.47 in) long, the lowest lobe 1.5–2 mm (0.059–0.079 in) long. Flowering occurs in most months with a peak from May to November and the fruit is spherical, glossy orange-red and 3–4 mm (0.12–0.16 in) in diameter.

== Taxonomy ==
This species was first formally described in 2014 by Kevin Thiele and Kelly Anne Shepherd and given the name Spartothamnella canescens in the journal Nuytsia. In 2017, Thiele and Shepherd changed the name to Teucrium disjunctum in a later edition of the same journal. The specific epithet (disjunctum) means "separate, distinct", referring to the three disjunct populations of this species.

== Distribution and habitat ==
This germander grows in on rocky hills, gorges and scree slopes, often in sheltered positions. It occurs in the southern Northern Territory and adjacent areas of Western Australia and in two disjunct populations in Western Australia - one in the Pilbara and the other further south in the Avon Wheatbelt, Coolgardie and Yalgoo biogeographic regions.

== Conservation status ==
Teucrium disjunctum is listed as "not threatened" in Western Australia but as "near threatened" under the Northern Territory Government Territory Parks and Wildlife Conservation Act 1976.
