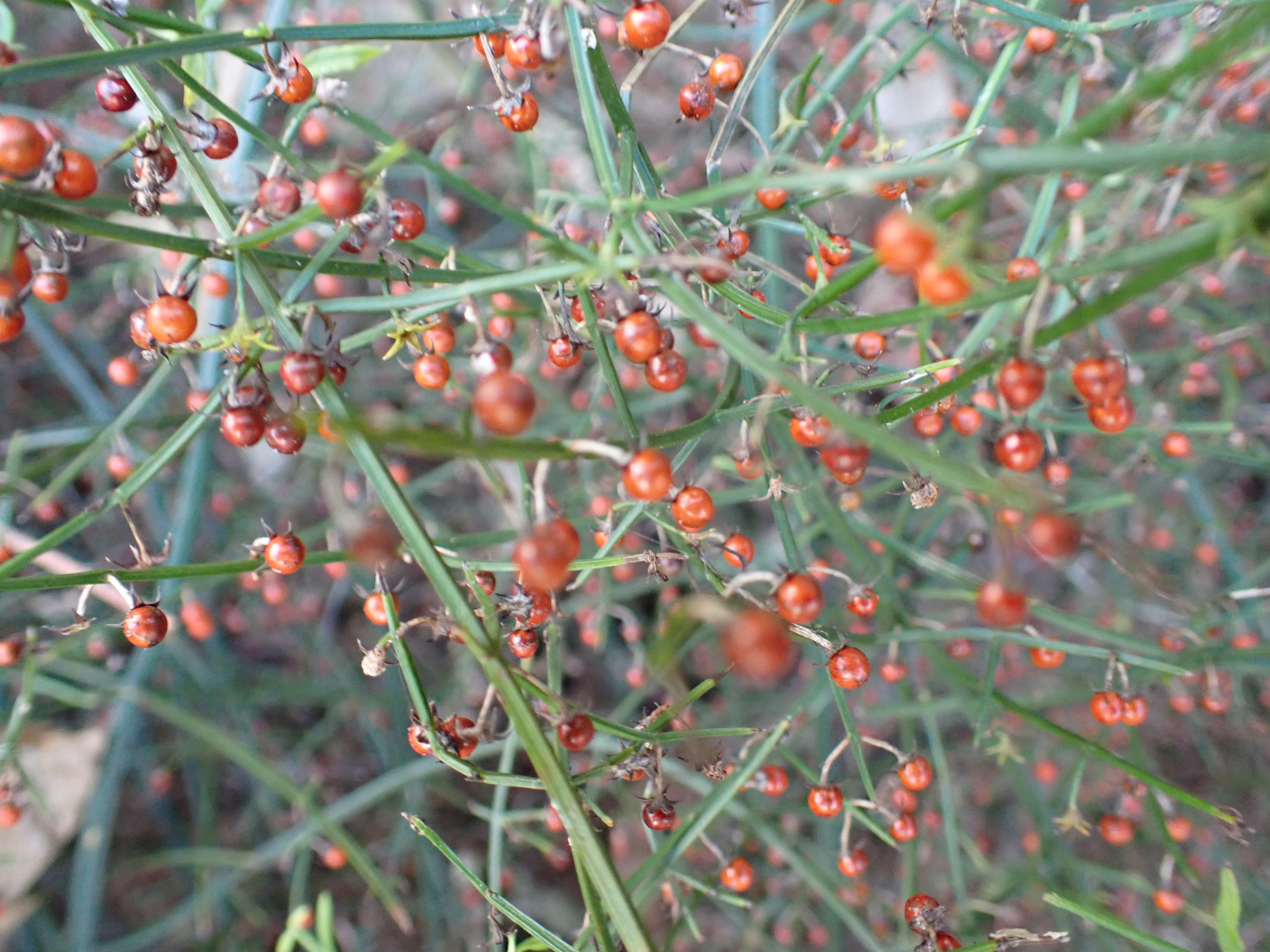
- In Mount Coot-tha Botanic Gardens

Scientific classification
- Kingdom: Plantae
- Clade: Tracheophytes
- Clade: Angiosperms
- Clade: Eudicots
- Clade: Asterids
- Order: Lamiales
- Family: Lamiaceae
- Genus: Teucrium
- Species: T. junceum

Binomial name
- Teucrium junceum (A.Cunn. ex Walp.) Kattari & Heubl

Synonyms
- Spartothamnella juncea (A.Cunn. ex Walp.) Briq.; Spartothamnus junceus A.Cunn. ex Loudon nom. inval., nom. nud.; Spartothamnus junceus A.Cunn. ex Walp. nom. inval., nom. nud.; Spartothamnus junceus A.Cunn. ex Walp.; Spartothamnus junceus A.Cunn. ex Walp. var. junceus

= Teucrium junceum =

Species of flowering plant

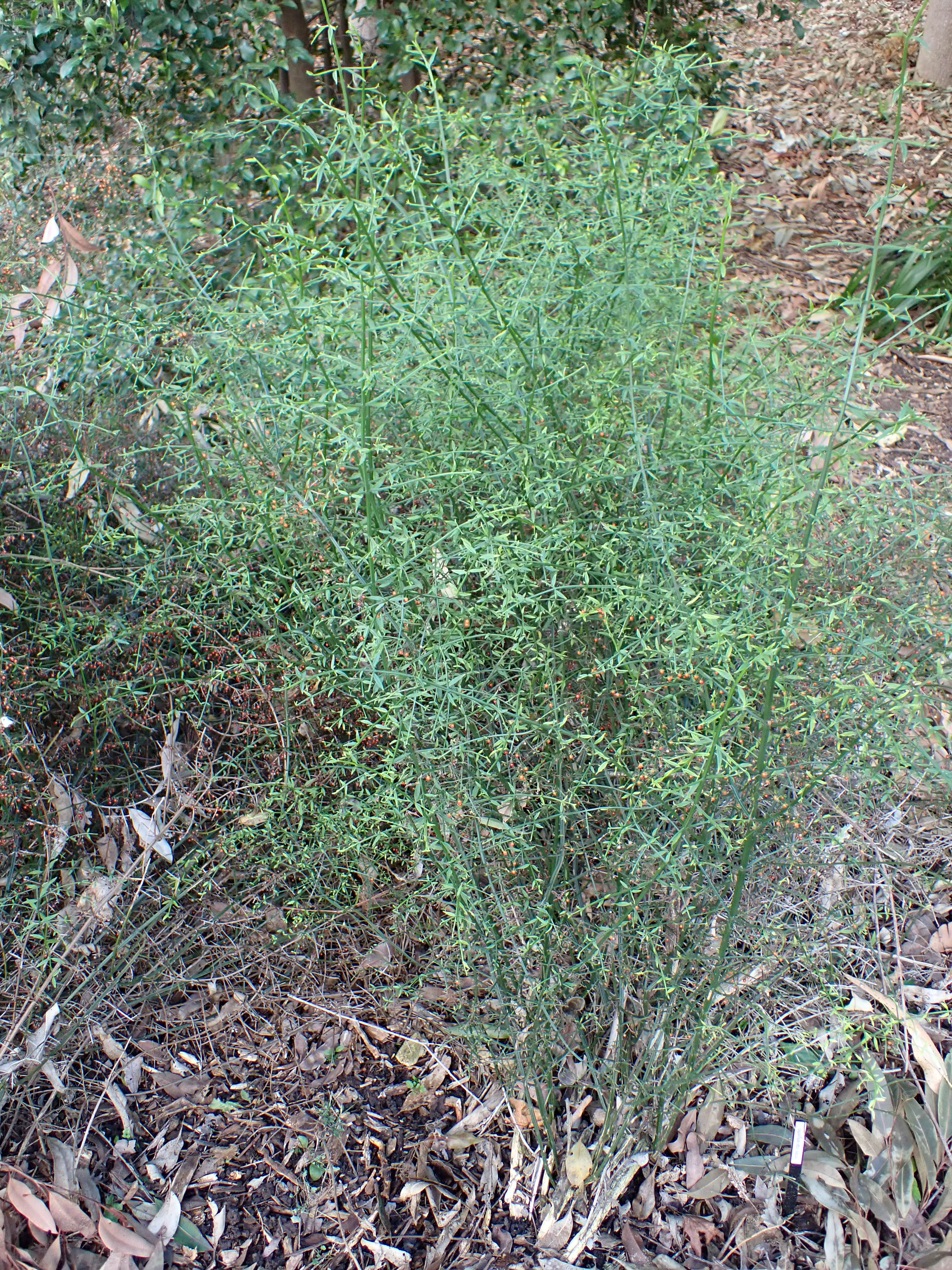
Habit

Teucrium junceum is a species of flowering plant in the family Lamiaceae, and is endemic to eastern Australia. It is a scrambling, openly-branched shrub, with small leaves, white flowers and orange to red fruit.

== Description ==
Teucrium junceum is an openly-branched, scrambling shrub that typically grows to a height of 1–2 m (3 ft 3 in – 6 ft 7 in) and has glabrous stems that are square in cross-section. The leaves are arranged in opposite pairs, narrow-elliptic or lance-shaped, 3–18 mm (0.12–0.71 in) long, 2–3 mm (0.079–0.118 in) wide but often scale-like or shed from older stems. The flowers are borne on a pedicel about 3 mm (0.12 in) long with scale-like bracts 0.5–1.5 mm (0.020–0.059 in) long. The five sepals are 1.5–2.5 mm (0.059–0.098 in) long, the petals white and 3–4 mm (0.12–0.16 in) long. Flowering mainly occurs in summer and the fruit is an orange to red drupe 2–4 mm (0.079–0.157 in) in diameter.

== Taxonomy ==
This germander was first formally described in 1847 by Allan Cunningham in Wilhelm Gerhard Walpers' Repertorium Botanices Systematicae, and was given the name Spartothamnus junceus. In 2016, Stefan Kattari and Günther Heubl changed the name to Teucrium junceum in the journal Taxon.

== Distribution and habitat ==
Teucrium junceum grows in dry forest, including dry rainforest. It is widespread in eastern Queensland, south from near Mount Surprise to near Camden in New South Wales.

== Conservation status ==
Teucrium junceum is listed as of "least concern" under the Queensland Government Nature Conservation Act 1992.
