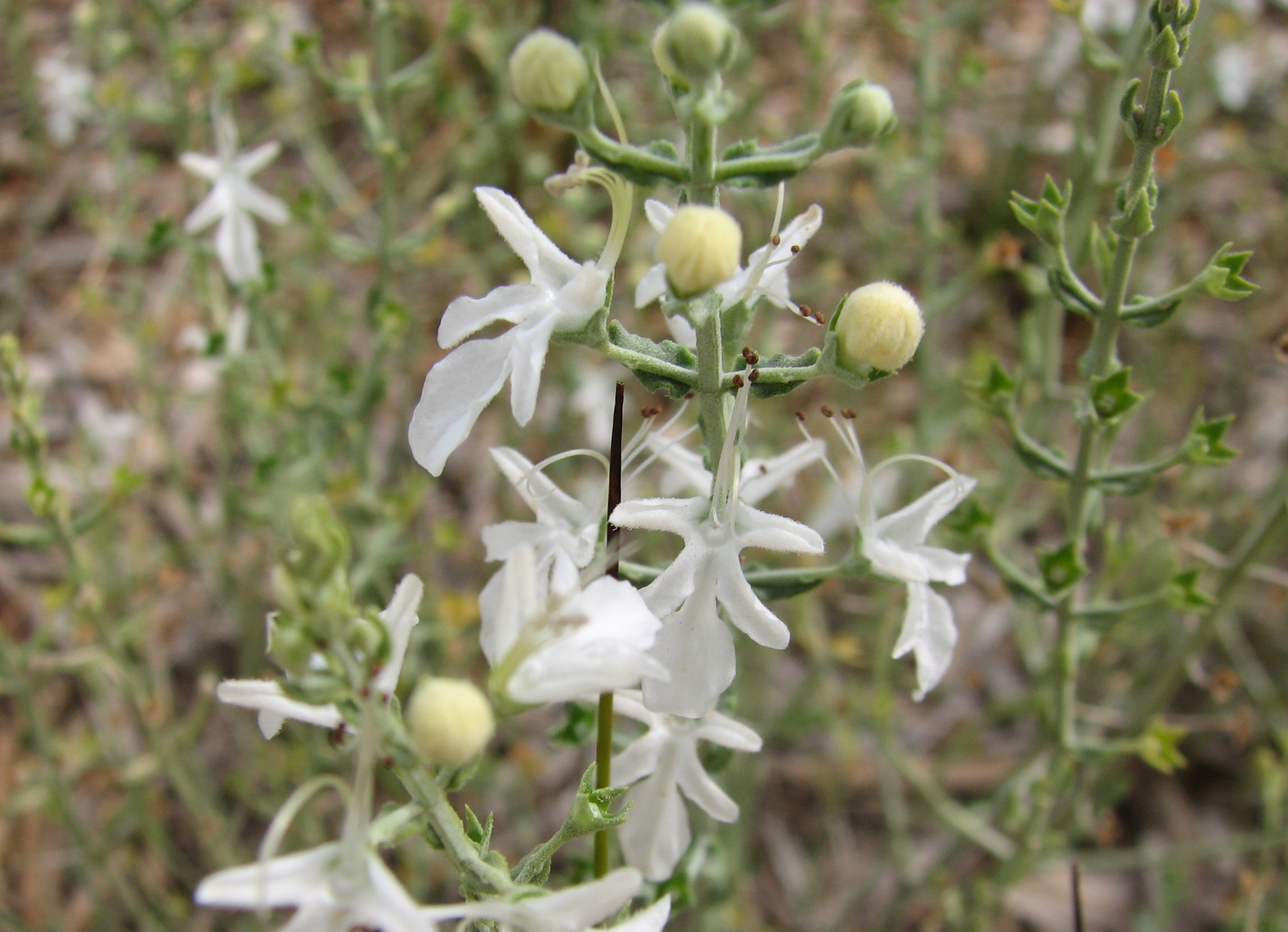
- In the Royal Botanic Gardens, Cranbourne

Scientific classification
- Kingdom: Plantae
- Clade: Tracheophytes
- Clade: Angiosperms
- Clade: Eudicots
- Clade: Asterids
- Order: Lamiales
- Family: Lamiaceae
- Genus: Teucrium
- Species: T. racemosum

Binomial name
- Teucrium racemosum R.Br.

= Teucrium racemosum =

Grey germander

Species of plant

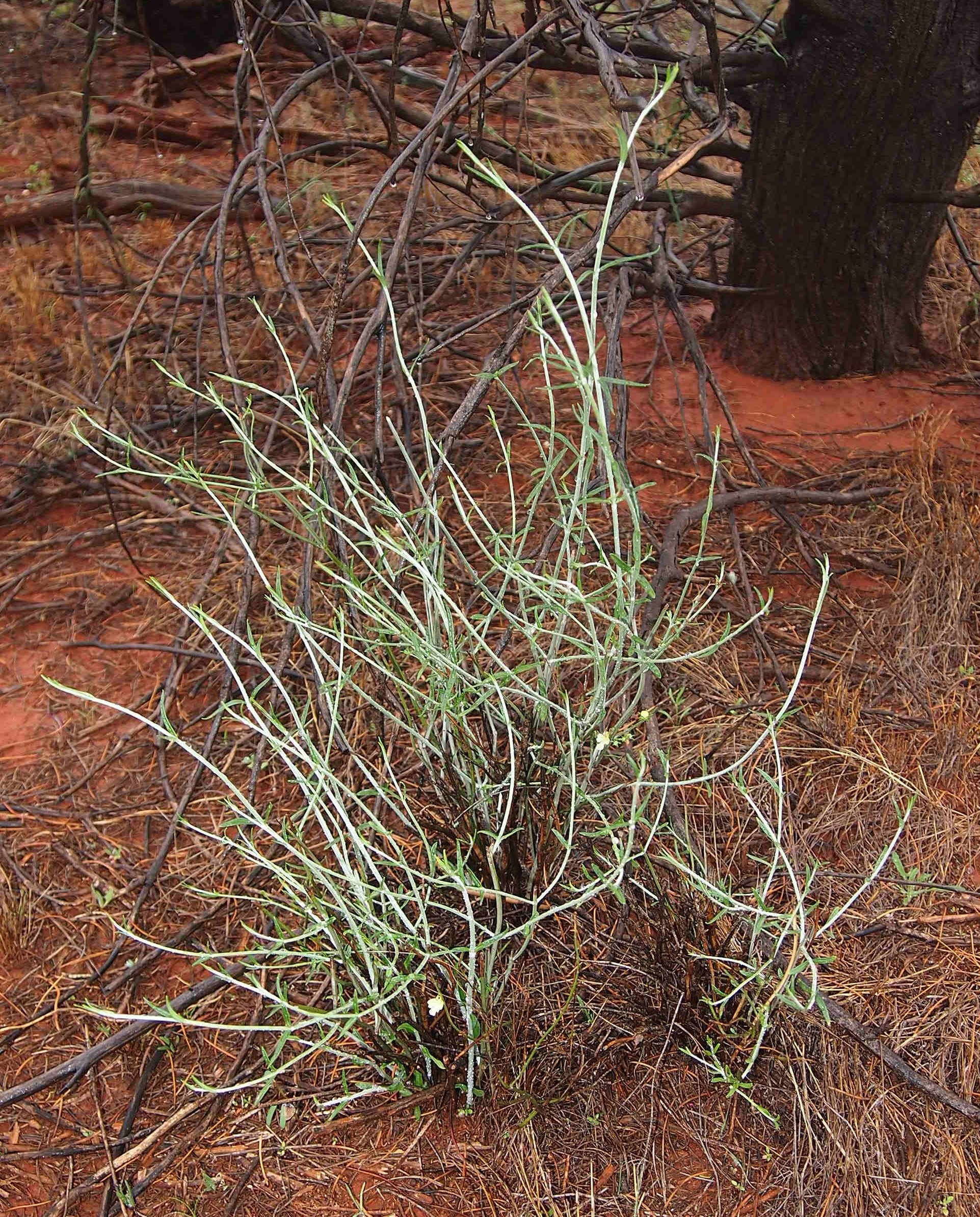
Habit

Teucrium racemosum, also commonly referred to as either the grey germander or forest germander, is a species of flowering plant in the family Lamiaceae. It is endemic to Australia and is found in all mainland states, the Northern Territory and the Australian Capital Territory. It grows in floodplains, dry lake beds and open woodlands. A perennial herb, it has four-sided, densely hairy stems, narrow egg-shaped leaves, and white flowers usually arranged singly in leaf axils. It grows to be between 15 and 40 cm tall.

== Description ==
Teucrium racemosum is a perennial herb that grows to a height of 15–40 cm (5.9–15.7 in). It is a root suckering plant, meaning that it spreads by pushing up new shoots around the perimeter of its original base. Due to this root suckering ability, it is not uncommon for the Teucrium racemosum to spread to a diameter of several metres. The stems are white or greyish and densely covered with curved hairs pressed against the stem but that are usually lost from the stem's ridges. The leaves are a narrow oval shape, densely hairy, especially on the lower surface, usually 10–20 mm (0.39–0.79 in) long and 2–6 mm (0.079–0.236 in) wide. The edges of the leaves are sometimes somewhat lobed, rolled under or wavy. The flowers are usually arranged singly in leaf axils near the ends of branches on a pedicel that is 5–18 mm (0.20–0.71 in) long. The pedicel is often horizontal near its far end with the flower held erect. The sepals are 3–6 mm (0.12–0.24 in) long, densely hairy and fused at the base for about half of their length. The petals are 8–14 mm (0.31–0.55 in) long, with the lower middle lobe usually 5–9 mm (0.20–0.35 in) long, the four stamens 8–14 mm (0.31–0.55 in) long. Flowering occurs from September to June.

== Taxonomy ==
Teucrium racemosum was first described in 1810 by Scottish botanist Robert Brown in his Prodromus Florae Novae Hollandiae. The specific epithet (racemosum) means 'racemose'.

== Distribution and habitat ==
Teucrium racemosum is found in all states and territories of Australia apart from Tasmania. It grows on floodplains, dry lake beds and open woodlands. It is also often found around ephemeral lakes or disturbed areas.

== Reproduction ==
As is the case with many Lamiaceae, Teucrium racemosum uses gynodioecy as a method of reproduction. Gynodioecy is a breeding system consisting of male and hermaphroditic plants in a population. Gynodioecy occurs as a consequence of genetic mutation that prevents a hermaphroditic plant from producing pollen, while keeping the female reproductive parts intact. In gynodioecious species, female plants often have much smaller anthers (the part of the stamen where pollen is produced) and as a result produce little to no pollen, whilst in hermaphroditic flowers both male and female sexes are functional. Genetic conflict often arises in these plants, and it is a common observation for female plants to produce more seeds and healthier, higher quality seed than the hermaphroditic plants. This is thought to be because of the extra energy that female plants have access to as a result of not producing pollen. Gynodioecy is an extremely rare form of reproduction, with the Teucrium racemosum being part of just 1% of all plants that exhibit a gynodioecious mating system. Flowering occurs from September to June.

== Conservation ==
Teucrium racemosum is listed as "not threatened" by the Western Australian Government Department of Parks and Wildlife, and as "least concern" under the Queensland Government Nature Conservation Act 1992 and the Northern Territory Government Territory Parks and Wildlife Conservation Act 1976.

== See also ==
- List of Teucrium species
