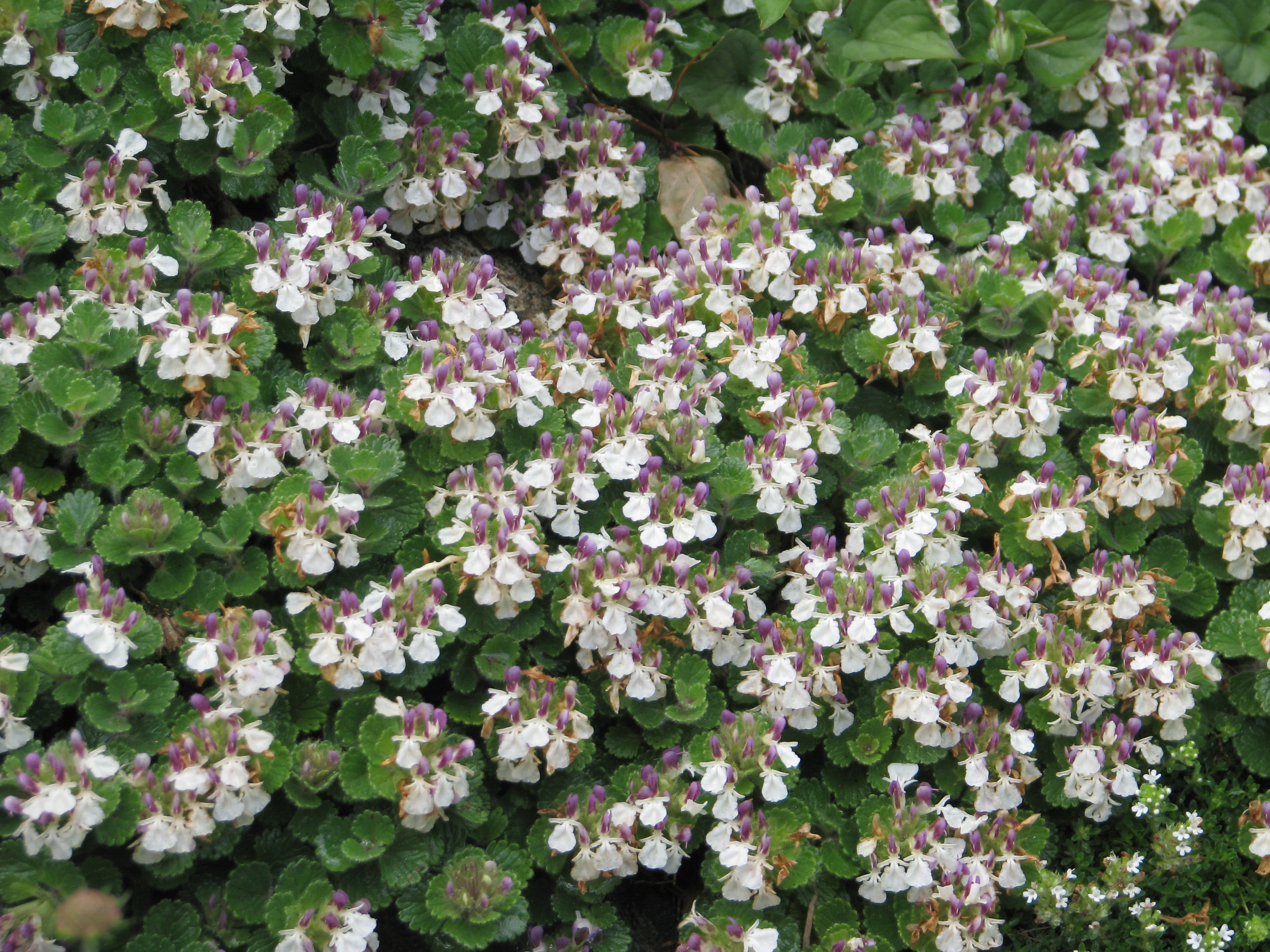

Scientific classification
- Kingdom: Plantae
- Clade: Tracheophytes
- Clade: Angiosperms
- Clade: Eudicots
- Clade: Asterids
- Order: Lamiales
- Family: Lamiaceae
- Genus: Teucrium
- Species: T. pyrenaicum

Binomial name
- Teucrium pyrenaicum L.

Synonyms
- Monochilon reptans (Pourr.) Dulac; Polium pyrenaicum (L.) Mill.; Teucrium hippolyti Sennen; Teucrium pyrenaicum subsp. pyrenaicum; Teucrium reptans Pourr.; Teucrium saxatile Lam.

= Teucrium pyrenaicum =

Species of plant in the mint family

Teucrium pyrenaicum, the Pyrenean germander, is a species of germander native to the Pyrenees. It has gained the Royal Horticultural Society's Award of Garden Merit.
