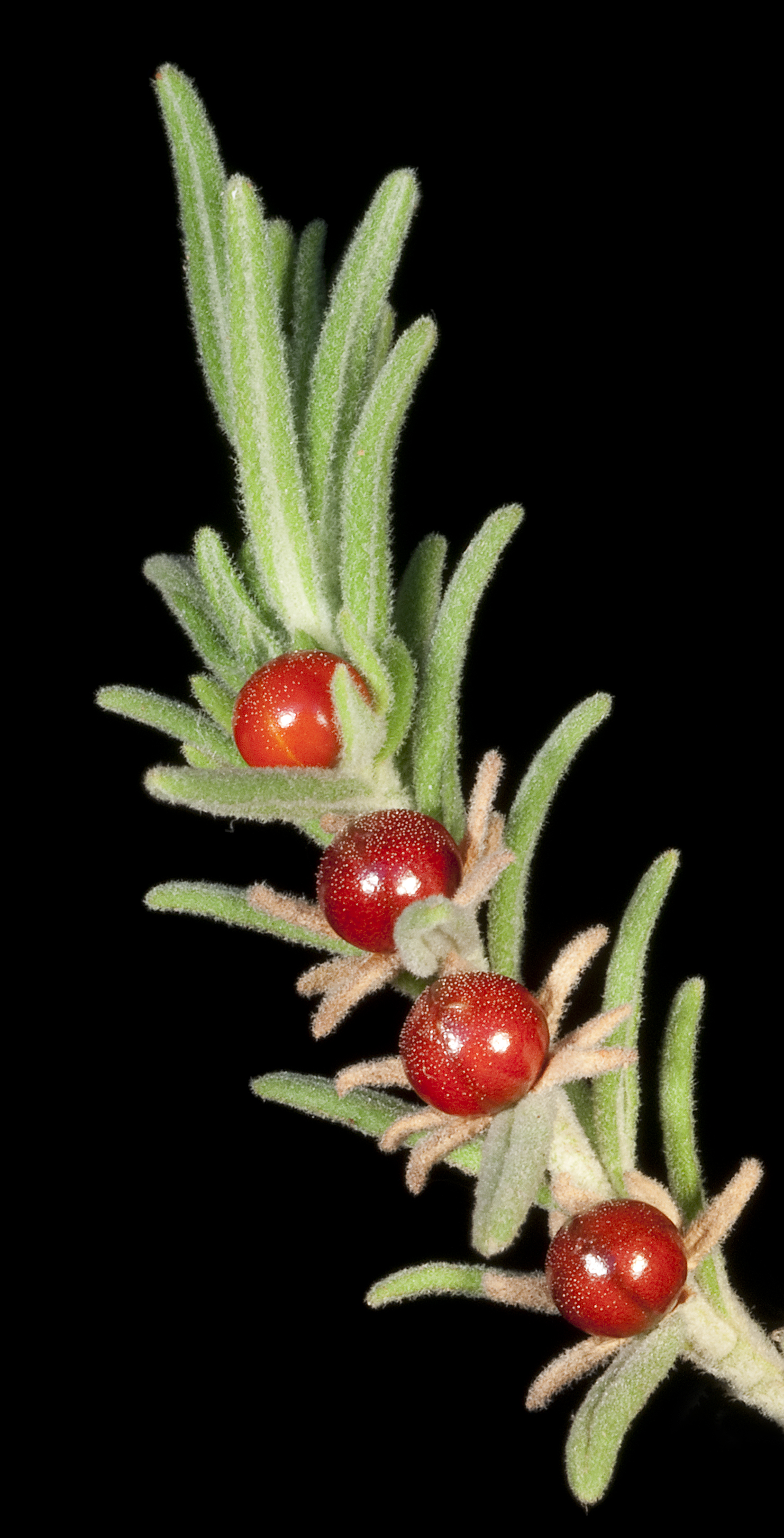

Scientific classification
- Kingdom: Plantae
- Clade: Tracheophytes
- Clade: Angiosperms
- Clade: Eudicots
- Clade: Asterids
- Order: Lamiales
- Family: Lamiaceae
- Genus: Teucrium
- Species: T. puberulum

Binomial name
- Teucrium puberulum (F.Muell.) Kattari & Bräuchler

Synonyms
- Spartothamnella puberula (F.Muell.) Maiden & Betche; Spartothamnella puberulus Maiden & Betche orth. var.; Spartothamnus junceus var. puberula F.Muell. orth. var.; Spartothamnus junceus var. puberulus F.Muell.; Spartothamnus puberulus F.Muell. nom. inval., nom. nud.; Spartothamnus puberulus (F.Muell.) F.Muell.

= Teucrium puberulum =

Species of flowering plant

Teucrium puberulum, commonly known as red berry stick plant, is a species of flowering plant in the family Lamiaceae, and is endemic to inland areas of eastern Australia. It is an erect shrub covered with star-shaped hairs, and with linear to lance-shaped leaves, greenish-white flowers and reddish fruit.

== Description ==
Teucrium puberulum is an erect shrub that typically grows to a height of 0.5–1 m (1 ft 8 in – 3 ft 3 in) and is covered with star-shaped hairs. The leaves are arranged in opposite pairs, linear to lance-shaped, 5–30 mm (0.20–1.18 in) long, 2–6 mm (0.079–0.236 in) wide and sessile with the edges turned downwards. The flowers are sessile and arranged in upper leaf axils with leafy bracts 5–15 mm (0.20–0.59 in) long. The five sepals are 2–4 mm (0.079–0.157 in) long and the petals are greenish-white 2.5–3 mm (0.098–0.118 in) long. Flowering occurs in spring and summer and the fruit is a reddish drupe, 2.5–4 mm (0.098–0.157 in) in diameter.

== Taxonomy ==
This germander was first formally described in 1883 by Ferdinand von Mueller who gave it the name Spartothamnus junceus var. puberulus in the Southern Science Record. In 1889 he elevated it to a species, Spartothamnus puberulus. In 1916, Joseph Maiden & Ernst Betche assigned it to the genus, Spartothamnella, and the plant became Spartothamnella puberula. In 2016, Stefan Kattari and Christian Bräuchler changed the name to Teucrium puberulum in the journal Taxon.

== Distribution and habitat ==
Teucrium puberulum grows in mallee and grassy woodland in inland areas between Charters Towers in Queensland and Condobolin in New South Wales.
