= Teucrium vincentinum =

Conservation status
- Least Concern (IUCN 3.1)

Scientific classification
- Kingdom: Plantae
- Clade: Tracheophytes
- Clade: Angiosperms
- Clade: Eudicots
- Clade: Asterids
- Order: Lamiales
- Family: Lamiaceae
- Genus: Teucrium
- Species: T. vincentinum

Binomial name
- Teucrium vincentinum Rouy

Synonyms
- Teucrium polium subsp. vincentinum (Rouy) D.Wood

Species of plant

Teucrium vincentinum (syn. Teucrium vicentinum) (Portuguese: pólio-vicentino) is a species of germander in the family Lamiaceae, endemic to southwestern Portugal and restricted to the Southwest Alentejo and Vicentine Coast Natural Park. It inhabits low scrubland in fixed dunes, cliffs and coastal rocks, on sandy or limestone substrates.
