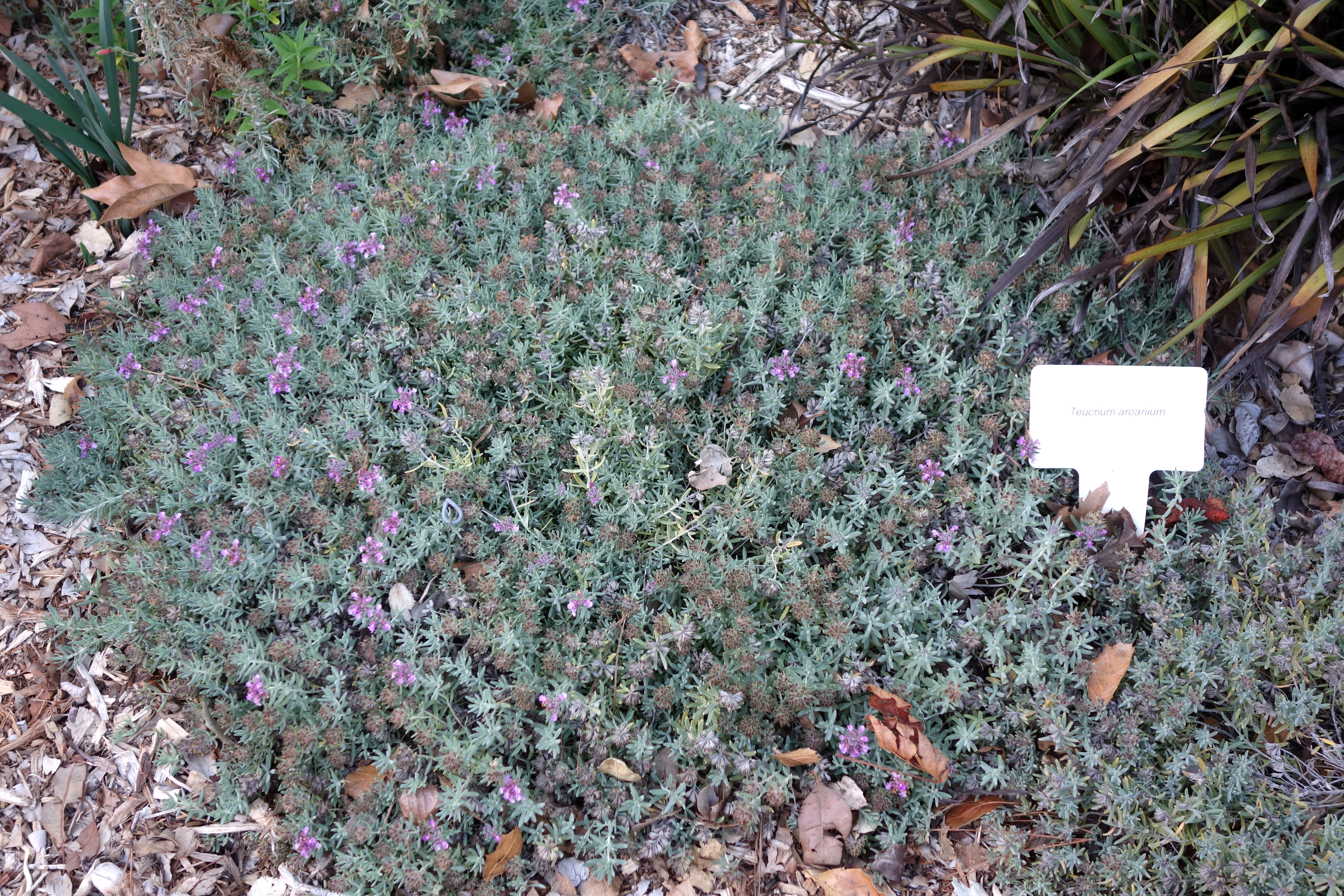

Scientific classification
- Kingdom: Plantae
- Clade: Embryophytes
- Clade: Tracheophytes
- Clade: Angiosperms
- Clade: Eudicots
- Clade: Asterids
- Order: Lamiales
- Family: Lamiaceae
- Genus: Teucrium
- Species: T. aroanium

Binomial name
- Teucrium aroanium Orph. ex Boiss.

= Teucrium aroanium =

Species of flowering plant

Teucrium aroanium is a species of flowering plant in the family Lamiaceae. It is endemic to Greece.

== Sources ==
- Diagn. Pl. Orient. II, 4: 55 1859.
- The Plant List entry
- Catalogue of Life entry
