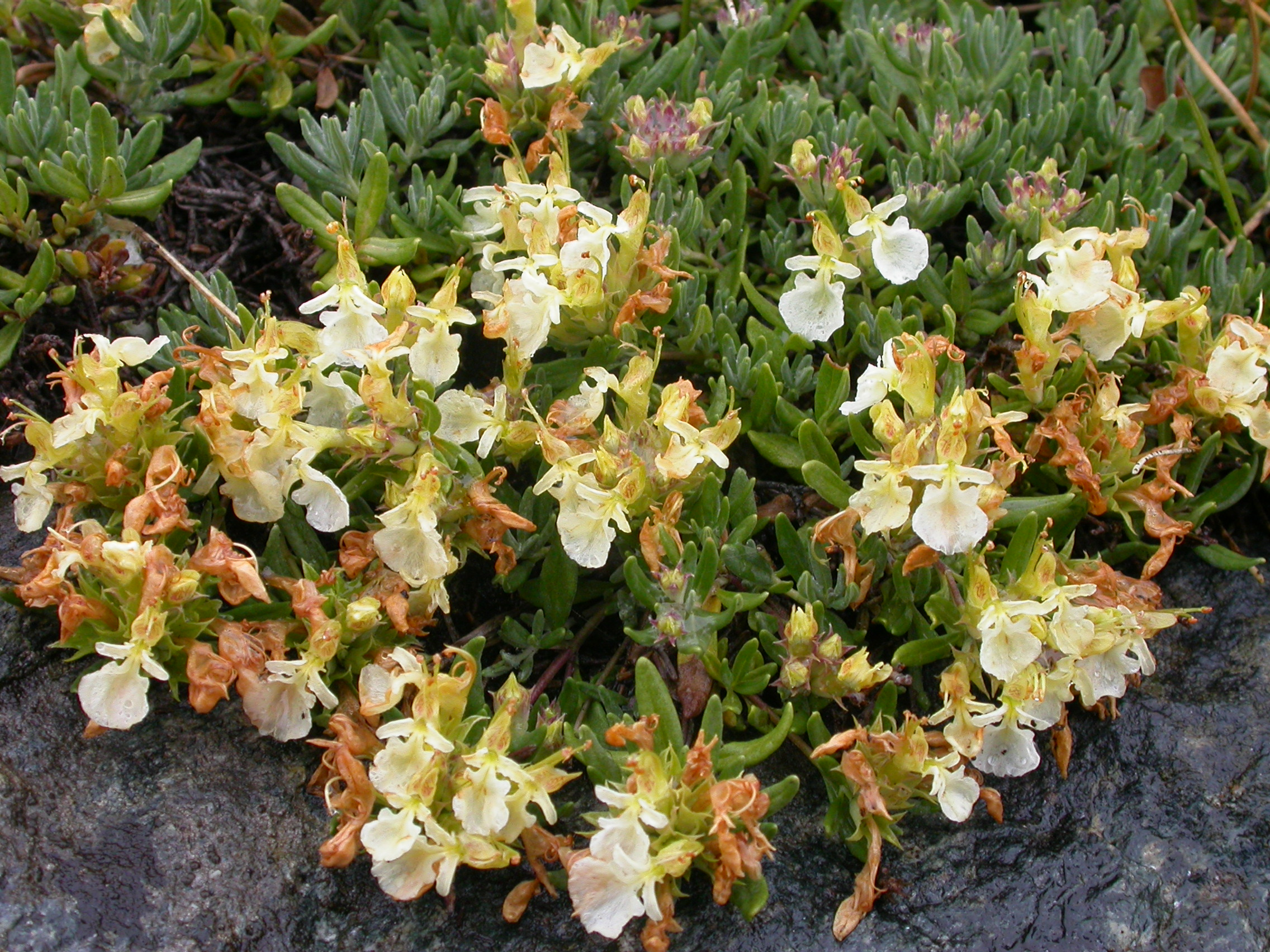

Scientific classification
- Kingdom: Plantae
- Clade: Tracheophytes
- Clade: Angiosperms
- Clade: Eudicots
- Clade: Asterids
- Order: Lamiales
- Family: Lamiaceae
- Genus: Teucrium
- Species: T. montanum

Binomial name
- Teucrium montanum L.

Synonyms
- Chamaedrys montana (L.) Raf.; Polium montanum (L.) Mill.

= Teucrium montanum =

Mountain germander

Species of shrub

Teucrium montanum, the mountain germander, is a germander native to southern Europe, from Spain eastward to Turkey. It forms shrubs about a foot high, with small leaves no more than an inch across, and petals blooming yellowish white. On south-facing mountain slopes, it can be found as far up as 2400 meters in the Alps.

The plant was known to the ancient Greeks, one of several plants named χαμαίπιτυς, as mentioned by Pliny the Elder in his Latin work Historia Naturalis.

== Taxonomy ==
Two subspecies are recognized: the nominate subspecies T. m. montanum, and T. m. helianthemoides (Adamovic) Baden.
