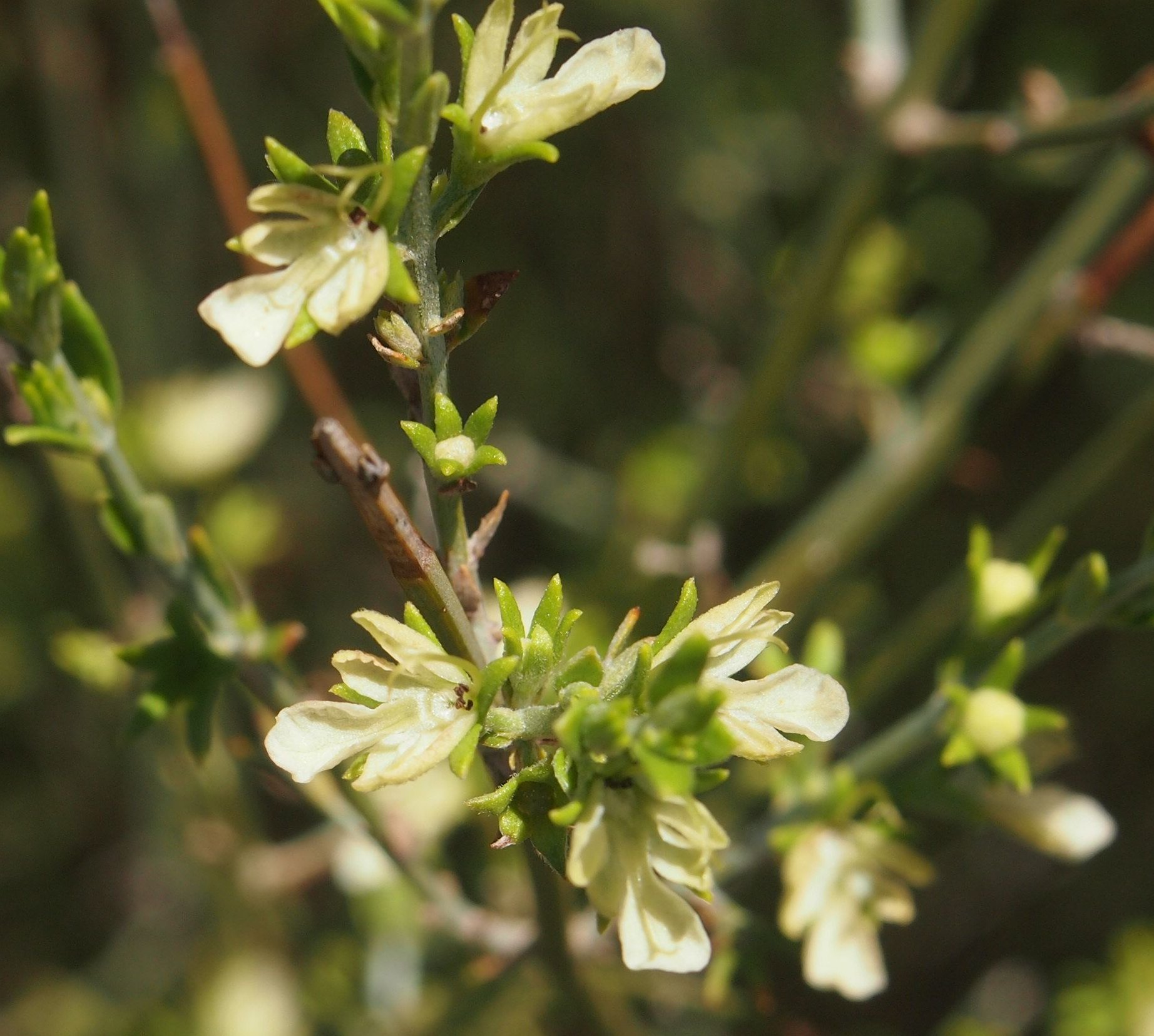

Scientific classification
- Kingdom: Plantae
- Clade: Tracheophytes
- Clade: Angiosperms
- Clade: Eudicots
- Clade: Asterids
- Order: Lamiales
- Family: Lamiaceae
- Genus: Teucrium
- Species: T. teucriiflorum

Binomial name
- Teucrium teucriiflorum (F.Muell.) Kattari & Salmaki

Synonyms
- Spartothamnella teucriiflora (F.Muell.) Moldenke; Spartothamnus teucriiflorus F.Muell.; Spartothamnus teucriifolius Domin orth. var.

= Teucrium teucriiflorum =

Species of flowering plant

Teucrium teucriiflorum is a species of flowering plant in the family Lamiaceae, and is endemic to arid and semi-arid areas of Australia. It is a semi-scandent shrub with many branches, linear to narrow lance-shaped or narrow egg-shaped leaves and creamy-white flowers.

== Description ==
Teucrium teucriiflorum is a semiscandent shrub with many branches that typically grows to a height of up to 1.5 m (4 ft 11 in), often with very few leaves. The leaves are arranged in opposite pairs, linear to narrow lance-shaped or narrow egg-shaped, 5–25 mm (0.20–0.98 in) long, 1–4 mm (0.039–0.157 in) wide and sessile. The flowers are mostly arranged singly or in groups of up to three in upper leaf axils, each flower on a pedicel 3–5 mm (0.12–0.20 in) long with leaf-like, linear to lance-shaped bracts 3–7 mm (0.12–0.28 in) long. The five sepals are 4–7 mm (0.16–0.28 in) long and joined at the base. The petals are creamy-white, 8–11 mm (0.31–0.43 in) long with five lobes, the lower middle lobe 5–7 mm (0.20–0.28 in) long. Flowering occurs in most months but mainly from August to November.

== Taxonomy ==
This germander was first formally described in 1883 by Ferdinand von Mueller who gave it the name Spartothamnus teucriiflorus in the Southern Science Record from specimens collected by Hermann Kempe near the Finke River and Ernest Giles between the Murchison and Gascoyne Rivers. In 2016, Stefan Kattari and Yasaman Salmaki changed the name to Teucrium teucriiflorum in the journal Taxon. In 2018, Anthony Bean selected the specimens collected by Kempe as the lectotype. The specific epithet (teucriiflorum), given when the species was considered to be in the genus Spartothamnus, means "Teucrium-leaved".

== Distribution and habitat ==
Teucrium teucriiflorum grows mulga-dominated, arid or semi-arid woodland and shrubland in Western Australia, southern parts of the Northern Territory and northern South Australia.
