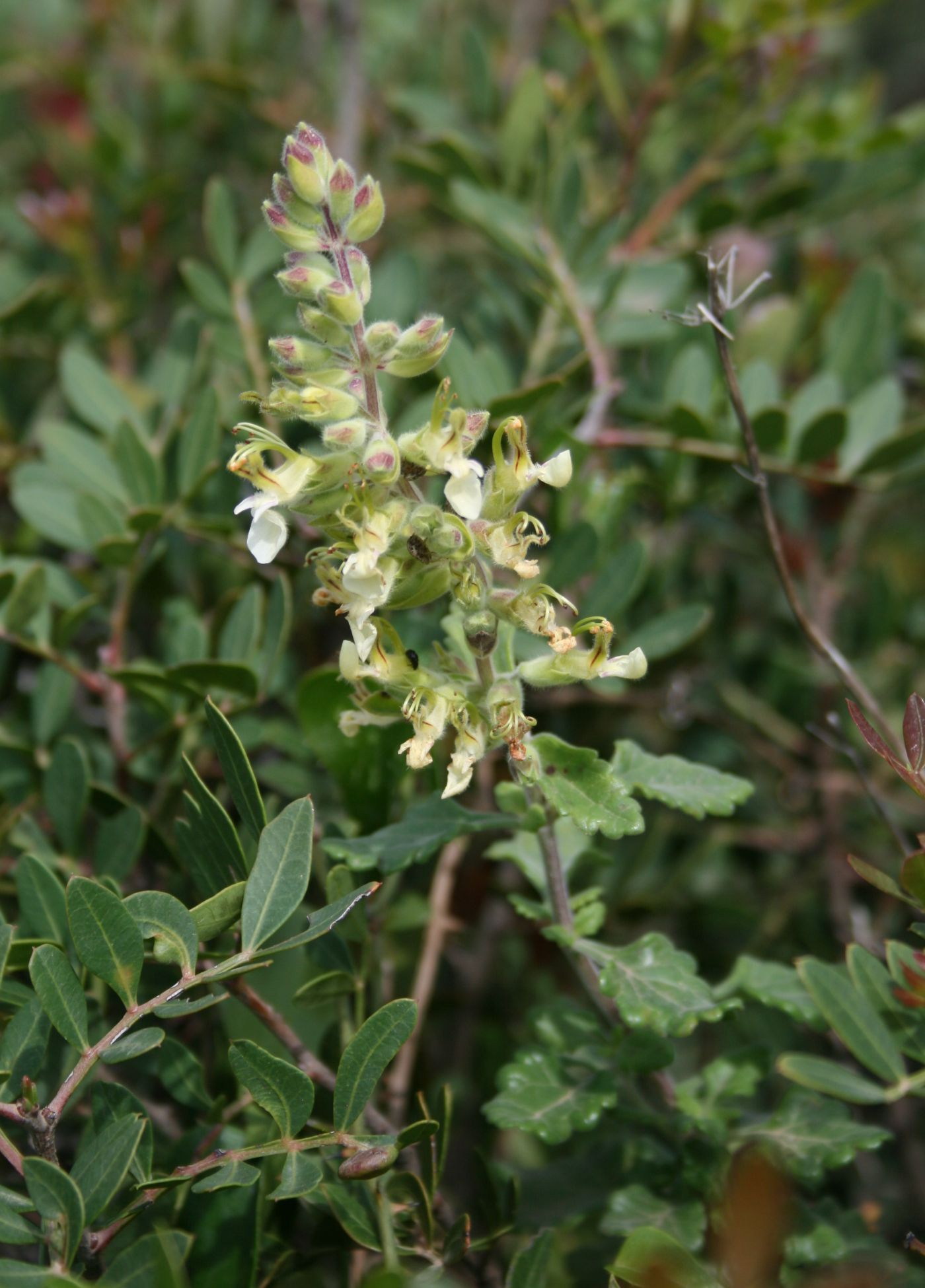

Scientific classification
- Kingdom: Plantae
- Clade: Tracheophytes
- Clade: Angiosperms
- Clade: Eudicots
- Clade: Asterids
- Order: Lamiales
- Family: Lamiaceae
- Genus: Teucrium
- Species: T. flavum

Binomial name
- Teucrium flavum L.

Subspecies
- four; see text

Synonyms
- Chamaedrys flava (L.) Moench

= Teucrium flavum =

Species of plant

Teucrium flavum is a species of subshrub in the family Lamiaceae. They have a self-supporting growth form and simple, broad leaves. Individuals can grow to 0.39 m. The species is native to Mediterranean Europe (Spain, France, Italy, former Yugoslavia, Albania, and Greece, and the Balearic Islands, Corsica, Sardinia, Sicily, and Crete), Turkey, and Morocco, Algeria, Tunisia, and Libya in North Africa.

Four subspecies are accepted.

- Teucrium flavum subsp. flavum
- Teucrium flavum subsp. glaucum (Jord. & Fourr.) Ronniger
- Teucrium flavum subsp. gymnocalyx Rech.f.
- Teucrium flavum subsp. hellenicum Rech.f.

== Sources ==
This article incorporates text from a free content work. Licensed under CC0 (license statement/permission). Text taken from Teucrium flavum. Encyclopedia of Life.
