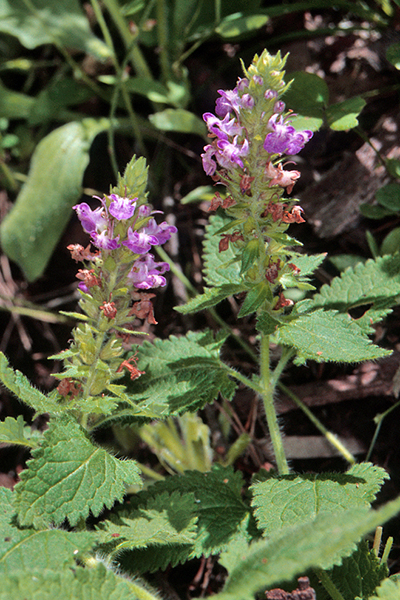
- Teucrium argutum at Carnarvon Station Reserve

Scientific classification
- Kingdom: Plantae
- Clade: Tracheophytes
- Clade: Angiosperms
- Clade: Eudicots
- Clade: Asterids
- Order: Lamiales
- Family: Lamiaceae
- Genus: Teucrium
- Species: T. argutum

Binomial name
- Teucrium argutum R.Br.

Synonyms
- Teucrium argutum R.Br. var. argutum

= Teucrium argutum =

Native germander

Species of flowering plant

Teucrium argutum, commonly known as native germander, is a species of flowering plant in the family Lamiaceae, and is endemic to eastern Australia. It is a perennial herb often suckering, with hairy, broadly egg-shaped leaves with toothed or wavy edges, and pink-purple flowers.

== Description ==
Teucrium argutum is a perennial herb that typically grows to a height of 50 cm (20 in), often suckering and scrambling, with densely hairy branches that are square in cross-section. The leaves are arranged in opposite pairs, broadly egg-shaped to triangular, 15–50 mm (0.59–1.97 in) long and 12–20 mm (0.47–0.79 in) wide on a petiole 3–18 mm (0.12–0.71 in) long. The leaves are hairy and have toothed or wavy edges. The flowers are arranged singly at the base of leaf-like bracts on a pedicel up to 2 mm (0.079 in) long. The five sepals are 4–7 mm (0.16–0.28 in) long, joined at the base for about half their length, and densely covered with stalked and sessile glands. The petals are pink-purple and 8–10 mm (0.31–0.39 in) long. Flowering occurs from December to June.

== Taxonomy ==
Teucrium argutum was first formally described in 1810 by Robert Brown in his Prodromus Florae Novae Hollandiae et Insulae Van Diemen. In 2018, Anthony Bean selected the specimens collected near the Hawkesbury River as the lectotype.

== Distribution and habitat ==
Native germander grows in forest and woodland from near Lakeland on Cape York Peninsula in Queensland, south to near Sydney.
