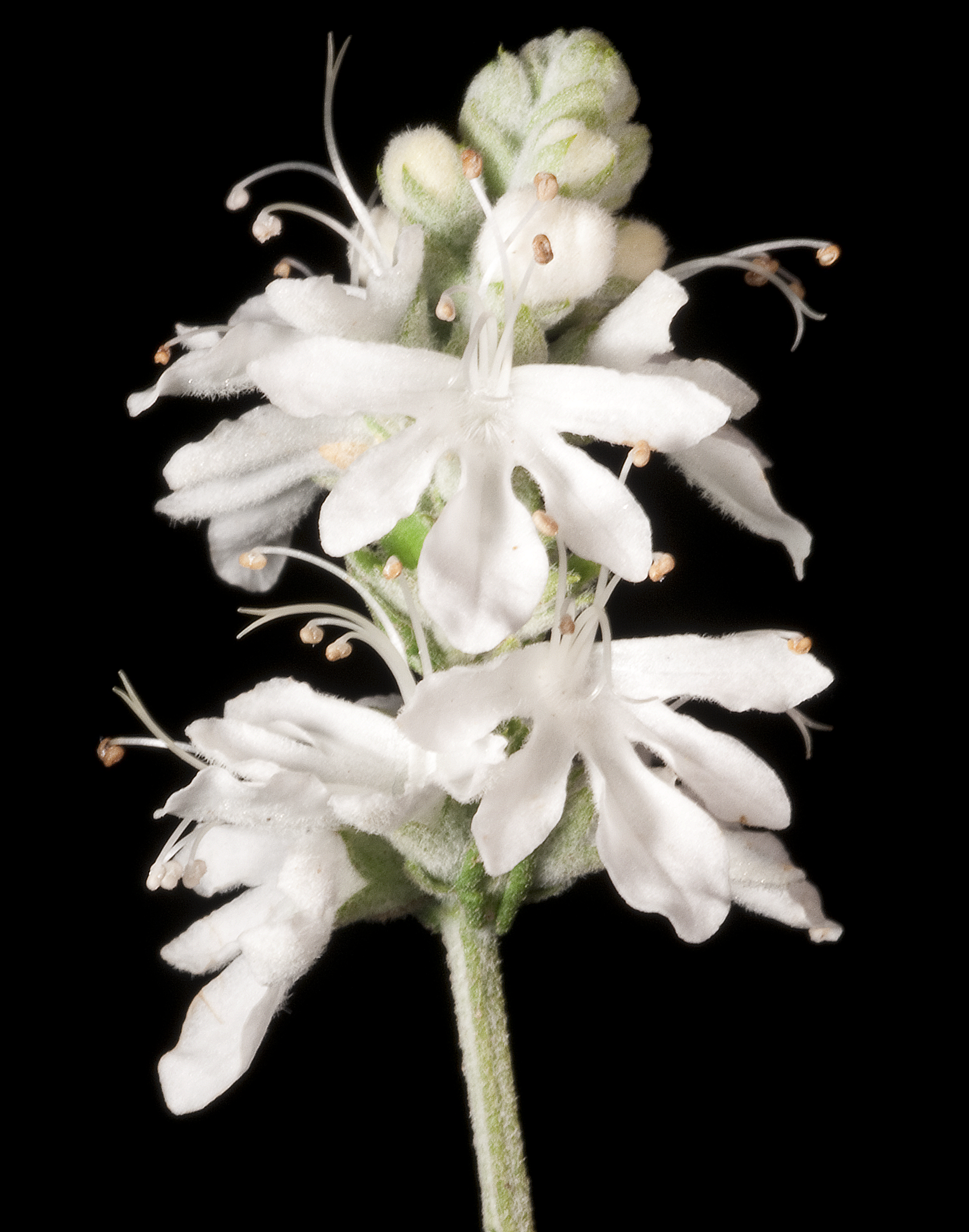

Scientific classification
- Kingdom: Plantae
- Clade: Tracheophytes
- Clade: Angiosperms
- Clade: Eudicots
- Clade: Asterids
- Order: Lamiales
- Family: Lamiaceae
- Genus: Teucrium
- Species: T. eremaeum

Binomial name
- Teucrium eremaeum Diels

= Teucrium eremaeum =

Species of flowering plant

Teucrium eremaeum is a species of flowering plant in the family Lamiaceae and is endemic to the south-west of Western Australia. It is a perennial herb or shrub with small, linear to lance-shaped leaves and white or cream-coloured flowers.

== Description ==
Teucrium eremaeum is a perennial herb or shrub that typically grows to a height of up to 20–45 cm (7.9–17.7 in) with stems that are square in cross-section. The leaves are arranged in opposite pairs, linear to lance-shaped, 3–8 mm (0.12–0.31 in) long and 1–2 mm (0.039–0.079 in) wide and covered with glandular hairs. The flowers are borne in leaf axils with bracteoles 2–3 mm (0.079–0.118 in) long, the sepals 1.5–2.5 mm (0.059–0.098 in) long and joined at the base. The petals are white or cream-coloured, 7.8–9.5 mm (0.31–0.37 in) long with four stamens. Flowering occurs from September to November.

== Taxonomy ==
Teucrium eremaeum was formally described in 1904 by Ludwig Diels in Botanische Jahrbücher für Systematik, Pflanzengeschichte und Pflanzengeographie. The specific epithet (eremaeum) means "lonely or solitary", referring to the habitat of this species.

== Distribution and habitat ==
This germander grows on the edges of salt lakes and in disturbed areas in the Coolgardie and Mallee biogeographic regions in the south-west of Western Australia.

== Conservation status ==
Teucrium eremaeum is classified as "not threatened" by the Western Australian Government Department of Parks and Wildlife.
