= Teucrium socotranum =

Conservation status
- Least Concern (IUCN 3.1)

Scientific classification
- Kingdom: Plantae
- Clade: Tracheophytes
- Clade: Angiosperms
- Clade: Eudicots
- Clade: Asterids
- Order: Lamiales
- Family: Lamiaceae
- Genus: Teucrium
- Species: T. socotranum

Binomial name
- Teucrium socotranum Vierh.

Species of flowering plant

Teucrium socotranum is a species of flowering plant in the family Lamiaceae. It is found only in the Socotra Islands, part of the nation of Yemen. Its natural habitat is rocky areas.
