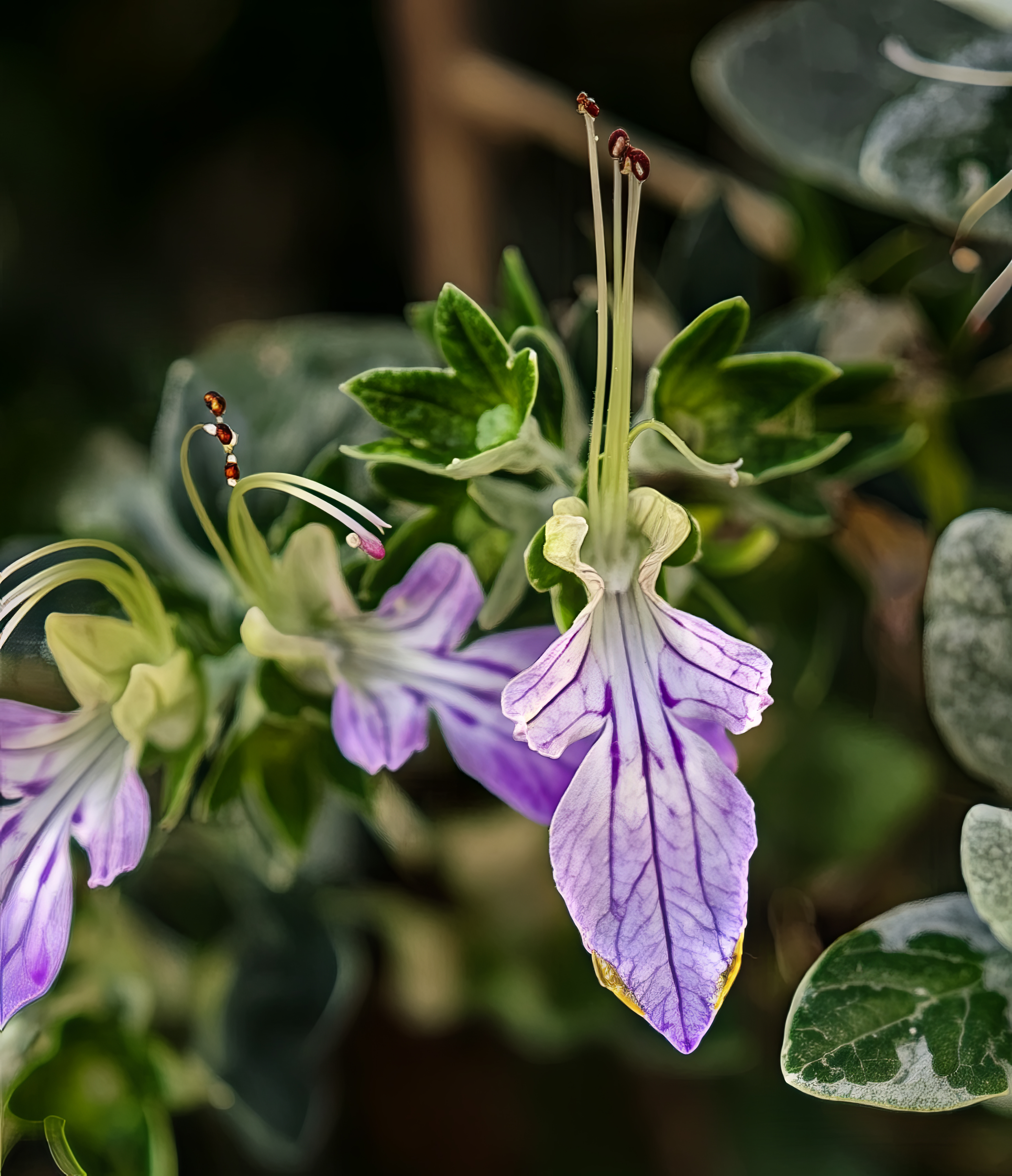

Scientific classification
- Kingdom: Plantae
- Clade: Tracheophytes
- Clade: Angiosperms
- Clade: Eudicots
- Clade: Asterids
- Order: Lamiales
- Family: Lamiaceae
- Genus: Teucrium
- Species: T. fruticans

Binomial name
- Teucrium fruticans L.

= Teucrium fruticans =

Species of flowering plant

Teucrium fruticans (common name tree germander or shrubby germander) is a species of flowering plant in the mint family Lamiaceae, native to the western and central Mediterranean. Growing to 1 m (3 ft) tall by 4 m (13 ft) wide, it is a spreading evergreen shrub with arching velvety white shoots, glossy aromatic leaves and pale blue flowers in summer.

The Latin specific epithet fruticans means "shrubby" or "bushy".

The cultivar 'Azureum', with darker blue flowers, has gained the Royal Horticultural Society's Award of Garden Merit. It is hardy in milder areas, where temperatures do not fall below −5 °C (23 °F). It prefers the shelter of a wall, in full sun with neutral or alkaline soil.
