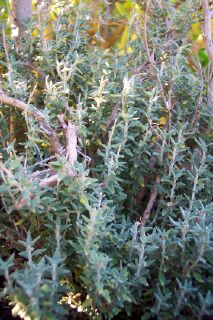

Scientific classification
- Kingdom: Plantae
- Clade: Tracheophytes
- Clade: Angiosperms
- Clade: Eudicots
- Clade: Asterids
- Order: Lamiales
- Family: Lamiaceae
- Genus: Teucrium
- Species: T. marum

Binomial name
- Teucrium marum L.

= Teucrium marum =

Species of flowering plant

Teucrium marum, commonly known as cat thyme or kitty crack, is a species of germander. Its small, oval leaves give it a thyme-like appearance, but the musty scent is quite unlike the delicate aroma of thyme. Cat thyme is a mounding, tender perennial with grey-green leaves tipped by fragrant pink flowers in summer.

Teucrium marum is native to the Western Mediterranean.

== Description ==
Teucrium marum has oval leaves, broader at the base, downy beneath, with uncut margins. It is in leaf all year. The flowers, appearing between July and September in the northern hemisphere, are in one-sided spikes, and the corollas are crimson in color. The leaves and younger branches when fresh, on being rubbed emit a volatile, pungent, aromatic smell, which excites sneezing, but in taste they are somewhat bitter, accompanied by a sensation of heat.

Teucrium marum will live through the winter in the open, on dry soil and in a good situation, when the frosts are not severe, though it is frequently killed in hard winters if unprotected by mats or other covering. Older plants can grow 3 or 4 feet high if grown in a mild climate.

Teucrium marum has a similar effect on cats to catnip.

== Taxonomy ==
Teucrium mare is part of a complex of three subspecies :

- T. marum subsp. marum
- T. marum subsp. occidentale
- T. marum subsp. drosocalyx

Quantitative and qualitative differences in the volatile components within and between taxa have been found.
