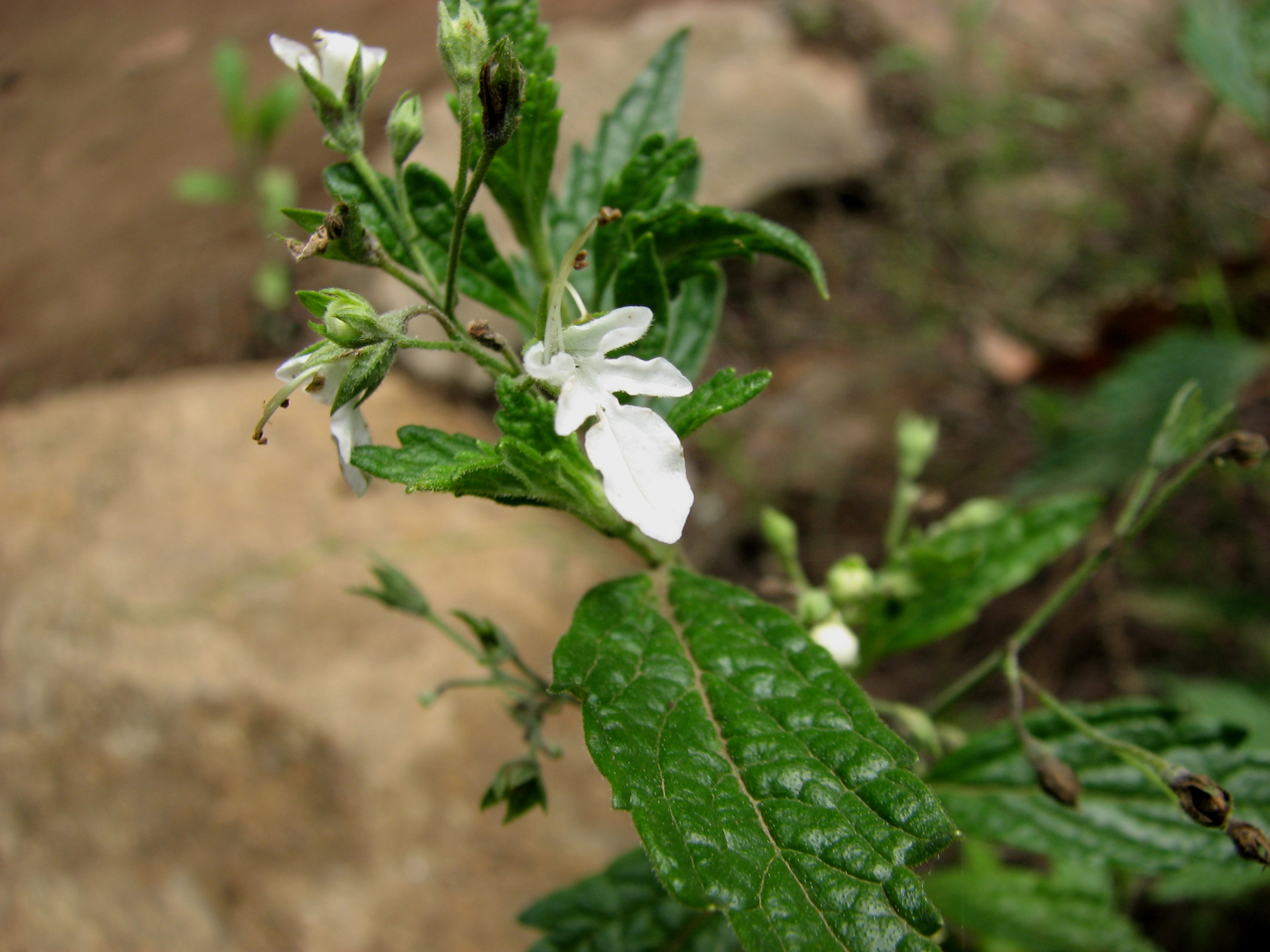
- Teucrium corymbosum at Marysville

Scientific classification
- Kingdom: Plantae
- Clade: Tracheophytes
- Clade: Angiosperms
- Clade: Eudicots
- Clade: Asterids
- Order: Lamiales
- Family: Lamiaceae
- Genus: Teucrium
- Species: T. corymbosum

Binomial name
- Teucrium corymbosum R.Br.

Synonyms
- Anisomeles australis Spreng.; Scoparia australis Sieber ex Schult. & Schult.f.; Teucrium australe Spreng. nom. inval., pro syn.; Teucrium corymbosum R.Br. var. corymbosum; Teucrium corymbosum var. typicum Domin nom. inval.

= Teucrium corymbosum =

Forest germander

Species of flowering plant

Teucrium corymbosum, commonly known as forest germander, is a species of flowering plant in the family Lamiaceae and is native to Australia and New Guinea. It is a perennial herb or subshrub densely covered with glands and with narrow egg-shaped leaves usually with toothed edges, and groups of mostly up to ten white flowers.

== Description ==
Teucrium corymbosum is a perennial herb or subshrub that typically grows to a height of up to 1.5 m (4 ft 11 in). Its stems are square in cross-section and densely covered with greyish hairs and sessile glands. The leaves are narrow egg-shaped to lance-shaped, 20–110 mm (0.79–4.33 in) long and 6–20 mm (0.24–0.79 in) wide on a petiole up to 14 mm (0.55 in) long. The edges of the leaves are toothed, (except in the Warrumbungles form) and the lower surface is hairy. The flowers are borne in clusters of between five and ten in leaf axils, each flower on a pedicel 3–10 mm (0.12–0.39 in) long. The sepals are 3–5 mm (0.12–0.20 in) long, joined at their lower half, with sessile glands and hairs on the outside. The petals are white, 8–12 mm (0.31–0.47 in) long, the lowest lobe 8–9 mm (0.31–0.35 in) long. Flowering occurs from August to April and the fruit is a schizocarp about 3 mm (0.12 in) long.

== Taxonomy ==
Teucrium corymbosum was formally described in 1810 by botanist Robert Brown in Prodromus Florae Novae Hollandiae.

== Distribution and habitat ==
Forest germander grows in forest, dry creek beds, shaded and partially cleared areas, often on rocky ground. It occurs in New Guinea, Queensland, eastern New South Wales, Victoria and Tasmania, and in south-eastern South Australia.

== Conservation status ==
The species is listed as rare in Tasmania under the Threatened Species Protection Act 1995.
