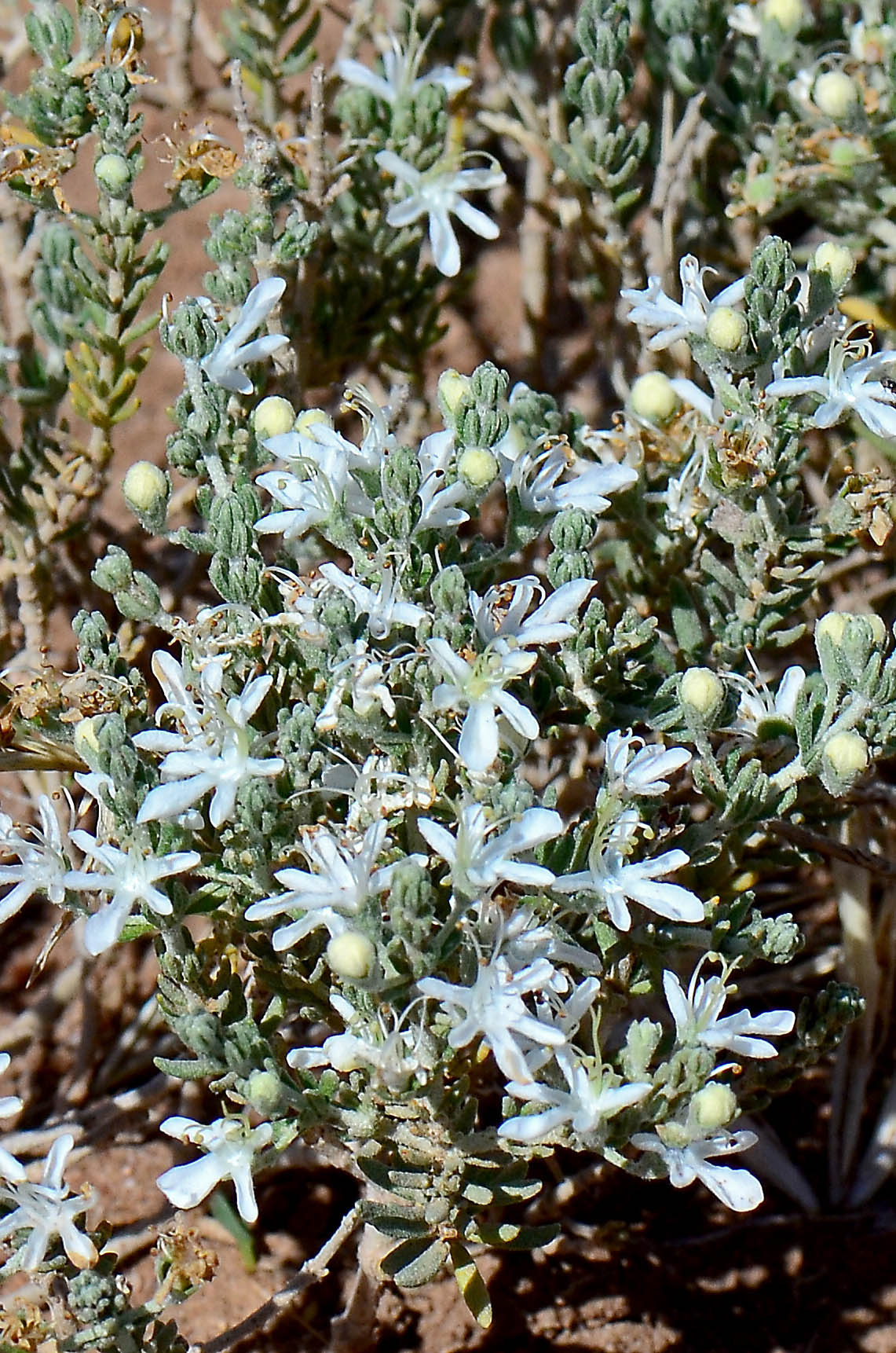
- Teucrium albicaule near Dimboola

Scientific classification
- Kingdom: Plantae
- Clade: Tracheophytes
- Clade: Angiosperms
- Clade: Eudicots
- Clade: Asterids
- Order: Lamiales
- Family: Lamiaceae
- Genus: Teucrium
- Species: T. albicaule

Binomial name
- Teucrium albicaule Toelken

= Teucrium albicaule =

Scurfy germander

Species of flowering plant

Teucrium albicaule, commonly known as scurfy germander, is a species of flowering plant in the family Lamiaceae, and is endemic to inland areas of Australia. It is a hoary, perennial herb that spreads by root suckers, forming dense stands. The leaves are trifoliate and the white flowers are arranged singly in leaf axils.

== Description ==
Teucrium albicaule is a perennial herb that typically grows to a height of 5–20 cm (2.0–7.9 in) and spreads by root suckers forming dense stands up to several metres wide. Its branches are white or greyish, square in cross-section and densely hairy. The leaves are arranged in opposite pairs, sessile and trifoliate, sometimes appearing to be arranged in whorls of six leaves. The leaflets are more or less linear, 2–10 mm (0.079–0.394 in) long and 1–2 mm (0.039–0.079 in) wide with the edges curved downwards. The lowest leaves are sometimes narrow elliptic and up to 14 mm (0.55 in) long. The flowers are arranged singly in leaf axils on a pedicel 4–7 mm (0.16–0.28 in) long. The five sepals are 2–5 mm (0.079–0.197 in) long, joined at the base for about half their length, and densely covered with grey hairs. The petals are white with the lower middle lobe 5–8 mm (0.20–0.31 in) long and the four stamens are about 6–8 mm (0.24–0.31 in) long. Flowering occurs from September to June.

== Taxonomy ==
Teucrium albicaule was first formally described in 1985 by Hellmut R. Toelken in the Journal of the Adelaide Botanic Gardens from specimens collected by William Robert Barker and Robert Chinnock on the Strzelecki Track, near the Queensland-New South Wales border.

== Distribution and habitat ==
Scurfy germander grows in depressions in woodland and shrubland and occurs in arid areas of north-eastern South Australia, south-eastern Northern Territory, north-western Victoria and New South Wales, south and west of Bancannia Lake.
