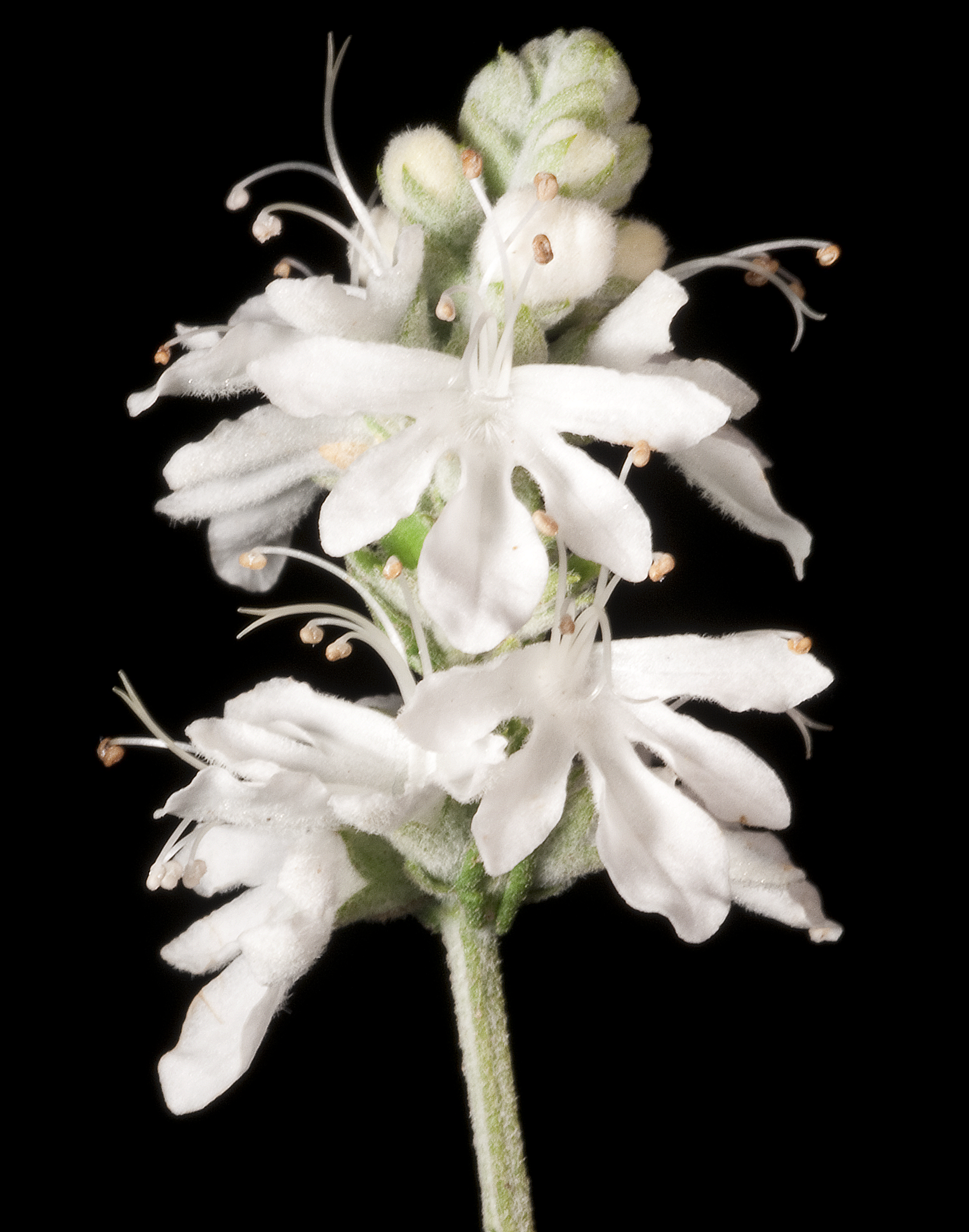
- Teucrium eremaeum

Scientific classification
- Kingdom: Plantae
- Clade: Tracheophytes
- Clade: Angiosperms
- Clade: Eudicots
- Clade: Asterids
- Order: Lamiales
- Family: Lamiaceae
- Subfamily: Ajugoideae
- Genus: Teucrium; L. (1753)

Type species
- Teucrium fruticans L.

Species
- See List of Teucrium species

Synonyms
- List: Botrys Fourr.; Chamaedrys Mill.; Iva Fabr. nom. illeg.; Kinostemon Kudô; Melosmon Raf.; Monipsis Raf.; Monochilon Dulac; Oncinocalyx F.Muell.; Poliodendron Webb & Berthel.; Polium Mill.; Scorbion Raf.; Scordium Mill.; Scorodonia Hill; Spartothamnella Briq.; Spartothamnus A.Cunn. ex Walp.; Teucridium Hook.f.; Trixago Raf.

= Teucrium =

Germanders

Genus of flowering plants

Teucrium is a cosmopolitan genus of flowering plants in the mint family Lamiaceae, commonly known as germanders. Plants in this genus are perennial herbs or shrubs, with branches that are more or less square in cross-section, leaves arranged in opposite pairs, and flowers arranged in thyrses, the corolla with mostly white to cream-coloured, lobed petals.

== Description ==
Plants in the genus Teucrium are perennial herbs or shrubs with four-cornered stems, often with simple hairs and sessile glands. The leaves are arranged in opposite pairs, simple or with three leaflets sometimes with lobed or serrated edges. The flowers are arranged in a thyrse, sometimes in a cyme in leaf axils. The flowers have five more or less similar sepals fused at the base, and the corolla is white or cream-coloured with five lobes forming two lips. The upper lip is usually much reduced in size and the lower lip has three lobes, the central lobe usually larger than the side lobes. There are four stamens attached near the base of the petals and the fruit is a schizocarp with four segments.

== Taxonomy ==
The genus Teucrium was first formally described in 1753 by Carl Linnaeus in Species Plantarum. The name Teucrium was used by Pedanius Dioscorides for several species in this genus, and is believed to refer to King Teucer of Troy who used the plant in his medicine.

== Species ==
(See List of Teucrium species)

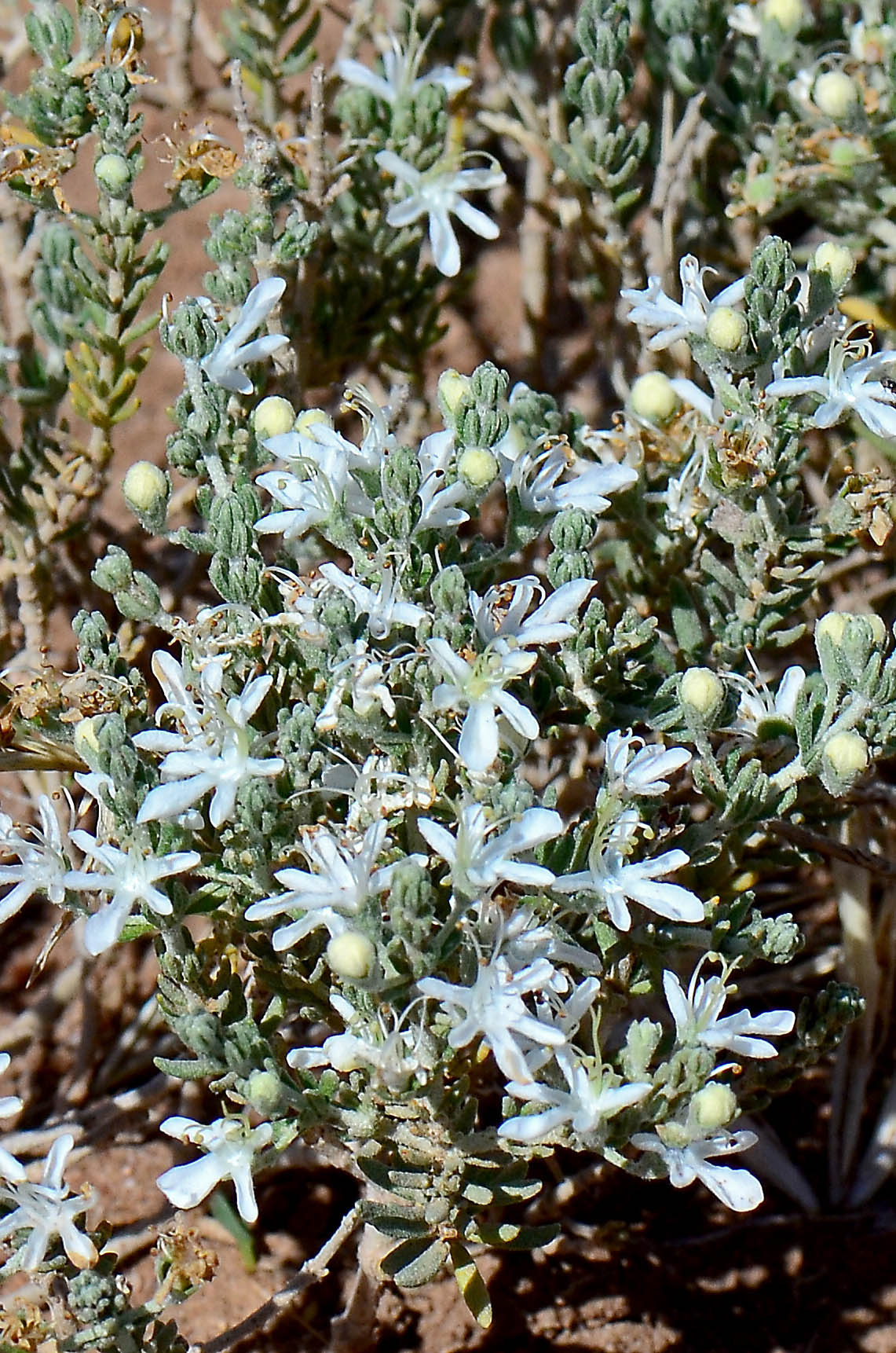
Scurfy germander (T. albicaule)

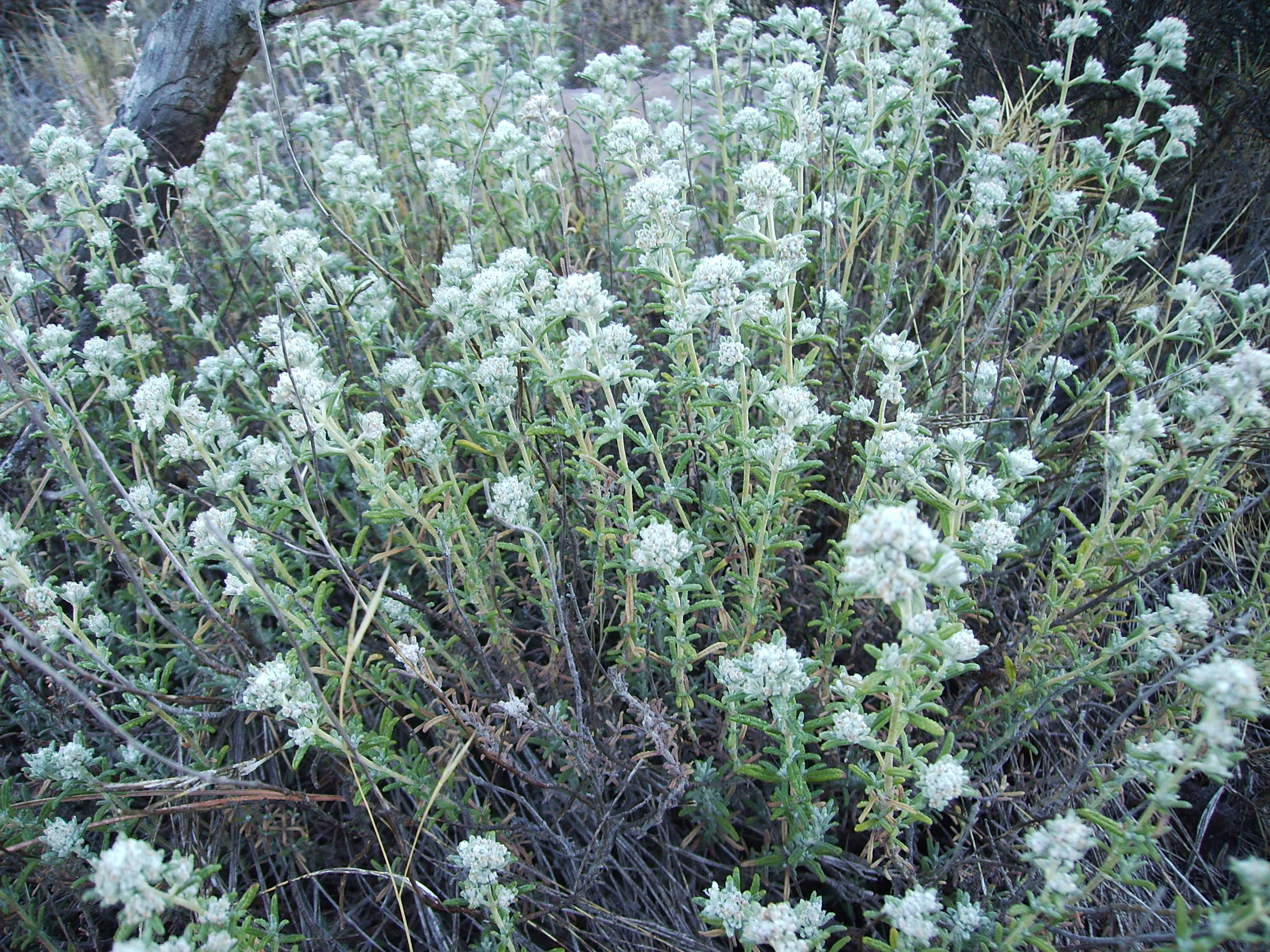
Teucrium capitatum

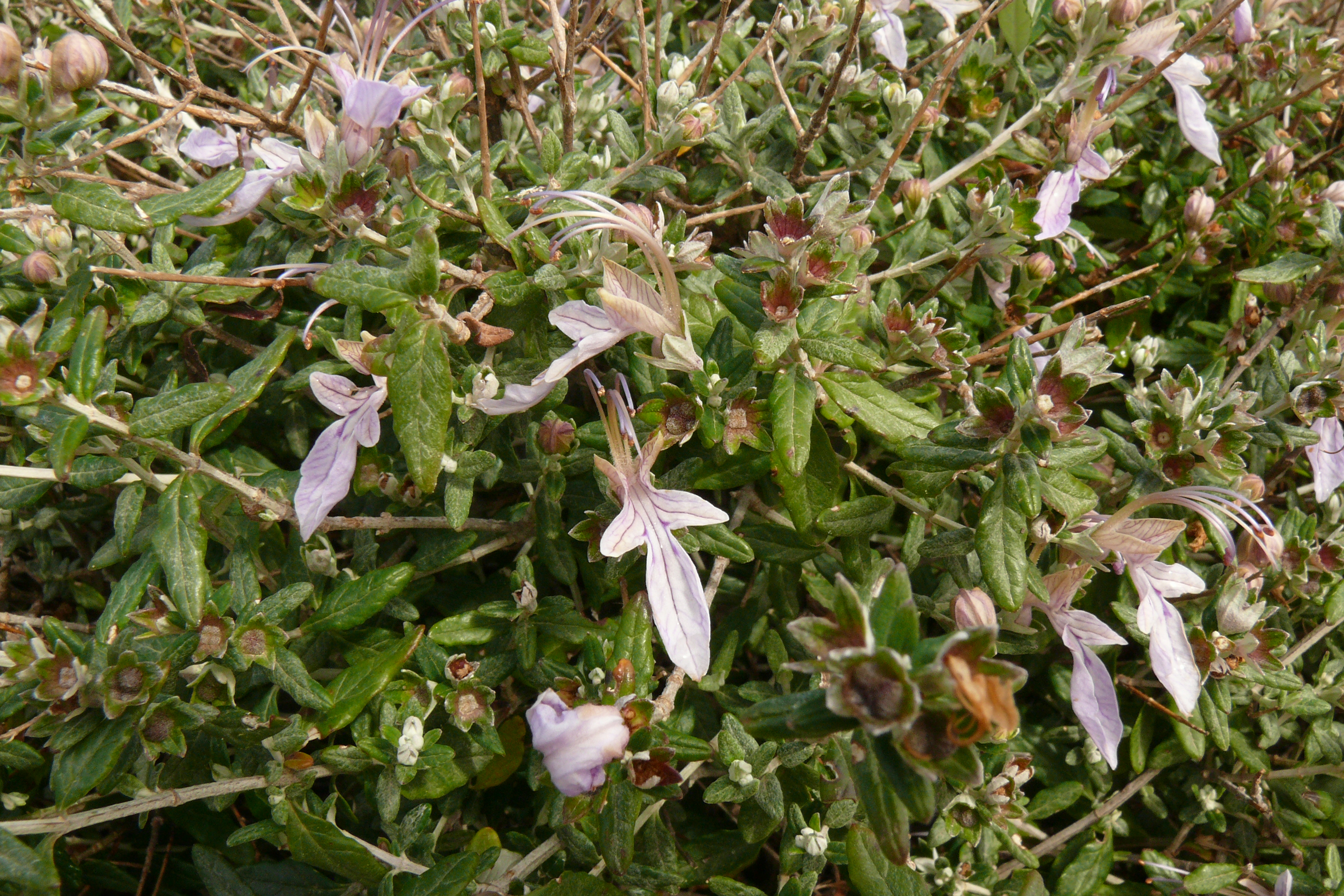
Tree germander (T. fruticans)

Teucrium is a cosmopolitan genus with about 300 species, the distribution centred on the Mediterranean. There are about thirteen species endemic to Australia.

== Fossil record ==
†Teucrium tatjanae seed fossils are known from the Oligocene, Miocene and Pliocene of western Siberia, Miocene and Pliocene of central and southern Russia and Miocene of Lusatia. The fossil seeds are similar to seeds of the extant Teucrium orientale. †Teucrium pripiatense seed fossils have been described from the Pliocene Borsoni Formation in the Rhön Mountains of central Germany.
