= List of endemic plants of the Balearic Islands =

The Balearic Islands is an archipelago in the western Mediterranean Sea, which includes three large islands – Mallorca, Menorca, and Ibiza – and several smaller ones. The islands are home to dozens of endemic species and subspecies of plants, and endemic genera Femeniasia, Naufraga, and Spiroceratium. Although it is politically part of Spain, the World Geographical Scheme for Recording Plant Distributions treats the Balearic Islands as distinct botanical region.

Plants are listed alphabetically by plant family. Extinct and presumed extinct species are indicated with †.

== Amaranthaceae ==
- Atriplex tornabenei subsp. pedunculata (Castrov.) Iamonico

== Amaryllidaceae ==
- Allium grosii Font Quer – Ibiza

== Apiaceae ==
- Bunium balearicum (Sennen) Mateo & López Udias
- Bupleurum barceloi Coss. ex Willk. – Mallorca
- Daucus carota subsp. majoricus A.Pujadas
- Helosciadium bermejoi (L.Llorens) Popper & M.F.Watson – eastern Menorca
- Laserpitium gallicum subsp. majoricum Romo
- Ligusticum lucidum subsp. huteri (Porta) O.Bolòs – Mallorca
- Magydaris pastinacea subsp. femeniesii O.Bolòs & Vigo
- Naufraga Constance & Cannon
  - Naufraga balearica Constance & Cannon Mallorca: near Pollensa
- Pastinaca lucida L.
- Spiroceratium H.Wolff
  - Spiroceratium bicknellii (Briq.) H.Wolff – Mallorca
- Thapsia gymnesica Rosselló & A.Pujadas

== Aristolochiaceae ==
- Aristolochia bianorii Sennen & Pau – Mallorca, Minorca

== Asparagaceae ==
- Brimeura duvigneaudii (L.Llorens) Rosselló, Mus & Mayol – northern Mallorca
  - Brimeura duvigneaudii subsp. duvigneaudii – N. Mallorca
  - Brimeura duvigneaudii subsp. occultata L.Sáez, Rita, Bibiloni, Roquet & López-Alvarado – Mallorca: Sierra de Tramontana

== Aspleniaceae ==
- Asplenium × artanense Rosselló, Cubas, Gradaille & B.Sastre (A. sagittatum × A. trichomanes subsp. inexpectans)
- Asplenium × barrancense (Bennert & D.E.Mey.) Pericás & Rosselló (A. ceterach × A. majoricum)
- Asplenium × orellii Lovis & Reichst. (A. majoricum × A. trichomanes subsp. quadrivalens)
- Asplenium × rosselloi Bennert, Rasbach & Reichst. (A. balearicum × A. onopteris)
- Asplenium trichomanes nothosubsp. barreraense Rasbach, K.Rasbach, Reichst. & Bennert (A. trichomanes subsp. coriaceifolium × A. trichomanes subsp. quadrivalvens)
- Asplenium trichomanes nothosubsp. lucanum Cubas, Rosselló & Pangua (A. trichomanes subsp. inexpectans × A. trichomanes subsp. quadrivalens)
- Asplenium × tubalense Rosselló, Cubas & Rebassa (A. azomanes × A. trichomanes subsp. quadrivalens)

== Asteraceae ==
- Bellium artrutxense P.Fraga & Rosselló
- Carduus ibicensis (Devesa & Talavera) Rosselló & N.Torres
- Cheirolophus grandifolius (Font Quer) Stübing, Peris, Olivares & J.Martín
- Crepis triasii (Cambess.) Nyman – Mallorca, Menorca
- Femeniasia Susanna
  - Femeniasia balearica (J.J.Rodr.) Susanna – Menorca
- Filago petro-ianii Rita & Dittrich – central and southwestern Mallorca
- Helichrysum × ambiguum (Pers.) C.Presl (H. crassifolium × H. stoechas)
- Helichrysum crassifolium (L.) D.Don ex G.Don in J.C.Loudon – Mallorca, Menorca, Dragonera
- Helichrysum massanellanum Herrando, J.M.Blanco, L.Sáez & Galbany – Mallorca
- Hieracium balearicum Arv.-Touv. – Mallorca
- Hieracium majorcanum Arv.-Touv. – Mallorca
- Launaea cervicornis (Boiss.) Font Quer & Rothm. – Mallorca, Menorca
- Mauranthemum paludosum subsp. ebusitanum (Vogt) Vogt & Oberpr. – Ibiza
- Santolina magonica (O.Bolòs, Molin. & P.Monts.) Romo – Mallorca, Menorca
- Santolina vedranensis (O.Bolòs & Vigo) L.Sáez, M.Serrano, S.Ortiz & R.Carbajal – Islote de es Vedrá
- Senecio varicosus L.f. – Mallorca, Menorca
- Sonchus bulbosus subsp. willkomii (Burnat & Barbey) N.Kilian & Greuter

== Boraginaceae ==
- Myosotis arvensis var. garciasii O.Bolòs & Vigo

== Brassicaceae ==
- Biscutella ebusitana Rosselló & L.Sáez
- Brassica balearica Pers. – Mallorca: Sierra de la Tramontana

== Campanulaceae ==
- Solenopsis minima (Sims) M.B.Crespo, Serra & Juan – Mallorca

== Caprifoliaceae ==
- Cephalaria squamiflora subsp. balearica (Coss. ex Willk.) Greuter
- Lonicera pyrenaica subsp. majoricensis (Gand.) Gand.

== Caryophyllaceae ==
- Arenaria grandiflora subsp. pseudoincrassata Malag.
- Cerastium brachypetalum subsp. balearicum Romo
- Dianthus rupicola subsp. bocchoriana L.Llorens & Gradaille – Mallorca
- Polycarpon polycarpoides subsp. colomense (Porta) Pedrol
- Polycarpon tetraphyllum subsp. dunense (P.Fraga & Rosselló) Iamonico – N. Menorca
- Silene mollissima (L.) Pers.

== Cistaceae ==
- Helianthemum scopulicola L.Sáez, Rosselló & Alomar – Mallorca

== Cyperaceae ==
- Carex rorulenta Porta

== Cytinaceae ==
- Cytinus hypocistis subsp. pityusensis Finschow – Ibiza. Parasitic on Cistus clusii.

== Euphorbiaceae ==
- Euphorbia fontqueriana Greuter – Mallorca
- Euphorbia maresii Knoche
  - Euphorbia maresii subsp. balearica (Willk.) Malag. – Mallorca
  - Euphorbia maresii subsp. maresii
- Euphorbia margalidiana Kuhbier & Lewej.
- Euphorbia nurae P.Fraga & Rosselló

== Fabaceae ==
- Anthyllis hystrix (Willk. ex Barceló) Cardona, J.Cont. & E.Sierra – Minorca
- Anthyllis vulneraria subsp. balearica (Coss. ex Marès & Vigin.) O.Bolòs & Vigo
- Astragalus balearicus Chater
- Coronilla montserratii P.Fraga & Rosselló
- Genista balearica Willk. ex Porta
- Genista dorycnifolia Font Quer – Ibiza
- Genista majorica Cantó & M.J.Sánchez
- Hippocrepis balearica Jacq.
- Hippocrepis grosii (Pau) Boira, Gil & L.Llorens – Ibiza
- Lotus fulgurans (Porta) D.D.Sokoloff – Mallorca, Menorca
- Lotus × minoricensis M.À.Conesa, Mus & Rosselló (L. fulgurans × L. dorycnium)
- Lotus tetraphyllus L.
- Vicia bifoliolata J.J.Rodr. – Menorca

== Gentianaceae ==
- Centaurium bianoris (Sennen) Sennen
- Centaurium erythraea subsp. enclusense (O.Bolòs, Molin. & P.Monts.) O.Bolòs & Vigo – Menorca

== Geraniaceae ==
- Erodium reichardii (Murray) DC.

== Hypericaceae ==
- Hypericum balearicum L.
- Hypericum hircinum subsp. cambessedesii (Coss. ex Barceló) Sauvage – Mallorca

== Iridaceae ==
- Crocus cambessedesii J.Gay – Mallorca and Minorca

== Lamiaceae ==
- Clinopodium rouyanum (Briq.) Govaerts – Mallorca
- Micromeria filiformis subsp. filiformis
- Phlomis italica L.
- Scutellaria balearica Barceló – N. Mallorca
- Teucrium asiaticum L.
- Teucrium balearicum (Coss. ex Pau) Castrov. & Bayon
- Teucrium capitatum subsp. majoricum (Rouy) Nyman
- Teucrium cossonii D.Wood
- Teucrium subspinosum Pourr. ex Willd. – Mallorca, Cabrera
- Thymus bivalens (Mayol, L.Sáez & Rosselló) Camarda – Mallorca
- Thymus richardii subsp. ebusitanus {{small|(Font Quer) Jalas – Ibiza
- Thymus richardii subsp. richardii – Mallorca

== Malvaceae ==
- Malva lusitanica subsp. minoricensis (Cambess.) Valdés – Menorca

== Orchidaceae ==
- Anacamptis × timbali nothosubsp. albuferensis (R.M.Bateman) H.Kretzschmar, Eccarius & H.Dietr. (A. coriophora × A. palustris subsp. robusta)
- Ophrys × soller M.Henkel (O. apifera × O. speculum)

== Orobanchaceae ==
- Orobanche iammonensis A.Pujadas & P.Fraga – Menorca

== Paeoniaceae ==
- Paeonia cambessedesii (Willk.) Willk.

== Plantaginaceae ==
- Chaenorhinum origanifolium subsp. rodriguezii (Porta) Güemes
- Chaenorhinum rubrifolium subsp. formenterae (Gand.) R.Fern. – Formentera
- Cymbalaria fragilis (J.J.Rodr.) A.Chev. – Menorca
- Digitalis minor L.
  - Digitalis minor var. minor
  - Digitalis minor var. palaui (Garcias Font & Marcos) Hinz & Rosselló
- Globularia majoricensis Gand. – N. Mallorca
- Linaria pruinosa (Sennen & Pau) L.Sáez, F.B.Navarro, L.Gut., J.Fuentes
- Sibthorpia africana L.
- Veronica trichadena var. freyniana M.A.Fisch.

== Plumbaginaceae ==
- Limonium alcudianum Erben
- Limonium antonii-llorensii L.Llorens
- Limonium artruchium Erben
- Limonium balearicum (Pignatti) Brullo
- Limonium barceloi Gil & L.Llorens
- Limonium bianorii (Sennen & Pau) Erben
- Limonium biflorum (Pignatti) Pignatti – Mallorca
- Limonium boirae L.Llorens & Tébar
- Limonium bolosii Gil & L.Llorens
- Limonium bonafei Erben
- Limonium camposanum Erben
- Limonium caprariense (Font Quer & Marcos) Pignatti
  - Limonium caprariense subsp. caprariense
  - Limonium caprariense subsp. multiflorum Pignatti
- Limonium carregadorense Erben
- Limonium carvalhoi Rosselló & L.Sáez
- Limonium connivens Erben
- Limonium dragonericum Erben
- Limonium ebusitanum (Font Quer) Font Quer
- Limonium ejulabilis Rosselló, Mus & J.X.Soler
- Limonium × escarrei L.Llorens & Tébar (L. balearicum × L. oleifolium)
- Limonium formenterae L.Llorens – Formentera
- Limonium grosii L.Llorens
- Limonium gymnesicum Erben
- Limonium heterospicatum Erben
- Limonium leonardi-llorensii L.Sáez, Á.C.Carvalho & Rosselló
- Limonium magallufianum L.Llorens
- Limonium majoricum Pignatti
- Limonium marisolii L.Llorens
- Limonium migjornense L.Llorens
- Limonium minoricense Erben
- Limonium minutum (L.) Chaz. – Majorca and Minorca
- Limonium muradense Erben
- Limonium orellii Erben
- Limonium portopetranum Erben
- Limonium pseudarticulatum Erben
- Limonium pseudebusitanum Erben
- Limonium pseudodictyocladum L.Llorens – S. Mallorca
- Limonium retusum L.Llorens
- Limonium saxicola Erben
- Limonium scorpioides Erben
- Limonium sucronicum Erben
- Limonium tamarindanum Erben
- Limonium tenuicaule Erben
- Limonium validum Erben
- Limonium wiedmannii Erben – Eivissa, N. Formentera

== Poaceae ==
- Aira minoricensis P.Fraga, Romero Zarco & L.Sáez – Minorca
- Alpagrostis barceloi (L.Sáez & Rosselló) P.M.Peterson, Romasch., Soreng & Sylvester
- Avellinia longiaristata (Font Quer) Romero Zarco & L.Sáez – Menorca
- Dactylis glomerata subsp. nestorii Rosselló & L.Sáez – Ibiza, Formentera
- Helictochloa crassifolia (Font Quer) Romero Zarco
- Polygonum romanum subsp. balearicum Raffaelli & L.Villar – Mallorca

== Polypodiaceae ==
- Dryopteris pallida subsp. balearica (Litard.) Fraser-Jenk. – Majorca

== Primulaceae ==
- † Lysimachia minoricensis J.J.Rodr. – S. Menorca: Barranc de Sa Vall. Last recorded in 1959.
- Primula vulgaris subsp. balearica (Willk.) W.W.Sm. & Forrest – Mallorca

== Ranunculaceae ==
- Delphinium pentagynum subsp. formenteranum N.Torres, L.Sáez, Rosselló & C.Blanché – Formentera
- Helleborus lividus Aiton – Mallorca
- Ranunculus macrophyllus subsp. barceloi (Grau) Romo – Mallorca
- Ranunculus weyleri Marès – Mallorca

== Rhamnaceae ==
- Rhamnus × bermejoi P.Fraga & Rosselló (R. alaternus × R. ludovici-salvatoris)
- Rhamnus oleoides subsp. bourgaeana (Gand.) Rivas Mart. & J.M.Pizarro

== Rosaceae ==
- Cotoneaster majoricensis L.Sáez & Rosselló

== Rubiaceae ==
- Cynanchica paui subsp. paui
- Galium balearicum Briq. – Mallorca
- Galium crespianum Rodr. – Mallorca, Dragonera
- Galium friedrichii N.Torres, L.Sáez, Mus & Rosselló – Eivissa, Formentera
- Rubia balearica (Willk.) Porta
  - Rubia balearica subsp. balearica
  - Rubia balearica subsp. caespitosa (Font Quer & Marcos) Rosselló, L.Sáez & Mus – Cabrera

== Thymelaeaceae ==
- Daphne rodriguezii Texidor – Menorca, I. Colom
- Thymelaea velutina (Pourr. ex Cambess.) Endl.

== Urticaceae ==
- Urtica bianorii (Knoche) Paiva

== Violaceae ==
- Viola × balearica Rosselló, Mayol & Mus (V. dehnhardtii × V. jaubertiana)
- Viola jaubertiana Marès & Vigin. – Mallorca
- Viola odorata subsp. stolonifera (J.J.Rodr.) J.J.Orell & Romo
