= Arenaria peploides =

Arenaria peploides can refer to:

- Arenaria peploides L., a synonym of Honckenya peploides (L.) Ehrh.
- Arenaria peploides Lapeyr., a synonym of Polycarpon polycarpoides (Biv.) Zodda
