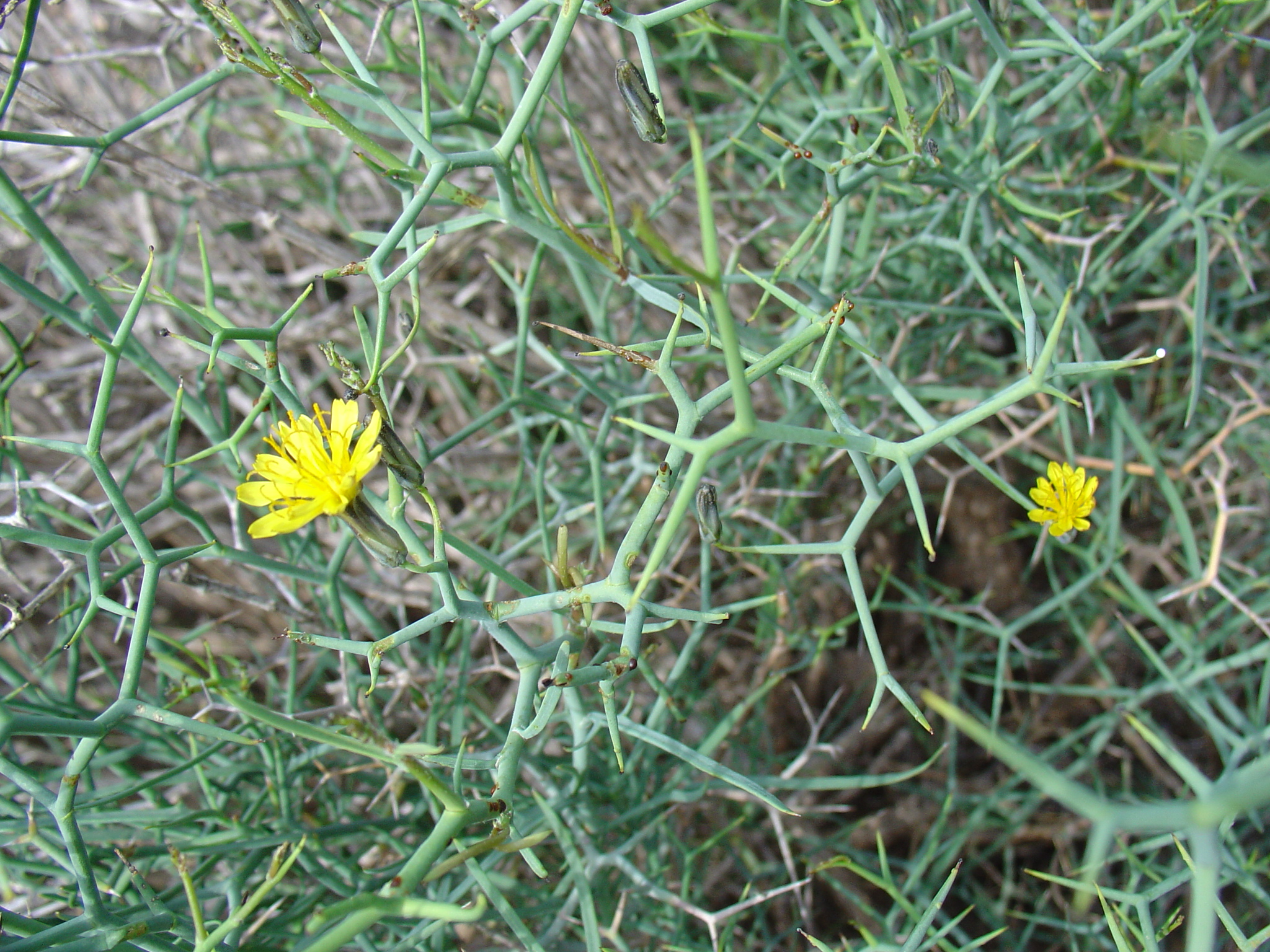
- Launaea arborescens

Scientific classification
- Kingdom: Plantae
- Clade: Tracheophytes
- Clade: Angiosperms
- Clade: Eudicots
- Clade: Asterids
- Order: Asterales
- Family: Asteraceae
- Subfamily: Cichorioideae
- Tribe: Cichorieae
- Subtribe: Hyoseridinae
- Genus: Launaea; Cass.

Type species
- Launaea bellidifolia Cass.

Synonyms
- Launaya Cass., alternate spelling; Rhabdotheca Cass.; Microrhynchus Less.; Paramicrorhynchus Kirp.; Lomatolepis Cass.; Brachyramphus DC.; Heterachaena Fresen.; Zollikoferia DC.; Ammoseris Endl.; Hexinia H.L.Yang

= Launaea =

Genus of flowering plants

Launaea is a genus of flowering plants in the family Asteraceae.

Species

- Launaea acanthodes
- Launaea acaulis
- Launaea almahrahensis
- Launaea amal-aminiae
- Launaea angolensis
- Launaea angustifolia
- Launaea arborescens
- Launaea aspleniifolia
- Launaea benadirensis
- Launaea bornmuelleri
- Launaea brunneri
- Launaea cabrae
- Launaea capitata
- Launaea cassiniana
- Launaea castanosperma
- Launaea cervicornis
- Launaea cornuta
- Launaea crassifolia
- Launaea crepoides
- Launaea fragilis
- Launaea gorgadensis
- Launaea hafunensis
- Launaea intybacea
- Launaea korovinii
- Launaea lackii
- Launaea lampsanoides
- Launaea lanifera
- Launaea massauensis
- Launaea massavensis
- Launaea microcephala
- Launaea mucronata
- Launaea nana
- Launaea nudicaulis
- Launaea oligocephala
- Launaea omanensis
- Launaea petitiana
- Launaea picridioides
- Launaea platyphylla
- Launaea polyclada
- Launaea polydichotoma
- Launaea procumbens
- Launaea pseudoabyssinica
- Launaea pumila
- Launaea quercifolia
- Launaea quettaënsis
- Launaea rarifolia
- Launaea rhynchocarpa
- Launaea rogersii
- Launaea rueppellii
- Launaea sarmentosa
- Launaea secunda
- Launaea socotrana
- Launaea spinosa
- Launaea stenocephala
- Launaea taraxacifolia
- Launaea thalassica
- Launaea verdickii
- Launaea viminea
- Launaea violacea
