= Launaea thalassica =

Conservation status
- Critically Endangered (IUCN 3.1)

Scientific classification
- Kingdom: Plantae
- Clade: Tracheophytes
- Clade: Angiosperms
- Clade: Eudicots
- Clade: Asterids
- Order: Asterales
- Family: Asteraceae
- Genus: Launaea
- Species: L. thalassica

Binomial name
- Launaea thalassica N.Kilian, Brochmann, Rustan

Species of flowering plant

Launaea thalassica is a species of flowering plants of the family Asteraceae. The species is endemic to Cape Verde. It is listed as critically endangered by the IUCN. The species name thalassica is Greek meaning "of the sea".

== Distribution ==
The species occurs in the north and northeast of the island of Brava. The plant is found between 300 and 500 m elevation.
