= Polycarpon alsinifolium =

Scientific classification
- Kingdom: Plantae
- Clade: Tracheophytes
- Clade: Angiosperms
- Clade: Eudicots
- Order: Caryophyllales
- Family: Caryophyllaceae
- Genus: Polycarpon
- Species: P. alsinifolium

Binomial name
- Polycarpon alsinifolium (Biv.) DC.

Species of plant

Polycarpon alsinifolium, the fourleaf manyseed, is a species of biennial herb in the family Caryophyllaceae (carpetweeds).

== Sources ==
This article incorporates text from a free content work. Licensed under CC0 (license statement/permission). Text taken from Polycarpon alsinifolium. Encyclopedia of Life.
