= Launaea socotrana =

Conservation status
- Least Concern (IUCN 3.1)

Scientific classification
- Kingdom: Plantae
- Clade: Tracheophytes
- Clade: Angiosperms
- Clade: Eudicots
- Clade: Asterids
- Order: Asterales
- Family: Asteraceae
- Genus: Launaea
- Species: L. socotrana

Binomial name
- Launaea socotrana N.Kilian

Species of flowering plant

Launaea socotrana is a species of flowering plant in the family Asteraceae. It is endemic to the islands of Socotra and Samhah in Yemen.
