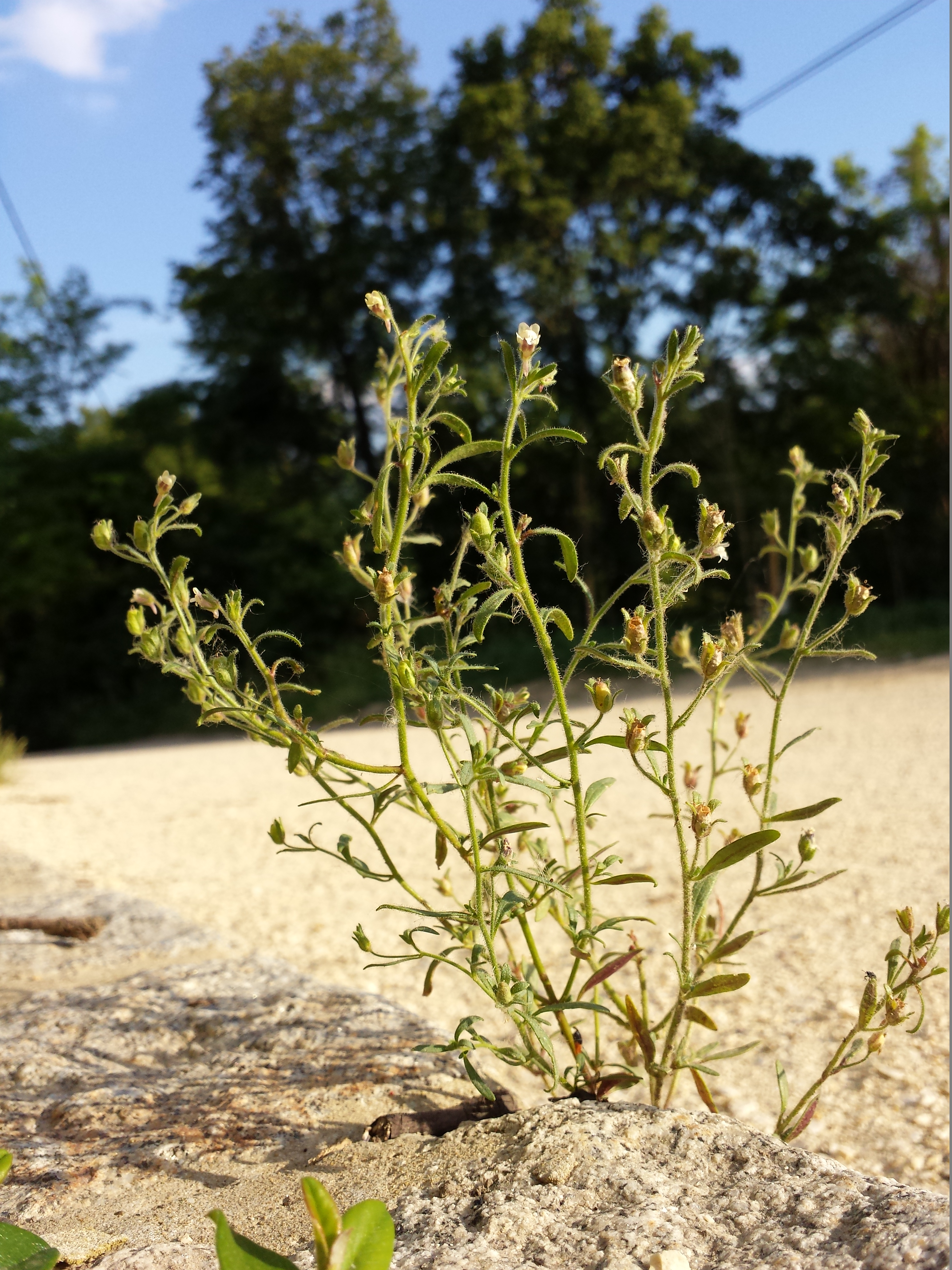

Scientific classification
- Kingdom: Plantae
- Clade: Tracheophytes
- Clade: Angiosperms
- Clade: Eudicots
- Clade: Asterids
- Order: Lamiales
- Family: Plantaginaceae
- Genus: Chaenorhinum
- Species: C. minus

Binomial name
- Chaenorhinum minus (L.) Lange

Synonyms
- Antirrhinum minus; Linaria minor; Microrrhinum minus

= Chaenorhinum minus =

Plant species in the veronica family

Chaenorhinum minus, also known as small toadflax in Europe and dwarf snapdragon in the US and Canada, is a very diminutive member of the plant family Plantaginaceae. It is native to continental Europe.

== Description ==
Chaenorhinum minus differs from many toadflaxes in having alternate leaves growing singly. Its leaves and sepals are covered with glandular hairs. Leaves are glaucous and sepals are green or purple. Flowers vary from pale purple to white. It is an annual herb, with a maximum height of 25 cm (9.8 in). It does not spread vegetatively. Flowering occurs June–July.

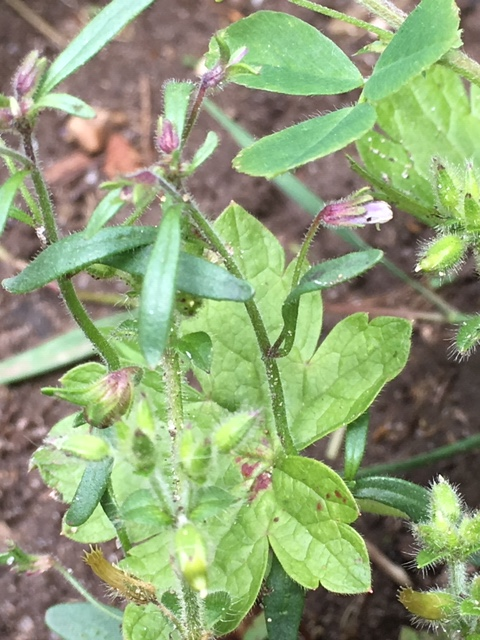
Chaenorhinum minus in a garden setting in the United Kingdom

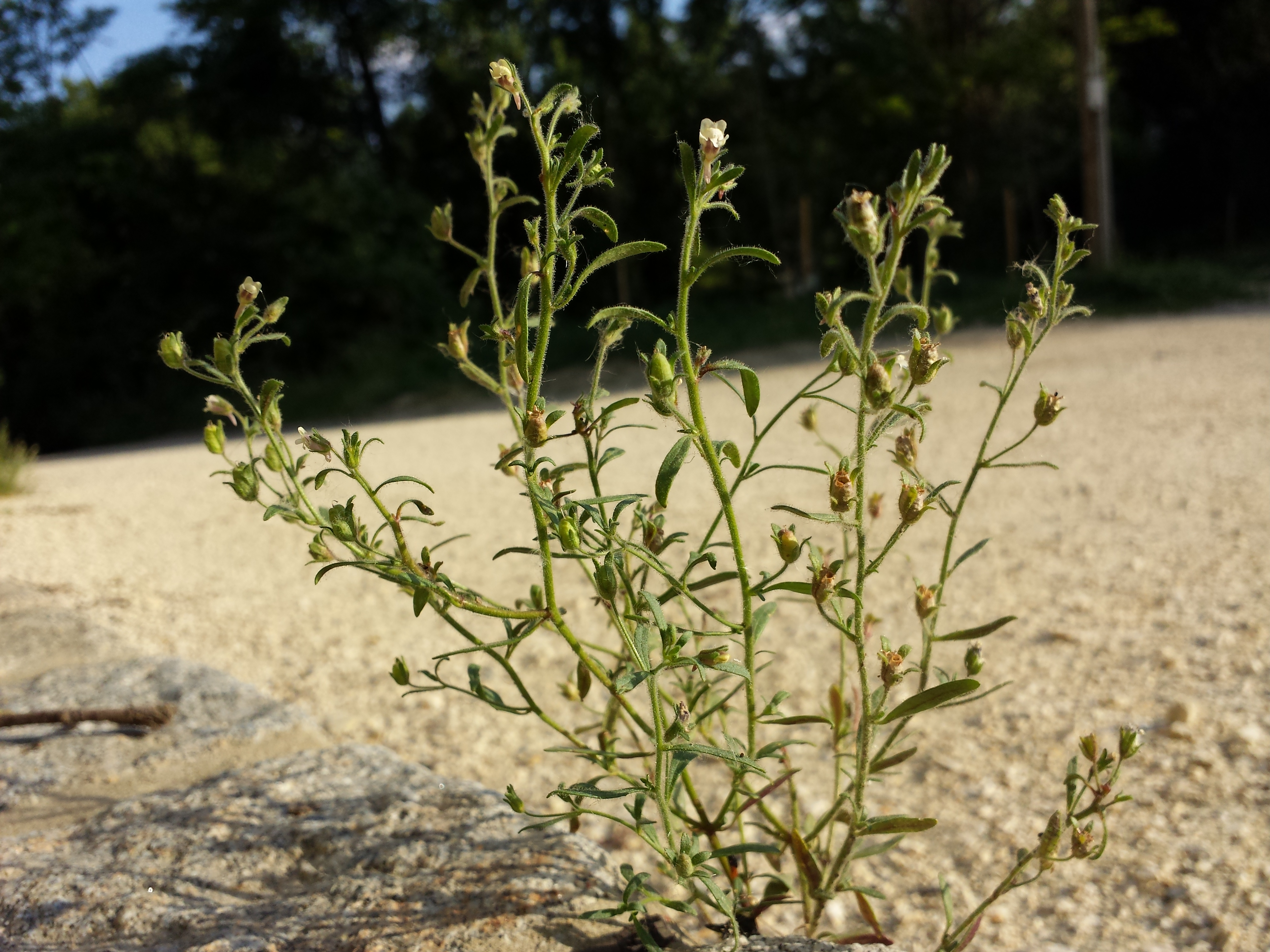
A larger individual of Chaenorhinum minus in Austria

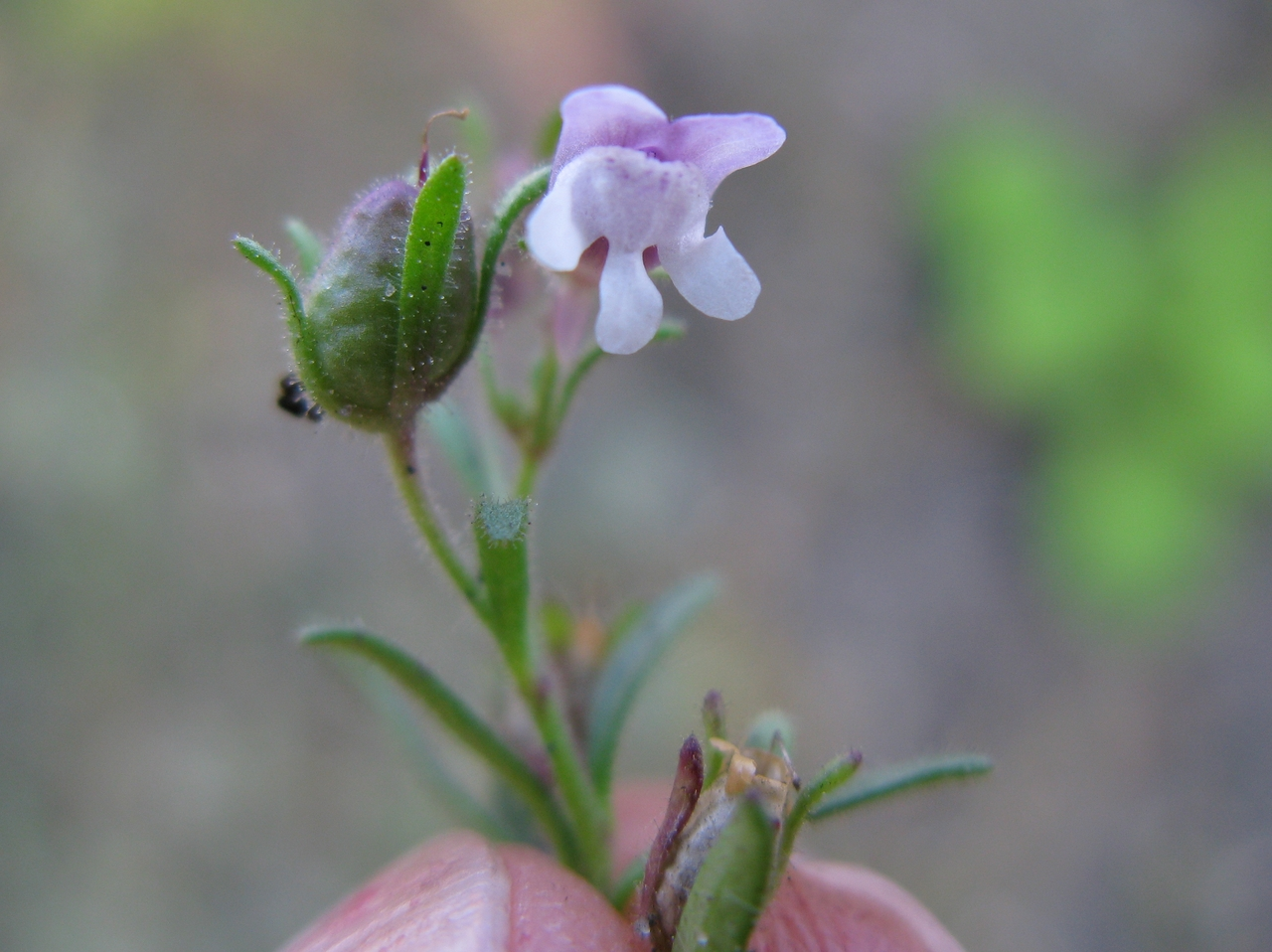
Flower of Chaenorhinum minus in Germany

== Taxonomy ==
Chaenorhinum minus was given the name Antirrhinum minus in 1753 by Carl Linnaeus. The botanist René Louiche Desfontaines placed it in the genus Linaria in 1798 and finally it was moved to the genus Chaenorhinum in 1870 by Johan Lange, giving the species its accepted name. Together with its genus it is classified in the family Plantaginaceae.

=== Subspecies ===
Four subspecies are accepted.

- Chaenorhinum minus subsp. anatolicum P.H.Davis – Ukraine, south European Russia, Turkey, Syria, northern Iraq, and Transcaucasia
- Chaenorhinum minus subsp. idaeum (Rech.f.) R.Fern. – Crete
- Chaenorhinum minus subsp. minus – Europe, Turkey, Morocco, and Algeria
- Chaenorhinum minus subsp. pseudorubrifolium Gamisans – Corsica

Chaenorhinum minus has 24 synonyms of the species or of three of its four subspecies including 13 species names.

Table of Synonyms
Name	Year	Synonym of:	Notes
Antirrhinum minor Raf.	1840	subsp. minus	= het.
Antirrhinum minus L.	1753	C. minus	≡ hom.
Chaenorhinum idaeum Rech.f.	1943	subsp. idaeum	= het.
Chaenorhinum klokovii Kotov	1954	subsp. anatolicum	= het.
Chaenorhinum praetermissum (Delastre) Lange	1870	subsp. minus	= het.
Chaenorhinum viscidum (Moench) Simonk.	1904	subsp. minus	= het.
Linaria minor (L.) Desf.	1798	C. minus	≡ hom.
Linaria praetermissa Delastre	1842	subsp. minus	= het.
Linaria viscida Moench	1794	subsp. minus	= het.
Microrrhinum idaeum (Rech.f.) Speta	1977	subsp. idaeum	= het.
Microrrhinum klokovii (Kotov) Speta	1980	subsp. anatolicum	= het.
Microrrhinum minus (L.) Fourr.	1869	C. minus	≡ hom.
Microrrhinum praetermissum (Delastre) Speta	1980	subsp. minus	= het.
Notes: ≡ homotypic synonym; = heterotypic synonym

== Habitat and distribution ==
It is such a small plant that it relies upon disturbance to compete with other plants for light. Once a common weed in farmers' fields, it has suffered from agricultural intensification and is now mainly seen in gardens and around railways, as well as roadsides and industrial sites. Its UK distribution shows it favours chalky soil.

This species is native to continental Europe, found mainly in south and central Europe, though it reaches as far north as Sweden. It is considered to have 'archaeophyte' status in the United Kingdom ie. is thought to have been introduced many centuries ago. It has also been introduced to the US and Canada.
