= Launaea gorgadensis =

Conservation status
- Critically Endangered (IUCN 3.1)

Scientific classification
- Kingdom: Plantae
- Clade: Tracheophytes
- Clade: Angiosperms
- Clade: Eudicots
- Clade: Asterids
- Order: Asterales
- Family: Asteraceae
- Genus: Launaea
- Species: L. gorgadensis

Binomial name
- Launaea gorgadensis (Bolle) N.Kilian

Synonyms
- Sonchus bollei Sch.Bip. ex Bolle; Sonchus gorgadensis Bolle

Species of flowering plant

Launaea gorgadensis is a species of flowering plants of the family Asteraceae. The species is endemic to Cape Verde. It is listed as a critically endangered plant by the IUCN.

== Distribution ==
The species is found in the northwest of Cape Verde, in the islands of Santo Antão, São Vicente and São Nicolau. The plant occurs between 100–450 m (330–1,480 ft) elevation. It is a mesophyte plant which grows in sub-humid and semi-arid areas.
