= Launaea crepoides =

Conservation status
- Vulnerable (IUCN 3.1)

Scientific classification
- Kingdom: Plantae
- Clade: Tracheophytes
- Clade: Angiosperms
- Clade: Eudicots
- Clade: Asterids
- Order: Asterales
- Family: Asteraceae
- Genus: Launaea
- Species: L. crepoides

Binomial name
- Launaea crepoides Balf.f.

Species of plant

Launaea crepoides is a species of flowering plant in the family Asteraceae. It is found only in on the islands of Socotra and Samhah in Yemen. Its natural habitats are subtropical or tropical dry forests and subtropical or tropical dry shrubland.
