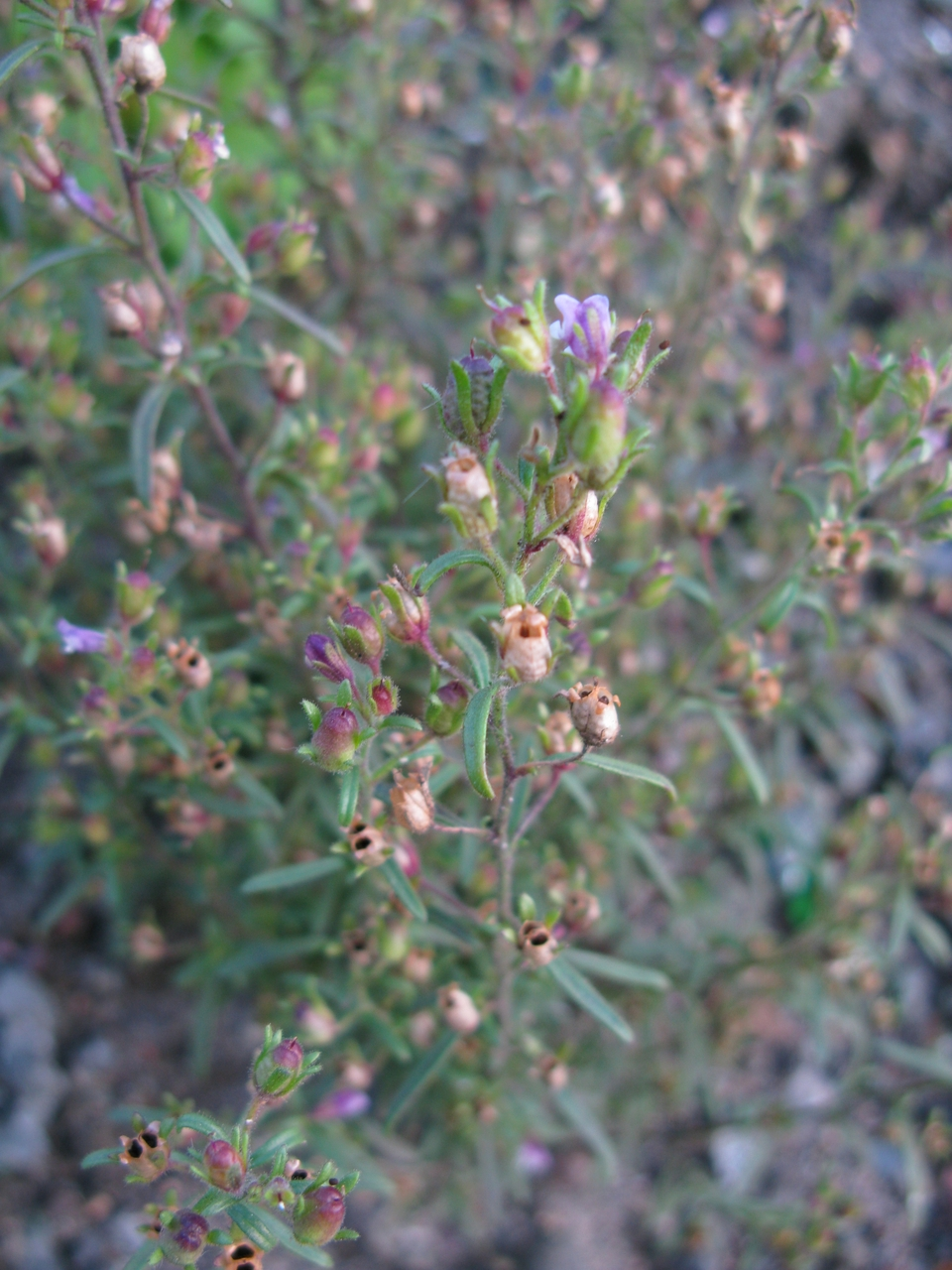
- Chaenorhinum minus

Scientific classification
- Kingdom: Plantae
- Clade: Tracheophytes
- Clade: Angiosperms
- Clade: Eudicots
- Clade: Asterids
- Order: Lamiales
- Family: Plantaginaceae
- Tribe: Antirrhineae
- Genus: Chaenorhinum (D.C.) Rchb. (1828)

Species
- 27; see text

Synonyms
- Chaenarrhinum (DC.) Rchb. (1828), orth. var.; Hueblia Speta (1982); Microrrhinum Fourr. (1869)

= Chaenorhinum =

Genus of flowering plants

Chaenorhinum is a genus of flowering plants. It includes 27 species of annual and perennial herbs native to the Mediterranean Basin, Europe, and western Asia to the western Himalayas. They thrive in dry stony areas and scree. They are closely related to snapdragons. The leaves are linear to oblong or rounded, opposite at the base. The flowers resemble snapdragons, being typically zygomorphic, hooded, lobed and spurred. They are borne in terminal racemes or singly in the leaf axils of the branching stems.

== Species ==
27 species are accepted.

- Chaenorhinum calycinum (Banks & Sol.) P.H.Davis
- Chaenorhinum cryptarum (Boiss. & Hausskn.) P.H.Davis
- Chaenorhinum flexuosum (Desf.) Lange
- Chaenorhinum foroughii Speta
- Chaenorhinum gamezii Güemes, F.Marchal, E.Carrió & Blasco
- Chaenorhinum glareosum (Boiss.) Willk.
- Chaenorhinum grandiflorum (Coss.) Willk.
- Chaenorhinum grossecostatum Speta
- Chaenorhinum huber-morathii P.H.Davis
- Chaenorhinum johnstonii (Stapf) Pennell
- Chaenorhinum litorale (Bernh. ex Willd.) Rouy
- Chaenorhinum macropodum (Boiss. & Reut.) Lange
- Chaenorhinum minus (L.) Lange – known as "small toadflax" or "dwarf snapdragon"
- Chaenorhinum origanifolium (L.) Kostel.
- Chaenorhinum raveyi (Boiss.) Pau
- Chaenorhinum reticulatum Speta
- Chaenorhinum robustum Loscos
- Chaenorhinum rubrifolium (Robill. & Castagne ex DC.) Fourr.
- Chaenorhinum rupestre (Guss.) Speta
- Chaenorhinum semiglabrum (Loidi & A.Galán) Alejandre, Arizal. & J.Benito
- Chaenorhinum semispeluncarum Yıldırım, Kit Tan, Şenol & Pirhan
- Chaenorhinum serpyllifolium (Lange) Lange
- Chaenorhinum suttonii Benedí & P.Monts.
- Chaenorhinum tenellum (Cav.) Lange
- Chaenorhinum tuberculatum Speta
- Chaenorhinum villosum (L.) Lange
- Chaenorhinum yildirimlii Kit Tan, Yıldırım, Şenol & Pirhan
