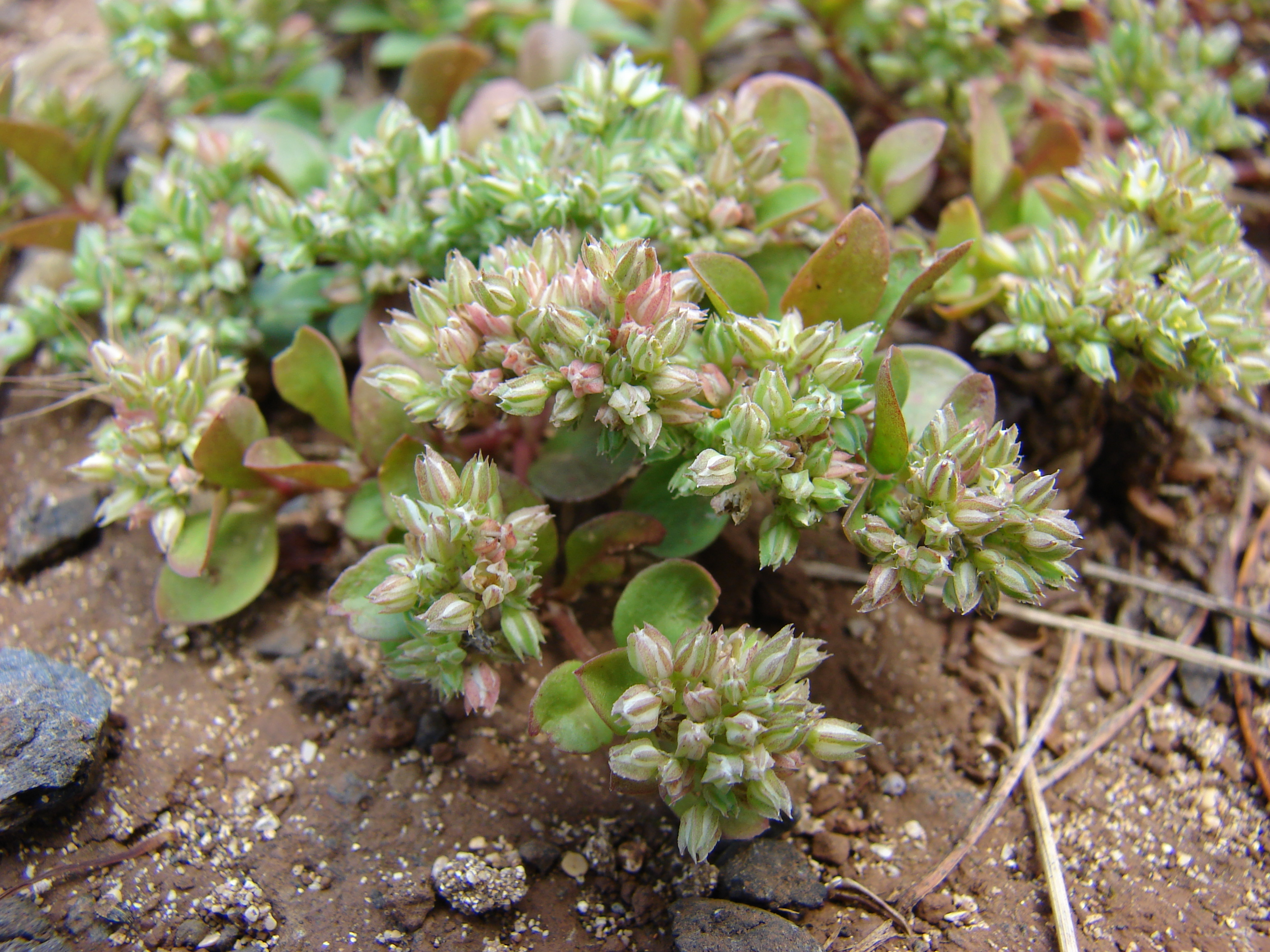
- Polycarpon tetraphyllum

Scientific classification
- Kingdom: Plantae
- Clade: Tracheophytes
- Clade: Angiosperms
- Clade: Eudicots
- Order: Caryophyllales
- Family: Caryophyllaceae
- Genus: Polycarpon; Loefl. (1759)

Species
- See text

Synonyms
- Arversia Cambess. (1830); Hapalosia Wall. ex Wight & Arn. (1834)

= Polycarpon =

Genus of flowering plants

Polycarpon is a genus of flowering plants in the family Caryophyllaceae. They are known generally as manyseeds. There are seven species distributed in temperate and tropical regions around the world, including western North America, South America, Europe, Africa, and West, South, and Southeast Asia. These plants are low, matted annuals spreading slender stems along the ground or erect with many branches. The best-known species is perhaps Polycarpon tetraphyllum, which is native to southern Europe but is present in many other regions as an introduced species.

== Species ==
Seven species are accepted.

- Polycarpon alsinifolium (Biv.) DC.
- Polycarpon depressum Nutt. – California manyseed
- Polycarpon polycarpoides (Biv.) Zodda
- Polycarpon prostratum (Forssk.) Asch. & Schweinf.
- Polycarpon succulentum J.Gay
- Polycarpon tetraphyllum (L.) L. – fourleaf manyseed
- Polycarpon urbanianum Muschl.
