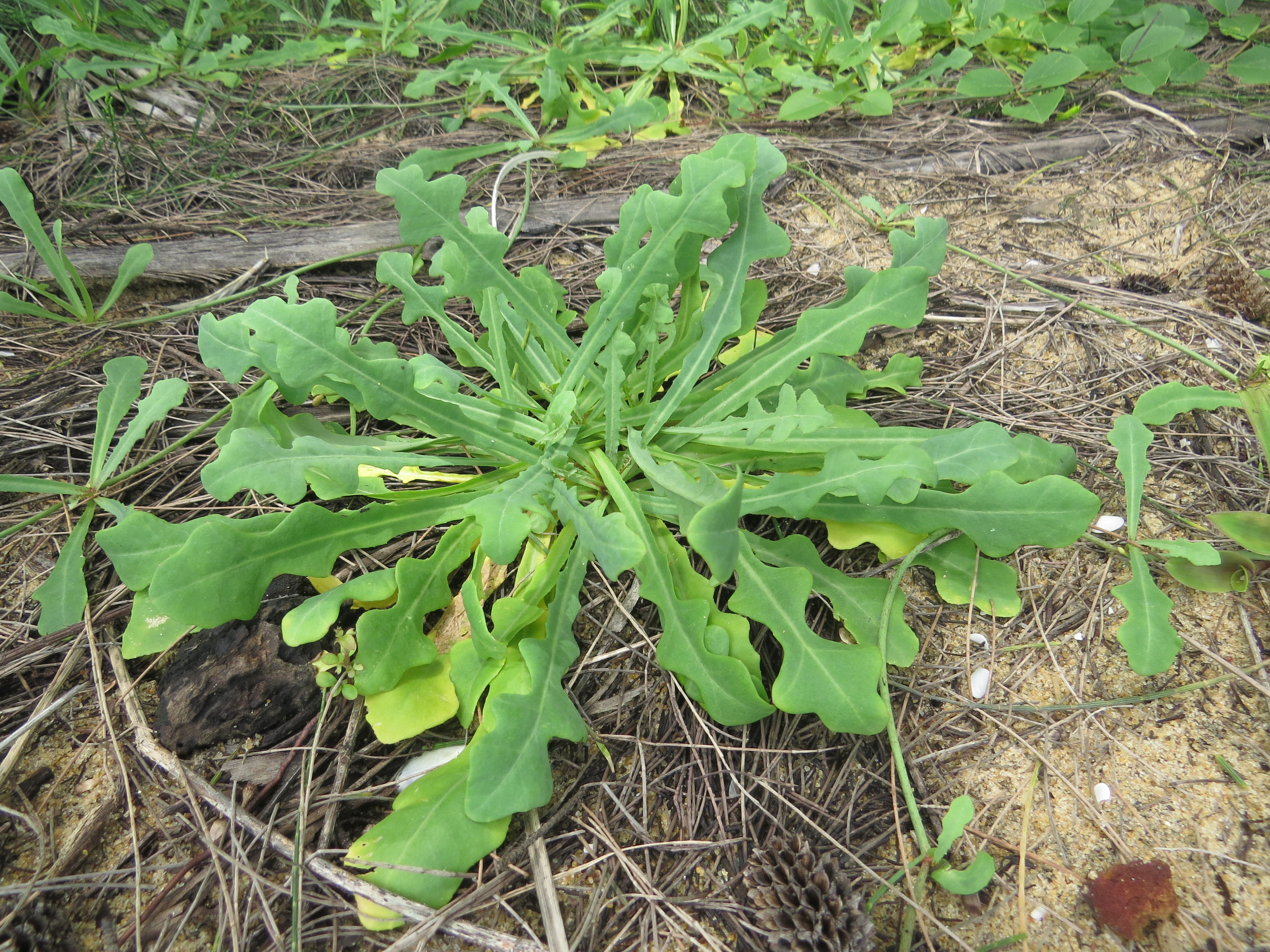

Scientific classification
- Kingdom: Plantae
- Clade: Tracheophytes
- Clade: Angiosperms
- Clade: Eudicots
- Clade: Asterids
- Order: Asterales
- Family: Asteraceae
- Genus: Launaea
- Species: L. sarmentosa

Binomial name
- Launaea sarmentosa (Willd.) Sch.Bip. ex Kuntze

Synonyms
- Launaea bellidifolia Cass.; Launaea pinnatifida Cass.; Microrhynchus dregeanus DC.; Prenanthes sarmentosa Willd.

= Launaea sarmentosa =

Species of plant

Launaea sarmentosa is a perennial herb species in the family Asteraceae. It is native to coastal areas in Africa (east coast), Madagascar, the Seychelles, Mauritius, India, Sri Lanka, Maldives and Southeast Asia. It is naturalized in Western Australia.

== Uses ==
Kuhlha-filaa (IAST Kuḷḷafilā, ކުއްޅަފިލާ in Maldivian) has been used as a dietary plant in the Maldives for centuries in dishes such as mas huni and also as a medicinal plant.

== Bibliography ==
- Yusriyya Salih, A Pharmacognostical and Pharmacological Evaluation of a Folklore Medicinal Plant "Kulhafila" (Launea sarmentosa (Willd) Schultz-Bip.ex Kuntze). Gujarat Ayurved University – 2011
- Xavier Romero-Frias, Eating on the Islands, Himāl Southasian, Vol. 26 no. 2, pages 69–91 ISSN 1012-9804
