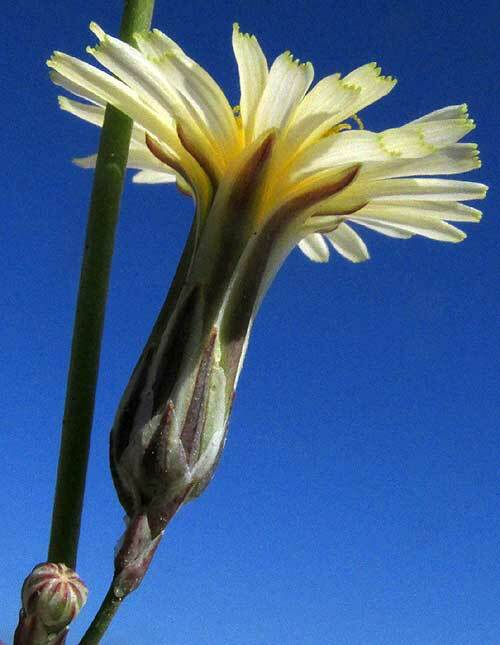
- Launaea intybacea flowering head

Scientific classification
- Kingdom: Plantae
- Clade: Tracheophytes
- Clade: Angiosperms
- Clade: Eudicots
- Clade: Asterids
- Order: Asterales
- Family: Asteraceae
- Genus: Launaea
- Species: L. intybacea

Binomial name
- Launaea intybacea (Jacq.) Beauverd 1910

Synonyms
- See text

= Launaea intybacea =

Species of flowering plant

Launaea intybacea, with numerous English names, and often sharing the names wild lettuce and bitter lettuce with several other species, is a flowering plant of the family Asteraceae.

== Description ==
Launaea intybacea is an erect annual or biennial herb growing up to 1 m (3 ft 3 in) tall. During its early stages of development it may form a rosette of basal leaves. The hairless stems can be branched or unbranched. Leaves often are purple on the lower surface, up to 28 cm (11 in) long and 11 cm (4.3 in) wide, and have margins which are shallowly to deeply toothed. Leaf tips taper to a slender point, and the bases taper to the stem forming a "winged" petiole.

Flowering heads appear alone or as a few in a cluster on a short peduncle. Each head contains 15-35 reduced flowers known as florets, which have to pale to bright yellow corollas up to 9 mm (0.35 in) long. All the corollas are long, slender and tongue-shaped, not cylindrical. The florets arise from within a green, pear-shaped to cylindrical structure known as an involucre, which consists of overlapping bracts, the inner ones 2-3 times longer than the outer. The bracts' margins are noticeably thin and pale. Each floret produces a dry, one-seeded, cypsela-type fruit which, when mature, bears atop it numerous, spreading, white bristles up to 9 mm (0.35 in) long.

== Distribution ==
The iNaturalist page documenting locations of observations of Launaea intybacea by citizen scientists worldwide indicates that the species occurs in warmer parts of the world, from the Americas to southern Europe, Africa and the Indian subcontinent. It is noticeably missing from southeastern Asia and Australia.

The species is a native of Africa introduced to the Caribbean area and Central America during the early trans-Atlantic slave trade from West Africa,

== Habitat ==
Launaea intybacea is a weed adapted to dry conditions and said to be capable of spreading rapidly in disturbed areas. Images on this page show an individual growing at the edge of a sidewalk beside the seawall of a small town along the Mexican coast beside the Gulf of Mexico.

== Human uses ==
=== As food ===
In Ethiopia, Launaea intybacea is regarded as a "famine food" which in normal times is uprooted as a weed, but during famines the leaves are boiled to reduce their natural bitterness.

Green Deane, author of the popular book Eat the Weeds with Green Deane, warns that the raw plants are bitter, needing to be cooked: "Don't be surprised if you have to boil leaves 40 minutes or so in a lot of water to make it edible."

=== In traditional medicine ===
In Saudi Arabia, all parts of the plant are use in traditional medicine for a variety of ailments, from jaundice and skin diseases to liver disorders and dry coughs. It is thought to aid digestion and, in women, to promote lactation. Laboratory analyses have revealed that in fact its compounds show anti-inflammatory, antithrombotic and antitumor effects. A study using albino rats specifically validated the traditional use of Launaea intybacea for liver disorders.

== Taxonomy ==
Within the Asteraceae, Launaea intybacea is assigned to the subfamily Chicorioideae, the tribe Cichorieae, and the substribe Hyoseridinae. Within Launaea, genetic analysis supports the inclusion of the species intybacea in the section Microrhynchus.

Classical taxonomy has found it challenging to settle on the name Launaea intybacea, as indicated by its numerous synonyms:

- Brachyramphus intybaceus (Jacq.) (1838)
- Cicerbita intybacea (Jacq.) Wallr. (1822)
- Lactuca intybacea Jacq. (1784)
- Phaenixopus intybaceus (Jacq.) Less. (1832)
- Ammoseris surinamensis (Miq.) (1847)
- Brachyramphus caribaeus DC. (1838)
- Brachyramphus goraeensis (Lam.) DC. (1838)
- Brachyramphus remotiflorus (DC.) Kamelin (1993)
- Brachyramphus schimperi Sch.Bip. ex Schweinf (1867)
- Brachyramphus sonchifolius (Willd.) DC. (1838)
- Chondrilla sonchifolia (Willd.) Poir. (1811)
- Lactuca arabica Jaub. & Spach (1850)
- Lactuca goraeensis (Lam.) Sch.Bip. (1842)
- Lactuca heyneana DC. (1838)
- Lactuca nubica Sch.Bip. (1842)
- Lactuca octophylla Sch.Bip. (1842)
- Lactuca pinnatifida (Lour.) Merr. (1935)
- Lactuca remotiflora DC. (1834)
- Lactuca runcinata DC. (1834)
- Lactuca schimperi Jaub. & Spach (1850)
- Lactuca virgata Tausch (1829)
- Launaea goraeensis Hoffm. (1893)
- Launaea kuriensis Vierh. (1906)
- Launaea remotiflora (DC.) Amin ex Rech.f. (1977)
- Microrhynchus octophyllus Hochst. ex Oliv. (1877)
- Microrhynchus surinamensis Miq. (1843)
- Prenanthes sonchifolia Willd. (1803)
- Scorzonera africana Poir. (1817)
- Scorzonera pinnatifida Lour. (1790)
- Sonchus ciliatus Perr. ex DC. (1838)
- Sonchus goraeensis Lam. (1792)
- Sonchus paniculatus Moc. & Sessé ex DC. (1838)
- Sonchus spachii Schweinf. (1867)
- Sonchus taraxacifolius Spreng. (1826)
- Trachodes paniculata D.Don (1830)

== Etymology ==
The genus name Launaea is a New Latin construct commemorating J.C.M. Mordant de Launay (1750?-1816), a French lawyer and later librarian of the Museum d'Histoire Naturelle in Paris.

The species name intybacea in New Latin based on the Ancient Greek entybon, a name applied to endive, chicory, and other similar plants with edible leaves.

== Gallery ==
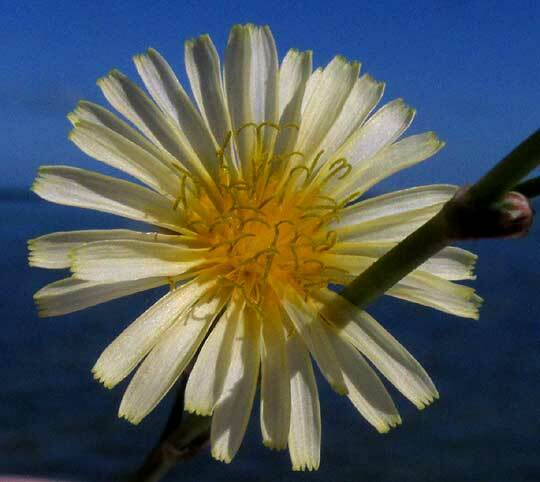
Launaea intybacea flowering head from above

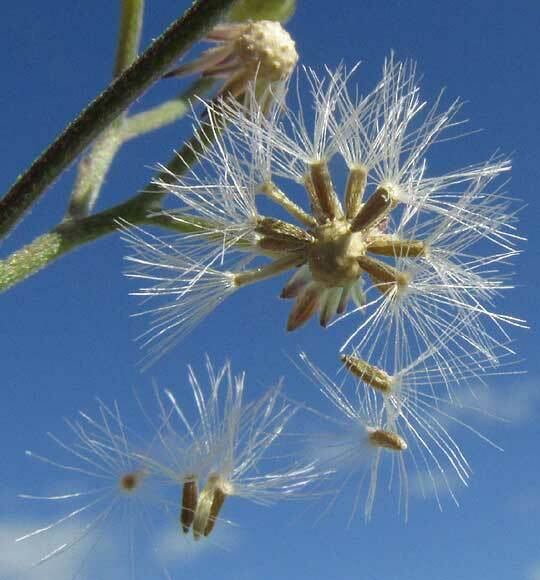
Launaea intybacea fruiting head releasing cypsela-type fruits

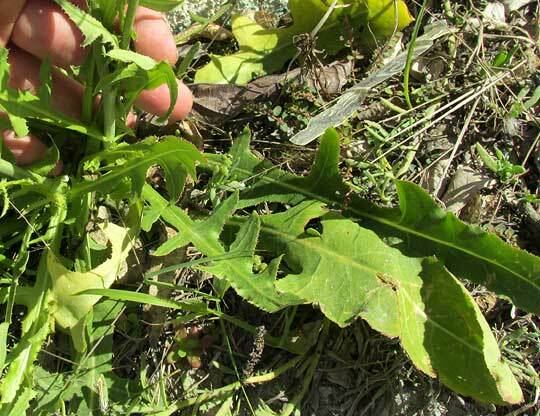
Launaea intybacea leaves

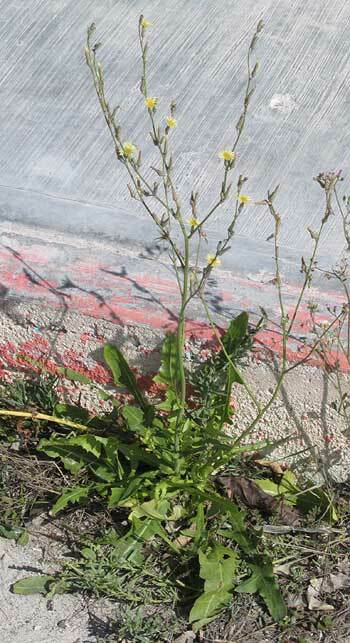
Launaea intybacea as a weed
