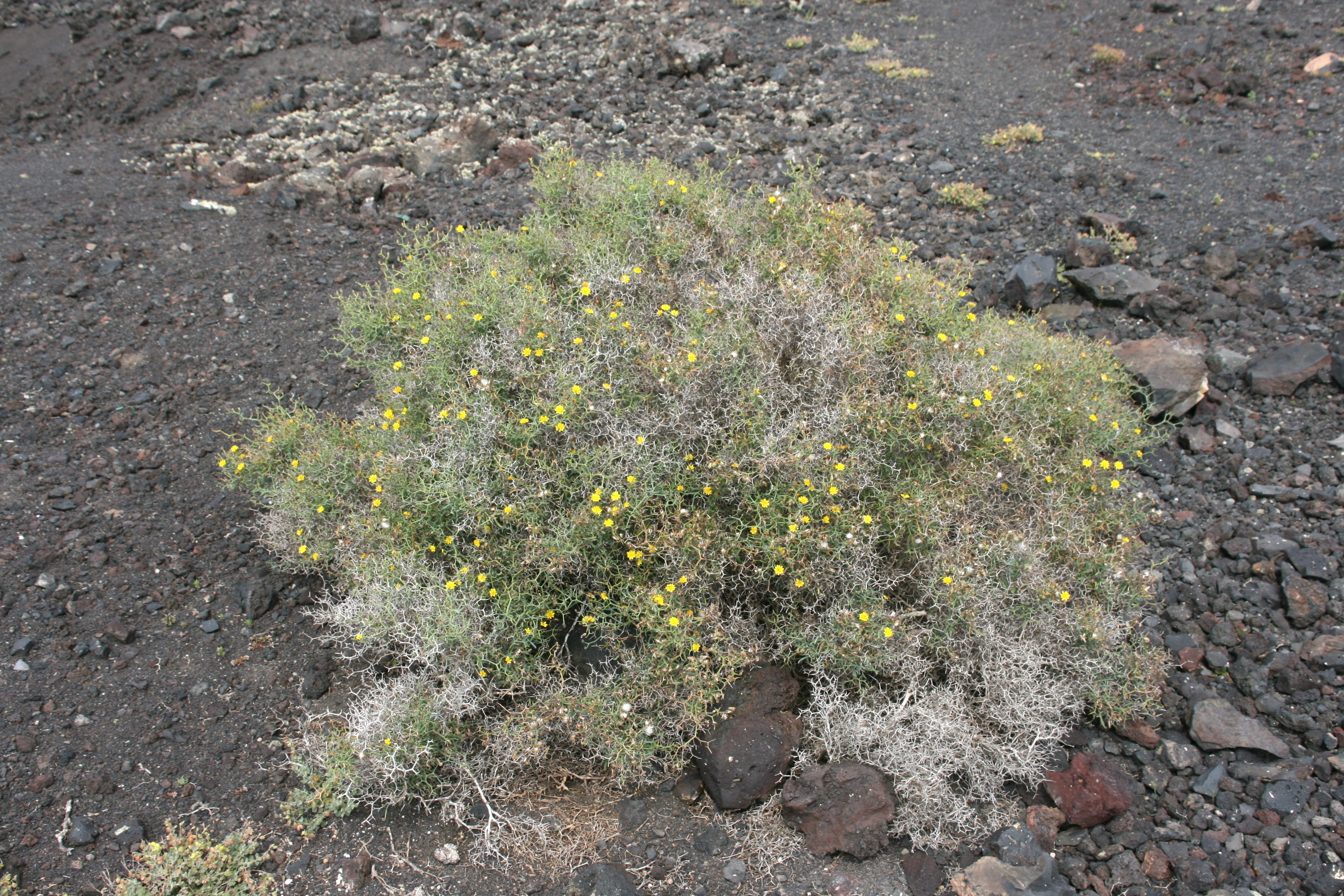

Scientific classification
- Kingdom: Plantae
- Clade: Tracheophytes
- Clade: Angiosperms
- Clade: Eudicots
- Clade: Asterids
- Order: Asterales
- Family: Asteraceae
- Genus: Launaea
- Species: L. arborescens

Binomial name
- Launaea arborescens (Batt.) Murb.
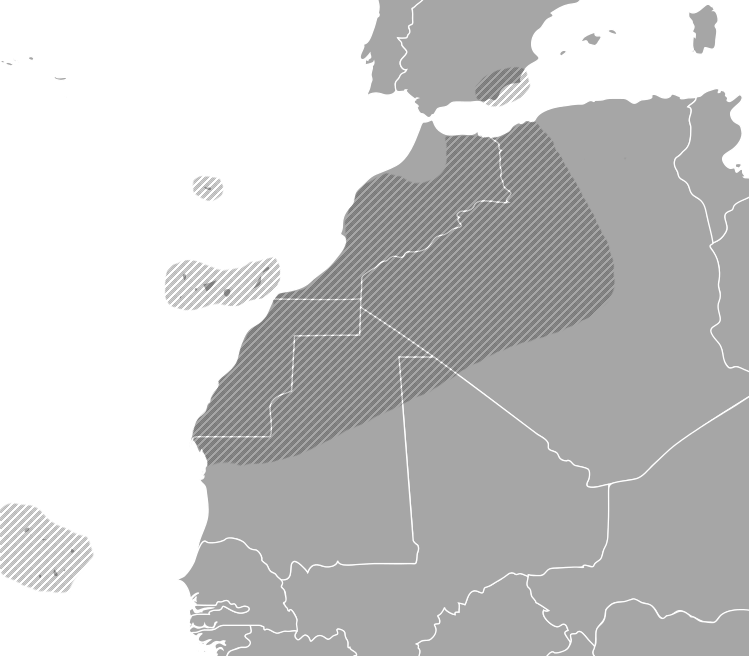

Synonyms
- Launaea freyniana Pau; Launaea melanostigma Pett.; Prenanthes spinosa T.E.Bowdich; Sonchus freynianus Huter & al.; Zollikoferia arborescens Batt.

= Launaea arborescens =

Species of flowering plant

Launaea arborescens is a species of flowering plant in the family Asteraceae.

== Taxonomy ==
The species was first described by Jules Aimé Battandier in 1888 as Zollikoferia arborescens. It was transferred to Launaea in 1923 by Svante Samuel Murbeck.

== Distribution ==
The species occurs in Spain, the Canary Islands, Algeria, Morocco, Mauritania and Cape Verde.

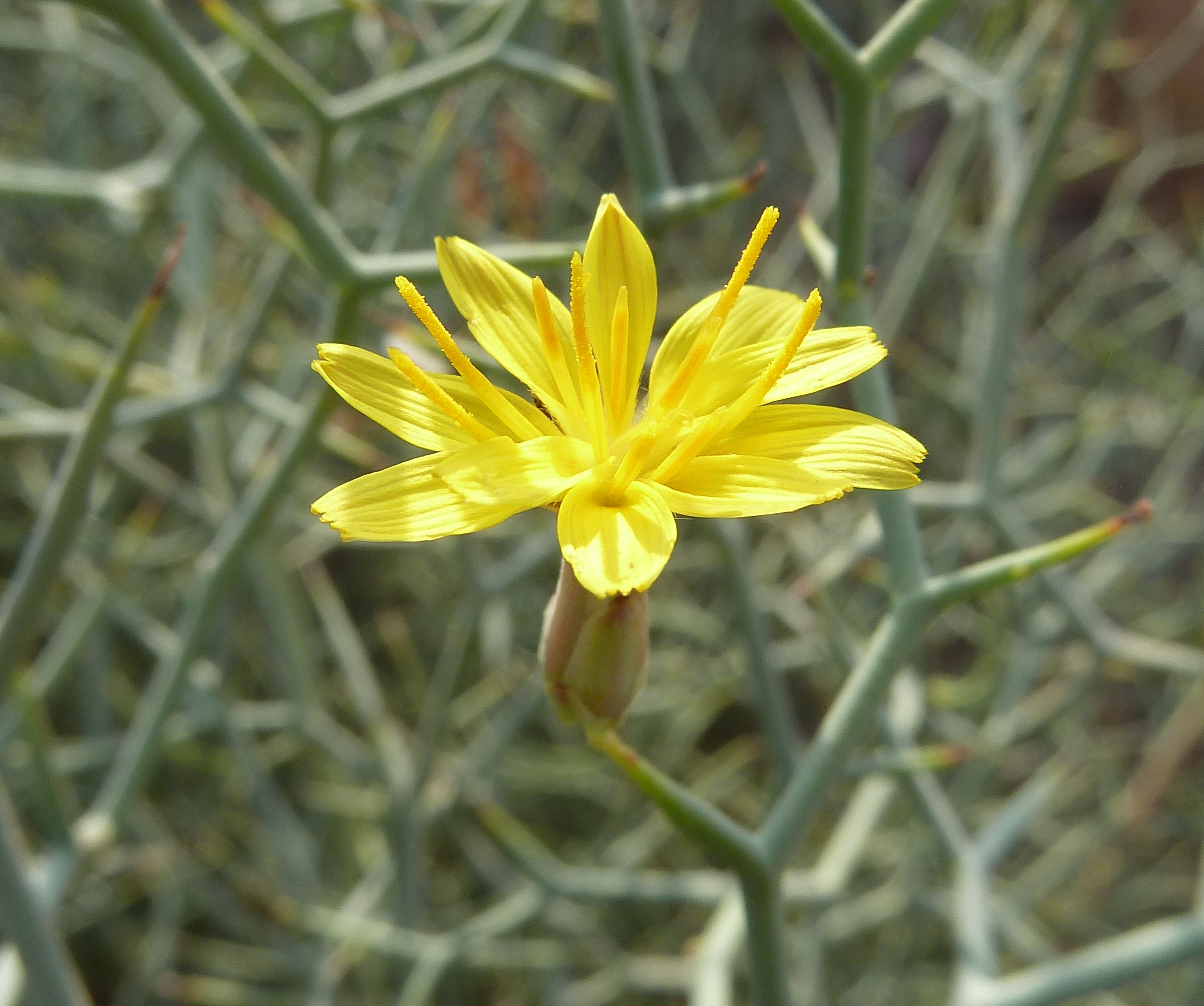
Inflorescence

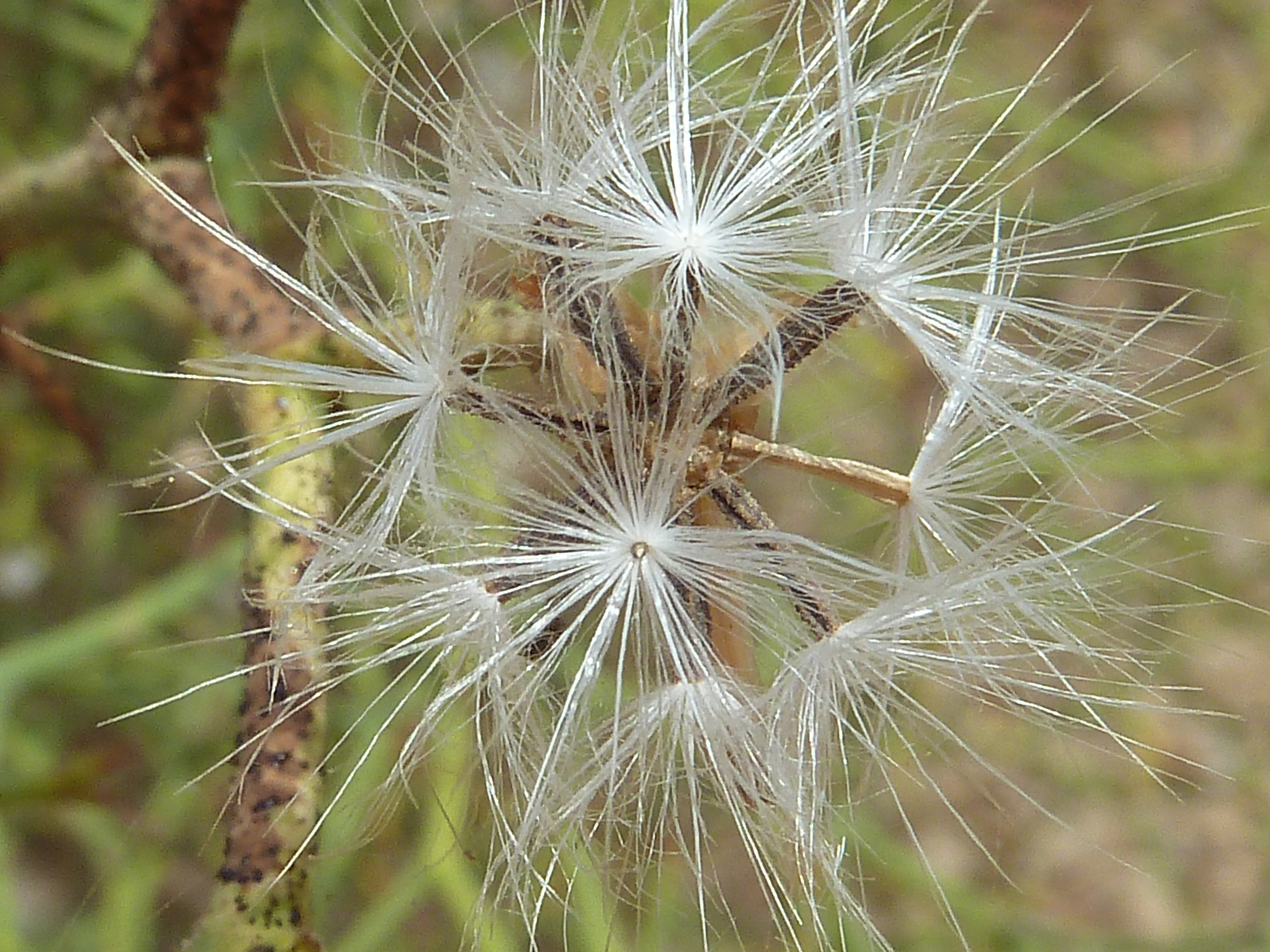
Fruit (cypselas)
