= Polycarpon depressum =

Scientific classification
- Kingdom: Plantae
- Clade: Tracheophytes
- Clade: Angiosperms
- Clade: Eudicots
- Order: Caryophyllales
- Family: Caryophyllaceae
- Genus: Polycarpon
- Species: P. depressum

Binomial name
- Polycarpon depressum Nutt.

Species of flowering plant

Polycarpon depressum is a species of flowering plant in the family Caryophyllaceae known by the common name California manyseed. It is native to southern California and Baja California, where it grows in sandy habitat such as coastal bluffs and disturbed habitat types such as fields and roadsides. It is a small annual herb producing a spreading, branching stem just a few centimeters long that lies prostrate on the ground. A few pairs of oppositely arranged leaves line the stems, each oval in shape narrowing to a petiole and measuring about a centimeter long. The inflorescence is a cluster of rounded flowers with minute petals tucked inside a calyx of pointed sepals.
