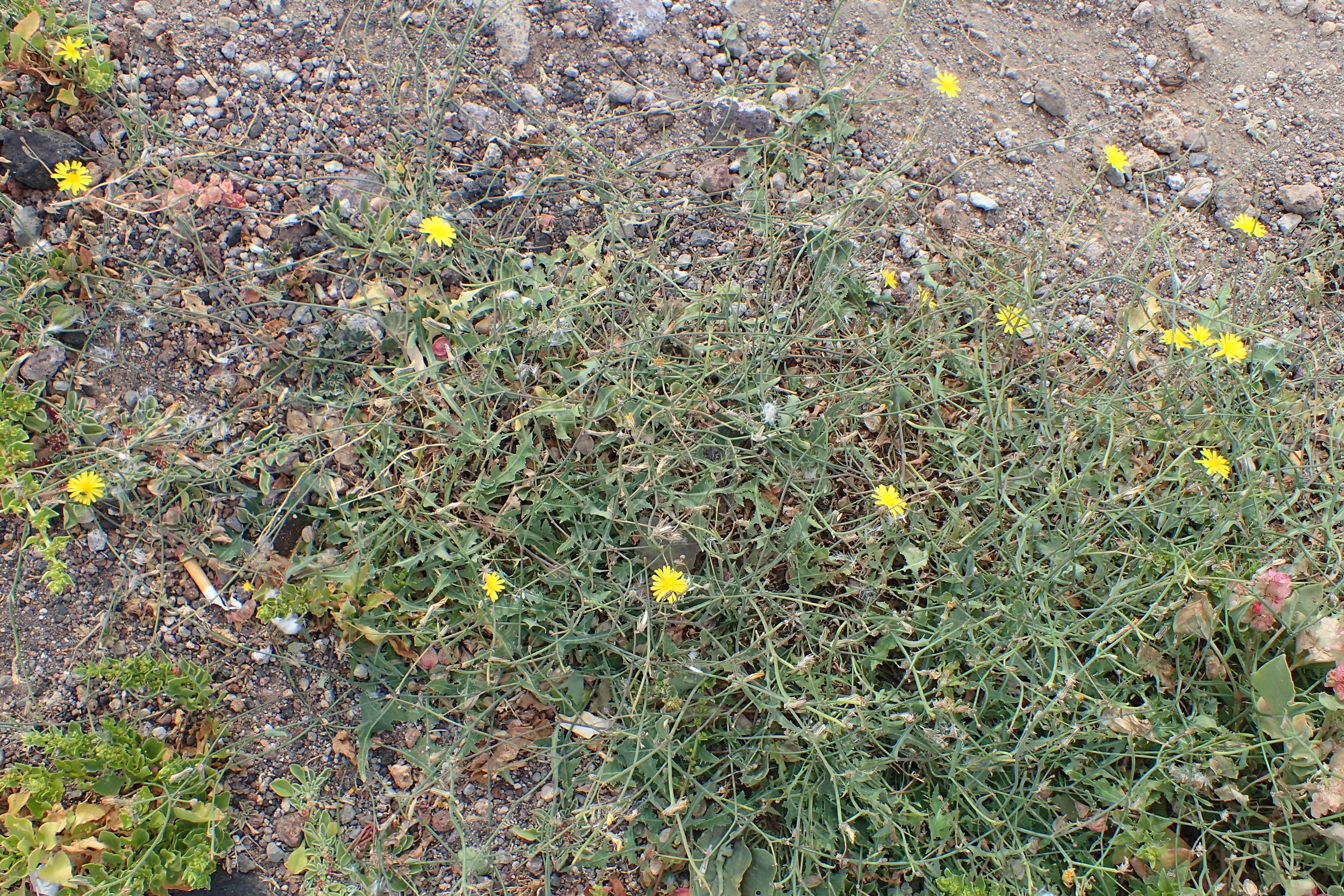

Scientific classification
- Kingdom: Plantae
- Clade: Tracheophytes
- Clade: Angiosperms
- Clade: Eudicots
- Clade: Asterids
- Order: Asterales
- Family: Asteraceae
- Genus: Launaea
- Species: L. nudicaulis

Binomial name
- Launaea nudicaulis (L.) Hook.f.

Synonyms
- Ammoseris nudicaulis (L.) D.Dietr.; Atalanthus nudicaulis (L.) Pomel; Chondrilla nudicaulis L.; Lactuca nudicaulis (L.) Murray; Lomatolepis nudicaulis (L.) Cass.; Microrhynchus nudicaulis (L.) Less.; Rhabdotheca nudicaulis (L.) Pomel; Sonchus nudicaulis (L.) Sch.Bip.; Zollikoferia nudicaulis (L.) Boiss.

= Launaea nudicaulis =

Species of flowering plant

Launaea nudicaulis, commonly known as the bold-leaf launaea, is a species of plant native to an area from Spain in the west through North Africa, the Arabian Peninsula and western Asia to India in the east, including the Negev and Judean desert. In India it is known under a common name bhatal and is found in Hazara, Mansehra, Multan, Rawalpindi and Scinde districts of Punjab and Lahore.
