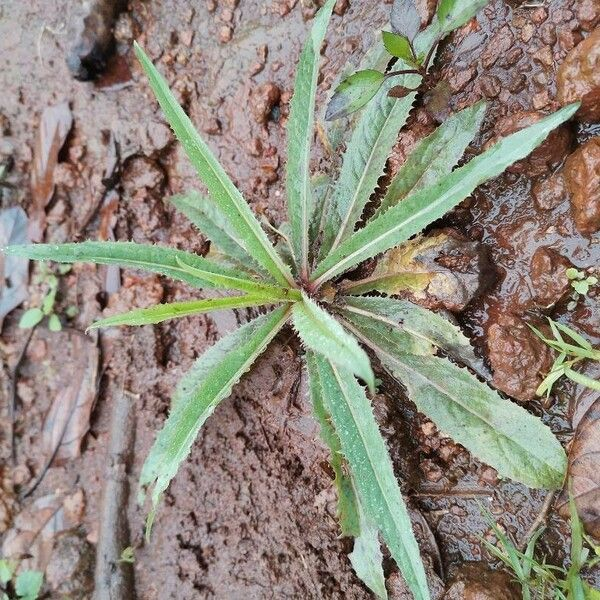

Conservation status
- Vulnerable (IUCN 3.1)

Scientific classification
- Kingdom: Plantae
- Clade: Tracheophytes
- Clade: Angiosperms
- Clade: Eudicots
- Clade: Asterids
- Order: Asterales
- Family: Asteraceae
- Genus: Launaea
- Species: L. picridioides

Binomial name
- Launaea picridioides (Webb) B.L.Rob.

Synonyms
- Lactuca picridioides (Webb) Henriq.; Microrhynchus picridioides (Webb) Walp.; Rhabdotheca picridioides Webb.

= Launaea picridioides =

Species of flowering plant

Launaea picridioides is a species of flowering plants of the family Asteraceae. The species is endemic to Cape Verde. It is listed as a vulnerable species by the IUCN.

== Distribution ==
The species is found in the northwest of Cape Verde, in the islands of Santo Antão, São Vicente and São Nicolau. The plant is found between 200 and 900 m elevation.
