= Launaea rhynchocarpa =

Conservation status
- Least Concern (IUCN 3.1)

Scientific classification
- Kingdom: Plantae
- Clade: Tracheophytes
- Clade: Angiosperms
- Clade: Eudicots
- Clade: Asterids
- Order: Asterales
- Family: Asteraceae
- Genus: Launaea
- Species: L. rhynchocarpa

Binomial name
- Launaea rhynchocarpa (Balf.f.) B.Mies

Synonyms
- Lactuca rhynchocarpa Balf.f.

Species of plant

Launaea rhynchocarpa is a species of flowering plant in the family Asteraceae. It is endemic to the islands of Socotra and Abd al Kuri in Yemen. Its natural habitats are subtropical or tropical dry forests and subtropical or tropical dry shrubland.
