= Naufraga balearica =

Conservation status
- Critically Endangered (IUCN 3.1)

Scientific classification
- Kingdom: Plantae
- Clade: Tracheophytes
- Clade: Angiosperms
- Clade: Eudicots
- Clade: Asterids
- Order: Apiales
- Family: Apiaceae
- Subfamily: Apioideae
- Tribe: Apieae
- Genus: Naufraga; Constance & Cannon
- Species: N. balearica

Binomial name
- Naufraga balearica Constance & Cannon

Genus of flowering plants

Naufraga balearica is an extremely rare species of flowering plant in the family Apiaceae, and the only species in the genus Naufraga. It is endemic to the Spanish island of Mallorca, where it is found only at the base of cliffs at the north of the island near Pollença. A population was discovered on Corsica in 1981, but it had died out by 1983, and it is not clear whether it arrived naturally. Its natural habitats are Mediterranean-type shrubby vegetation (known as 'matorral') and rocky shores.

It was first described as a new species in 1967.

It was classified as 'critically endangered' in the IUCN Red List in 2006. In the European Union it has been designated as a 'priority species' under Annex II of the Habitats Directive since 1992, which means areas in which it occurs can be declared Special Areas of Conservation, if these areas belong to one of the number of habitats listed in Annex I of the directive.
