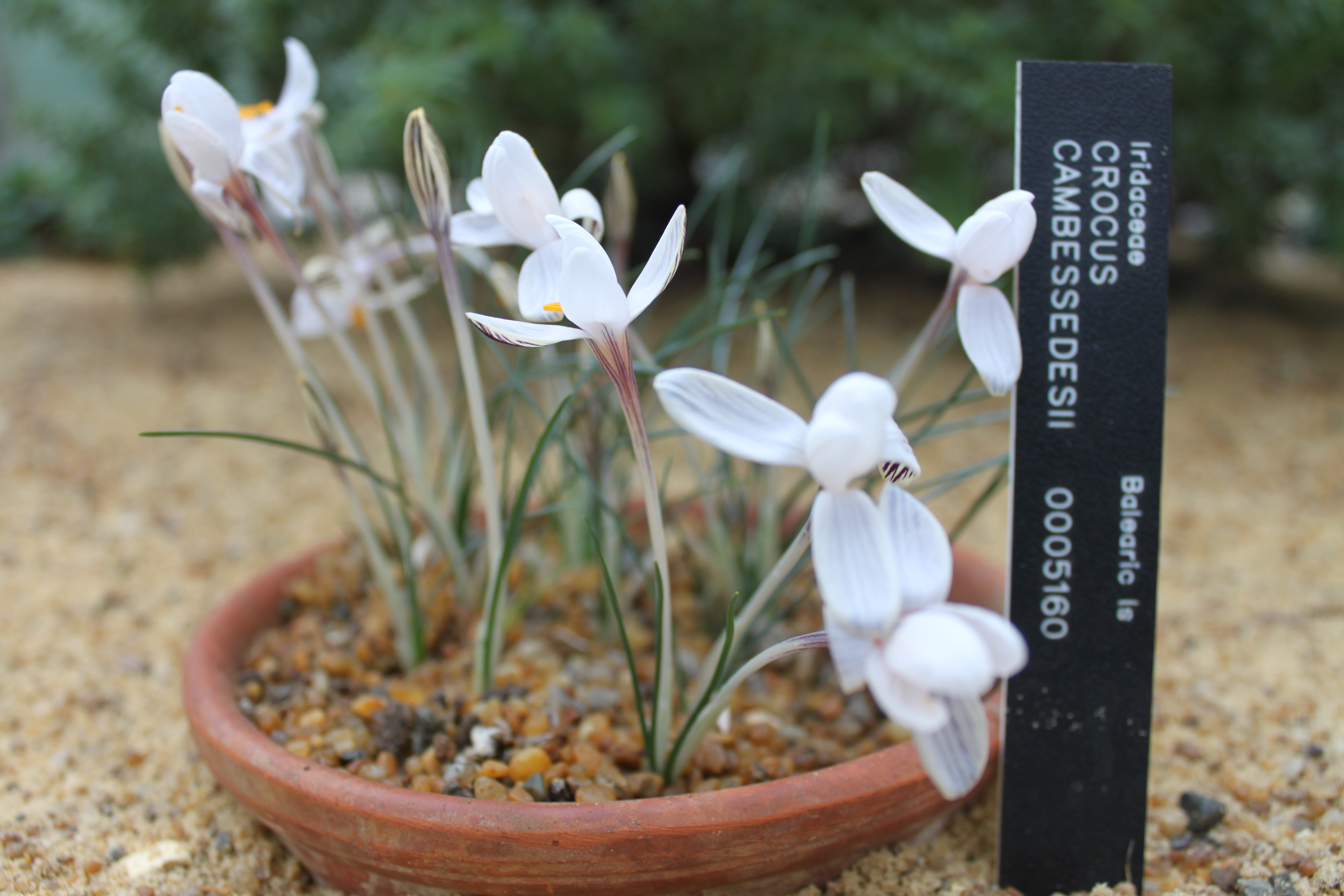

Scientific classification
- Kingdom: Plantae
- Clade: Tracheophytes
- Clade: Angiosperms
- Clade: Monocots
- Order: Asparagales
- Family: Iridaceae
- Genus: Crocus
- Species: C. cambessedesii

Binomial name
- Crocus cambessedesii J.Gay

Synonyms
- Crocus minimus subsp. cambessedesii (J.Gay) O.Bolòs, Molin. & P.Monts.; Crocus minimus f. cambessedesii (J.Gay) Knoche; Crocus cambessedesianus Herb.; Crocus cambessedesii var. magontanus (J.J.Rodr.) Nyman; Crocus magontanus J.J.Rodr.

= Crocus cambessedesii =

Species of flowering plant

Crocus cambessedesii is a species of flowering plant in the genus Crocus of the family Iridaceae. It is a cormous perennial native to Baleares (Majorca, Minorca).
