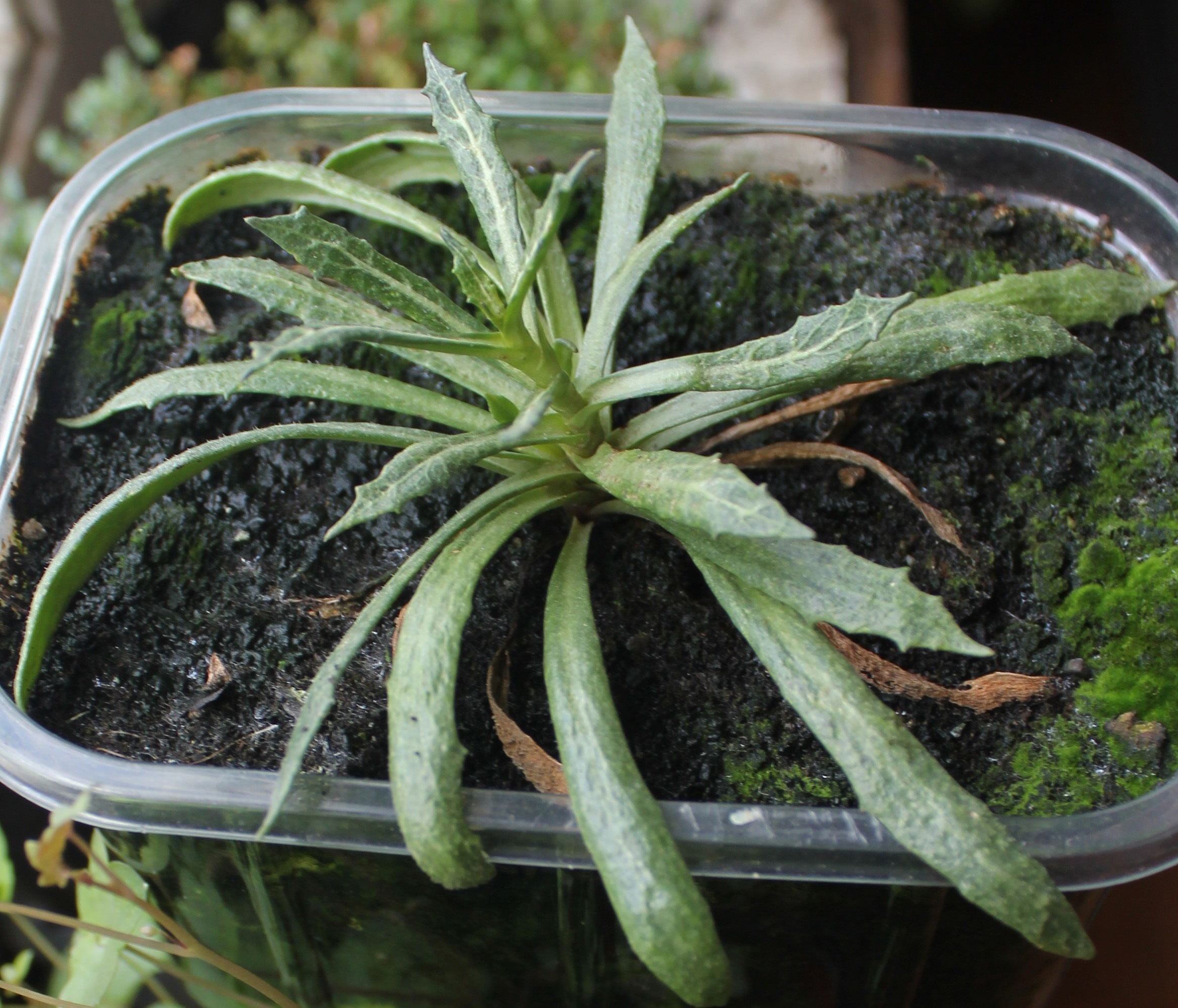

Conservation status
- Near Threatened (IUCN 3.1)

Scientific classification
- Kingdom: Plantae
- Clade: Tracheophytes
- Clade: Angiosperms
- Clade: Eudicots
- Clade: Asterids
- Order: Asterales
- Family: Asteraceae
- Subfamily: Carduoideae
- Tribe: Cardueae
- Subtribe: Centaureinae
- Genus: Femeniasia; Susanna
- Species: F. balearica

Binomial name
- Femeniasia balearica (J.J.Rodr.) Susanna

Synonyms
- Centaurea balearica J.J.Rodr.; Acosta balearica (J.J.Rodr.) Holub; Carthamus balearicus (J.J.Rodr.) Greuter; Carduncellus balearicus (J.J.Rodr.) G.López

= Femeniasia =

Genus of flowering plants

Femeniasia balearica is a species of flowering plant in the family Asteraceae, and it is the only species in the genus Femeniasia.

== Distribution and conservation ==
Femeniasia balearica is endemic to the north-western coast of Menorca, Spain. Its natural habitats are Mediterranean-type shrubby vegetation and sandy shores.

== Taxonomy ==
Femenasia balearica was first described by Juan Joaquín Rodríguez y Femenías in 1869 as a species of Centaurea. The genus Femeniasia, was erected for the species in 1987, and the genus remains monotypic.
