= Carex rorulenta =

Conservation status
- Least Concern (IUCN 3.1)

Scientific classification
- Kingdom: Plantae
- Clade: Tracheophytes
- Clade: Angiosperms
- Clade: Monocots
- Clade: Commelinids
- Order: Poales
- Family: Cyperaceae
- Genus: Carex
- Species: C. rorulenta

Binomial name
- Carex rorulenta Porta

Synonyms
- Carex halleriana subsp. rorulenta (Porta) Malag.

Species of flowering plant in the sedge family

Carex rorulenta is a species of true sedge in the family Cyperaceae, endemic to the Balearic Islands of Spain.

== Description ==
Carex rorulenta is a carpet-forming plant, distinguished from other Carex species because of its short stems and thin leaves. Leaves are dark green and pubescent. The flowers are unobtrusive, and appear at the ends of a filiform leaf-stalk. A common species, it is a hexaploid with some chromosomal irregularities.

== Distribution and habitat ==
Carex rorulenta favours muddy, shady banks, oak forests, cliffsides.
