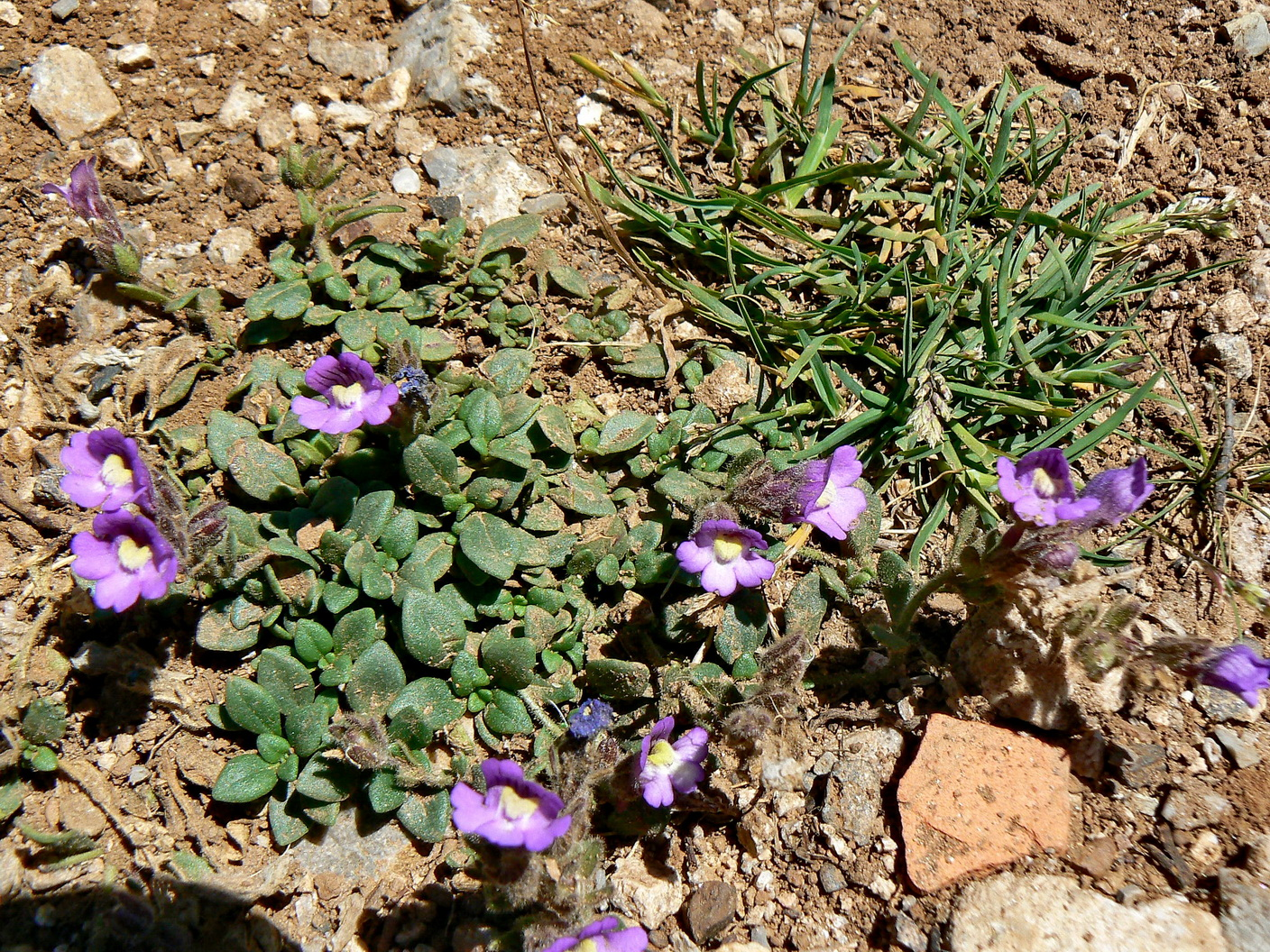

Scientific classification
- Kingdom: Plantae
- Clade: Tracheophytes
- Clade: Angiosperms
- Clade: Eudicots
- Clade: Asterids
- Order: Lamiales
- Family: Plantaginaceae
- Genus: Chaenorhinum
- Species: C. origanifolium

Binomial name
- Chaenorhinum origanifolium (L.) Kostel.

Subspecies
- Chaenorhinum origanifolium subsp. cadevallii (O.Bolòs & Vigo) M.Laínz; Chaenorhinum origanifolium subsp. crassifolium (Cav.) Rivas Goday & Borja; Chaenorhinum origanifolium subsp. origanifolium; Chaenorhinum origanifolium subsp. rodriguezii (Porta) Güemes; Chaenorhinum origanifolium subsp. segoviense (Willk.) R.Fern.

Synonyms
- Antirrhinum origanifolium L.; Linaria origanifolia (L.) Chaz.; Linaria origanifolia subsp. euoriganifolia Maire

= Chaenorhinum origanifolium =

Species of flowering plant

Chaenorhinum origanifolium is a species of flowering plant in the family Plantaginaceae. It is native to mountainous regions of southern Europe and northwestern Africa, including the Iberian Peninsula, Balearic Islands, Italy, Greece, Algeria, Morocco, and Tunisia. It grows on rocks and crevices of escarpments, usually in limestone cliffs.

== Description ==
Chaenorhinum origanifolium is a perennial herb, which reaches a size of up to 40 cm in height, non-cespitose, glabrous or glandular-pubescent in the lower third, densely glandular-pubescent in the upper part, with whitish appearance. Stems relatively thick and rigid to thin and flexuous, erect, ascending or prostrate, simple or branched from the base, purple at the base. Leaves of 4–23 × 2–13 mm, petiole 1.5–4.5 mm-, from suborbicular to oblanceolate, from acute to obtuse, attenuate in bas. Inflorescence with 2–25 flowers, lax. Flowers with pedicel of 5–30 mm −10–32 mm in fruiting-, straight, erect or erect-patent, slightly accentuating. Calyx with linear-spatulate, subacute, subequal sepals, of a purplish green, with dense glandular-pubescent indwelling on the outer face. Capsule 2.5–5.5 mm, subglobose, shorter than the calyx, with subequal, smooth, glandular-pubescent locules. Seeds of 0.5–0.9 × 0.4–0.5 mm, crested, dark brown or black; longitudinal crests, sinuous, continuous, sometimes slightly anastomose, smooth, taller than broad.

== Subspecies ==
Five subspecies are accepted.

- Chaenorhinum origanifolium subsp. cadevallii (O.Bolòs & Vigo) M.Laínz – northeastern Spain and eastern Pyrenees of Spain and France
- Chaenorhinum origanifolium subsp. crassifolium (Cav.) Rivas Goday & Borja – southern and eastern Spain and Balearic Islands
- Chaenorhinum origanifolium subsp. origanifolium – Iberia, French Pyrenees, Italy, Greece, and northwestern Africa
- Chaenorhinum origanifolium subsp. rodriguezii (Porta) Güemes – Balearic Islands
- Chaenorhinum origanifolium subsp. segoviense (Willk.) R.Fern. – central Spain
