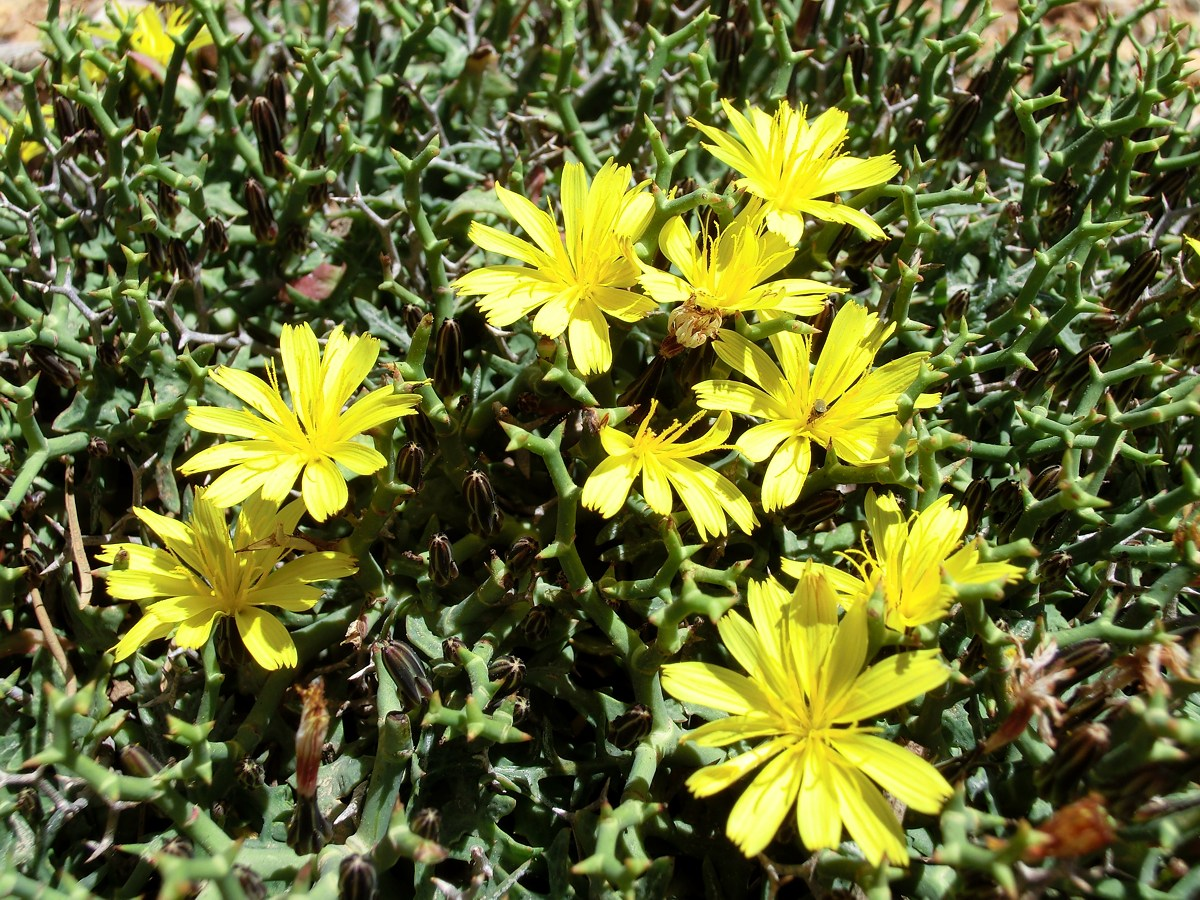
- Flowers
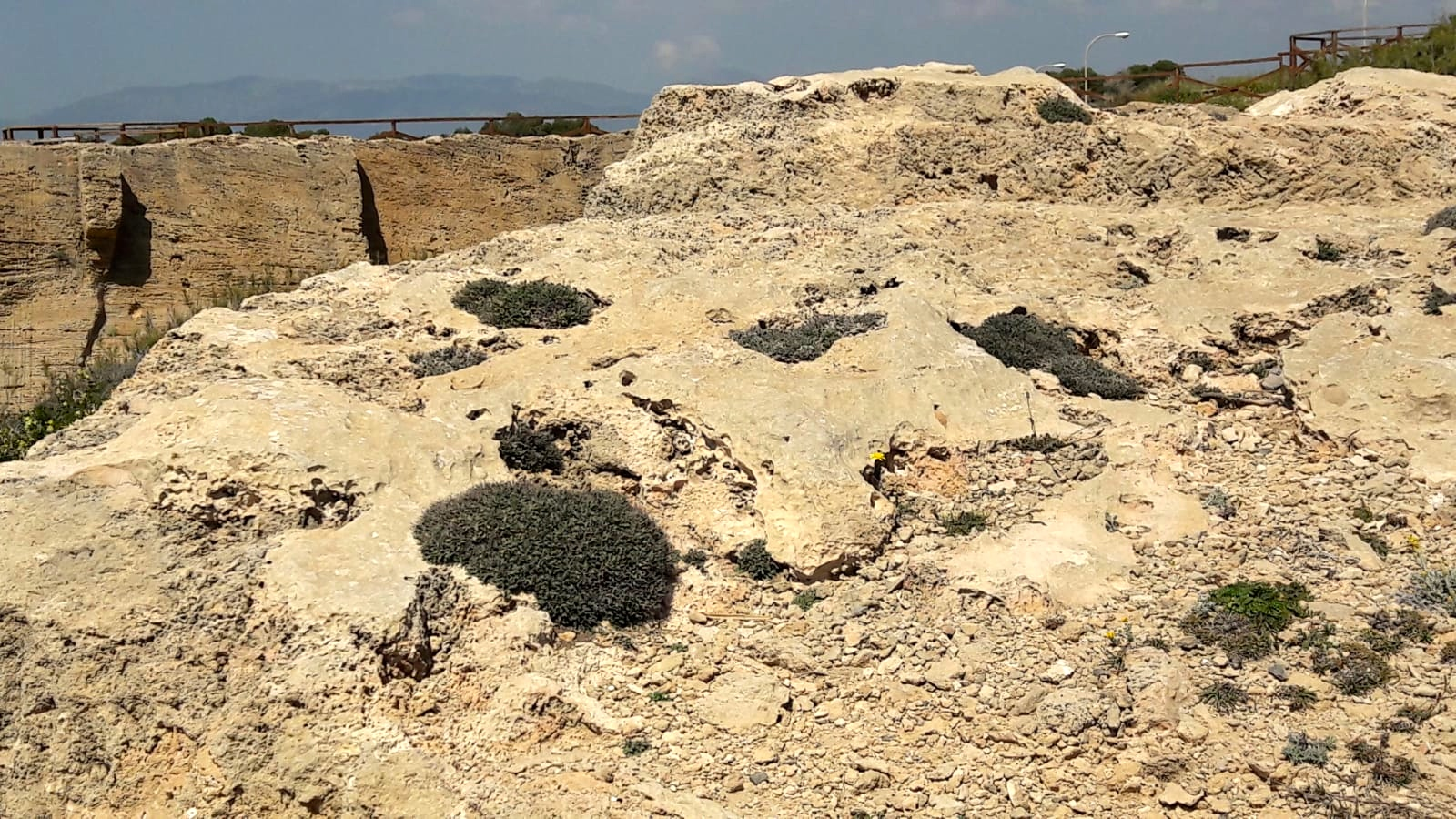
- Habitat

Scientific classification
- Kingdom: Plantae
- Clade: Tracheophytes
- Clade: Angiosperms
- Clade: Eudicots
- Clade: Asterids
- Order: Asterales
- Family: Asteraceae
- Genus: Launaea
- Species: L. cervicornis

Binomial name
- Launaea cervicornis (Boiss.) Font Quer & Rothm.

Synonyms
- Prenanthes cervicornis Boiss.; Sonchus cervicornis Nyman; Sonchus spinosus var. cervicornis (Boiss.) Lange

= Launaea cervicornis =

Species of plant

Launaea cervicornis is a species of flowering plant in the family Asteraceae, native to the Balearic Islands. It is found exclusively in coastal shrublands, where it is a keystone species.

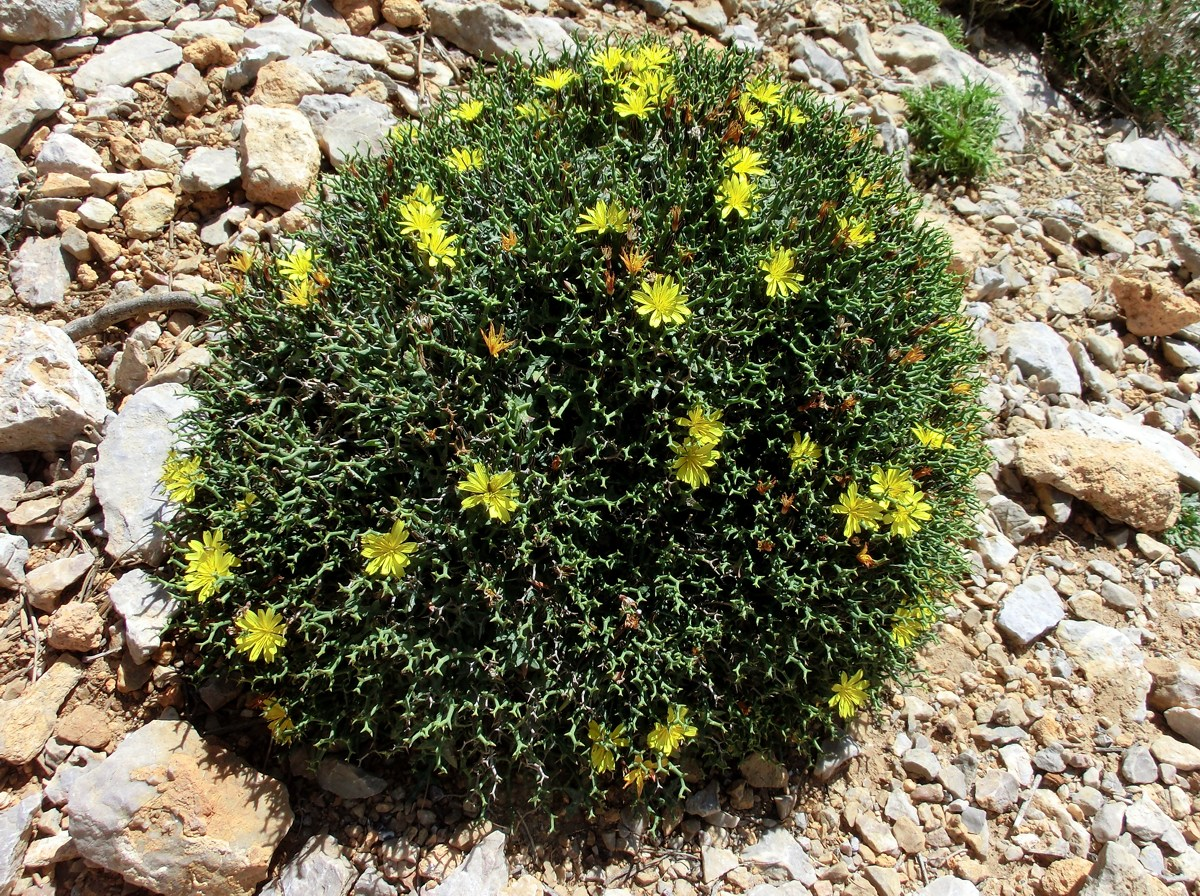
Habit
