= Spiroceratium =

Scientific classification
- Kingdom: Plantae
- Clade: Tracheophytes
- Clade: Angiosperms
- Clade: Eudicots
- Clade: Asterids
- Order: Apiales
- Family: Apiaceae
- Genus: Spiroceratium; H.Wolff
- Species: S. bicknellii

Binomial name
- Spiroceratium bicknellii (Briq.) H.Wolff

Genus of plants

Spiroceratium is a monotypic genus of flowering plants belonging to the family Apiaceae. The only species is Spiroceratium bicknellii.

The species is found in the Balearic Islands.
