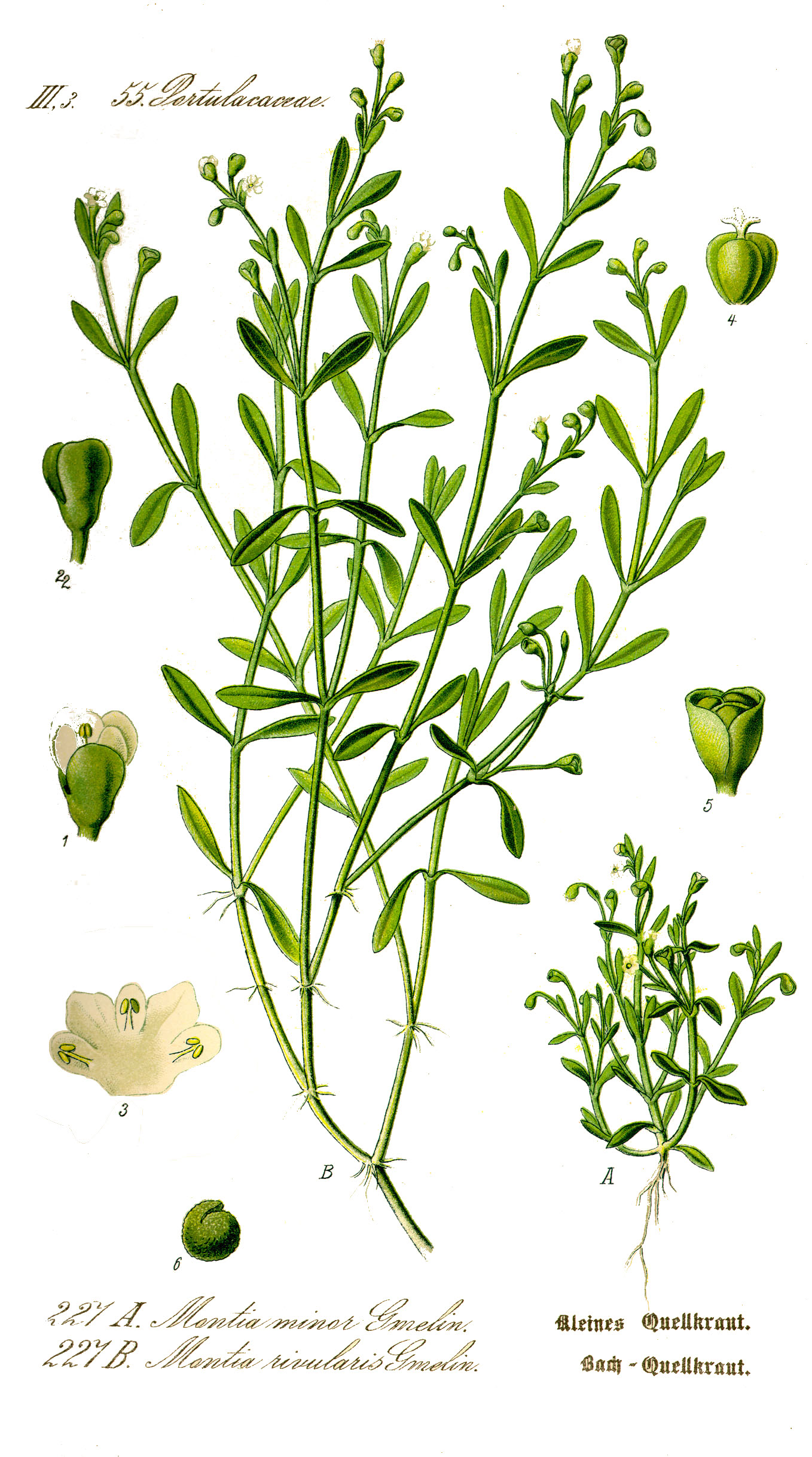
- Botanical illustration

Scientific classification
- Kingdom: Plantae
- Clade: Tracheophytes
- Clade: Angiosperms
- Clade: Eudicots
- Order: Caryophyllales
- Family: Caryophyllaceae
- Genus: Polycarpon
- Species: P. polycarpoides

Binomial name
- Polycarpon polycarpoides (Biv.) Zodda

Synonyms
- List: Arenaria peploides Lapeyr.; Hagaea polycarpoides Biv.; Lahaya polycarpoides (Biv.) Schult.; Mollia polycarpoides (Biv.) Guss.; Mollia polycarpon Spreng.; Polycarpon bivonae J.Gay; Polycarpon colomense Porta; Polycarpon cupanii Bubani; Polycarpon latifolium Bertol.; Polycarpon peploides DC.; Polycarpon tetraphyllum subsp. catalaunicum (O.Bolòs & Vigo) Iamonico & Domina; Polycarpon tetraphyllum subsp. colomense (Porta) Iamonico & Domina; Polycarpon tetraphyllum subsp. polycarpoides (Biv.) Iamonico

= Polycarpon polycarpoides =

Species of flowering plant

Polycarpon polycarpoides is a species of flowering plant in the manyseed genus Polycarpon, family Caryophyllaceae, native to the western Mediterranean; Morocco, Algeria, Tunisia, Spain, the Balearic Islands, France, Italy, and Sicily. It is a member of the Polycarpon tetraphyllum species aggregate.

== Subtaxa ==
The following subspecies are accepted:

- Polycarpon polycarpoides subsp. catalaunicum O.Bolòs & Vigo – Spain, Algeria, Tunisia
- Polycarpon polycarpoides subsp. colomense (Porta) Pedrol – Balearic Islands
- Polycarpon polycarpoides subsp. polycarpoides
