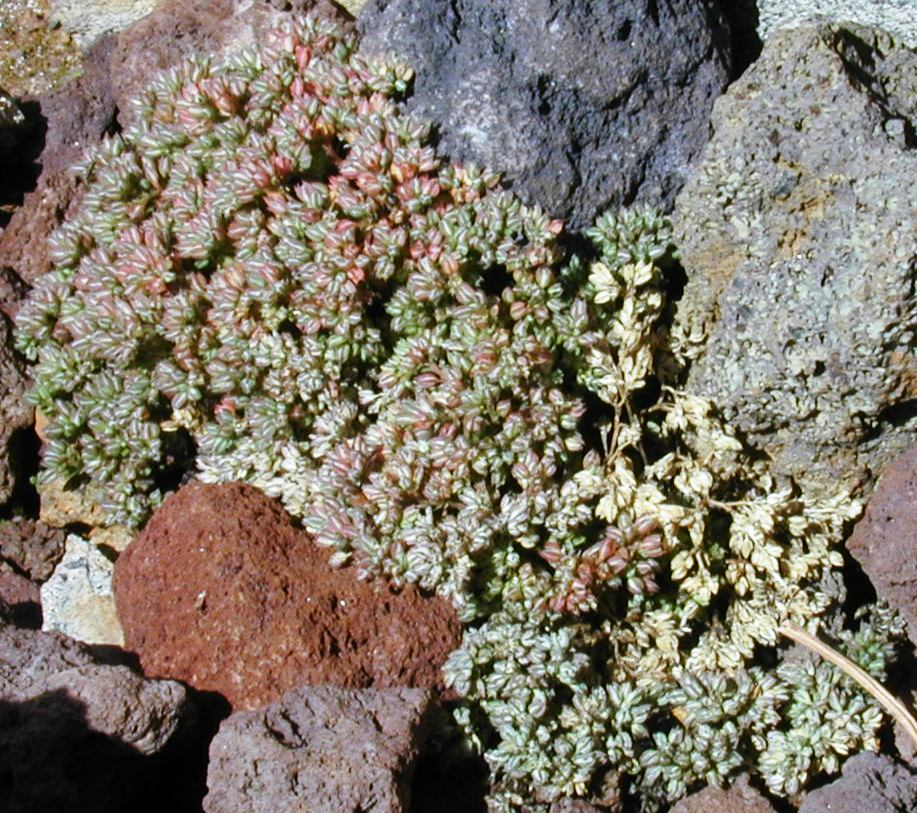

Scientific classification
- Kingdom: Plantae
- Clade: Tracheophytes
- Clade: Angiosperms
- Clade: Eudicots
- Order: Caryophyllales
- Family: Caryophyllaceae
- Genus: Polycarpon
- Species: P. tetraphyllum

Binomial name
- Polycarpon tetraphyllum L.

Subspecies
- 5; see text

Synonyms
- List: Alsine polycarpa Crantz; Alsine succulenta Delile; Arenaria succulenta Ser.; Arversia loeflingiae (Wall. ex Wight & Arn.) Walp.; Hapalosia loeflingiae Wall. ex Wight & Arn.; Herniaria alsinifolia (L.) Mill.; Holosteum tetraphyllum (L.) Thunb.; Illecebrum alsinifolium Comm. ex Poir.; Illecebrum alsinifolium L.; Illecebrum frutescens Comm. ex Schult.; Illecebrum striatum Pers.; Lahaya memphitica Schult.; Loeflingia caspica S.G.Gmel.; Loeflingia indica Retz.; Mollugo tetraphylla L.; Paronychia alsinifolia (L.) Juss.; Paronychia striata DC.; Polycarpaea alsinifolia (L.) C.Mohr; Polycarpaea benthamii Wall.; Polycarpaea depressa DC.; Polycarpaea lanuginosa Wall.; Polycarpaea tetraphylla (L.) E.H.L.Krause; Polycarpon benthamii Hook.f. & Edgew.; Polycarpon brachypetalum Gagnep.; Polycarpon depressum Edgew. & Hook.f.; Polycarpon diphyllum Cav.; Polycarpon dunense P.Fraga & Rosselló; Polycarpon floribundum Willk.; Polycarpon indicum (Retz.) Merr.; Polycarpon lanuginosum Edgew. & Hook.f.; Polycarpon loeflingiae (Wall. ex Wight & Arn.) Benth. & Hook.f.; Polycarpon loeflingiae var. genuinum Briq.; Polycarpon polyphyllum Blanco; Polycarpon sauvagei Mathez; Polycarpon succulentum Webb & Berthel.; Polycarpon tetraphyllum f. depauperatum (Merino) Amich; Polycarpon tetraphyllum f. ovalifolium (Merino) Amich; Polycarpon tetraphyllum var. diphyllum (Cav.) Romo; Polycarpon tetraphyllum var. fontqueri O.Bolòs & Vigo; Spergula succulenta D.Dietr.; Spergularia succulenta (Delile) G.Don

= Polycarpon tetraphyllum =

Species of flowering plant

Polycarpon tetraphyllum, commonly known as four-leaved allseed (also fourleaf allseed or fourleaf manyseed), is a plant of the family Caryophyllaceae. An annual herb growing to 15 cm in height, it is found on sandy soils, in coastal areas and on wasteland. Native to Europe, it is also naturalised in parts of North America, Australia and elsewhere. It is rare in Britain, except in the Scilly Isles.

== Description ==
Polycarpon tetraphyllum is a prostrate, herbaceous, annual plant. The stems produce many branches, and leaves are obovate and glabrous.

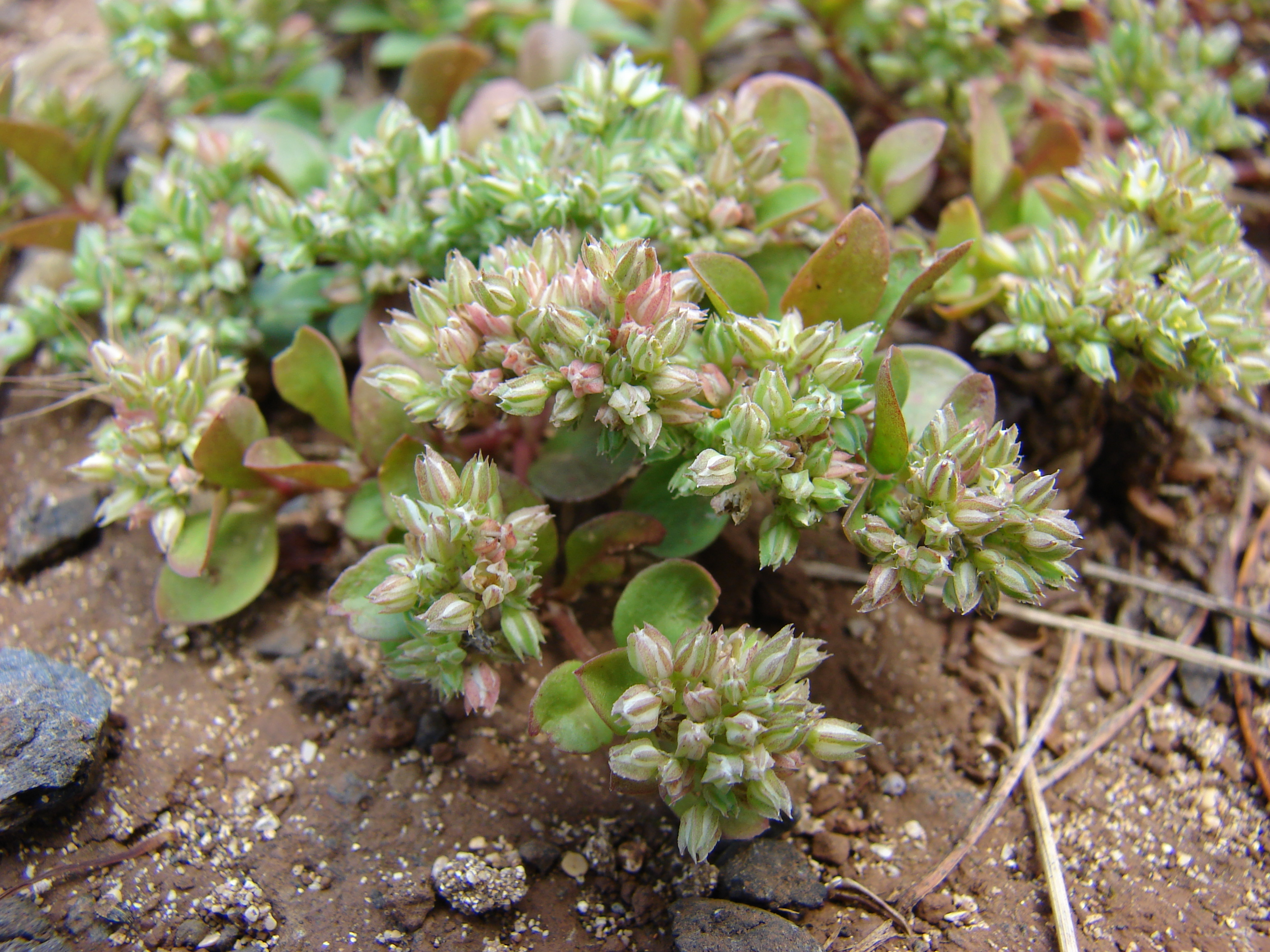
Polycarpon tetraphyllum (flowers). Location: Maui, Makawao

The inflorescence consists of loose clusters of many small flowers at the end of each stem. The seeds are rounded and 0.4 - 0.5 mm long.

== Distribution and habitat ==
Polycarpon tetraphyllum is native to Southern Europe, Great Britain, the Mediterranean region, the middle east, the Indian subcontinent, and parts of tropical South America. It has been introduced to the Americas, Australia, New Zealand, and Southeast Asia.

The plant tends to grow in disturbed, shady areas. It is commonly found as a weed growing in crevices in roads, gardens, and fields.

== Subspecies ==
Five subspecies are accepted.

- Polycarpon tetraphyllum subsp. apurense (Kunth) Iamonico & C.A.Zanotti – eastern Colombia and Venezuela, Paraguay and northeastern Argentina
- Polycarpon tetraphyllum subsp. diphyllum (Cav.) O.Bolòs & Font Quer – Mediterranean basin, Canary Islands, and Madeira
- Polycarpon tetraphyllum subsp. dunense (P.Fraga & Rosselló) Iamonico – Balearic Islands (northern Menorca)
- Polycarpon tetraphyllum subsp. sauvagei (Mathez) Iamonico – Morocco
- Polycarpon tetraphyllum subsp. tetraphyllum – Great Britain, Germany, southern Europe, North Africa, northeastern tropical Africa, Western Asia, Arabian Peninsula, India, and Sri Lanka

== Uses ==
=== Composition ===
Phenolic compounds found in aerial parts of the species are acetohydroxamic acid, catechin hydrate, resveratrol, fumaric acid, 4-hydroxycinnamic acid, 4-hydroxybenzoic acid, oleuropein, ellagic acid, quercetin, butein and luteolin.

=== Possible medicinal uses ===
Extracts of the plant shows a potential to protect from free radicals. Its capability as an antioxidant is however slightly lower than the one of Vitamin C. It furthermore showed antibiotic, antifungal and antiproliferative properties.
