= Tessellata =

Tessellata is a common name for the fiddleneck Amsinckia tessellata. It is derived from the same Latin word to engender tesselate.

Tessellata appears in the scientific nomenclature for many other species as well, including:

== Bryozoans ==
- Schizoretepora tessellata

== Fungi ==
- Hormosphaeria tessellata

=== Lichens ===
- Lecidea tessellata
- Mastodia tessellata
- Pseudopaulia tessellata

== Plants ==
- Acacia tessellata, a shrub
- Allocasuarina tessellata, a dicotyledonous flowering plant
- Arbutus tessellata, a heath
- Bergbambos tessellata, a bamboo
- Carex tessellata, a sedge now synonymized with Carex acutata
- Haworthiopsis tessellata, a monocot
- Notechidnopsis tessellata, a dogbane

=== Orchids ===
- Caladenia tessellata
- Vanda tessellata

== Animals ==
=== Crabs ===
- Lybia tessellata

=== Mollusks ===
- Alvania_tessellata
- Aphera tessellata
- Aspilapteryx tessellata
- Cassis tessellata
- Cryptogemma tessellata
- Fenimorea tessellata
- Halgerda tessellata
- Kermia tessellata (synonymous to Clathurella tessellata)
- Mumiola tesselata
- Nerita tessellata
- Oliva tessellata
- Partulina tessellata
- Pupa tessellata
- Terebra tessellata
- Tonna tessellata

=== Insects ===
==== Butterflies ====
- Niphanda tessellata
- Plastingia tessellata

==== Moths ====
- Auratonota tessellata
- Calligraphidia tessellata
- Eois tessellata
- Eugoa tessellata
- Euxoa tessellata
- Hypercompe tessellata
- Langsdorfia tessellata
- Littoraria tessellata
- Ochrodota tessellata
- Salagena tessellata
- Scolecocampa tessellata
- Sparganopseustis tessellata
- Stamnodes tessellata
- Symphlebia tessellata

==== Other insects ====
- Campiglossa tessellata, a fruit fly
- Chetogena tessellata, a parasitic fly
- Decimiana tessellata, a praying mantis
- Empis tessellata, a dance fly
- Nusalala tessellata, a lacewing
- Pithodia tessellata, a longhorn beetle
- Tetratoma tessellata, a polypore fungus beetle
- Tessellana tessellata, a cricket

=== Spiders ===
- Leucauge tessellata

=== Vertebrates ===
- Natrix tessellata, a snake
- Notothenia tessellata, a ray-finned fish
- Nucras tessellata, a lizard
- Trachylepis tessellata, a skink

== See also ==
- Tessellana, a genus of brush crickets
