= Aspilapteryx multipunctella =

Scientific classification
- Domain: Eukaryota
- Kingdom: Animalia
- Phylum: Arthropoda
- Class: Insecta
- Order: Lepidoptera
- Family: Gracillariidae
- Genus: Aspilapteryx
- Species: A. multipunctella

Binomial name
- Aspilapteryx multipunctella Chrétien, 1917

Species of moth

Aspilapteryx multipunctella is a moth of the family Gracillariidae. It is known from Spain and the Canary Islands.

The larvae feed on Plantago albicans and Plantago arborescens. They mine the leaves of their host plant.
