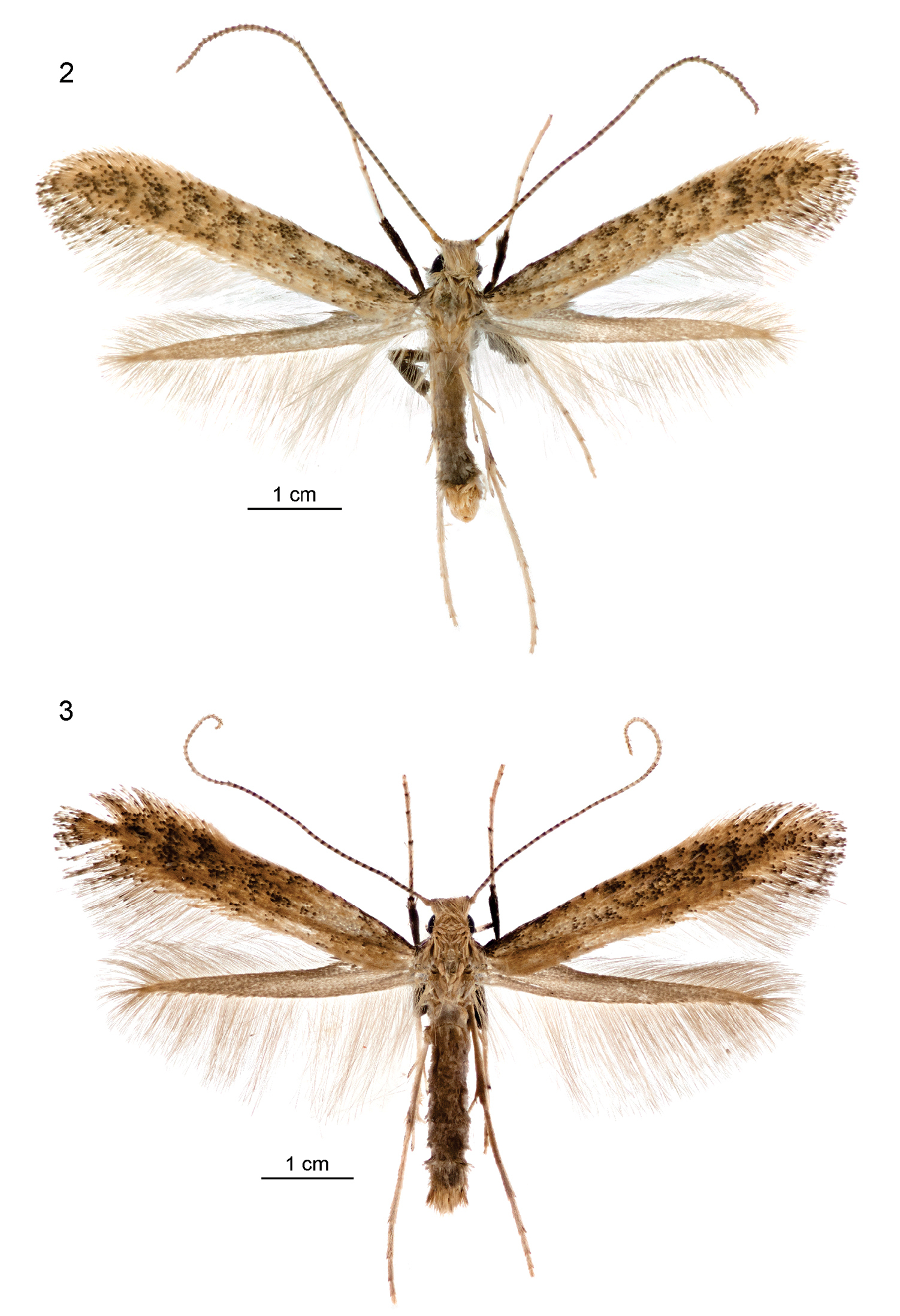

Scientific classification
- Kingdom: Animalia
- Phylum: Arthropoda
- Clade: Pancrustacea
- Class: Insecta
- Order: Lepidoptera
- Family: Gracillariidae
- Genus: Sabulopteryx
- Species: S. botanica

Binomial name
- Sabulopteryx botanica Hoare & Patrick, 2019

= Sabulopteryx botanica =

Species of moth endemic to New Zealand

Sabulopteryx botanica is a species of moth in the family Gracillariidae. It is endemic to New Zealand. It was first described in 2019 by Robert Hoare and Brian Patrick. The larval host of this species is Teucrium parvifolium, a plant that has been classified as at risk by the Department of Conservation.
