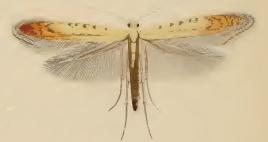

Scientific classification
- Domain: Eukaryota
- Kingdom: Animalia
- Phylum: Arthropoda
- Class: Insecta
- Order: Lepidoptera
- Family: Gracillariidae
- Genus: Aspilapteryx
- Species: A. limosella

Binomial name
- Aspilapteryx limosella (Duponchel, 1843)

Synonyms
- Ornix limosella Duponchel, 1843

= Aspilapteryx limosella =

Species of moth

Aspilapteryx limosella is a moth of the family Gracillariidae. It is found from Germany and Poland to the Iberian Peninsula, Italy and Greece. It is also found in central and southern Russia.

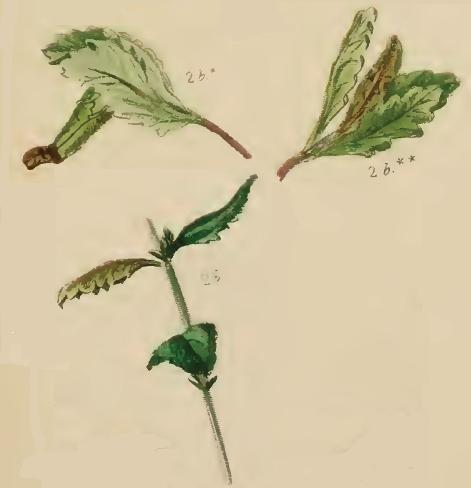
Sprigs of Teucrium chamaedrys with mined leaves (2b, 2b* and 2b**)

Larva

The larvae feed on Teucrium chamaedrys, Teucrium montanum and Jurinia cyanoides. They mine the leaves of their host plant.
