= Fulvocompe =

Scientific classification
- Kingdom: Animalia
- Phylum: Arthropoda
- Clade: Pancrustacea
- Class: Insecta
- Order: Lepidoptera
- Superfamily: Noctuoidea
- Family: Erebidae
- Subfamily: Arctiinae
- Subtribe: Spilosomina
- Genus: Fulvocompe; Laguerre, 2023

Type species
- Turuptiana ockendeni Rothschild, 1909

Genus of moths

Fulvocompe is a genus of tiger moths in the family Erebidae that was erected by Michel Laguerre in 2023. Many of the species in the genus were split from the genus Hypercompe.

== Taxonomy ==
The following species are recognised in the genus Fulvocompe:

- Fulvocompe bahiaensis (Laguerre, 2019)
- Fulvocompe beckeri (Watson & Goodger, 1986)
- Fulvocompe bricenoi (Rothschild, 1909)
- Fulvocompe dissimilis (Schaus, 1896)
- Fulvocompe guatemalensis Laguerre, 2023
- Fulvocompe lemairei (Watson & Goodger, 1986)
- Fulvocompe marcescens (Felder & Rogenhofer, 1874)
- Fulvocompe nemophila (Herrich-Schäffer, [1853])
- Fulvocompe neurophylla (Walker, 1856)
- Fulvocompe obscura (Schaus, 1901)
- Fulvocompe ockendeni (Rothschild, 1909)
- Fulvocompe tessellata (Druce, 1906)
