= Tessellana lagrecai =

Conservation status
- Vulnerable (IUCN 3.1)

Scientific classification
- Kingdom: Animalia
- Phylum: Arthropoda
- Class: Insecta
- Order: Orthoptera
- Suborder: Ensifera
- Family: Tettigoniidae
- Genus: Tessellana
- Species: T. lagrecai

Binomial name
- Tessellana lagrecai Messina, 1979

Species of cricket-like animal

Tessellana lagrecai, known as La Greca's slender bush-cricket, is a species of bush-cricket in the family Tettigoniidae. Described by Messina in 1979, the species is found in grasslands and shrublands in Sicily, Italy. It is considered a vulnerable species by the IUCN.
