= Sparganopseustis geminorum =

Scientific classification
- Kingdom: Animalia
- Phylum: Arthropoda
- Clade: Pancrustacea
- Class: Insecta
- Order: Lepidoptera
- Family: Tortricidae
- Genus: Sparganopseustis
- Species: S. geminorum

Binomial name
- Sparganopseustis geminorum (Meyrick, 1932)

Synonyms
- Sparganothis geminorum Meyrick, 1932

Species of moth

Sparganopseustis geminorum is a species of moth of the family Tortricidae. It is found in Costa Rica.
