= Sparganopseustis garlaczi =

Scientific classification
- Kingdom: Animalia
- Phylum: Arthropoda
- Clade: Pancrustacea
- Class: Insecta
- Order: Lepidoptera
- Family: Tortricidae
- Genus: Sparganopseustis
- Species: S. garlaczi

Binomial name
- Sparganopseustis garlaczi Razowski & Wojtusiak, 2008

Species of moth

Sparganopseustis garlaczi is a species of moth of the family Tortricidae. It is found in Cotopaxi Province, Ecuador.

The wingspan is 26 mm.

== Etymology ==
The species is named in honour of Dr. Rafał Garlacz who collected the species.
