= Aspilapteryx filifera =

Scientific classification
- Kingdom: Animalia
- Phylum: Arthropoda
- Class: Insecta
- Order: Lepidoptera
- Family: Gracillariidae
- Genus: Aspilapteryx
- Species: A. filifera

Binomial name
- Aspilapteryx filifera (Meyrick, 1912)

Synonyms
- Gracilaria filifera Meyrick, 1912

Species of moth

Aspilapteryx filifera is a moth of the family Gracillariidae. It is known from Namibia and South Africa.
