= Ochrodota pronapides =

Scientific classification
- Domain: Eukaryota
- Kingdom: Animalia
- Phylum: Arthropoda
- Class: Insecta
- Order: Lepidoptera
- Superfamily: Noctuoidea
- Family: Erebidae
- Subfamily: Arctiinae
- Genus: Ochrodota
- Species: O. pronapides

Binomial name
- Ochrodota pronapides (H. Druce, 1894)

Synonyms
- Zatrephes pronapides H. Druce, 1894; Ochrodota pronapides major Rothschild, 1910

Species of moth

Ochrodota pronapides is a moth of the subfamily Arctiinae first described by Herbert Druce in 1894. It is found in Panama, Suriname, Ecuador and Amazonas.
