= Sparganopseustis elimata =

Scientific classification
- Kingdom: Animalia
- Phylum: Arthropoda
- Clade: Pancrustacea
- Class: Insecta
- Order: Lepidoptera
- Family: Tortricidae
- Genus: Sparganopseustis
- Species: S. elimata

Binomial name
- Sparganopseustis elimata (Meyrick, 1930)

Synonyms
- Sparganothis elimata Meyrick, 1930

Species of moth

Sparganopseustis elimata is a species of moth of the family Tortricidae. It is found in Ecuador.
