= Sparganopseustis flavicirrata =

Scientific classification
- Kingdom: Animalia
- Phylum: Arthropoda
- Clade: Pancrustacea
- Class: Insecta
- Order: Lepidoptera
- Family: Tortricidae
- Genus: Sparganopseustis
- Species: S. flavicirrata

Binomial name
- Sparganopseustis flavicirrata (Walsingham, 1914)

Synonyms
- Ctenopseustis flavicirrata Walsingham, 1914

Species of moth

Sparganopseustis flavicirrata is a species of moth of the family Tortricidae. It is found in Veracruz, Mexico.
