= Aspilapteryx pentaplaca =

Scientific classification
- Kingdom: Animalia
- Phylum: Arthropoda
- Class: Insecta
- Order: Lepidoptera
- Family: Gracillariidae
- Genus: Aspilapteryx
- Species: A. pentaplaca

Binomial name
- Aspilapteryx pentaplaca (Meyrick, 1911)

Synonyms
- Acrocercops pentaplaca Meyrick, 1911; Caloptilia pentaplaca (Meyrick, 1911)

Species of moth

Aspilapteryx pentaplaca is a moth of the family Gracillariidae. It is known from Sub-Saharan Africa (Namibia, Nigeria, and South Africa), from the Seychelles, and from the Mascarene Islands (Réunion, Mauritius).
