= Fulvocompe marcescens =

Scientific classification
- Kingdom: Animalia
- Phylum: Arthropoda
- Clade: Pancrustacea
- Class: Insecta
- Order: Lepidoptera
- Superfamily: Noctuoidea
- Family: Erebidae
- Subfamily: Arctiinae
- Genus: Fulvocompe
- Species: F. marcescens

Binomial name
- Fulvocompe marcescens (Felder & Rogenhofer, 1874)

Synonyms
- Agaposoma marcescens Felder, 1874; Hypercompe marcescens (Felder, 1874)

Species of moth

Fulvocompe marcescens is a species of moth in the family Erebidae that was first described by Felder and Rogenhofer in 1874. It is found in Brazil (Amazonas) and Ecuador.
