= Aspilapteryx spectabilis =

Scientific classification
- Kingdom: Animalia
- Phylum: Arthropoda
- Clade: Pancrustacea
- Class: Insecta
- Order: Lepidoptera
- Family: Gracillariidae
- Genus: Aspilapteryx
- Species: A. spectabilis

Binomial name
- Aspilapteryx spectabilis Huemer, 1994

Species of moth

Aspilapteryx spectabilis is a moth of the family Gracillariidae. It is known from Tyrol in western Austria, where it can be found at altitudes between 2,200 and 2,500 meters.

The larvae probably feed on plantago aristata. They probably mine the leaves of their host plant.
