= Fulvocompe dissimilis =

Scientific classification
- Kingdom: Animalia
- Phylum: Arthropoda
- Clade: Pancrustacea
- Class: Insecta
- Order: Lepidoptera
- Superfamily: Noctuoidea
- Family: Erebidae
- Subfamily: Arctiinae
- Genus: Fulvocompe
- Species: F. dissimilis

Binomial name
- Fulvocompe dissimilis (Schaus, 1896)

Synonyms
- Chaetoloma dissimilis Schaus, 1896; Hypercompe dissimilis (Schaus, 1896)

Species of moth in the family Erebidae

Fulvocompe dissimilis is a species of moth in the family Erebidae that was first described by William Schaus in 1896. It is found in Colombia.
