= Sparganopseustis myrota =

Scientific classification
- Kingdom: Animalia
- Phylum: Arthropoda
- Clade: Pancrustacea
- Class: Insecta
- Order: Lepidoptera
- Family: Tortricidae
- Genus: Sparganopseustis
- Species: S. myrota

Binomial name
- Sparganopseustis myrota Meyrick, 1912

Species of moth

Sparganopseustis myrota is a species of moth of the family Tortricidae. It is found in Colombia and Carchi Province, Ecuador.
