= Fulvocompe beckeri =

Scientific classification
- Kingdom: Animalia
- Phylum: Arthropoda
- Clade: Pancrustacea
- Class: Insecta
- Order: Lepidoptera
- Superfamily: Noctuoidea
- Family: Erebidae
- Subfamily: Arctiinae
- Genus: Fulvocompe
- Species: F. beckeri

Binomial name
- Fulvocompe beckeri Watson & Goodger, 1986

Synonyms
- Turuptiana steinbachi Rothschild, 1917; Hypercompe beckeri Watson & Goodger, 1986

Species of moth

Fulvocompe beckeri is a species of moth in the family Erebidae that was first described by Watson and Goodger in 1986. It is found in Argentina.
