= Sparganopseustis aurolimbana =

Scientific classification
- Kingdom: Animalia
- Phylum: Arthropoda
- Clade: Pancrustacea
- Class: Insecta
- Order: Lepidoptera
- Family: Tortricidae
- Genus: Sparganopseustis
- Species: S. aurolimbana

Binomial name
- Sparganopseustis aurolimbana (Zeller, 1866)

Synonyms
- Teras aurolimbana Zeller, 1866

Species of moth

Sparganopseustis aurolimbana is a species of moth of the family Tortricidae. It is found in Colombia.
