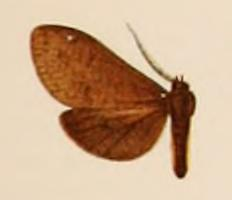
- Ochrodota funebris

Scientific classification
- Kingdom: Animalia
- Phylum: Arthropoda
- Class: Insecta
- Order: Lepidoptera
- Superfamily: Noctuoidea
- Family: Erebidae
- Subfamily: Arctiinae
- Tribe: Arctiini
- Subtribe: Phaegopterina
- Genus: Ochrodota; Hampson, 1901

= Ochrodota =

Genus of moths

Ochrodota is a genus of moths in the family Erebidae.

== Species ==
- Ochrodota affinis
- Ochrodota atra
- Ochrodota brunnescens
- Ochrodota constellata
- Ochrodota funebris
- Ochrodota grisescens
- Ochrodota marina
- Ochrodota pronapides
- Ochrodota similis
- Ochrodota tessellata
