= Aphera lindae =

Scientific classification
- Kingdom: Animalia
- Phylum: Mollusca
- Class: Gastropoda
- Subclass: Caenogastropoda
- Order: Neogastropoda
- Family: Cancellariidae
- Genus: Aphera
- Species: A. lindae

Binomial name
- Aphera lindae Petuch, 1987

Species of gastropod

Aphera lindae is a species of sea snail, a marine gastropod mollusk in the family Cancellariidae, the nutmeg snails.

== Description ==
Original description: "Shell solid, thickened, oval-elliptical in shape, shiny; entire shell surface covered with numerous fine axial ribs and numerous fine spiral cords; axial ribs and spiral cords of equal size, intersecting to produce finely cancellate sculpture; columella wide, reflected onto body whorl as polished enameled area; columella with 2 large, equal-sized plications; edge of lip crenulated; interior of aperture with 15 lirae which disappear farther inside; color pure white with single large pale tan patch on dorsum; interior of aperture and columella white."

== Distribution ==
Locus typicus: "Golfo de Triste, off Puerto Cabello, Venezuela."
