= Sparganopseustis unipunctata =

Scientific classification
- Kingdom: Animalia
- Phylum: Arthropoda
- Clade: Pancrustacea
- Class: Insecta
- Order: Lepidoptera
- Family: Tortricidae
- Genus: Sparganopseustis
- Species: S. unipunctata

Binomial name
- Sparganopseustis unipunctata (Walsingham, 1914)

Synonyms
- Ctenopseustis unipunctata Walsingham, 1914

Species of moth

Sparganopseustis unipunctata is a species of moth of the family Tortricidae. It is found in Guatemala.
