= Aphera islacolonis =

Scientific classification
- Kingdom: Animalia
- Phylum: Mollusca
- Class: Gastropoda
- Subclass: Caenogastropoda
- Order: Neogastropoda
- Family: Cancellariidae
- Genus: Aphera
- Species: A. islacolonis

Binomial name
- Aphera islacolonis (Maury, 1917)

Species of gastropod

Aphera islacolonis is a species of sea snail, a marine gastropod mollusk in the family Cancellariidae, the nutmeg snails.
