= Ochrodota grisescens =

Scientific classification
- Kingdom: Animalia
- Phylum: Arthropoda
- Class: Insecta
- Order: Lepidoptera
- Superfamily: Noctuoidea
- Family: Erebidae
- Subfamily: Arctiinae
- Genus: Ochrodota
- Species: O. grisescens

Binomial name
- Ochrodota grisescens Toulgoët, 1999

Species of moth

Ochrodota grisescens is a moth of the subfamily Arctiinae first described by Hervé de Toulgoët in 1999. It is found in French Guiana.
