= Sparganopseustis martinana =

Scientific classification
- Kingdom: Animalia
- Phylum: Arthropoda
- Clade: Pancrustacea
- Class: Insecta
- Order: Lepidoptera
- Family: Tortricidae
- Genus: Sparganopseustis
- Species: S. martinana

Binomial name
- Sparganopseustis martinana Powell, 1986

Species of moth

Sparganopseustis martinana is a species of moth of the family Tortricidae. It is found in Durango, Mexico.
