= Ochrodota atra =

Scientific classification
- Domain: Eukaryota
- Kingdom: Animalia
- Phylum: Arthropoda
- Class: Insecta
- Order: Lepidoptera
- Superfamily: Noctuoidea
- Family: Erebidae
- Subfamily: Arctiinae
- Genus: Ochrodota
- Species: O. atra

Binomial name
- Ochrodota atra Rothschild, 1909

Species of moth

Ochrodota atra is a moth of the subfamily Arctiinae first described by Rothschild in 1909. It is found in Peru.
