= Sparganopseustis flaviciliana =

Scientific classification
- Kingdom: Animalia
- Phylum: Arthropoda
- Clade: Pancrustacea
- Class: Insecta
- Order: Lepidoptera
- Family: Tortricidae
- Genus: Sparganopseustis
- Species: S. flaviciliana

Binomial name
- Sparganopseustis flaviciliana (Walsingham, 1913)

Synonyms
- Epagoge flaviciliana Walsingham, 1913

Species of moth

Sparganopseustis flaviciliana is a species of moth of the family Tortricidae. It is found in Costa Rica.
