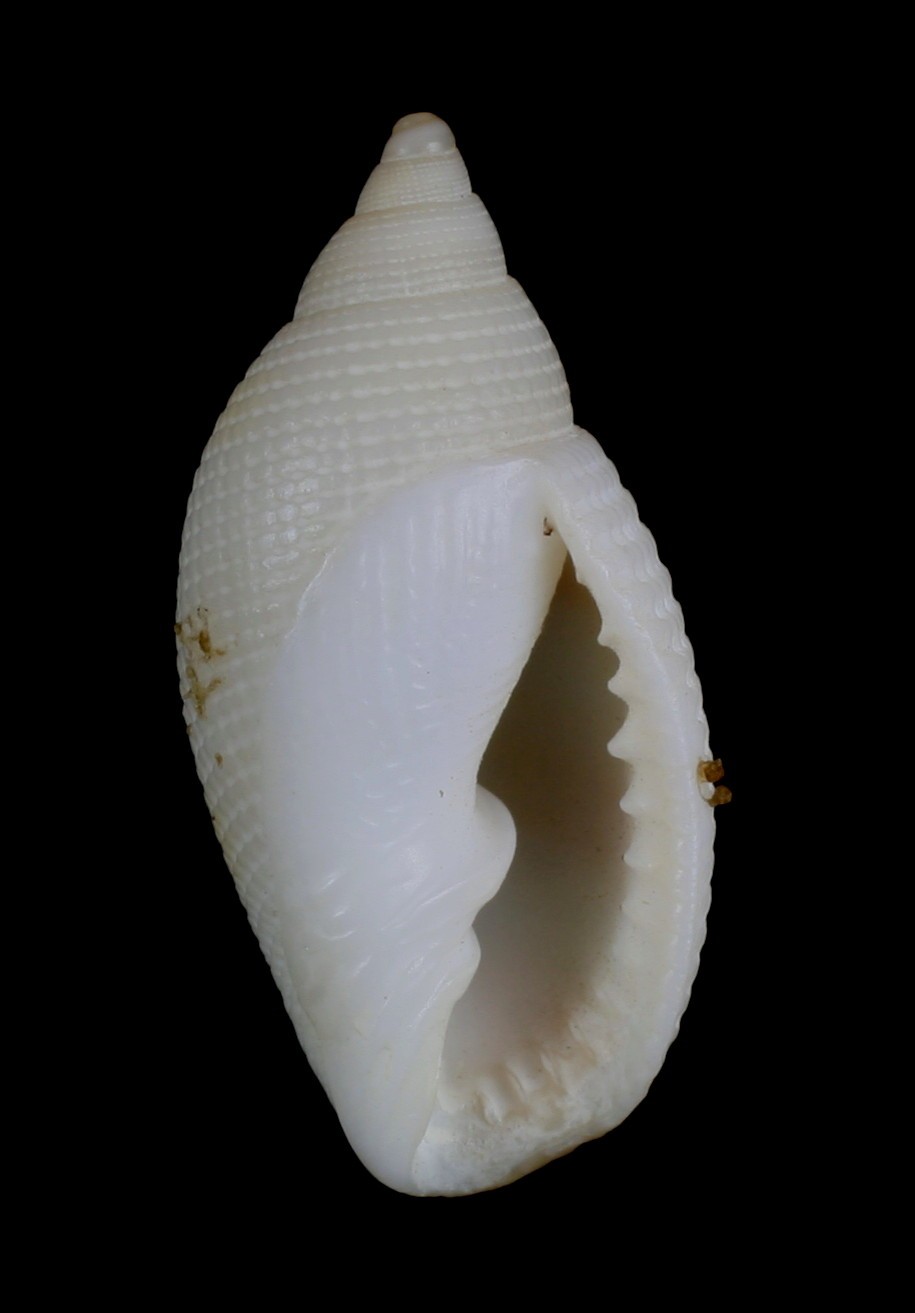
- Apertural view of shell of Aphera tessellata

Scientific classification
- Kingdom: Animalia
- Phylum: Mollusca
- Class: Gastropoda
- Subclass: Caenogastropoda
- Order: Neogastropoda
- Family: Cancellariidae
- Genus: Aphera; H. Adams & A. Adams, 1854

= Aphera =

Genus of gastropods

Aphera is a genus of sea snails, marine gastropod mollusks in the family Cancellariidae, the nutmeg snails.

== Species ==
Species within the genus Aphera include:

- † Aphera islacolonis (Maury, 1917)
- Aphera lindae Petuch, 1987
- † Aphera scopalveus Finlay, 1926
- Aphera tessellata (G. B. Sowerby I, 1832)
