= Ochrodota constellata =

Scientific classification
- Domain: Eukaryota
- Kingdom: Animalia
- Phylum: Arthropoda
- Class: Insecta
- Order: Lepidoptera
- Superfamily: Noctuoidea
- Family: Erebidae
- Subfamily: Arctiinae
- Genus: Ochrodota
- Species: O. constellata

Binomial name
- Ochrodota constellata (Dognin, 1909)

Synonyms
- Ammalo constellata Dognin, 1909

Species of moth

Ochrodota constellata is a moth of the subfamily Arctiinae first described by Paul Dognin in 1909. It is found in Brazil.
