= Fulvocompe bricenoi =

Scientific classification
- Kingdom: Animalia
- Phylum: Arthropoda
- Clade: Pancrustacea
- Class: Insecta
- Order: Lepidoptera
- Superfamily: Noctuoidea
- Family: Erebidae
- Subfamily: Arctiinae
- Genus: Fulvocompe
- Species: F. bricenoi

Binomial name
- Fulvocompe bricenoi (Rothschild, 1909)

Synonyms
- Turuptiana bricenoi Rothschild, 1909; Hypercompe bricenoi (Rothschild, 1909)

Species of moth

Fulvocompe bricenoi is a species of moth in the family Erebidae that was first described by Walter Rothschild in 1909. It is found in Venezuela.
