= Aspilapteryx magna =

Scientific classification
- Kingdom: Animalia
- Phylum: Arthropoda
- Clade: Pancrustacea
- Class: Insecta
- Order: Lepidoptera
- Family: Gracillariidae
- Genus: Aspilapteryx
- Species: A. magna

Binomial name
- Aspilapteryx magna Triberti, 1985

Species of moth

Aspilapteryx magna is a moth of the family Gracillariidae. It is known from the Alborz region in Iran.

The wingspan is 15–16 mm.
