= Fulvocompe lemairei =

Scientific classification
- Kingdom: Animalia
- Phylum: Arthropoda
- Clade: Pancrustacea
- Class: Insecta
- Order: Lepidoptera
- Superfamily: Noctuoidea
- Family: Erebidae
- Subfamily: Arctiinae
- Genus: Fulvocompe
- Species: F. lemairei

Binomial name
- Fulvocompe lemairei (Watson & Goodger, 1986)

Synonyms
- Hypercompe lemairei Watson & Goodger, 1986; Turuptiana pellucida Rothschild, 1917

Species of moth

Fulvocompe lemairei is a species of moth in the family Erebidae that was first described by Watson and Goodger in 1986. It is found in Colombia.
