= Aspilapteryx inquinata =

Scientific classification
- Kingdom: Animalia
- Phylum: Arthropoda
- Clade: Pancrustacea
- Class: Insecta
- Order: Lepidoptera
- Family: Gracillariidae
- Genus: Aspilapteryx
- Species: A. inquinata

Binomial name
- Aspilapteryx inquinata Triberti, 1985

Species of moth

Aspilapteryx inquinata is a moth of the family Gracillariidae. It is known from Turkey, Lebanon, Italy and the North Aegean islands.

The wingspan is 8–10 mm.

The larvae probably mine the leaves of their host plant.
