= Fulvocompe neurophylla =

Scientific classification
- Kingdom: Animalia
- Phylum: Arthropoda
- Clade: Pancrustacea
- Class: Insecta
- Order: Lepidoptera
- Superfamily: Noctuoidea
- Family: Erebidae
- Subfamily: Arctiinae
- Genus: Fulvocompe
- Species: F. neurophylla

Binomial name
- Fulvocompe neurophylla (Walker, 1856)

Synonyms
- Ambryllis neurophylla Walker, 1856; Hypercompe neurophylla (Walker, 1856); Ecpantheria hebona Dognin, 1891

Species of moth

Fulvocompe neurophylla is a species of moth in the family Erebidae that was first described by Francis Walker in 1856. It is found in Venezuela and Ecuador.
