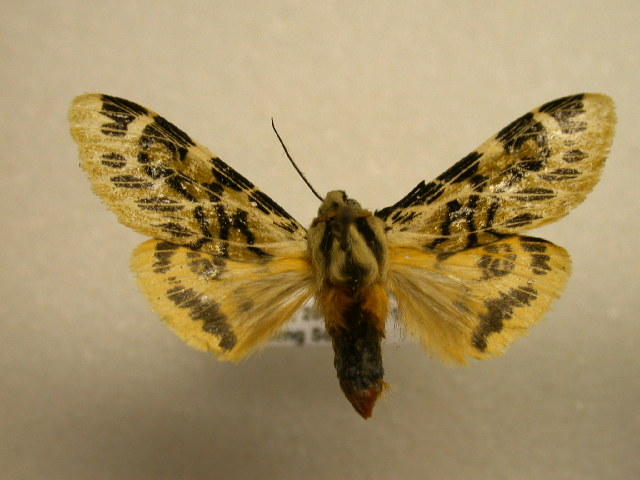

Scientific classification
- Kingdom: Animalia
- Phylum: Arthropoda
- Clade: Pancrustacea
- Class: Insecta
- Order: Lepidoptera
- Superfamily: Noctuoidea
- Family: Erebidae
- Subfamily: Arctiinae
- Genus: Fulvocompe
- Species: F. nemophila

Binomial name
- Fulvocompe nemophila (Herrich-Schäffer, [1853])

Synonyms
- Ecpantheria nemophila Herrich-Schäffer, [1853]; Hypercompe nemophila (Herrich-Schäffer, [1853]); Turuptiana nemophila

= Fulvocompe nemophila =

Species of moth

Fulvocompe nemophila is a species of moth in the family Erebidae that was first described by Gottlieb August Wilhelm Herrich-Schäffer in 1853. It is found in Costa Rica, Guatemala, Peru and Venezuela.
