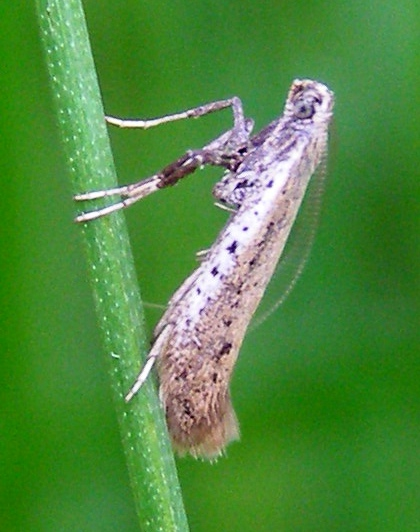

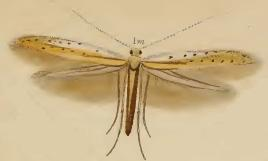

Scientific classification
- Kingdom: Animalia
- Phylum: Arthropoda
- Clade: Pancrustacea
- Class: Insecta
- Order: Lepidoptera
- Family: Gracillariidae
- Genus: Aspilapteryx
- Species: A. tringipennella

Binomial name
- Aspilapteryx tringipennella (Zeller, 1839)

Synonyms
- Gracilaria tringipennella Zeller, 1839

= Aspilapteryx tringipennella =

Species of moth

Aspilapteryx tringipennella is a moth of the family Gracillariidae. It is known from all of Europe.

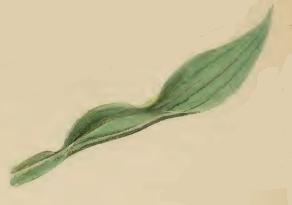
Mined leaf of Plantago lanceolata

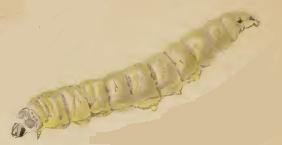
Larva

The wingspan is 10–13 mm. Forewings pale greyish ochreous to light ochreous-yellow; an ill-defined white costal streak from base to near apex; subcostal and median longitudinal rows of black dots, and sometimes two or three on fold. Hindwings grey.

There are two generations per year, with adults on wing in May and again in August.

The larvae feed on Plantago lanceolata and Plantago maritima. They mine the leaves of their host plant.
