= Fulvocompe obscura =

Scientific classification
- Kingdom: Animalia
- Phylum: Arthropoda
- Clade: Pancrustacea
- Class: Insecta
- Order: Lepidoptera
- Superfamily: Noctuoidea
- Family: Erebidae
- Subfamily: Arctiinae
- Genus: Fulvocompe
- Species: F. obscura

Binomial name
- Fulvocompe obscura (Schaus, 1901)

Synonyms
- Turuptiana obscura Schaus, 1901; Hypercompe obscura (Schaus, 1901)

Species of moth

Fulvocompe obscura is a species of moth in the family Erebidae that was first described by William Schaus in 1901. It is found in Peru.
