= Sparganopseustis =

Scientific classification
- Kingdom: Animalia
- Phylum: Arthropoda
- Clade: Pancrustacea
- Class: Insecta
- Order: Lepidoptera
- Family: Tortricidae
- Tribe: Sparganothini
- Genus: Sparganopseustis; Powell & Lambert, 1986

Genus of tortrix moths

Sparganopseustis is a genus of moths belonging to the subfamily Tortricinae of the family Tortricidae.

== Species ==
- Sparganopseustis acrocharis (Meyrick, 1932)
- Sparganopseustis aurolimbana (Zeller, 1866)
- Sparganopseustis elimata Meyrick, 1930
- Sparganopseustis flaviciliana (Walsingham, 1913)
- Sparganopseustis flavicirrata (Walsingham, 1914)
- Sparganopseustis garlaczi Razowski & Wojtusiak, 2008
- Sparganopseustis geminorum Meyrick, 1932
- Sparganopseustis martinana Powell, 1986
- Sparganopseustis myrota Meyrick, 1912
- Sparganopseustis ningorana (Walsingham, 1914)
- Sparganopseustis niveigutta (Walsingham, 1913)
- Sparganopseustis tessellata (Walsingham, 1913)
- Sparganopseustis unipunctata (Walsingham, 1914)
- Sparganopseustis unithicta Razowski & Wojtusiak, 2010

== See also ==
- List of Tortricidae genera
