= Sparganopseustis acrocharis =

Scientific classification
- Kingdom: Animalia
- Phylum: Arthropoda
- Clade: Pancrustacea
- Class: Insecta
- Order: Lepidoptera
- Family: Tortricidae
- Genus: Sparganopseustis
- Species: S. acrocharis

Binomial name
- Sparganopseustis acrocharis (Meyrick, 1932)

Synonyms
- Ctenopseutis acrocharis Meyrick, 1932

Species of moth

Sparganopseustis acrocharis is a species of moth of the family Tortricidae. It is found in Colombia and Carchi Province, Ecuador.
