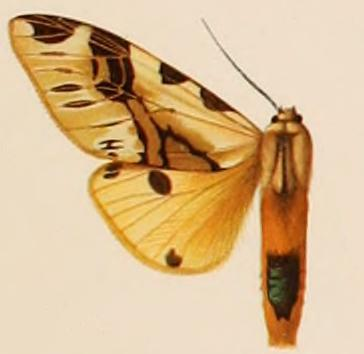

Scientific classification
- Kingdom: Animalia
- Phylum: Arthropoda
- Clade: Pancrustacea
- Class: Insecta
- Order: Lepidoptera
- Superfamily: Noctuoidea
- Family: Erebidae
- Subfamily: Arctiinae
- Genus: Fulvocompe
- Species: F. ockendeni

Binomial name
- Fulvocompe ockendeni (Rothschild, 1909)

Synonyms
- Turuptiana ockendeni Rothschild, 1909; Hypercompe ockendeni (Rothschild, 1909)

= Fulvocompe ockendeni =

Species of moth

Fulvocompe ockendeni is a species of moth in the family Erebidae that was first described by Walter Rothschild in 1909. It is found in Peru and Bolivia.
