= Ochrodota similis =

Scientific classification
- Domain: Eukaryota
- Kingdom: Animalia
- Phylum: Arthropoda
- Class: Insecta
- Order: Lepidoptera
- Superfamily: Noctuoidea
- Family: Erebidae
- Subfamily: Arctiinae
- Genus: Ochrodota
- Species: O. similis

Binomial name
- Ochrodota similis Rothschild, 1909

Species of moth

Ochrodota similis is a moth of the subfamily Arctiinae first described by Rothschild in 1909. It is found in Brazil.
