= Aspilapteryx grypota =

Scientific classification
- Kingdom: Animalia
- Phylum: Arthropoda
- Class: Insecta
- Order: Lepidoptera
- Family: Gracillariidae
- Genus: Aspilapteryx
- Species: A. grypota

Binomial name
- Aspilapteryx grypota (Meyrick, 1914)

Synonyms
- Gracilaria grypota Meyrick, 1914

Species of moth

Aspilapteryx grypota is a moth of the family Gracillariidae. It is known from South Africa.

The larvae feed on Salix babylonica. They probably mine the leaves of their host plant.
