= Sparganopseustis unithicta =

Scientific classification
- Kingdom: Animalia
- Phylum: Arthropoda
- Clade: Pancrustacea
- Class: Insecta
- Order: Lepidoptera
- Family: Tortricidae
- Genus: Sparganopseustis
- Species: S. unithicta

Binomial name
- Sparganopseustis unithicta Razowski & Wojtusiak, 2010

Species of moth

Sparganopseustis unithicta is a species of moth of the family Tortricidae. It is known from the Yanachaga–Chemillén National Park in the Pasco Region, Peru. The holotype was collected at 2,400 m (7,900 ft) above sea level.

The wingspan is about 28 mm for the holotype, a female.
