= Ochrodota marina =

Scientific classification
- Domain: Eukaryota
- Kingdom: Animalia
- Phylum: Arthropoda
- Class: Insecta
- Order: Lepidoptera
- Superfamily: Noctuoidea
- Family: Erebidae
- Subfamily: Arctiinae
- Genus: Ochrodota
- Species: O. marina

Binomial name
- Ochrodota marina Schaus, 1910

Species of moth

Ochrodota marina is a moth of the subfamily Arctiinae first described by William Schaus in 1910. It is found in Costa Rica.
