= Aspilapteryx seriata =

Scientific classification
- Domain: Eukaryota
- Kingdom: Animalia
- Phylum: Arthropoda
- Class: Insecta
- Order: Lepidoptera
- Family: Gracillariidae
- Genus: Aspilapteryx
- Species: A. seriata

Binomial name
- Aspilapteryx seriata (Meyrick, 1912)

Synonyms
- Gracilaria seriata Meyrick, 1912

Species of moth

Aspilapteryx seriata is a moth of the family Gracillariidae. It is known from South Africa.
