= Sparganopseustis ningorana =

Scientific classification
- Kingdom: Animalia
- Phylum: Arthropoda
- Clade: Pancrustacea
- Class: Insecta
- Order: Lepidoptera
- Family: Tortricidae
- Genus: Sparganopseustis
- Species: S. ningorana

Binomial name
- Sparganopseustis ningorana (Walsingham, 1914)

Synonyms
- Ctenopseustis ningorana Walsingham, 1914

Species of moth

Sparganopseustis ningorana is a species of moth of the family Tortricidae. It is found in Guatemala, specifically in the Cerro Zunil area. So far, there is no widely recognized common name for Sparganopseustis ningorana. This is common to many moth species, especially those with restricted geographic distribution or that do not have significant economical or ecological impact.
