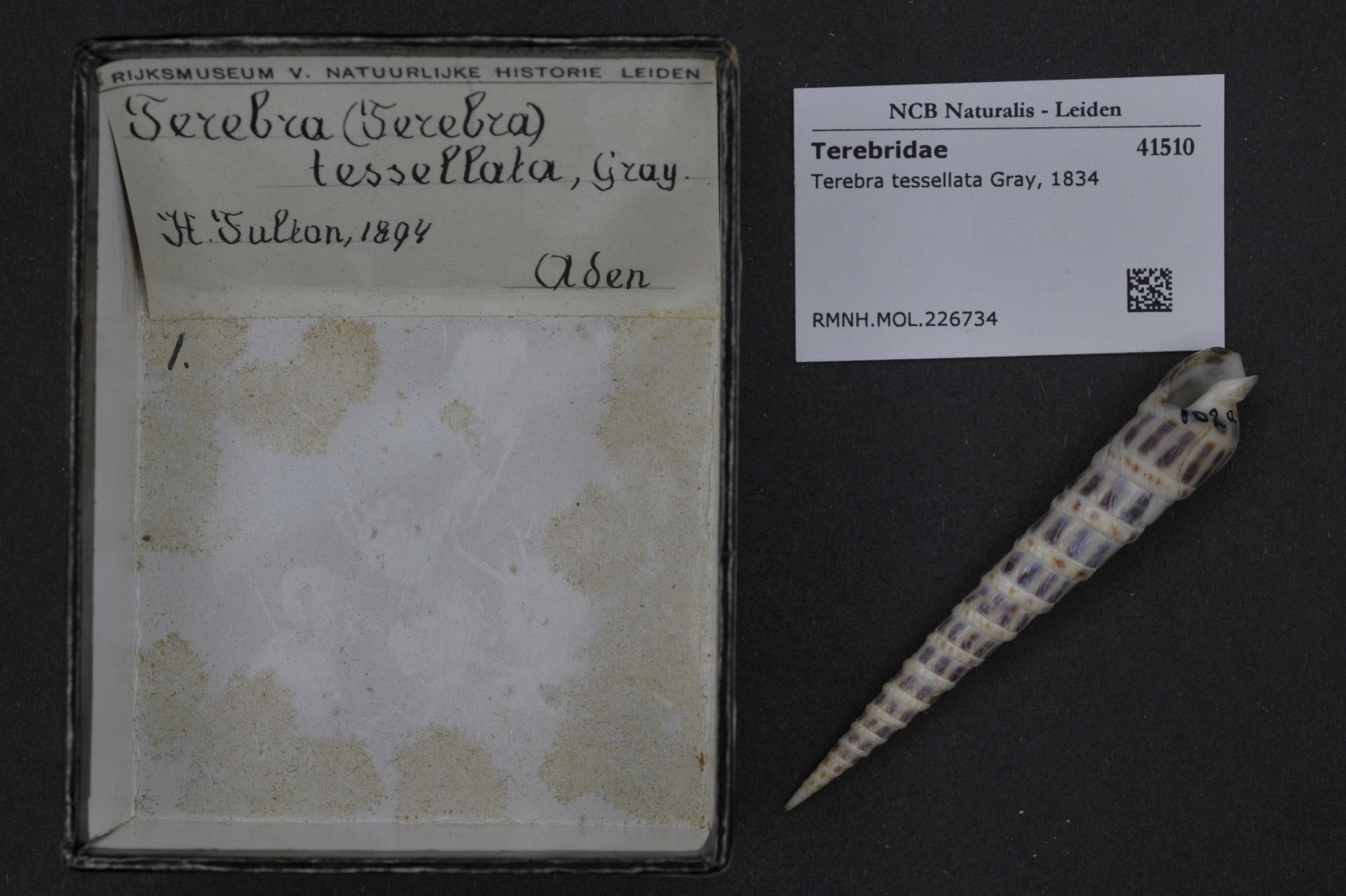
- Terebra tessellata Gray, 1834

Scientific classification
- Kingdom: Animalia
- Phylum: Mollusca
- Class: Gastropoda
- Subclass: Caenogastropoda
- Order: Neogastropoda
- Family: Terebridae
- Genus: Terebra
- Species: T. tessellata

Binomial name
- Terebra tessellata Gray, 1834

Synonyms
- Terebra decorata Deshayes, 1867

= Terebra tessellata =

Species of gastropod

Terebra tessellata is a species of sea snail, a marine gastropod mollusc in the family Terebridae, the auger snails.
