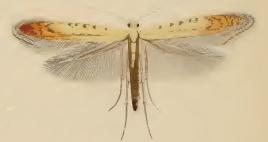
- Aspilapteryx limosella

Scientific classification
- Domain: Eukaryota
- Kingdom: Animalia
- Phylum: Arthropoda
- Class: Insecta
- Order: Lepidoptera
- Family: Gracillariidae
- Subfamily: Gracillariinae
- Genus: Aspilapteryx; Spuler, 1910

Species
- See text

Synonyms
- Sabulopteryx Triberti, 1985

= Aspilapteryx =

Genus of moths

Aspilapteryx is a genus of moths in the family Gracillariidae.

== Species ==
- Aspilapteryx filifera (Meyrick, 1912)
- Aspilapteryx grypota (Meyrick, 1914)
- Aspilapteryx inquinata Triberti, 1985
- Aspilapteryx limosella (Duponchel, 1843)
- Aspilapteryx magna Triberti, 1985
- Aspilapteryx multipunctella (Chrétien, 1917)
- Aspilapteryx pentaplaca (Meyrick, 1911)
- Aspilapteryx seriata (Meyrick, 1912)
- Aspilapteryx spectabilis Huemer, 1994
- Aspilapteryx tessellata (Turner, 1940)
- Aspilapteryx tringipennella (Zeller, 1839)
