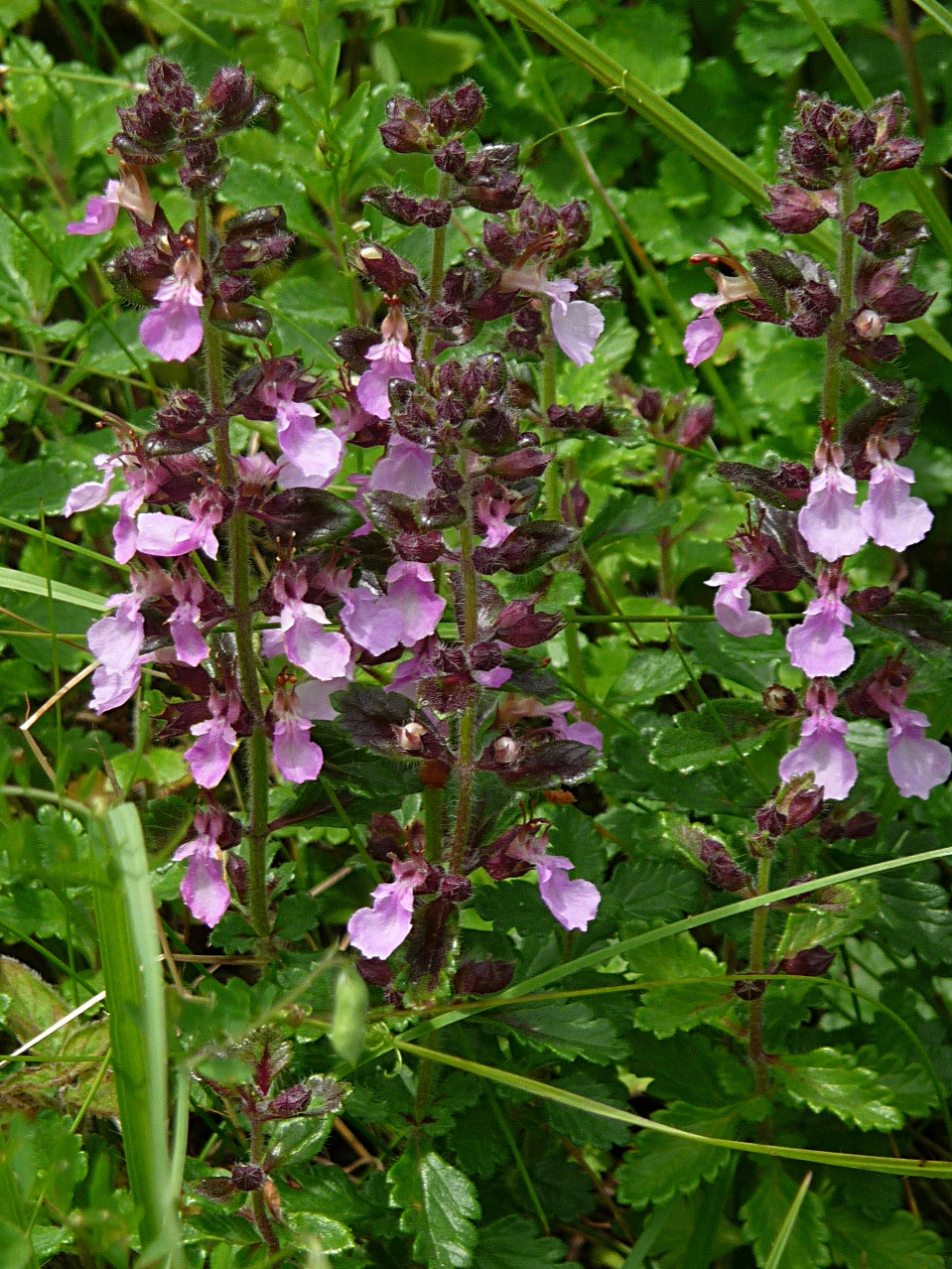

Scientific classification
- Kingdom: Plantae
- Clade: Tracheophytes
- Clade: Angiosperms
- Clade: Eudicots
- Clade: Asterids
- Order: Lamiales
- Family: Lamiaceae
- Genus: Teucrium
- Species: T. chamaedrys

Binomial name
- Teucrium chamaedrys L.

= Teucrium chamaedrys =

Wall germander

Species of flowering plant

Teucrium chamaedrys, the wall germander, is a species of plant native to the Mediterranean regions of Europe and North Africa, and the Middle East as far as Iran. It is used as an ornamental.

== Subspecies ==
1. Teucrium chamaedrys subsp. albarracinii (Pau) Rech.f. - France, Spain
2. Teucrium chamaedrys subsp. algeriense Rech.f. - Algeria
3. Teucrium chamaedrys subsp. chamaedrys - central + southern Europe, Caucasus, Turkey, Iran
4. Teucrium chamaedrys subsp. germanicum (F.Herm.) Rech.f. - France, Germany
5. Teucrium chamaedrys subsp. gracile (Batt.) Rech.f. - Algeria, Morocco
6. Teucrium chamaedrys subsp. lydium O.Schwarz - Greece, Turkey
7. Teucrium chamaedrys var. multinodum Bordz. - Caucasus
8. Teucrium chamaedrys subsp. nuchense (K.Koch) Rech.f. - Caucasus
9. Teucrium chamaedrys subsp. olympicum Rech.f. - Greece
10. Teucrium chamaedrys subsp. pectinatum Rech.f. - France, Italy
11. Teucrium chamaedrys subsp. pinnatifidum (Sennen) Rech.f. - France, Spain
12. Teucrium chamaedrys subsp. sinuatum (Celak.) Rech.f. - Iran, Iraq, Turkey
13. Teucrium chamaedrys subsp. syspirense (K.Koch) Rech.f. - Crimea, Caucasus, Turkey, Iran, Turkmenistan
14. Teucrium chamaedrys subsp. tauricola Rech.f. - Turkey, Syria
15. Teucrium chamaedrys subsp. trapezunticum Rech.f. - Caucasus, Turkey

== Appearance ==
Wall germander is a creeping evergreen perennial 6–18 inches tall. Its scalloped, opposite leaves are 0.5–1.5 inches long, dark green, and shiny. In late summer, tubular flowers grow in whorls from the leaf axils.

== Dietary supplements ==
=== Bans ===
Dietary supplements using germander are highly hepatotoxic (causing liver damage). Its sale was prohibited in France by the French Ministry of Health in April 1992. It causes acute hepatitis with an onset delay of 6 weeks to 6 months, and as of 1992 there has been at least one known case of fatal hepatic dysfunction (death from liver damage). As of 2017 its sale has been prohibited in the USA.

=== History ===
Prior to being identified as hepatotoxic, this herb was sold in European pharmacies and health specialty stores for a variety of uses, including the following:

- slimming diet
- treatment of mild diarrhea
- topical analgesic for oral cavity infections

== Cultivation ==
Wall germander can be grown in USDA Zones 5–10. It may be propagated by vegetative cuttings or by the division of established clumps.

== Gallery ==
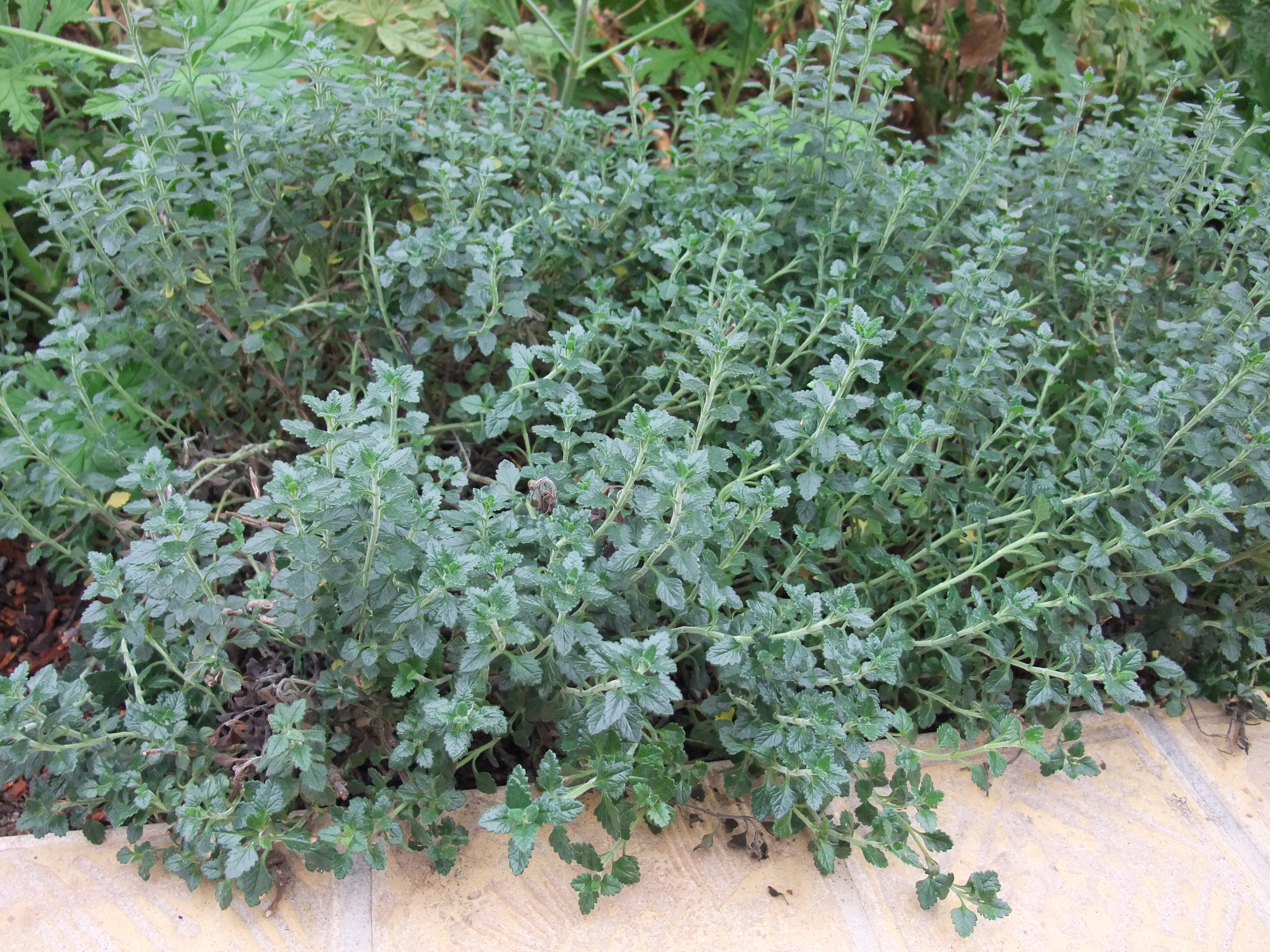
Plants

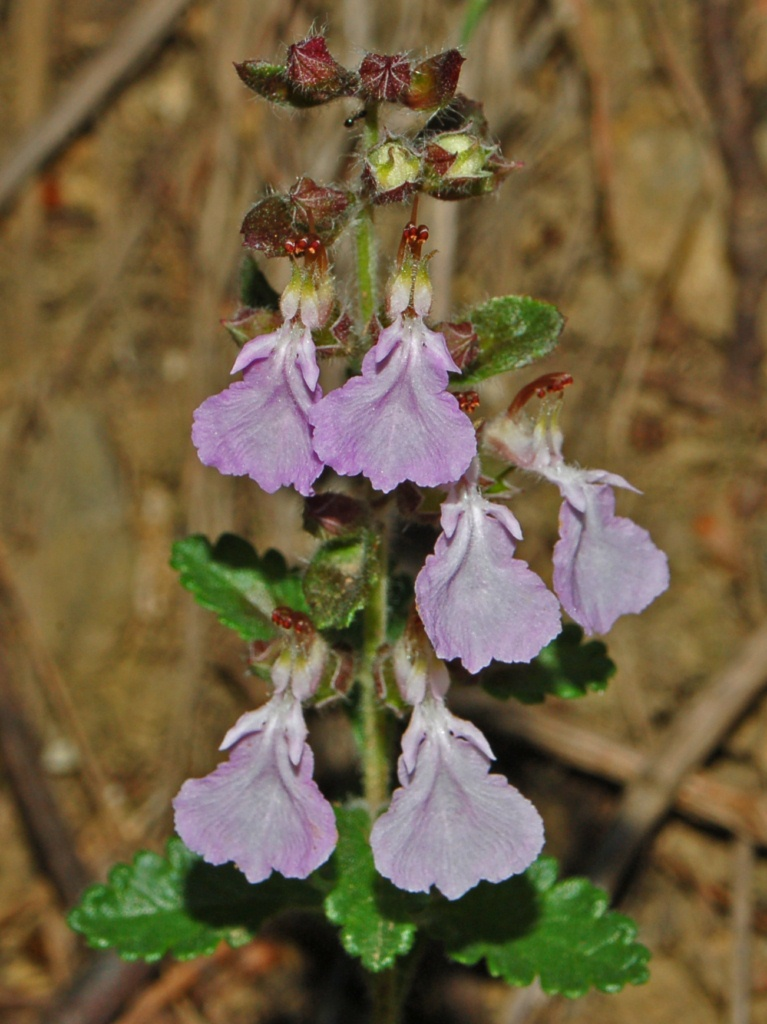
Inflorescence

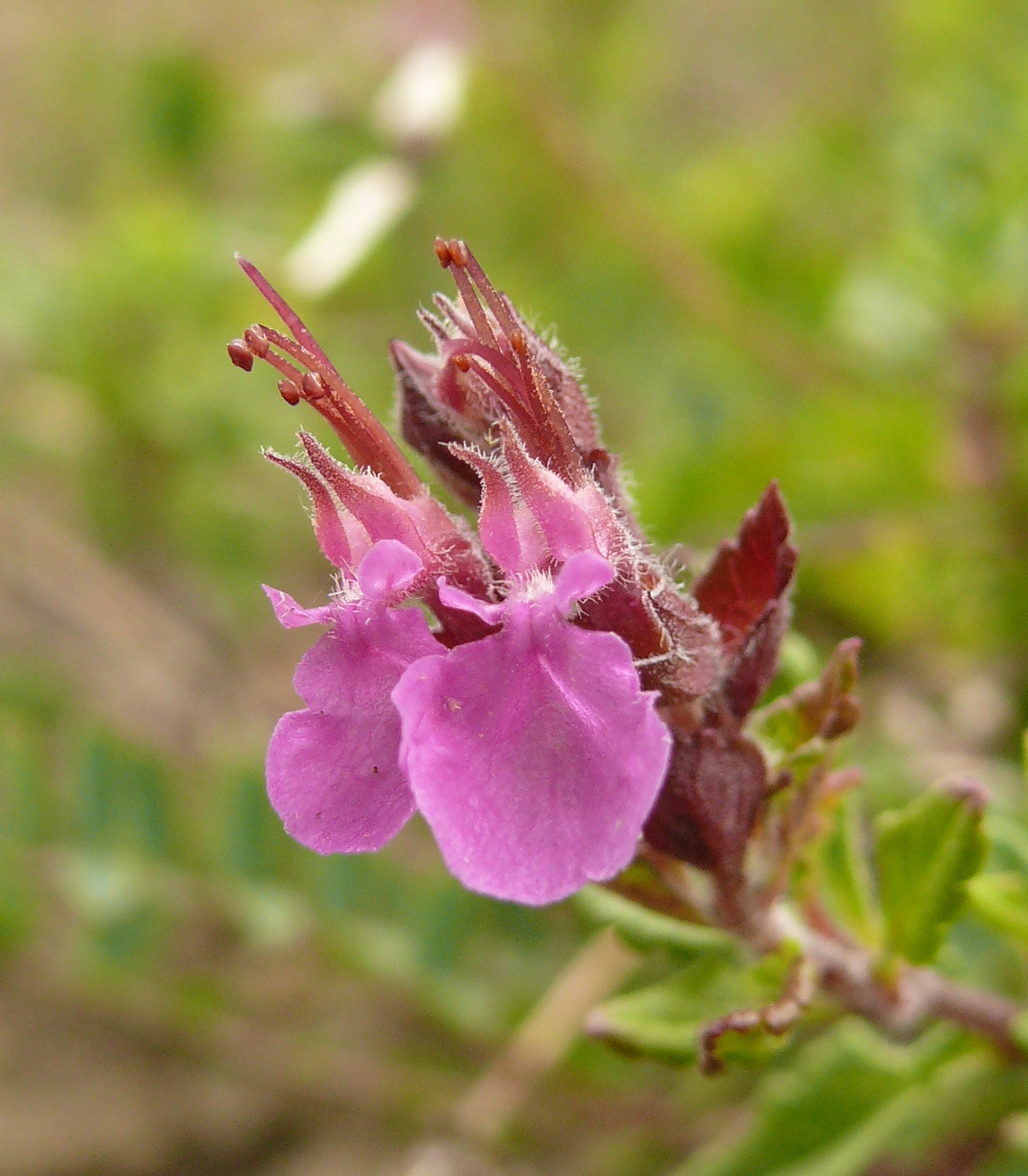
Flowers

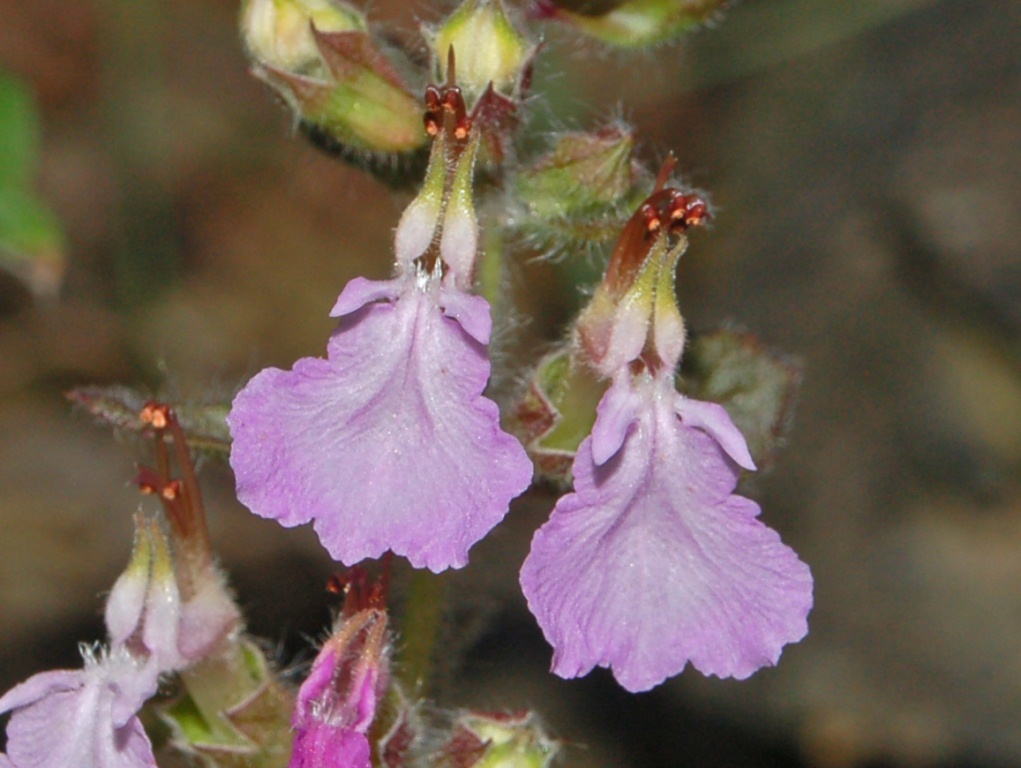
Close-up

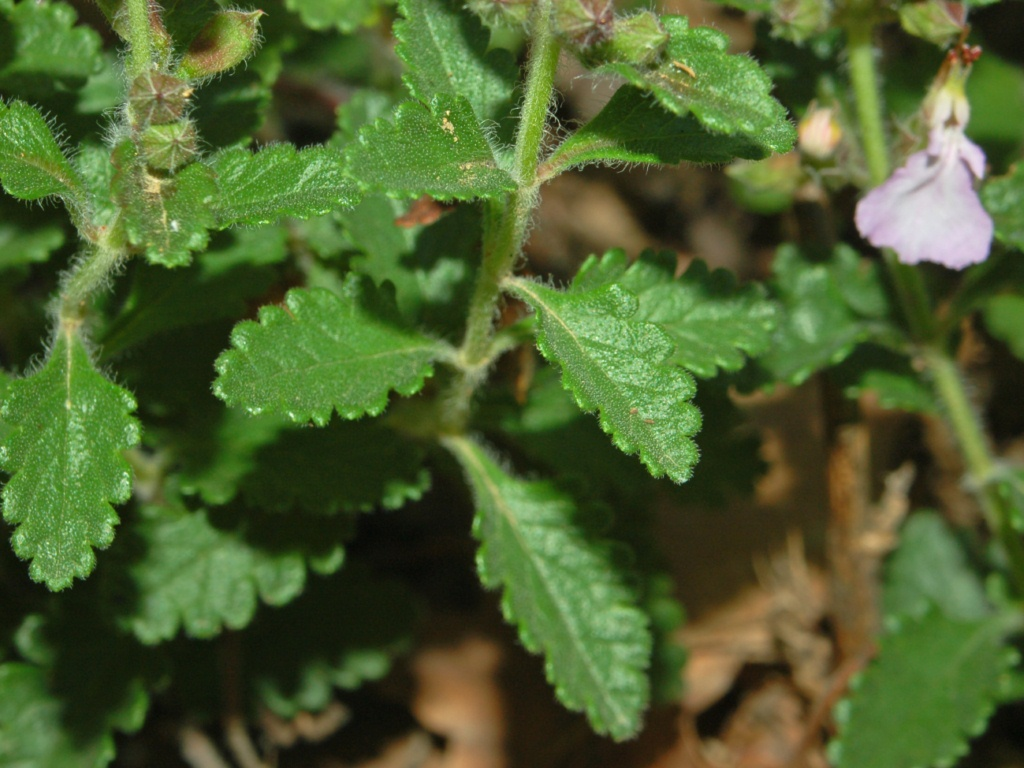
Leaves
