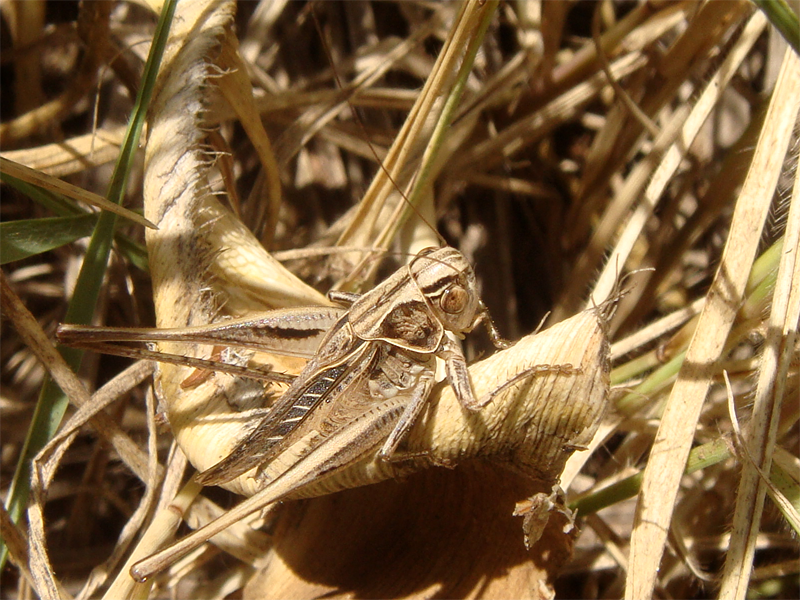
- Tessellana tessellata

Scientific classification
- Domain: Eukaryota
- Kingdom: Animalia
- Phylum: Arthropoda
- Class: Insecta
- Order: Orthoptera
- Suborder: Ensifera
- Family: Tettigoniidae
- Subfamily: Tettigoniinae
- Tribe: Platycleidini
- Genus: Tessellana; Zeuner, 1941

= Tessellana =

Genus of cricket-like animals

Tessellana is a genus of bush crickets in the tribe Platycleidini and genus group Platycleis, erected by Zeuner in 1941. Species can be found throughout mainland Europe, the Middle East and North Africa.

== Species ==
The Orthoptera Species File lists:

1. Tessellana carinata Berland & Chopard, 1922
2. Tessellana lagrecai Messina, 1979
3. Tessellana nigrosignata Costa, 1863
4. Tessellana orina Burr, 1899
5. Tessellana tessellata (Charpentier, 1825) - type species (as Locusta tessellata Charpentier = T. t. tessellata, one of 2 subspecies)
6. Tessellana veyseli Koçak, 1984
