= Sparganopseustis tessellata =

Scientific classification
- Kingdom: Animalia
- Phylum: Arthropoda
- Clade: Pancrustacea
- Class: Insecta
- Order: Lepidoptera
- Family: Tortricidae
- Genus: Sparganopseustis
- Species: S. tessellata

Binomial name
- Sparganopseustis tessellata (Walsingham, 1913)

Synonyms
- Epagoge tessellata Walsingham, 1913

Species of moth

Sparganopseustis tessellata is a species of moth of the family Tortricidae. It is found in Guatemala.
