= Ochrodota tessellata =

Scientific classification
- Domain: Eukaryota
- Kingdom: Animalia
- Phylum: Arthropoda
- Class: Insecta
- Order: Lepidoptera
- Superfamily: Noctuoidea
- Family: Erebidae
- Subfamily: Arctiinae
- Genus: Ochrodota
- Species: O. tessellata

Binomial name
- Ochrodota tessellata Rothschild, 1909

Species of moth

Ochrodota tessellata is a moth of the subfamily Arctiinae first described by Rothschild in 1909. It is found in Brazil and Peru.
