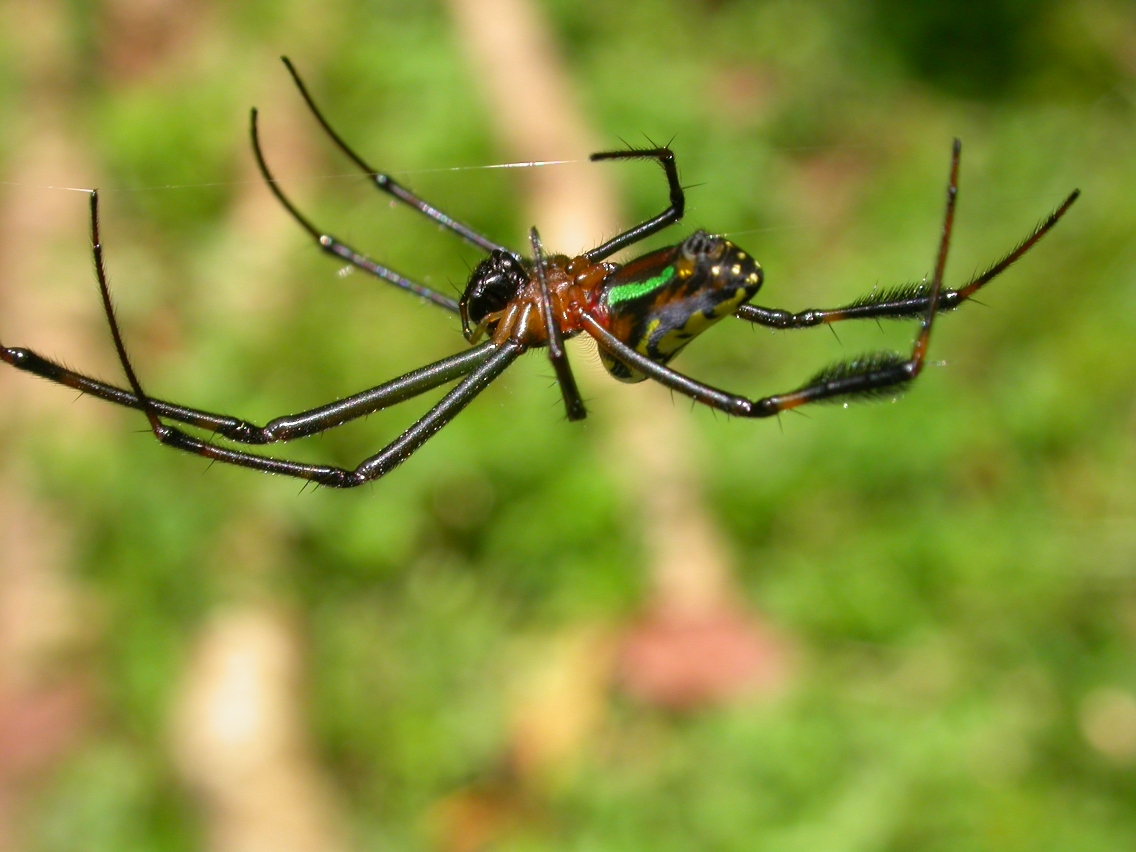
- female from Southern India

Scientific classification
- Kingdom: Animalia
- Phylum: Arthropoda
- Subphylum: Chelicerata
- Class: Arachnida
- Order: Araneae
- Infraorder: Araneomorphae
- Family: Tetragnathidae
- Genus: Leucauge
- Species: L. tessellata

Binomial name
- Leucauge tessellata (Thorell, 1887)

Synonyms
- Callinethis tessellata Thorell, 1887; Argyroepeira tessellata Pocock, 1900; Leucauge lygisma Wang, 1991; Leucauge termisticta Song & Zhu, 1992; Leucauge nitella Zhu, Song & Zhang, 2003; Leucauge subtessellata Zhu, Song & Zhang, 2003

= Leucauge tessellata =

Species of spider

Leucauge tessellata is a species of spider in the family Tetragnathidae. It has a wide distribution across Asia, ranging from India to China and Southeast Asia.

== Taxonomy ==
The species was first described by Tamerlan Thorell in 1887 as Callinethis tessellata based on female specimens from Burma (now Myanmar). The male was later described by Frederic Henry Gravely in 1921.

Several species have been synonymized with L. tessellata over time. Leucauge lygisma and L. termisticta were synonymized by Zhu, Song & Zhang in 2003, while L. nitella and L. subtessellata were later synonymized by Yoshida in 2009.

== Distribution ==
Leucauge tessellata is widely distributed across Asia. It has been recorded from India, China, Thailand, Vietnam, Laos, Taiwan, and Indonesia (specifically the Moluccas).

In India, the species is commonly found in the Darjeeling District during the monsoon season, often occurring together with the similar species Leucauge celebesiana. Gravely reported it from various locations including the Cochin hills, Coorg, the Darjeeling hills, and parts of Assam including the Garo Hills.

== Habitat ==
The species typically inhabits forested areas at various elevations. In the Darjeeling region, it has been recorded from altitudes ranging from 600 to 5000 feet (approximately 180 to 1500 meters), suggesting it can adapt to different elevational zones within its range.

== Description ==
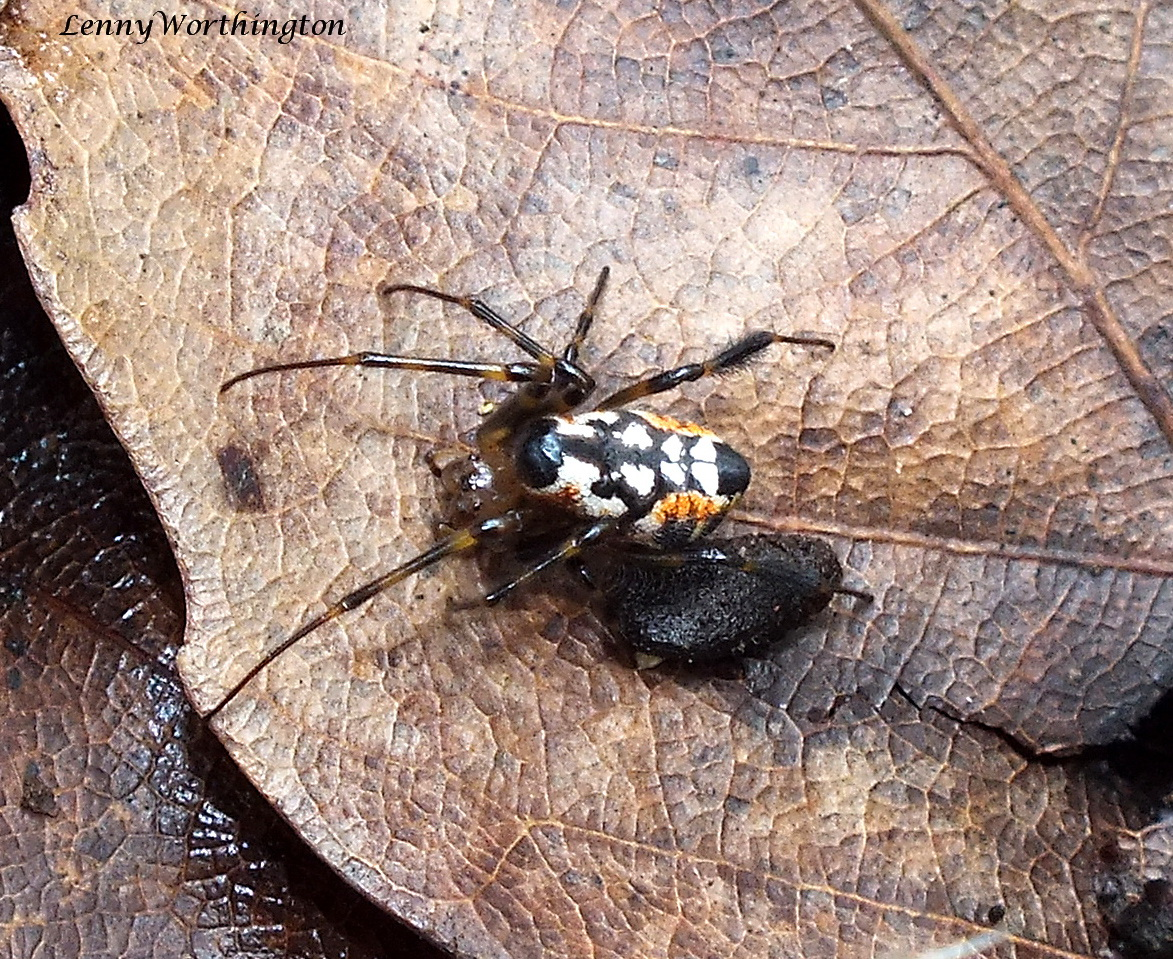
female from Thailand

Leucauge tessellata can be distinguished from related species by several key characteristics. The female is notable for having dense, somewhat long black hairs covering the distal two-thirds of the tibiae on the fourth pair of legs. This feature readily distinguishes it from L. celebesiana and other similar species with which it may occur.

The male can be identified by its somewhat more prominent eyes compared to related species, and by its large, dark-colored palpal organs that possess both inner and outer tarsal apophyses.

The species resembles L. celebesiana in general size, form, and coloration, but the distinctive leg hair pattern in females and palpal structure in males provide reliable identification features.
