= Aspilapteryx tessellata =

Scientific classification
- Kingdom: Animalia
- Phylum: Arthropoda
- Clade: Pancrustacea
- Class: Insecta
- Order: Lepidoptera
- Family: Gracillariidae
- Genus: Aspilapteryx
- Species: A. tessellata

Binomial name
- Aspilapteryx tessellata (Turner, 1940)

Synonyms
- Gracilaria tessellata Turner, 1940

Species of moth

Aspilapteryx tessellata is a moth of the family Gracillariidae. It is known from New South Wales, Australia. It has been recommended that this species be further studied as its placement within the genus Aspilapteryx is in need of clarification.
