= Fulvocompe tessellata =

Scientific classification
- Kingdom: Animalia
- Phylum: Arthropoda
- Clade: Pancrustacea
- Class: Insecta
- Order: Lepidoptera
- Superfamily: Noctuoidea
- Family: Erebidae
- Subfamily: Arctiinae
- Genus: Fulvocompe
- Species: F. tessellata

Binomial name
- Fulvocompe tessellata (H. Druce, 1906)

Synonyms
- Turuptiana tessellata H. Druce, 1906; Hypercompe tessellata (H. Druce, 1906)

Species of moth

Fulvocompe tessellata is a species of moth in the subfamily Arctiinae that was first described by Herbert Druce in 1906. It is found in Peru.
