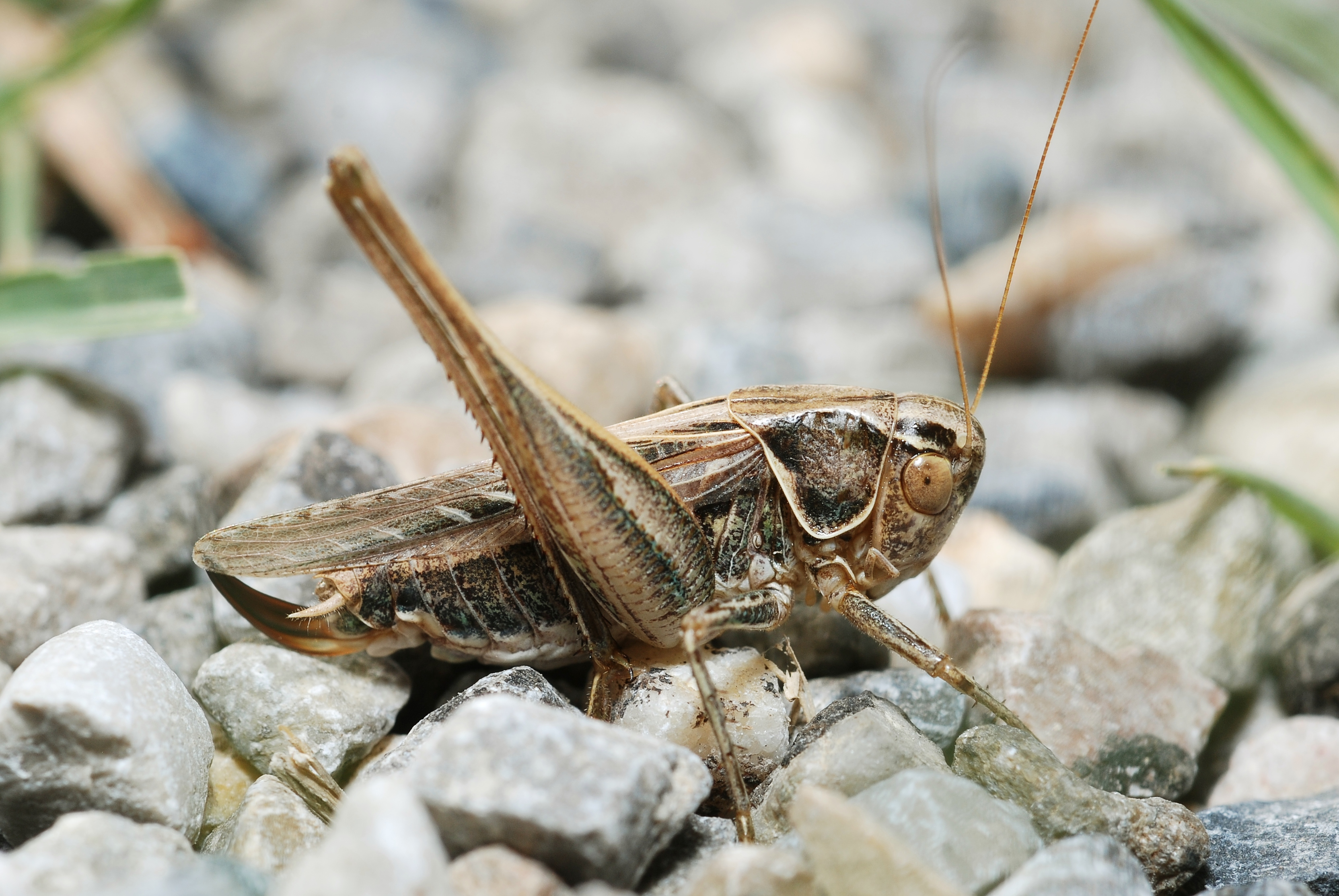
- Female

Scientific classification
- Domain: Eukaryota
- Kingdom: Animalia
- Phylum: Arthropoda
- Class: Insecta
- Order: Orthoptera
- Suborder: Ensifera
- Family: Tettigoniidae
- Subfamily: Tettigoniinae
- Tribe: Platycleidini
- Genus: Tessellana
- Species: T. tessellata

Binomial name
- Tessellana tessellata (Charpentier 1825)

Synonyms
- Platycleis holoptera emrahi Koçak, 1984; Platycleis tessellata (Charpentier, 1825)

= Tessellana tessellata =

Species of cricket-like animal

Tessellana tessellata known as the brown-spotted bush-cricket is a European and North African insect in the tribe Platycleidini (Tettigoniidae).

Close-Up of a Tesselana tesselata

== Subspecies ==
Orthoptera Species File lists two subspecies:

- T. tessellata holoptera Ramme, 1951
- T. tessellata tessellata (Charpentier, 1825)
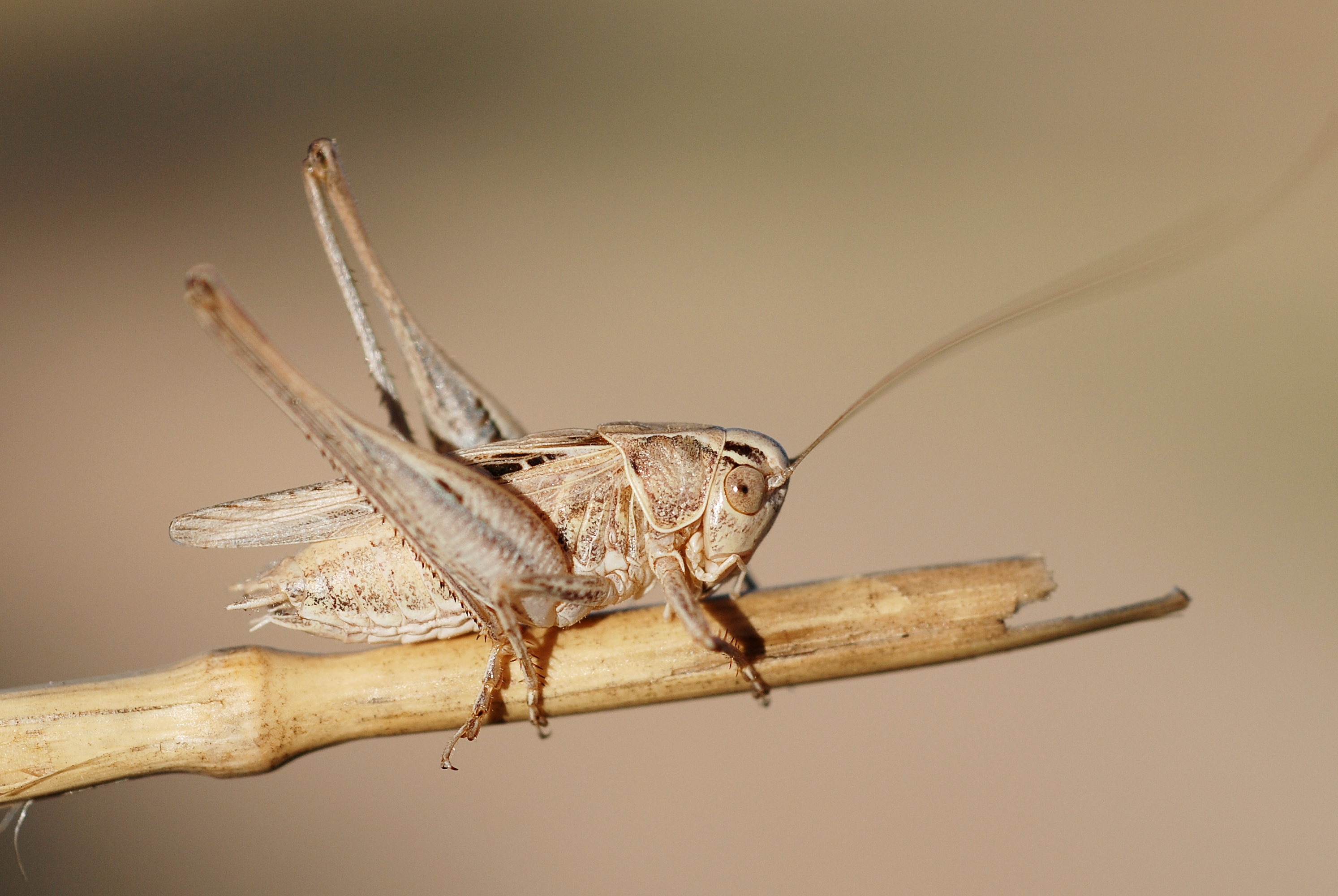
Male

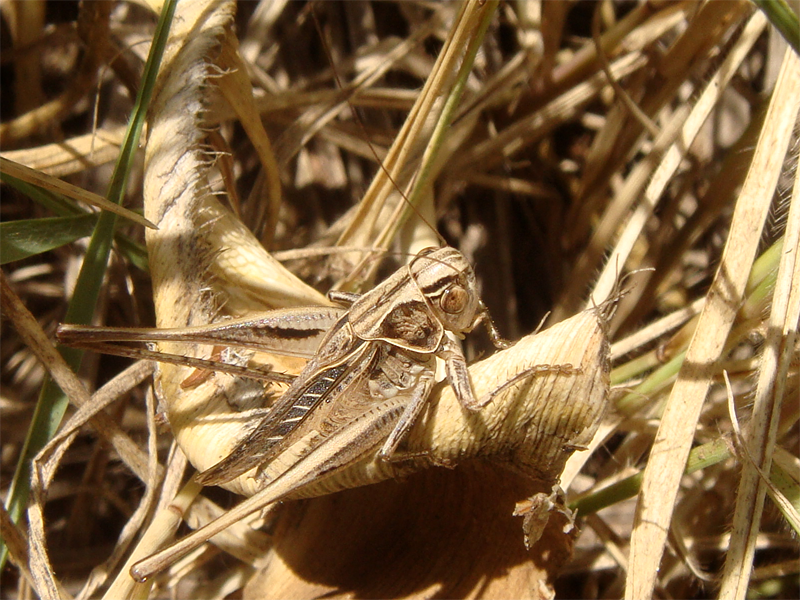
In Portugal
