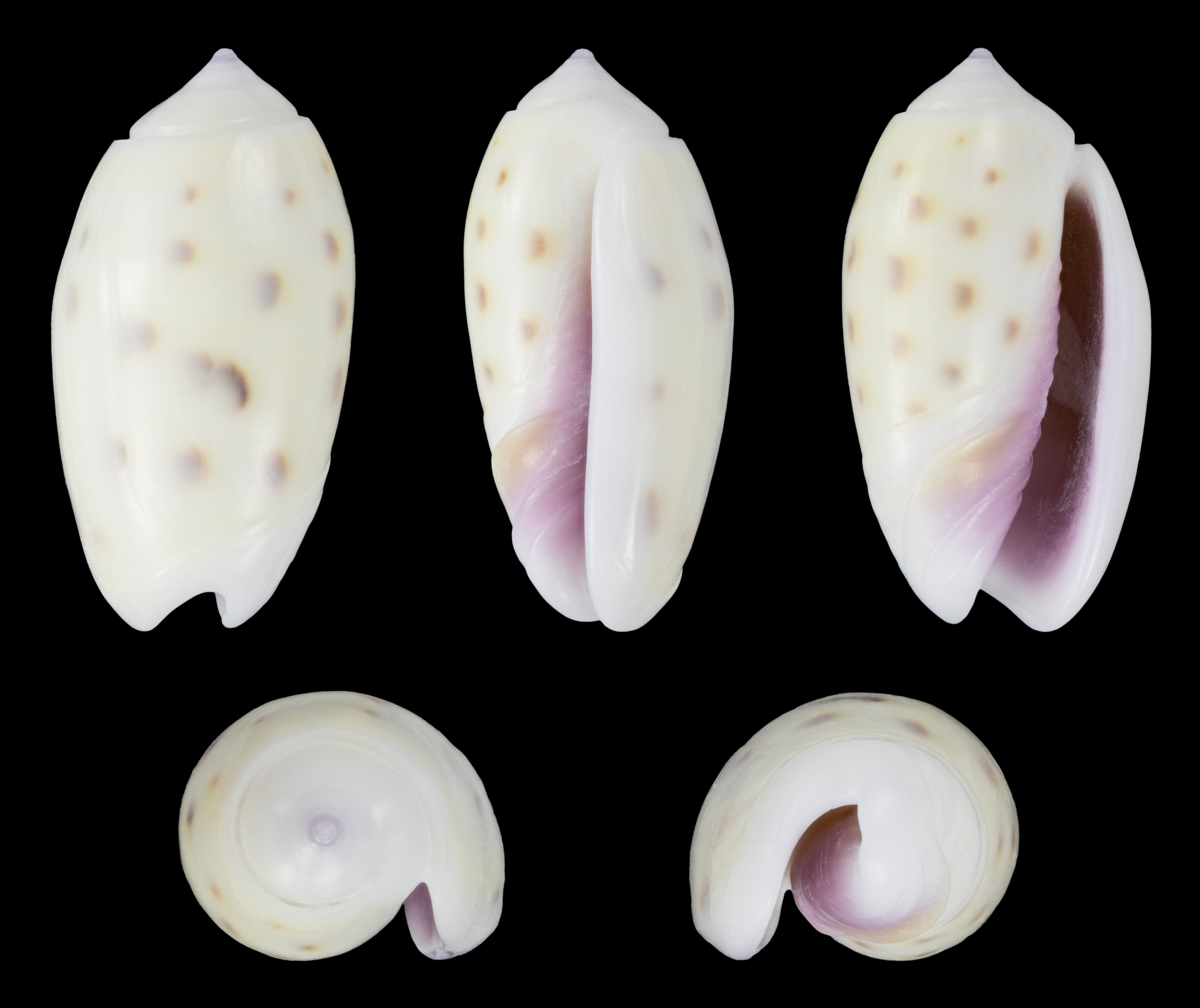

Scientific classification
- Kingdom: Animalia
- Phylum: Mollusca
- Class: Gastropoda
- Subclass: Caenogastropoda
- Order: Neogastropoda
- Family: Olividae
- Genus: Oliva
- Species: O. tessellata

Binomial name
- Oliva tessellata Lamarck, 1811

Synonyms
- Oliva tesselata (misspelling); Oliva (Neocylindrus) guttata Fischer von Waldheim, G., 1807; Oliva (Neocylindrus) tessellata Lamarck, 1811

= Oliva tessellata =

Species of gastropod

Oliva tessellata, common name the tessellate olive, is a species of sea snail, a marine gastropod mollusk in the family Olividae, the olives.

== Description ==
The length of the shell varies between 15 mm and 60 mm. The shell is a glossy creamy-yellow or pale cream with widely spaced spots in purplish-brown or chestnut. The opening of the shell is dark violet, and it usually has a light brown band around it. The top of the shell I covered in a thick and smooth layer.

== Distribution ==
This marine species occurs in the Eastern Indian Ocean and off Taiwan, New Caledonia and Eastern Australia.
