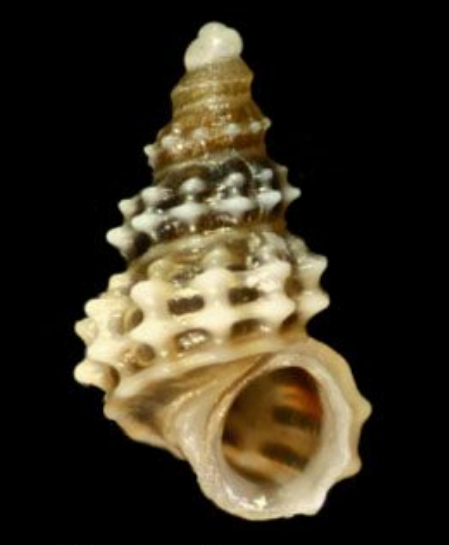
- Shell of Alvania tessellata (specimen at the Natural History Museum, Rotterdam)

Scientific classification
- Kingdom: Animalia
- Phylum: Mollusca
- Class: Gastropoda
- Subclass: Caenogastropoda
- Order: Littorinimorpha
- Family: Rissoidae
- Genus: Alvania
- Species: A. tessellata

Binomial name
- Alvania tessellata Weinkauff, 1868

= Alvania tessellata =

Species of gastropod

Alvania tessellata is a species of minute sea snail, a marine gastropod mollusk or micromollusk in the family Rissoidae.

== Description ==
The length of the shell attains 3.6 mm.

== Distribution ==
This species occurs in the Mediterranean Sea off Spain and Algeria.
