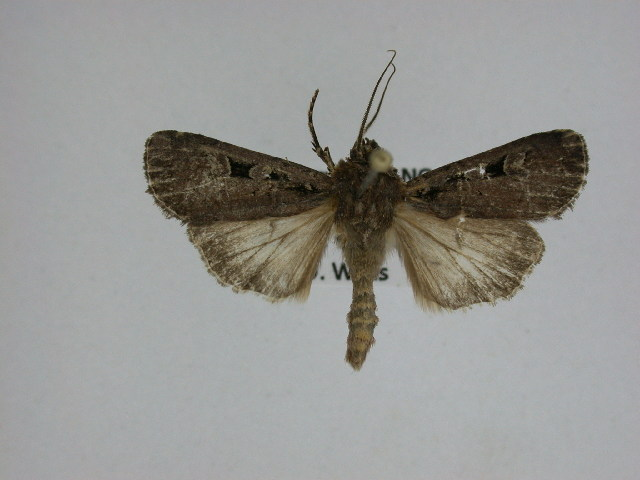

Scientific classification
- Domain: Eukaryota
- Kingdom: Animalia
- Phylum: Arthropoda
- Class: Insecta
- Order: Lepidoptera
- Superfamily: Noctuoidea
- Family: Noctuidae
- Genus: Euxoa
- Species: E. tessellata

Binomial name
- Euxoa tessellata (Harris, 1841)

Synonyms
- Agrotis tessellata Harris, 1841; Mamestra insulsa Walker, 1856; Agrotis insignata Walker, [1857]; Agrotis perlentans Walker, [1857]; Agrotis maizi (Fitch, 1864); Agrotis atropurpurea Grote, 1877; Agrotis tesselloides Grote, 1882; Agrotis finis Smith, 1888; Agrotis remota Smith, 1890; Carneades flaviscapula Smith, 1900; Carneades noctuiformis Smith, 1900; Carneades neotelis Smith, 1900; Carneades atrofusca Smith, 1900; Carneades objurgata Smith, 1900; Carneades cariosus Smith, 1900; Carneades nordica Smith, 1900; Carneades caesia Smith, 1900; Carneades acutifrons Smith, 1900; Carneades laminis Smith, 1900; Euxoa marinensis McDunnough, 1941; Euxoa caesia Smith, 1900; Euxoa cariosa Smith, 1900

= Euxoa tessellata =

Species of moth

Euxoa tessellata, the tessellate dart or striped cutworm is a moth of the family Noctuidae. It is the most widespread Euxoa-species in North America. It is found from Newfoundland to Alaska, south in the west to California, Arizona, New Mexico, south in the east to Florida. It seems to be absent from Texas and adjacent eastern states.

The wingspan is 30–38 mm. Adults are on wing from June to September.

The larvae feed on tobacco, various garden crops, as well as the leaves of apple, cherry and pear.

The tessellata GROUP in North America consists of two species - E. tessellata and E. plagigera. The two species are dissimilar in appearance, but are related by genital features Lepidoptera genitalia. They will hybridize in the lab, but the result is a sterile offspring.
