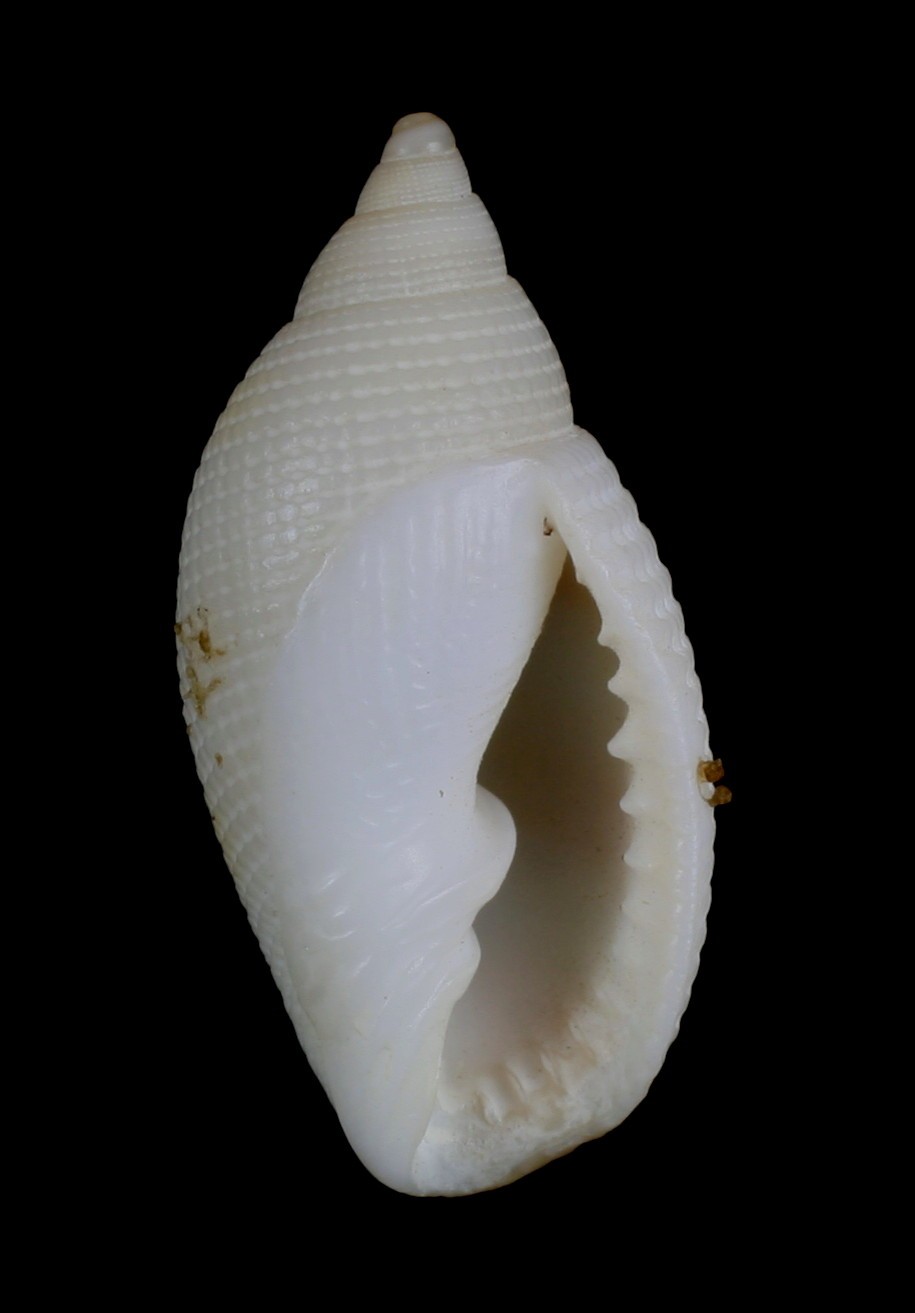
- Apertural view of shell of Aphera tessellata (Sowerby, 1832)

Scientific classification
- Kingdom: Animalia
- Phylum: Mollusca
- Class: Gastropoda
- Subclass: Caenogastropoda
- Order: Neogastropoda
- Family: Cancellariidae
- Genus: Aphera
- Species: A. tessellata

Binomial name
- Aphera tessellata (G.B. Sowerby I, 1832a)

Synonyms
- Cancellaria tessellata G.B. Sowerby I, 1832a

= Aphera tessellata =

Species of gastropod

Aphera tessellata is a species of sea snail, a marine gastropod mollusk in the family Cancellariidae, the nutmeg snails.
