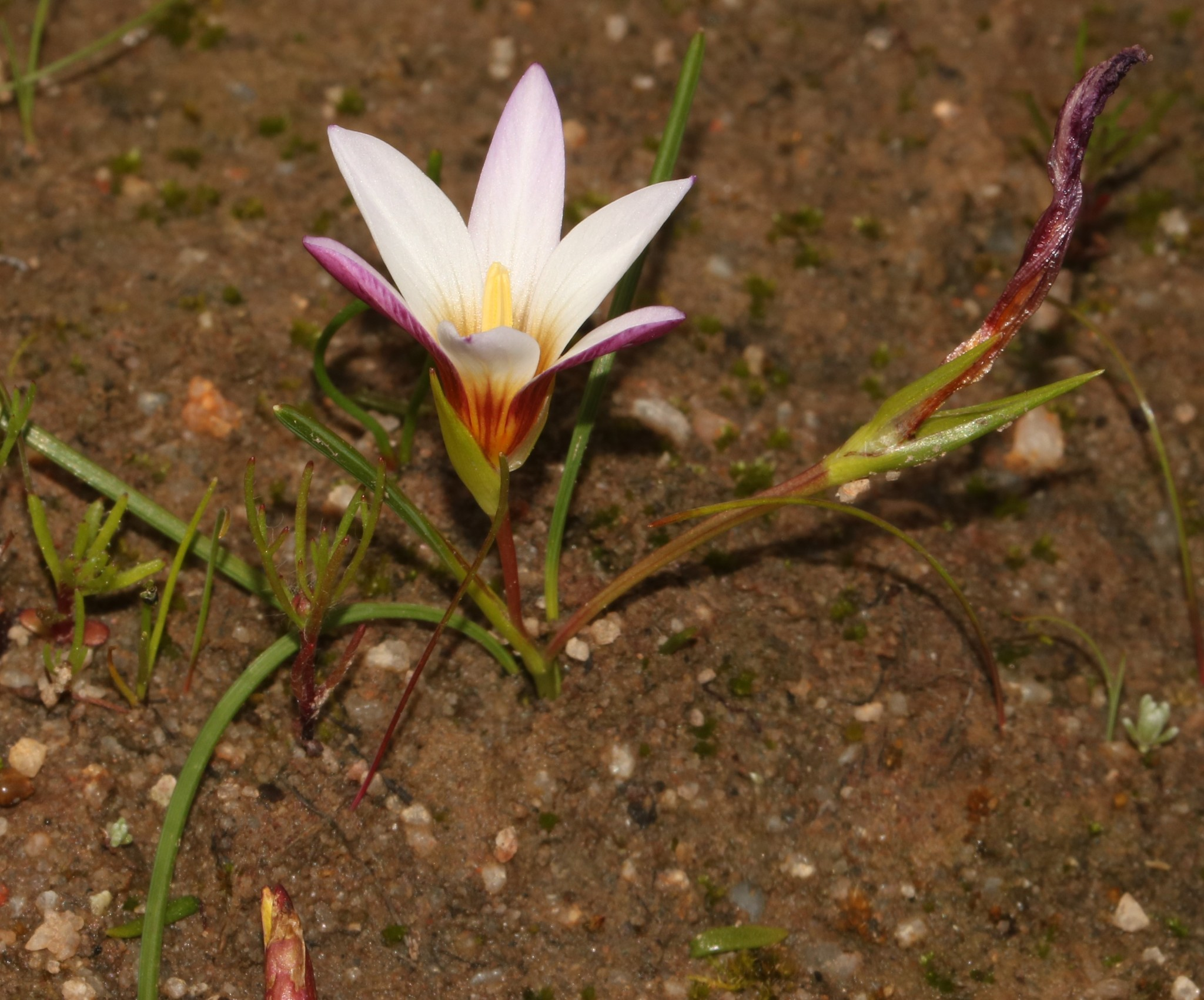

Scientific classification
- Kingdom: Plantae
- Clade: Tracheophytes
- Clade: Angiosperms
- Clade: Monocots
- Order: Asparagales
- Family: Iridaceae
- Genus: Romulea
- Species: R. toximontana

Binomial name
- Romulea toximontana M.P.de Vos

= Romulea toximontana =

Species of flowering plant

Romulea toximontana is low a herbaceous perennial geophyte in the family Iridaceae native to South Africa. It has a small corm in the soil, several linear leaves, white trimerous flowers, yolk-yellow near the centre and with a purple wash on the outside. The 1997 IUCN Red List of Threatened Plants lists this species as rare.

== Taxonomy ==
Romulea toximontana was described by South African botanist and expert in bulbous plants Miriam de Vos in 1972. It has been assigned to the section Ciliatae, a part of the subgenus Spatalanthus.

== Description ==
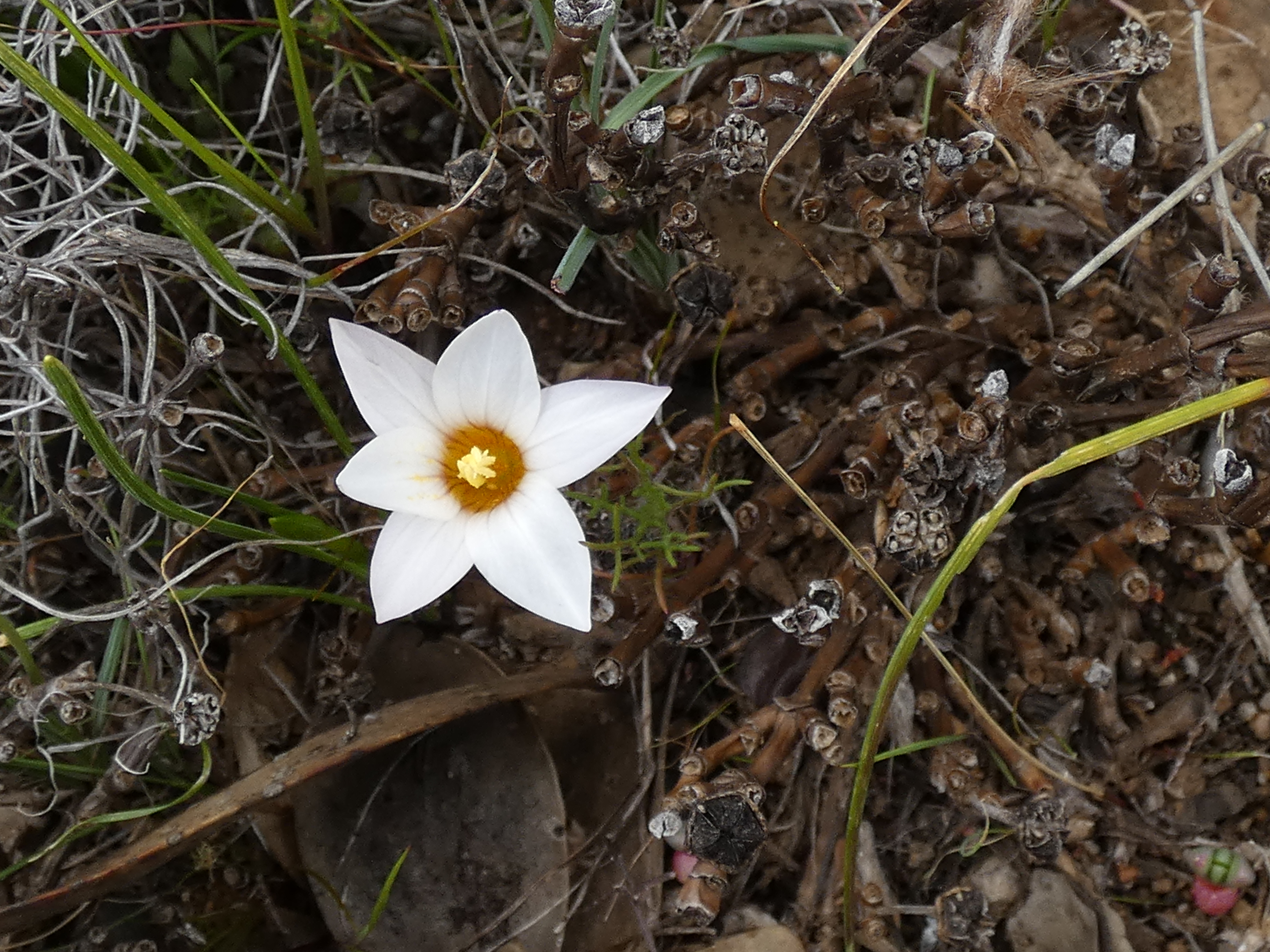
seen from above

Romulea toximontana is a low perennial plant of 10–25 cm (3.9–9.8 in) high, that survives the dry southern summer through storage of its resources in an oval corm. This corm is flattened obliquely and has a wide, fan-shaped ridge on the underside. Its stem may be entirely underground or reach a height of 10 cm (3.9 in). The two lower leaves are about 1 mm (0.039 in) in diameter, have four narrow grooves along their length, and sometimes rows of very small, evenly spaced hairs (or ciliate). Each flower is subtended by two bracts. The outer bract has a narrow papery margin, while the inner one has a wide papery margin with a brown edge. The flowers do not smell and are white on the inside, yolk yellow near the centre, and have a purple wash on the outside of the six elliptic tepals of 13–22 mm (0.51–0.87 in) long. The stamens consist of 3–5 mm (0.12–0.20 in) long filaments topped by 4–6 mm (0.16–0.24 in) long anthers. When the fruit is ripe the flower stalk spreads widely. This species flowers in August.

=== Differences with related species ===
R. toximontana and R. montana share the same type of corm, both having a very broad ridge on their underside, and fruiting stems spread out. R. montana however has yellow flowers with dark blotches or streaks in the throat while in R. toximontana the white flowers are yellow down the cup, while the outside of the tepals is purple. R. toximontana can be confused with R. sladenii because it also has white flowers and grows in the same environment on the Gifberg. The stamens of R. sladenii rise just beyond the floral cup whereas the stamens in R. toximontana are entirely contained. To be absolutely certain of the identification, the corms need to be examined. R. sladenii has symmetrical, bell-shaped corms with a lacerated ridge on the bottom, where R. toximontana has obliquely flattened corms and a wide, fan-shaped ridge.

== Distribution ==
Romulea toximontana is only known from a small area on the Bokkeveld plateau, the Gifberg and the Matsikamma Mountains, all near Vanrhynsdorp.

== Ecology ==
Romulea toximontana grows on sandy soils and weathered sandstone.
