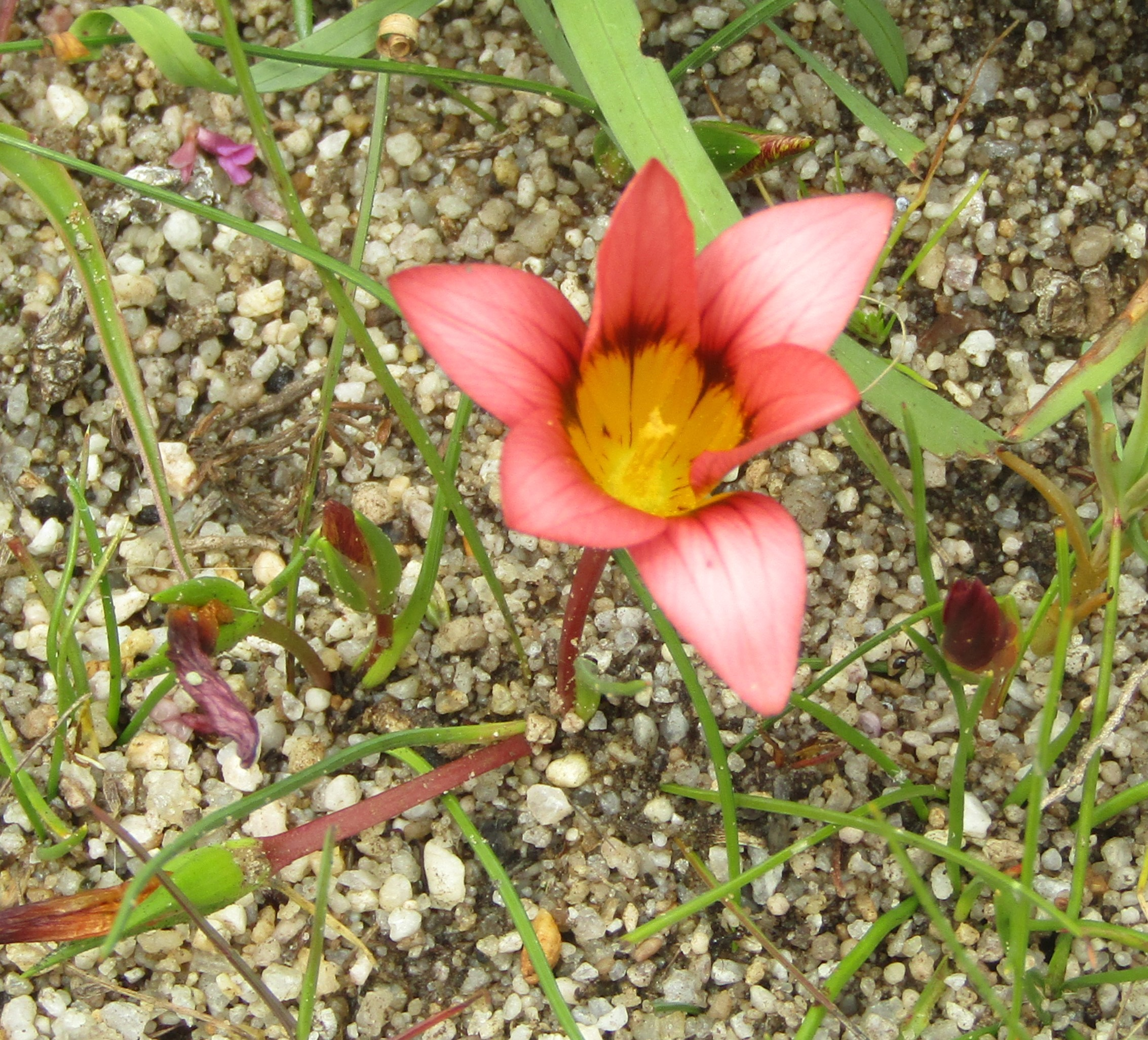

Scientific classification
- Kingdom: Plantae
- Clade: Tracheophytes
- Clade: Angiosperms
- Clade: Monocots
- Order: Asparagales
- Family: Iridaceae
- Genus: Romulea
- Species: R. hirsuta

Binomial name
- Romulea hirsuta (Steud. ex Klatt) Eckl. ex Baker

Synonyms
- Trichonema hirsutum Steud. ex Klatt

= Romulea hirsuta =

South African plant species

Romulea hirsuta is a geophyte from South Africa. It has pink flowers with dark marks at the edges of the yellow center.

== Description ==
Romulea hirsuta is a cormous plant which grows to a height of 6–30 cm (2.4–11.8 in) tall. The stem may be found underground or be up to 20 cm (7.9 in) tall. It has between two and six basal leaves that usually grow along the stem. They have four grooves and may be ciliate. The bell-shaped corm is symmetrical and has a fibrous basal rim.

Unscented flowers are present in August and September. They are usually pink or red in colour and frequently have darker markings around the yellow cup in the center. The tepals range between 15 and 35 mm (0.59 and 1.38 in) in length. The coppery orange coloured population found growing on mountains between Clanwilliam and Hermanus lack the darker markings around the center. These flowers may resemble Romulea triflora.

== Distribution and habitat ==
This species is endemic to the Western Cape of South Africa. It is widely distributed in the region, where it is found growing between Clanwilliam and the Agulhas Peninsula. It prefers sandy and granite substrates, but may sometimes be found growing on clay.

== Ecology ==
This species is insect pollinated and is most frequently visited by monkey beetles. Two important pollinators in Darling are Lepisia rupicola (a species of monkey beetle) and an unidentified species of colletid bee. While the former visits more frequently, the latter carries a higher pollen load.
