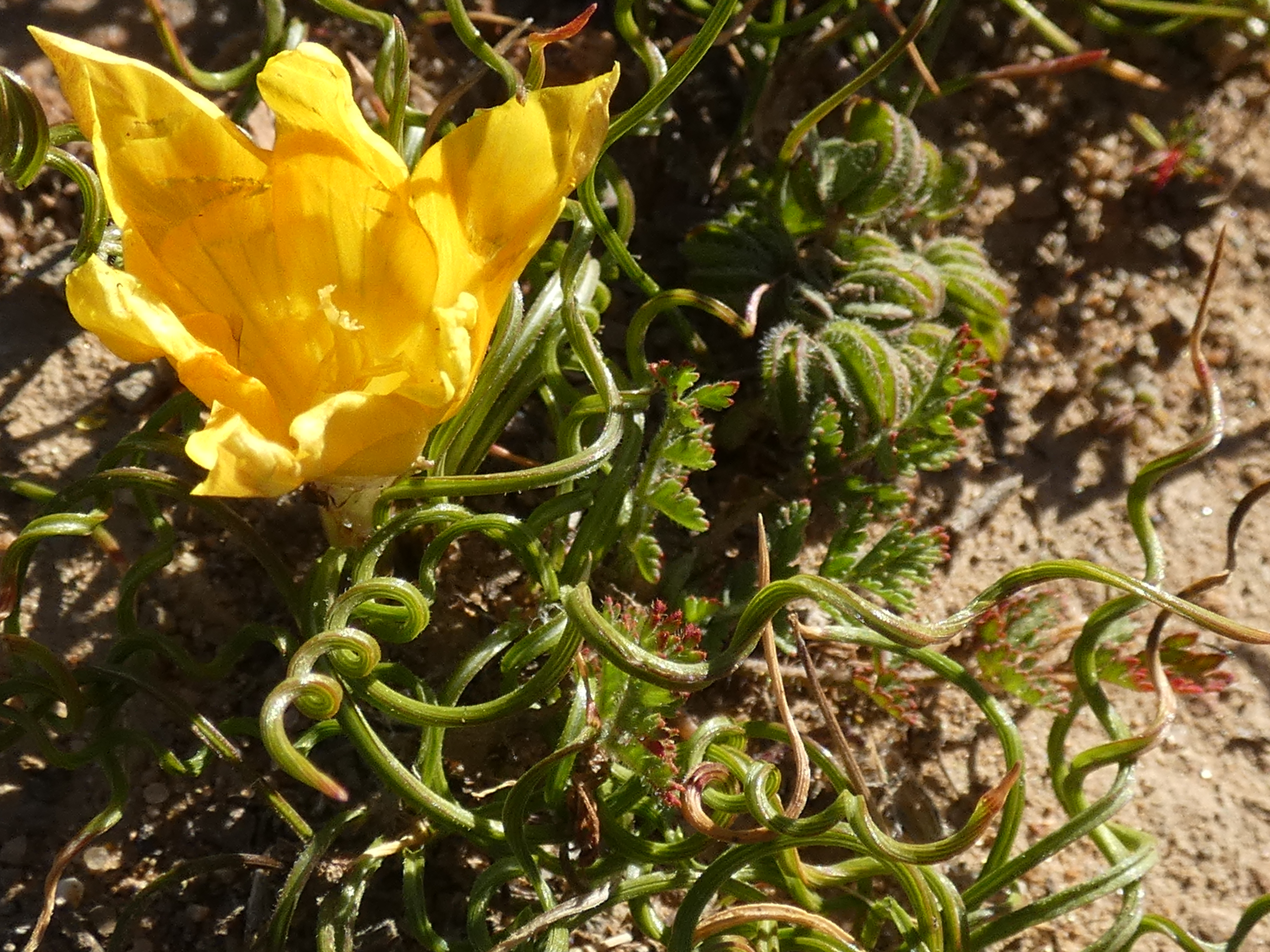

Scientific classification
- Kingdom: Plantae
- Clade: Tracheophytes
- Clade: Angiosperms
- Clade: Monocots
- Order: Asparagales
- Family: Iridaceae
- Genus: Romulea
- Species: R. tortuosa

Binomial name
- Romulea tortuosa (Licht. ex Roem. & Schult.) Baker

Synonyms
- Bulbocodium tortuosum; Ixia tortuosa; Romulea tridentifera; Trichotoma tortuosa

= Romulea tortuosa =

Species of flowering plant

Romulea tortuosa is a herbaceous perennial geophyte in the family Iridaceae native to South Africa. It has a small corm in the soil, a few prostrate coiling leaves, and fragrant, trimerous yellow flowers, sometimes with six brown blotches on the inside near the bottom of the flower.

== Description ==
Romulea tortuosa is a very low perennial plant of 3–6 cm (1.2–2.4 in) high, that survives the dry southern summer through storage of its resources in an oval corm, which is clad in a brown, rigid tunic. Its three to four spreading, firm, awl-shaped basal leaves are coiled like corkscrews, 3¾–5 cm (1½–2 in) long, about 1 mm (0.04 in) in diameter, with three veins. Two or three flowers appear almost without a stem from the base of the leaves. Each flower is subtended by two green lanceolate non-coiling bracts of 1¼ cm (½ in) long. The bright yellow perianth, that consists of six tepals, which are merged near their base, forms a short tube at its base, and a cup of 1¼ cm (½ in) high, with egg-shaped lobes. The anthers are in the upper half of the cup and narrowly arrow-shaped. The typical subspecies (R. tortuosa subsp. tortuosa) has brown blotches near the bottom of the flower cup, which are absent in R. tortuosa subsp. aurea. The opened flower smells like the Narcissus blossom.

== Taxonomy ==
This species was first described by Hinrich Lichtenstein in 1817 as Ixia tortuosa. In 1827, John Bellenden Ker Gawler thought it better placed in Trichonema, while John Gilbert Baker created the new combination Romulea tortuosa in 1877, which was not supported by Otto Kuntze, who moved it to the genus Bulbocodium in 1891. Friedrich Wilhelm Klatt described another specimen in 1882, calling it Romulea tridentifera, but this name is now considered to be synonymous to R. tortuosa. Klatt also described Romulea aurea, that was later reduced to R. tortuosa subsp. aurea by M.P. de Vos in 1972.

== Ecology ==
Romulea tortuosa is mostly visited by common honey bees and other bee species such as from the sweat bee family, but sometimes also by the monkey beetle Lepithrix forsteri.
