= T. roseum =

T. roseum may refer to:

- Trichonema roseum, a synonym for Romulea rosea, a herbaceous perennial species
- Trichothecium roseum, a plant pathogen species
