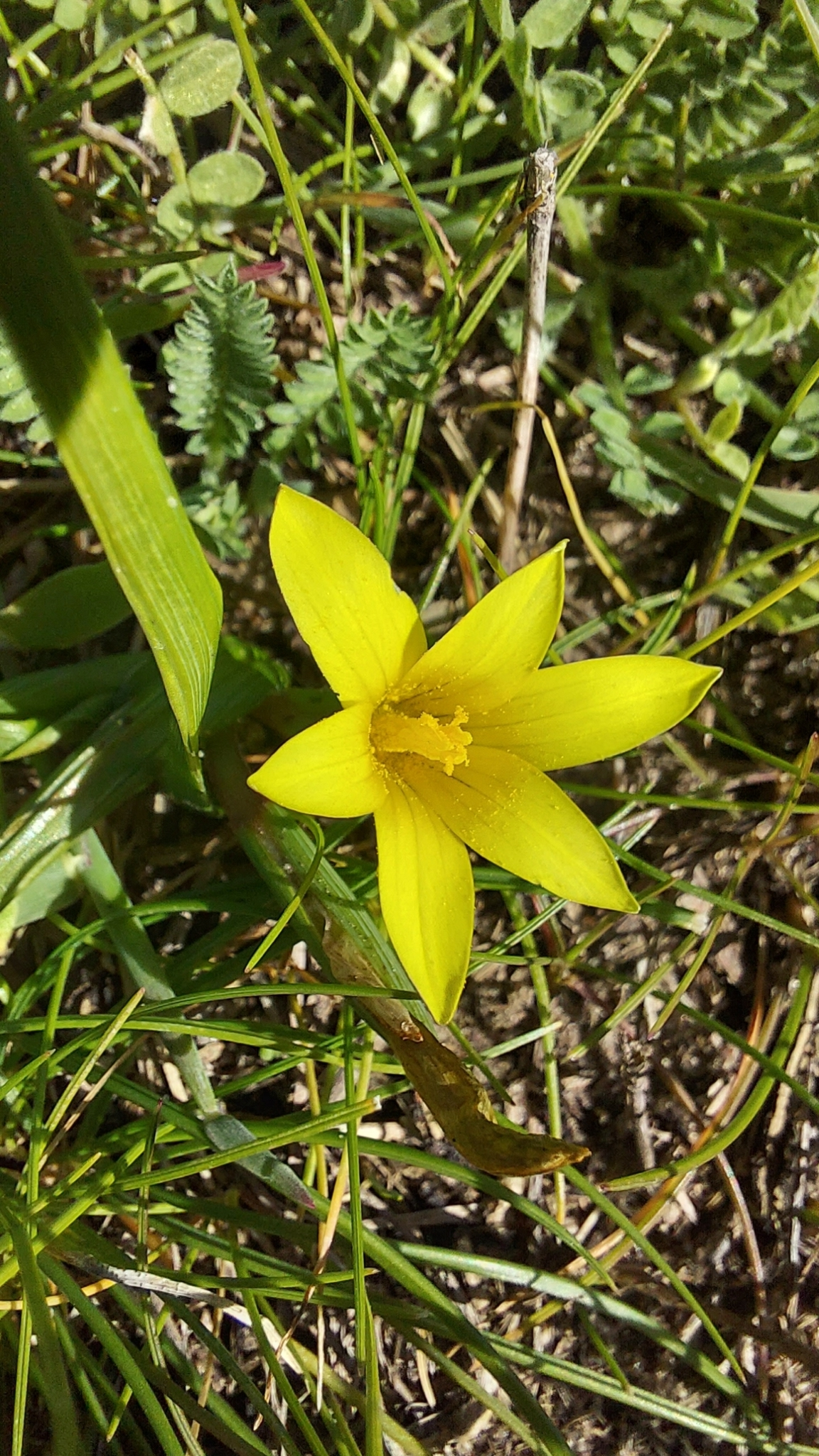

Scientific classification
- Kingdom: Plantae
- Clade: Tracheophytes
- Clade: Angiosperms
- Clade: Monocots
- Order: Asparagales
- Family: Iridaceae
- Genus: Romulea
- Species: R. flava

Binomial name
- Romulea flava (Lam.) M.P.de Vos

Synonyms
- List: Bulbocodium flavum (Lam.) Kuntze; Ixia flava Lam.; Bulbocodium arenarium (Eckl.) Kuntze; Bulbocodium latifolium (Baker) Kuntze; Bulbocodium simile (Eckl.) Kuntze; Geissorhiza recurvifolia (Poir.) Klatt; Ixia bulbocodium Thunb.; Ixia recurva Redouté; Ixia recurvifolia Poir.; Ixia reflexa Thunb.; Romulea arenaria Eckl.; Romulea bachmannii Bég.; Romulea bulbocodioides Baker; Romulea bulbocodioides var. elongata Thunb. ex Baker; Romulea bulbocodioides var. latifolia (Baker) Bég.; Romulea bulbocodioides var. minor Bég.; Romulea bulbocodioides var. viridiflora Bég.; Romulea candida (Ten.) Ten.; Romulea caulescens (Ker Gawl.) Klatt; Romulea cruciata var. hirsuta Bég.; Romulea flava var. hirsuta (Bég.) M.P.de Vos; Romulea flava var. minor (Bég.) M.P.de Vos; Romulea flava var. viridiflora (Bég.) M.P.de Vos; Romulea latifolia Baker; Romulea recurva (Spreng.) Eckl.; Romulea reflexa Eckl.; Romulea rosea var. reflexa (Eckl.) Bég.; Romulea similis Eckl.; Romulea vulgaris Eckl.; Trichonema arenarium Steud.; Trichonema candidum Ten.; Trichonema caulescens Ker Gawl.; Trichonema hypoxidiflorum Salisb.; Trichonema latifolium Herb. ex Baker; Trichonema recurvifolium (Poir.) Ker Gawl.; Trichonema recurvum Spreng.; Trichonema reflexum (Eckl.) Steud.; Trichonema simile (Eckl.) Steud.

= Romulea flava =

Species of flowering plant

Romulea flava, also known by its common name greenbract froetang, is a species of flowering plant in the iris family Iridaceae.

The plant is native to the Cape Provinces and has been introduced into Australian states of New South Wales, Victoria and Western Australia.

It grows to a height of 10 to 15 cm and has flowers that are white or yellow on the outside with an inner yellow cup. The flowers only open on days that are warn and sunny and usually only in the afternoon.

It has four accepted Infraspecifics :

- Romulea flava var. flava (Lam.) M.P.de Vos
- Romulea flava var. minor (Bég.) M.P.de Vos
- Romulea flava var. hirsuta (Bég.) M.P.de Vos
- Romulea flava var. viridiflora (Bég.) M.P.de Vos
