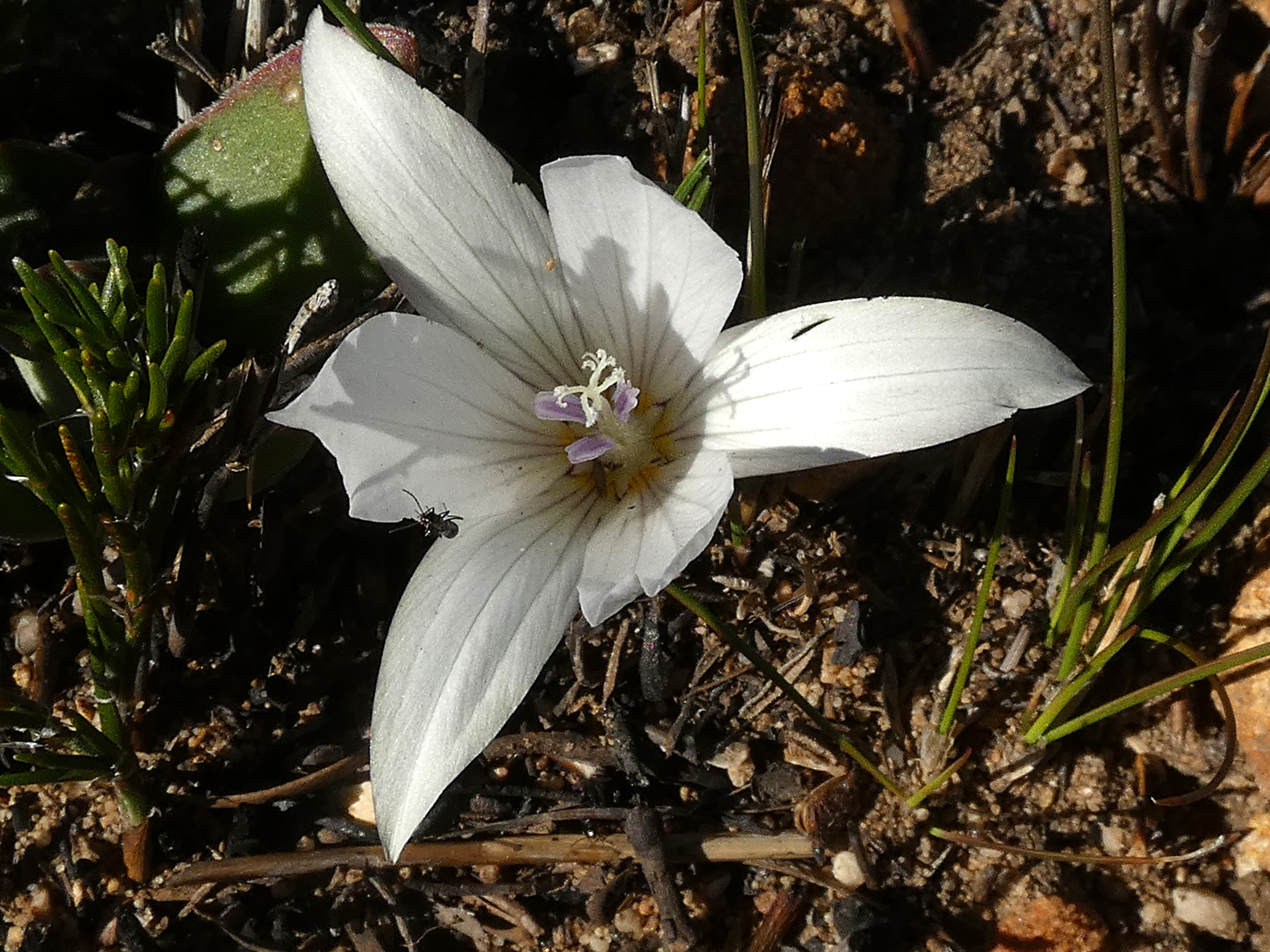

Scientific classification
- Kingdom: Plantae
- Clade: Tracheophytes
- Clade: Angiosperms
- Clade: Monocots
- Order: Asparagales
- Family: Iridaceae
- Genus: Romulea
- Species: R. viridibracteata

Binomial name
- Romulea viridibracteata M.P.de Vos

= Romulea viridibracteata =

Species of flowering plant

Romulea viridibracteata is a herbaceous perennial tuberous geophyte in the family Iridaceae. It is native to Pakhuis Pass in the Western Cape Province of South Africa.
