= Lepisia braunsi =

Scientific classification
- Kingdom: Animalia
- Phylum: Arthropoda
- Class: Insecta
- Order: Coleoptera
- Suborder: Polyphaga
- Infraorder: Scarabaeiformia
- Family: Scarabaeidae
- Genus: Lepisia
- Species: L. braunsi

Binomial name
- Lepisia braunsi Schein, 1956

Synonyms
- Lepisia braunsi olivacea Schein, 1956

Species of beetle

Lepisia braunsi is a species of beetle of the family Scarabaeidae. It is found in South Africa (Western Cape).

== Description ==
Adults reach a length of about 8–10.5 mm (0.31–0.41 in). They ground colour is shiny deep black. The whole body (except the head) is covered with dull scales. Males have orange-red scales on the pronotum and elytra, while these scales are dark yellow in females. The head, pronotum, pygidium and abdomen have erect, yellowish hairs, while the elytra have longer golden-yellow hairs.
