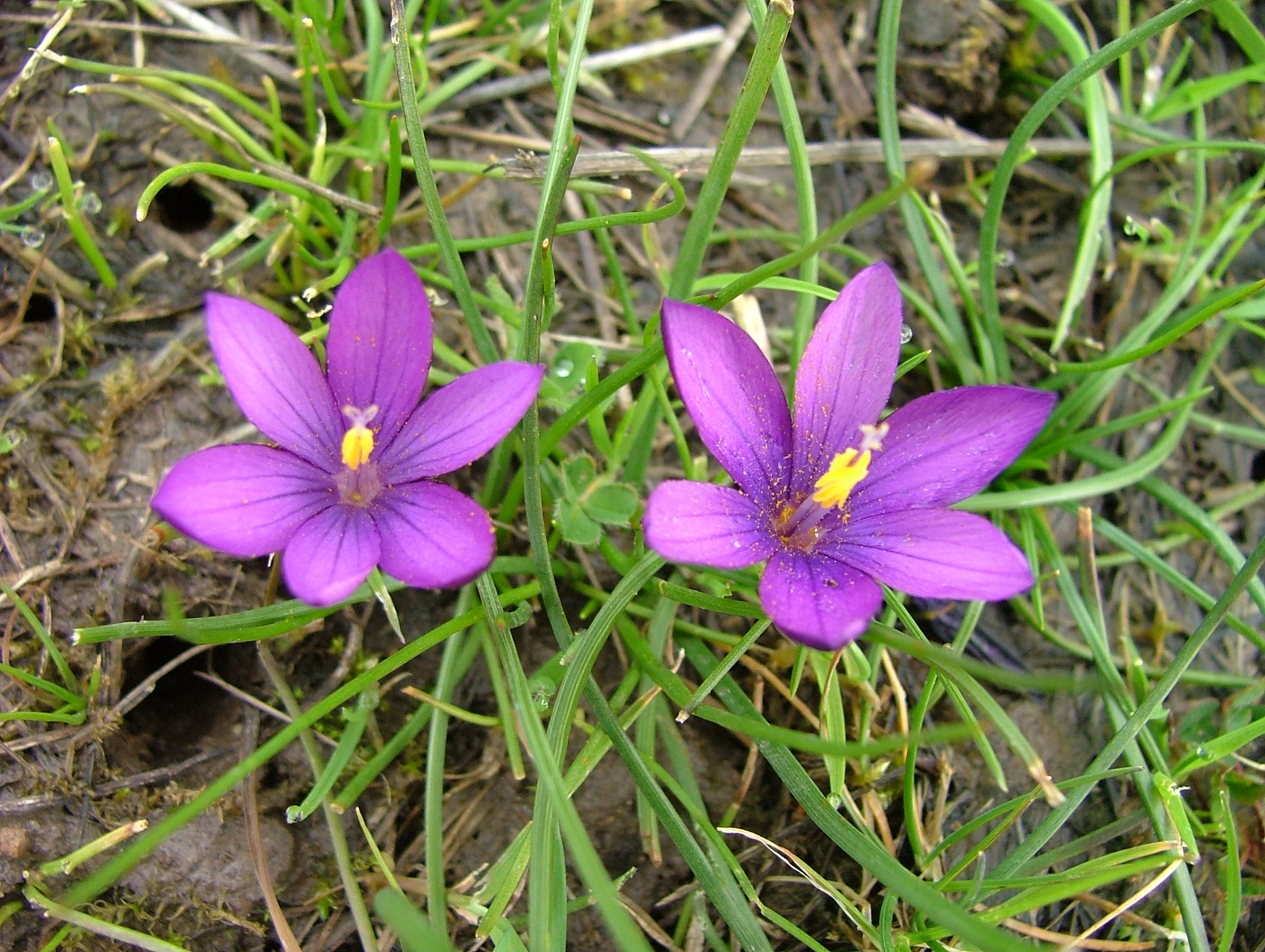
- Close-up of flowers
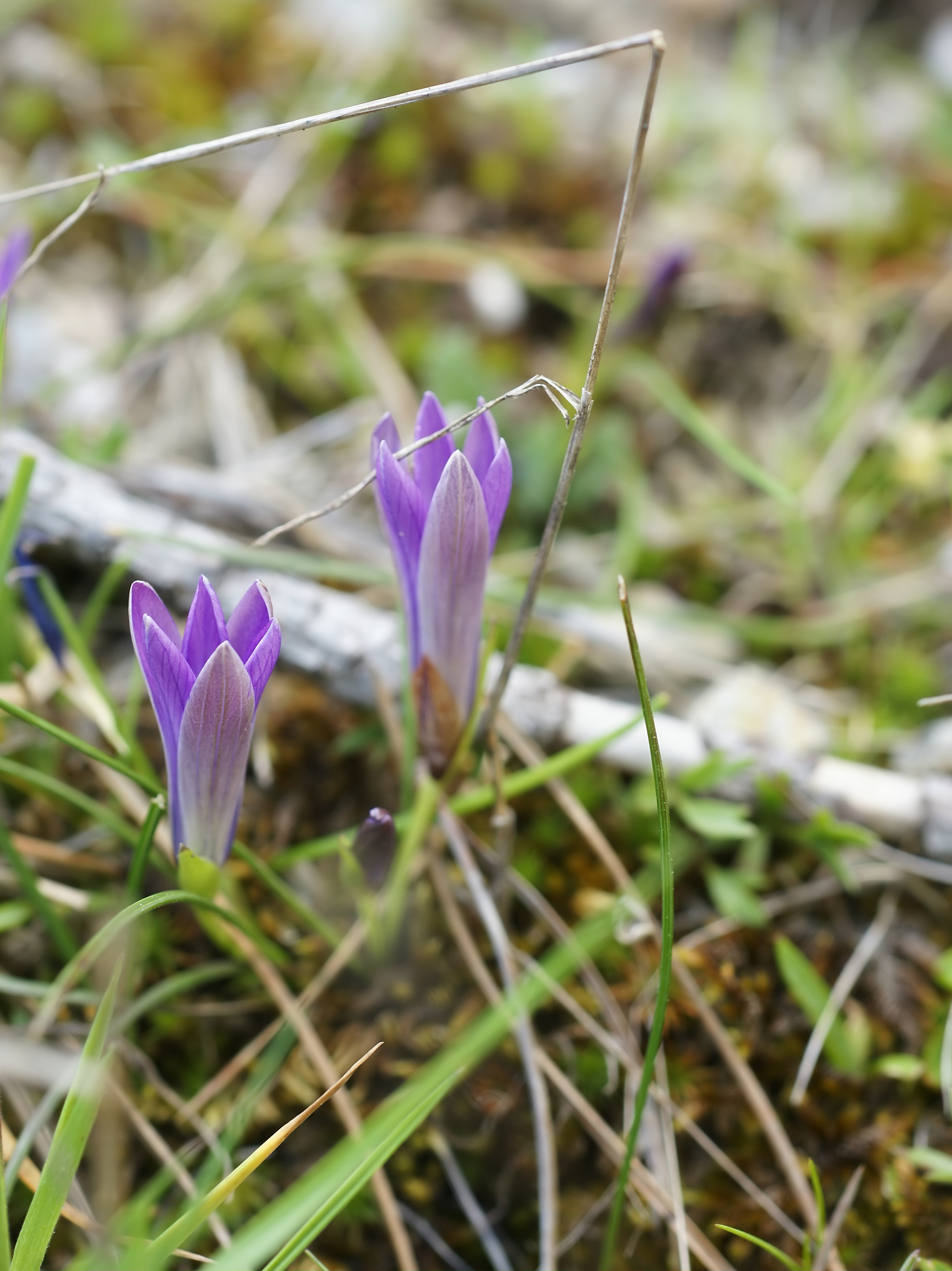
- Side view of flowers

Conservation status
- Least Concern (IUCN 3.1)

Scientific classification
- Kingdom: Plantae
- Clade: Embryophytes
- Clade: Tracheophytes
- Clade: Angiosperms
- Clade: Monocots
- Order: Asparagales
- Family: Iridaceae
- Genus: Romulea
- Species: R. requienii

Binomial name
- Romulea requienii Parl.

Synonyms
- Bulbocodium requienii (Parl.) Kuntze; Romulea atroviolacea Jord.; Romulea requienii var. parviflora Bég.

= Romulea requienii =

Species of plant

Romulea requienii, called Requien's romulea, is a species of flowering plant in the family Iridaceae. It is native to Corsica, Sardinia, and west-central Italy. A petite cormous geophyte, it is prefers to grow in wet areas such as coastal grasslands and inland meadows from sea level to 1,200 m (3,900 ft). It has been assessed as Least Concern, although the Tuscan population may have been extirpated. It is occasionally available from commercial nurseries.

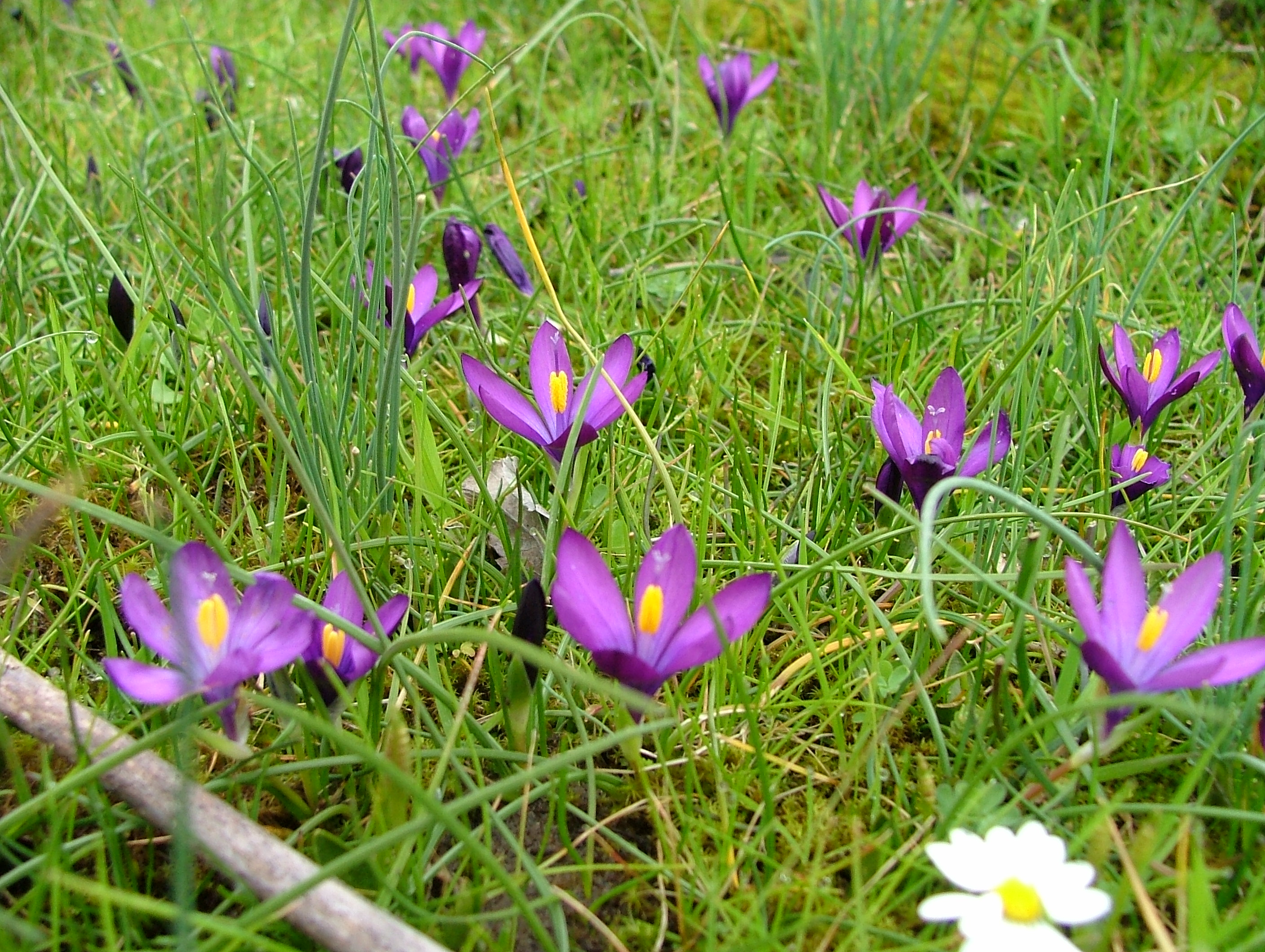
A grouping
