= Romulea melitensis =

Scientific classification
- Kingdom: Plantae
- Clade: Tracheophytes
- Clade: Angiosperms
- Clade: Monocots
- Order: Asparagales
- Family: Iridaceae
- Genus: Romulea
- Species: R. melitensis

Binomial name
- Romulea melitensis Bég

Species of plant

Romulea melitensis is a species of plant in the family Iridaceae. It is endemic to Malta.

== Sources ==
This article incorporates text from a free content work. Licensed under CC0 (license statement/permission). Text taken from Romulea melitensis. Encyclopedia of Life.
