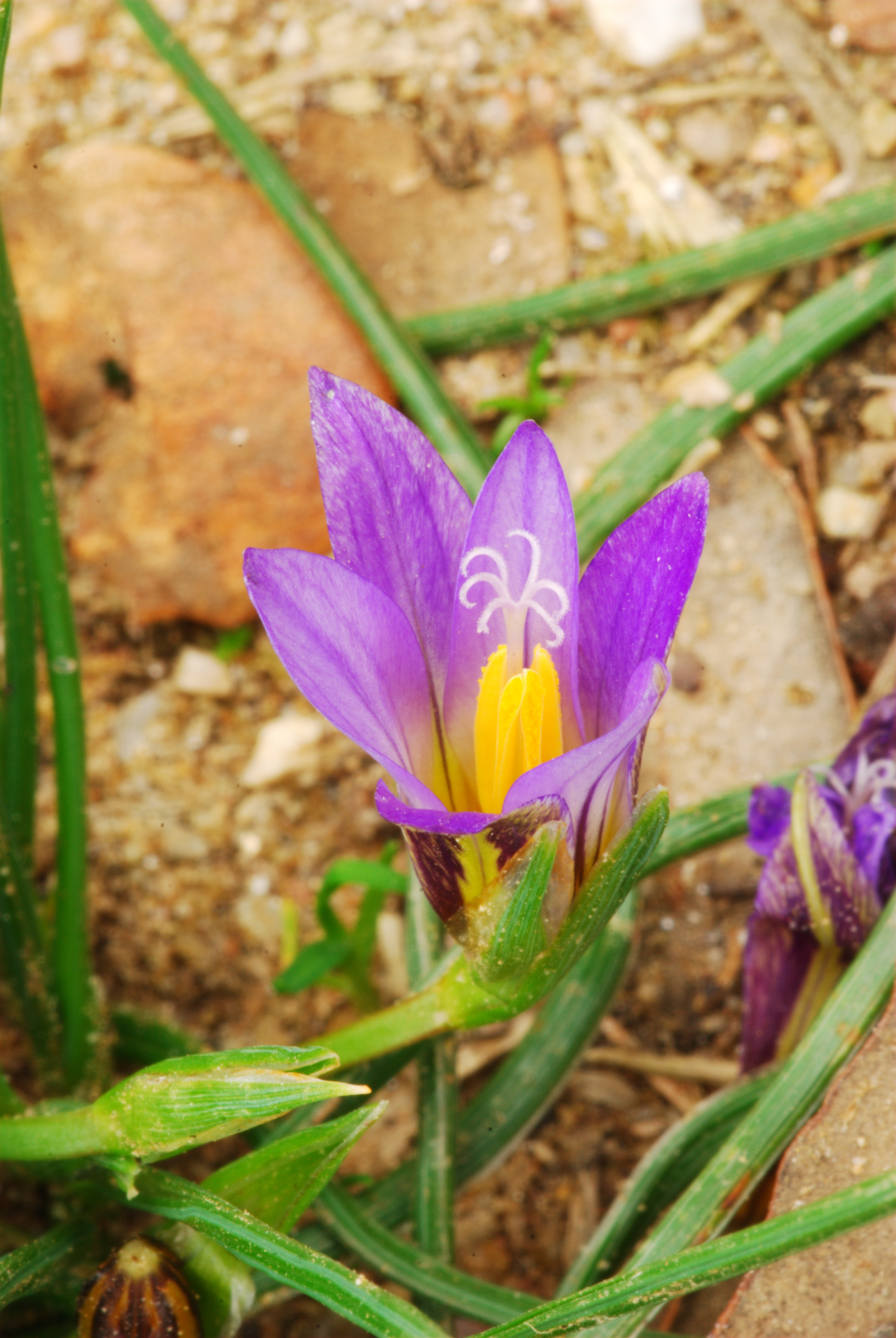

Scientific classification
- Kingdom: Plantae
- Clade: Tracheophytes
- Clade: Angiosperms
- Clade: Monocots
- Order: Asparagales
- Family: Iridaceae
- Genus: Romulea
- Species: R. bulbocodium

Binomial name
- Romulea bulbocodium (L.) Sebast. & Mauri

= Romulea bulbocodium =

Species of flowering plant

Romulea bulbocodium is one of the best-known species from the genus Romulea. The plant, a member of the family Iridaceae, is native to the Mediterranean region (southern Europe, northern Africa, the Middle East) and Sudan. It has many varieties and is occasionally used as ornamental plant.

The species has a small rootstock - a corm which can be found in sandy and rocky soils. It produces long and slender leaves. The plant looks much like the popular Crocus.

The blooms are small and with six tepals. Most varieties have purple or violet blooms, but white or yellow also occur.

The ovary is 3-locular and the seeds are brown, pellet-like, circular grains.
