= Romulea cruciata =

Scientific classification
- Kingdom: Plantae
- Clade: Tracheophytes
- Clade: Angiosperms
- Clade: Monocots
- Order: Asparagales
- Family: Iridaceae
- Genus: Romulea
- Species: R. cruciata

Binomial name
- Romulea cruciata (Jacq.) Bég.

Species of flowering plant

Romulea cruciata is a herbaceous perennial in the family Iridaceae. It is endemic to the Cape Province in South Africa.
