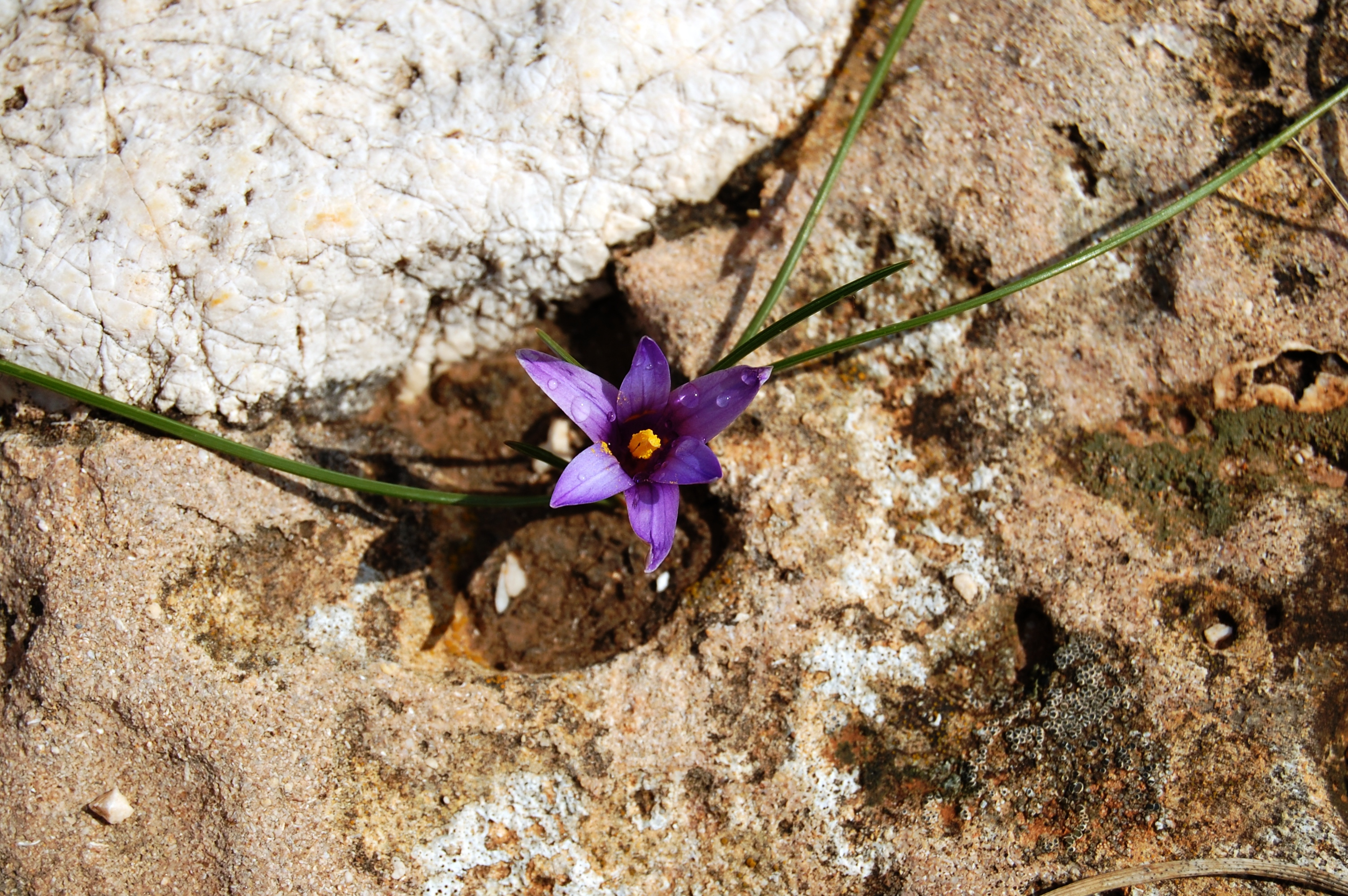

Scientific classification
- Kingdom: Plantae
- Clade: Tracheophytes
- Clade: Angiosperms
- Clade: Monocots
- Order: Asparagales
- Family: Iridaceae
- Genus: Romulea
- Species: R. linaresii

Binomial name
- Romulea linaresii Parl.

= Romulea linaresii =

Species of plant

Romulea linaresii is a species of plant in the family Iridaceae. It occurs in many countries around the Mediterranean Sea.

== Source ==
This article incorporates text from a free content work. Licensed under CC0 (license statement/permission). Text taken from Romulea linaresii. Encyclopedia of Life.
