= Lepisia gaerdesi =

Scientific classification
- Kingdom: Animalia
- Phylum: Arthropoda
- Class: Insecta
- Order: Coleoptera
- Suborder: Polyphaga
- Infraorder: Scarabaeiformia
- Family: Scarabaeidae
- Genus: Lepisia
- Species: L. gaerdesi

Binomial name
- Lepisia gaerdesi Schein, 1956

Species of beetle

Lepisia gaerdesi is a species of beetle of the family Scarabaeidae. It is found in Namibia and South Africa (Northern Cape).

== Description ==
Adults reach a length of about 9–10 mm (0.35–0.39 in). The ground colour of the head and pronotum is glossy black, while the rest of the body and legs are brown. They have uniformly yellowish or brownish coloured scales on hairless elytra.
