= Tuber =

Storage organ in plants

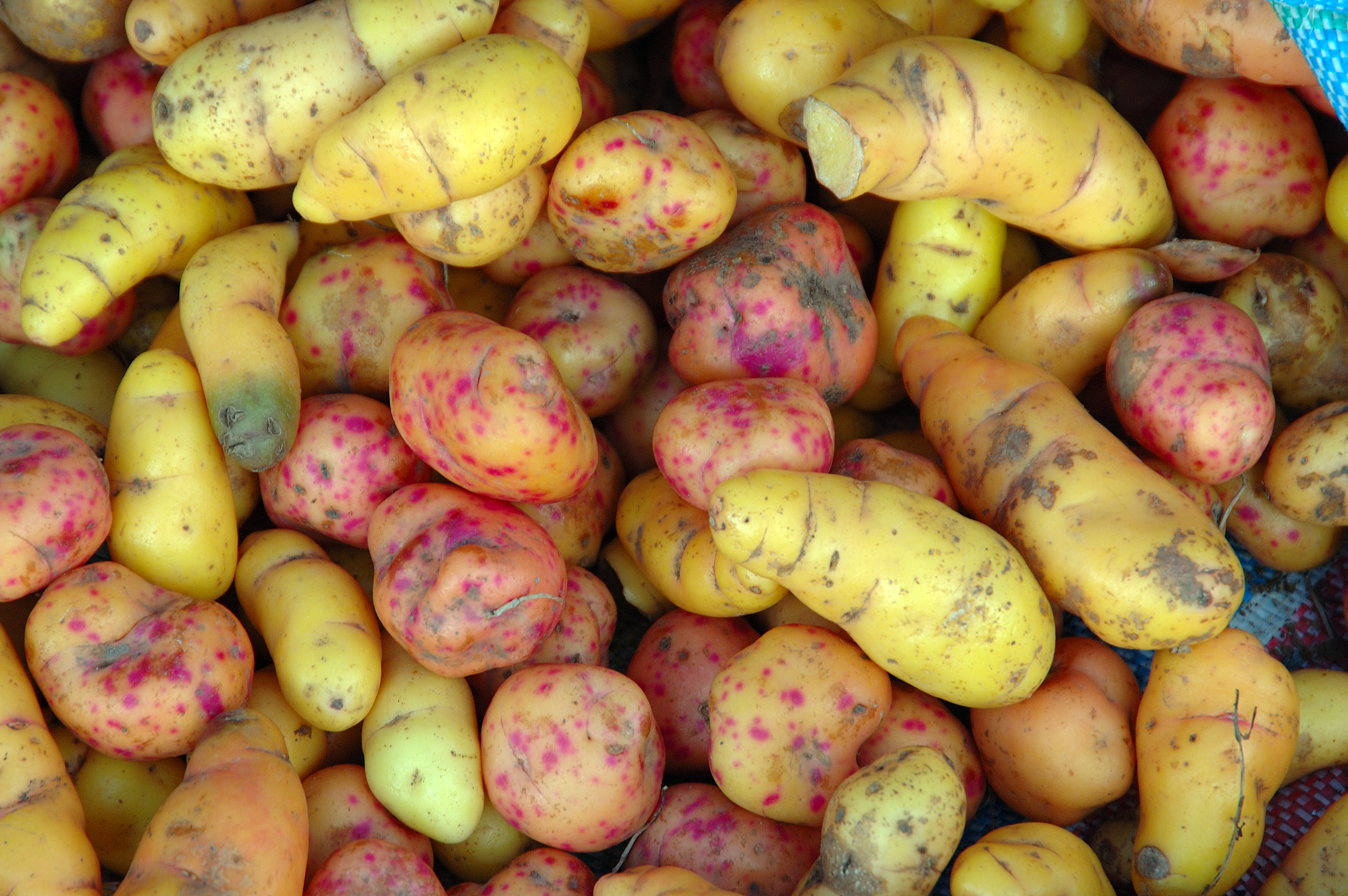
Ulluku (Ullucus tuberosus) tubers

Tubers are a type of enlarged structure that plants use as storage organs for nutrients, derived from stems or roots. Tubers help plants perennate (survive winter or dry months), provide energy and nutrients, and are a means of asexual reproduction.

Stem tubers manifest as thickened rhizomes (underground stems) or stolons (horizontal connections between organisms); examples include the potato and yam. The term root tuber describes modified lateral roots, as in sweet potato, cassava, and dahlia.

== Terminology ==
The term originates from the Latin tuber, meaning 'lump, bump, or swelling'.

Some writers limit the definition of tuber to structures derived from stems, while others also apply the term to structures derived from roots.

Roots and tubers yield

Per capita production of roots and tubers

== Stem tubers ==
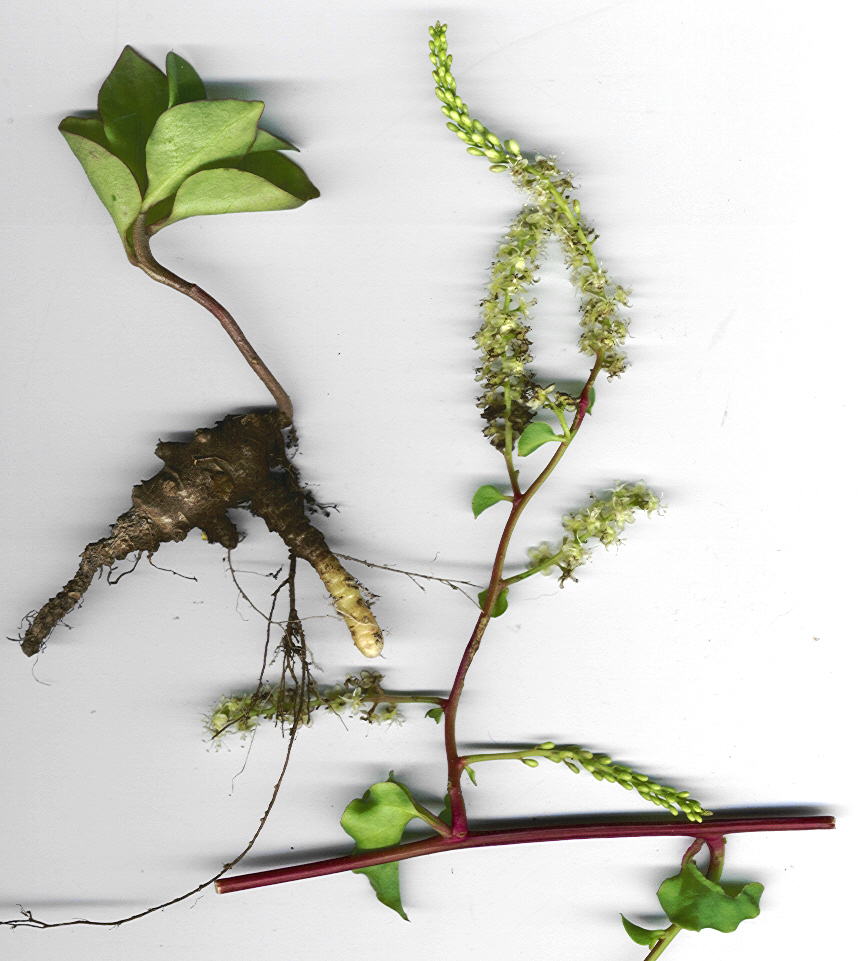
Flowers and tuber of Anredera cordifolia

A stem tuber forms from thickened rhizomes or stolons. The top sides of the tuber produce shoots that grow into typical stems and leaves and the undersides produce roots. They tend to form at the sides of the parent plant and are most often located near the soil surface. The underground tuber is normally a short-lived storage and regenerative organ developing from a shoot that branches off a mature plant. The offspring or new tubers are attached to a parent tuber or form at the end of a hypogeogenous (initiated below ground) rhizome. In the autumn the plant dies, except for the new offspring tubers, which have one dominant bud that in spring regrows a new shoot producing stems and leaves; in summer the tubers decay and new tubers begin to grow. Some plants also form smaller tubers or tubercules that act like seeds, producing small plants that resemble (in morphology and size) seedlings. Some stem tubers are long-lived, such as those of tuberous begonias, but many plants have tubers that survive only until the plants have fully leafed out, at which point the tuber is reduced to a shriveled-up husk.

Stem tubers generally start off as enlargements of the hypocotyl section of a seedling, but sometimes also include the first node or two of the epicotyl and the upper section of the root. The tuber has a vertical orientation, with one or a few vegetative buds on the top and fibrous roots produced on the bottom from a basal section. Typically the tuber has an oblong rounded shape.

Tuberous begonias, yams, and cyclamens are commonly grown stem tubers. Mignonette vine (Anredera cordifolia) produces aerial stem tubers on 3.5-to-7.5-metre-tall (12 to 25 ft) vines; the tubers fall to the ground and grow. Plectranthus esculentus, of the mint family Lamiaceae, produces tuberous underground organs from the base of the stem, weighing up to 1.8 kg (3 lb 15 oz) per tuber, forming from axillary buds producing short stolons that grow into tubers. Even though legumes are not commonly associated with forming stem tubers, Lathyrus tuberosus is an example native to Asia and Europe, where it was once grown as a crop.

=== Potatoes ===
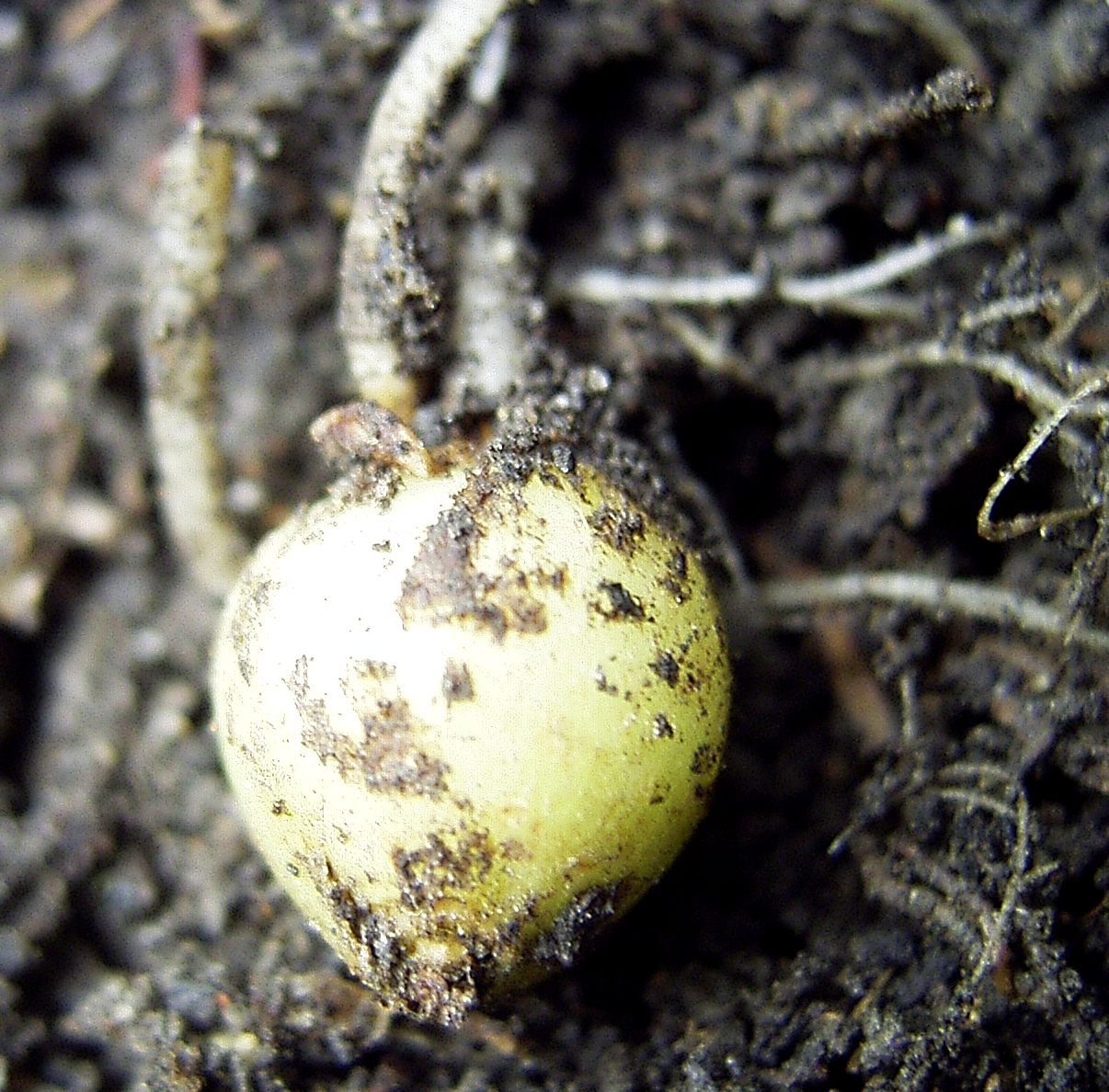
A young potato tuber

Potatoes are stem tubers – enlarged stolons thicken to develop into storage organs. The tuber has all the parts of a normal stem, including nodes and internodes. The nodes are the eyes and each has a leaf scar. The nodes or eyes are arranged around the tuber in a spiral fashion beginning on the end opposite the attachment point to the stolon. The terminal bud is produced at the farthest point away from the stolon attachment and tubers, and thus show the same apical dominance as a normal stem. Internally, a tuber is filled with starch stored in enlarged parenchyma-like cells. The inside of a tuber has the typical cell structures of any stem, including a pith, vascular zones, and a cortex.

The tuber is produced in one growing season and used to perennate the plant and as a means of propagation. When fall comes, the above-ground structure of the plant dies, but the tubers survive underground over winter until spring, when they regenerate new shoots that use the stored food in the tuber to grow. As the main shoot develops from the tuber, the base of the shoot close to the tuber produces adventitious roots and lateral buds on the shoot. The shoot also produces stolons that are long etiolated stems. The stolon elongates during long days with the presence of high auxins levels that prevent root growth off the stolon. Before new tuber formation begins, the stolon must be a certain age. The enzyme lipoxygenase makes a hormone, jasmonic acid, which is involved in the control of potato tuber development.

The stolons are easily recognized when potato plants are grown from seeds. As the plants grow, stolons are produced around the soil surface from the nodes. The tubers form close to the soil surface and sometimes even on top of the ground. When potatoes are cultivated, the tubers are cut into pieces and planted much deeper into the soil. Planting the pieces deeper creates more area for the plants to generate the tubers and their size increases. The pieces sprout shoots that grow to the surface. These shoots are rhizome-like and generate short stolons from the nodes while in the ground. When the shoots reach the soil surface, they produce roots and shoots that grow into the green plant.

== Root tubers ==
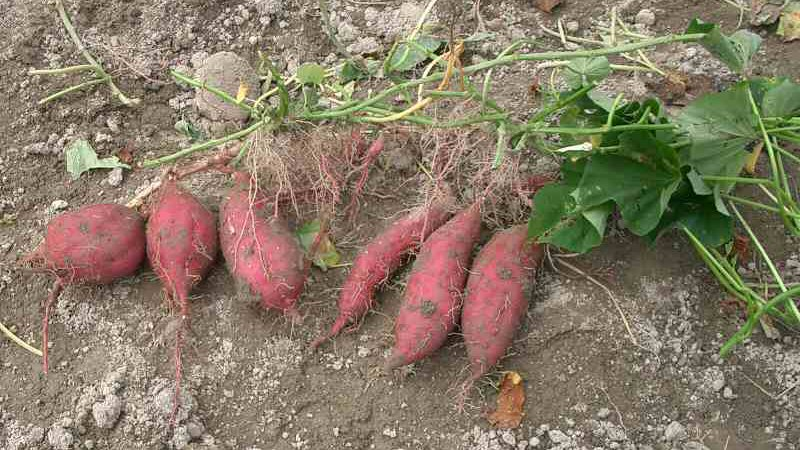
Freshly dug sweet potato plants with tubers

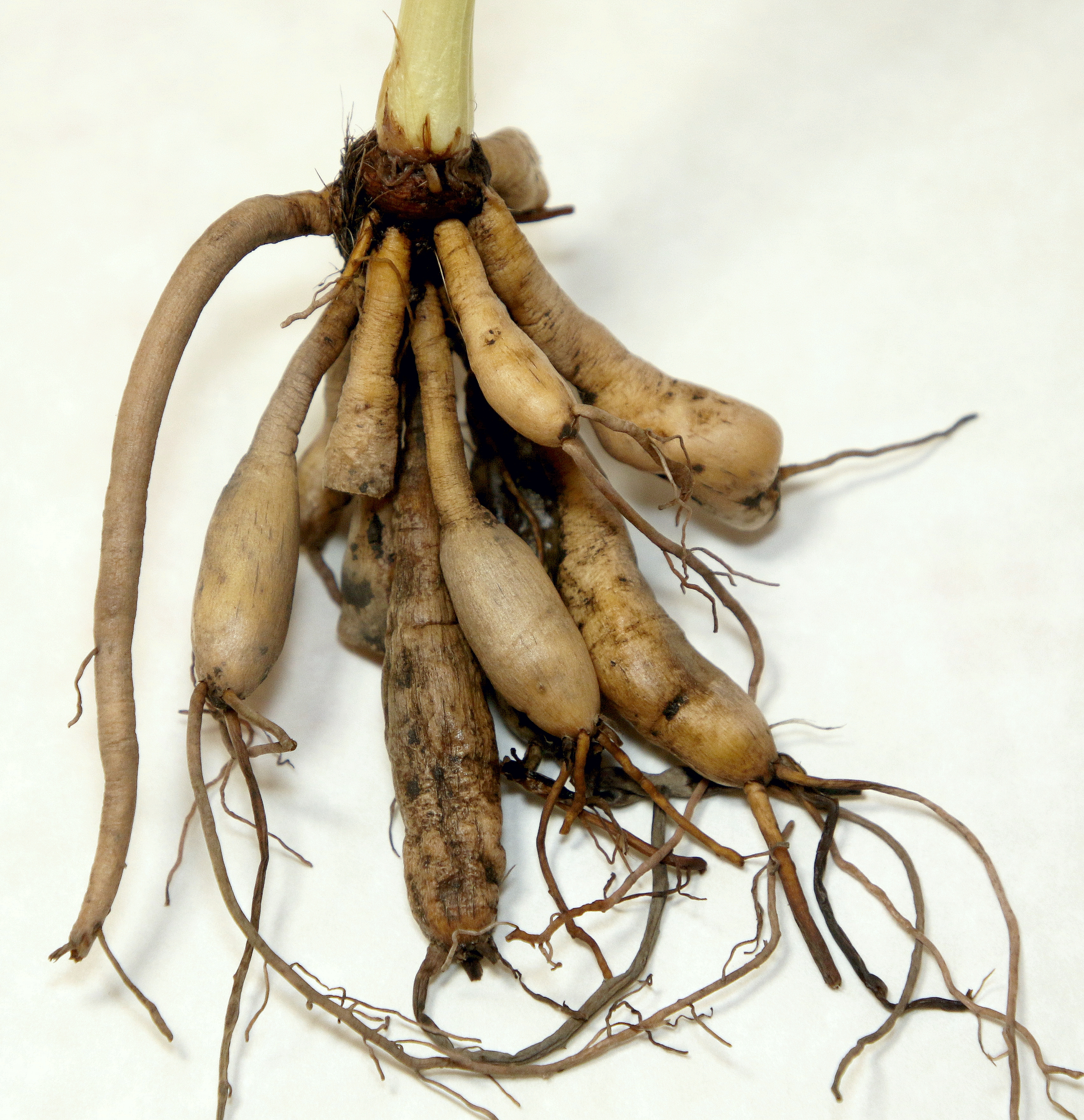
Hemerocallis tuber roots

A root tuber, tuberous root or storage root is a modified lateral root, enlarged to function as a storage organ. The enlarged area of the tuber can be produced at the end or middle of a root or involve the entire root. It is thus different in origin, but similar in function and appearance, to a stem tuber. Plants with tuberous roots include the sweet potato (Ipomoea batatas), cassava, dahlia, and Sagittaria (arrowhead) species.

Root tubers are perennating organs, thickened roots that store nutrients over periods when the plant cannot actively grow, thus permitting survival from one year to the next. The massive enlargement of secondary roots typically represented by sweet potato have the internal and external cell and tissue structures of a normal root; they produce adventitious roots and stems, which again produce adventitious roots.

In root tubers, there are no nodes and internodes or reduced leaves. The proximal end of the tuber, which was attached to the old plant, has crown tissue that produces buds which grow into new stems and foliage. The distal end of the tuber normally produces unmodified roots. In stem tubers the order is reversed, with the distal end producing stems. Tuberous roots are biennial in duration: the plant produces tubers the first year, and at the end of the growing season, the shoots often die, leaving the newly generated tubers; the next growing season, the tubers produce new shoots. As the shoots of the new plant grow, the stored reserves of the tuber are consumed in the production of new roots, stems, and reproductive organs; any remaining root tissue dies concurrently to the plant's regeneration of the next generation of tubers.

Hemerocallis fulva (orange daylily) and a number of daylily hybrids have large root tubers; H. fulva spreads by underground stolons that end with a new fan that grows roots that produce thick tubers and then send out more stolons.

Plants with root tubers can be propagated from late summer to late winter by digging up the tubers and separating them, making sure that each piece has some crown tissue for replanting.

Roots and tubers are some of the most widely harvested crops in the world.

Root tubers are a rich source of nutrients for humans and wild animals, e.g. those of Sagittaria plants which are eaten by ducks.

== See also ==
- Bulb, modified stems with a short fleshy vertical stem, covered by thick fleshy modified leaves that enclose a bud for the next season's growth
- Caudex, a form of stem modification similar in appearance to a tuber
- Corm, modified stems covered by dry scale-like leaves called a tunic, differing from true bulbs by having distinct nodes and internodes
- Taproot, the largest, most central, and most dominant root of some plants
