= Lepisia =

Scientific classification
- Kingdom: Animalia
- Phylum: Arthropoda
- Class: Insecta
- Order: Coleoptera
- Suborder: Polyphaga
- Infraorder: Scarabaeiformia
- Family: Scarabaeidae
- Subfamily: Melolonthinae
- Tribe: Hopliini
- Genus: Lepisia; Le Peletier & Audinet-Serville, 1828

Genus beetles

Lepisia is a genus of beetles belonging to the family Scarabaeidae.

== Species ==
- Lepisia braunsi Schein, 1956
- Lepisia cederbergensis Dombrow, 1999
- Lepisia colvillei Dombrow, 2006
- Lepisia elkiana Dombrow, 1999
- Lepisia gaerdesi Schein, 1956
- Lepisia heidenreichi Dombrow, 2006
- Lepisia ornatissima Burmeister, 1844
- Lepisia rupicola (Fabricius, 1775)
- Lepisia vittata Moser, 1918
