= Lepisia ornatissima =

Scientific classification
- Kingdom: Animalia
- Phylum: Arthropoda
- Class: Insecta
- Order: Coleoptera
- Suborder: Polyphaga
- Infraorder: Scarabaeiformia
- Family: Scarabaeidae
- Genus: Lepisia
- Species: L. ornatissima

Binomial name
- Lepisia ornatissima Burmeister, 1844

Species of beetle

Lepisia ornatissima is a species of beetle of the family Scarabaeidae. It is found in South Africa (Western Cape, Northern Cape).

== Description ==
Adults reach a length of about 9–9.5 mm (0.35–0.37 in). Males have a black head, pronotum and legs. The pronotum has three bands of greenish-yellow scales separated by two bands of purplish-brown ones, and the elytra are purple-brown, have a bordering of yellowish-green, and are partly covered with scales of nearly the same colour as the background but with a tinge of orange. The pygidial and abdominal parts have light golden scales. Females have the same shape and size as males, but the whole upper surface and that of the pygidial part are clothed with greenish-yellow scales, the pronotum has three bands of brighter yellow ones similar in tint to those clothing the scutellum, and the elytra, in addition to the villose hairs along the suture similar to those of the males, have each eight rows of long setae.
