= Lepisia rupicola =

Scientific classification
- Kingdom: Animalia
- Phylum: Arthropoda
- Class: Insecta
- Order: Coleoptera
- Suborder: Polyphaga
- Infraorder: Scarabaeiformia
- Family: Scarabaeidae
- Genus: Lepisia
- Species: L. rupicola

Binomial name
- Lepisia rupicola (Fabricius, 1775)

Synonyms
- Melolontha rupicola Fabricius, 1775; Melolontha ferrugata Gyllenhal, 1817

Species of beetle

Lepisia rupicola is a species of beetle of the family Scarabaeidae. It is found in South Africa (Western Cape, Northern Cape).

== Description ==
Adults reach a length of about 7–8 mm (0.28–0.31 in). Males are covered on the upper side and the pygidial part with green scales and on the abdomen with greenish-yellow ones. The head is roughly scabrose and clothed with a flavescent long pubescence. The pronotum isa clothed in addition to the contiguous scales with long, villose, flavescent or yellow hairs. The scales on the scutellum are of the same colour as those covering the pronotum and the elytra. The latter are parallel, numerously costulate, but only two of the costules are plain, and all the costules bear a row of short, whitish setae, along the suture and the outer margin these setae are much longer and stiffer. The legs are black and very bristly. Females are exactly like the males, but the scales on the pygidium and the abdomen have a somewhat whiter tinge.
