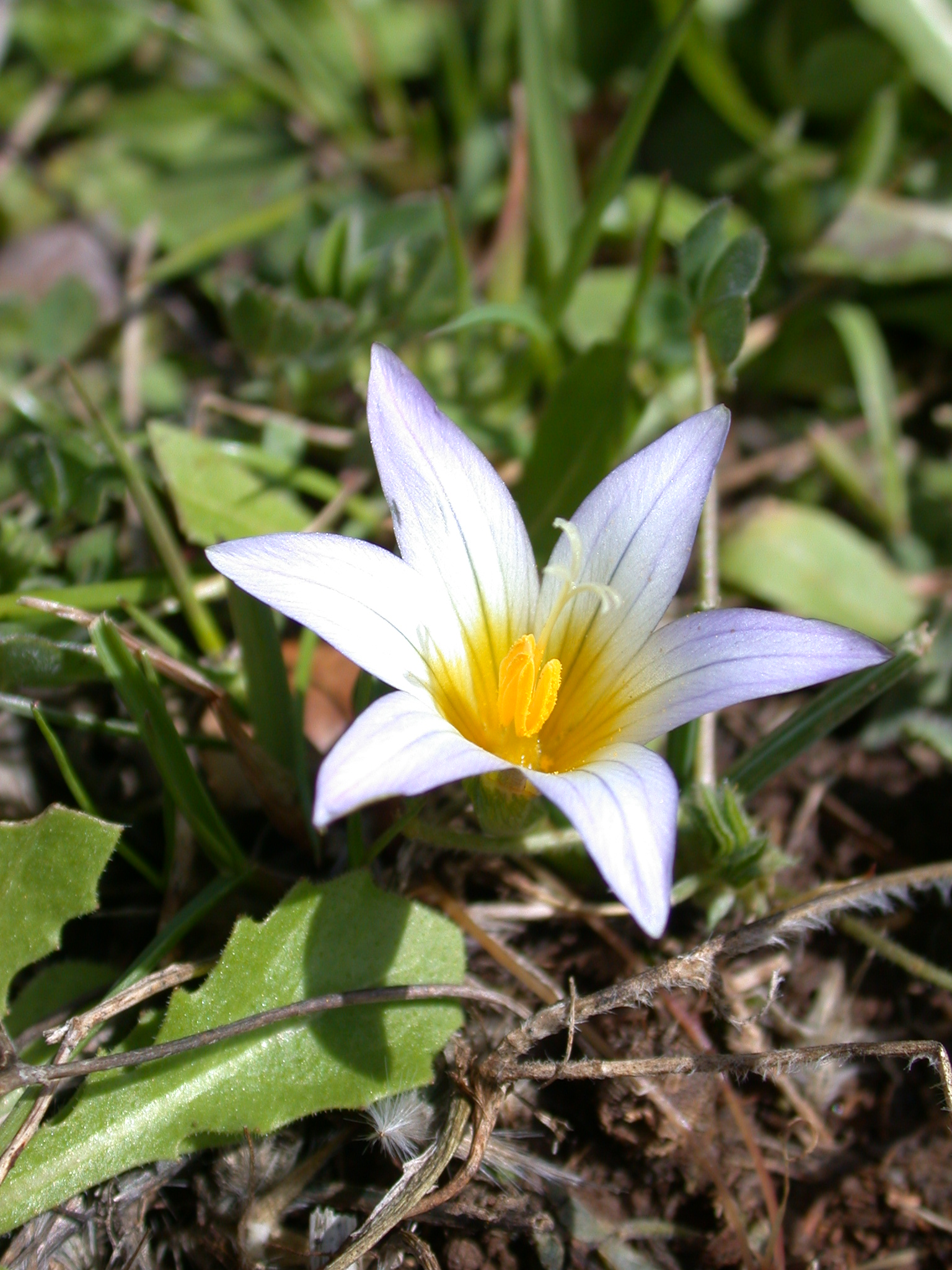
- Romulea bulbocodium

Scientific classification
- Kingdom: Plantae
- Clade: Tracheophytes
- Clade: Angiosperms
- Clade: Monocots
- Order: Asparagales
- Family: Iridaceae
- Subfamily: Crocoideae
- Tribe: Croceae
- Genus: Romulea; Maratti

Type species
- Romulea bulbocodium (L.) Sebastiani & Mauri

Synonyms
- Bulbocodium Gronov. 1755 not L. 1753 nor Ludw. ex Kuntze 1891; Bulbocodium Ludw. ex Kuntze 1891 not L. 1753 nor Gronov. 1755; Ilmu Adans.; Spatalanthus Sweet; Trichonema Ker Gawl.

= Romulea =

Genus of flowering plants

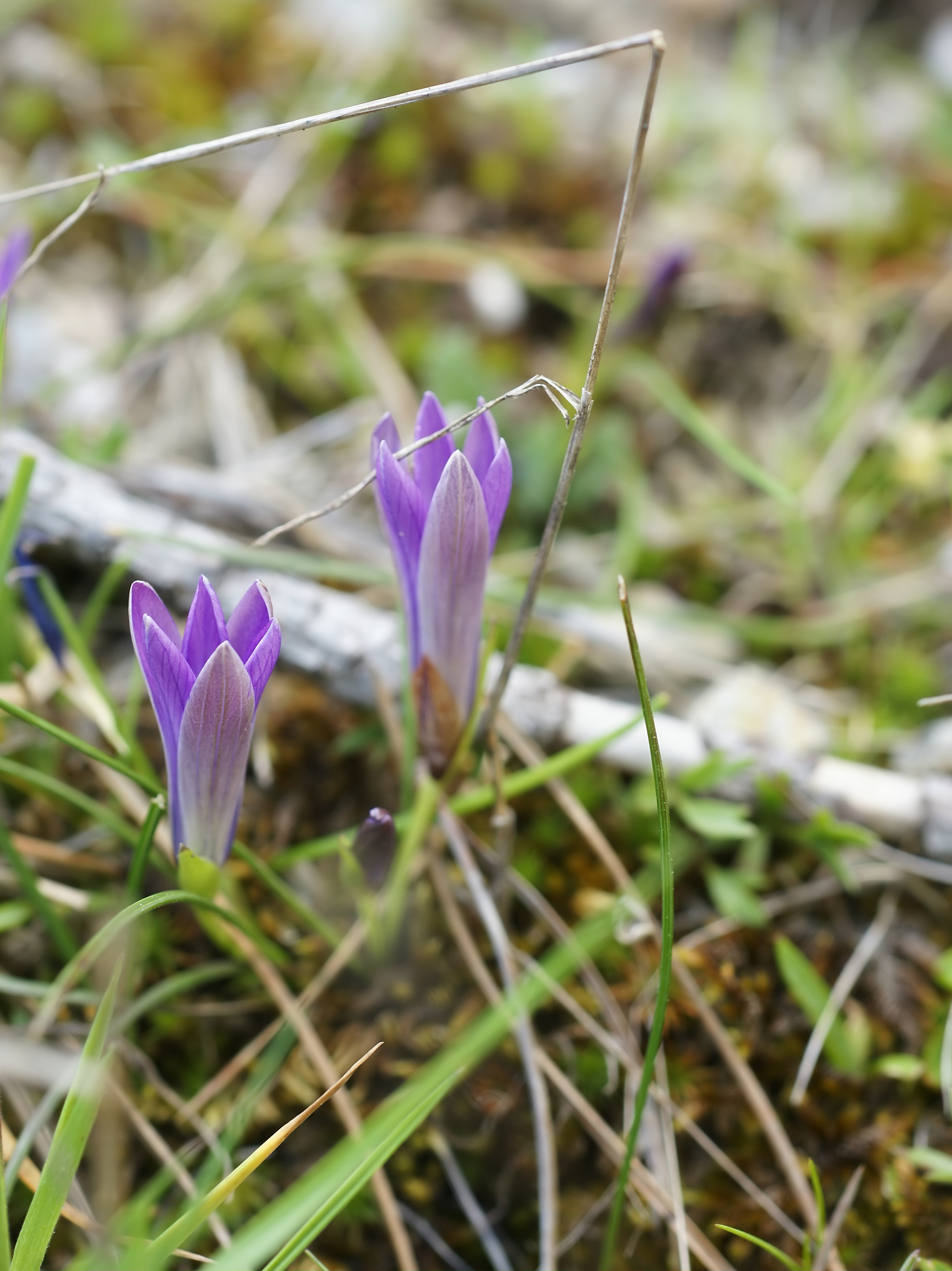
Romulea requienii

Romulea is a genus of flowering plants in the family Iridaceae, first described as a genus in 1772. It is found in Europe, the Mediterranean, the Arabian Peninsula, and Africa.

== Description ==
=== Vegetative characteristics ===
Species of Romulea are perennial cormous herbs.

=== Generative characteristics ===
The capsule fruits bear many brown, globose seeds.

== Etymology ==
The genus name refers to the legendary founder of Rome, Romulus, and alludes to the abundance of one of the species in the Roman countryside.

== Taxonomy ==
=== Publication ===
Romulea Maratti was published by Giovanni Francesco Maratti (1704-1777) in 1772. It is a conserved name.

=== Accepted species ===
Species

- Romulea albiflora J.C.Manning & Goldblatt - Cape Province of South Africa
- Romulea albomarginata M.P.de Vos - Ceres Koue Bokkeveld in Cape Province of South Africa
- Romulea antiatlantica Maire - Morocco
- Romulea aquatica G.J.Lewis - Cape Province of South Africa
- Romulea arnaudii Moret - southeastern France
- Romulea atranda G.J.Lewis - Cape Province of South Africa
- Romulea austinii E.Phillips - Cape Province of South Africa
- Romulea autumnalis L.Bolus - Cape Province of South Africa
- Romulea barkerae M.P.de Vos - Cape Province of South Africa
- Romulea biflora (Bég.) M.P.de Vos - Cape Province of South Africa
- Romulea bifrons Pau - Morocco
- Romulea bocchierii Frignani & Iiriti - Sardinia
- Romulea bulbocodium (L.) Sebast. & Mauri - Mediterranean region from Morocco + Portugal to Syria, Sudan
- Romulea camerooniana Baker - central + southern Africa north to Cameroon + Ethiopia
- Romulea cedarbergensis M.P.de Vos - Cedarberg in Cape Province of South Africa
- Romulea citrina Baker - Cape Province of South Africa
- Romulea clusiana (Lange) Nyman - Morocco, Algeria, Spain, Portugal
- Romulea collina J.C.Manning & Goldblatt - Hantamsberg in Cape Province of South Africa
- Romulea columnae Sebast. & Mauri - Mediterranean region from Morocco + Portugal to Syria, Great Britain, Canary Islands, Madeira, Azores
- Romulea congoensis Bég. - Rwanda, Ethiopia, Kenya, Tanzania, Uganda
- Romulea corsica Jord. & Fourr. - Corsica
- Romulea cruciata (Jacq.) Bég. - Cape Province of South Africa
- Romulea cyrenaica Bég. - Libya
- Romulea dichotoma (Thunb.) Baker - Cape Province of South Africa
- Romulea discifera J.C.Manning & Goldblatt - Cape Province of South Africa
- Romulea diversiformis M.P.de Vos - Sutherland in Cape Province of South Africa
- Romulea eburea J.C.Manning & Goldblatt - Roggeveld Escarpment in Cape Province of South Africa
- Romulea eburnea J.C.Manning & Goldblatt - Cape Province of South Africa
- Romulea elliptica M.P.de Vos - Cape Province of South Africa
- Romulea englerii Bég. - Morocco
- Romulea eximia M.P.de Vos - Cape Province of South Africa
- Romulea fibrosa M.P.de Vos - Cape Province of South Africa
- Romulea fischeri Pax - Kenya, Uganda, Ethiopia, Somalia, Eritrea, Socotra, Yemen, Saudi Arabia
- Romulea flava (Lam.) M.P.de Vos - Cape Province of South Africa; naturalized in Australia
- Romulea flexuosa Klatt - Cape Province of South Africa
- Romulea florentii Moret - southeastern France
- Romulea gigantea Bég. - Cape Province of South Africa
- Romulea gracillima Baker - Cape Province of South Africa
- Romulea hallii M.P.de Vos - Roggeveld Escarpment in Cape Province of South Africa
- Romulea hantamensis (Diels) Goldblatt - Hantamsberg in Cape Province of South Africa
- Romulea hirsuta (Steud. ex Klatt) Baker - Cape Province of South Africa
- Romulea hirta Schltr. - Cape Province of South Africa
- Romulea jugicola M.P.de Vos - Cape Province of South Africa
- Romulea kamisensis M.P.de Vos - Cape Province of South Africa
- Romulea komsbergensis M.P.de Vos - Roggeveld Escarpment in Cape Province of South Africa
- Romulea leipoldtii Marais - Cape Province of South Africa
- Romulea ligustica Parl. - Corsica, Sardinia, Veneto, Liguria, Algeria, Libya, Morocco, Tunisia
- Romulea lilacina J.C.Manning & Goldblatt - Cape Province of South Africa
- Romulea × limbarae Bég. - Sardinia (R. ligustica × R. requienii)
- Romulea linaresii Parl. - Sicily, Greece, Turkey, Tunisia
- Romulea longipes Schltr. - Cape Province of South Africa
- Romulea lutea J.C.Manning & Goldblatt - Cape Province of South Africa
- Romulea luteiflora (M.P.de Vos) M.P.de Vos - Cape Province, Lesotho
- Romulea macowanii Baker - Cape Province, Free State, Lesotho
- Romulea maculata J.C.Manning & Goldblatt - Cape Province of South Africa
- Romulea malaniae M.P.de Vos - Cape Province of South Africa
- Romulea maroccana Bég. - Morocco
- Romulea melitensis Bég. - Malta, Gozo
- Romulea membranacea M.P.de Vos - near Middelpos in Cape Province of South Africa
- Romulea minutiflora Klatt - Cape Province; naturalized in Australia
- Romulea monadelpha (Sweet ex Steud.) Baker - Cape Province of South Africa
- Romulea montana Schltr. ex Bég. - Cape Province of South Africa
- Romulea monticola M.P.de Vos - Cape Province of South Africa
- Romulea multifida M.P.de Vos - Roggeveld Escarpment in Cape Province of South Africa
- Romulea multisulcata M.P.de Vos - Cape Province of South Africa
- Romulea namaquensis M.P.de Vos - Cape Province of South Africa
- Romulea nivalis (Boiss. & Kotschy) Klatt - Mount Hermon in Syria + Lebanon
- Romulea numidica Jord. & Fourr. - Morocco, Algeria
- Romulea obscura Klatt - Cape Province; naturalized in Australia
- †Romulea papyracea Wolley-Dod - Cape Province but extinct
- Romulea pearsonii M.P.de Vos - Cape Province of South Africa
- Romulea penzigii Bég. - Algeria
- Romulea petraea Al-Eisawi - Jordan
- Romulea phoenicia Mouterde - Lebanon, Syria, Jordan
- Romulea pilosa Goldblatt & J.C.Manning - Cape Province of South Africa
- Romulea pratensis M.P.de Vos - Cape Province of South Africa
- Romulea pudica (Sol. ex Ker Gawl.) Baker - Bokkeveld in Cape Province of South Africa
- Romulea quartzicola Goldblatt & J.C.Manning - Cape Province of South Africa
- Romulea ramiflora Ten. - Mediterranean from Morocco + Portugal to Turkey
- Romulea requienii Parl. - Corsica, Sardinia
- Romulea revelieri Jord. & Fourr. - Corsica, several small Italian islands in the Tyrrhenian Sea
- Romulea rosea (L.) Eckl. - Cape Province; naturalized in France, Chile, Australia, California, St. Helena, Tristan da Cunha
- Romulea rupestris J.C.Manning & Goldblatt - Cape Province of South Africa
- Romulea sabulosa Schltr. ex Bég. - Cape Province of South Africa
- Romulea saldanhensis M.P.de Vos - Cape Province of South Africa
- Romulea sanguinalis M.P.de Vos - Bokkeveld in Cape Province of South Africa
- Romulea saxatilis M.P.de Vos - Cape Province of South Africa
- Romulea schlechteri Bég. - Cape Province of South Africa
- Romulea setifolia N.E.Br. - Cape Province of South Africa
- Romulea singularis J.C.Manning & Goldblatt - Cape Province of South Africa
- Romulea sinispinosensis M.P.de Vos - Doringbaai in Cape Province of South Africa
- Romulea sladenii M.P.de Vos - Gifberg Plateau in Cape Province of South Africa
- Romulea speciosa (Ker Gawl.) Baker - Cape Province of South Africa
- Romulea sphaerocarpa M.P.de Vos - Great Karoo in Cape Province of South Africa
- Romulea stellata M.P.de Vos - Cape Province of South Africa
- Romulea sulphurea Bég - Pakhuis Mountains, Western Cape province of South Africa
- Romulea subfistulosa M.P.de Vos - Cape Province of South Africa
- Romulea syringodeoflora M.P.de Vos - Cape Province of South Africa
- Romulea tabularis Eckl. ex Bég. - Cape Province of South Africa
- Romulea tempskyana Freyn - Cyprus, Turkey, Greek Islands, Israel, Palestine
- Romulea tetragona M.P.de Vos - Cape Province of South Africa
- Romulea tortilis Baker - Cape Province of South Africa
- Romulea tortuosa (Licht. ex Roem. & Schult.) Baker - Cape Province of South Africa
- Romulea toximontana M.P.de Vos - Cape Province of South Africa
- Romulea triflora (Burm.f.) N.E.Br. - Cape Province of South Africa
- Romulea tubulosa J.C.Manning & Goldblatt - Cape Province of South Africa
- Romulea unifolia M.P.de Vos - Cape Province of South Africa
- Romulea vaillantii Quézel - Algeria
- Romulea villaretii Dobignard - Morocco
- Romulea vinacea M.P.de Vos - Pakhuis Pass in Cape Province of South Africa
- Romulea viridibracteata M.P.de Vos - Cape Province of South Africa
- Romulea vlokii M.P.de Vos - Cape Province of South Africa

== Bibliography ==
- Maratti, Giovanni Francesco [in Spanish] (1772). Plantarum Romuleae, et Saturniae in agro Romano existentium: specificas notas describit inventor (in Latin). Rome: Typis Archangeli Casaletti.
