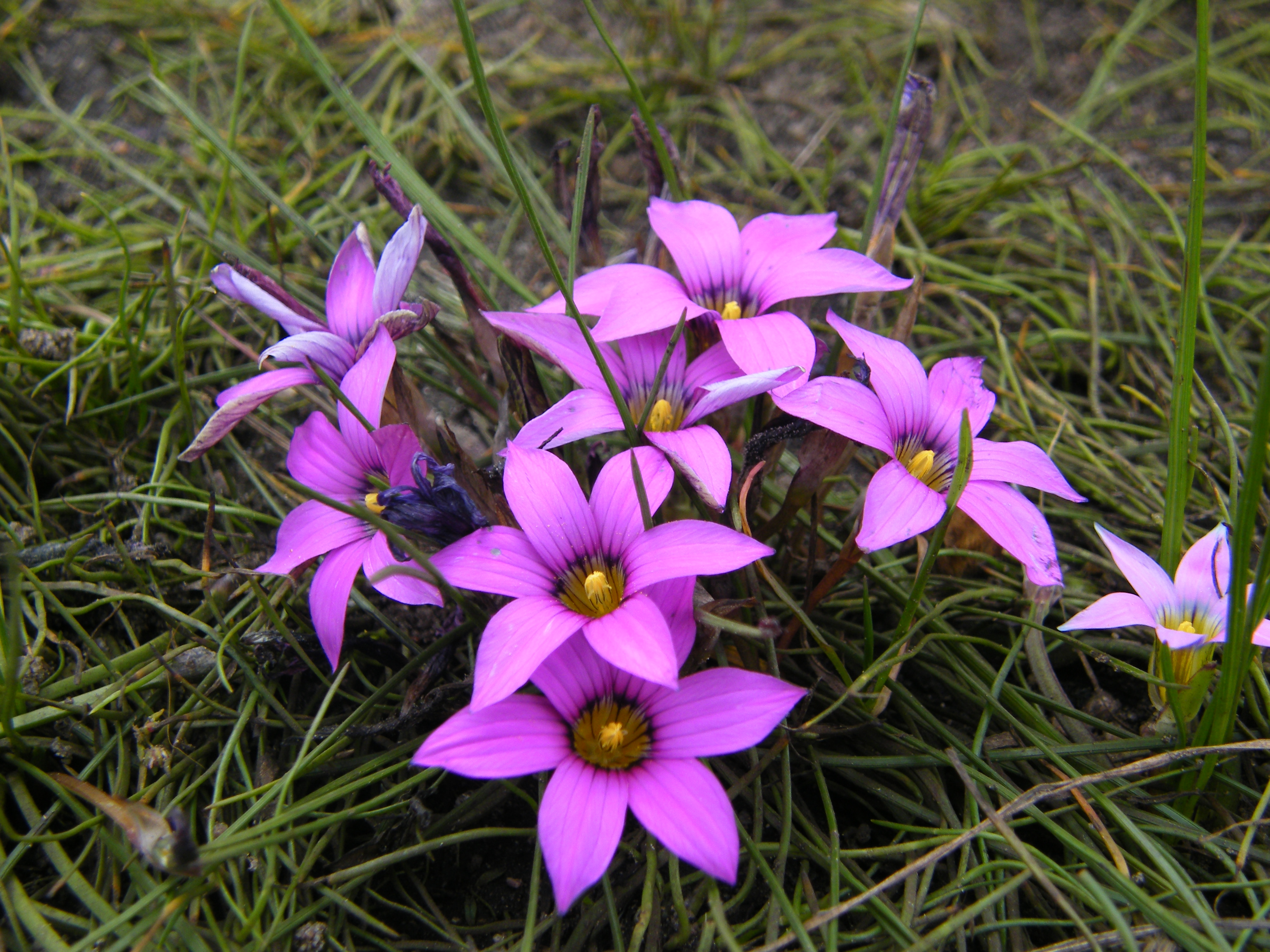

Scientific classification
- Kingdom: Plantae
- Clade: Tracheophytes
- Clade: Angiosperms
- Clade: Monocots
- Order: Asparagales
- Family: Iridaceae
- Genus: Romulea
- Species: R. rosea

Binomial name
- Romulea rosea (L.) Eckl.

Synonyms
- Ixia rosea L. Romulea longifolia (Salisb.) Baker; Romulea bulbodocium L. Romulea cruciata Ker-Gawl. Trichonema roseum Ker.

= Romulea rosea =

Species of flowering plant

Romulea rosea is a herbaceous perennial plant in the family Iridaceae. It is a small plant, usually less than 20 cm high, with grass-like leaves. The flowers, which appear in spring, are pink with a yellow throat. Common names include Guildford grass, onion grass and rosy sandcrocus.

R. rosea is endemic to the western Cape Province (now Western Cape, Eastern Cape and Northern Cape) in South Africa, but it has become naturalised in Europe, Australia, New Zealand, and California in the United States. It is considered to be an environmental weed in much of Australia.
