= Corm =

Underground plant stem

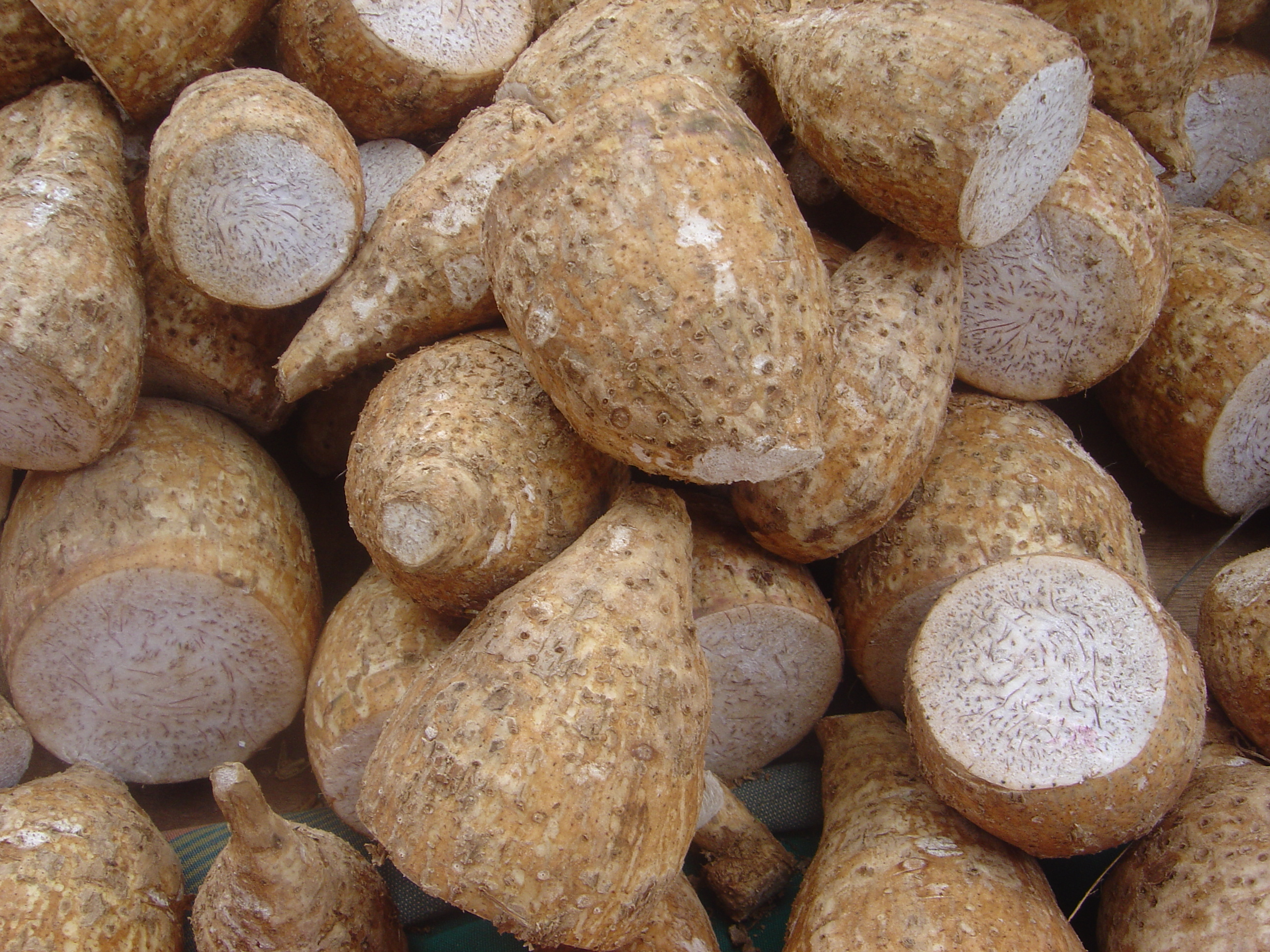
Taro corms for sale in a Réunion market

Corm or bulbo-tuber (also spelled bulbotuber) is a short, vertical, swollen, underground plant stem that serves as a storage organ that some plants use to survive winter or other adverse conditions such as summer drought and heat (perennation).

The word cormous usually means plants that grow from corms, parallel to the terms tuberous and bulbous to describe plants growing from tubers and bulbs.

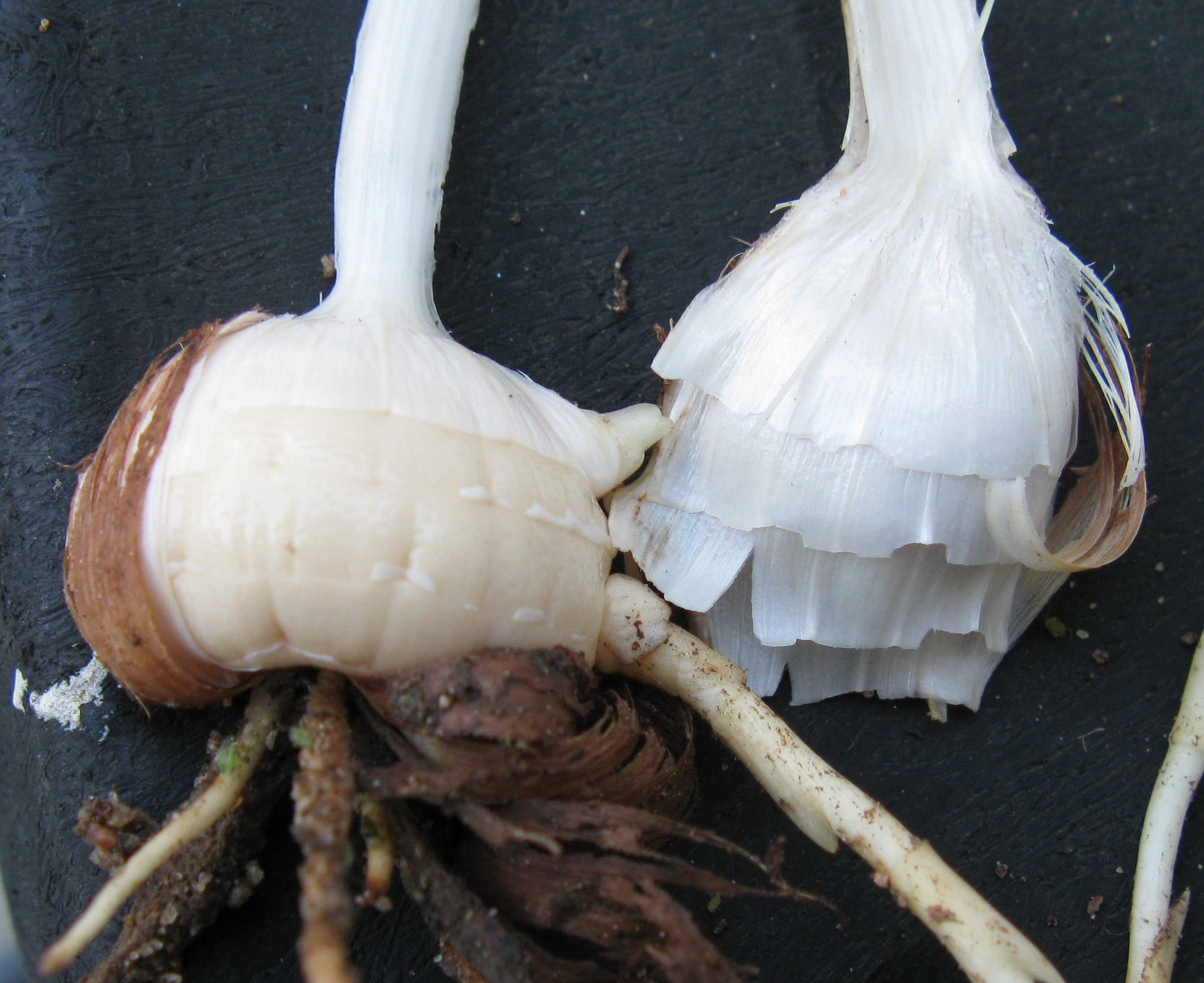
Crocosmia corm with the tunic partly stripped to show its origin at the nodes on the corm cortex.

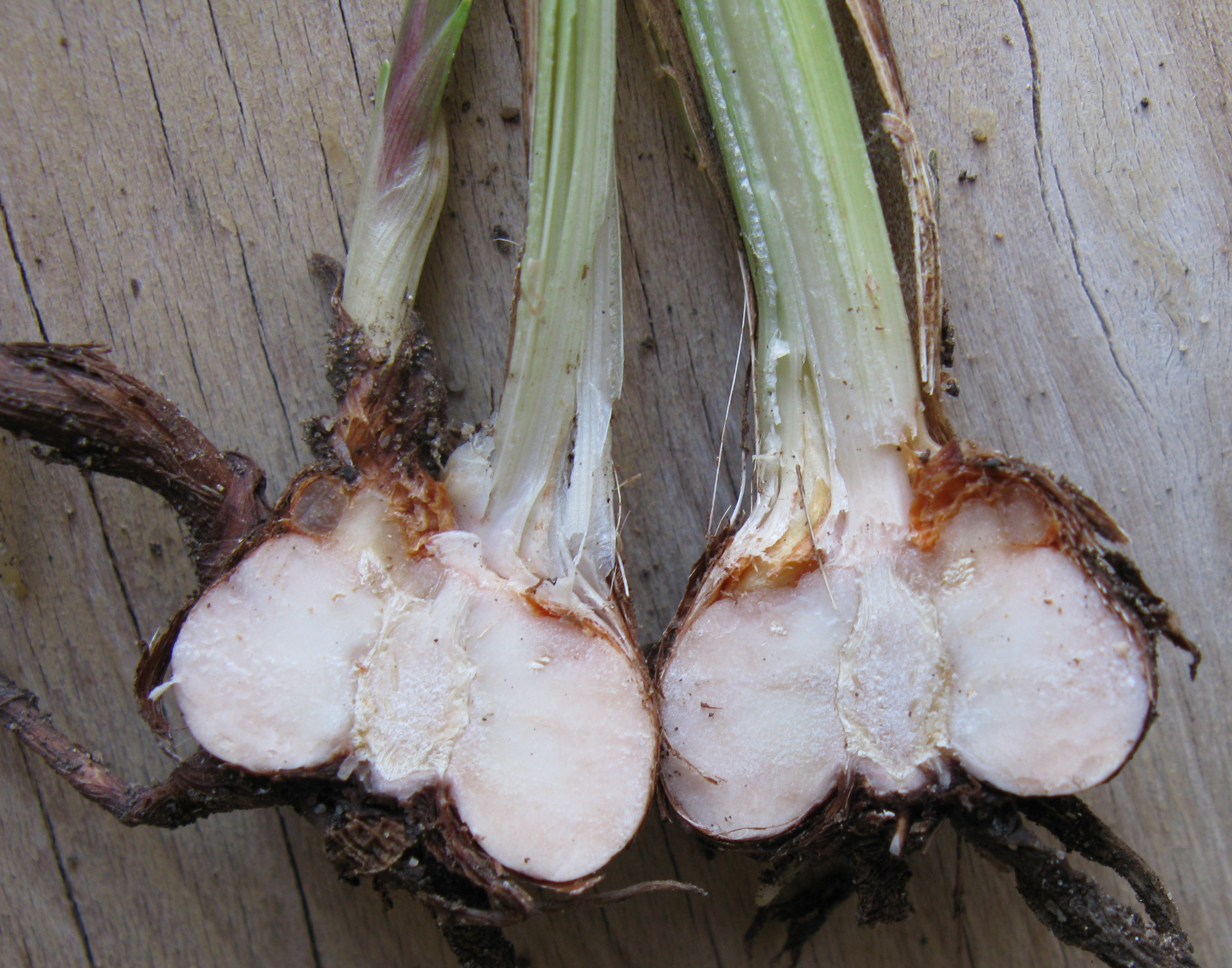
Crocosmia corm anatomy, showing tunic, cortex of storage tissue, central medulla, and emergence of a new corm from a bud near the top.

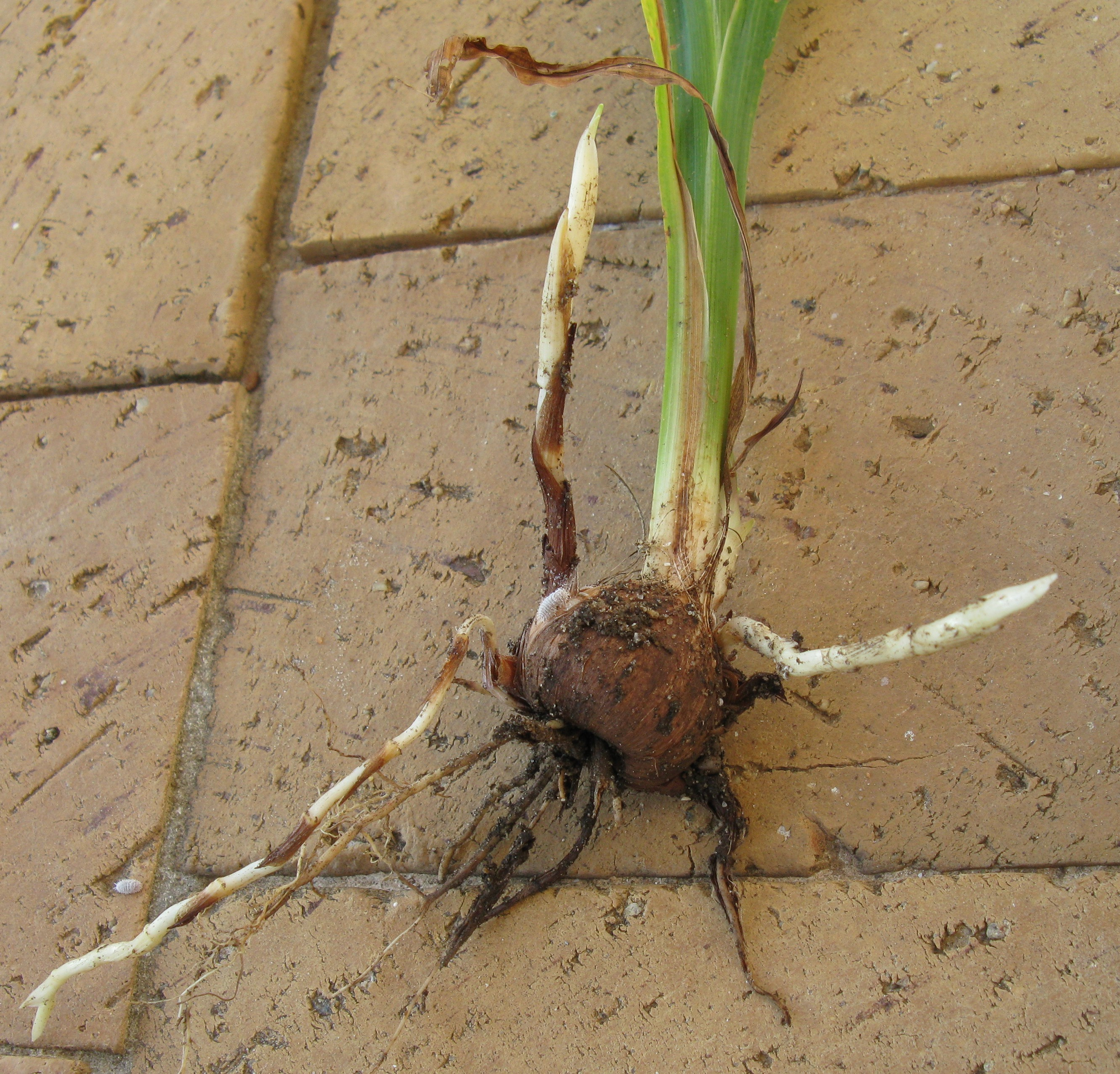
Crocosmia corm with stolons emerging through the tunic. The stolons originate at the axillary buds of the corm scales, and generally produce new corms at their tips

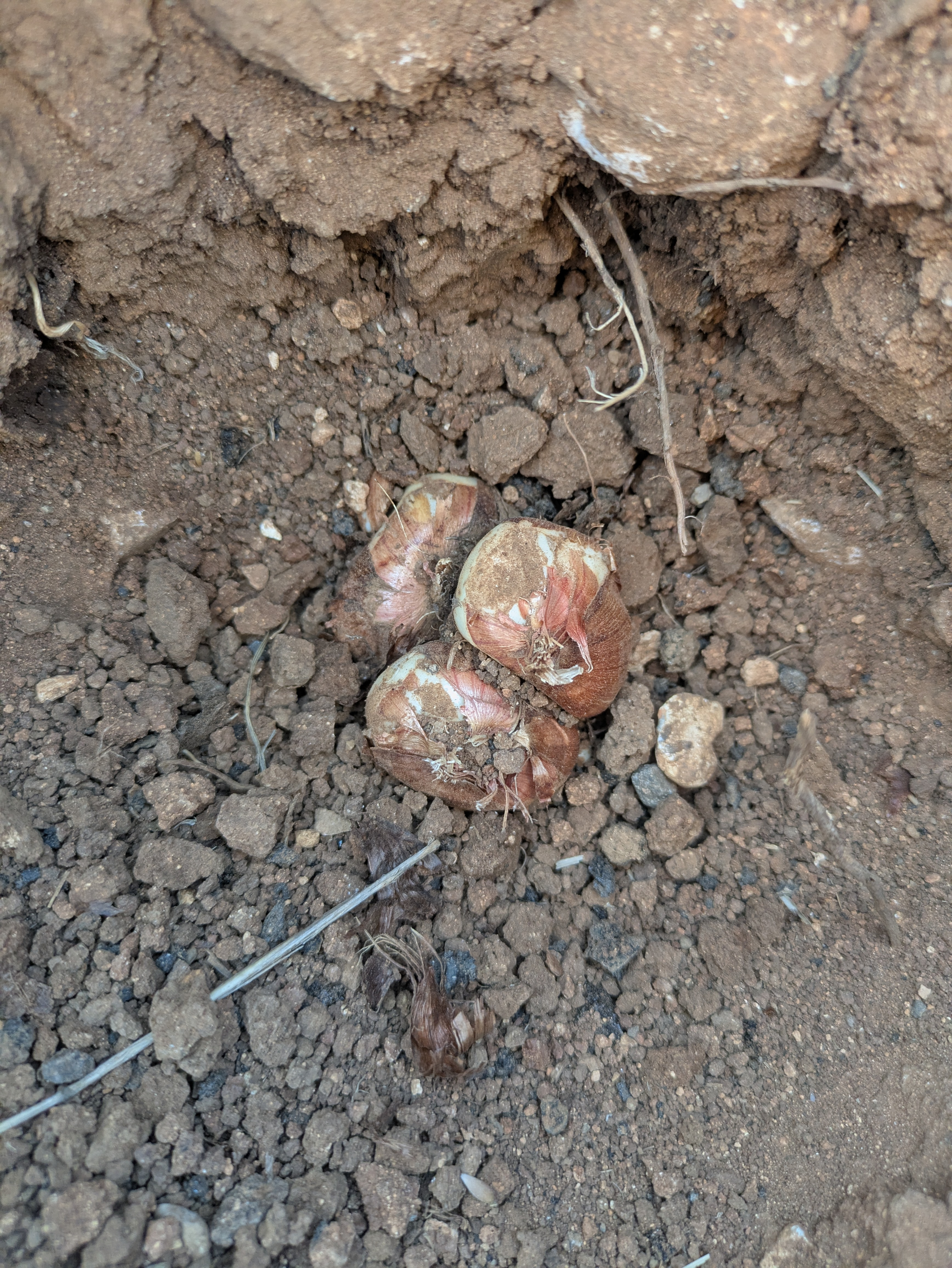
Corms of Gladiolus italicus, Behbahan

A corm consists of one or more internodes with at least one growing point, generally with protective leaves modified into skins or tunics. The tunic of a corm forms from dead petiole sheaths—remnants of leaves produced in previous years. They act as a covering, protecting the corm from insects, digging animals, flooding, and water loss. The tunics of some species are thin, dry, and papery, at least in young plants, however, in some families, such as Iridaceae, the tunic of a mature corm can be formidable protection. For example, some of the larger species of Watsonia accumulate thick, rot-resistant tunics over a period of years, producing a structure of tough, reticulated fibre. Other species, such as many in the genus Lapeirousia, have tunics of hard, woody layers.

Internally, a typical corm mostly consists of parenchyma cells, rich in starch, above a circular basal node from which roots grow.

Long-lived cormous plants vary in their long-term development. Some regularly replace their older corms with a stack of younger corms, increased more or less seasonally. By splitting such a stack before the older corm generations wither too badly, the horticulturist can exploit the individual corms for propagation. Other species seldom do anything of that kind; their corms simply grow larger in most seasons. Yet others split when multiple buds or stolons on a large corm sprout independently, forming a tussock.

Corms can be dug up and used to propagate or redistribute the plant (see, for example, taro). Plants with corms generally can be propagated by cutting the corms into sections and replanting. Suitably treated, each section with at least one bud usually can generate a new corm.

== Comparison to bulbs ==
Corms are sometimes confused with true bulbs; they are often similar in appearance to bulbs externally, and thus erroneously called bulbs. Corms are stems that are internally structured with solid tissues, which distinguishes them from bulbs, which are mostly made up of layered fleshy scales that are modified leaves. As a result, a corm cut in half appears solid inside, but a true bulb cut in half reveals that it is made up of layers. Corms are structurally plant stems, with nodes and internodes with buds and produce adventitious roots. On the top of the corm, one or a few buds grow into shoots that produce normal leaves and flowers.

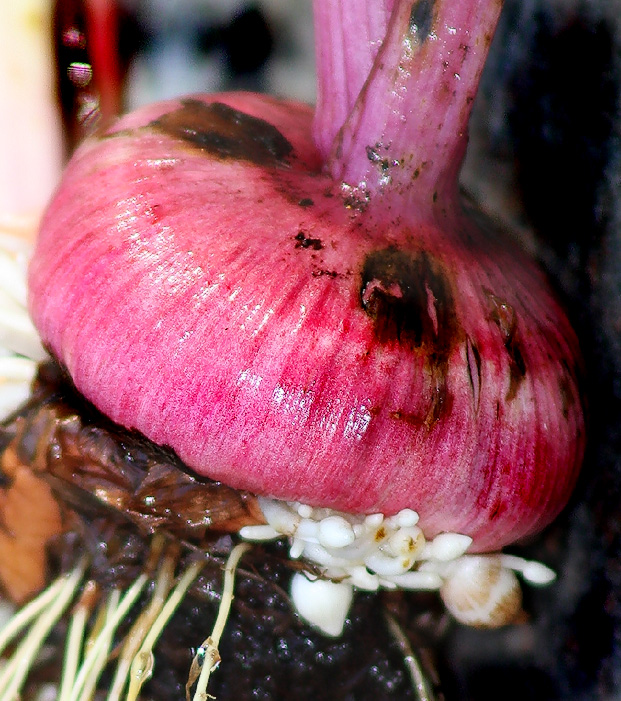
Gladiolus corm, showing the formation of small cormels at the ends of short stolons

== Cormels ==
Corms can form many small cormlets called cormels, from the basal areas of the new growing corms, especially when the main growing point is damaged. These propagate corm-forming plants. A number of species replace corms every year by growing a new corm. This process starts after the shoot develops fully expanded leaves. The new corm forms at the shoot base just above the old corm. As the new corm grows, short stolons appear that end with the newly growing small cormels. As the plants grow and flower, they use up the old corm, which shrivels away. The new corm that replaces the old corm grows in size, especially after flowering ends.

The old corm produces the greatest number of cormels when close to the soil surface. Small cormels normally take one or two more years of growth before they are large enough to flower.

Cormels do have a reproductive function, but in the wild they also are important as a survival strategy. In most places where geophytes are common, so are animals that feed on them, whether from above like pigs, or from below like bulb weevils, mole rats, or pocket gophers. Such animals eat through protective tunics, but they generally miss several cormels that remain in the soil to replace the consumed plant. Plants such as Homeria, Watsonia and Gladiolus, genera that are vulnerable to such animals, are probably the ones that produce cormels in the greatest numbers and most widely distributed over the plant. Homeria species produce bunches of cormels on underground stem nodes, and Watsonia meriana for example actually produces cormels profusely from under bracts on the inflorescences.

Those growing from the bottom of the corm are normal fibrous roots formed as the shoots grow, and are produced from the basal area at the bottom of the corm. The second type are thicker layered roots called contractile roots that form as the new corms are growing. They pull the corm deeper into the soil. In some species contractile roots are produced in response to fluctuating soil temperatures and light levels. In such species, once the corm is deep enough within the soil where the temperature is more uniform and there is no light, the contractile roots no longer grow and the corm is no longer pulled deeper into the soil. In some other species, contractile roots seem to be a defence against digging animals and can bury the corm surprisingly deeply over the years. Wurmbea marginata is one example of a small plant that can be challenging to dig unharmed out of a hard, clayey, hillside.

== Cormous plants ==
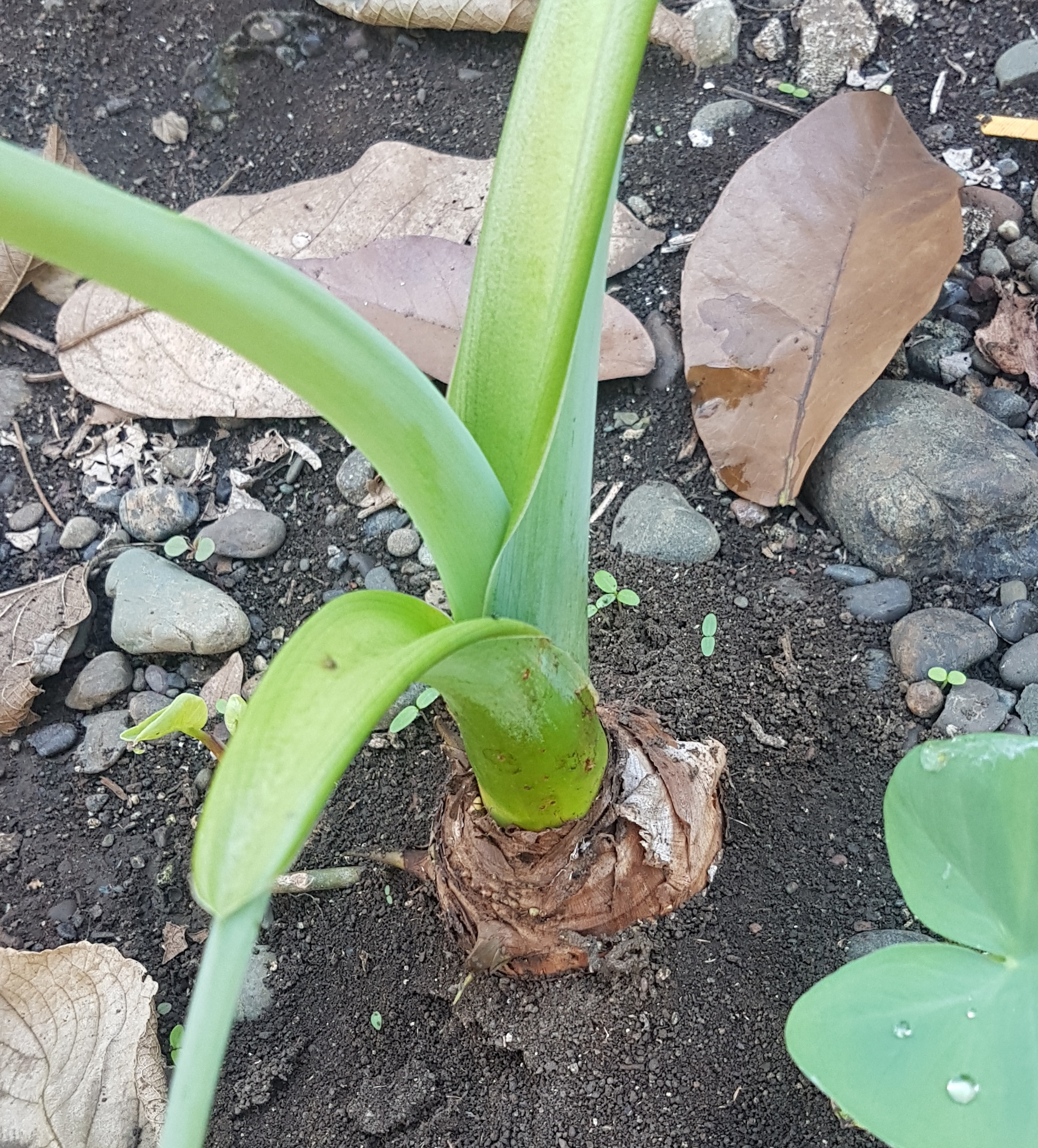
Corm on Alocasia macrorrhizos

Cultivated plants that form corms include:

- Alismataceae
  - Sagittaria spp. (arrowhead or wapatoo)
- Araceae
  - Alocasia macrorrhizos (giant taro)
  - Amorphophallus
  - Arisaema
  - Colocasia esculenta (taro)
  - Cyrtosperma merkusii (giant swamp taro)
  - Xanthosoma spp. (malanga, cocoyam, tannia, and other names)
- Asparagaceae
  - Bessera
  - Brodiaea
  - Dichelostemma
  - Milla
  - Tecophilaea
- Asteraceae
  - Liatris
- Colchicaceae
  - Colchicum
- Cyperaceae
  - Cyperus esculentus (yellow nutsedge)
  - Eleocharis dulcis (Chinese water chestnut)
- Iridaceae
  - Crocosmia (Montbretia)
  - Crocuses, including the saffron crocus (Crocus spp.)
  - Dierama
  - Freesia
  - Gladiolus
  - Some species of irises (Iris spp.)
  - Romulea
- Liliaceae
  - Erythronium americanum (yellow trout lily)
- Musaceae
  - Bananas (Musa spp.)
  - Ensete spp. (enset)

== See also ==
- Rhizome
- Root vegetable
- Tuber
