= Perennation =

Survival of organisms under unfavourable conditions

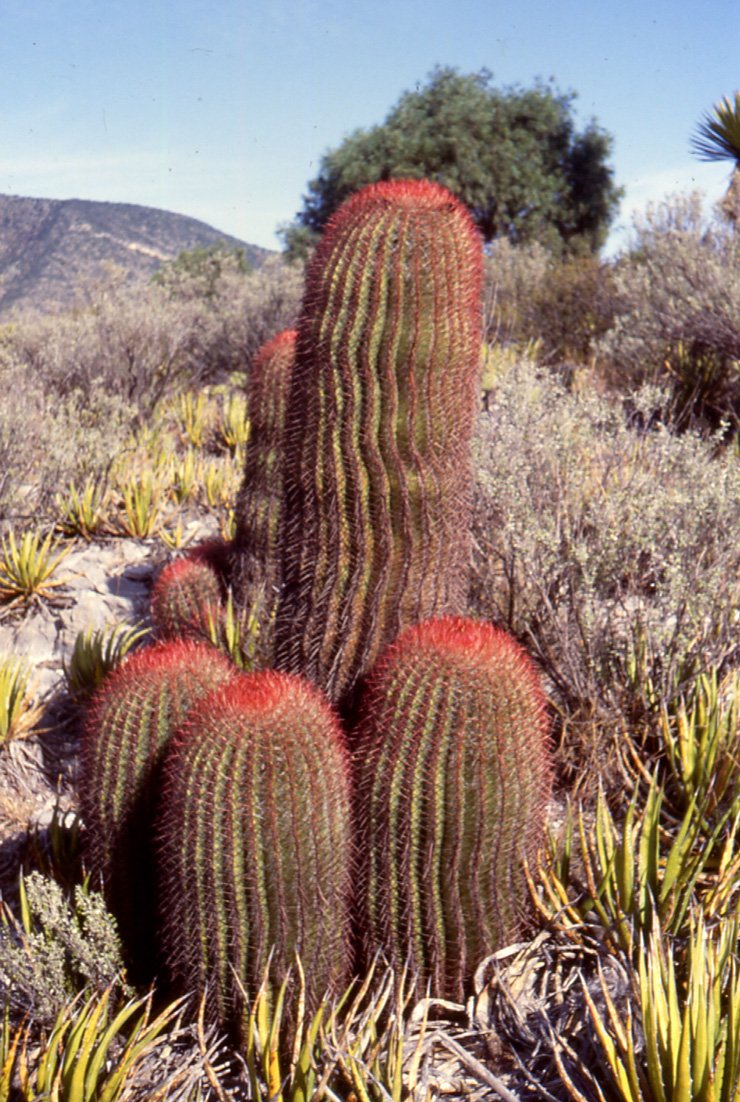

In botany, perennation is the ability of organisms, particularly plants, to survive from one germinating season to another, especially under unfavourable conditions such as drought or winter cold. It typically involves development of a perennating organ, which stores enough nutrients to sustain the organism during the unfavourable season, and develops into one or more new plants the following year. Perennation is done by stems in plants to tide over unfavourable conditions. Common forms of perennating organs are storage organs (e.g. bulbs, tubers, rhizomes and corm), buds and oxalis . Perennation is closely related to vegetative reproduction, as the organisms commonly use the same organs for both survival and reproduction.

== See also ==
- Overwintering
- Plant pathology
- Sclerotium
- Turion (botany)
