= Storage organ =

Part of a plant specifically modified for storage of energy or water

A storage organ is a part of a plant specifically modified for storage of energy (generally in the form of carbohydrates) or water. Storage organs often grow underground, where they are better protected from attack by herbivores. Plants that have an underground storage organ are called geophytes in the Raunkiær plant life-form classification system. Storage organs often, but not always, act as perennating organs which enable plants to survive adverse conditions (such as cold, excessive heat, lack of light or drought).

== Relationship to perennating organ ==
Storage organs may act as perennating organs ('perennating' as in perennial, meaning "through the year", used in the sense of continuing beyond the year and in due course lasting for multiple years). These are used by plants to survive adverse periods in the plant's life-cycle (e.g. caused by cold, excessive heat, lack of light or drought). During these periods, parts of the plant die and then when conditions become favourable again, re-growth occurs from buds in the perennating organs. For example, geophytes growing in woodland under deciduous trees (e.g. bluebells, trilliums) die back to underground storage organs during summer when tree leaf cover restricts light and water is less available.

However, perennating organs need not be storage organs. After losing their leaves, deciduous trees grow them again from 'resting buds', which are the perennating organs of phanerophytes in the Raunkiær classification, but which do not specifically act as storage organs. Equally, storage organs need not be perennating organs. Many succulents have leaves adapted for water storage, which they retain in adverse conditions.

== Underground storage organ ==
In common parlance, underground storage organs may be generically called roots, tubers, or bulbs, but to the botanist there is more specific technical nomenclature:

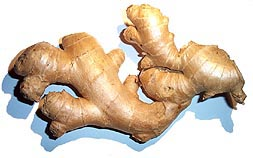
A harvested ginger rhizome

- True roots:
  - Storage taproot – e.g. carrot
  - Tuberous root or root tuber – e.g. Dahlia
- Modified stems:
  - Bulb (a short stem that produces fleshy scale leaves or modified leaf bases) – e.g. Lilium, Narcissus, onion
  - Caudex – e.g. Adenium (desert-rose)
  - Corm – e.g. Crocus
  - Pseudobulb – e.g. Pleione (windowsill orchid)
  - Rhizome – e.g. Iris pseudacorus (yellow flag iris)
  - Stem tuber – e.g. Zantedeschia (arum lily), potato
  - Trophopod (the persistent petiole base of several fern genera) – e.g. Diplazium, Onoclea sensibilis
- Others:
  - Storage hypocotyl (the stem of a seedling) – sometimes called a tuber, as in Cyclamen

Some of the above, particularly pseudobulbs and caudices, may occur wholly or partially above ground. Intermediates and combinations of the above are also found, making classification difficult. As an example of an intermediate, the tuber of Cyclamen arises from the stem of the seedling, which forms the junction of the roots and stem of the mature plant. In some species (e.g. Cyclamen coum) roots come from the bottom of the tuber, suggesting that it is a stem tuber; in others (e.g. Cyclamen hederifolium) roots come largely from the top of the tuber, suggesting that it is a root tuber. As an example of a combination, juno irises have both bulbs and storage roots.

Underground storage organs used for food may be generically called root vegetables, although this phrase should not be taken to imply that the class only includes true roots.

== Other storage organs ==
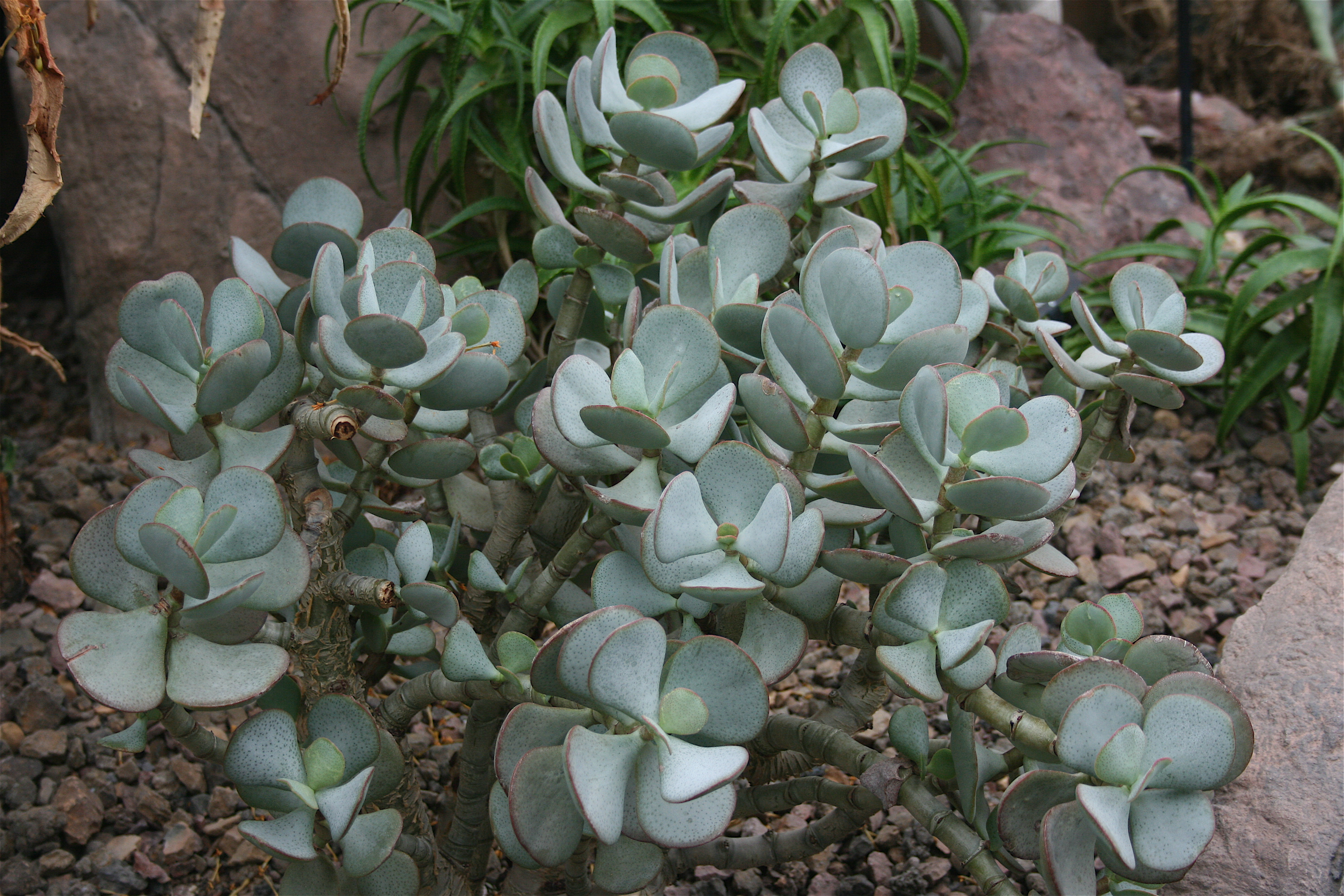
Crassula arborescens, a leaf succulent

Succulents are plants which are adapted to withstand periods of drought by their ability to store moisture in specialized storage organs.

- Leaf succulents store water in their leaves, which are thus thickened, fleshy and typically covered with a waxy coating or fine hairs to reduce evaporation. They may also contain mucilaginous compounds. Some leaf succulents have leaves which are distributed along the stem in a similar fashion to non-succulent species (e.g. Crassula, Kalanchoe); their stems may also be succulent. In others, the leaves are more compact, forming a rosette (e.g. Echeveria, Aloe). Pebble-plants or living stones (e.g. Lithops, Conophytum) have reduced their leaves to just two, forming a fleshy body, only the top of which may be visible above ground.

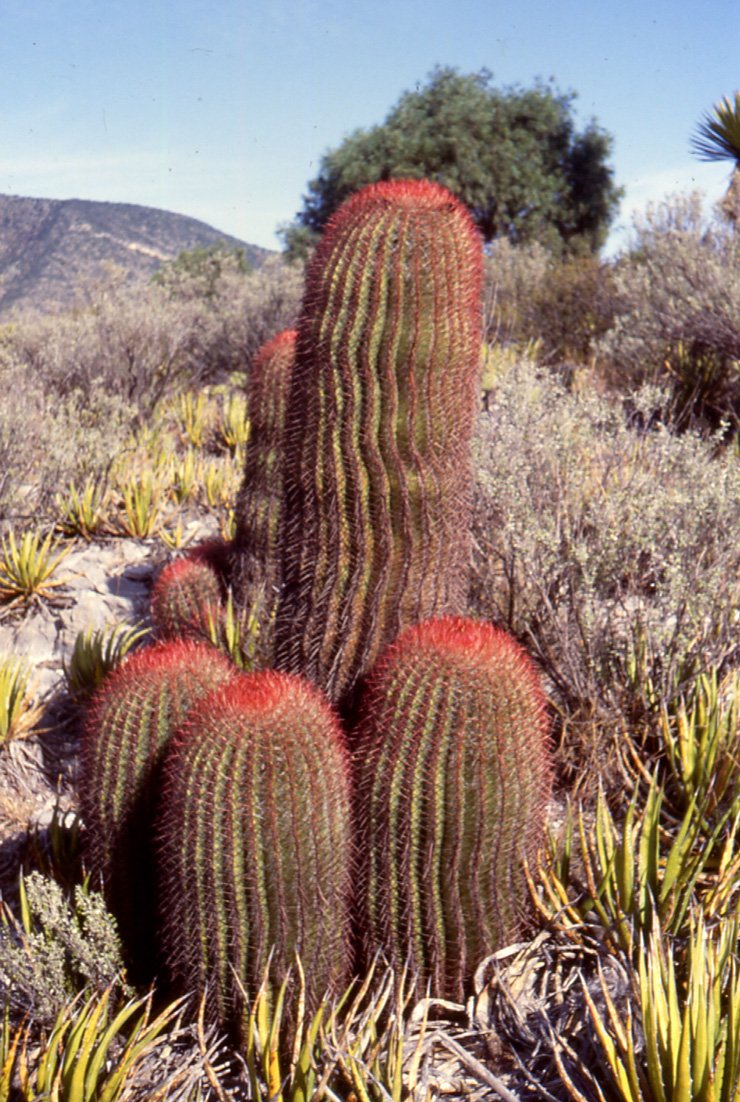
Ferocactus pilosus (Mexican lime cactus), a stem succulent

- Stem succulents are generally either leafless or have leaves which can be quickly shed in the event of drought. Photosynthesis is then taken over by the stems. As with leaf succulents, stems may be covered with a waxy coating or fine hairs to reduce evaporation. The ribbed bodies of cacti may be an adaption to allow shrinkage and expansion with the amount of water stored. Plants of the same general form as cacti are found in other families (e.g. Euphorbia canariensis (family Euphorbiaceae), Stapelia (family Apocynaceae)).
