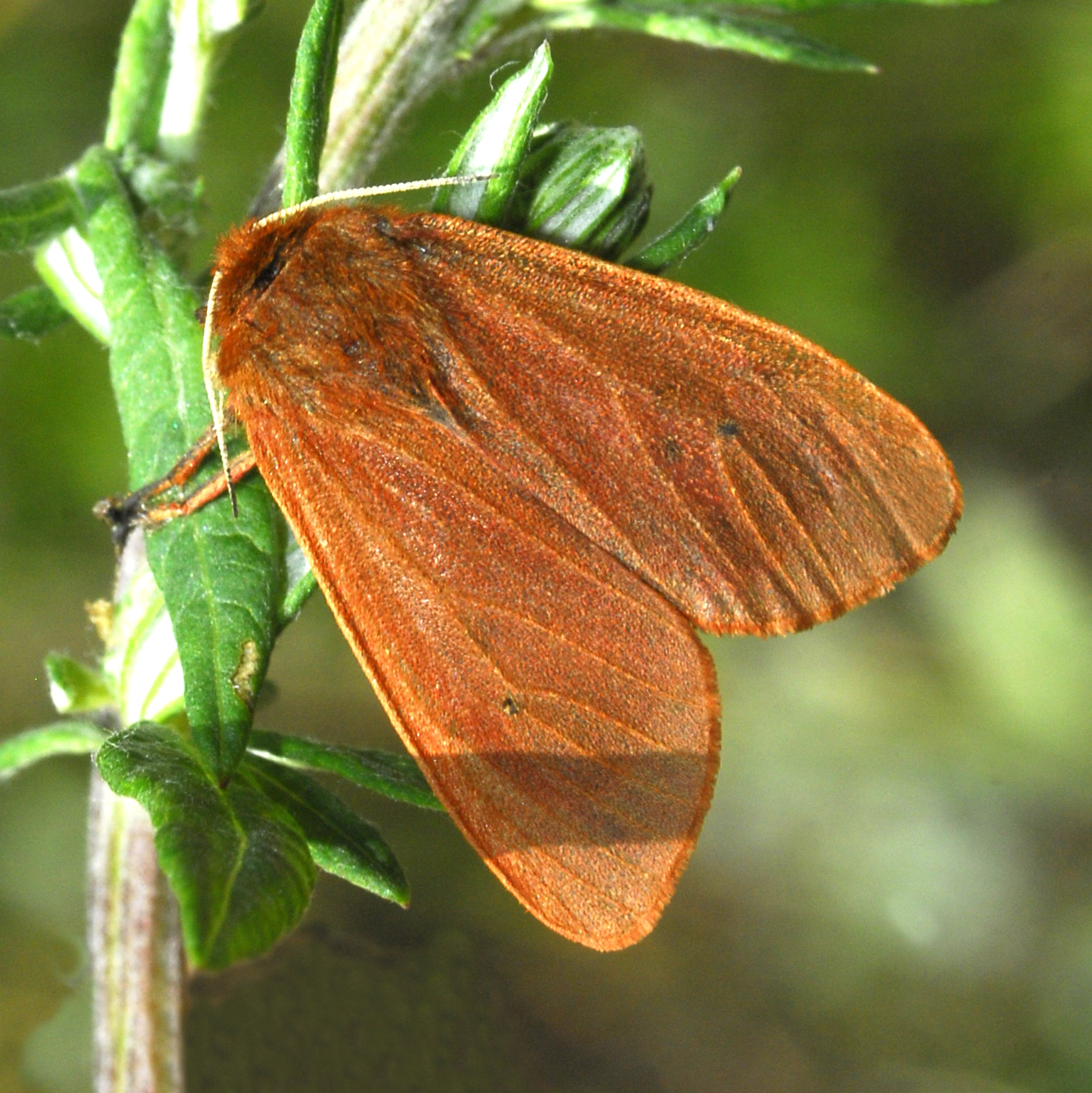
- Phragmatobia fuliginosa

Scientific classification
- Domain: Eukaryota
- Kingdom: Animalia
- Phylum: Arthropoda
- Class: Insecta
- Order: Lepidoptera
- Superfamily: Noctuoidea
- Family: Erebidae
- Subfamily: Arctiinae
- Subtribe: Spilosomina
- Genus: Phragmatobia; Stephens, 1828

Type species
- Phalaena fuliginosa Linnaeus, 1758

= Phragmatobia =

Genus of moths

Phragmatobia is a genus of moths in the subfamily Arctiinae described by James Francis Stephens in 1828. Many tiger-moth species of small and medium size were described within this genus. However, only a few are related to the type species.

== Species ==
- Phragmatobia amurensis Seitz, 1910
- Phragmatobia assimilans Walker, 1855
- Phragmatobia fuliginosa (Linnaeus, 1758)
- Phragmatobia lineata Newman & Donahue, 1966
- Phragmatobia placida (Frivaldszky, 1835)

All other species were separated into different genera, or still remain in Phragmatobia and wait for reviewers:

- Phragmatobia coelestina Püngeler, 1904 - in Orontobia
- Phragmatobia fervida (Walker, 1855) - in Sonorarctia
- Phragmatobia flavata (Hampson, 1901)
- Phragmatobia flavescens (Rothschild, 1933) - in Andesobia
- Phragmatobia fumipennis Hampson, 1891 - in Bucaea
- Phragmatobia hodeva (Druce, 1897) - in Allanwatsonia
- Phragmatobia karsholti Toulgoët, 1991
- Phragmatobia luctifera [Denis & Schiffermüller], 1775 - in Epatolmis
- Phragmatobia modesta Maassen, 1890 - in Amastus
- Phragmatobia nundar Dyar, 1907 - in Sonorarctia
- Phragmatobia oberthueri Rothschild, 1910 - in Lymantriidae
- Phragmatobia parvula (Felder, 1874) - in Pseudophragmatobia
- Phragmatobia sanguinea (Hampson, 1907)
- Phragmatobia thursbyi (Rothschild, 1910)
