= Endemic Maltese wildlife =

The Maltese Islands, although small in area (316 km^{2}), host many endemic species. This may make the organism endangered. These endemic species are important to the Maltese Islands because they form part of Maltese national heritage and are topics of scientific research.

== Introduction ==
Of the 10,000 estimated terrestrial and freshwater species in the Maltese archipelago, 78 are endemic, a large number considering the country's size. Only 4,500 species have so far been identified, and others still await correct taxonomic classification, which means that there may be several more endemic species yet to be discovered.

Twenty-three of the endemic species are vascular plants and plants such as bryophytes, while the remaining 55 species are animals.

== Plants ==
Malta hosts around 860 plants of indigenous nature, occurring in the archipelago before man. Another 20 taxa are considered archaeophytes, being introduced through human intervention but having established themselves before 1500 AD A further 180 taxa are of uncertain origin, whilst at least 640 taxa are considered neophytes, having been introduced after 1500 AD, and may include casual alien species. Most importantly, at least 24 endemic vascular plants, and 18 vascular plants that are sub-endemic to the Mediterranean region.

=== Endemic vascular plants ===
| Image | Species name |
|---|---|
| | Allium lojaconoi |
| | Allium melitense (until 2018) |
| | Anacamptis pyramidalis var. urvilleana |
| | Anthemis urvilleana |
| | Anthyllis hermanniae subsp. melitensis |
| | Atriplex lanfrancoi |
| | Cheirolophus crassifolius |
| | Chiliadenus bocconei |
| | Euphorbia melitensis |
| | Helichrysum panormitanum subsp. melitense, syn. Helichrysum melitense |
| | Hyoseris frutescens |
| | Legousia hybrida var. foliosa (extinct) |
| | Limonium melitense |
| | Limonium zeraphae |
| | Matthiola incana subsp. melitensis |
| | Ophrys bombyliflora var. parviflora |
| | Ophrys hospitalis |
| | Ophrys melitensis |
| | Orobanche densiflora |
| | Orobanche mutelii var. melitensis |
| | Polypodium vulgare subsp. melitense |
| | Romulea melitensis |
| | Salsola melitensis |
| | Sedum album subsp. rupi-melitense |
| | Zannichellia melitensis |

=== Sub-endemic vascular plants ===
| Image | Species name |
|---|---|
| | Calendula maritima |
| | Calendula suffruticosa subsp. fulgida var. gussonei |
| | Daucus carota subsp. rupestris |
| | Daucus lopadusanus |
| | Desmazeria pignattii |
| | Elatine gussonei |
| | Euphorbia exigua var. pycnophylla |
| | Filago cossyrensis |
| | Moraea sisyrinchium var. Moraea sicula |
| | Hymenolobus revelierei subsp. sommieri |
| | Iris pallida synonym Iris sicula |
| | Linaria pseudolaxiflora |
| | Ophrys caesiella |
| | Ophrys calliantha |
| | Ophrys lunulata |
| | Romulea linaresii |
| | Scilla sicula also known as Scilla peruviana |
| | Senecio pygmaeus |

== Animals ==
There are more endemic animals than plants in the Maltese Islands, they are often subspecies of species in nearby countries e.g. the Sicilian shrew in Gozo which has been defined as a subspecies of its own. Endemic animal species include:

| Image | Species name |
|---|---|
| | Maltese field beetle (Pimelia rugulosa ssp. melitana) |
| | Maltese honey bee (Apis mellifera ssp. ruttneri) |
| | Schembri's spider fly (Ogcodes schembrii) |
| | Maltese ruby tiger moth (Phragmatobia fuliginosa ssp. melitensis) |
| | Maltese swallowtail (Papilio machaon ssp. melitensis) |
| | Maltese freshwater crab (Potamon fluviatile ssp. lanfrancoi) |
| | Maltese palpigrade (Eukoenia christiani) |
| | Maltese wall lizard (Podarcis filfolensis - this species has many subspecies, four of which are endemic to the Maltese Islands) |
| | Sicilian shrew (Crocidura sicula ssp. calypso) |
| | Esther's gecko mite (Gekobia estherae) |

== See also ==
- Flora of Malta
- List of birds of Malta
- List of mammals of Malta
