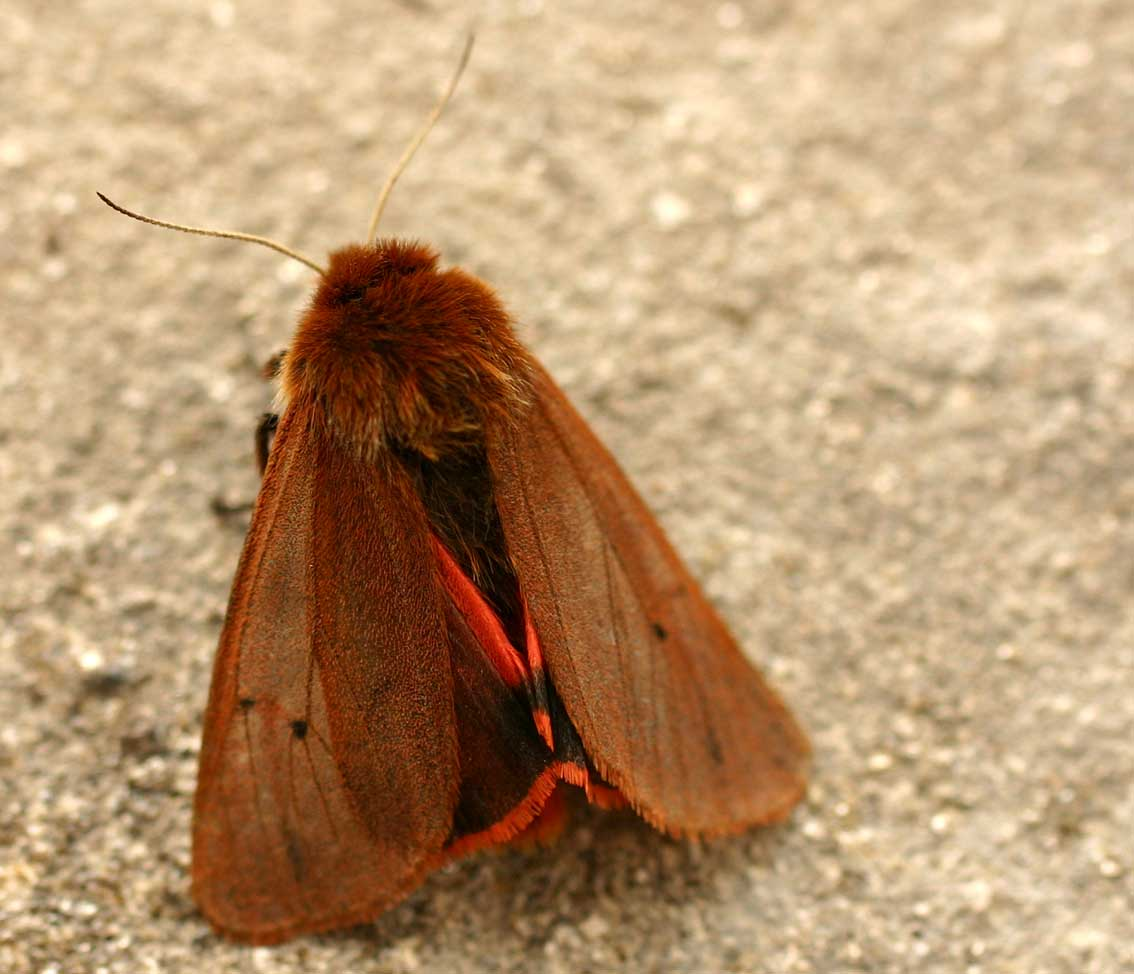
- Phragmatobia fuliginosa, Dorsal view
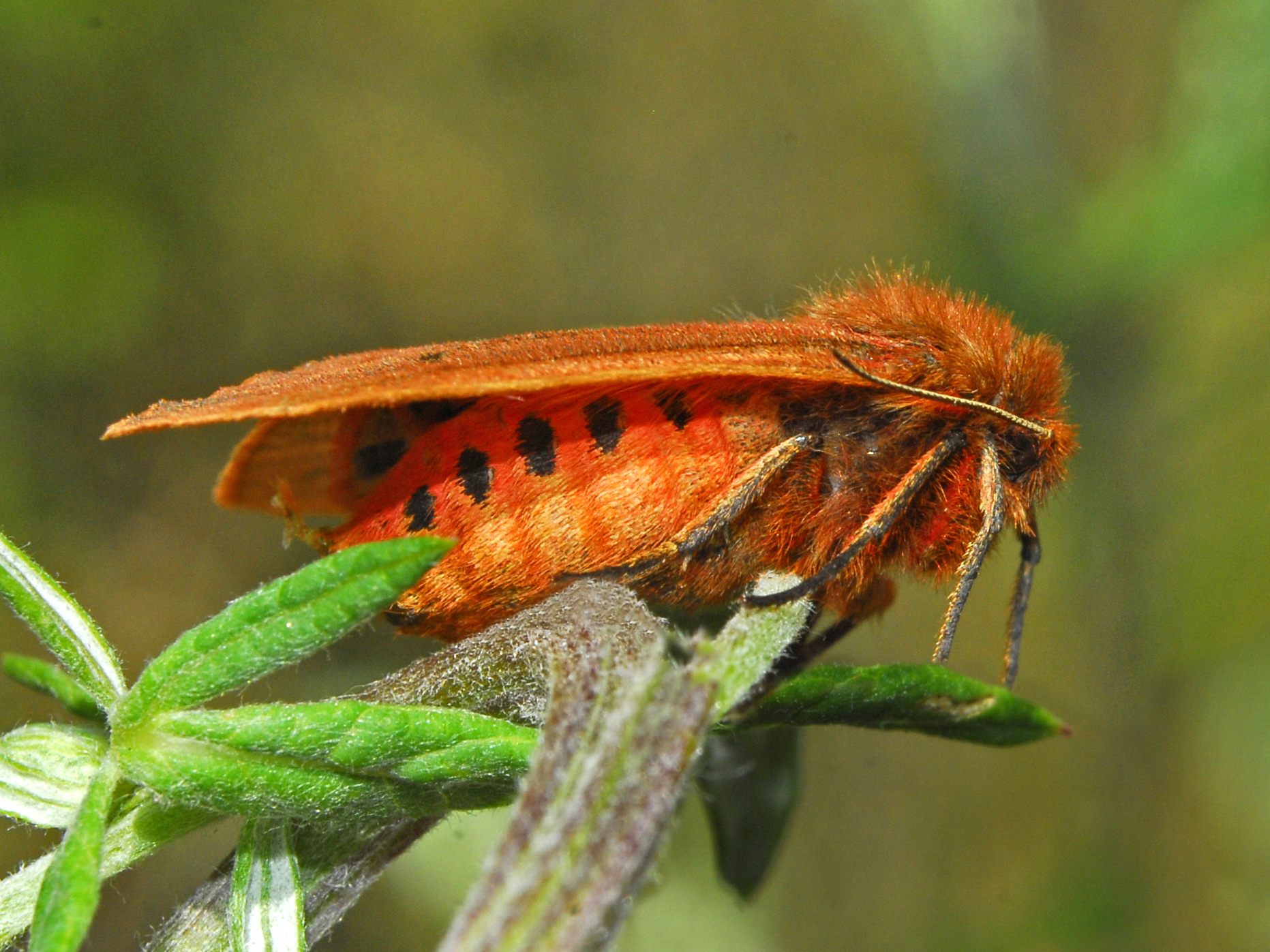
- Side view

Scientific classification
- Kingdom: Animalia
- Phylum: Arthropoda
- Clade: Pancrustacea
- Class: Insecta
- Order: Lepidoptera
- Superfamily: Noctuoidea
- Family: Erebidae
- Subfamily: Arctiinae
- Genus: Phragmatobia
- Species: P. fuliginosa

Binomial name
- Phragmatobia fuliginosa (Linnaeus, 1758)

Synonyms
- List: Phalaena (Noctua) fuliginosa Linnaeus, 1758; Spilosoma fuliginosa fervida Staudinger, 1871; Phragmatobia fuliginosa lurida Rothschild, 1910; Phragmatobia fuliginosa meridionalis Tutt, 1904; Phragmatobia fuliginosa totirubra Vorbrodt, 1914; Phragmatobia fuliginosa monticola Daniel, 1970; Spilosoma fuliginosa borealis Staudinger, 1871; Phalaena fuliginosa melitensis O. Bang-Haas, 1927; Phragmatobia fuliginosa nawari Ebert, 1973 (only a darker mountain form); Spilosoma fuliginosa pulverulenta Alphéraky, 1889; Phragmatobia fuliginosa pallida Rothschild, 1910; Phragmatobia fuliginosa thibetica Strand, 1919; Arctia rubricosa Harris, 1841; Phragmatobia dallii Packard, 1870

= Phragmatobia fuliginosa =

Ruby tiger

Species of moth

Phragmatobia fuliginosa, the ruby tiger, is a moth of the family Erebidae.

== Subspecies ==
Subspecies include:

- Phragmatobia fuliginosa borealis (Staudinger, 1871) in Scotland and in northern regions of Eurasia
- Phragmatobia fuliginosa melitensis (O. Bang-Haas, 1927) (Malta)
- Phragmatobia fuliginosa paghmani (Lének, 1966) (Transcaucasia: Azerbaijan; Iran; northern Iraq; Afghanistan; Central Asia; southern Kazakhstan; China: western Xinjiang)
- Phragmatobia fuliginosa pulverulenta (Alphéraky, 1889) (China: eastern Xinjiang, Qinghai, Nei Mongol; southern aimaks of Mongolia; south-eastern Kazakhstan, partly)
- Phragmatobia fuliginosa rubricosa (Harris, 1841) (North America)
- Phragmatobia fuliginosa taurica (Daniel, 1970) (Near East: from southern Turkey to Palestina)

== Distribution ==
Phragmatobia fuliginosa can be found in the Palearctic realm. It is present in most of Europe, in North Africa, Russia, Central Asia, Tibet, and in northern areas of North America.

== Habitat ==
This species inhabits moist open forest and meadow areas, mixed hardwood forests at low elevations, open meadows or prairies and in agricultural areas at low elevations. It is common on low-growing plants, on high-roads, railway embankments and waste fields. On warm days in the winter the larvae sometimes leave their hiding-places and are then found on fieldpaths and roads, running about quickly.

== Technical description ==
Phragmatobia fuliginosa has a wingspan of 35–45 mm. The ruby tiger has the thorax and forewings dark reddish brown with a blackish comma-shaped spot at the apex of the cell, edged with carmine. Hindwings are carmine, more or less hyaline in the costal area, with more or less confluent black spots before the margin and at the apex of the cell.

The name-typical form ''Phragmatobia fuliginosa L. has the forewing rather densely scaled and the hindwing bright rose-red with distinct black spots. Underside strongly suffused with purple-pink.

The eggs are reddish grey. The larva is light or dark grey with a black brown head. The entire body is covered with foxy red hairs. These hairs are always more black brown in placida, and sometimes so in fuliginosa. The pupa is black with the abdomen marked with yellow in the segmental incision.

== Variations ==
Phragmatobia fuliginosa borealis has vivid black markings and the red is confined to the sides of the abdomen and the anal part of the hindwing. Phragmatobia fuliginosa ab. subnigra Mill., that has very dark forewings, must not be confused with the northern form; it is scarcely darker than true fuliginosa, and not so strongly hyaline as borealis. In Phragmatobia fuliginosa ab. flavescens Schultz the abdomen and hindwing are yellow instead of red. The full species Phragmatobia amurensis Seitz, 1910 is a form of the same size as Phragmatobia fervida, but is in colour it is almost exactly like fuliginosa, the forewing however being broader. Phragmatobia pulverulenta Alph. is a transition to fervida, the forewing being lighter than in fuliginosa, more yellowish brown, and the hindwing lighter and clearer, more flesh-colour, and with well-defined marginal spots. Phragmatobia fuliginosa fervida Stgr., from Turkestan and northern China, is the largest and lightest form. The forewings are strongly tinged with yellowish red, and therefore almost the same colour as the hindwings, the latter bear strongly reduced dots. Phragmatobia placida Friv., from South-East Europe, Asia, Minor and Turkestan, is a very large form, usually regarded as a separate species [Phragmatobia placida (Frivaldszky, 1835)], with the forewing more triangular and uniformly dark brown, and the hindwing pure light pink spotted with black. The forewing bears a carmine dot at the upper angle of the cell.

== Biology ==
The moth flies from May to August depending on the location. It is double-brooded in the south of England, flying in April to June, and again in August and September. In the north it is a univoltine species, with just one generation in June.

The caterpillars are polyphagous, feeding on various plants, mainly Rubus fruticosus, Prunus spinosa, Filipendula ulmaria, Plantago lanceolata, Senecio jacobaea, Salix repens, Salix starkeana, Salix phylicifolia, Polygonum spp., Rumex crispus, Potentilla erecta, Rubus idaeus, Trifolium spp., Chamaenerion angustifolium, Calluna vulgaris, Vaccinium myrtillus, Vaccinium uliginosum, Andromeda polifolia, Plantago major, Taraxacum vulgare and Taraxacum officinale.

== Gallery ==
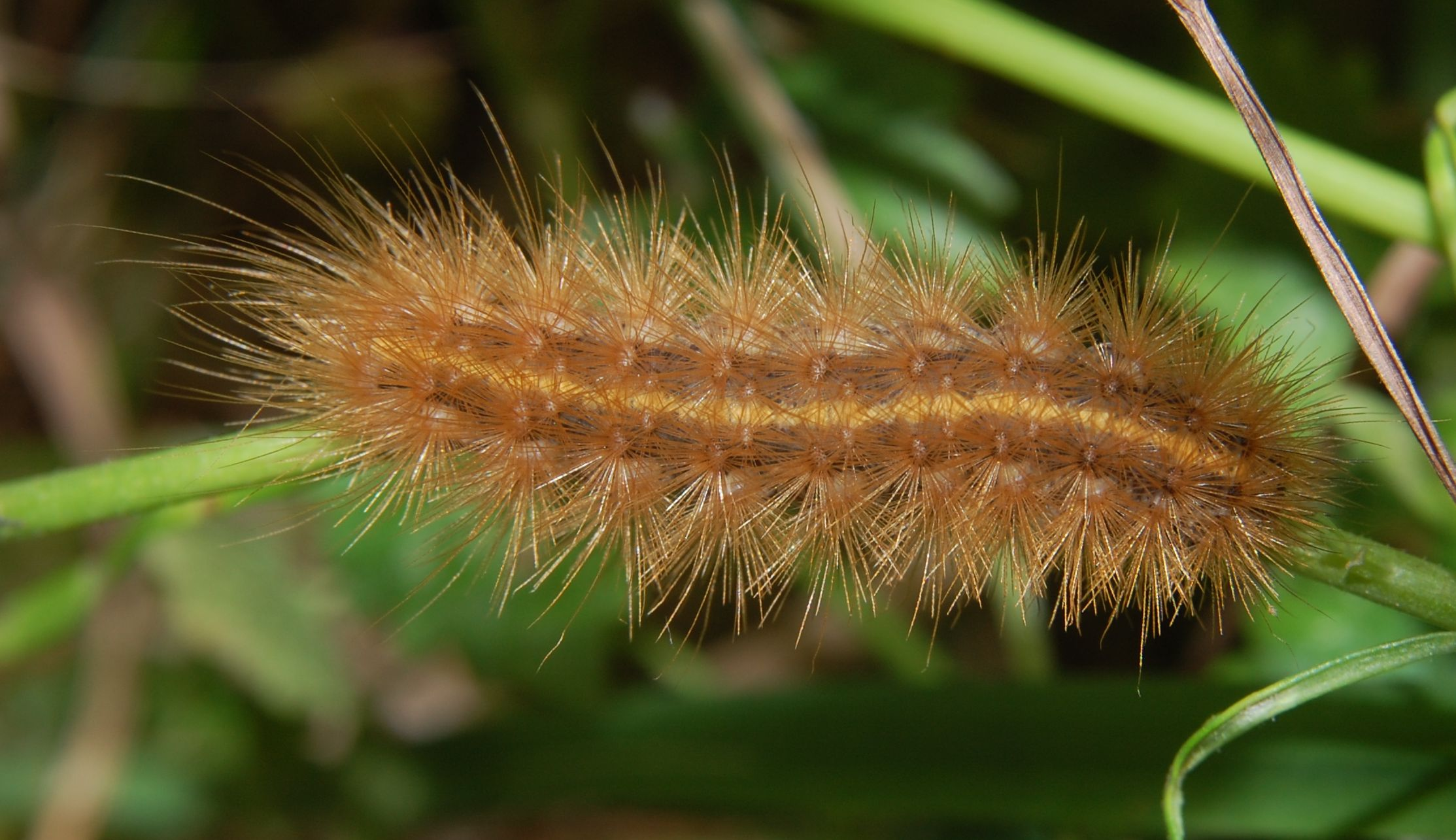
Caterpillar

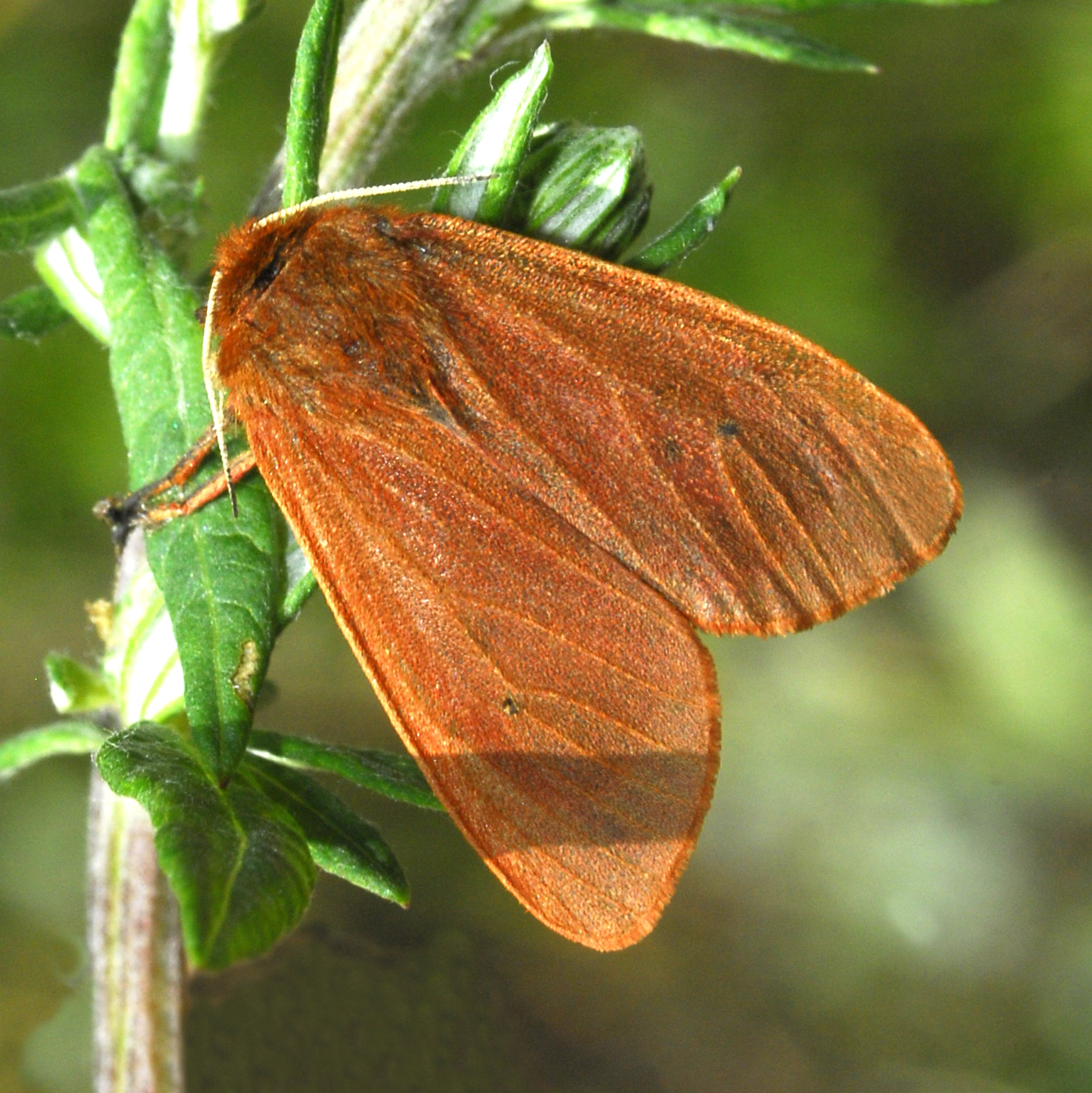
Moth

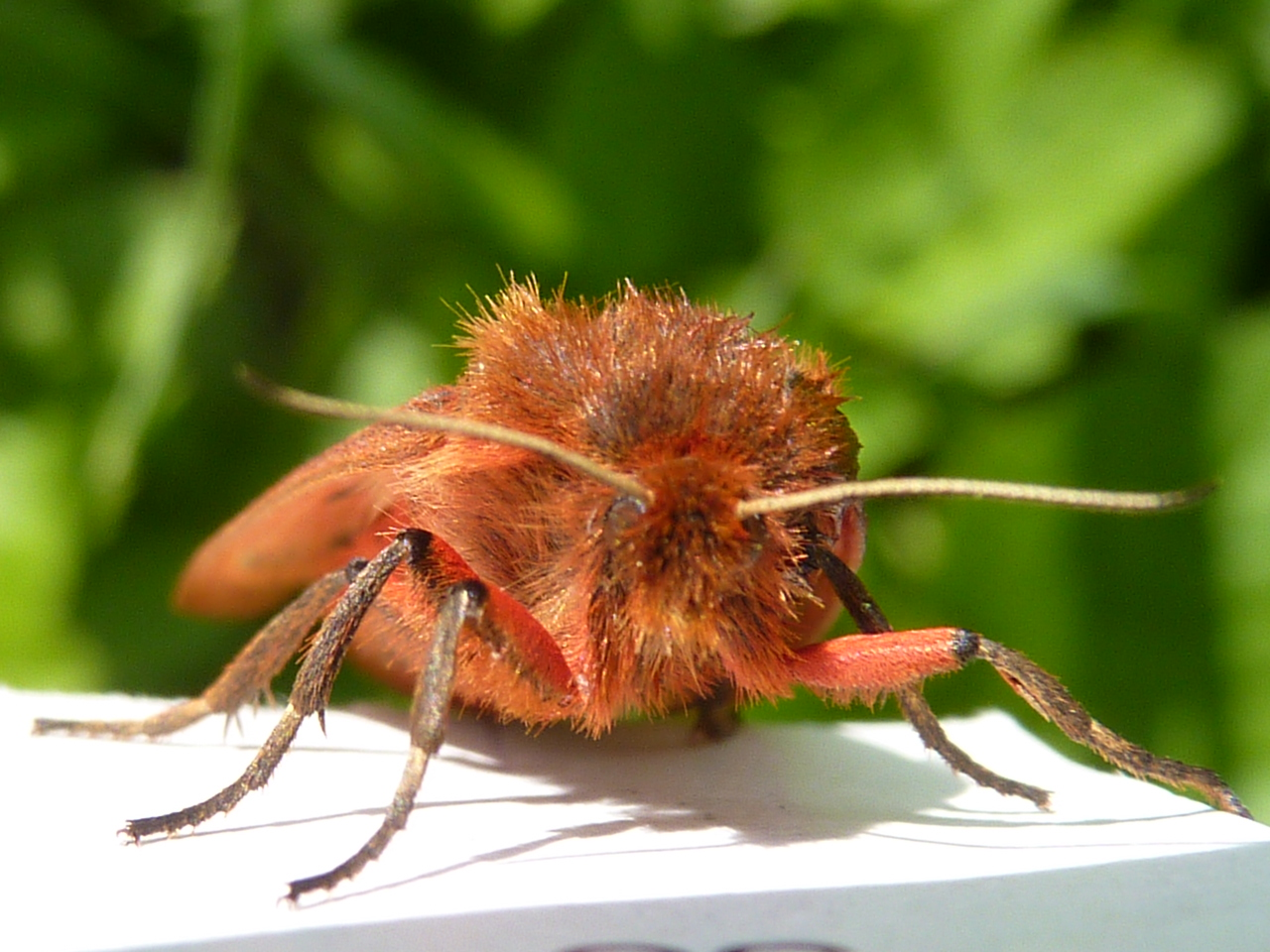
Front view

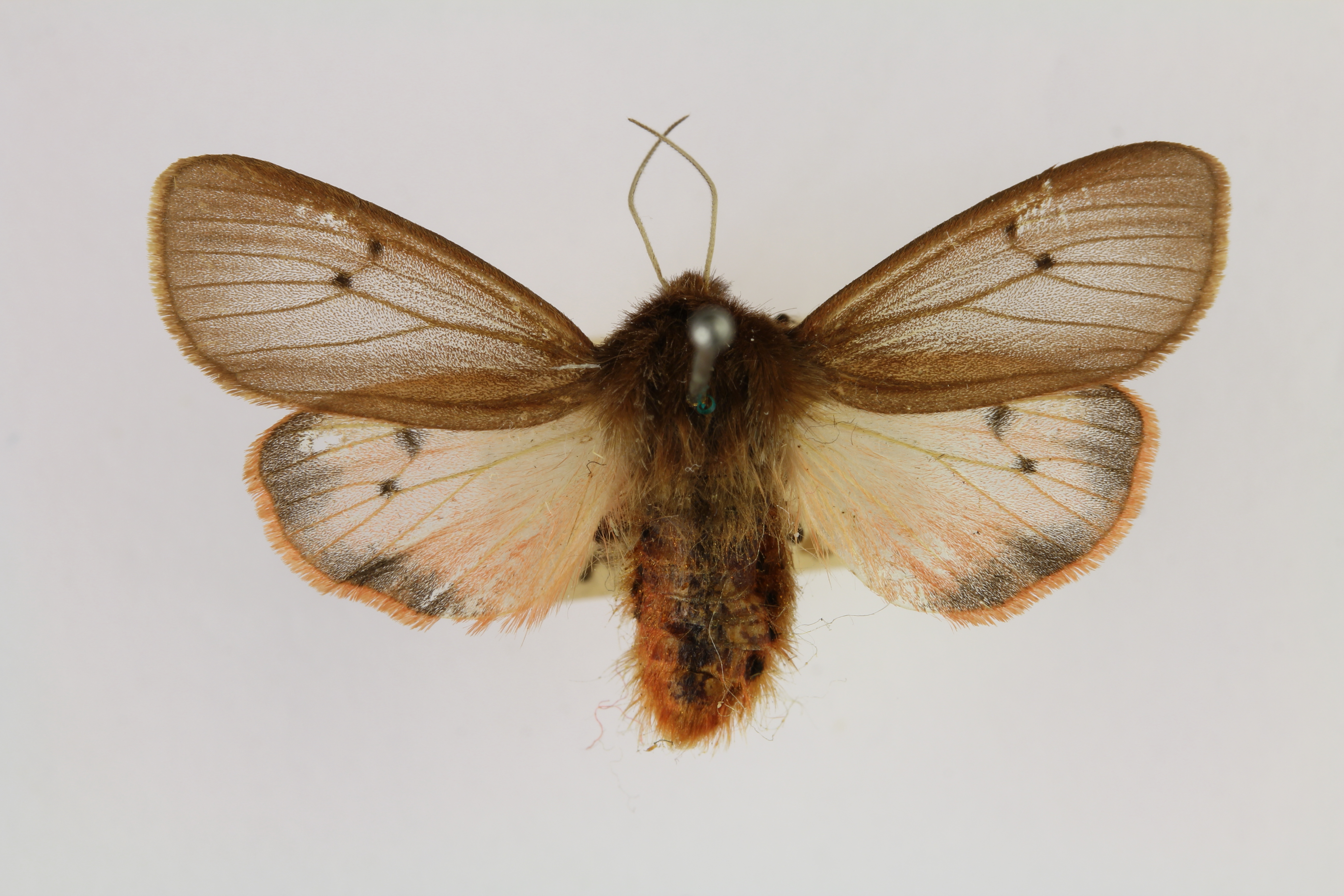
Mounted specimen
