= Maltese ruby tiger moth =

Scientific classification
- Domain: Eukaryota
- Kingdom: Animalia
- Phylum: Arthropoda
- Class: Insecta
- Order: Lepidoptera
- Superfamily: Noctuoidea
- Family: Erebidae
- Subfamily: Arctiinae
- Genus: Phragmatobia
- Species: P. fuliginosa
- Subspecies: P. f. melitensis

Trinomial name
- Phragmatobia fuliginosa melitensis (O. Bang-Haas, 1927)

Subspecies of moth

The Maltese ruby tiger moth (Phragmatobia fuliginosa melitensis) is a subspecies of moth endemic to the Maltese Islands. It was first described by Otto Bang-Haas in 1927. It belongs to the subfamily Arctiinae.

== General features ==
This moth, known as the rubin in Maltese, has a wingspan of 30–35 mm. Its head and body are hairy; head and thorax reddish brown; abdomen red with black spots; wings translucent; forewing reddish brown with black reniform spot; hindwing bright pink with black discal spot and uneven black spotting along outer margin.

The caterpillar looks rather furry, a feature common in Arctiinae caterpillars, which are known as "woolly bears".

== Food ==
The caterpillar feeds on borage (Borago officinalis) (known as fidloqqom in Maltese), and on bugloss (plants from the genus Echium e.g. pale bugloss (Echium italicum) which is known as lsien il-fart abjad in Maltese).

== Population ==
The Maltese ruby tiger moth, although endemic, is common throughout the Maltese Islands.

== See also ==
- Endemic Maltese wildlife
- Endemism
- Arctiidae (tiger moths)
