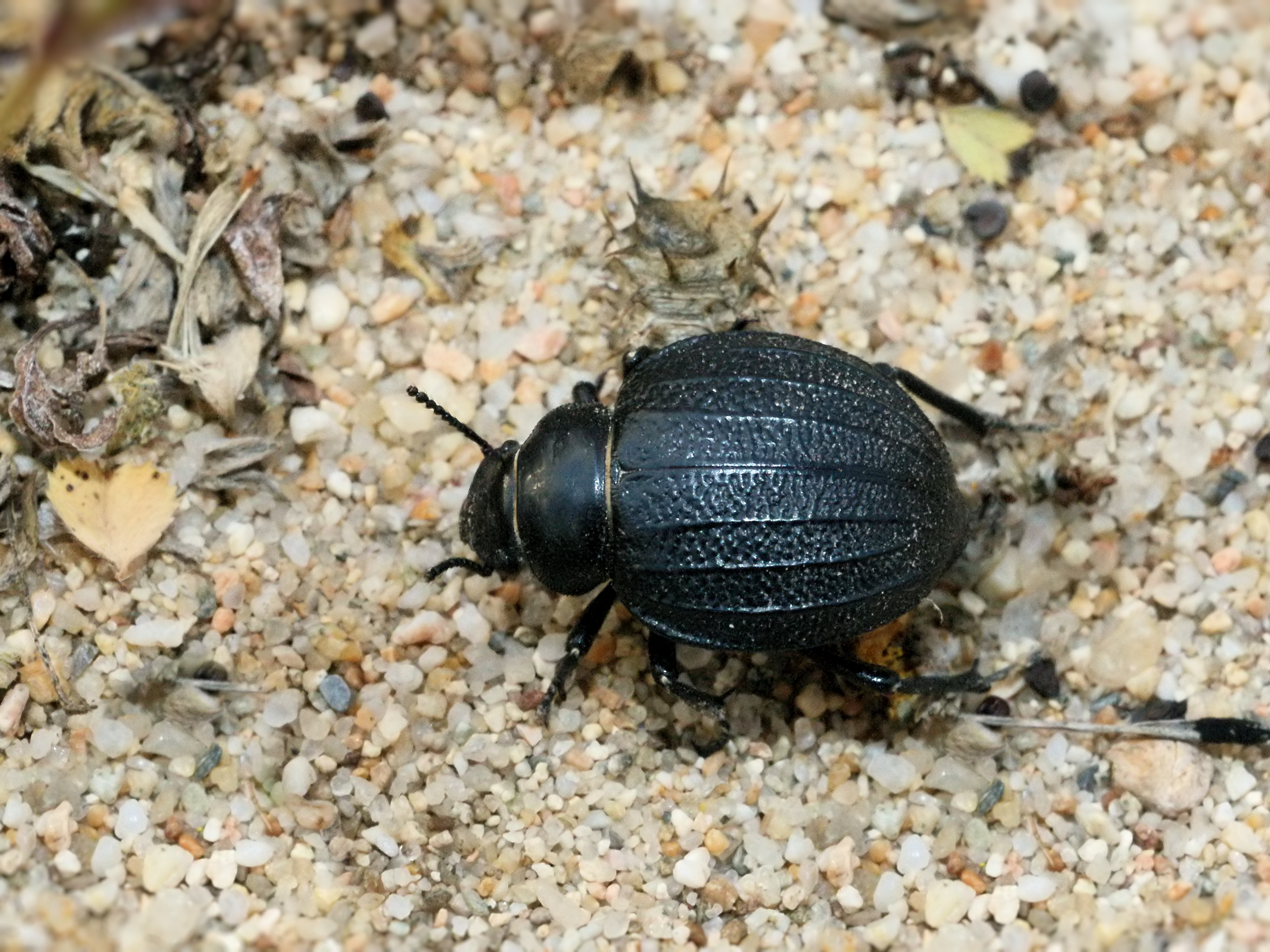
- Pimelia bipunctata, Italy

Scientific classification
- Kingdom: Animalia
- Phylum: Arthropoda
- Class: Insecta
- Order: Coleoptera
- Suborder: Polyphaga
- Infraorder: Cucujiformia
- Family: Tenebrionidae
- Subfamily: Pimeliinae
- Tribe: Pimeliini; Latreille, 1802

= Pimeliini =

Tribe of beetles

Pimeliini is a tribe of darkling beetles in the subfamily Pimeliinae of the family Tenebrionidae. There are more than 60 genera in Pimeliini, found primarily in the Palearctic.

== Genera ==
These genera belong to the tribe Pimeliini

- Afghanopachys Kwieton, 1978 (the Palearctic)
- Allotadzhikistania Bogatchev, 1960 (the Palearctic)
- Apatopsis Semenov, 1891 (the Palearctic)
- Argyradelpha G.S. Medvedev, 2005 (the Palearctic)
- Argyrophana Semenov, 1889 (the Palearctic)
- Astorthocnemis Lillig & Pavlícek, 2002 (the Palearctic)
- Balachowskya Peyerimhoff, 1928 (the Palearctic)
- Bogatshevia G.S. Medvedev & Iwan, 2006 (the Palearctic)
- Cyclocnera Leo, 2018 (the Palearctic)
- Diesia Fischer von Waldheim, 1820 (the Palearctic)
- Dietomorpha Reymond, 1938 (the Palearctic)
- Earophanta Semenov, 1903 (the Palearctic)
- Euryostola Reitter, 1893 (the Palearctic)
- Euthriptera Reitter, 1893 (the Palearctic)
- Gedeon Reiche & Saulcy, 1857 (the Palearctic)
- Habrobates Semenov, 1903 (the Palearctic)
- Habrochiton Semenov, 1907 (the Palearctic)
- Homopsis Semenov, 1893 (the Palearctic)
- Idiesa Reitter, 1893 (the Palearctic)
- Iranolasiostola Pierre, 1968 (the Palearctic)
- Iranopachyscelis Pierre, 1968 (the Palearctic)
- Kawiria Schuster, 1935 (the Palearctic)
- Lasiostola Dejean, 1834 (the Palearctic)
- Leucolaephus P.H. Lucas, 1859 (the Palearctic)
- Mantichorula Reitter, 1889 (the Palearctic)
- Meladiesia Reitter, 1909 (the Palearctic)
- Ocnera Fischer von Waldheim, 1822 (the Palearctic)
- Pachylodera Quedenfeldt, 1890 (the Palearctic)
- Pachyscelina Kwieton, 1978 (the Palearctic)
- Pachyscelis Solier, 1836 (the Palearctic)
- Paraplatyope Löbl, Bouchard, Merkl & Bousquet, 2020 (the Palearctic)
- Pelorocnemis Solsky, 1876 (the Palearctic)
- Phymatiotris Solier, 1836 (the Palearctic)
- Pimelia Fabricius, 1775 (the Palearctic, tropical Africa, and Indomalaya)
- Pimeliocnera Reitter, 1909 (the Palearctic)
- Pimelipachys Skopin, 1962 (the Palearctic)
- Pisterotarsa Motschulsky, 1860 (the Palearctic)
- Platyesia Skopin, 1971 (the Palearctic)
- Platyope Fischer von Waldheim, 1820 (the Palearctic)
- Podhomala Solier, 1836 (the Palearctic)
- Polpogenia Solier, 1836 (tropical Africa)
- Prionotheca Dejean, 1834 (the Palearctic and tropical Africa)
- Przewalskia Semenov, 1893 (the Palearctic)
- Pseudopachyscelis Skopin, 1968 (the Palearctic)
- Pseudoplatyope Pierre, 1964 (the Palearctic)
- Pseudopodhomala Schuster, 1938 (the Palearctic)
- Pseudostorthocnemis Gridelli, 1952 (the Palearctic)
- Pterocoma Dejean, 1834 (the Palearctic)
- Pterolasia Solier, 1836 (the Palearctic and tropical Africa)
- Scelace Marseul, 1887 (the Palearctic)
- Spectrocnera Kwieton, 1981 (tropical Africa)
- Stalagmoptera Solsky, 1876 (the Palearctic)
- Sternocnera Skopin, 1964 (the Palearctic)
- Sternodes Fischer von Waldheim, 1837 (the Palearctic)
- Sternoplax Frivaldszky, 1890 (the Palearctic)
- Sternotrigon Skopin, 1973 (the Palearctic)
- Storthocnemis Karsch, 1881 (the Palearctic and tropical Africa)
- Tadzhikistania Bogatchev, 1960 (the Palearctic)
- Thriptera Solier, 1836 (the Palearctic and tropical Africa)
- Trachyderma Latreille, 1828 (the Palearctic, tropical Africa, and Australasia)
- Trigonocnera Reitter, 1893 (the Palearctic)
- Trigonopachys Skopin, 1968 (the Palearctic)
- Trigonoscelis Dejean, 1834 (the Palearctic)
- Waterhousia Skopin, 1973 (the Palearctic)
