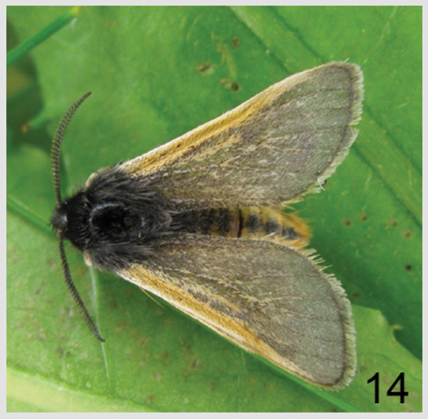

Scientific classification
- Domain: Eukaryota
- Kingdom: Animalia
- Phylum: Arthropoda
- Class: Insecta
- Order: Lepidoptera
- Superfamily: Noctuoidea
- Family: Erebidae
- Subfamily: Arctiinae
- Subtribe: Spilosomina
- Genus: Andesobia; Schmidt and De Freina, 2011

= Andesobia =

Genus of moths

Andesobia is a genus of moths in the subfamily Arctiinae.

== Species ==
- Andesobia boliviana (Gaede, 1923)
- Andesobia flavata (Hampson, 1901)
- Andesobia jelskii (Oberthür, 1881)
- Andesobia sanguinea (Hampson, 1907)

== Etymology ==
The name is feminine in gender, formed by combining the words Andes and –obia from the generic name Phragmatobia.
