= Phragmatobia lineata =

Lined ruby tiger moth

Scientific classification
- Kingdom: Animalia
- Phylum: Arthropoda
- Clade: Pancrustacea
- Class: Insecta
- Order: Lepidoptera
- Superfamily: Noctuoidea
- Family: Erebidae
- Subfamily: Arctiinae
- Genus: Phragmatobia
- Species: P. lineata

Binomial name
- Phragmatobia lineata Newman & Donahue, 1966

Species of moth

Phragmatobia lineata, the lined ruby tiger moth, is a moth in the family Erebidae. It was described by Newman and Donahue in 1966. It is found from the north-eastern United States, west to Manitoba and Alberta. The habitat consists of prairies.

The wingspan is about 57 mm. Adults are on wing from early to late May.
