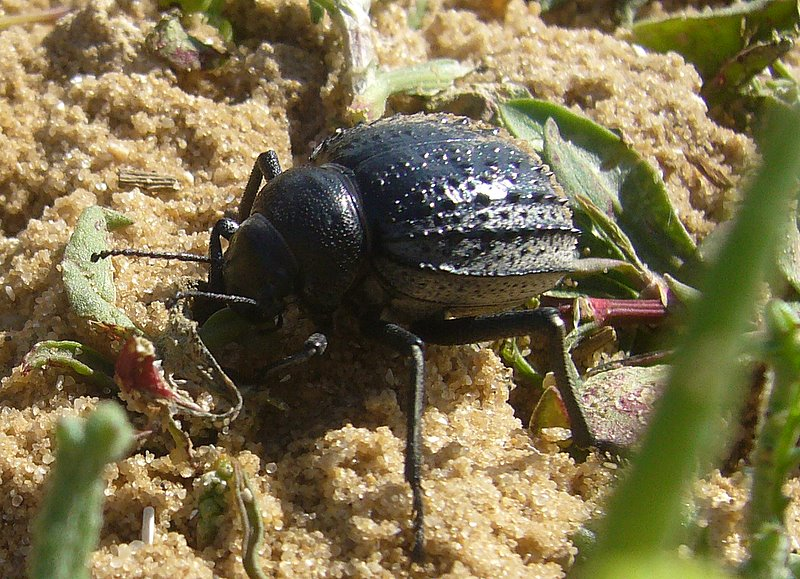
- Pimelia angulata

Scientific classification
- Kingdom: Animalia
- Phylum: Arthropoda
- Clade: Pancrustacea
- Class: Insecta
- Order: Coleoptera
- Suborder: Polyphaga
- Infraorder: Cucujiformia
- Family: Tenebrionidae
- Genus: Pimelia
- Species: P. angulata

Binomial name
- Pimelia angulata Fabricius, 1775

Synonyms
- Pimelia consobrina Lucas, 1858; Pimelia retrospinosa Lucas, 1858

= Pimelia angulata =

Species of beetle

Pimelia angulata is a species of darkling beetles in the subfamily Pimeliinae.

== Subspecies ==
- Pimelia angulata angulata Fabricius, 1775
- Pimelia angulata angulosa Olivier, 1795
- Pimelia angulata antiaegypta Koch, 1937

== Description ==
Pimelia angulata can reach a length of about 25–35 millimetres (0.98–1.38 in). The body is black, slightly glossy. The elytra show a few lines of small spikes or short tubercles. These beetles are diurnal, emerging in early morning and late evening but hiding in small groups under the sand during the hot hours of the day.

== Distribution and habitat ==
This species is present in the lower Egypt, in the northern and south-eastern Sinai, Mauritania, Israel and in Sudan. It is adapted to arid climates and desert environments.

== Bibliography ==
- Niccole D. Rech The Effect of Temperature on Oviposition in Pimelia Angulata (Coleoptera: Tenebrionidae) Minot State University, 2002
- Adolf Andres Note sur Pimelia angulata Fak. et espèces voisines et description d'une variété nouvelle (1929)
- FIORI G., 1954 – Morfologia addominale, anatomia ed istologia degli apparati genitali di «Pimelia angulata Confalonierii» Grid. (Coleoptera Tenebrionidae) e formazione dello spermatoforo. - Boll. Ist. Entom. Univ. Bologna
