= List of mammals of Malta =

This is a list of the mammal species recorded in Malta. There are twenty mammal species in Malta, of which one is critically endangered.

Icons which state each species' global IUCN status:
CR	Critically Endangered	In imminent risk of extinction in the wild
EN	Endangered	Facing an extremely high risk of extinction in the wild
VU	Vulnerable	Facing a high risk of extinction in the wild
NT	Near Threatened	Doesn't meet any of the criteria that would categorise it as risking extinction but likely to in the future
LC	Least Concern	No current identifiable risks to this species
DD	Data Deficient	Inadequate information to make an assessment of the risks to this species

== Order: Eulipotyphla (hedgehogs, shrews and moles) ==
Hedgehogs are easily recognised by their spines, shrews closely resemble mice, and moles are stout-bodied burrowers.

- Family: Erinaceidae (hedgehogs)
  - Subfamily: Erinaceinae
    - Genus: Atelerix
      - North African hedgehog, A. algirus LC
- Family: Soricidae (shrews)
  - Subfamily: Crocidurinae
    - Genus: Crocidura
      - Sicilian shrew, Crocidura sicula LC
    - Genus: Suncus
      - Etruscan shrew, Suncus etruscus LC

== Order: Chiroptera (bats) ==
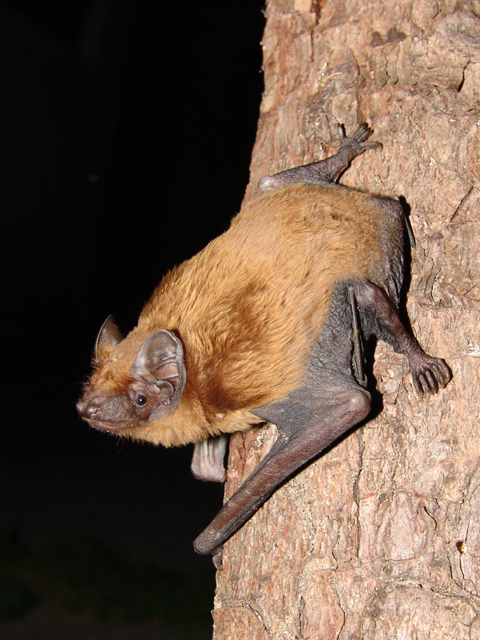
Common noctule

The bats' most distinguishing feature is that their forelimbs are developed as wings, making them the only mammals capable of flight. Bat species account for about 20% of all mammals.

- Family: Vespertilionidae
  - Subfamily: Myotinae
    - Genus: Myotis
      - Greater mouse-eared bat, Myotis myotis LC
      - Felten's myotis, Myotis punicus DD
  - Subfamily: Vespertilioninae
    - Genus: Nyctalus
      - Common noctule, Nyctalus noctula LC
    - Genus: Pipistrellus
      - Kuhl's pipistrelle, Pipistrellus kuhlii LC
      - Common pipistrelle, Pipistrellus pipistrellus LC
    - Genus: Plecotus
      - Grey long-eared bat, Plecotus austriacus NT
  - Subfamily: Miniopterinae
    - Genus: Miniopterus
      - Common bent-wing bat, M. schreibersii VU
- Family: Rhinolophidae
  - Subfamily: Rhinolophinae
    - Genus: Rhinolophus
      - Greater horseshoe bat, Rhinolophus ferrumequinum LC possibly extirpated
      - Lesser horseshoe bat, Rhinolophus hipposideros LC

== Order: Cetacea (whales) ==
The order Cetacea includes whales, dolphins and porpoises. They are the mammals most fully adapted to aquatic life with a spindle-shaped nearly hairless body, protected by a thick layer of blubber, and forelimbs and tail modified to provide propulsion underwater.

- Suborder: Mysticeti
  - Family: Balaenopteridae
    - Genus: Balaenoptera
      - Blue whale, Balaenoptera m. musculus EN (possible)
      - Fin whale, Balaenoptera physalus VU
  - Subfamily: Megapterinae
    - Genus: Megaptera
      - Humpback whale, Megaptera novaeangliae LC (possible)
  - Family: Balaenidae
    - Genus: Eubalaena
      - North Atlantic right whale, Eubalaena glacialis CR (possible)
- Suborder: Odontoceti
  - Superfamily:Physeteroidea
    - Family: Physeteridae (sperm whales)
      - Genus: Physeter
        - Sperm whale, Physeter macrocephalus VU
  - Superfamily: Platanistoidea
    - Family: Delphinidae (oceanic dolphins)
      - Genus: Tursiops
        - Common bottlenose dolphin, Tursiops truncatus LC
      - Genus: Delphinus
        - Short-beaked common dolphin, Delphinus delphis LC
      - Genus: Stenella
        - Striped dolphin, Stenella coeruleoalba LC
      - Genus: Grampus
        - Risso's dolphin, Grampus griseus LC
      - Genus: Pseudorca
        - False killer whale, Pseudorca crassidens NT
      - Genus: Globicephala
        - Long-finned pilot whale, Globicephala melas LC

== Order: Carnivora (carnivorans) ==
There are over 260 species of carnivorans, the majority of which feed primarily on meat. They have a characteristic skull shape and dentition.

- Suborder: Caniformia
  - Family: Mustelidae (mustelids)
    - Genus: Mustela
      - Least weasel, M. nivalis LC possibly introduced
  - Family: Phocidae (earless seals)
    - Genus: Monachus
      - Mediterranean monk seal, M. monachus VU extirpated

== See also ==
- List of chordate orders
- Lists of mammals by region
- List of prehistoric mammals
- Mammal classification
- List of mammals described in the 2000s
