= Orontobia secreta =

Scientific classification
- Domain: Eukaryota
- Kingdom: Animalia
- Phylum: Arthropoda
- Class: Insecta
- Order: Lepidoptera
- Superfamily: Noctuoidea
- Family: Erebidae
- Subfamily: Arctiinae
- Genus: Orontobia
- Species: O. secreta

Binomial name
- Orontobia secreta (Draudt, 1931)

Synonyms
- Oroncus secreta Draudt, 1931; Phragmatobia secreta; Orontobia dalailama kansuensis de Freina, 1997

Species of moth

Orontobia secreta is a moth of the family Erebidae. It was described by Max Wilhelm Karl Draudt in 1931. It is found in China (northern Gansu, Qinghai) and Tibet.

== Subspecies ==
- Orontobia secreta secreta (China: northern Gansu, Qinghai)
- Orontobia secreta dalailama de Freina, 1997 (Tibet)
