= Orontobia murzini =

Scientific classification
- Kingdom: Animalia
- Phylum: Arthropoda
- Clade: Pancrustacea
- Class: Insecta
- Order: Lepidoptera
- Superfamily: Noctuoidea
- Family: Erebidae
- Subfamily: Arctiinae
- Genus: Orontobia
- Species: O. murzini

Binomial name
- Orontobia murzini Dubatolov, 2005

Species of moth

Orontobia murzini is a moth of the family Erebidae. It was described by Vladimir Viktorovitch Dubatolov in 2005. It is found in Sichuan, China.
