= Phragmatobia assimilans =

Large ruby tiger moth

Scientific classification
- Kingdom: Animalia
- Phylum: Arthropoda
- Class: Insecta
- Order: Lepidoptera
- Superfamily: Noctuoidea
- Family: Erebidae
- Subfamily: Arctiinae
- Genus: Phragmatobia
- Species: P. assimilans

Binomial name
- Phragmatobia assimilans Walker, 1855

Synonyms
- Phragmatobia assimilans var. franconia Slosson, 1891; Phragmatobia assimilans var. franconia Slosson, 1893

Species of moth

Phragmatobia assimilans, the large ruby tiger moth, is a moth in the family Erebidae. It was described by Francis Walker in 1855. It is found in North America from Nova Scotia to Connecticut, in the east to British Columbia. There are isolated populations in northern Colorado and the Black Hills of South Dakota. The habitat consists of open meadows and moist forests.

The length of the forewings is 14–19 mm. The forewings dusty medium to dark orange brown with dark grey antemedial and postmedial lines and a dark grey discal spot. The hindwings are pinkish red with a black marginal band and dark veins. Females are usually larger and darker, with the forewing pattern better developed. Adults are on wing from late spring to August in one generation per year.

The larvae feed on various herbaceous plants and low woody hardwood shrubs.
