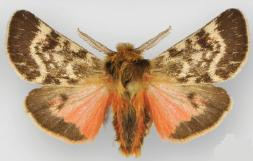

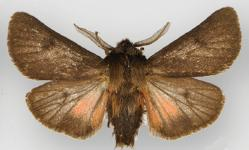

Scientific classification
- Domain: Eukaryota
- Kingdom: Animalia
- Phylum: Arthropoda
- Class: Insecta
- Order: Lepidoptera
- Superfamily: Noctuoidea
- Family: Erebidae
- Subfamily: Arctiinae
- Subtribe: Spilosomina
- Genus: Patagobia; Schmidt & De Freina, 2011
- Species: P. thursbyi

Binomial name
- Patagobia thursbyi (Rothschild, 1910)

Synonyms
- Turuptiana thursbyi Rothschild, 1910; Phragmatobia thursbyi; Phragmatobia thursbyi pluto Toulgoët, 1987

= Patagobia =

Genus of moths

Patagobia is a monotypic moth genus in the subfamily Arctiinae erected by B. Christian Schmidt and Josef J. de Freina in 2011. Its only species, Patagobia thursbyi, was first described by Rothschild in 1910. It is found in Chile and Argentina where it is known from temperate montane woodlands and grasslands in Patagonia.

The forewing length is 12.9–13.2 mm and the ground colour is pale ochre yellow but with broad, sometimes entirely confluent dark-brown transverse bands. The pattern elements consist of a dark basal area and sinuous, diffuse dark-brown transverse lines. The hindwing ground colour is pinkish red or rarely yellow with broad dark-brown marginal and costal band.

== Etymology ==
The generic name is derived from a combination of the words Patagonia and Phragmatobia and refers to the restricted distribution to the Chilean Andes of South America.
