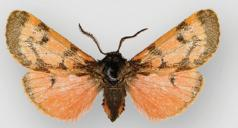

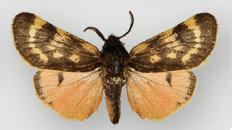

Scientific classification
- Kingdom: Animalia
- Phylum: Arthropoda
- Class: Insecta
- Order: Lepidoptera
- Superfamily: Noctuoidea
- Family: Erebidae
- Subfamily: Arctiinae
- Genus: Andesobia
- Species: A. sanguinea

Binomial name
- Andesobia sanguinea (Hampson, 1907)

Synonyms
- Turuptiana sanguinea Hampson, 1907; Phragmatobia sanguinea

= Andesobia sanguinea =

Species of moth

Andesobia sanguinea is a species of moth of the subfamily Arctiinae first described by George Hampson in 1907. It is found in the Lake Titicaca region of Peru and Bolivia.

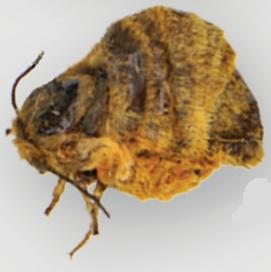
Female

It is the only member of the Andesobia with red colouration, prevalent on the hindwing and often the forewing, the latter varying from whitish pink to whitish tan. Females are micropterous (small winged) and are similar to Andesobia jelskii, but with a more yellowish colour.
