= Andesobia flavata =

Scientific classification
- Kingdom: Animalia
- Phylum: Arthropoda
- Class: Insecta
- Order: Lepidoptera
- Superfamily: Noctuoidea
- Family: Erebidae
- Subfamily: Arctiinae
- Genus: Andesobia
- Species: A. flavata

Binomial name
- Andesobia flavata (Hampson, 1901)

Synonyms
- Maenas flavata Hampson, 1901; Phragmatobia flavata

Species of moth

Andesobia flavata is a species of moth of the subfamily Arctiinae. It is found in Peru. Only very few specimens are known, and it is closely related to or conspecific with Andesobia boliviana. Externally, the holotype of A. flavata differs from A. boliviana only in having a slightly broader and more diffuse forewing marginal band, suggestive of minor intraspecific variation. However, the genitalic structure of the holotype reveals slight differences compared to A. flavata. Additional study material is needed to properly evaluate the status of these two taxa.
