= Orontobia taglangla =

Scientific classification
- Domain: Eukaryota
- Kingdom: Animalia
- Phylum: Arthropoda
- Class: Insecta
- Order: Lepidoptera
- Superfamily: Noctuoidea
- Family: Erebidae
- Subfamily: Arctiinae
- Genus: Orontobia
- Species: O. taglangla

Binomial name
- Orontobia taglangla de Freina, 1997

Species of moth

Orontobia taglangla is a moth of the family Erebidae. It was described by Josef J. de Freina in 1997. It is found in western Tibet.
