= Bucaea simplex =

Scientific classification
- Kingdom: Animalia
- Phylum: Arthropoda
- Class: Insecta
- Order: Lepidoptera
- Superfamily: Noctuoidea
- Family: Erebidae
- Subfamily: Arctiinae
- Genus: Bucaea
- Species: B. simplex

Binomial name
- Bucaea simplex (Walker, [1865] 1864)

Synonyms
- Savara simplex Walker, 1865

Species of moth

Bucaea simplex is a moth of the family Erebidae. It was described by Francis Walker in 1864 or 1865. It is found in southern India (Khandalla, northern Kanara).

The wings are yellow, but the forewings are darker and brighter than the hindwings.
