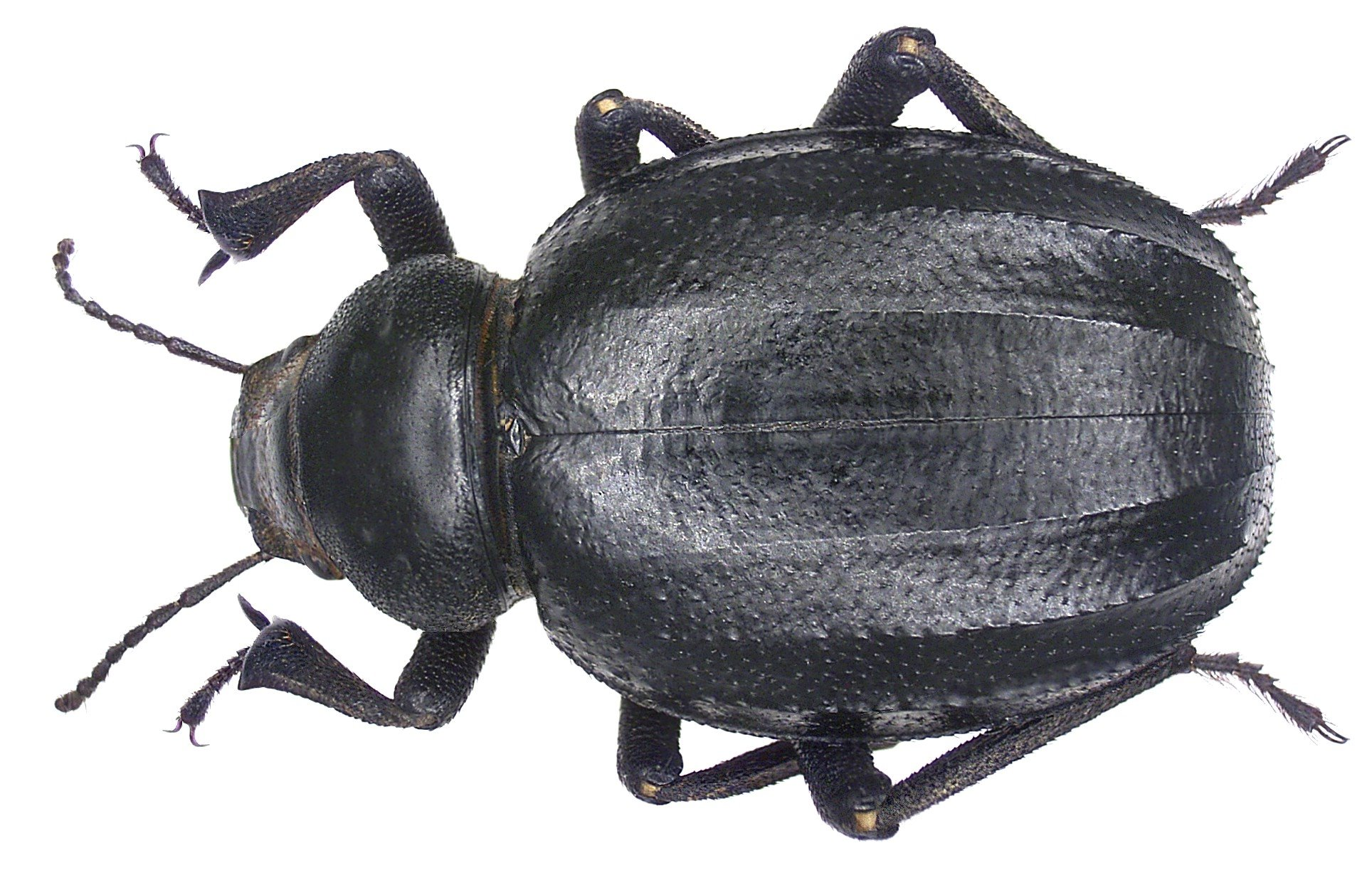
- Pimelia obsoleta

Scientific classification
- Domain: Eukaryota
- Kingdom: Animalia
- Phylum: Arthropoda
- Class: Insecta
- Order: Coleoptera
- Suborder: Polyphaga
- Infraorder: Cucujiformia
- Family: Tenebrionidae
- Subfamily: Pimeliinae
- Tribe: Pimeliini
- Genus: Pimelia; Fabricius, 1775

= Pimelia =

Genus of beetles

Pimelia is a genus of darkling beetles in the subfamily Pimeliinae.

== Species ==
- Pimelia aculeata Klug, 1830
- Pimelia akbesiana Fairmaire, 1884
- Pimelia angulata Fabricius, 1775
- Pimelia angusticollis Solier, 1836
- Pimelia arabica Klug, 1830
- Pimelia arenacea Solier, 1836
- Pimelia ascendens Wollaston, 1864
- Pimelia baetica Solier, 1836
- Pimelia bajula Klug, 1830
- Pimelia barmerensis Kulzer, 1956
- Pimelia bipunctata Fabricius, 1781
- Pimelia boyeri Solier, 1836
- Pimelia brevicollis Solier, 1836
- Pimelia canariensis Brullé, 1838
- Pimelia capito Krynicky, 1832
- Pimelia cephalotes (Pallas, 1781)
- Pimelia costata Waltl, 1835
- Pimelia cribra Solier, 1836
- Pimelia elevata Sénac, 1887
- Pimelia estevezi Oromí, 1990
- Pimelia fairmairei Kraatz, 1865
- Pimelia fernandezlopezi Machado, 1979
- Pimelia fornicata Herbst, 1799
- Pimelia goryi Solier, 1836
- Pimelia graeca Brullé, 1832
- Pimelia grandis Klug, 1830
- Pimelia granulata Solier, 1836
- Pimelia granulicollis Wollaston, 1864
- Pimelia grossa Fabricius, 1792
- Pimelia incerta Solier, 1836
- Pimelia indica Sénac, 1882
- Pimelia integra Rosenhauer, 1856
- Pimelia interjecta Solier, 1836
- Pimelia laevigata Brullé, 1838
- Pimelia lutaria Brullé, 1838
- Pimelia maura Solier, 1836
- Pimelia minos Lucas, 1853
- Pimelia modesta Herbst, 1799
- Pimelia monticola Rosenh., 1856
- Pimelia nazarena Miller, 1861
- Pimelia orientalis Senac, 1886
- Pimelia payraudi Latreille, 1829
- Pimelia perezi Sénac, 1887
- Pimelia punctata Solier, 1836
- Pimelia radula Solier, 1836
- Pimelia repleta Reitter, 1915
- Pimelia rotundata Solier, 1836
- Pimelia rotundipennis Kraatz, 1865
- Pimelia rugosa Fabricius, 1792
- Pimelia rugulosa Germar, 1824
- Pimelia ruida Solier, 1836
- Pimelia scabrosa Solier, 1836
- Pimelia sericea Olivier, 1795
- Pimelia simplex Solier, 1836
- Pimelia sparsa Brullé, 1838
- Pimelia subglobosa (Pallas, 1781)
- Pimelia testudo Kraatz, 1885
- Pimelia undulata Solier, 1836
- Pimelia variolosa Solier, 1836
- Pimelia ventricosa Falderm., 1837
- Pimelia verruculifera Soliér, 1836
- Pimelia villanovae Sénac, 1887

== Reproduction ==
Pimelia are univoltine, with one generation per year. Species in North Africa emerge in January to begin mating, synchronously with floral bloom. Normally Pimelia are detrivores, but during mating season they may cannibalize other adults, larvae, and eggs. This behavior may be due to need for extra nutrients or simply to eliminate competitors. Following behavior and mating take place on the slip face of a sand dune. After mating, the female digs a shallow hole and deposits a single egg, which closely resembles a grain of white rice. As the temperature rises above 50 °C the adult population dies off. Immature stages remain below the surface until maturity. During the winter the adults emerge.

== Desert adaptations ==
Many Pimelia species are conspicuous as they cross sand dunes. Locomotion in this difficult terrain is facilitated by numerous tarsal setae that allow for rapid tumbling behavior.

Adaptations to arid climates and desert environments allow Pimelia to survive and reproduce in the dunes, but the relative importance of abiotic and biotic factors in this respect is not clear. Environmental factors influencing these adaptations are extremes of temperature and humidity, excessive radiant energy, low and irregular rainfall, long periods of drought, strong winds, unstable sand substrates, and sparse, specialized vegetation.

Several morphological adaptations allow Pimelia to survive in the desert, including the lipid layers of the epicuticle, fused sclerites, the subelytral cavity, and the texture of the body surface. Much of the success of tenebrionid beetles in desert habitats is due to the development of impermeable cuticles. The fused sclerites of desert tenebrionids minimize water loss, but they result in flightlessness. The main barrier to the outward flow of water through insect integument is the lipid layer of the epicuticle. In many terrestrial arthropods, the temperature affects the permeability of the cuticle. There is a sudden increase in the rate of transpiration at what is known as the transition temperature. This may coincide with a physical change, perhaps the disorientation of the lipid molecules in the epicuticle. In tenebrionid beetles, the spiracles open into a humid subelytral cavity rather than directly to the atmosphere, thus reducing water loss. Water retention by intact elytral covers is greater at 0% relative humidity than at 97%. The size of the cavity is not important. Transpiration increases if the elytra are removed, emphasizing the importance of the epicuticle and subelytral cavity. Pimelia have tubercles on the surface of their elytra which scatter and reflect incident energy.

Burrowing is probably the most important behavior modification for heat regulation in Pimelia, because it permits access to a broad range of ambient temperatures. Pimelia are diurnal, emerging in early morning and late evening but remaining under the sand during the hot hours of the day.

== Gallery ==
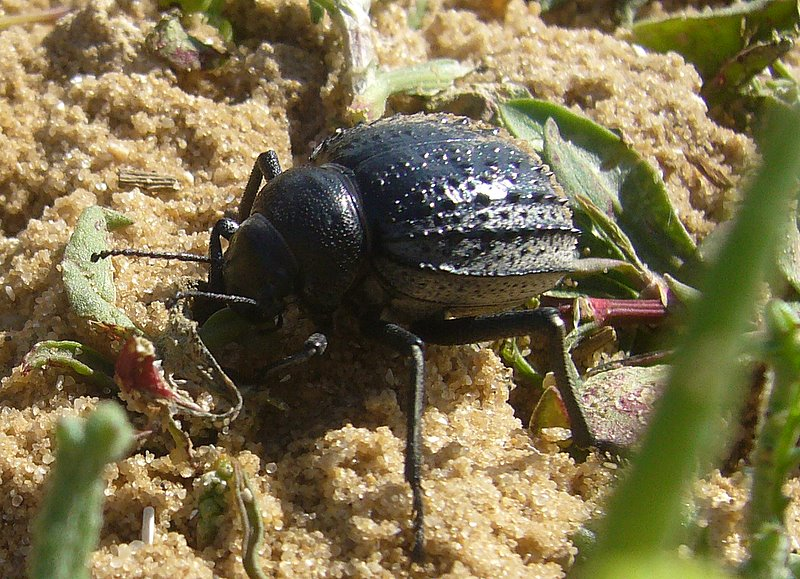
Pimelia angulata

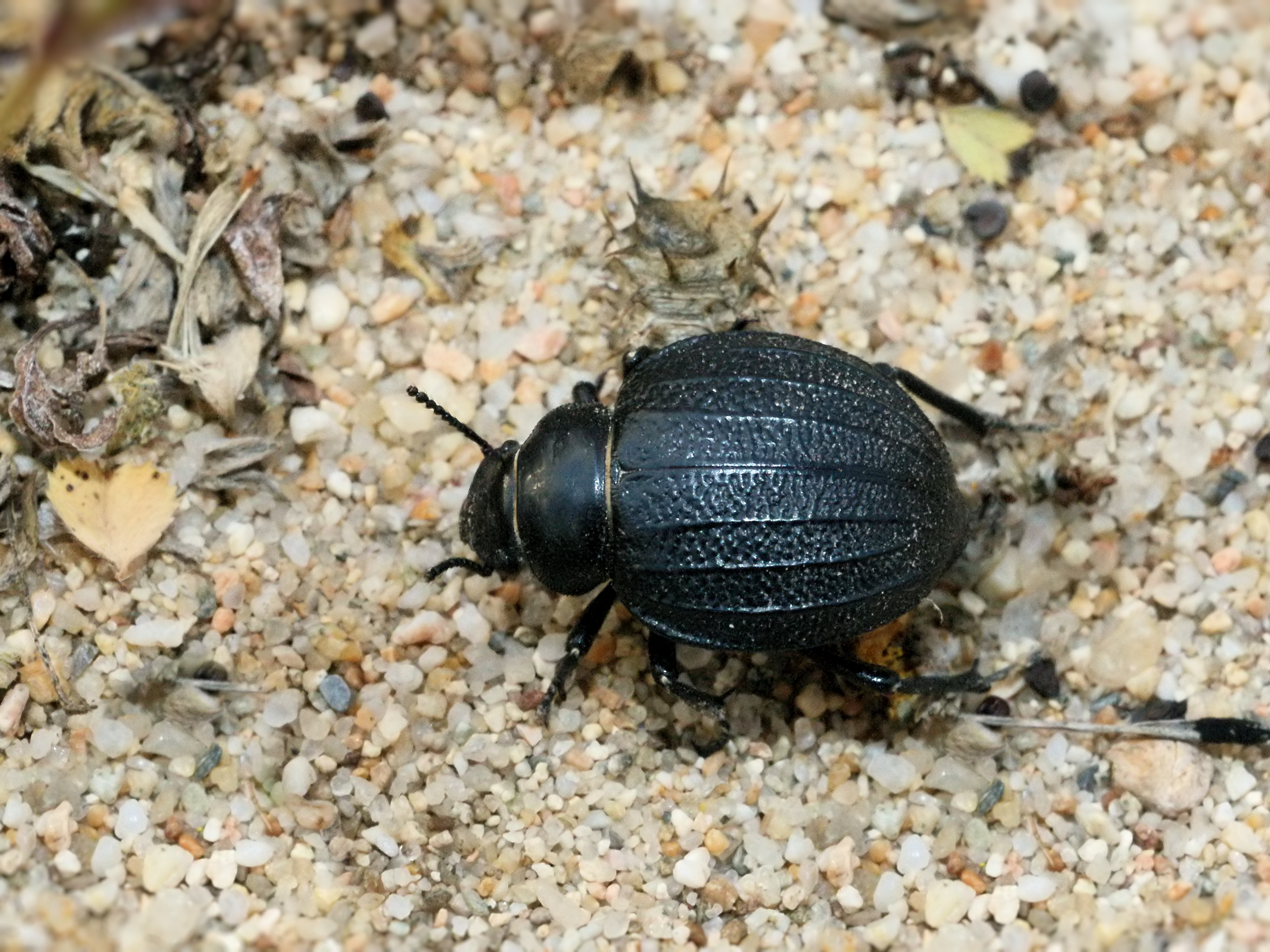
Pimelia bipunctata

Pimelia bipunctata on dune near beach

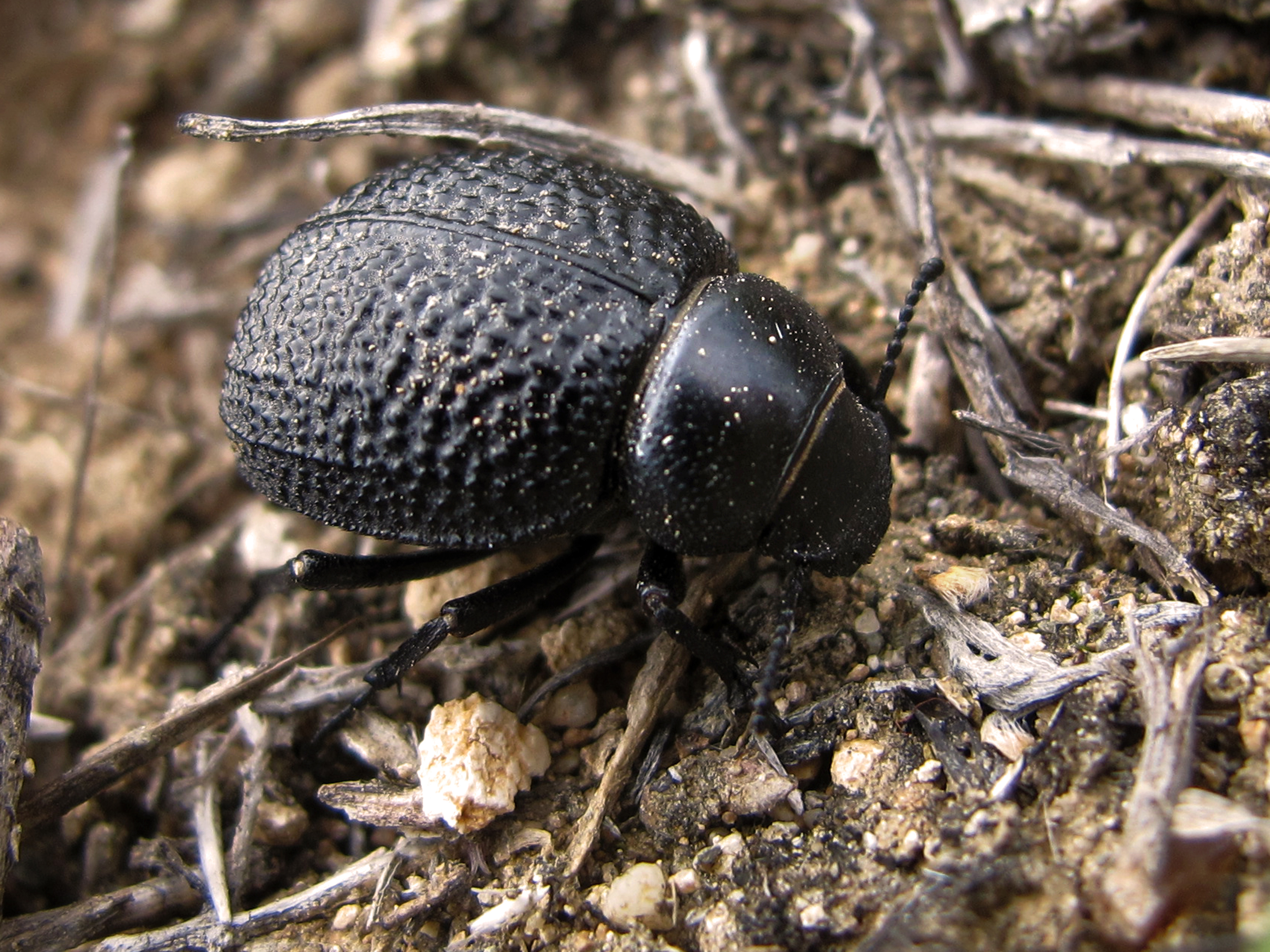
Pimelia punctata

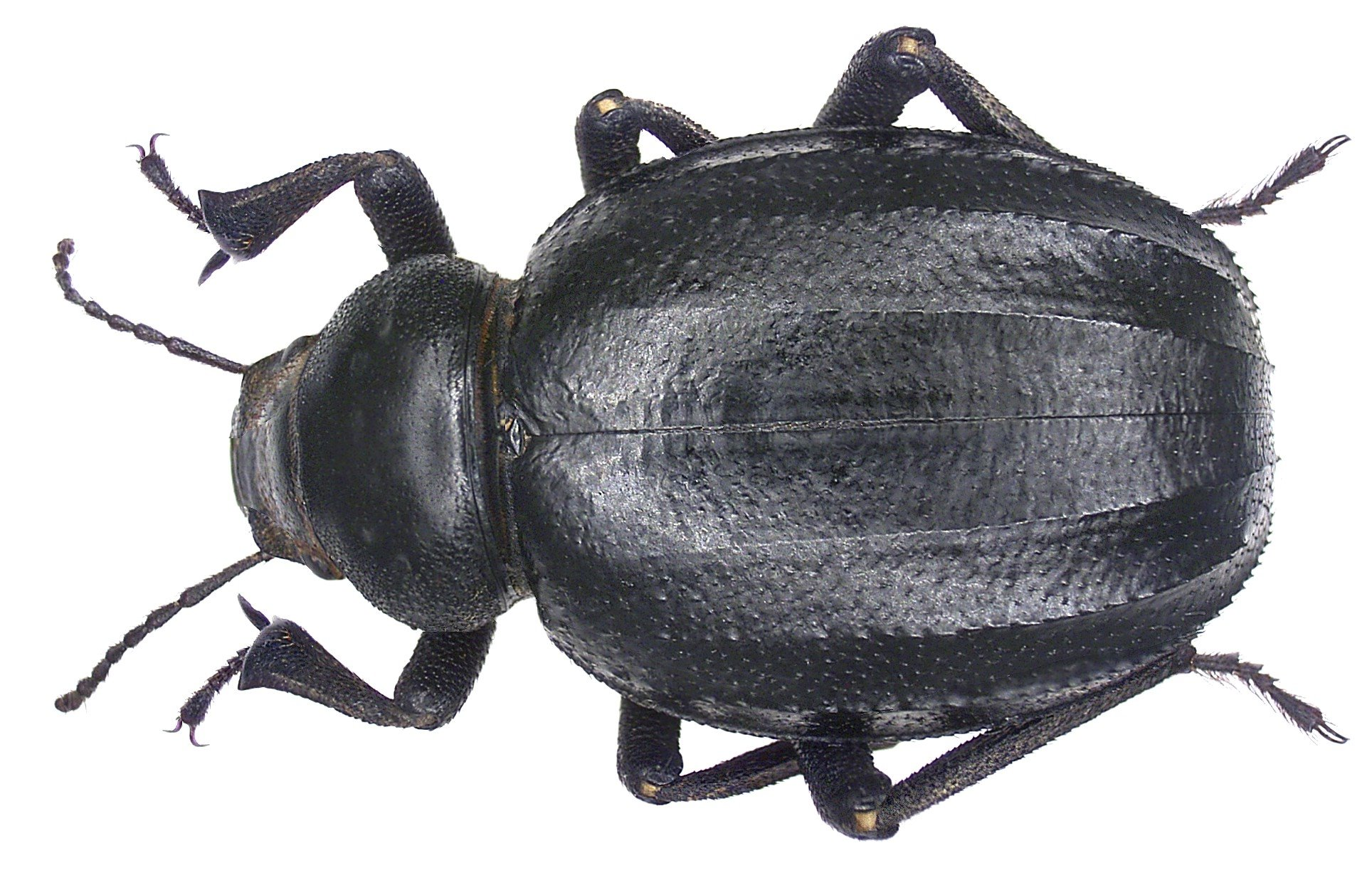
Pimelia (Piesterotarsa) obsoleta

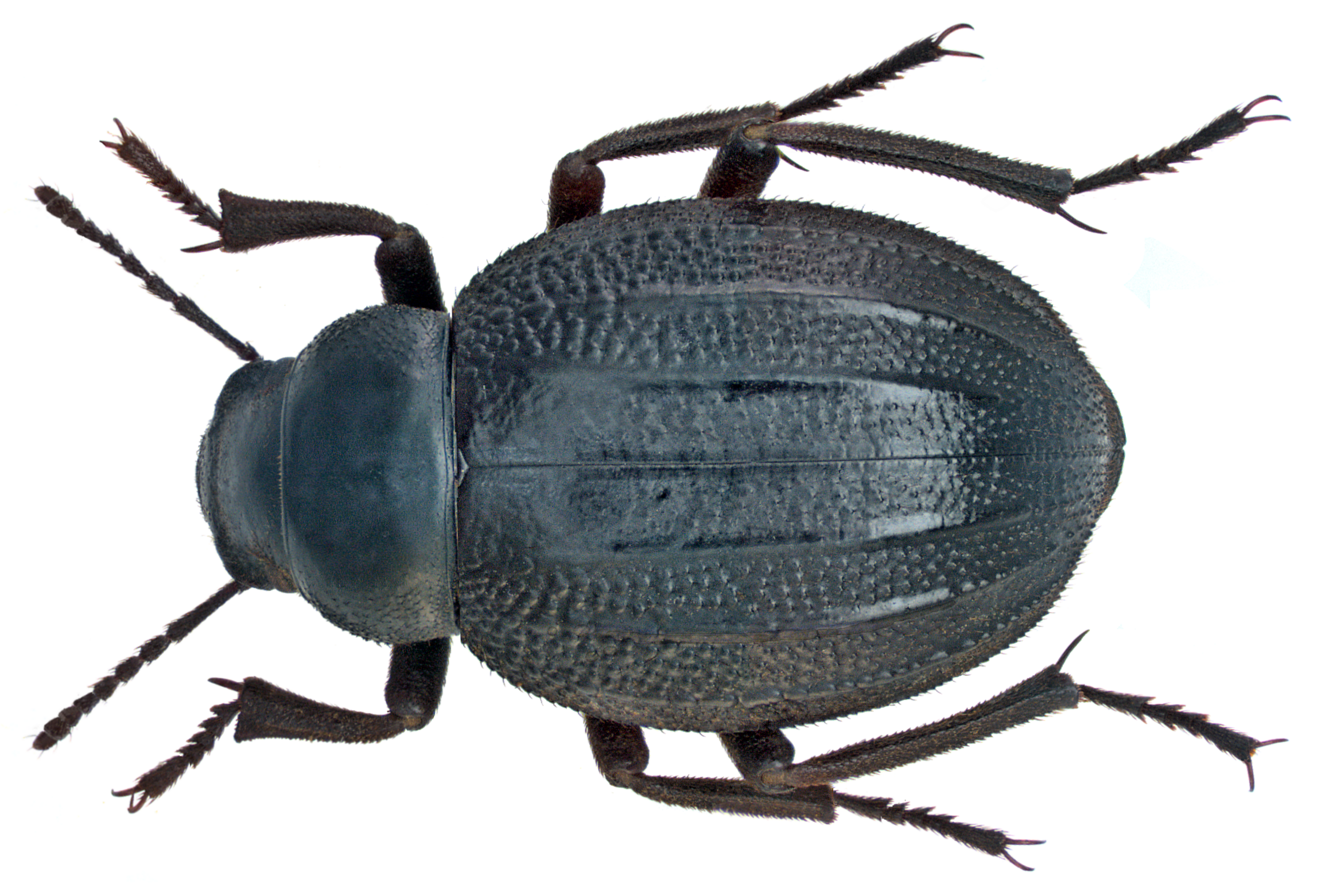
Pimelia ascendens

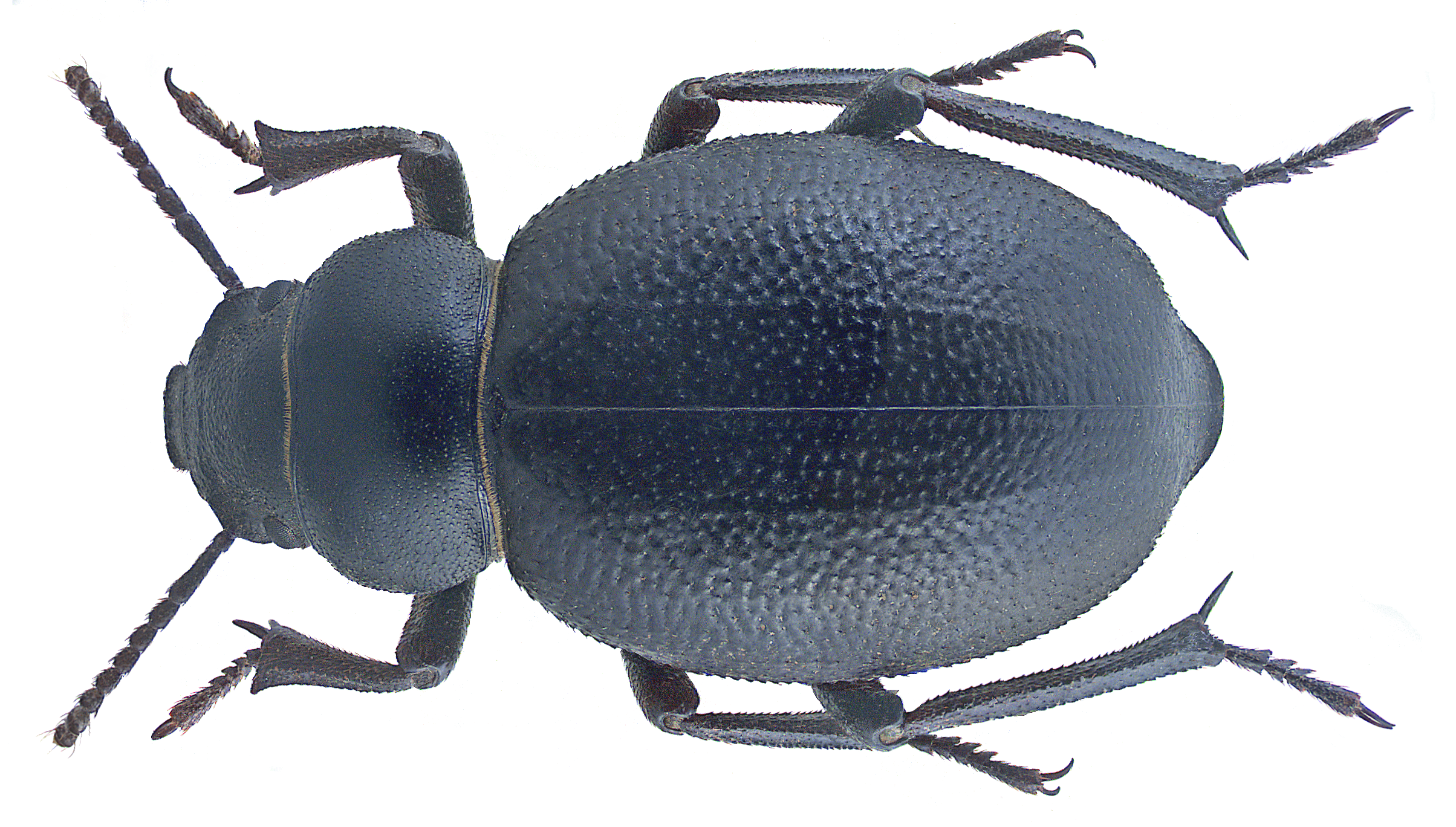
Pimelia baluja

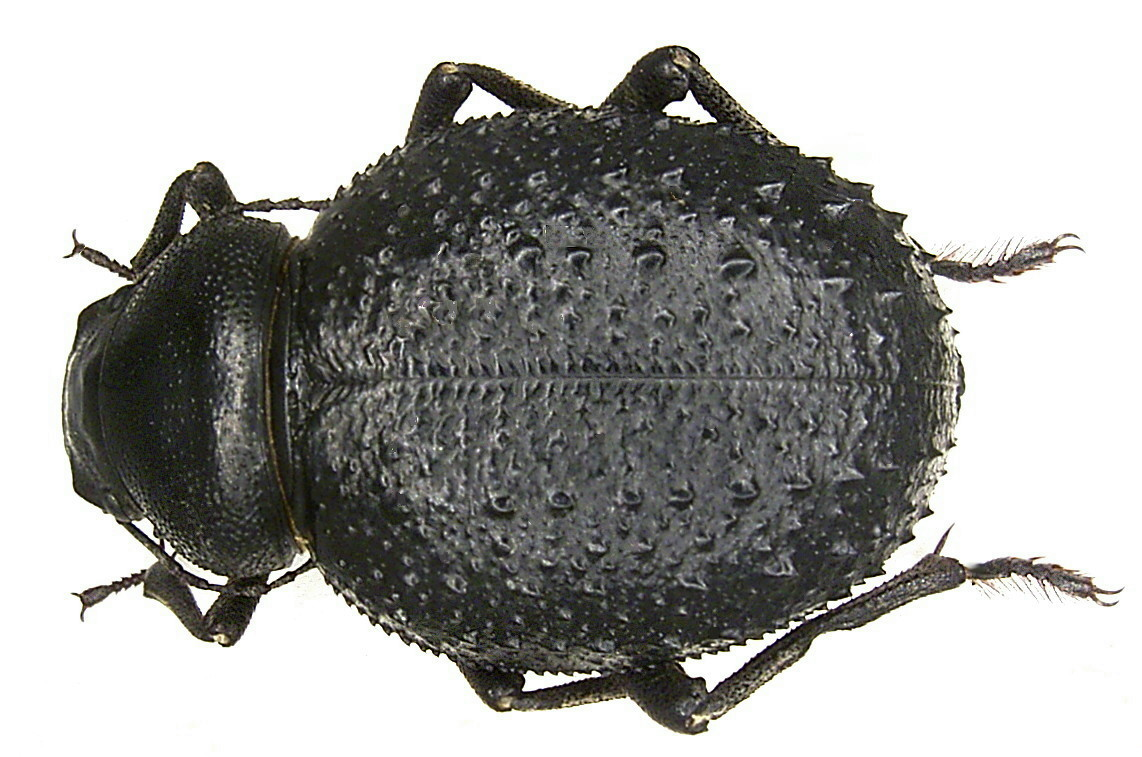
Pimelia confusa

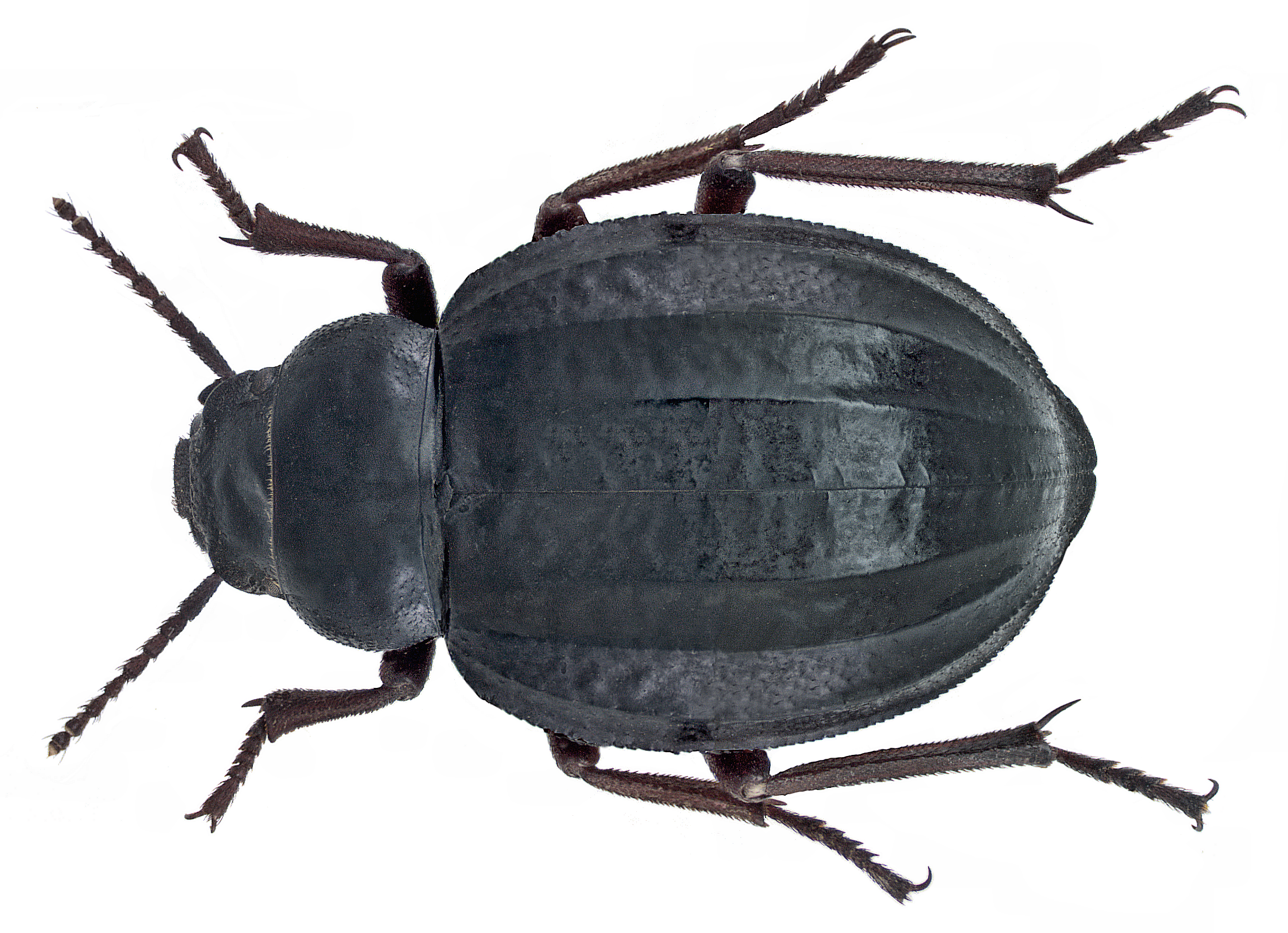
Pimelia laevigata

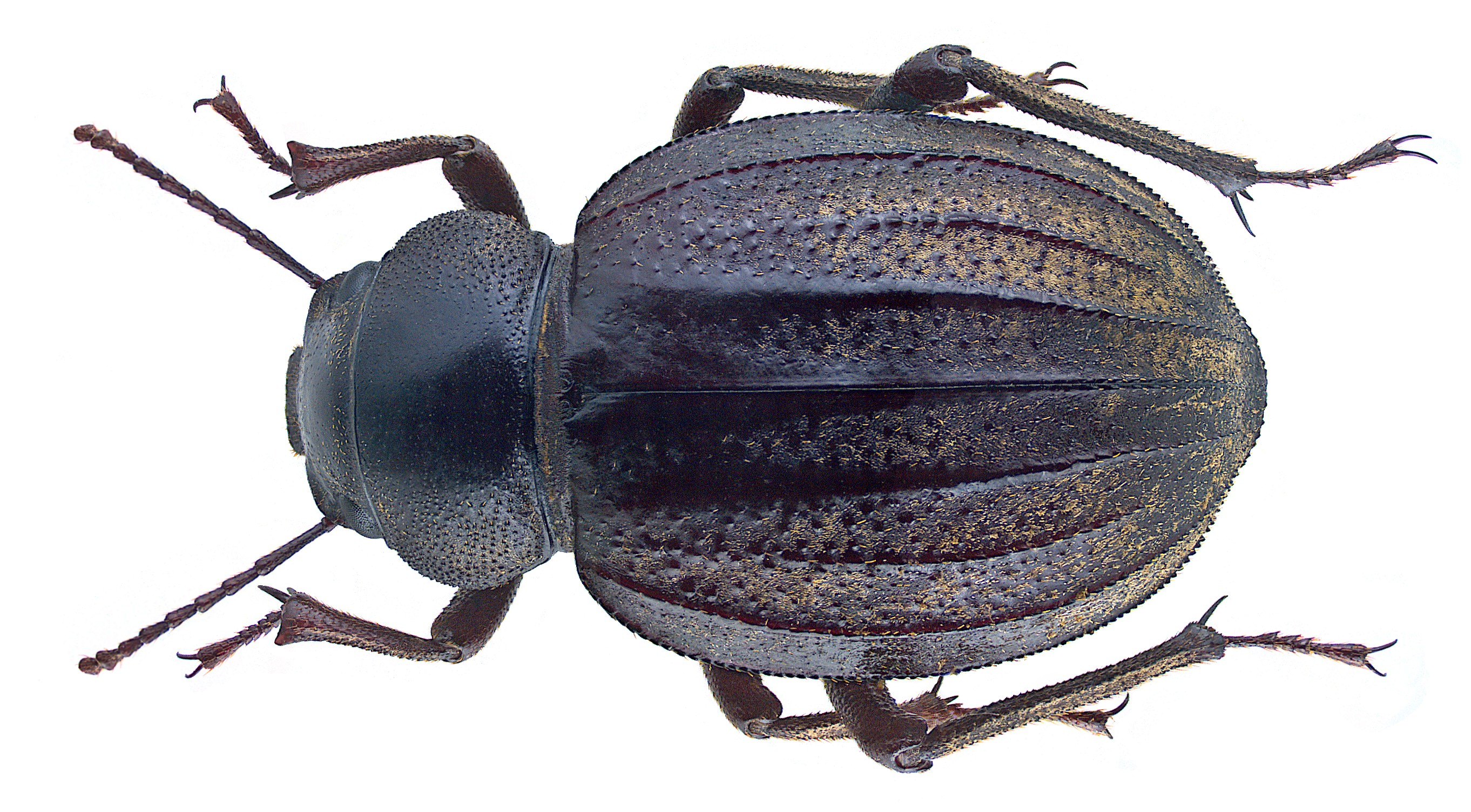
Pimelia senegalensis

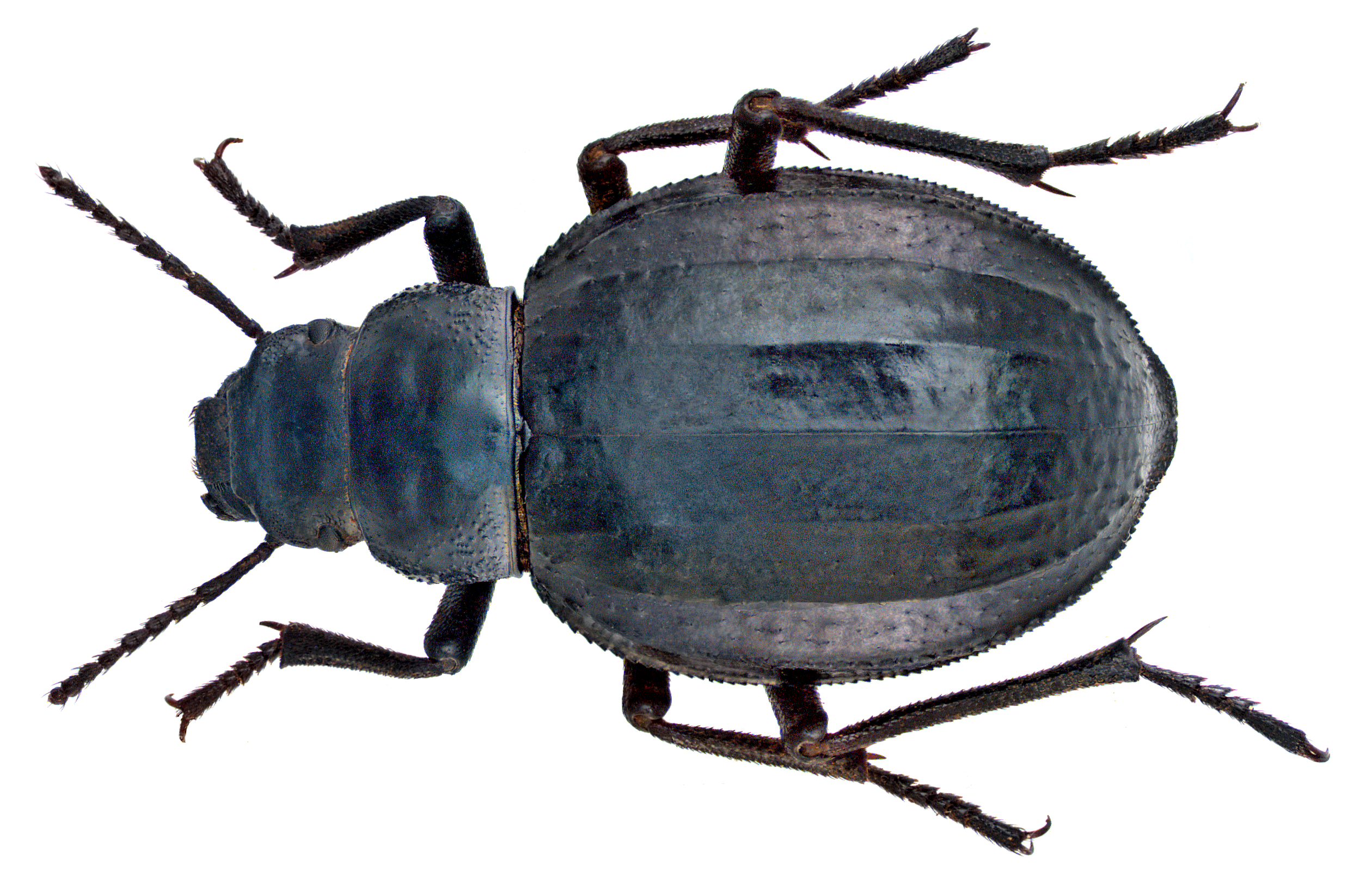
Pimelia sparsa

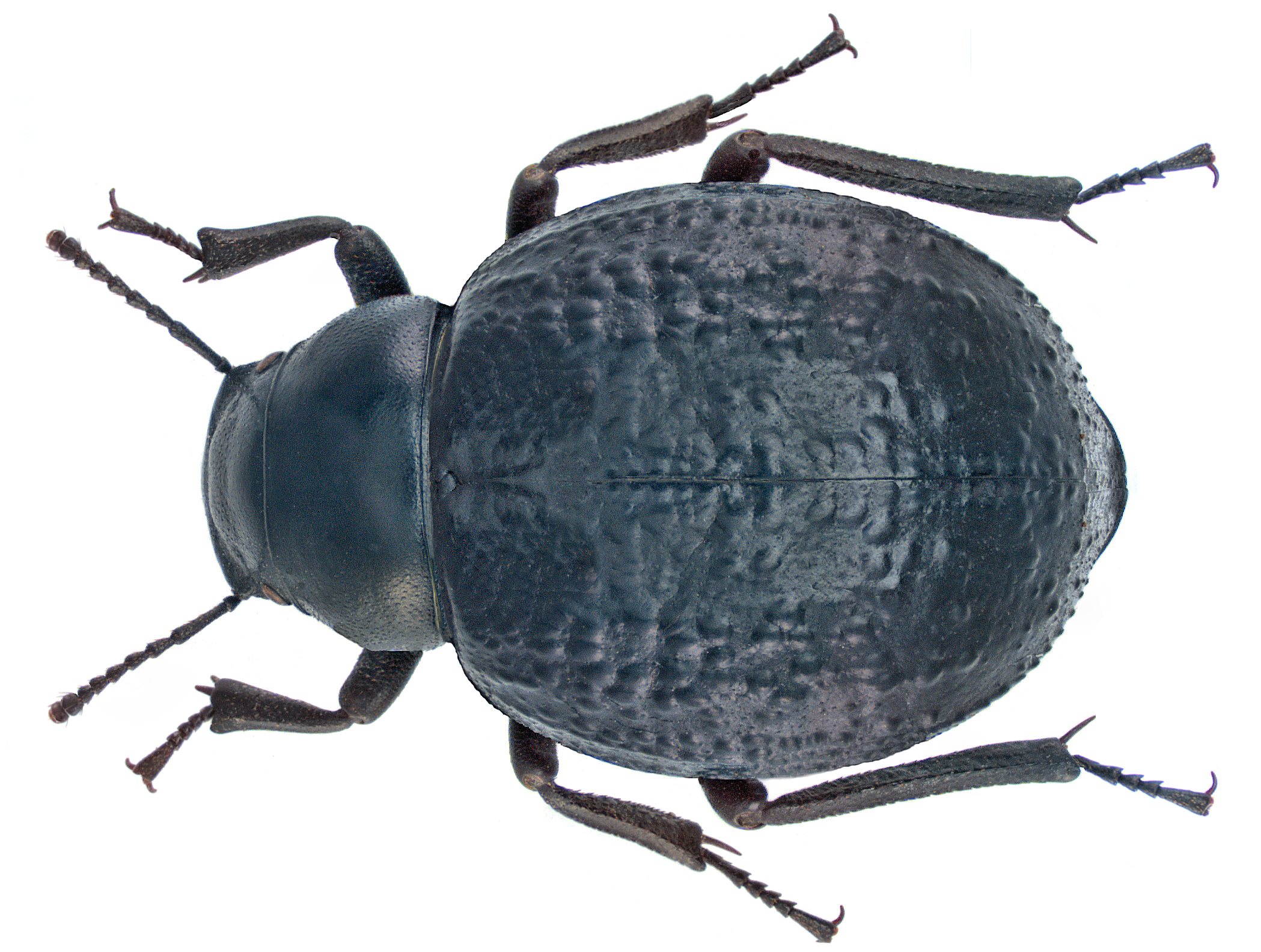
Pimelia subglobosa
