= Daucus lopadusanus =

Scientific classification
- Kingdom: Plantae
- Clade: Tracheophytes
- Clade: Angiosperms
- Clade: Eudicots
- Clade: Asterids
- Order: Apiales
- Family: Apiaceae
- Genus: Daucus
- Species: D. lopadusanus

Binomial name
- Daucus lopadusanus Tineo

Species of plant

Daucus lopadusanus is a species of plant in the family Apiaceae.

== Habitat and Distribution ==
Daucus lopadusanus grows mainly in the Mediterranean region, particularly on the island of Lampedusa, south of Sicily. It is found in coastal areas, especially on rocky limestone plateaus and in dry, exposed habitats with thin or sandy soil. The plant is adapted to the warm and dry conditions of the Mediterranean and can grow in small patches of soil between rocks. It is also associated with coastal garigue vegetation.

== Morphological Characteristics ==
Daucus lopadusanus is a small plant belonging to the family Apiaceae. It is generally low-growing and can be prostrate or slightly upright, usually reaching around 20 centimetres in height. It has finely divided green leaves and small white flowers arranged in umbrella-shaped clusters known as umbels. Its overall appearance is similar to that of other plants in the Daucus genus, including the wild carrot, although it is notably smaller and adapted to dry, rocky coastal environments.
