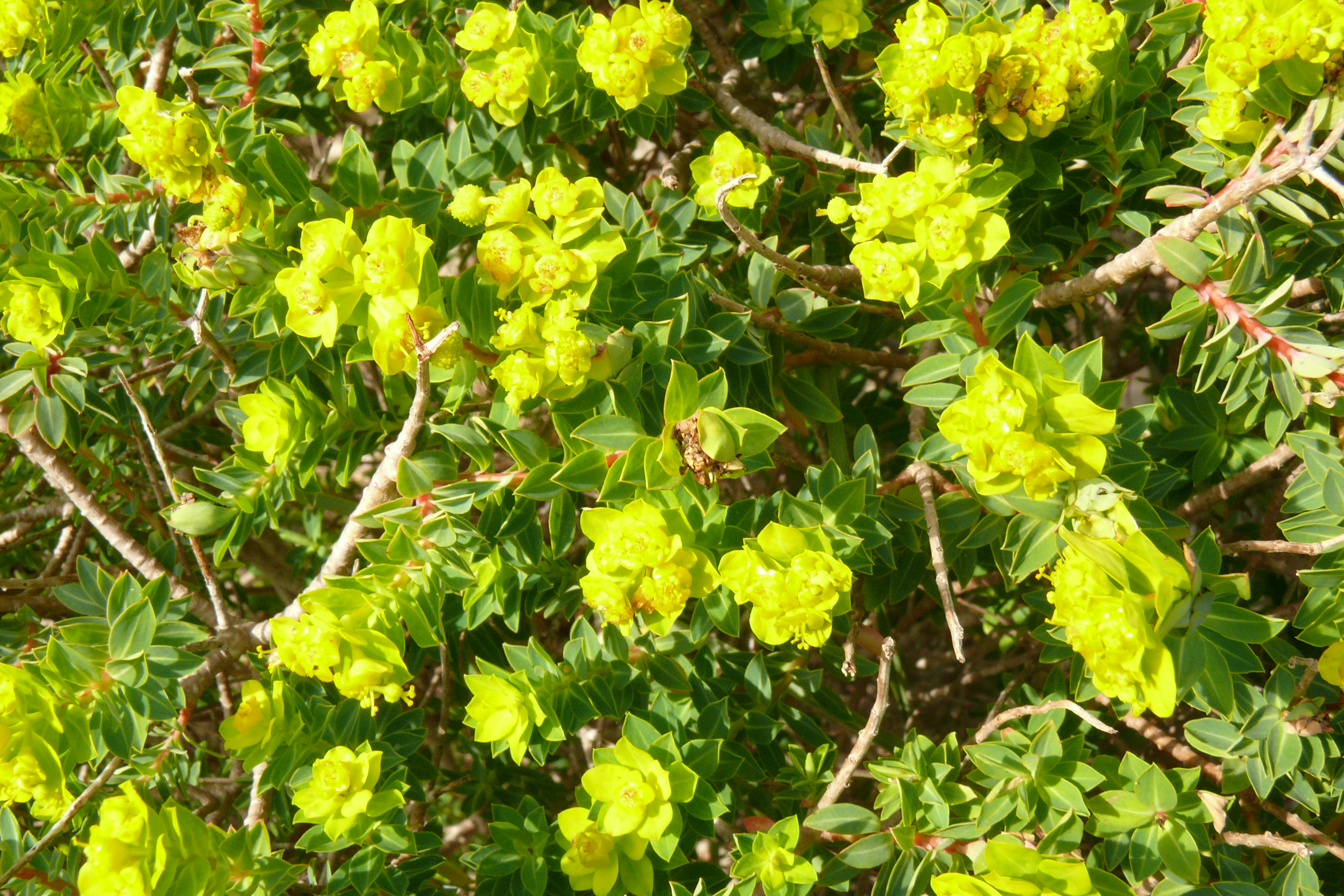

Scientific classification
- Kingdom: Plantae
- Clade: Tracheophytes
- Clade: Angiosperms
- Clade: Eudicots
- Clade: Rosids
- Order: Malpighiales
- Family: Euphorbiaceae
- Genus: Euphorbia
- Species: E. melitensis

Binomial name
- Euphorbia melitensis Parl.

= Euphorbia melitensis =

Species of plant

Euphorbia melitensis is a species of plant in the family Euphorbiaceae. It is endemic to Malta.
