= Sonorarctia fervida =

Scientific classification
- Kingdom: Animalia
- Phylum: Arthropoda
- Class: Insecta
- Order: Lepidoptera
- Superfamily: Noctuoidea
- Family: Erebidae
- Subfamily: Arctiinae
- Genus: Sonorarctia
- Species: S. fervida

Binomial name
- Sonorarctia fervida (Walker, 1855)

Synonyms
- Arctia fervida Walker, 1855; Heraclea commixta Butler, 1877; Arctia rodriguezi Druce, 1890; Heraclia fervida Godman & Salvin, 1885; Phragmatobia fervida Hampson, 1901

Species of moth

Sonorarctia fervida is a moth in the family Erebidae. It was described by Francis Walker in 1855. It is found in Guatemala.
