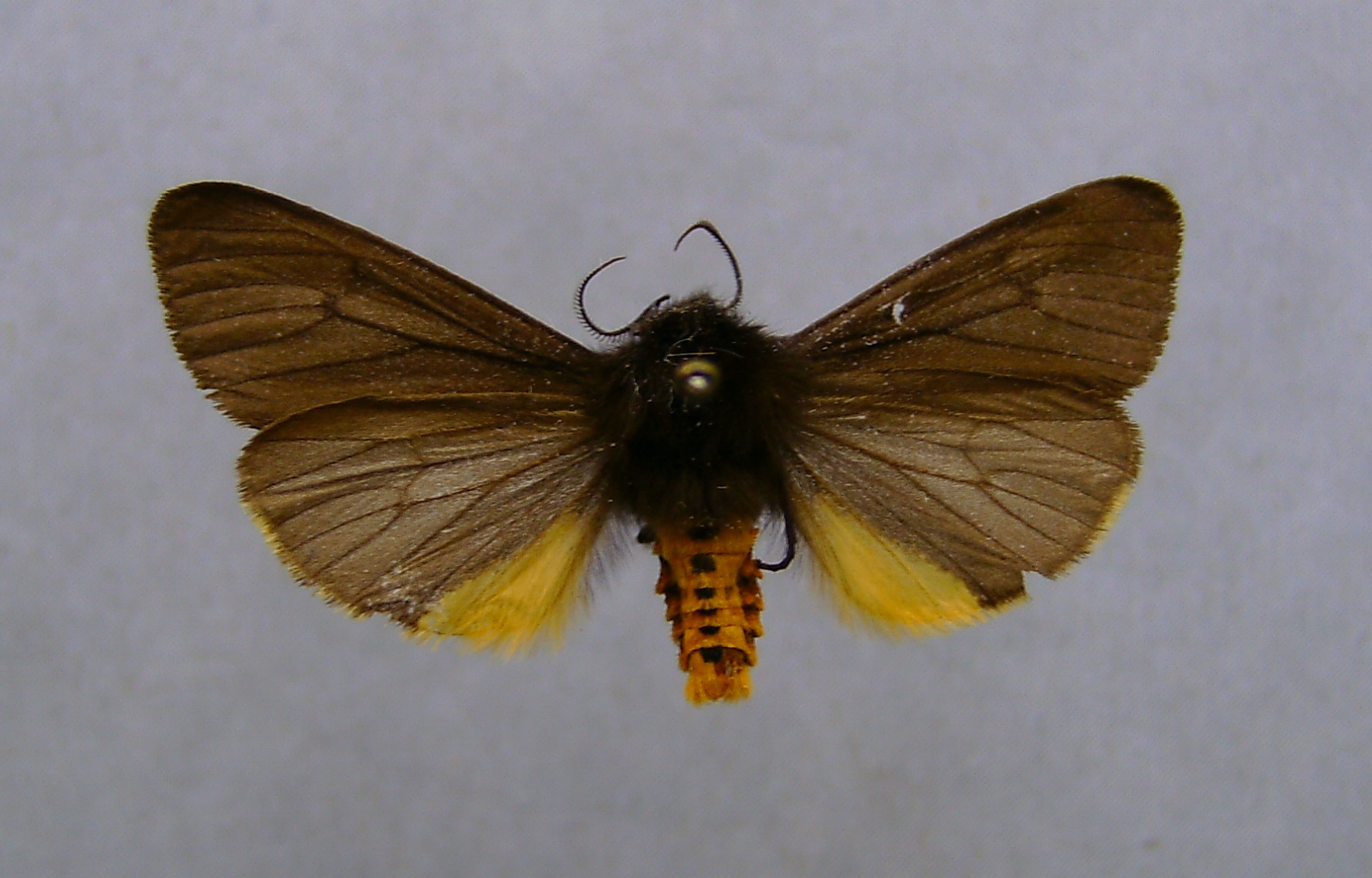

Scientific classification
- Domain: Eukaryota
- Kingdom: Animalia
- Phylum: Arthropoda
- Class: Insecta
- Order: Lepidoptera
- Superfamily: Noctuoidea
- Family: Erebidae
- Subfamily: Arctiinae
- Genus: Epatolmis; Butler, 1877
- Species: E. caesarea

Binomial name
- Epatolmis caesarea (Denis & Schiffermüller, 1775)

Synonyms
- Phalaena caesarea; Bombyx luctifera; Phalaena luctifera; Atolmis japonica; Estigmene moerens; Phragmatobia luctifera; Diacrisia caesarea

= Epatolmis =

Genus of moths

Epatolmis is a monotypic genus of tiger moths in the family Erebidae erected by Arthur Gardiner Butler in 1877. Its single species, Epatolmis caesarea, was first described by Michael Denis and Ignaz Schiffermüller in 1775. It is found in Europe, Asia Minor, southern Siberia, Amur, Mongolia, northern China up to Korea and Japan.

The wingspan is 35–40 mm.

The caterpillars feed on various plants, including Rubus, Atriplex, Cynoglossum, Plantago, Veronica, Stellaria, Galium, Hieracium and Euphorbia species.
