= Bucaea fumipennis =

Scientific classification
- Kingdom: Animalia
- Phylum: Arthropoda
- Class: Insecta
- Order: Lepidoptera
- Superfamily: Noctuoidea
- Family: Erebidae
- Subfamily: Arctiinae
- Genus: Bucaea
- Species: B. fumipennis

Binomial name
- Bucaea fumipennis (Hampson, 1891)

Synonyms
- Phragmatobia fumipennis Hampson, 1891; Tamilarctia fumipennis

Species of moth

Bucaea fumipennis is a moth of the family Erebidae. It was described by George Hampson in 1891. It is found in the Nilgiri Mountains of India.

The males have grey wings, while the forewings of the females are dark yellow and the hindwings are yellowish grey.
