= Senecio pygmaeus =

Scientific classification
- Kingdom: Plantae
- Clade: Tracheophytes
- Clade: Angiosperms
- Clade: Eudicots
- Clade: Asterids
- Order: Asterales
- Family: Asteraceae
- Genus: Senecio
- Species: S. pygmaeus

Binomial name
- Senecio pygmaeus Bercht. & J.Presl

Species of plant

Senecio pygmaeus, the pygmy ragwort, is a species of plant in the Asteraceae family. It is sub-endemic to Malta, it also found in Sicily, Lampedusa, Pantelleria, and other islands.
