= Orontobia coelestina =

Scientific classification
- Domain: Eukaryota
- Kingdom: Animalia
- Phylum: Arthropoda
- Class: Insecta
- Order: Lepidoptera
- Superfamily: Noctuoidea
- Family: Erebidae
- Subfamily: Arctiinae
- Genus: Orontobia
- Species: O. coelestina

Binomial name
- Orontobia coelestina (Püngeler, 1904)

Synonyms
- Phragmatobia coelestina Püngeler, 1904

Species of moth

Orontobia coelestina is a moth of the family Erebidae. It was described by Rudolf Püngeler in 1904. It is found in the Chinese provinces of Xinjiang and Qinghai.
