= Pseudophragmatobia =

Scientific classification
- Domain: Eukaryota
- Kingdom: Animalia
- Phylum: Arthropoda
- Class: Insecta
- Order: Lepidoptera
- Superfamily: Noctuoidea
- Family: Erebidae
- Subfamily: Arctiinae
- Subtribe: Spilosomina
- Genus: Pseudophragmatobia; Krüger, 2009

Type species
- Arctia parvula Felder, 1874

Genus of moths

Pseudophragmatobia is a genus of moths in the family Erebidae from South Africa.

== Species ==
- Pseudophragmatobia cinnamomea Krüger, 2009
- Pseudophragmatobia limbata Krüger, 2009
- Pseudophragmatobia salmo Krüger, 2009
- Pseudophragmatobia parvula (Felder, 1874)
- Pseudophragmatobia paucirubra Krüger, 2009
- Pseudophragmatobia perpunctata Krüger, 2009
- Pseudophragmatobia unicolor Krüger, 2009
