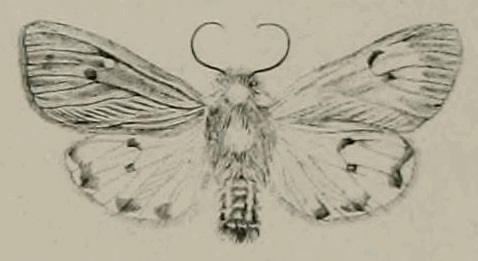

Scientific classification
- Domain: Eukaryota
- Kingdom: Animalia
- Phylum: Arthropoda
- Class: Insecta
- Order: Lepidoptera
- Superfamily: Noctuoidea
- Family: Erebidae
- Subfamily: Arctiinae
- Genus: Phragmatobia
- Species: P. placida

Binomial name
- Phragmatobia placida (Frivaldszky, 1835)

Synonyms
- Euprepia placida Frivaldszky, 1835

= Phragmatobia placida =

Species of moth

Phragmatobia placida is a moth in the family Erebidae. It was described by Imre Frivaldszky in 1835. It is found in Albania, Bosnia and Herzegovina, Bulgaria, North Macedonia, Greece, Ukraine, Asia Minor and the Near East.

The wingspan is about 41 mm.

The larvae feed on Plantago and Taraxacum species.

== Subspecies ==
- Phragmatobia placida placida
- Phragmatobia placida mirzayansi Dubatolov & Zahiri, 2005
- Phragmatobia placida unipuncta Amsel, 1935
