= Sonorarctia nundar =

Scientific classification
- Domain: Eukaryota
- Kingdom: Animalia
- Phylum: Arthropoda
- Class: Insecta
- Order: Lepidoptera
- Superfamily: Noctuoidea
- Family: Erebidae
- Subfamily: Arctiinae
- Genus: Sonorarctia
- Species: S. nundar

Binomial name
- Sonorarctia nundar (Dyar, 1907)

Synonyms
- Phragmatobia nundar Dyar, 1907

Species of moth

Sonorarctia nundar is a moth in the family Erebidae. It was described by Harrison Gray Dyar Jr. in 1907. It is found in Mexico.
