= Pimelia rugulosa =

Scientific classification
- Kingdom: Animalia
- Phylum: Arthropoda
- Class: Insecta
- Order: Coleoptera
- Suborder: Polyphaga
- Infraorder: Cucujiformia
- Family: Tenebrionidae
- Genus: Pimelia
- Species: P. rugulosa

Binomial name
- Pimelia rugulosa Germar, 1824

Species of beetle

Pimelia rugulosa is a species of darkling beetle. It is found in southern Italy (including Sicily) and Malta.
