= Bucaea =

Scientific classification
- Kingdom: Animalia
- Phylum: Arthropoda
- Class: Insecta
- Order: Lepidoptera
- Superfamily: Noctuoidea
- Family: Erebidae
- Subfamily: Arctiinae
- Subtribe: Spilosomina
- Genus: Bucaea; Walker, 1866

Type species
- Savara simplex Walker, [1865] 1864

Synonyms
- Savara Walker, [1865] 1864; Tamilarctia Dubatolov et Kishida, 2005

Genus of moths

Bucaea is a genus of tiger moths in the family Erebidae. The moths in the genus are found in Hindustan.

== Species ==
- Bucaea fumipennis (Hampson, 1891)
- Bucaea simplex (Walker, [1865] 1864)
