= Phragmatobia amurensis =

Scientific classification
- Domain: Eukaryota
- Kingdom: Animalia
- Phylum: Arthropoda
- Class: Insecta
- Order: Lepidoptera
- Superfamily: Noctuoidea
- Family: Erebidae
- Subfamily: Arctiinae
- Genus: Phragmatobia
- Species: P. amurensis

Binomial name
- Phragmatobia amurensis Seitz, 1910

Synonyms
- Phragmatobia fuliginosa japonica Rothschild, 1910; Phragmatobia fuliginosa chosensis Bryk, 1948

Species of moth

Phragmatobia amurensis is a moth in the family Erebidae. It was described by Seitz in 1910. It is found in the Russian Far East (Middle Amur, Primorye, southern Sakhalin, southern Kuril Islands), China (Dunbei, Hebe), Korea and Japan.

== Subspecies ==
- Phragmatobia amurensis amurensis
- Phragmatobia amurensis japonica Rothschild, 1910 (southern Sakhalin, southern Kuril Islands, Japan)
