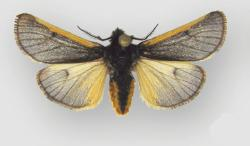
- Male
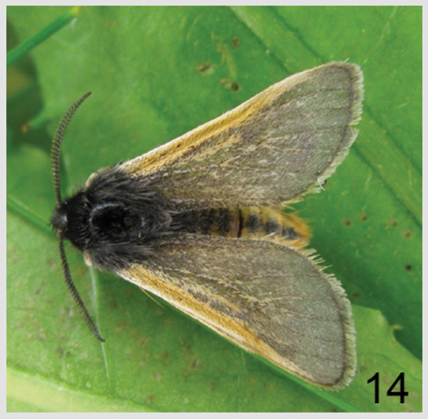
- Living male

Scientific classification
- Domain: Eukaryota
- Kingdom: Animalia
- Phylum: Arthropoda
- Class: Insecta
- Order: Lepidoptera
- Superfamily: Noctuoidea
- Family: Erebidae
- Subfamily: Arctiinae
- Genus: Andesobia
- Species: A. jelskii

Binomial name
- Andesobia jelskii (Oberthür, 1881)

Synonyms
- Arctia jelskii Oberthür, 1881; Phragmatobia jelskii; Mallocephala imitatrix Rothschild, 1922; Mallocephala imitatrix ab. griseola Rothschild, 1922; Mallocephala imitatrix ab. luteola Rothschild, 1922

= Andesobia jelskii =

Species of moth

Andesobia jelskii is a species of moth of the subfamily Arctiinae first described by Charles Oberthür in 1881. It is found in the Department of Junín in Peru.

== Adult ==
The forewings of the males have a length of 8–12 mm. The ground colour is brownish grey with a yellowish-ochre costal band varying to entirely dark brownish grey or pale ochre grey. There is an indistinct black discal spot, but other markings are obsolete. The hindwing ground colour is yellowish ochre with a broad, diffusely bordered grey-brown marginal band over the distal third of the wing, varying to entirely dark brownish grey. The forewings and hindwings of the females are micropterous (vestigial-winged) and highly reduced.

== Egg ==
The egg is almost spherical, with the poles only very weakly flattened. It is ivory white changing to dark greyish white prior to hatching.

== Larva ==
First-instar larvae are initially translucent white, becoming opaque white. The second instar integument is black and the third instar has jet-black setae. The verrucae of the fourth instar are more pronounced than in previous instar. When mature, female larvae are about twice as large as male larvae.

== Pupa ==
The cocoon is spherical to ovoid, reddish brown to dull brown, consisting of a single, thin and flimsy layer with incorporated larval setae.

== Biology ==
First-instar larvae initially feed on the tissue of the dead or dying female, then leave the cocoon in search of plant material. Duration of the first instar is six days, second instar five to six days. The larvae are probably polyphagous and have been reared on Taraxacum and Poa species. The larvae emit an unpleasant odour of decay when disturbed. The cocoons are spun between leaves of the food plants near the ground. Adults emerge in the morning, with relatively fast expansion of the wings. Females remain in the loosely spun cocoon, and presumably emit mating pheromones from within the thin cocoon soon after emerging from the pupa, because males dig through the loose silk webbing to enter and mate inside the cocoon. The pair remains in copula for several hours, after which the male leaves the cocoon, and the female deposits about 50 eggs inside the cocoon.

Males are diurnal and fly rapidly during sunny periods. The flight period is early in the year (January), in the middle of the four-month wet season.

== Gallery ==
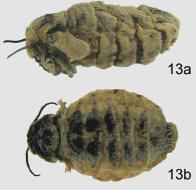
Female: lateral aspect (13a) and dorsal aspect (13b)

Female pupa

Mature larva

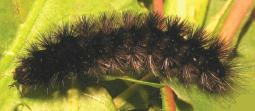
Dark form of mature larva

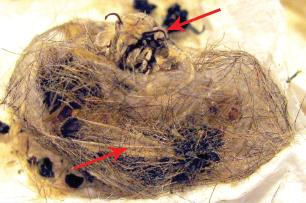
Male (lower arrow) and female (upper arrow) in copulo inside cocoon of female
