= Pseudophragmatobia parvula =

Scientific classification
- Domain: Eukaryota
- Kingdom: Animalia
- Phylum: Arthropoda
- Class: Insecta
- Order: Lepidoptera
- Superfamily: Noctuoidea
- Family: Erebidae
- Subfamily: Arctiinae
- Genus: Pseudophragmatobia
- Species: P. parvula

Binomial name
- Pseudophragmatobia parvula (Felder, 1874)

Synonyms
- Arctia parvula Felder, 1874; Thanatarctia parvula; Phragmatobia parvula

Species of moth

Pseudophragmatobia parvula is a moth in the family Erebidae. It was described by Felder in 1874. It is found in South Africa.
