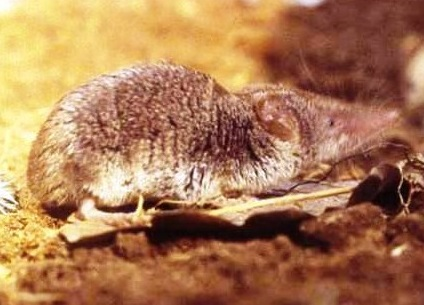

Conservation status
- Least Concern (IUCN 3.1)

Scientific classification
- Kingdom: Animalia
- Phylum: Chordata
- Class: Mammalia
- Order: Eulipotyphla
- Family: Soricidae
- Genus: Crocidura
- Species: C. sicula

Binomial name
- Crocidura sicula Miller, 1900
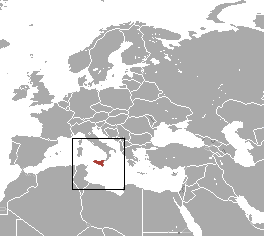
- Sicilian shrew range

= Sicilian shrew =

Species of mammal

The Sicilian shrew (Crocidura sicula) is a species of mammal in the family Soricidae. It is found in Sicily (Italy) and Gozo (Malta). Its natural habitat is temperate shrubland.

== Distribution and habitat ==
It is present in Sicily and Ustica (C. s. sicula), in the Egadi Islands (C. s. aegatensis) and in Gozo (C. s. calypso). It lives in open environments of gariga or Mediterranean scrub but also within lyce, cork and beech forest formations, from 0 to 1,800 m (0 to 5,906 ft) above sea level. Sometimes it is also present within citrus groves and cultivated areas as well as, rarely, in rural dwellings.

=== Subspecies ===
Four subspecies of the Sicilian shrew are found:

- Crocidura sicula sicula - on the island of Sicily
- Crocidura sicula aegatensis - on the Aegadian Islands
- Crocidura sicula calypso - on the island of Gozo
- Crocidura sicula esuae - a fossil form from the Middle Pleistocene of Sicily, larger than living individuals, though other authors have suggested that this represents an extinct species that was replaced by C. sicula.

== Maltese occurrence ==
The Maltese subspecies Crocidura sicula calypso is found on Gozo and has also been recorded on Comino, but is absent from mainland Malta. Known locally as il-ġurdien geddumu twil ta' Għawdex ("long-chinned shrew of Gozo"), it lives in scrub, garigue and farmland, is mainly nocturnal, and is protected under Maltese and EU law due to threats such as pesticides and predation by cats.

== See also ==
- Endemic Maltese wildlife
