= Orontobia =

Scientific classification
- Domain: Eukaryota
- Kingdom: Animalia
- Phylum: Arthropoda
- Class: Insecta
- Order: Lepidoptera
- Superfamily: Noctuoidea
- Family: Erebidae
- Subfamily: Arctiinae
- Subtribe: Arctiina
- Genus: Orontobia de Freina, 1997

Genus of moths

Orontobia is genus of tiger moths in the family Erebidae. The moths are found in the mountains of West China.

== Species ==
- Orontobia coelestina (Püngeler, 1904) - Provisional taxonomic position. No male known.
- Orontobia mooseri de Freina, 1997
- Orontobia murzini Dubatolov, 2005
- Orontobia secreta (Draudt, 1931) (=Orontobia dalailama kansuensis de Freina, 1997)
  - Orontobia secreta dalailama de Freina, 1997
- Orontobia taglangla de Freina, 1997
