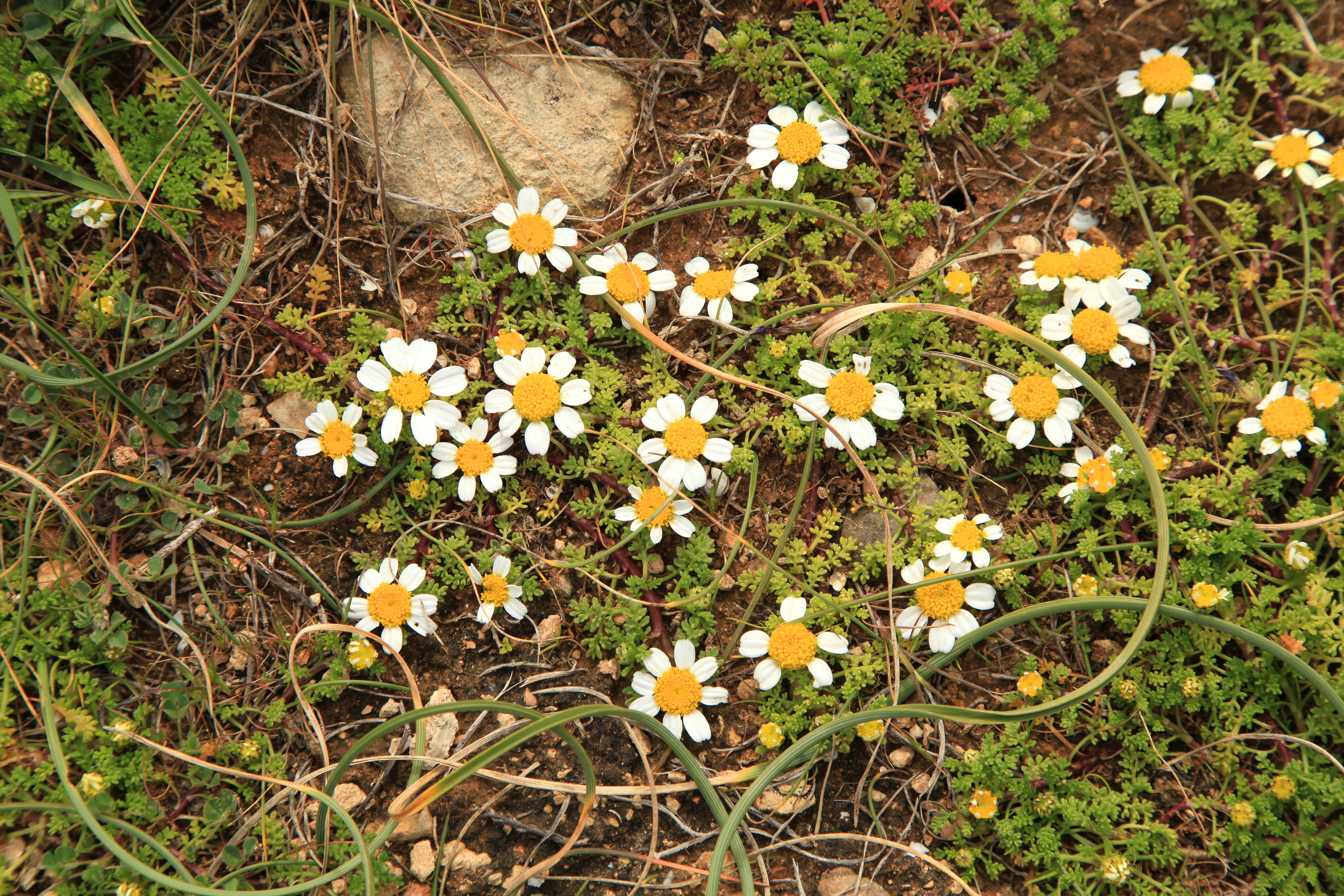

Scientific classification
- Kingdom: Plantae
- Clade: Tracheophytes
- Clade: Angiosperms
- Clade: Eudicots
- Clade: Asterids
- Order: Asterales
- Family: Asteraceae
- Genus: Anthemis
- Species: A. urvilleana

Binomial name
- Anthemis urvilleana (DC.) Sommier & Caruana

= Anthemis urvilleana =

Species of plant

Anthemis urvilleana is a plant species in the Asteraceae family.
