= Allanwatsonia =

Scientific classification
- Domain: Eukaryota
- Kingdom: Animalia
- Phylum: Arthropoda
- Class: Insecta
- Order: Lepidoptera
- Superfamily: Noctuoidea
- Family: Erebidae
- Subfamily: Arctiinae
- Genus: Allanwatsonia; Ferguson, 1985
- Species: A. hodeva

Binomial name
- Allanwatsonia hodeva (H. Druce, 1897)

Synonyms
- Hoplarctia hodeva Schaus, 1894; Hoplarctia hodewa flava C. Hoffmann, 1936; Hoplarctia confluens C. Hoffmann, 1936; Hoplarctia lugubris C. Hoffmann, 1936; Pericallia postalalis Strand, 1919

Genus of moths

Allanwatsonia is a monotypic tiger moth genus in the family Erebidae erected by Douglas C. Ferguson in 1985. Its only species, Allanwatsonia hodeva, was first described by Herbert Druce in 1897. It is found in Mexico.
