= Sonorarctia =

Scientific classification
- Domain: Eukaryota
- Kingdom: Animalia
- Phylum: Arthropoda
- Class: Insecta
- Order: Lepidoptera
- Superfamily: Noctuoidea
- Family: Erebidae
- Subfamily: Arctiinae
- Tribe: Arctiini
- Subtribe: Arctiina
- Genus: Sonorarctia; Ferguson, 1985

Genus of moths

Sonorarctia is a genus of tiger moths in the family Erebidae.

== Species ==
- Sonorarctia fervida (Walker, 1855)
- Sonorarctia nundar (Dyar, 1907)
