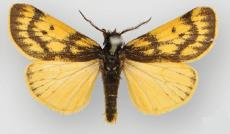

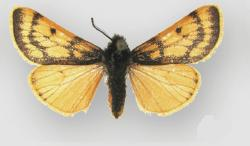

Scientific classification
- Domain: Eukaryota
- Kingdom: Animalia
- Phylum: Arthropoda
- Class: Insecta
- Order: Lepidoptera
- Superfamily: Noctuoidea
- Family: Erebidae
- Subfamily: Arctiinae
- Genus: Andesobia
- Species: A. boliviana

Binomial name
- Andesobia boliviana (Gaede, 1923)

Synonyms
- Estigmene boliviana Gaede, 1923; Phragmatobia boliviana; Turuptiana flavescens Rothschild, 1933

= Andesobia boliviana =

Species of moth

Andesobia boliviana is a species of moth of the subfamily Arctiinae first described by Max Gaede in 1923. It is found in Peru and Bolivia.
