= List of Alleculinae genera =

These genera belong to the subfamily Alleculinae, comb-clawed beetles.

== Alleculinae genera ==
- Aeanes Champion, 1893 (the Neotropics)
- Alethia Champion, 1888 (North America and the Neotropics)
- Allecula Fabricius, 1801 (the Neotropics, the Palearctic, tropical Africa, and Indomalaya)
- Alogista Fåhraeus, 1870 (tropical Africa)
- Alogistopsis Borchmann, 1943 (tropical Africa)
- Amaropsis Champion, 1893 (the Neotropics)
- Amorphopoda Fåhraeus, 1870 (tropical Africa)
- Anamphidora Casey, 1924 (North America)
- Andrimus Casey, 1891 (North America)
- Androchirus Leconte, 1862 (North America)
- Anognathena Ando, 2017 (Indomalaya)
- Anthracula Fairmaire, 1897 (Indomalaya)
- Apalmia Fairmaire, 1896 (Indomalaya)
- Aptericula Borchmann, 1937 (tropical Africa)
- Asiomira Dubrovina, 1973 (the Palearctic)
- Asticostena Fairmaire, 1897 (Indomalaya)
- Atoichus Carter, 1915 (Australasia)
- Balassogloa Semenov, 1891 (the Palearctic)
- Bancocistela Pic, 1947 (tropical Africa)
- Barbora Novák, 2020 (Indomalaya)
- Barycistela Blackburn, 1891 (Australasia)
- Bearnicistela Pic, 1909 (Indomalaya)
- Blepusa Westwood, 1842 (the Neotropics)
- Bobina Novák, 2015 (the Palearctic and Indomalaya)
- Bobisthes Novák, 2019 (Indomalaya)
- Bolbostetha Fairmaire, 1896 (Indomalaya)
- Borbochara Novák, 2009 (Indomalaya)
- Borbonalia Novák, 2014 (the Palearctic and Indomalaya)
- Borborella Novák, 2020 (Indomalaya)
- Borboresthes Fairmaire, 1897 (the Palearctic and Indomalaya)
- Borchmannius Bousquet & Bouchard, 2015 (tropical Africa)
- Borneocistela Pic, 1922 (Indomalaya)
- Brachycula Fairmaire, 1906 (tropical Africa)
- Bratyna Westwood, 1875 (tropical Africa)
- Buxela Fairmaire, 1894 (Indomalaya)
- Capnochroa LeConte, 1862 (North America)
- Caulostena Fairmaire, 1896 (tropical Africa)
- Charisius Champion, 1888 (the Neotropics)
- Chitwania Novák, 2015 (Indomalaya)
- Chromatia LeConte, 1862 (North America)
- Cistelampra Fairmaire, 1897 (tropical Africa)
- Cistelina Seidlitz, 1896 (the Palearctic and Indomalaya)
- Cistelodema Borchmann, 1932 (Indomalaya)
- Cisteloida Fairmaire, 1882 (Indomalaya)
- Cistelomorpha Redtenbacher, 1868 (the Palearctic and Indomalaya)
- Cistelopsis Fairmaire, 1896 (the Palearctic and Indomalaya)
- Cnecosochara Reitter, 1913 (the Palearctic)
- Compsocula Fairmaire, 1898 (tropical Africa)
- Copistethus Seidlitz, 1890 (the Palearctic)
- Cornucistela Campbell, 1980 (the Palearctic)
- Costallecula Pic, 1954 (tropical Africa)
- Cryptomysia Pic, 1954 (tropical Africa)
- Cteisa Solier, 1835 (the Neotropics)
- Cteisodella Novák, 2020 (Indomalaya)
- Cteisodes Borchmann, 1932 (Indomalaya)
- Cteniopinus Seidlitz, 1896 (the Palearctic and Indomalaya)
- Cteniopus Solier, 1835 (the Palearctic)
- Cylindrothorus Solier, 1843 (tropical Africa)
- Dasytoxystropus Pic, 1921 (the Neotropics)
- Diastanus Fairmaire, 1902 (tropical Africa)
- Dimorphochilus Borchmann, 1908 (Australasia)
- Diopoenus Champion, 1888 (the Neotropics)
- Dioxycula Fairmaire, 1896 (Indomalaya)
- Doranalia Novák, 2020 (the Palearctic and Indomalaya)
- Dorota Novák, 2018 (Indomalaya)
- Ectatocera Fåhraeus, 1870 (tropical Africa)
- Ectenostoma Fåhraeus, 1870 (tropical Africa)
- Erxias Champion, 1888 (the Neotropics)
- Erzika Novák, 2020 (Indomalaya)
- Eubalia Laporte, 1840 (tropical Africa)
- Eucaliga Fairmaire & Germain, 1861 (the Neotropics)
- Euomma Boheman, 1858 (Australasia)
- Eutrapelodes Borchmann, 1929 (tropical Africa)
- Evaostetha Novák, 2008 (Indomalaya)
- Falsomophlus Pic, 1925 (Indomalaya)
- Falsopsilonycha Pic, 1930 (tropical Africa)
- Fifina Novák, 2018 (Indomalaya)
- Fifinoides Novák, 2020 (Indomalaya)
- Flabellalogista Pic, 1954 (tropical Africa)
- Gastrhaema Jacquelin du Val, 1863 (the Palearctic)
- Gerandryus Rottenberg, 1873 (the Palearctic)
- Gerdacula Novák, 2015 (Indomalaya)
- Gonodera Mulsant, 1856 (the Palearctic)
- Havanalia Novák, 2020 (the Palearctic)
- Heliomophlus Reitter, 1906 (the Palearctic)
- Heliostrhaema Reitter, 1890 (the Palearctic)
- Heliotaurus Mulsant, 1856 (the Palearctic and tropical Africa)
- Helopsallecula Pic, 1936 (tropical Africa)
- Helopsisomira Pic, 1952 (tropical Africa)
- Hemicistela Blackburn, 1891 (Australasia)
- Holdhausia Reitter, 1906 (the Palearctic)
- Homoropsis Fairmaire, 1886 (tropical Africa)
- Homotrysis Pascoe, 1866 (Australasia)
- Houaphanica Novák, 2020 (Indomalaya)
- Hovacula Fairmaire, 1898 (tropical Africa)
- Hymenalia Mulsant, 1856 (the Palearctic, tropical Africa, and Indomalaya)
- Hymenochara Campbell, 1978 (North America)
- Hymenorus Mulsant, 1852 (North America, the Neotropics, the Palearctic, and Indomalaya)
- Hypocistela Bates, 1879 (the Palearctic)
- Idatius Fairmaire, 1906 (tropical Africa)
- Impressallecula Pic, 1951 (tropical Africa)
- Indricula Novák, 2016 (Indomalaya)
- Isomira Mulsant, 1856 (North America, the Neotropics, the Palearctic, tropical Africa, and Indomalaya)
- Isomiropsis Borchmann, 1942 (tropical Africa)
- Jaklia Novák, 2010 (Indomalaya)
- Jophon Champion, 1895 (Australasia)
- Knausia Fall, 1931 (North America)
- Kombacula Novák, 2012 (Indomalaya)
- Kralia Novák, 2013 (the Palearctic)
- Ksukolcula Novák, 2017 (Indomalaya)
- Labetis C.O. Waterhouse, 1879 (Oceania)
- Lagriallecula Pic, 1920 (tropical Africa)
- Latacula Campbell, 1971 (the Neotropics)
- Lepturidea Fauvel, 1862 (Australasia)
- Liodocistela Pic, 1930 (Indomalaya)
- Litopous Matthews, 2012 (Australasia)
- Lobopoda Solier, 1835 (North America and the Neotropics)
- Loriculoides Novák, 2020 (Indomalaya)
- Lycula Campbell, 1976 (the Neotropics)
- Lystronychus Latreille, 1829 (North America and the Neotropics)
- Macrocistela Pic, 1941 (tropical Africa)
- Macrocistelopsis Pic, 1956 (Australasia)
- Madreallecula Kanda, 2013 (North America)
- Magdanalia Novák, 2020 (the Palearctic)
- Makicula Novák, 2012 (Indomalaya)
- Malaymira Novák, 2020 (Indomalaya)
- Matthewsotys Bouchard & Bousquet, 2021 (Australasia)
- Mayidicistela Pic, 1954 (tropical Africa)
- Megischia Solier, 1835 (the Palearctic)
- Megischina Reitter, 1906 (the Palearctic)
- Menes Champion, 1888 (the Neotropics)
- Menoeceus Champion, 1888 (North America and the Neotropics)
- Metistete Pascoe, 1866 (Australasia)
- Micrisomira Pic, 1930 (Indomalaya)
- Microamarygmus Pic, 1915 (Indomalaya)
- Microcistela Pic, 1904 (the Palearctic)
- Microcistelopsis Pic, 1922 (Australasia)
- Microprostenus Pic, 1921 (the Neotropics)
- Microstenogena Pic, 1924 (tropical Africa)
- Microsthes Novák, 2011 (Indomalaya)
- Mimocistela Borchmann, 1938 (tropical Africa)
- Mimopraogena Pic, 1952 (tropical Africa)
- Mycetochara Guérin-Méneville, 1827 (North America and the Palearctic)
- Mycetocharina Seidlitz, 1890 (the Palearctic)
- Mycetocula Novák, 2015 (Indomalaya)
- Narsodes Campbell, 1976 (the Neotropics)
- Neocistela Borchmann, 1909 (Australasia)
- Nesogenomorpha Pic, 1917 (tropical Africa)
- Nesotaurus Fairmaire, 1896 (tropical Africa)
- Netopha Fairmaire, 1893 (the Palearctic and Indomalaya)
- Nikomenalia Dubrovina, 1975 (the Palearctic and Indomalaya)
- Nocar Blackburn, 1891 (Australasia)
- Notacula Campbell, 1971 (the Neotropics)
- Notocistela Carter, 1915 (Australasia)
- Nypsius Champion, 1895 (Australasia)
- Obesacula Campbell, 1971 (the Neotropics)
- Omedes Broun, 1893 (Australasia)
- Ommatochara Borchmann, 1932 (Indomalaya)
- Ommatophorus W.J. MacLeay, 1872 (Australasia)
- Omocula Borchmann, 1937 (the Neotropics)
- Omolepta Fåhraeus, 1870 (tropical Africa)
- Omophlina Reitter, 1890 (the Palearctic)
- Omophlus Dejean, 1834 (the Palearctic)
- Onychomira Campbell, 1984 (North America)
- Oocistela Borchmann, 1908 (Australasia)
- Oracula Novák, 2019 (tropical Africa)
- Orchesiolobopoda Pic, 1919 (the Neotropics)
- Palpichara Borchmann, 1932 (Indomalaya)
- Palpicula Novák, 2018 (Indomalaya)
- Paracistela Borchmann, 1941 (the Palearctic and Indomalaya)
- Parahymenorus Campbell, 1971 (the Neotropics)
- Pemanoa Buck, 1955 (Australasia)
- Petria Semenov, 1894 (the Palearctic)
- Petrostetha Novák, 2008 (Indomalaya)
- Phediodes Campbell, 1976 (the Neotropics)
- Phedius Champion, 1888 (North America and the Neotropics)
- Piccula Bousquet & Bouchard, 2015 (tropical Africa)
- Pitholaus Champion, 1888 (the Neotropics)
- Pizura Novák, 2016 (Indomalaya)
- Platyallecula Blair, 1935 (tropical Africa)
- Podonta Solier, 1835 (the Palearctic)
- Podontinus Seidlitz, 1896 (the Palearctic)
- Polyidus Champion, 1888 (the Neotropics)
- Potocula Novák, 2012 (Indomalaya)
- Prionalia Novák, 2020 (the Palearctic)
- Prionychus Solier, 1835 (the Palearctic)
- Proctenius Reitter, 1890 (the Palearctic)
- Prostenus Klug, 1829 (the Neotropics)
- Pseudocistela Crotch, 1874 (worldwide)
- Pseudocistelopsis Novák, 2018 (Indomalaya)
- Pseudohymenalia Novák, 2008 (the Palearctic and Indomalaya)
- Pseudomorocaulus Pic, 1915 (tropical Africa)
- Psis Novák, 2019 (Indomalaya)
- Punctacula Campbell, 1971 (the Neotropics)
- Rhipidonyx Reitter, 1876 (Indomalaya)
- Scaletomerus Blackburn, 1891 (Australasia)
- Scaphinion Matthews, 2012 (Australasia)
- Scotobiopsis Brèthes, 1910 (the Neotropics)
- Seydelicistela Pic, 1954 (tropical Africa)
- Simarus Borchmann, 1909 (Australasia)
- Socotralia Novák, 2007 (tropical Africa)
- Spinecula Novák, 2019 (Indomalaya)
- Stenerophlina Reitter, 1906 (the Palearctic)
- Stenerula Fairmaire, 1875 (tropical Africa)
- Steneryx Reitter, 1890 (the Palearctic)
- Stenochidus Leconte, 1862 (North America)
- Stenogena Fairmaire, 1895 (tropical Africa)
- Stenogenomorpha Pic, 1919 (tropical Africa)
- Stilbocistela Borchmann, 1932 (Indomalaya)
- Strongyallecula Pic, 1955 (tropical Africa)
- Synallecula Kolbe, 1883 (tropical Africa)
- Tanychilus Newman, 1838 (Australasia)
- Taxes Champion, 1895 (Australasia)
- Telesicles Champion, 1888 (North America)
- Temnes Champion, 1888 (the Neotropics)
- Theatetes Champion, 1888 (the Neotropics)
- Tripolicryptus Strand, 1929 (the Palearctic)
- Tucumana Gebien, 1911 (the Neotropics)
- Upinella Mulsant, 1857 (the Palearctic and Indomalaya)
- Vietnalia Novák, 2021 (Indomalaya)
- Viriathus Fairmaire, 1902 (tropical Africa)
- Xylochus Broun, 1880 (Australasia)
- Xystropus Solier, 1835 (the Neotropics)
- Zizu Novák, 2019 (Indomalaya)
- Zomedes Watt, 1992 (Australasia)
- † Amberophlus Novák & Háva, 2019
- † Calcarocistela Nabozhenko, 2016
- † Jurallecula L.N. Medvedev, 1969
- † Mycetocharoides Schaufuss, 1889
- † Platycteniopus Chang, Nabozhenko, Pu, Xu, Jia, Li, 2016
- † Sinocistela Zhang, 1989
