= Cistelopsis =

Scientific classification
- Kingdom: Animalia
- Phylum: Arthropoda
- Class: Insecta
- Order: Coleoptera
- Suborder: Polyphaga
- Infraorder: Cucujiformia
- Family: Tenebrionidae
- Subfamily: Alleculinae
- Tribe: Alleculini
- Subtribe: Alleculina
- Genus: Cistelopsis; Fairmaire, 1896

Genus of beetles

Cistelopsis is a genus of comb-clawed beetles in the family Tenebrionidae. They are found in the Palearctic and Indomalaya.
