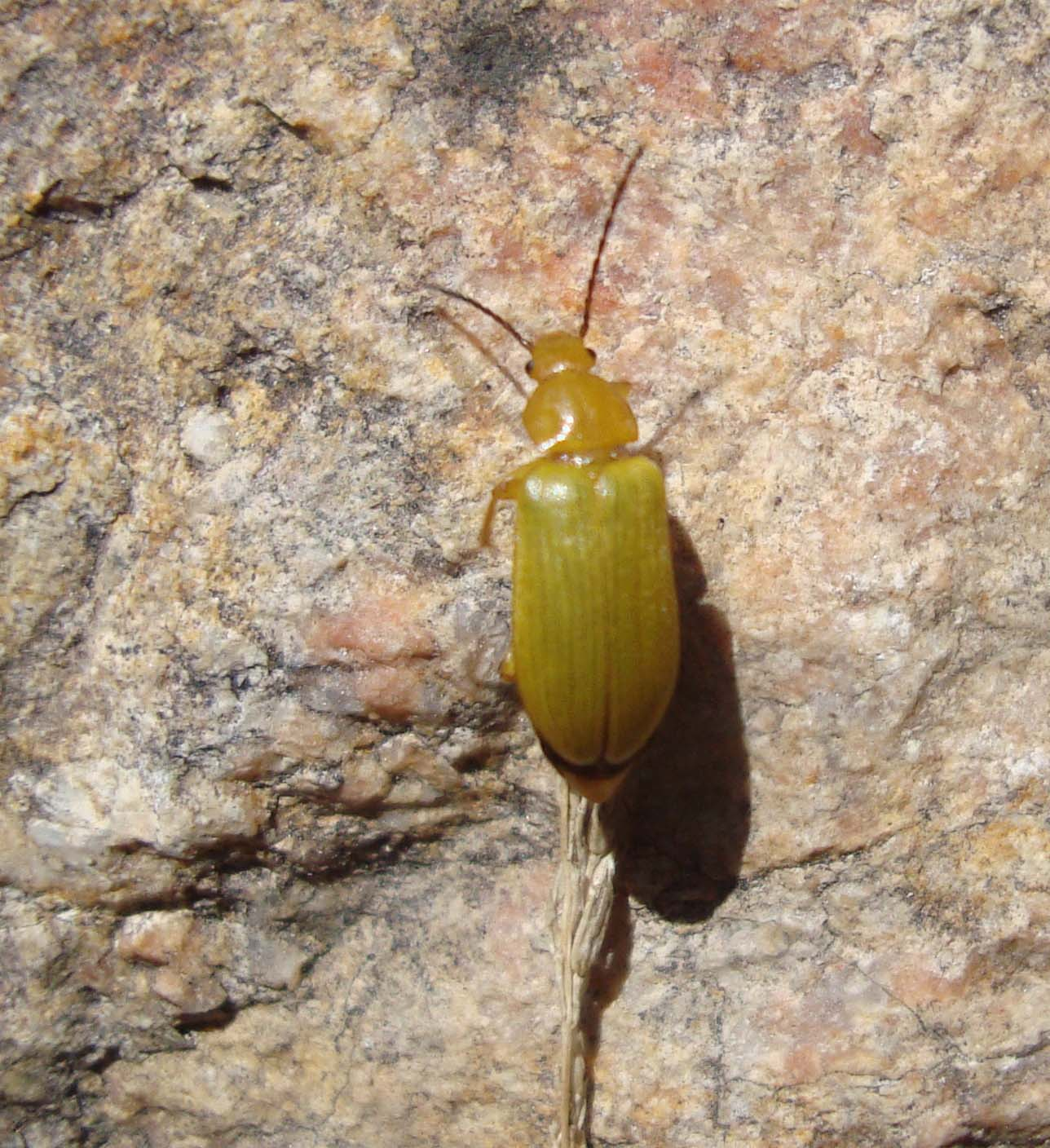

Scientific classification
- Kingdom: Animalia
- Phylum: Arthropoda
- Class: Insecta
- Order: Coleoptera
- Suborder: Polyphaga
- Infraorder: Cucujiformia
- Family: Tenebrionidae
- Genus: Cteniopus
- Species: C. sulphureus

Binomial name
- Cteniopus sulphureus (Linnaeus, 1758)

Synonyms
- Cteniopus flavus (Scopoli, 1763); Tenebrio flavus Scopoli, 1763

= Cteniopus sulphureus =

Species of beetle

Cteniopus sulphureus, the sulphur beetle, is a species of comb-clawed beetles belonging to the family Tenebrionidae subfamily Alleculinae.

These beetles are mainly present in Denmark, Finland, Slovenia, Italy and Sweden.

The adults grow up to 7–8 millimetres (0.28–0.31 in) long. Elytra are pale yellow, while head and pronotum are orange-yellow. The shape of the head is extended forward. These thermophilic beetles can mainly be encountered in sunny places on inflorescences of Apiaceae and Asteraceae species, especially Achillea species.

== Subspecies ==
- Cteniopus sulphureus var. analis Seidlitz
- Cteniopus sulphureus var. murinus Herbst
- Cteniopus sulphureus var. palpalis Seidlitz
- Cteniopus sulphureus var. sulphuratus Gmelin
