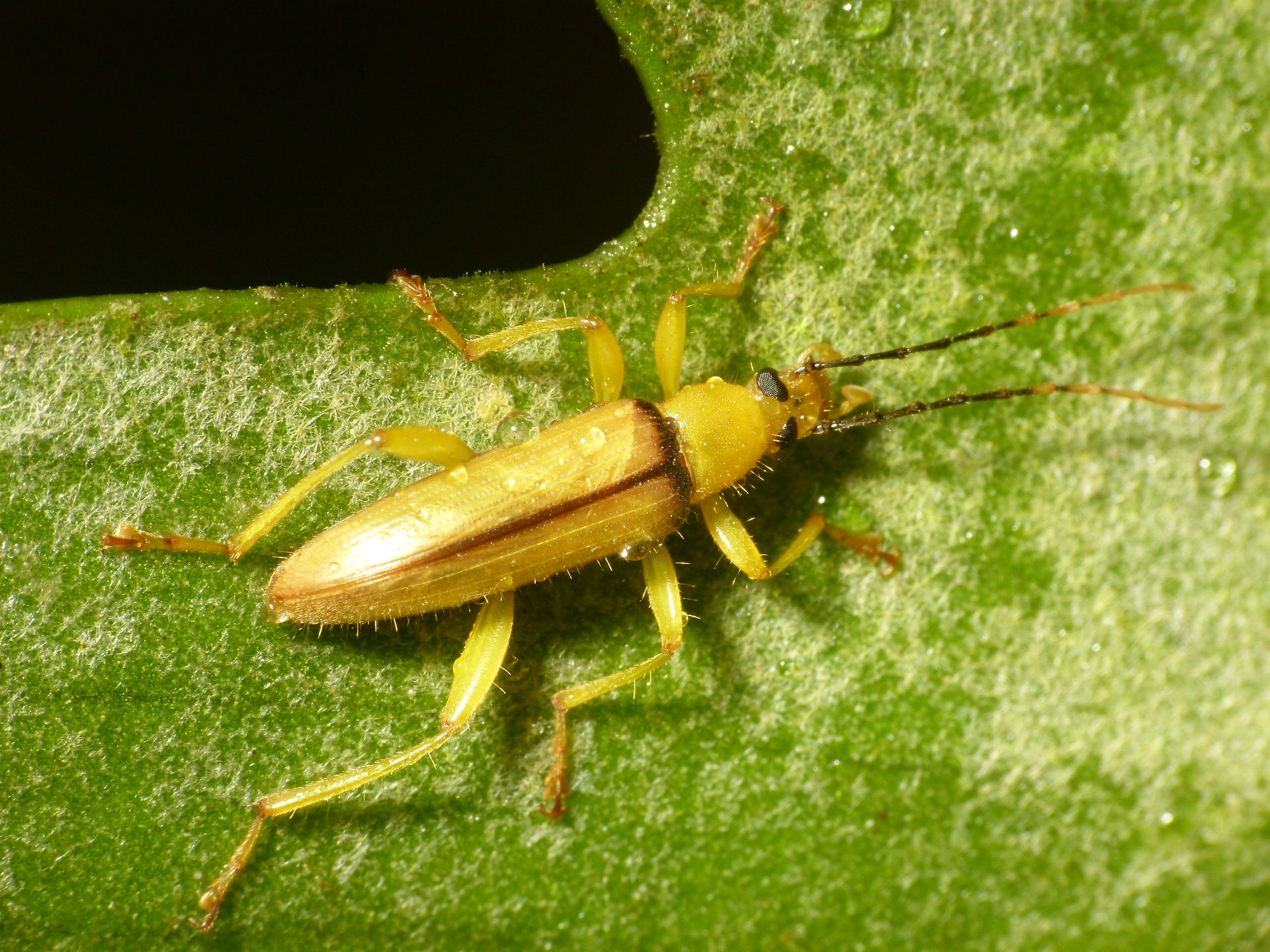
- A. sulphurea

Scientific classification
- Kingdom: Animalia
- Phylum: Arthropoda
- Clade: Pancrustacea
- Class: Insecta
- Order: Coleoptera
- Suborder: Polyphaga
- Infraorder: Cucujiformia
- Family: Tenebrionidae
- Subfamily: Alleculinae
- Genus: Asticostena; Fairmaire, 1897

Type species
- Asticostena alternata Fairmare, 1897

= Asticostena =

Genus of beetles

Asticostena is a genus of alleculine beetles with about 11 known species. They are found in tropical forests in Asia. The genus was described by Fairmaire in 1897 and is differentiated from the genus Allecula by the mesosternum being broader and with the third antennal segment being slightly shorter than the fourth. The body is long and narrow. Most species are from the Indian Subcontinent but A. basicornis was described from Java and A. niemayeri from Myanmar.

== Species ==
- A. alternata Fairmaire, 1897
- A. andrewesi Borchmann, 1937
- A. arunica Novak, 2021
- A. basicornis Borchmann, 1929
- A. cognata Borchman, 1937
- A. karanatakaensis Novak, 2005
- A. keralaensis Novak, 2005
- A. niemeyeri Borchmann, 1937
- A. nilgiriensis Borchmann, 1937
- A. pallidicolor Pic, 1909
- A. sulphurea Novak, 2005
