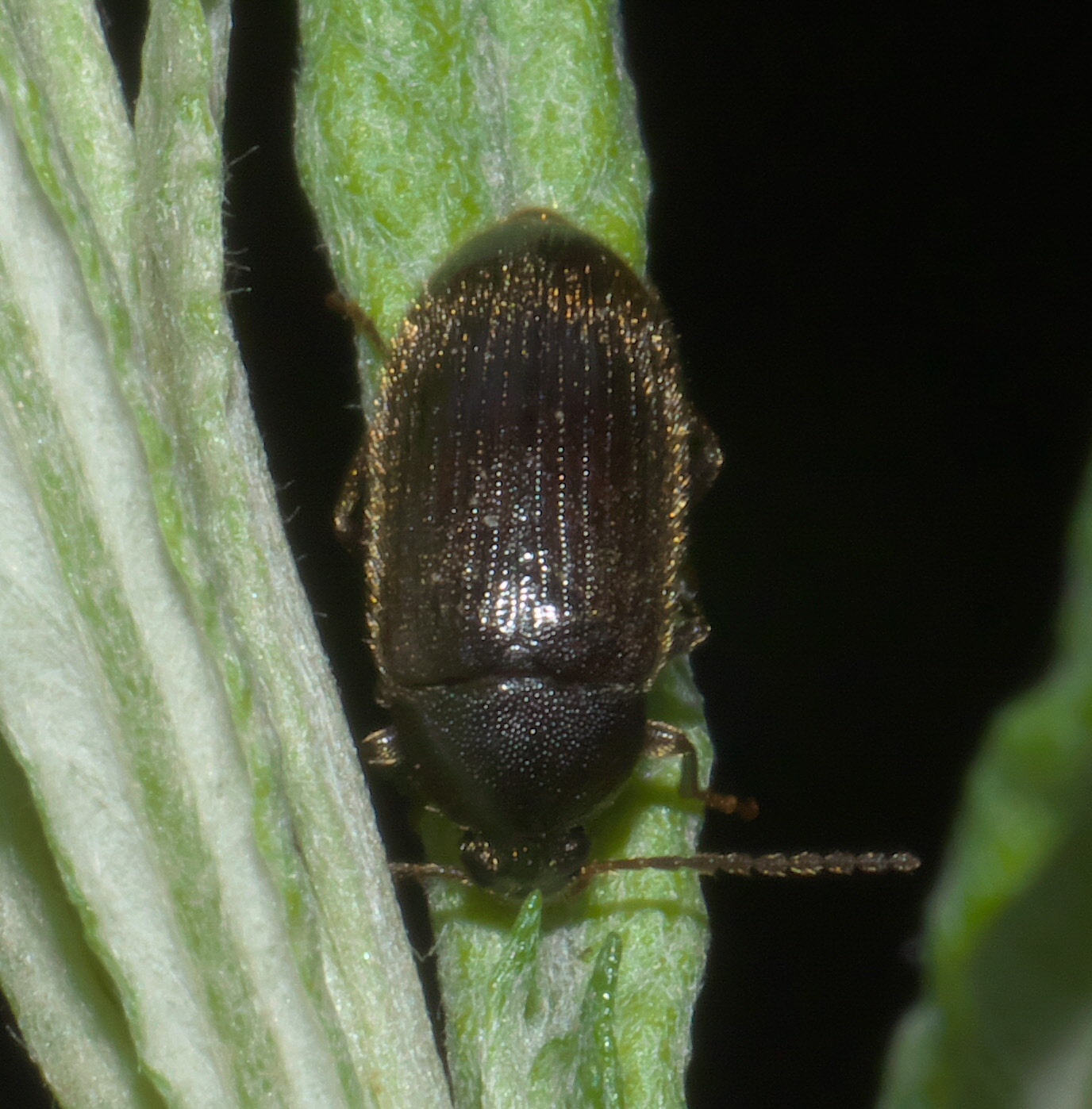
- Hymenorus arkansanus, Arkansas

Scientific classification
- Kingdom: Animalia
- Phylum: Arthropoda
- Class: Insecta
- Order: Coleoptera
- Suborder: Polyphaga
- Infraorder: Cucujiformia
- Family: Tenebrionidae
- Subfamily: Alleculinae
- Tribe: Alleculini
- Subtribe: Alleculina
- Genus: Hymenorus; Mulsant, 1852

= Hymenorus =

Genus of beetles

Hymenorus is a genus of comb-clawed beetles in the family Tenebrionidae. There are more than 160 described species in Hymenorus.

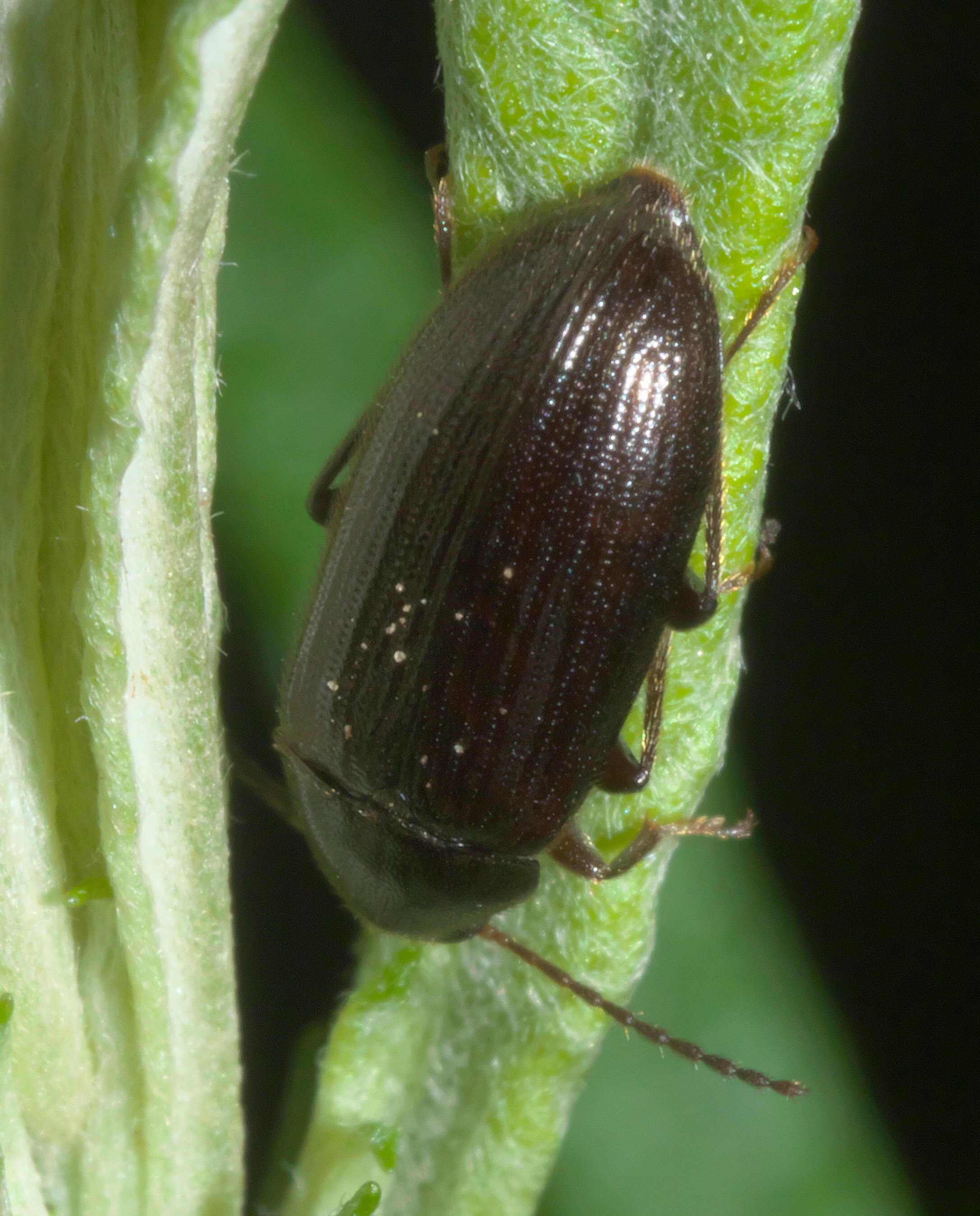
Hymenorus arkansanus, Arkansas

== Species ==
These 164 species belong to the genus Hymenorus:

- Hymenorus alienus Fall, 1931
- Hymenorus americanus Champion, 1888
- Hymenorus anguillae Campbell, 1971
- Hymenorus angustatus Champion, 1888
- Hymenorus antillensis Campbell, 1971
- Hymenorus apacheanus Casey, 1891
- Hymenorus arkansanus Fall, 1931
- Hymenorus atratus Fall, 1931
- Hymenorus badius Champion, 1888
- Hymenorus bahamensis Campbell, 1971
- Hymenorus balli Campbell, 2014
- Hymenorus baudii Seidlitz, 1896
- Hymenorus bifurcatus Campbell, 2014
- Hymenorus bitumescens Fall, 1931
- Hymenorus brevicornis Champion, 1888
- Hymenorus brevipes Champion, 1888
- Hymenorus brevis Fall, 1931
- Hymenorus caducus Fall, 1931
- Hymenorus campbelli Bouchard, 2018
- Hymenorus canaliculatus Champion, 1888
- Hymenorus capensis Fall, 1931
- Hymenorus cassus Fall, 1931
- Hymenorus castaneus Champion, 1888
- Hymenorus caurinus Fall, 1931
- Hymenorus chiapasensis Campbell, 1963
- Hymenorus chiriquensis Campbell, 1962
- Hymenorus colonoides Champion, 1888
- Hymenorus communis LeConte, 1866
- Hymenorus confertus LeConte, 1866
- Hymenorus conformis Fall, 1931
- Hymenorus conicicollis Fall, 1931
- Hymenorus convexus Casey, 1891
- Hymenorus corticarioides Champion, 1888
- Hymenorus crinitus Fall, 1931
- Hymenorus cubensis Campbell, 1971
- Hymenorus curticollis Casey, 1891
- Hymenorus darlingtoni Campbell, 1971
- Hymenorus densus LeConte, 1866
- Hymenorus deplanatus Champion, 1888
- Hymenorus depressus Champion, 1888
- Hymenorus dichrous Blatchley, 1919
- Hymenorus difficilis Casey, 1891
- Hymenorus digressus Fall, 1931
- Hymenorus discrepans Casey, 1891
- Hymenorus discretus Casey, 1891
- Hymenorus disparatus Fall, 1931
- Hymenorus dissensus Casey, 1891
- Hymenorus distinctus Fall, 1931
- Hymenorus dorsalis Schwarz, 1878
- Hymenorus doublieri
- Hymenorus dubius Fall, 1931
- Hymenorus durangoensis Champion, 1888
- Hymenorus emmenastoides Champion, 1888
- Hymenorus excavatus Campbell, 2014
- Hymenorus exiguus Casey, 1891
- Hymenorus exilis Fall, 1931
- Hymenorus facetus Fall, 1931
- Hymenorus farri Campbell
- Hymenorus flohri Champion, 1888
- Hymenorus floridanus Casey, 1891
- Hymenorus forreri Champion, 1888
- Hymenorus foveiventris Champion, 1888
- Hymenorus fuscipennis Fall, 1931
- Hymenorus fusculus Casey, 1891
- Hymenorus fusicornis Casey, 1891
- Hymenorus grandicollis Champion, 1888
- Hymenorus granulatus Blatchley, 1912
- Hymenorus guatemalensis Champion, 1888
- Hymenorus haitellus Campbell, 1971
- Hymenorus haitius Campbell, 1971
- Hymenorus haydeni Wickham, 1914
- Hymenorus helvinus Casey, 1891
- Hymenorus heteropygus Fall, 1931
- Hymenorus hispaniolensis Campbell, 1971
- Hymenorus hispidulus Champion, 1888
- Hymenorus horrescens Fall, 1931
- Hymenorus humeralis LeConte, 1866
- Hymenorus idoneus Fall, 1931
- Hymenorus igualensis Champion, 1888
- Hymenorus illusus Fall, 1931
- Hymenorus inaequalis Casey, 1891
- Hymenorus incertus Fall, 1931
- Hymenorus indutus Casey, 1891
- Hymenorus infuscatus Casey, 1891
- Hymenorus inopiatus Fall, 1931
- Hymenorus inquilinus Casey, 1891
- Hymenorus insularis Campbell, 1971
- Hymenorus intermedius Casey, 1891
- Hymenorus inutilis Fall, 1931
- Hymenorus irritus Fall, 1931
- Hymenorus jacobinus Fall, 1931
- Hymenorus jamaicensis Campbell, 1971
- Hymenorus laticollis Champion, 1888
- Hymenorus longicollis Champion, 1888
- Hymenorus macilentus Fall, 1931
- Hymenorus maritimus Champion, 1888
- Hymenorus megops Hatch, 1965
- Hymenorus melsheimeri Casey, 1891
- Hymenorus milleporus Fall, 1931
- Hymenorus minutus Campbell, 1971
- Hymenorus molestus Fall, 1931
- Hymenorus montivagus Fall, 1931
- Hymenorus nevadensis Fall, 1931
- Hymenorus niger Melsheimer, 1846
- Hymenorus nitidipennis Casey, 1891
- Hymenorus obesus Casey, 1891
- Hymenorus oblivius Fall, 1931
- Hymenorus obscura
- Hymenorus obscurus (Say, 1826)
- Hymenorus occidentalis Champion, 1888
- Hymenorus oculatus Champion, 1888
- Hymenorus pallidus Champion, 1888
- Hymenorus panamensis Campbell, 1962
- Hymenorus papagonis Fall, 1931
- Hymenorus parvicollis Champion, 1888
- Hymenorus parvus Fall, 1931
- Hymenorus perforatus Casey, 1891
- Hymenorus picipennis Casey, 1891
- Hymenorus pilosus (Melsheimer, 1846)
- Hymenorus pini Champion, 1888
- Hymenorus planulus Horn, 1894
- Hymenorus porosicornis Casey, 1891
- Hymenorus prolixus Casey, 1891
- Hymenorus protibialis Fall, 1931
- Hymenorus punctatissimus LeConte, 1866
- Hymenorus punctulatus (LeConte, 1859)
- Hymenorus pygmaeus Campbell, 1971
- Hymenorus quietus Fall, 1931
- Hymenorus rotundicollis Casey, 1891
- Hymenorus rufescens Champion, 1888
- Hymenorus ruficollis Champion, 1888
- Hymenorus rufohumeralis Campbell, 1982
- Hymenorus rufovalis Fall, 1931
- Hymenorus scutellatus Pic, 1901
- Hymenorus segnis Champion, 1888
- Hymenorus semirufus Fall, 1931
- Hymenorus seriatus Casey, 1891
- Hymenorus setosus Hatch, 1965
- Hymenorus significans Fall, 1931
- Hymenorus similis Champion, 1888
- Hymenorus simiolus Fall, 1931
- Hymenorus sinuatus Fall, 1931
- Hymenorus sobrinus Casey, 1891
- Hymenorus sordidus Champion, 1888
- Hymenorus sparsepunctatus Campbell, 1971
- Hymenorus spinifer Horn, 1894
- Hymenorus striatus (Pic, 1930)
- Hymenorus tarsalis Champion, 1888
- Hymenorus tenellus Casey, 1891
- Hymenorus tenuistriatus Fall, 1931
- Hymenorus testaceus Casey, 1891
- Hymenorus texensis Fall, 1931
- Hymenorus thoracicus Fall, 1931
- Hymenorus tibialis Champion, 1888
- Hymenorus torridus Champion, 1888
- Hymenorus transversus Campbell, 1971
- Hymenorus tritus Fall, 1931
- Hymenorus triuialis
- Hymenorus trivialis Fall, 1931
- Hymenorus ulomoides Fall, 1931
- Hymenorus uniseriatus Casey, 1891
- Hymenorus vigilax Fall, 1931
- Hymenorus villosus Champion, 1888
- Hymenorus wolcotti Campbell, 1971
