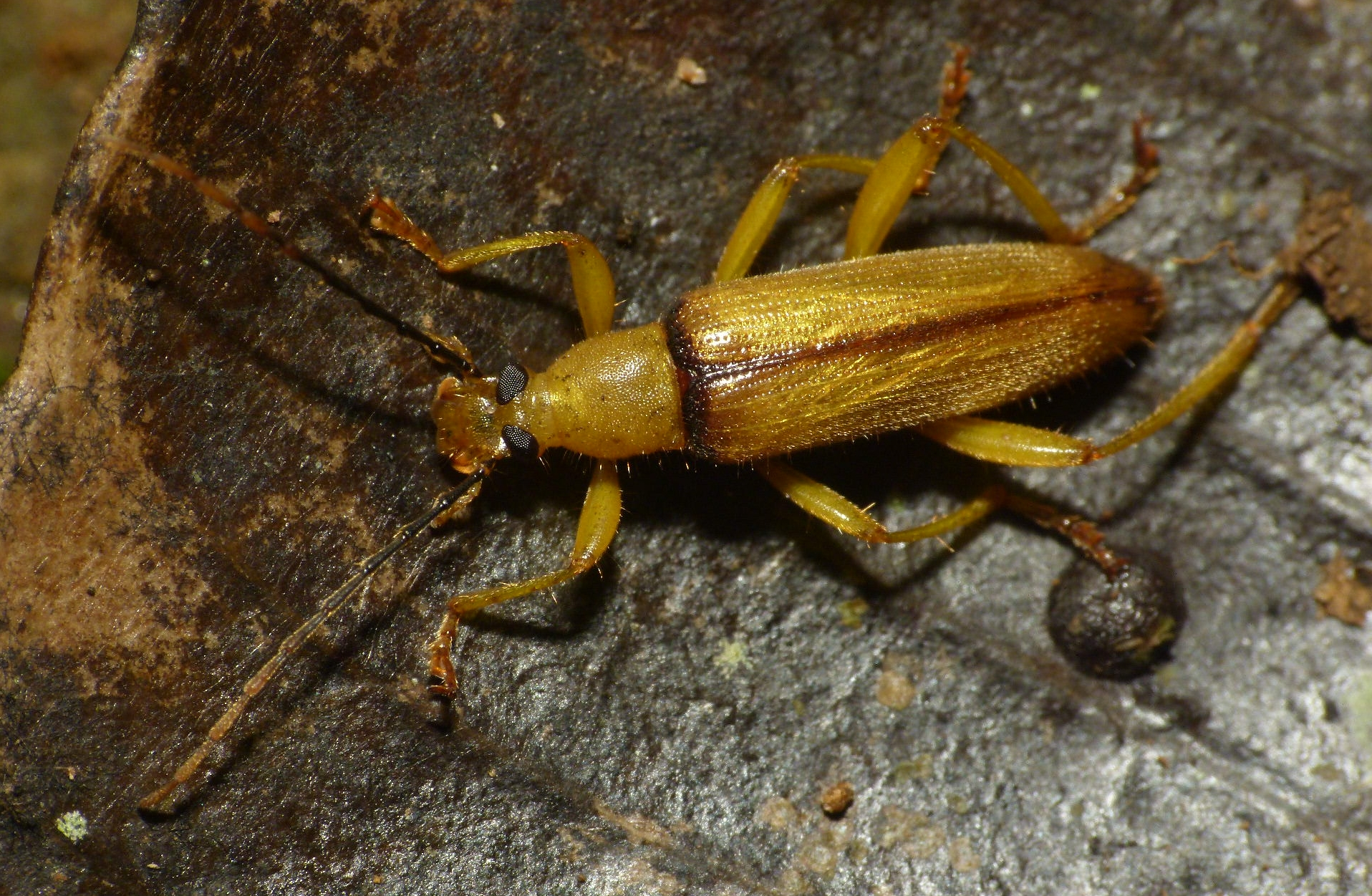

Scientific classification
- Kingdom: Animalia
- Phylum: Arthropoda
- Clade: Pancrustacea
- Class: Insecta
- Order: Coleoptera
- Suborder: Polyphaga
- Infraorder: Cucujiformia
- Family: Tenebrionidae
- Genus: Asticostena
- Species: A. sulphurea

Binomial name
- Asticostena sulphurea Novak, 2005

= Asticostena sulphurea =

Species of beetle

Asticostena sulphurea is a species of alleculine beetle endemic to the Western Ghats of India. The species was described in 2005 along with two other species from the Western Ghats - Asticostena karanatakaensis and Asticostena keralaensis. A. karanatakaensis has narrow uniformly spaced dark lines running longitudinally on the elytra with the raised ridges being yellow. A. keralaensis also has dark lines but is broken up by two broad raised yellow ridges. A. sulphurea is uniformly sulphur yellow on the elytra with punctures distributed on it and lacking any ridges. The base of the wing and the elytral suture are dark. Three other species are known from the nearby Nilgiri ranges, A. andrewesi, A. cognata, and A. nilgiriensis. Little is known of their biology.
