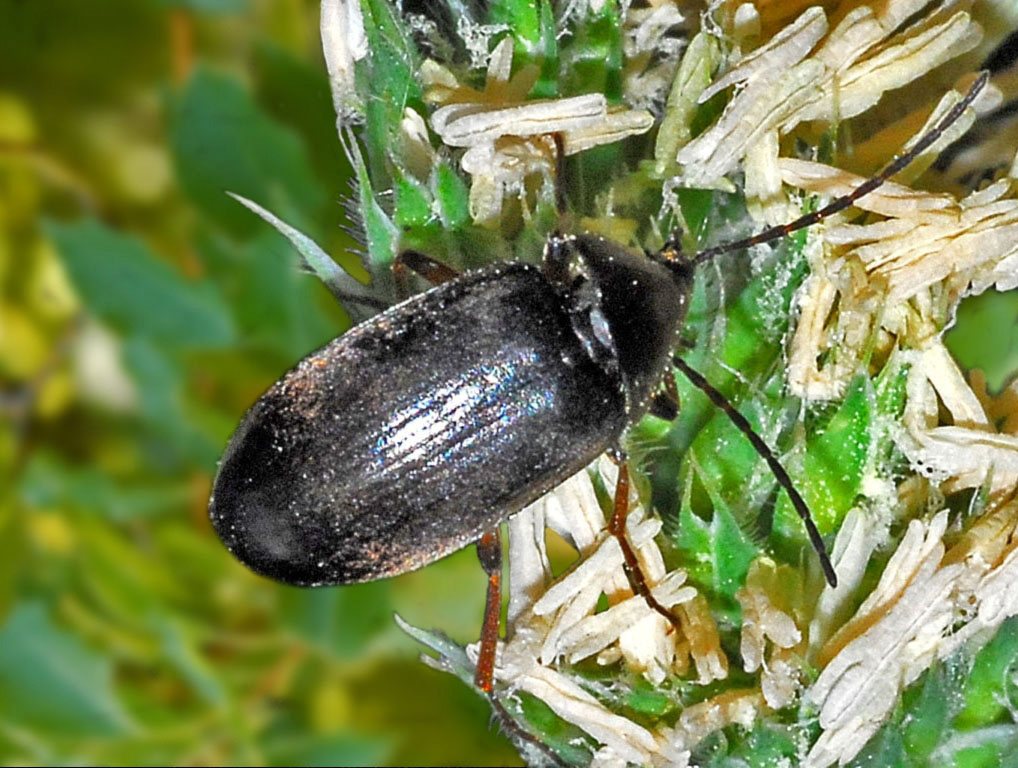
- Isomira hypocrita

Scientific classification
- Kingdom: Animalia
- Phylum: Arthropoda
- Class: Insecta
- Order: Coleoptera
- Suborder: Polyphaga
- Infraorder: Cucujiformia
- Family: Tenebrionidae
- Genus: Isomira
- Species: I. hypocrita

Binomial name
- Isomira hypocrita Mulsant, 1856

= Isomira hypocrita =

Species of beetle

Isomira hypocrita is a species of comb-clawed beetles belonging to the family Tenebrionidae subfamily Alleculinae.

== Distribution and habitat ==
This species can be found in the central and southern Europe and throughout the Alps and Pyrenees (Austria, France, Germany, Italy, Switzerland and Slovenia). It only inhabits montane areas.

== Description ==
Isomira hypocrita can reach a body length of about 7–85 mm (0.28–3.35 in). These rather large comb-clawed beetles have a quite strong and silky shiny black body, with elongated, almost oval elytra. Pronotum and elytra are strongly but finely dotted, with flat interspaces of the wrinkles. Hairiness of the back is short, fine and not very dense. Antennae, legs and mouth are yellow-brown to brown. Also the elytra may be yellow-brown.
