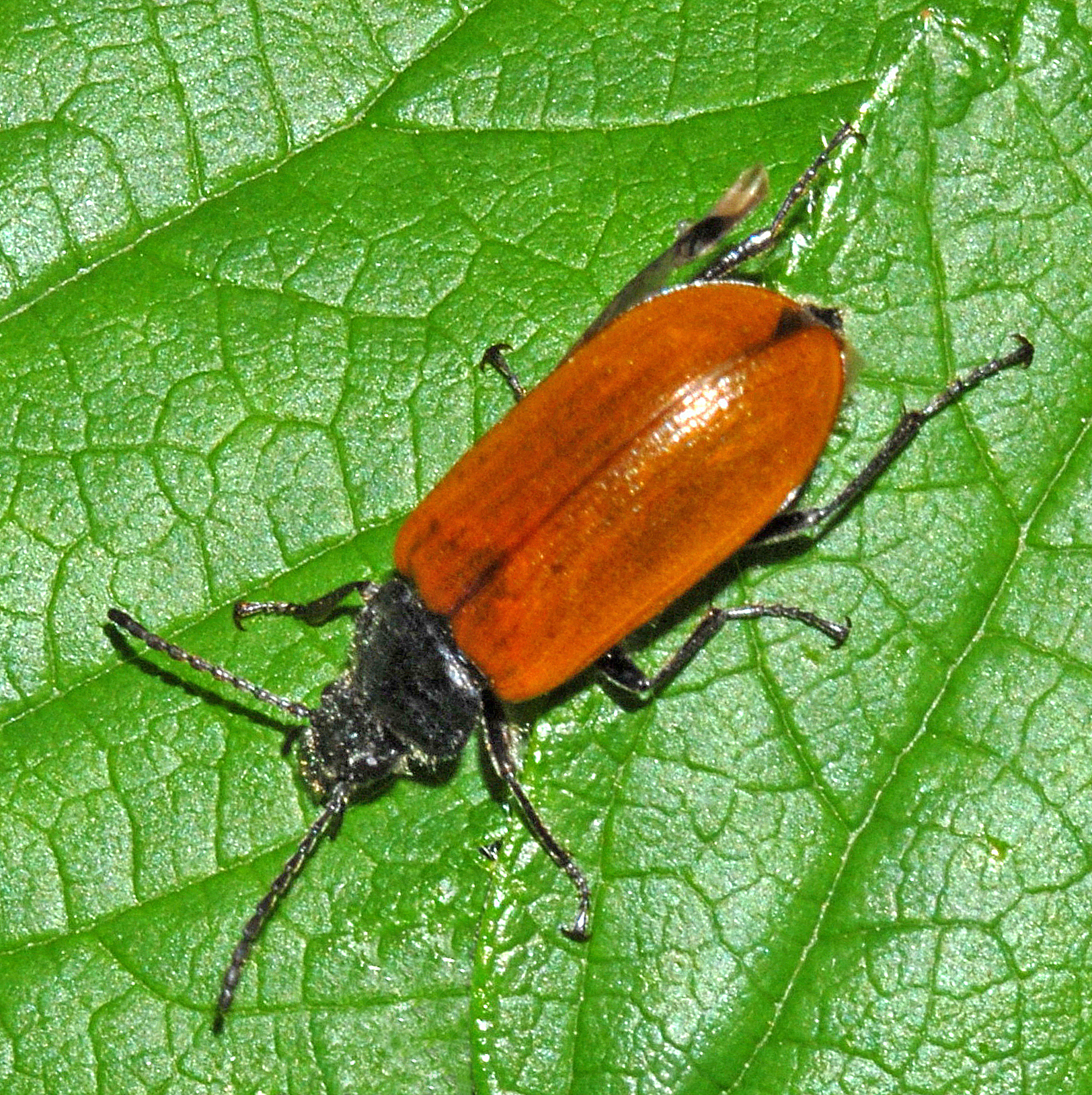
- Omophlus lepturoides. Dorsal view

Scientific classification
- Kingdom: Animalia
- Phylum: Arthropoda
- Class: Insecta
- Order: Coleoptera
- Suborder: Polyphaga
- Infraorder: Cucujiformia
- Family: Tenebrionidae
- Genus: Omophlus
- Species: O. lepturoides

Binomial name
- Omophlus lepturoides (Fabricius, 1787)

Synonyms
- Odontomophlus lepturoides

= Omophlus lepturoides =

Species of beetle

Omophlus lepturoides is a species of comb-clawed beetles belonging to the family Tenebrionidae subfamily Alleculinae.

== Etymology ==
The Latin species name lepturoides derives from Leptura (genus of beetles in the family Cerambycidae) and eides, meaning similar.

== Distribution and habitat ==
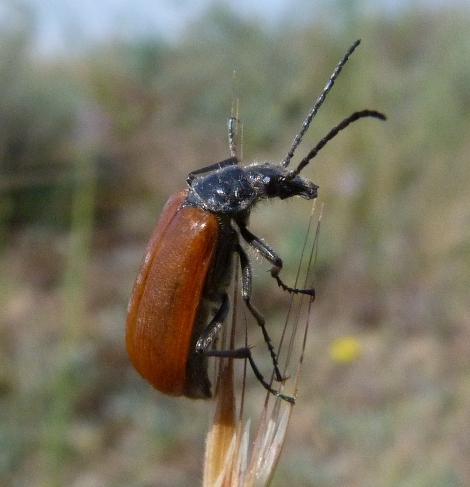
Side view

This species is present in Europe (Austria, Germany, Italy, Poland). It can also be found in Southeast Asia and Russia, from Ukraine to the Caucasus. These beetles inhabit heat and sunny areas.

== Description ==
Omophlus lepturoides can reach a body length of 11–16 millimetres (0.43–0.63 in). Head and pronotum are black and rather hairy. Elytra are reddish-brown. Legs are black.

== Biology ==
Adults can be found from April to June. They feed on inflorescences of many different plants, while the larvae feed on roots of various plants, also cultivated (especially potatoes, wheat and maize). They overwinter as larvae in the soil.
