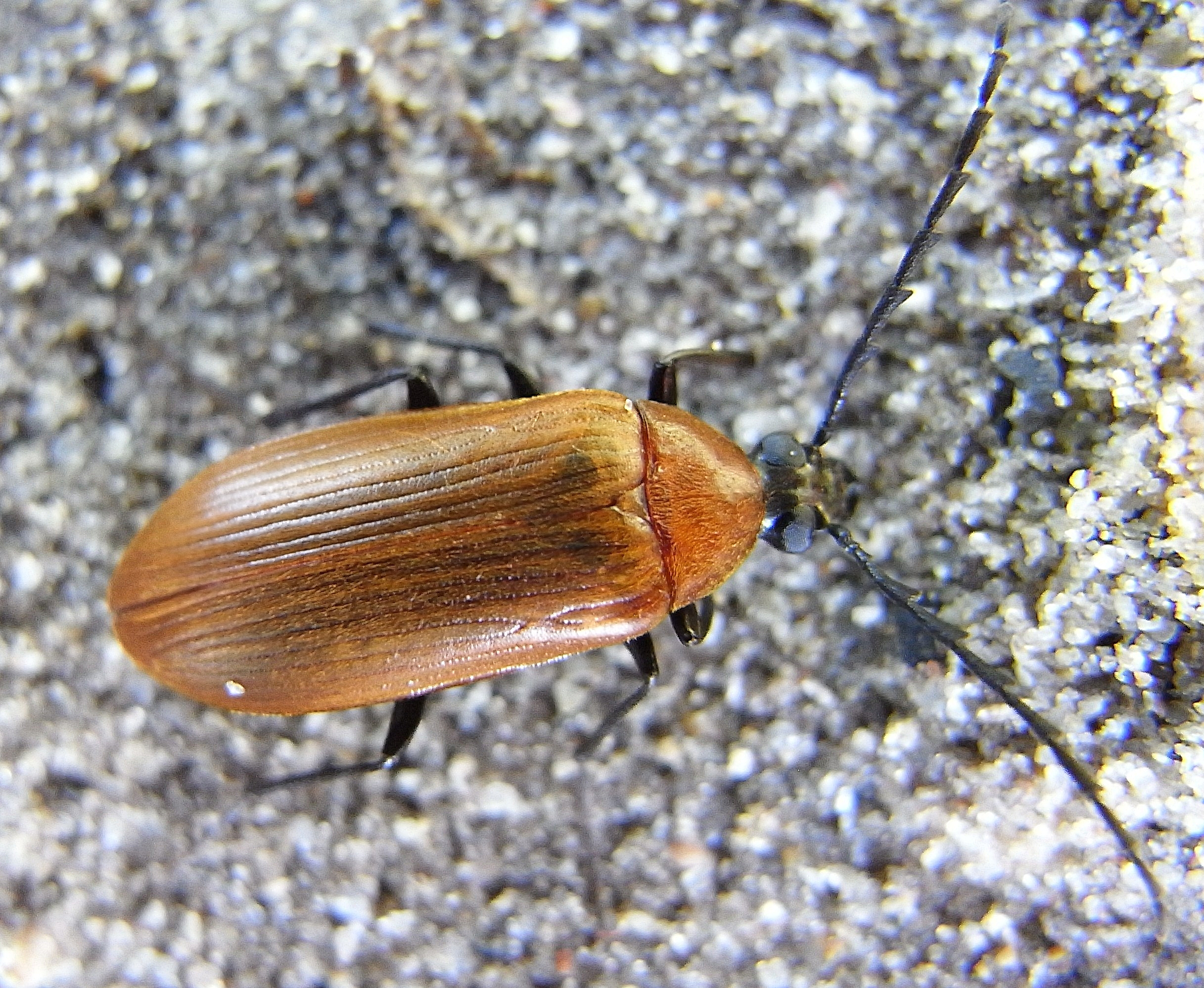
- Pseudocistela ceramboides

Scientific classification
- Domain: Eukaryota
- Kingdom: Animalia
- Phylum: Arthropoda
- Class: Insecta
- Order: Coleoptera
- Suborder: Polyphaga
- Infraorder: Cucujiformia
- Family: Tenebrionidae
- Subfamily: Alleculinae
- Tribe: Alleculini
- Subtribe: Gonoderina
- Genus: Pseudocistela; Crotch, 1873

= Pseudocistela =

Genus of beetles

Pseudocistela is a genus of darkling beetles in the family Tenebrionidae. There are about 18 described species in Pseudocistela, one of which is extinct.

== Species ==
- Pseudocistela brevis (Say)
- Pseudocistela ceramboides (Linnaeus, 1758)
- Pseudocistela crassicornis (Sharp, 1885)
- Pseudocistela kauaiensis (Perkins, 1900)
- Pseudocistela konae (Perkins, 1900)
- Pseudocistela laevis (Kuster, 1850)
- Pseudocistela marginata (Ziegler)
- Pseudocistela mauiae Zimmerman, 1940
- Pseudocistela nigricollis (Perkins, 1900)
- Pseudocistela opaca (LeConte, 1859)
- Pseudocistela pacifica
- Pseudocistela pectinata Hopping, 1933
- Pseudocistela pinguis (LeConte, 1859)
- Pseudocistela sericea (Drapiez, 1828)
- Pseudocistela subaenescens (Perkins, 1900)
- Pseudocistela subsulcata (Fairmaire, 1861)
- Pseudocistela varians (Fabricius, 1787)
- †Pseudocistela gracilis Förster, 1891
