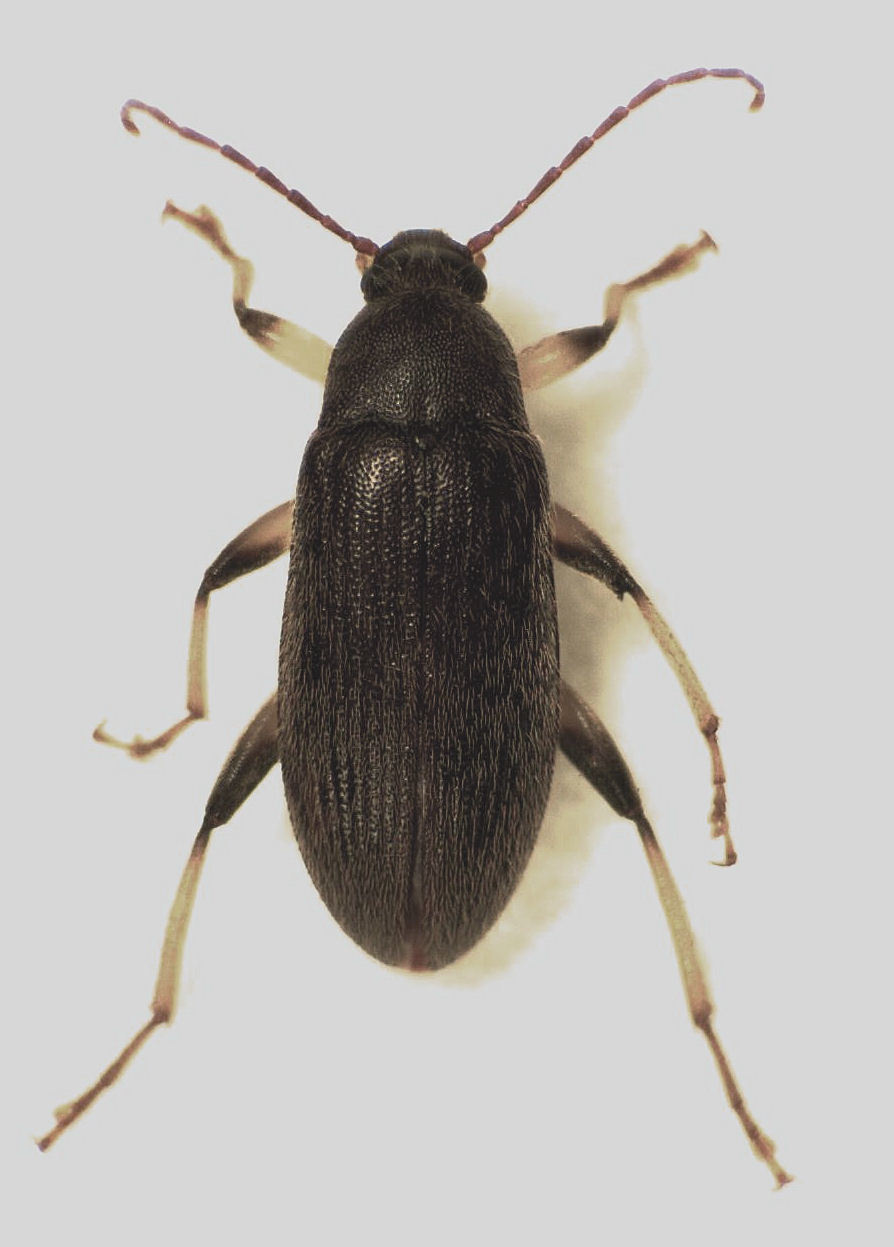
- Homotrysis macleayi

Scientific classification
- Kingdom: Animalia
- Phylum: Arthropoda
- Clade: Pancrustacea
- Class: Insecta
- Order: Coleoptera
- Suborder: Polyphaga
- Infraorder: Cucujiformia
- Family: Tenebrionidae
- Genus: Homotrysis
- Species: H. macleayi

Binomial name
- Homotrysis macleayi (Borchmann, 1909)

= Homotrysis macleayi =

Species of beetle

Homotrysis macleayi is a species of darkling beetles native to Australia. It is an established exotic in New Zealand.
