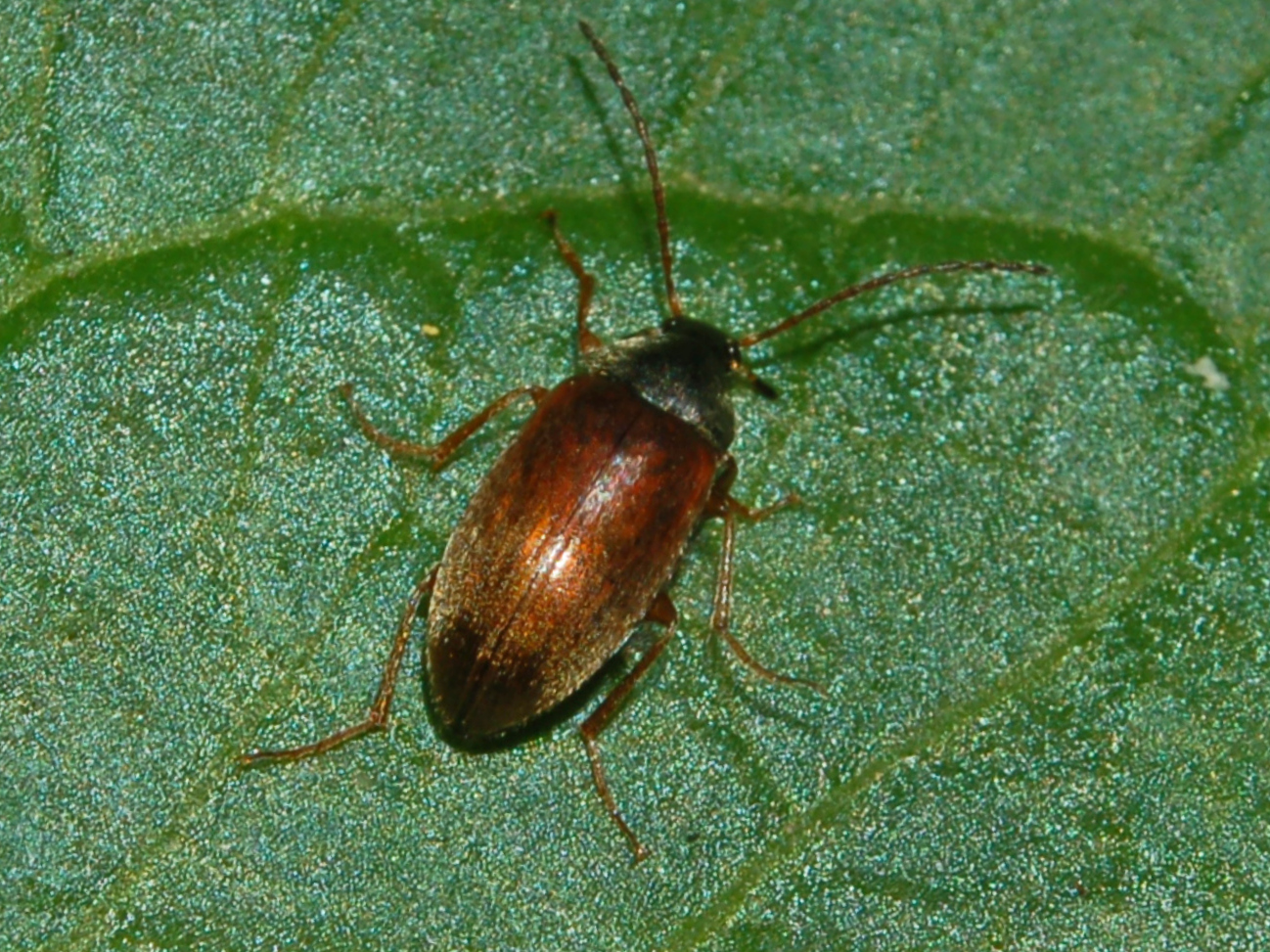
- Isomira sp. – Dorsal view
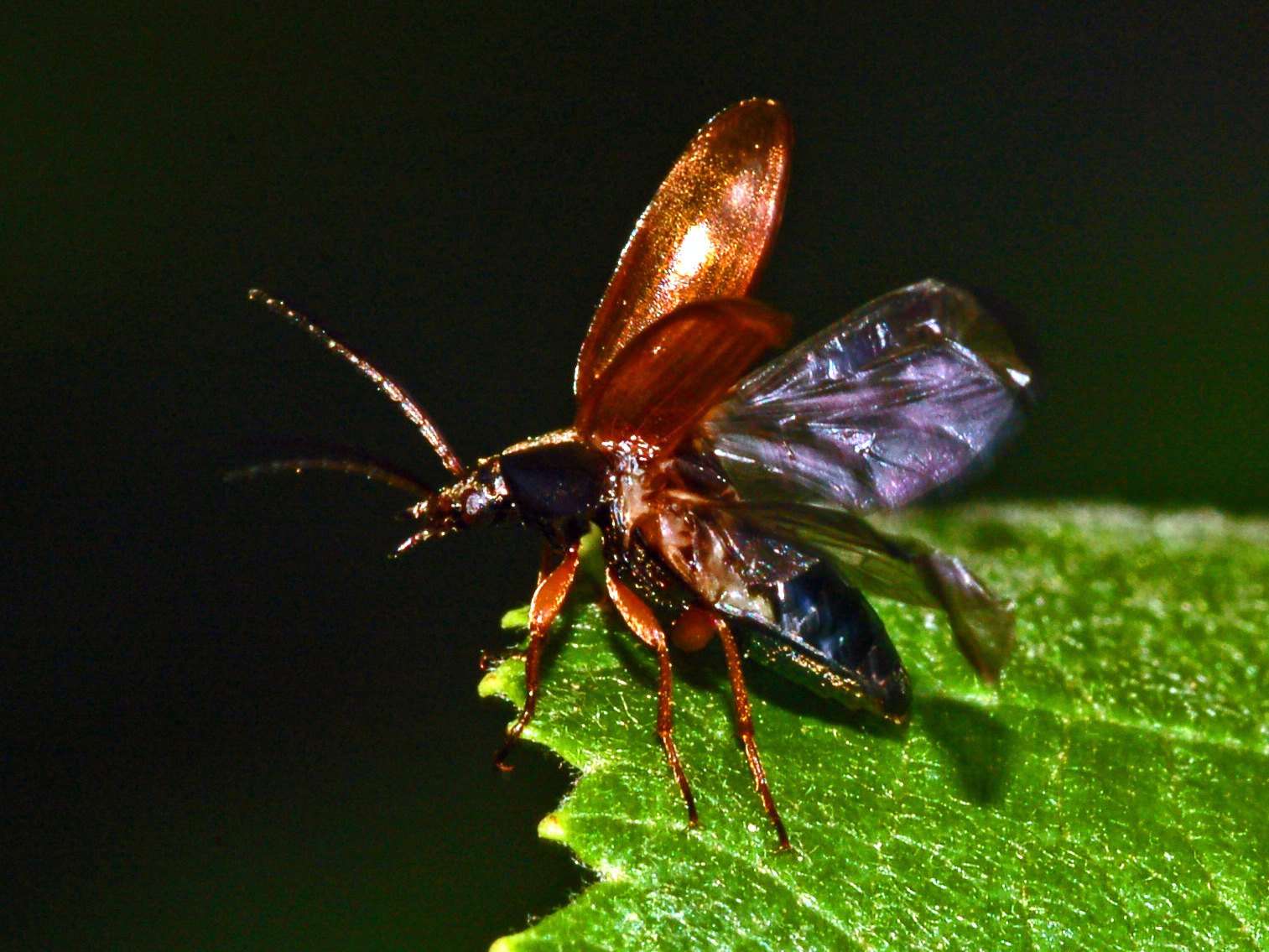
- Lateral view

Scientific classification
- Domain: Eukaryota
- Kingdom: Animalia
- Phylum: Arthropoda
- Class: Insecta
- Order: Coleoptera
- Suborder: Polyphaga
- Infraorder: Cucujiformia
- Family: Tenebrionidae
- Subfamily: Alleculinae
- Genus: Isomira; Mulsant, 1856

= Isomira =

Genus of beetles

Isomira is a genus of comb-clawed beetles belonging to the family Tenebrionidae.

== Selected species ==
- Isomira antennata (Panzer, 1798)
- Isomira hypocrita Mulsant, 1856
- Isomira icteropa (Küster, 1852)
- Isomira marcida (Kiesenwetter, 1863)
- Isomira murina (Linnaeus, 1758)
- Isomira testacea Seidlitz, 1896
- Isomira thoracica (Fabricius, 1792)
- Isomira umbellatarum (Kiesenwetter, 1863)
