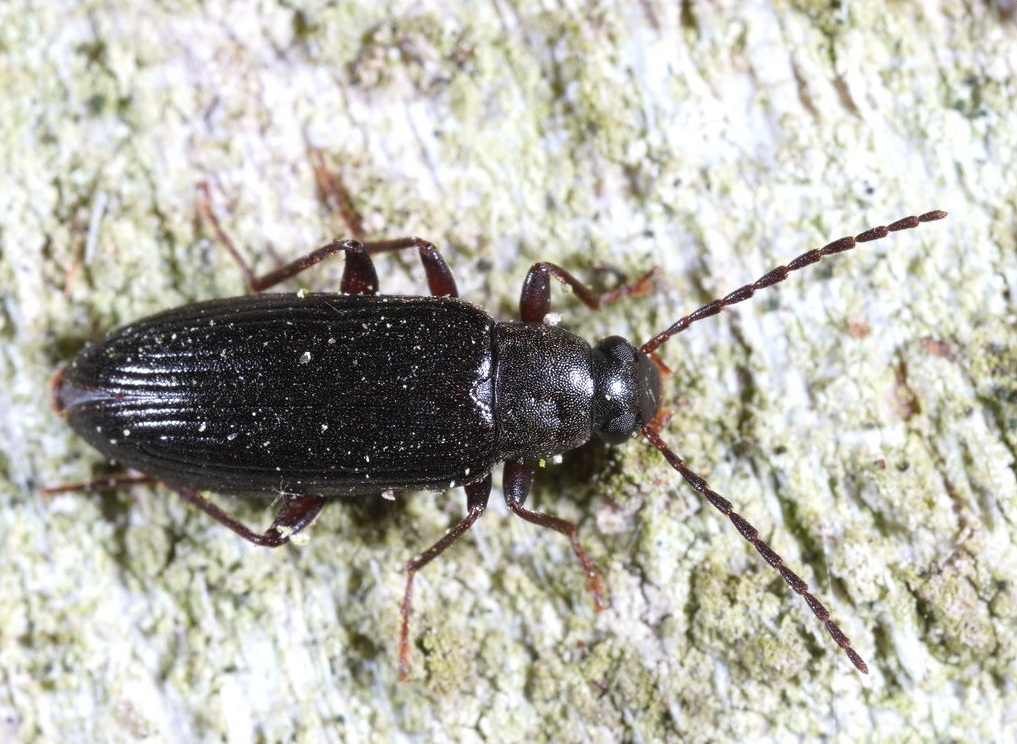

Scientific classification
- Kingdom: Animalia
- Phylum: Arthropoda
- Class: Insecta
- Order: Coleoptera
- Suborder: Polyphaga
- Infraorder: Cucujiformia
- Family: Tenebrionidae
- Genus: Allecula
- Species: A. morio

Binomial name
- Allecula morio (Fabricius, 1787)

= Allecula morio =

Species of beetle

Allecula morio is a species of beetle belonging to the family Tenebrionidae.

It is native to Europe.
