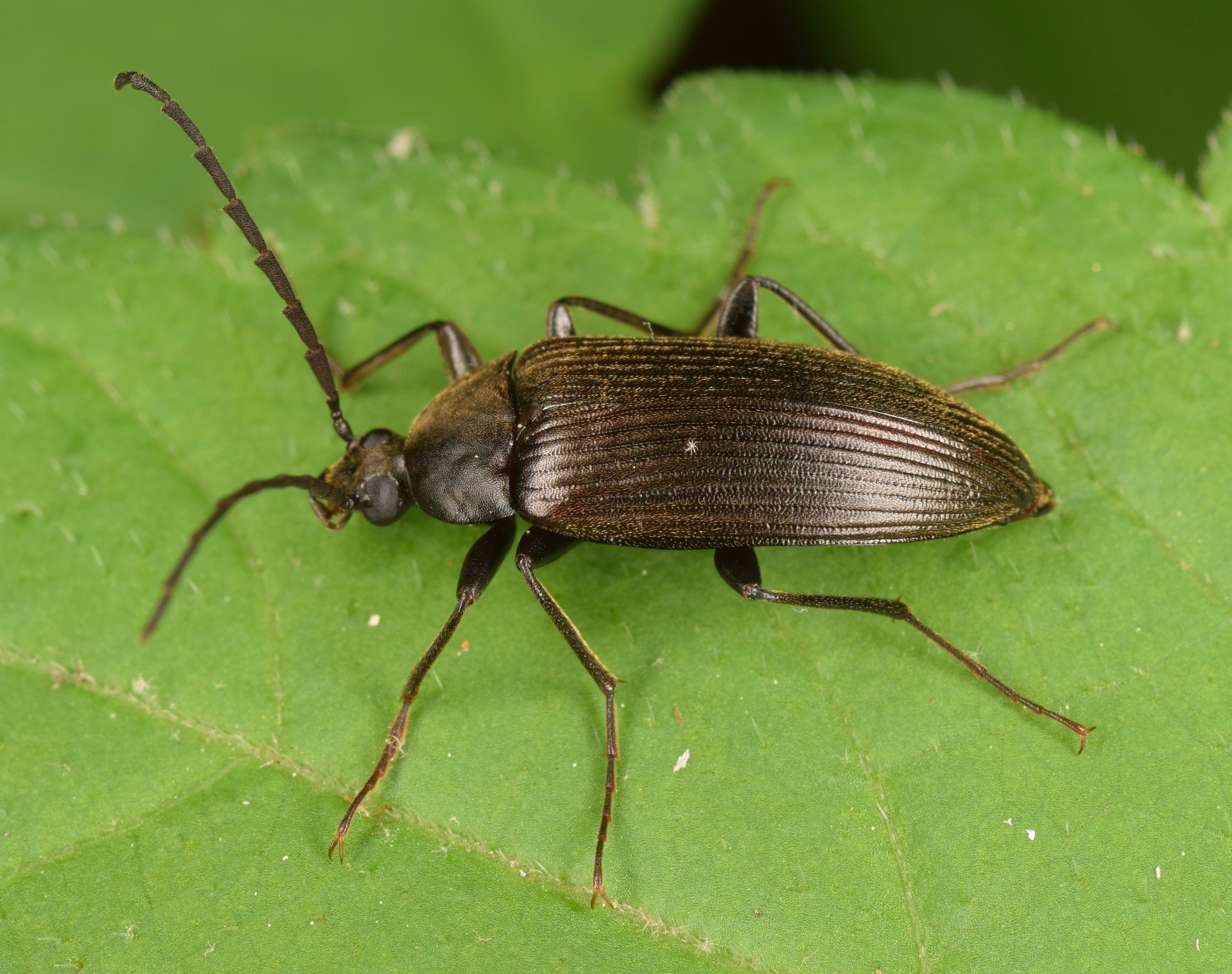
- Capnochroa fuliginosa

Scientific classification
- Kingdom: Animalia
- Phylum: Arthropoda
- Class: Insecta
- Order: Coleoptera
- Suborder: Polyphaga
- Infraorder: Cucujiformia
- Family: Tenebrionidae
- Tribe: Alleculini
- Subtribe: Gonoderina
- Genus: Capnochroa; LeConte, 1862

= Capnochroa =

Genus of beetles

Capnochroa is a genus of comb-clawed beetles in the family Tenebrionidae. There are at least two described species in Capnochroa.

== Species ==
These two species belong to the genus Capnochroa:

- Capnochroa fuliginosa (Melsheimer) (comb-clawed beetle)
- Capnochroa senilis Wickham, 1913
