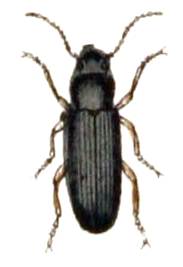
- Allecula morio

Scientific classification
- Domain: Eukaryota
- Kingdom: Animalia
- Phylum: Arthropoda
- Class: Insecta
- Order: Coleoptera
- Suborder: Polyphaga
- Infraorder: Cucujiformia
- Family: Tenebrionidae
- Subfamily: Alleculinae
- Tribe: Alleculini
- Subtribe: Alleculina
- Genus: Allecula; Fabricius, 1801

Synonyms
- Alleculina Pic, 1954; Diatopsis Laporte, 1840

= Allecula =

Genus of beetles

Allecula is a genus of beetles belonging to the family Tenebrionidae. It was first erected by Johan Christian Fabricius in 1801.

The genus has a cosmopolitan distribution.

== Species ==
The following species are recognised in the genus Allecula:

- Allecula angustata Champion, 1888
- Allecula anthracina Fauvel, 1905
- Allecula aterrima Rosenhauer, 1847
- Allecula austriaca Zhang, 1989
- Allecula belti Champion, 1888
- Allecula brachyptera Doyen, 1990
- Allecula caribea Campbell, 1971
- Allecula castaneipennis Champion, 1888
- Allecula comorana Fairmaire, 1893
- Allecula cupripennis Fauvel, 1905
- Allecula curticollis Fauvel, 1905
- Allecula dahanshana Masumoto et al., 2017
- Allecula depressa Champion, 1888
- Allecula fauveli Borchmann, 1909
- Allecula fenghuangshana Masumoto et al., 2017
- Allecula ferox Champion, 1888
- Allecula formosana Pic, 1910
- Allecula gaumeri Champion, 1888
- Allecula inconspicua Borchmann, 1937
- Allecula insulana Fauvel, 1905
- Allecula laevior Fauvel, 1905
- Allecula laticeps Champion, 1888
- Allecula maculicornis Fairmaire, 1893
- Allecula matsudai Masumoto, Novak, Akita & Lee, 2019
- Allecula maxima Pic, 1910
- Allecula montana Fauvel, 1905
- Allecula morio (Fabricius, 1787)
- Allecula opacipennis Champion, 1888
- Allecula opacula Fauvel, 1905
- Allecula palmarum (Montrouzier, 1860)
- Allecula phyllocera Fauvel, 1905
- Allecula pilipes Champion, 1888
- Allecula puberula (Montrouzier, 1860)
- Allecula puncticollis Boheman, 1858
- Allecula pusilla Fauvel, 1905
- Allecula quadrillum Fauvel, 1905
- Allecula ramosi Campbell, 1971
- Allecula rhenana Bach, 1856
- Allecula rugicollis Champion, 1888
- Allecula simplex Fauvel, 1905
- Allecula strigicollis Fauvel, 1905
- Allecula suberina Novák, 2012
- Allecula tenuicornis Fauvel, 1905
- Allecula tristis Germar, 1848
- Allecula umbilicata Seidlitz, 1896
- Allecula umbonata Fauvel, 1905
- Allecula veraepacis Champion, 1888
- Cistela dominula (Heer, 1847)
- BOLD:ADG3671 (Allecula sp.)
