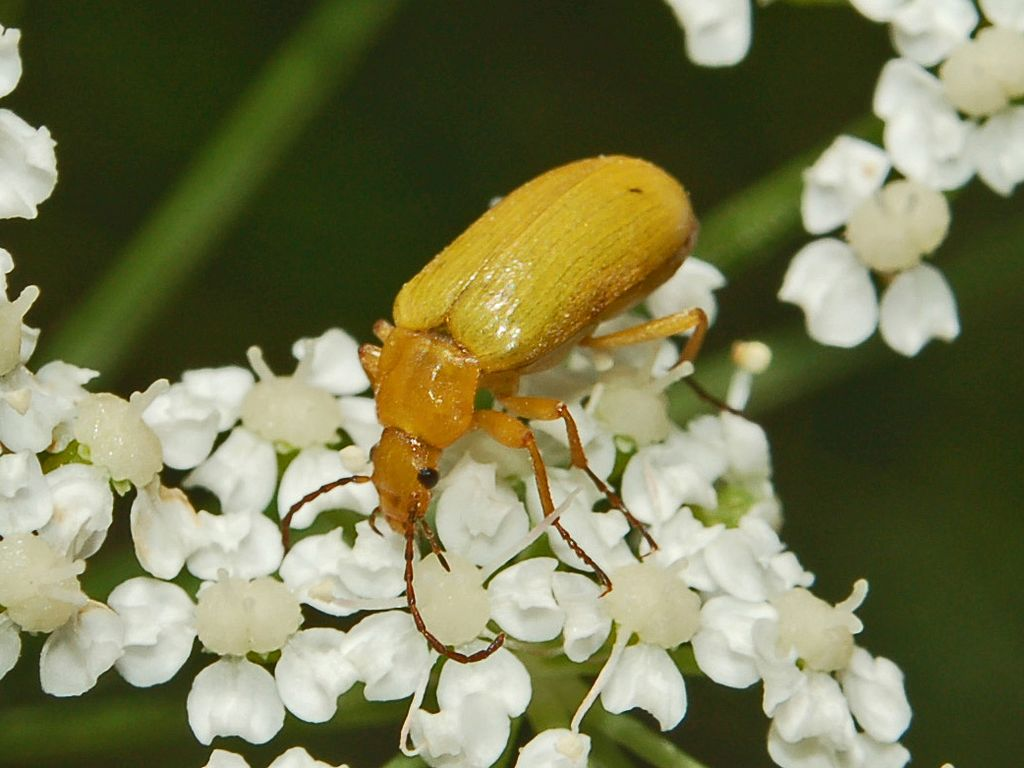
- Cteniopus sulphureus

Scientific classification
- Domain: Eukaryota
- Kingdom: Animalia
- Phylum: Arthropoda
- Class: Insecta
- Order: Coleoptera
- Suborder: Polyphaga
- Infraorder: Cucujiformia
- Family: Tenebrionidae
- Subfamily: Alleculinae
- Genus: Cteniopus; Solier, 1835

= Cteniopus =

Genus of beetles

Cteniopus is a genus of comb-clawed beetles belonging to the family Tenebrionidae subfamily Alleculinae.

== Species ==
- Cteniopus impressicollis Fairmaire, 1892
- Cteniopus intrusus Seidlitz, 1896
- Cteniopus neapolitanus Baudi, 1877
- Cteniopus punctatissimus Baudi, 1877
- Cteniopus sulphureus (Linnaeus, 1758)
- Cteniopus sulphuripes (Germar, 1824)
