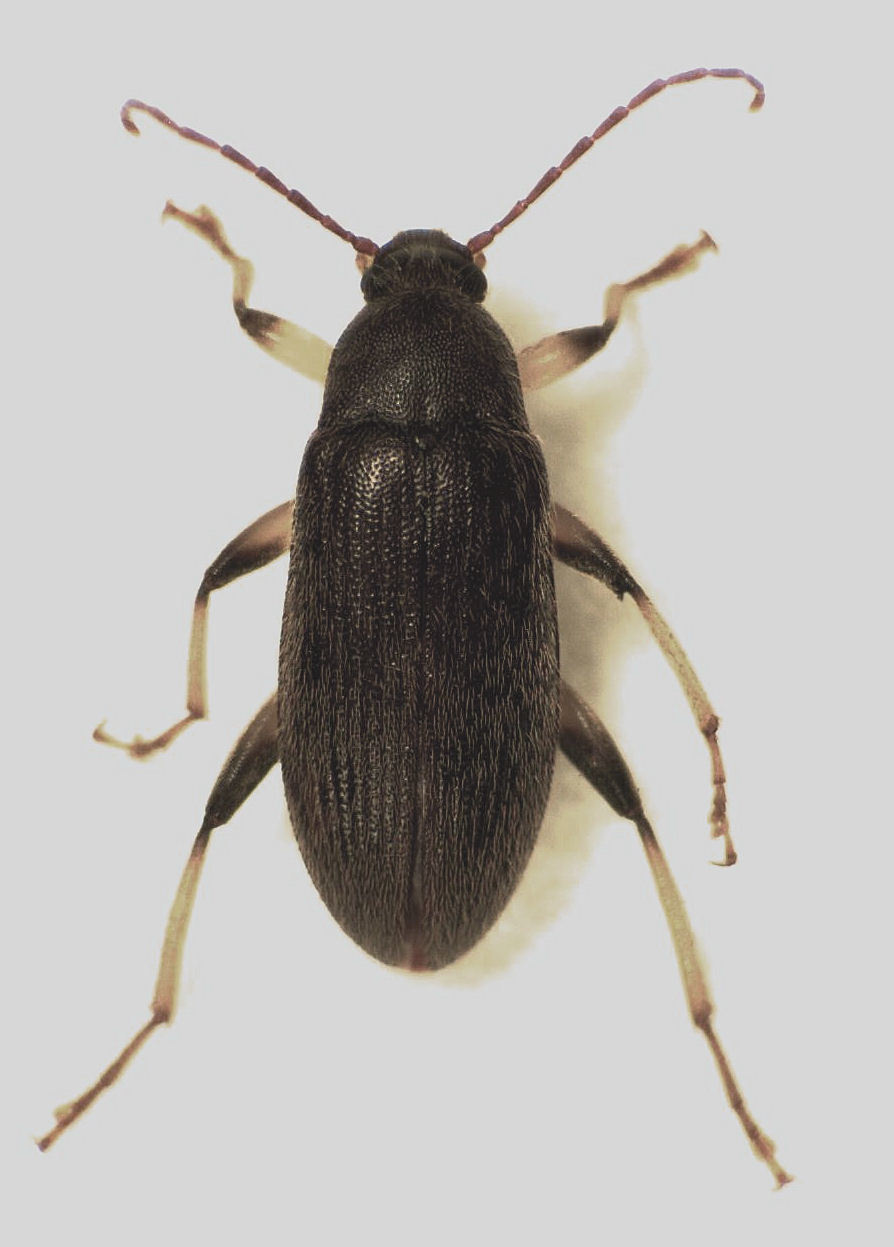
- Homotrysis macleayi

Scientific classification
- Kingdom: Animalia
- Phylum: Arthropoda
- Class: Insecta
- Order: Coleoptera
- Suborder: Polyphaga
- Infraorder: Cucujiformia
- Family: Tenebrionidae
- Subfamily: Alleculinae
- Genus: Homotrysis; Pascoe, 1866

Species
- See Text

= Homotrysis =

Genus of beetles

Homotrysis is a genus of darkling beetles, described by Francis Polkinghorne Pascoe in 1866. Species include Homotrysis macleayi.
