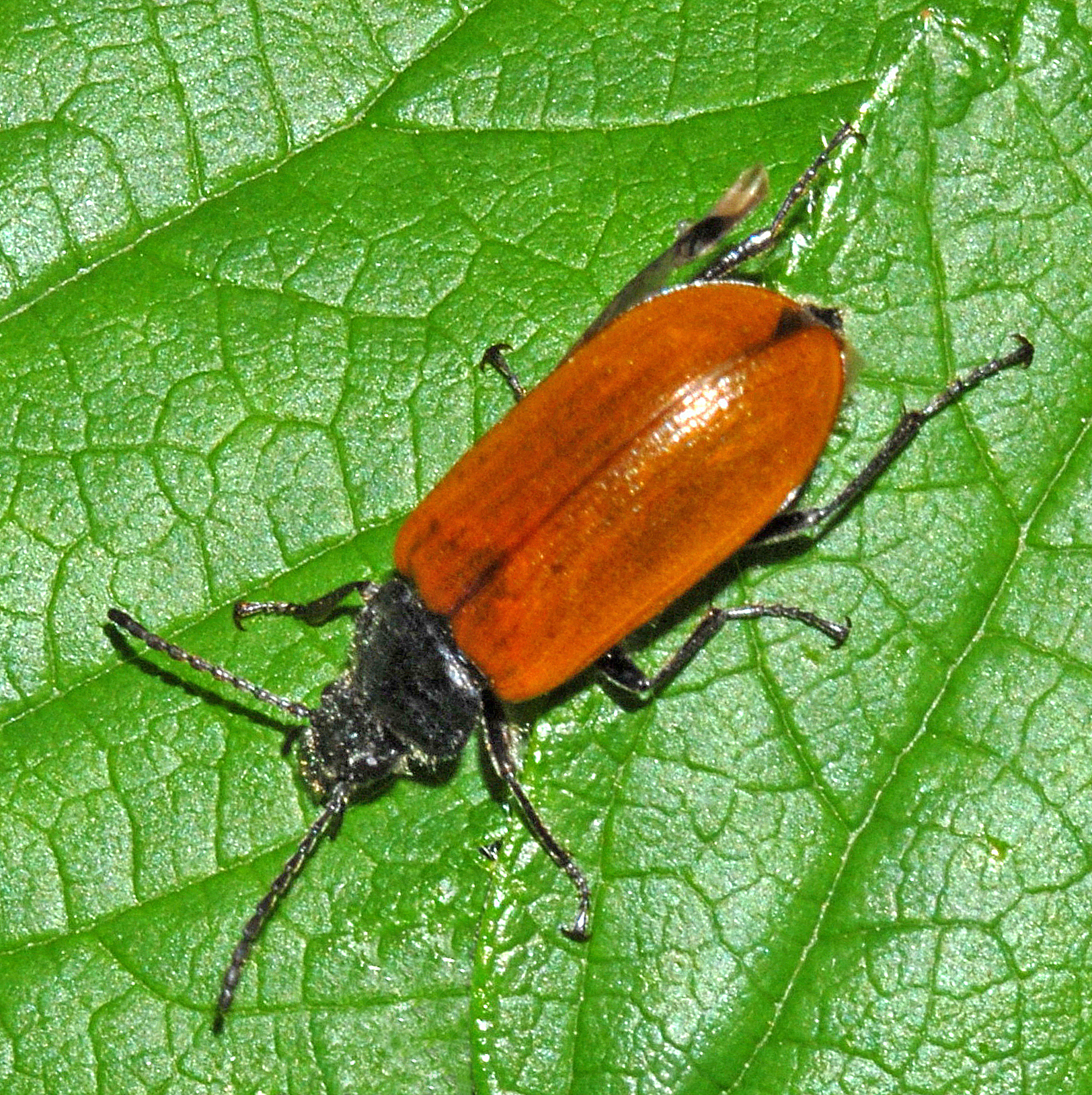
- Omophlus lepturoides

Scientific classification
- Kingdom: Animalia
- Phylum: Arthropoda
- Class: Insecta
- Order: Coleoptera
- Suborder: Polyphaga
- Infraorder: Cucujiformia
- Family: Tenebrionidae
- Subfamily: Alleculinae
- Genus: Omophlus; Solier, 1835

= Omophlus =

Genus of beetles

Omophlus is a genus of comb-clawed beetles belonging to the family Tenebrionidae subfamily Alleculinae.

== Species ==
Species within this genus include:

- Omophlus agrapha Reitter, 1890
- Omophlus anatolicus Reitter, 1906
- Omophlus atticus Reitter, 1906
- Omophlus baudueri Baudi di Selve, 1877
- Omophlus blumenthali Muche, 1979
- Omophlus bodemeyeri Reitter, 1906
- Omophlus brullei Kirsh, 1869
- Omophlus candiota Obenberger, 1916
- Omophlus caucasicus Kirsh, 1869
- Omophlus compressus Seidlitz, 1896
- Omophlus crinifer Seidlitz, 1896
- Omophlus curtus Küster, 1850
- Omophlus dispar A. Costa, 1847
- Omophlus dubitatus Reitter, 1906
- Omophlus emgei Reitter, 1891
- Omophlus fallaciosus Rottenberg, 1870
- Omophlus flavipennis Küster, 1850
- Omophlus glamocensis Obenberger, 1916
- Omophlus hirsutus Seidlitz, 1869
- Omophlus hirtus Seidlitz, 1896
- Omophlus infirmus Kirsch, 1869
- Omophlus kurda Znojko, 1950
- Omophlus laciniatus Seidlitz, 1896
- Omophlus laevigatus Seidlitz, 1896
- Omophlus lepturoides (Fabricius, 1787)
- Omophlus lividipes Mulsant, 1856
- Omophlus longicornis Bertolini, 1868
- Omophlus lucidus Kirsch, 1869
- Omophlus luciolus Seidlitz, 1896
- Omophlus melitensis Baudi, 1877
- Omophlus nigrinus Reitter, 1889
- Omophlus nitidicollis Seidlitz, 1896
- Omophlus oblongus Znojko, 1950
- Omophlus obscurus Reitter, 1890
- Omophlus ochraceipennis Faldermann, 1837
- Omophlus orientalis Mulsant, 1856
- Omophlus picipes (Fabricius, 1792)
- Omophlus pilicollis (Ménétriès, 1832)
- Omophlus pilosellus Kirsch, 1869
- Omophlus pollinosus Znojko, 1950
- Omophlus propagatus Kirsch, 1869
- Omophlus proteus Kirsch, 1869
- Omophlus pruinosus Reitter, 1890
- Omophlus pubescens (Linnaeus, 1758)
- Omophlus rugosicollis (Brullé, 1832)
- Omophlus sandneri Reitter, 1906
- Omophlus subalpinus (Ménétriès, 1832)
- Omophlus sulcipleuris Seidlitz, 1896
- Omophlus svaneticus Znojko, 1950
- Omophlus syriacus Mulsant, 1856
- Omophlus turcicus Kirsch, 1869
