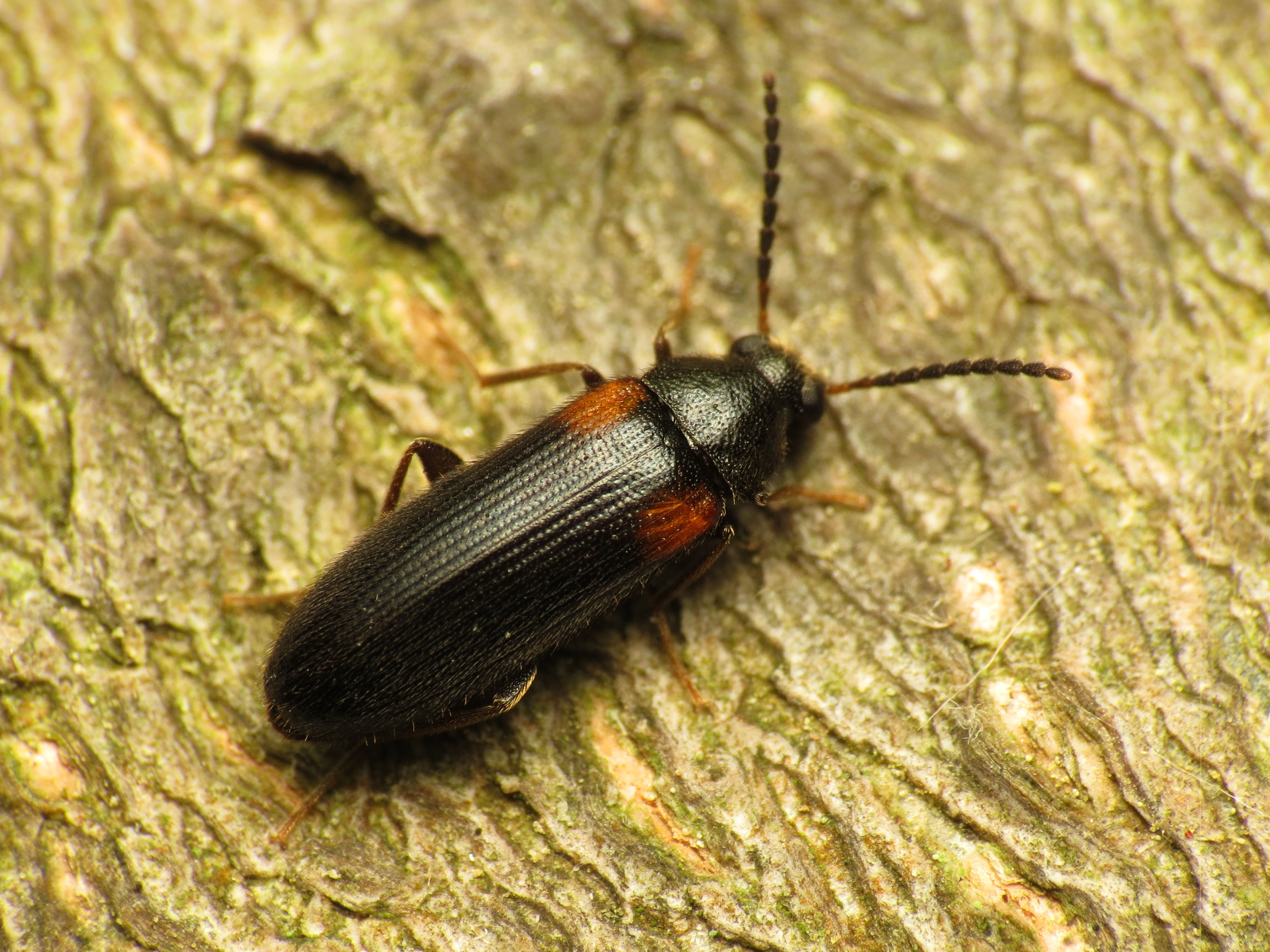

Scientific classification
- Kingdom: Animalia
- Phylum: Arthropoda
- Clade: Pancrustacea
- Class: Insecta
- Order: Coleoptera
- Suborder: Polyphaga
- Infraorder: Cucujiformia
- Family: Tenebrionidae
- Genus: Mycetochara
- Species: M. binotata

Binomial name
- Mycetochara binotata (Say, 1824)

= Mycetochara binotata =

Species of beetle

Mycetochara binotata is a species of comb-clawed beetle in the family Tenebrionidae.

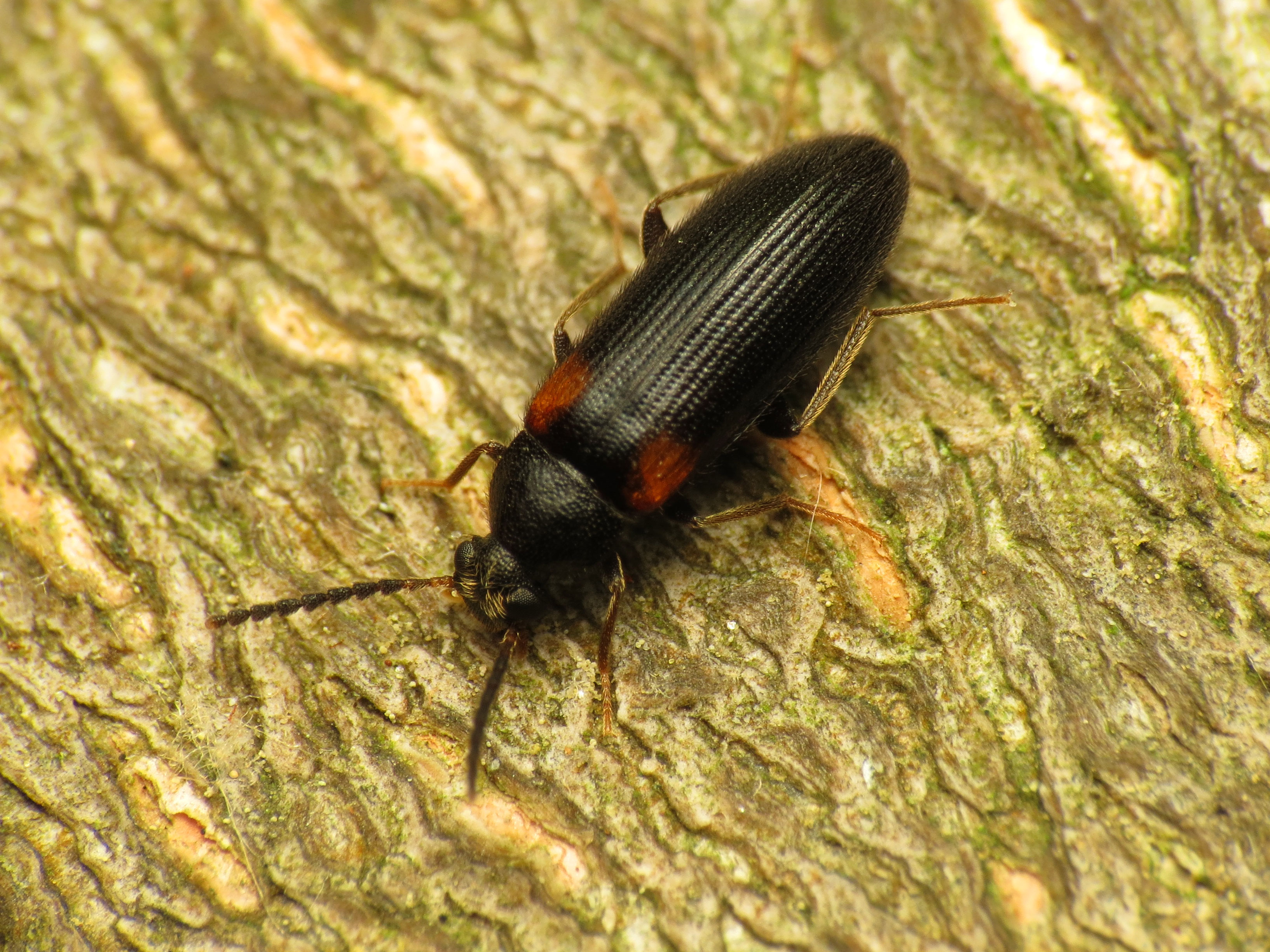

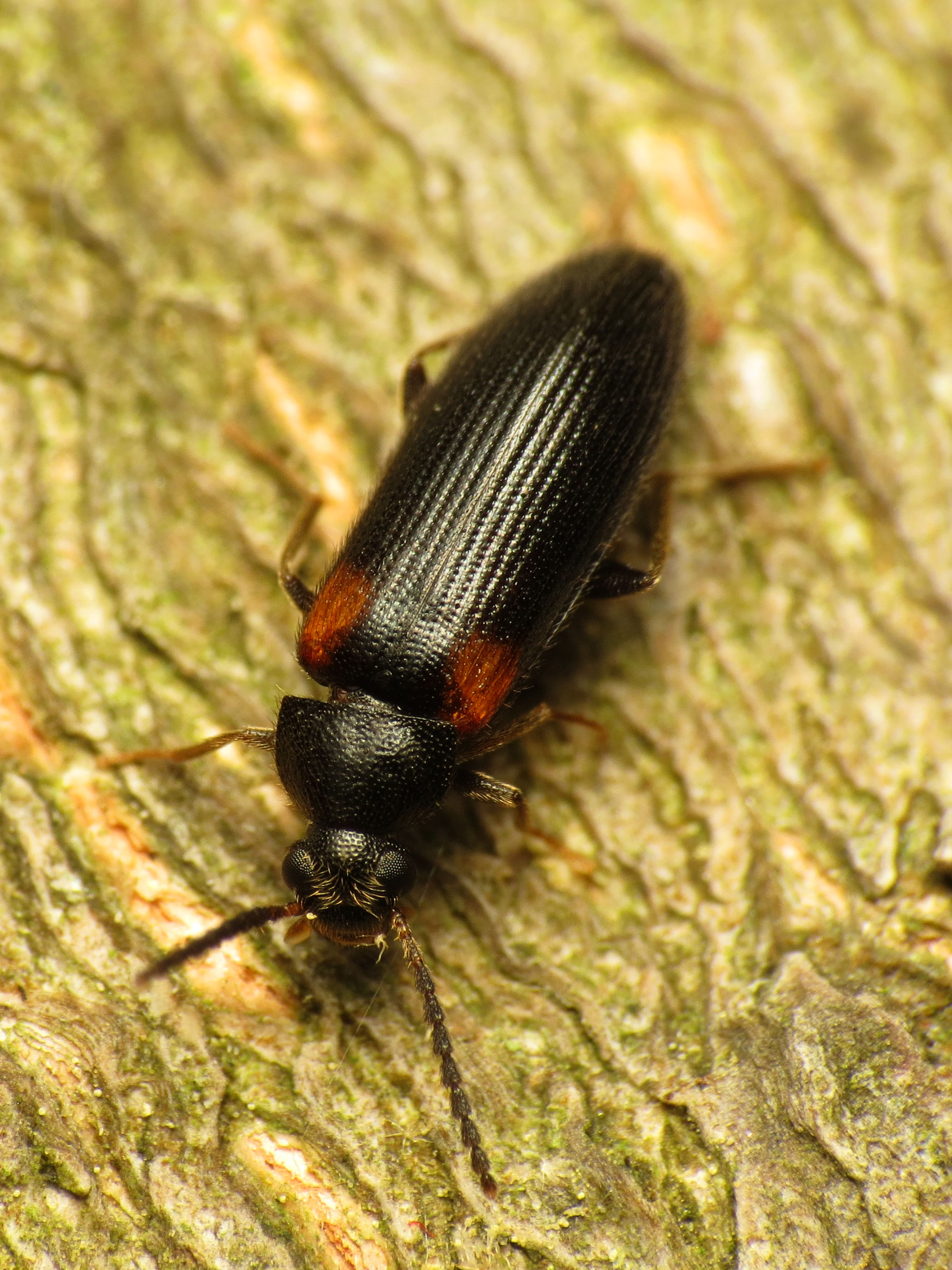
