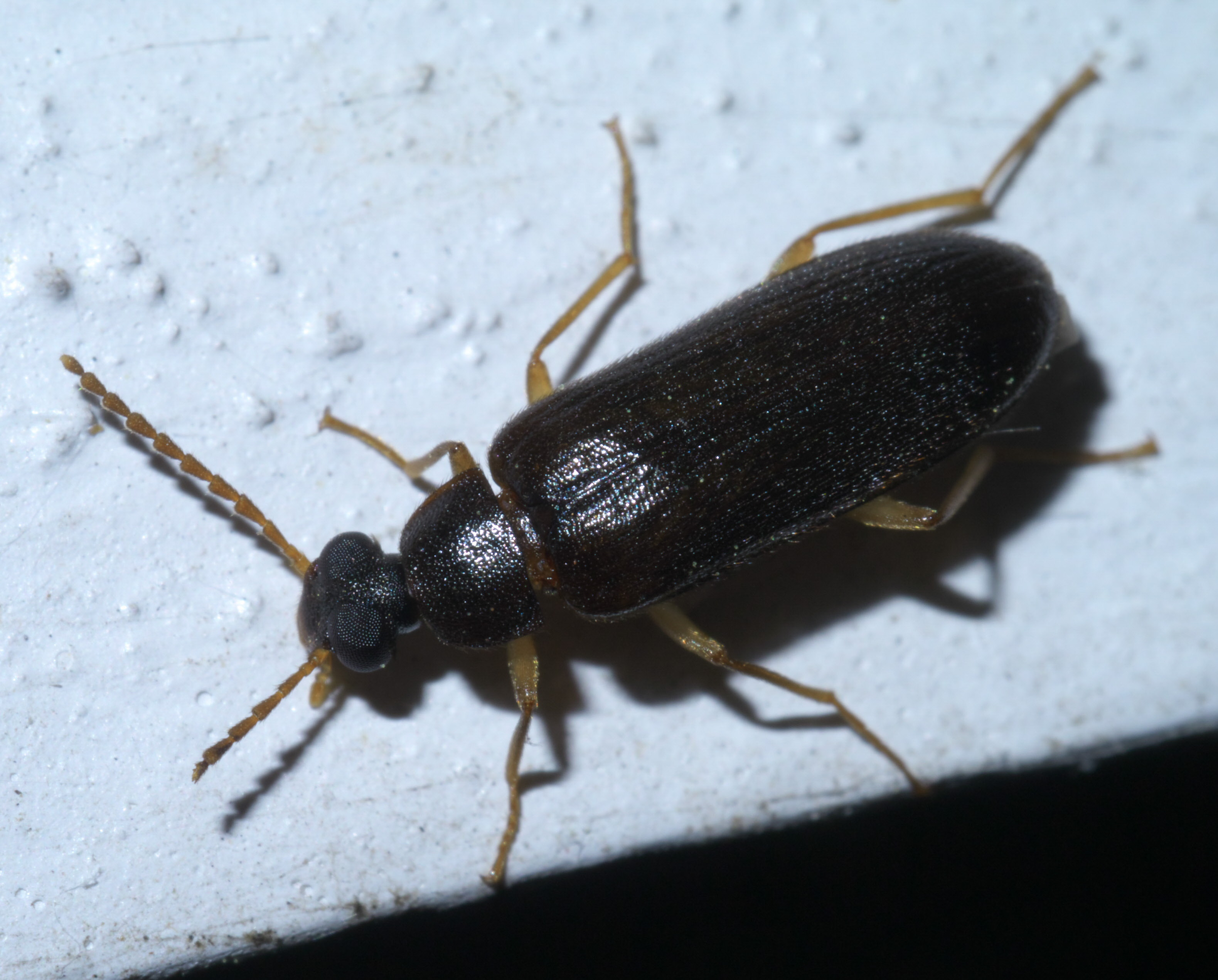

Scientific classification
- Domain: Eukaryota
- Kingdom: Animalia
- Phylum: Arthropoda
- Class: Insecta
- Order: Coleoptera
- Suborder: Polyphaga
- Infraorder: Cucujiformia
- Family: Tenebrionidae
- Subtribe: Mycetocharina
- Genus: Mycetochara; Berthold, 1827

= Mycetochara =

Genus of beetles

Mycetochara is a genus of comb-clawed beetles in the family Tenebrionidae. There are at least 30 described species in Mycetochara.

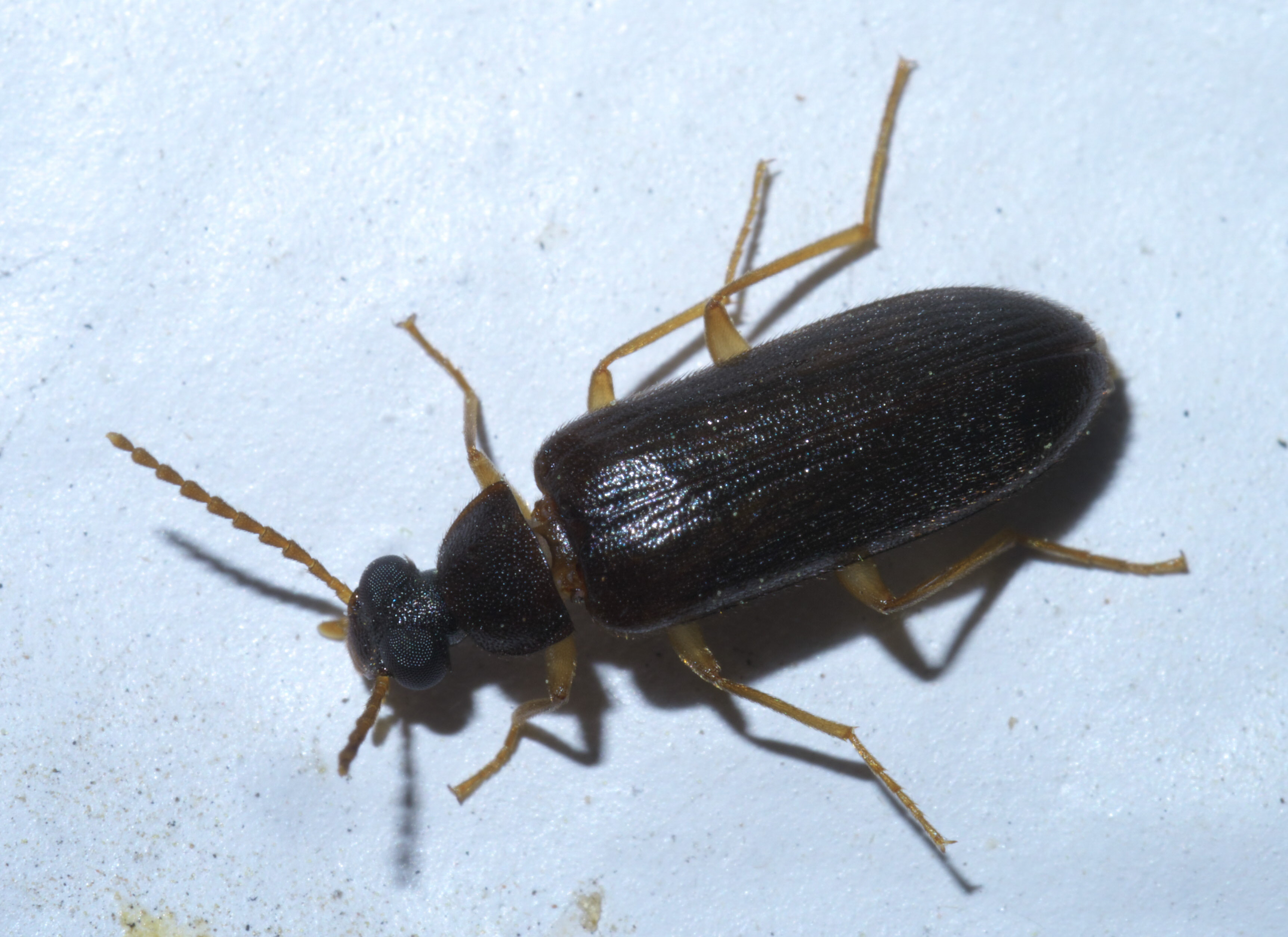

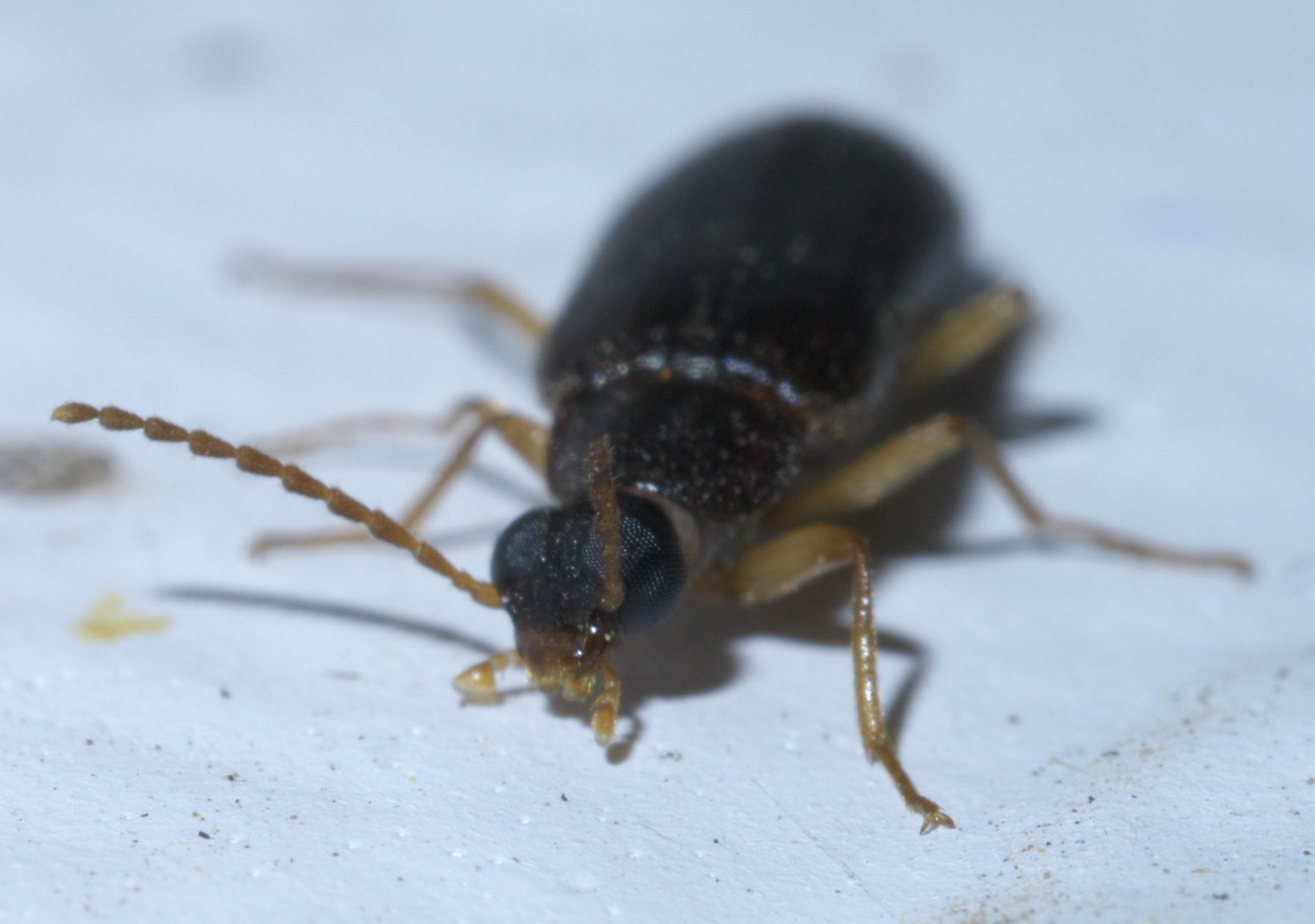

== Species ==
These 32 species belong to the genus Mycetochara:

- Mycetochara analis (LeConte, 1878)^{g}
- Mycetochara axillaris (Paykull, 1799)^{g}
- Mycetochara bicolor (Couper, 1865)^{g b}
- Mycetochara binotata (Say, 1824)^{g b}
- Mycetochara brenskei Seidlitz, 1896^{g}
- Mycetochara excelsa Reitter, 1884^{g}
- Mycetochara flavicornis (Miller, 1883)^{g}
- Mycetochara flavipennis Reitter, 1908^{g}
- Mycetochara flavipes (Fabricius, 1793)^{g}
- Mycetochara foveata (LeConte, 1866)^{g b}
- Mycetochara fraterna (Say, 1824)^{g b}
- Mycetochara graciliformis Reitter, 1899^{g}
- Mycetochara gracilis (Faldermann, 1837)^{g}
- Mycetochara haldemani LeConte, 1866^{b}
- Mycetochara humeralis (Fabricius, 1787)^{g}
- Mycetochara jonica (Obenberger, 1916)^{g}
- Mycetochara linearis (Illiger, 1794)^{g}
- Mycetochara maura (Fabricius, 1792)^{g}
- Mycetochara myrmecophila (Obenberger, 1916)^{g}
- Mycetochara netolitzkyi (Penecke, 1912)^{g}
- Mycetochara obscura (Zetterstedt, 1838)^{g}
- Mycetochara ocularis Reitter, 1884^{g}
- Mycetochara procera Casey, 1891^{g}
- Mycetochara pygmaea (Redtenbacher, 1874)^{g}
- Mycetochara quadrimaculata (Latreille, 1804)^{g}
- Mycetochara retowskyi (Reitter, 1889)^{g}
- Mycetochara roubali Maran, 1935^{g}
- Mycetochara rudis (Kuster, 1850)^{g}
- Mycetochara ruficollis Baudi, 1877^{g}
- Mycetochara scutellaris (Baudi, 1877)^{g}
- Mycetochara sulcipennis Reitter, 1896^{g}
- Mycetochara thoracica (Gredler, 1854)^{g}

Data sources: i = ITIS, c = Catalogue of Life, g = GBIF, b = Bugguide.net
