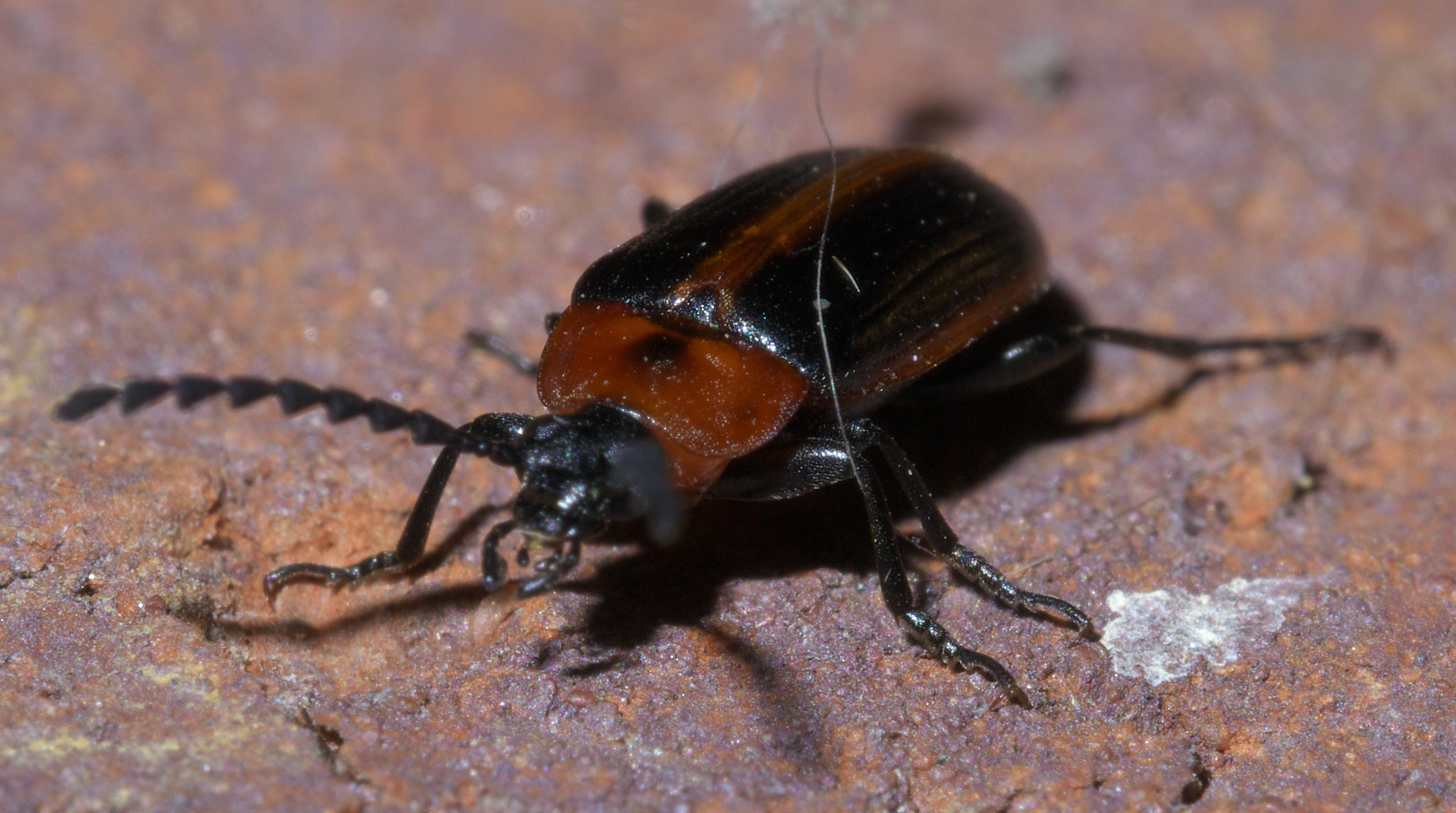

Scientific classification
- Kingdom: Animalia
- Phylum: Arthropoda
- Clade: Pancrustacea
- Class: Insecta
- Order: Coleoptera
- Suborder: Polyphaga
- Infraorder: Cucujiformia
- Family: Tenebrionidae
- Genus: Chromatia; LeConte, 1862
- Species: C. amoena

Binomial name
- Chromatia amoena (Say, 1824)

= Chromatia =

Genus of insects

Chromatia is a genus of darkling beetles in the family Tenebrionidae. There is one described species in Chromatia, C. amoena.
