= Prionychus =

Scientific classification
- Kingdom: Animalia
- Phylum: Arthropoda
- Class: Insecta
- Order: Coleoptera
- Suborder: Polyphaga
- Infraorder: Cucujiformia
- Family: Tenebrionidae
- Genus: Prionychus; Solier, 1835

Genus of beetles

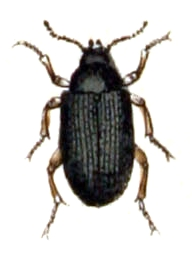

Prionychus is a genus of beetles belonging to the family Tenebrionidae.

The species of this genus are found in Europe.

Species:

- Prionychus asiatica Fairmaire, 1892
- Prionychus ater (Fabricius, 1775)
