= Gonodera =

Scientific classification
- Domain: Eukaryota
- Kingdom: Animalia
- Phylum: Arthropoda
- Class: Insecta
- Order: Coleoptera
- Suborder: Polyphaga
- Infraorder: Cucujiformia
- Family: Tenebrionidae
- Genus: Gonodera; Mulsant, 1856

Genus of beetles

Gonodera is a genus of beetles belonging to the family Tenebrionidae.

The species of this genus are found in Europe.

Species:

- Gonodera antiqua (Wickham, 1913)
- Gonodera baygushevae Nabozhenko & Chigray, 2018
