= Alleculini =

Scientific classification
- Kingdom: Animalia
- Phylum: Arthropoda
- Class: Insecta
- Order: Coleoptera
- Suborder: Polyphaga
- Infraorder: Cucujiformia
- Family: Tenebrionidae
- Subfamily: Alleculinae
- Tribe: Alleculini; Laporte, 1840

Tribe of beetles

Alleculini is a tribe of comb-clawed beetles.

== Taxonomy ==
Alleculini contains the following genera:

- Omedes
- Nocar
- Hybrenia
- Nypsius
- Melaps
- Zomedes
- Alleculina
- Bratyna
- Notocistela
- Mycetocharina
- Xystropodina
- Gonoderina
