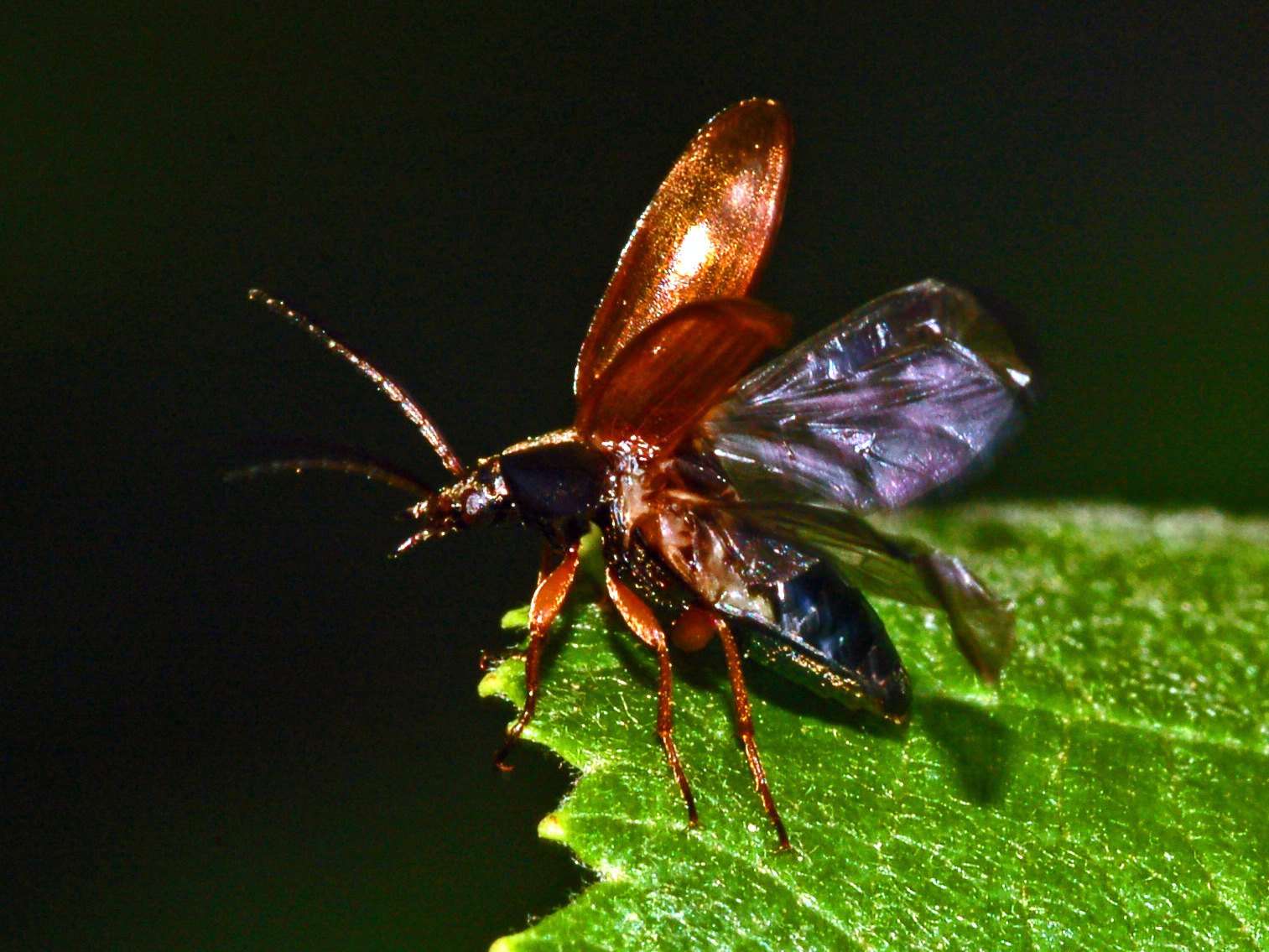
- Isomira sp.

Scientific classification
- Domain: Eukaryota
- Kingdom: Animalia
- Phylum: Arthropoda
- Class: Insecta
- Order: Coleoptera
- Suborder: Polyphaga
- Infraorder: Cucujiformia
- Family: Tenebrionidae
- Subfamily: Alleculinae; Laporte de Castelnau, 1840

Tribes
- Alleculini Laporte, 1840; Cteniopodini Solier, 1835

Diversity
- at least 230 genera

Synonyms
- Cistelidae (Latreille) Kirby, 1837; Cistelides Latreille, 1825; Cistelinae; Cteniopodinae; Omophlinae; Pectinipèdes Mulsant, 1856; Xystropodinae

= Alleculinae =

Subfamily of beetles

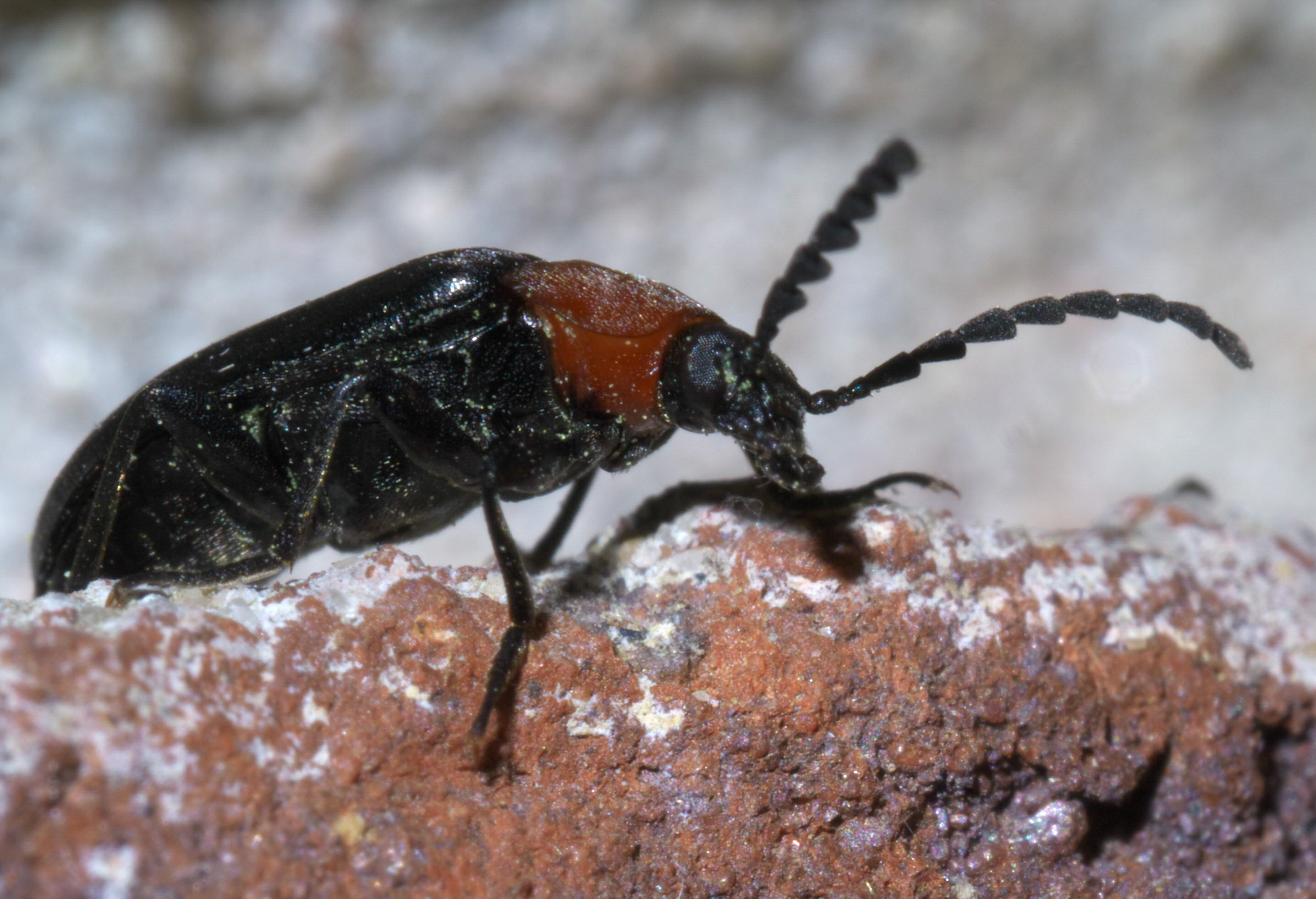
Pseudocistela amoena

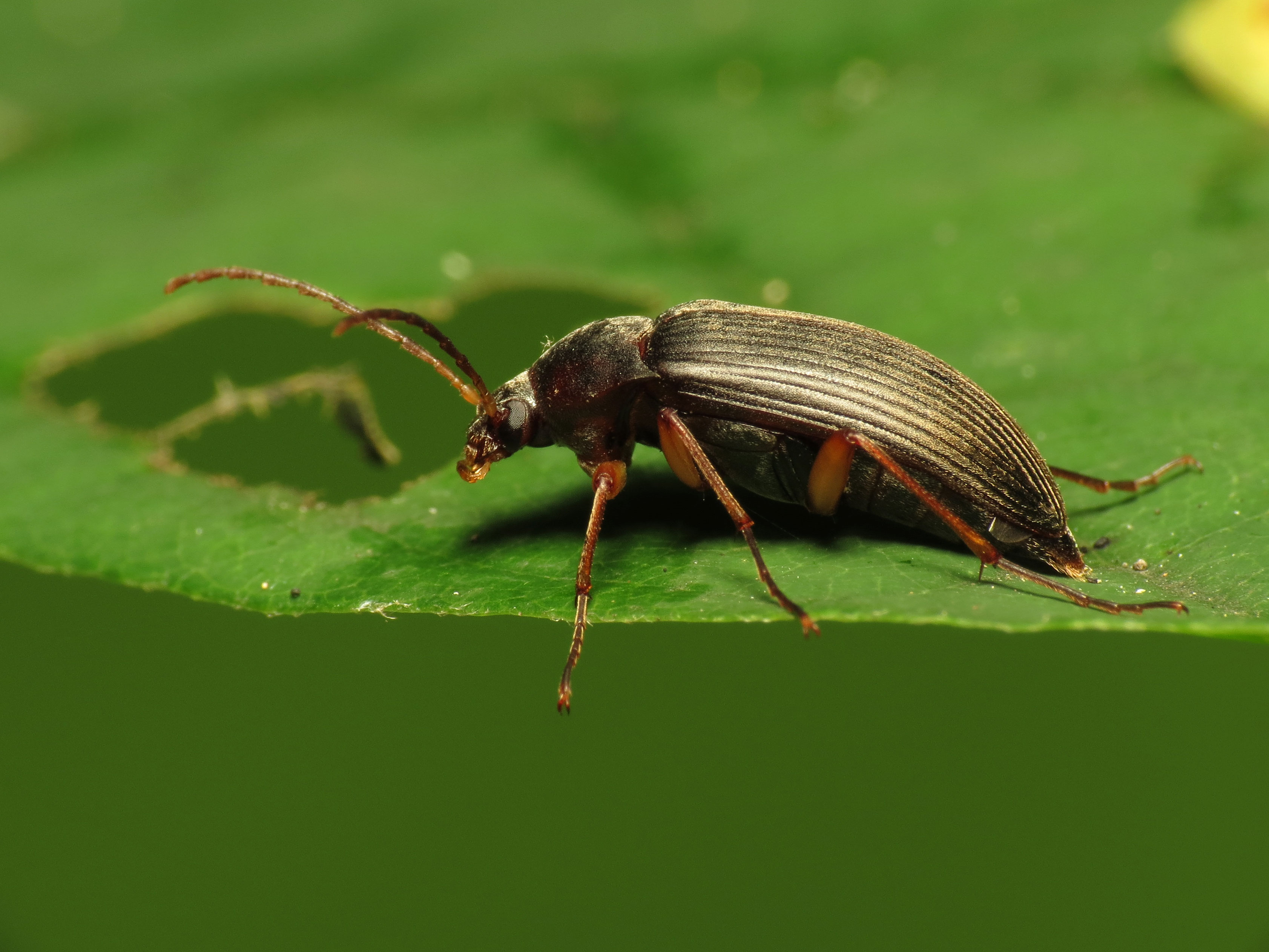
Androchirus erythropus

Alleculinae is a subfamily of comb-clawed beetles belonging to the family Tenebrionidae. These beetles are characterized by an oval body, threadlike antennae, relatively long legs and tarsi quite elongated. Their most striking feature, however, are the combed claws of the hind tarsi, that show fine teeth.

There are more than 230 genera in Alleculinae found worldwide, separated into the two tribes Alleculini and Cteniopodini.

== See also ==
- List of Alleculinae genera
