= Geography of Malta =

Island in Europe

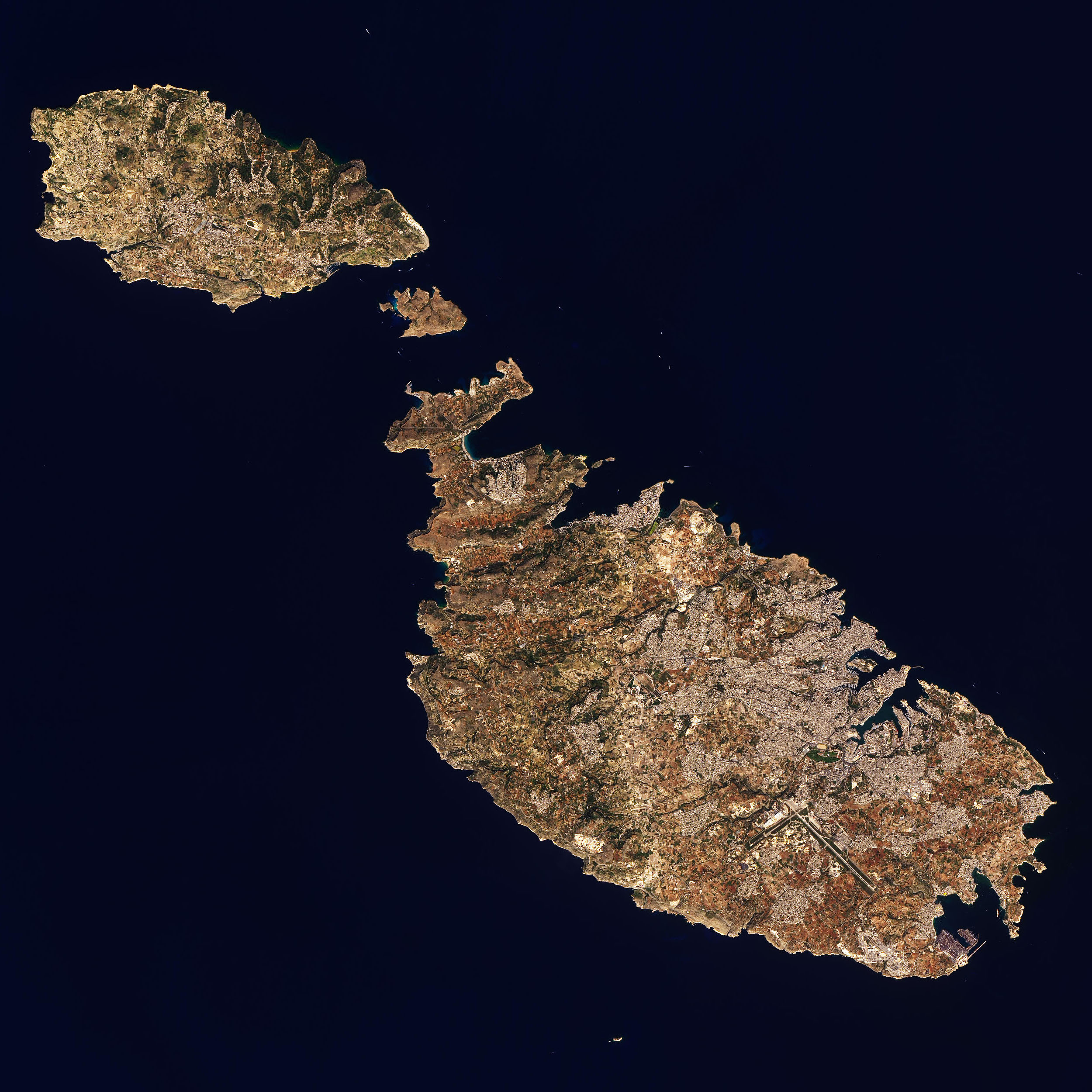
- Satellite image of Malta

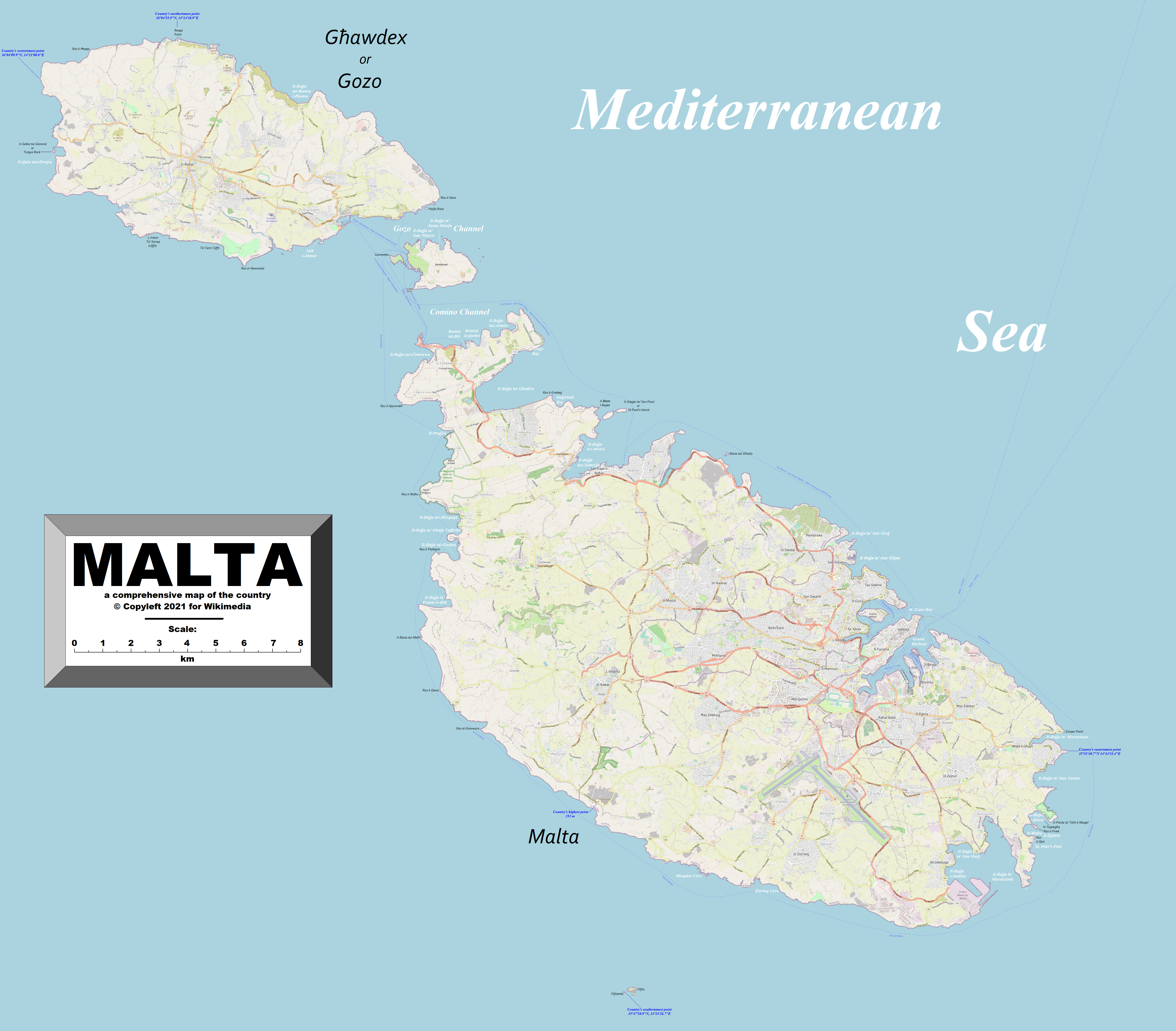
- Continent: Europe
- Region: Southern Europe
- Coordinates: 35°54′N 14°31′E
- Area: Ranked 186th
  - Total: 316 km^{2} (122 sq mi)
  - Land: 100%
  - Water: 0%
- Highest point: Ta' Dmejrek
- Lowest point: Mediterranean Sea

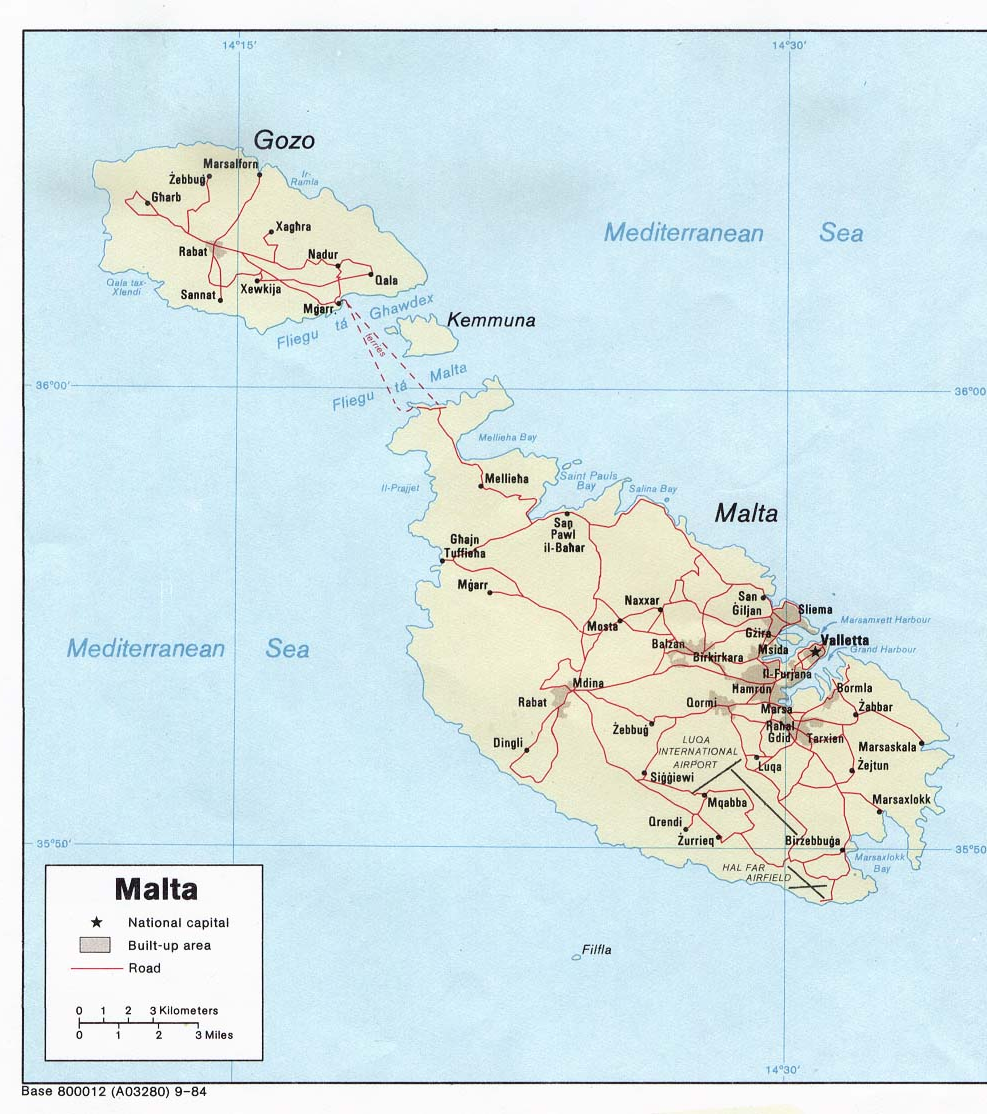

The geography of Malta is dominated by water. Malta is an archipelago of coralline limestone, located in Southern Europe, but like most of Sicily sits on the African tectonic plate in the Mediterranean Sea. Malta is 81 kilometres (50 mi) south of Sicily, Italy, and nearly 300 km (190 mi) north (Libya) and northeast (Tunisia) of Africa. Although Malta is located farther south than Tunis and some other cities in North Africa, it is not the Southernmost point of Europe. Only the three largest islands – Malta, Gozo and Comino – are inhabited. Other (uninhabited) islands are: Cominotto, Filfla and the St Paul's Island. The country is approximately 316 km^{2} (122 sq mi) in area. Numerous bays along the indented coastline of the islands provide harbours. The landscape of the islands is characterised by high hills with terraced fields. The capital is Valletta.

== Surface: statistics ==
Malta has a total area of 315.718 km^{2} (121.899 sq mi) with land making up all of that and water taking up zero area. Compared to other political entities, this makes Malta, in comparison with

- Australia: slightly less than one-seventh the Australian Capital Territory's size;
- Canada: roughly one-eighteenth of Prince Edward Island's size;
- UK: slightly smaller than the Isle of Wight;
- US: slightly less than twice the size of Washington, DC.

Excluding 56 km (35 mi) from the island of Gozo, Malta has a coastline of 196.8 km (122.3 mi). Its maritime claims of territorial sea are 12 nmi (22.2 km; 13.8 mi), contiguous zone is 24 nmi (44.4 km; 27.6 mi), continental shelf is 200 m (660 ft) depth or to the depth of exploitation, and Malta's exclusive fishing zone spans 25 nmi (46.3 km; 28.8 mi).

== Islands ==
Name	Area	Note/ coordinates	Image
Malta Island	246 km^{2} (95 sq mi)	35°52′55″N 14°26′57″E	
Gozo (Għawdex)	67.1 km^{2} (25.9 sq mi)	36°02′58″N 14°15′00″E	
Comino (Kemmuna)	2.8 km^{2} (1.1 sq mi)	36°00′44″N 14°20′12″E	
Manoel Island (Il-Gżira Manoel)	0.3 km^{2} (0.12 sq mi)	35°54′14″N 14°30′07″E	
St Paul's Islands (Il-Gżejjer ta' San Pawl)	0.101 km^{2} (0.039 sq mi)	35°57′55″N 14°24′2″E	
Cominotto (Kemmunett)	0.099 km^{2} (0.038 sq mi)	36°00′49″N 14°19′10″E	
Filfla (and Filfoletta)	0.020 km^{2} (0.0077 sq mi)	35°47′15″N 14°24′37″E	
Fungus Rock (Il-Ġebla tal-Ġeneral)	0.007 km^{2} (0.0027 sq mi)	36°02′49″N 14°11′20″E	
Ħalfa Rock (Il-Ġebla tal-Ħalfa)	0.0050 km^{2} (0.0019 sq mi)	36°01′45″N 14°19′51″E Situated near Gozo. In the island there is a 4-to-5-metre (13 to 16 ft) deep water rock pool just 2 metres (6 ft 7 in) above sea level, possibly man made due to its perfectly round shape. There is also an underground fresh water system which emerges from a small cave. Most of the plants occurs on the western part of the island. Crucianella rupestris, Arthrocnemum macrostachyum, Lygeum spartum, Convolvulus oleifolius, Thymbra capitata, Teucrium fruticans, Allium melitense, Anacamptis urvilleana, Bromus madritensis, Capparis spinosa, Echium parviflorum, Pallenis spinosa, Plantago lagopus, Trachynia distachya, Urginea pancration.	
Old Battery's Rock (Ġebla ta' taħt il-Batterija)		Situated on the southeast of Comino. Flora consisted of 22 individuals of Inula crithmoides (2010).	
Lantern Point Rock (Ġebla Tal-Ponta Rqiqa)		Situated near Comino. Two species of plants live here: Limonium melitense and Inula crithmoides. It has a height of 7 metres (23 ft).	
Large Blue Lagoon Rock		In island, there is a cave. Species of plants: Hypericium aegypticum, Daucus carota, Convolvulus oleifolius, Darniella melitensis, Arthrocnemum macrostachyum, Senecio bicolor.	
Small Blue Lagoon Rocks		Situated between Large Blue Lagoon and Cominotto. Species of plants: Arthrocnemum macrostachyum, Daucus carota, Lygeum spartum, Lavatera arborea.	
Devil's End Rock (Il-Ġebla tax-Xifer l-Infern)		Situated near main island, Delimara point.	
Għallis Rocks		35°57′13″N 14°26′46″E	
Taċ-Ċawl Rock (Il-Ġebla taċ-Ċawl)		36°01′34″N 14°18′57″E Situated near Gozo. The flora consisted of Lygeum spartum, Asphodelus aestivus, Crithmum maritimum, Cichorium spinosum, Crucianella rupestrisis, Opuntia, Thymbra capitata, Euphorbia melitensis, Foeniculum vulgare, Allium commutatum, Allium lajoconoi, Bromus madritensis, Capparis spinosa, Gynandriris sisirynchium, Pistacia lentiscus, Phagnalon graceum, Sedum litoreum, Sonchus tenerrimus, Trachynia distachya, Valantia muralis.	
Cheirolophus Rock (Ħaġra tas-Sajjetta)		Situated near main island. It is 9 to 12 metres (30 to 39 ft) high at its highest point. Species of plants: Darniella melitensis, Crithmum maritimum, Cheirolophus crassifolius, Inula crithmoides, Limonium virgatum, Daucus carota, Cheirolophus crassifolius.	
Barbaganni Rock		Situated near Gozo. No soil exists on the islet because the island is inundated by water wave action during rough weather. The flora consisted of only 14 individuals of Inula crithmoides (2010).	
Crocodile Rock & Bear rocks (Il-Ġebla tal-Baqra u il-Ġebel tal-Orsijiet)		Near Gozo, three rocks in total.	
Qawra Point (Ta' Fra Ben islet, Il-Ponta jew Ras il- Qawra)		Situated near main island. The western part is littered with small boulders, while much of the vegetation occurs in the middle part of the islet. In island there is sea cave occurs as a big hole in the middle of the islet. Species of plants: Arthrocnemum macrostachyum, Anthemis urvilleana, Inula crithmoides, Lotus cystisoides, Limonium, Sporbolus pungens.	
Comino Cliff Face Rock (Ta' Taħt il-Mazz Rock)		Situated near Comino. The island is very steep - cliffs. The majority of species of plants occur on its west side, while only one species of plant inhabits its east side. Species of plants: Matthiola incana, Inula crithmoides, Darniella melitensis, Daucus carota, Limonium melitensis, Anthyllis hermanniae, Pistacia lentiscus.	
Xrobb l-Għaġin Rock (It-Taqtiegħa)			
Fessej Rock (Il-Ġebla tal-Fessej)			
Għemieri Rocks (L-iskolli tal-Għemieri)			
Ħnejja Rocks (Ġebel tal-Ħnejja)			
White Rock / Blue Islets (Rocks) (Ġebla tal-Għar Qawqla)		36°04′27″N 14°15′45″E	

== Geology ==
The geology of Malta consists of a sequence of sedimentary rocks of late Oligocene to late Miocene age cut through by a set of extensional faults of Pliocene age. The sequence is divided into five formations, from the oldest, the Lower Coralline Limestone, followed by the Globigerina Limestone, the Blue Clay and the youngest unit, the Upper Coralline Limestone.

== Seascape ==
The seabed surrounding Malta's islands retains traces of ancient geomarine features, suggesting potential archaeological discoveries that could shed light on the region's prehistoric environment. The shelf is narrower south of the archipelago and wider on its northern side, with swaths of seagrass close to shore and maerl in the outer part of the shelf. These form belts are regulated by the availability of light and intensity of currents.

== Climate ==
Mediterranean with mild, rainy winters and hot, dry summers.

== Elevation extremes ==
The lowest point is the Mediterranean Sea at 0 m (0 ft) and the highest point is Ta' Dmejrek at 253 m (830 ft).

== Land use ==
- Arable land: 28.12%
- Permanent crops: 4.06%
- Other: 67.81% (2011)

=== Irrigated land ===
32 km^{2} (12 sq mi) (2007)

=== Total renewable water resources ===
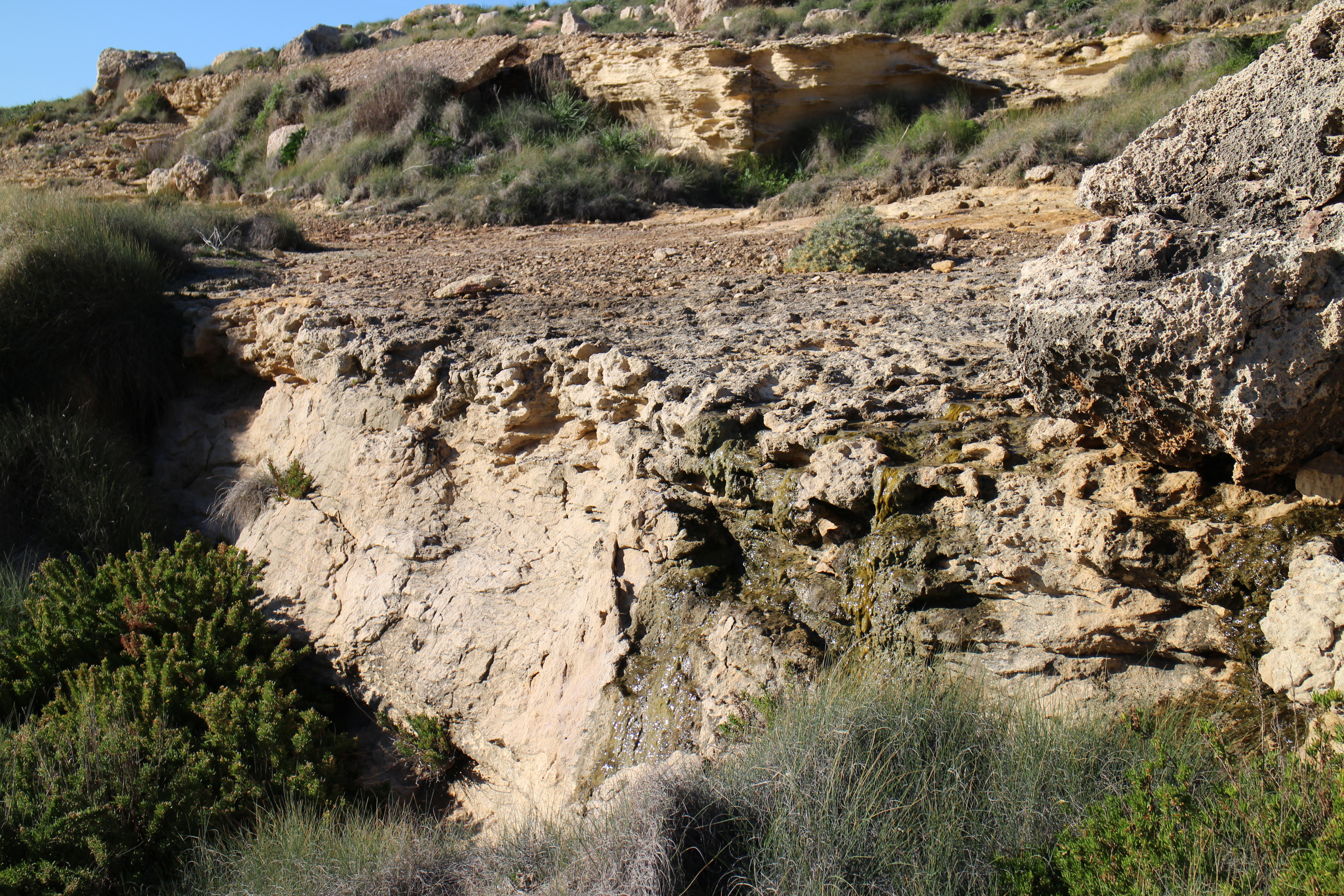
A fresh-water spring, Għajn Bierda, at Ras ir-Raħeb

0.05 km^{3} (0.012 cu mi) (2011)

== Environment ==
=== Current issues ===
According to Eurostat, in 2023, 34.7% of Maltese households reported being affected by pollution, grime, or other environmental nuisances, making Malta the nation with the highest percentage in the European Union for that year and more than double the EU average of 12.2%. The rate has been increasing steadily from 26.5% in 2017 and highlights several issues: traffic-related emissions, dust from road or building works, garbage waiting to be collected, rodent and cockroach infestations, sea slime during the summer months, noise pollution, a lack of greenery and illegal dumping.

In 2023, Malta recorded an annual average PM2.5 concentration of 12 micrograms per cubic metre, more than double the number of fine-particle pollutants recommended by World Health Organization (WHO) guidelines. The WHO guidelines are 5 micrograms per cubic meter. The World Air Quality Report 2023 by IQAir ranked Malta 49th out of 134 countries (best to worst) for PM2.5 concentration, while among European countries, Malta ranked 26th when ordered from best to worst air quality. Fine particles include contaminants like sulphates, black carbon, nitrates, and ammonium, specifically those measuring 2.5 millionths of a meter, approximately one-fiftieth the diameter of human hair. These little particles, despite their size, can significantly harm human health since they are readily absorbed into the lungs and bloodstream, resulting in conditions such as asthma, cancer, strokes, and lung disease, and have been associated with automobile use and construction, among other contributors. From 2011 to 2021, the number of residences in Malta increased from about 224,000 to over 297,000, representing a growth of roughly one-third, exceeding the population's rise. The quantity of automobiles in Malta has persistently risen, currently exceeding 420,000, with approximately 30 new vehicles being introduced daily. Official data from the National Statistics Office reveals that there are more than 18,000 automobiles per square kilometre of road and 1,500 cars for every 1,000 individuals.

Limited natural fresh water resources; increasing reliance on desalination. A 2021 study assessed the impact of climate change on the groundwater resources of the Maltese Islands, simulating the combined effects of sea-level rise, reduced groundwater recharge, and increased water demand on Malta’s mean sea-level aquifer up to the year 2100. The model was calibrated using observed hydraulic data from 1944, 1990, and 2014. The results indicated that rising water demand and decreasing recharge are the dominant drivers of groundwater decline, while sea-level rise has a relatively minor direct effect over the study period. In the worst-case scenarios, freshwater storage could fall by more than 16% by 2100. Localised overextraction, particularly in southeastern Malta, was shown to accelerate saltwater intrusion, posing a risk of contamination.

Since 2016, the network of Mediterranean Experts on Climate and Environmental Change (MedECC) supported by the Union for the Mediterranean and Plan Bleu (UN Environment/MAP Regional Activity Centre), has been assessing the risks associated with climate and environmental changes in the Mediterranean. They indicate the average annual air temperatures have risen by around 1.5 °C compared to the preindustrial era, significantly more than the current global warming trend of +1.1 °C, with projections of 2.2 °C by 2040 and more than 3.8 °C by 2100.

Surface seawater temperature was found to have risen by approximately 0.4 °C every decade. The forecasts for 2100 range from +1.8 °C to +3.5 °C compared to the period between 1961 and 1990. Sea levels have risen approximately 3 mm annually over recent decades, while the future global mean sea level is projected to range from 52 to 190 cm by 2100, resulting in increased coastal threats associated with rising sea levels, storm surges, and flooding. Seawater acidification, primarily caused by the sea absorbing excess carbon dioxide (CO2) from the atmosphere together with increased temperatures, adversely affects carbonate shells and skeletons. Mass mortality events among marine species are anticipated to be replaced by non-native ones, particularly those originating from the Red Sea.

The frequency of extreme occurrences such as heat waves, droughts, floods, and fires is anticipated to increase. Droughts may exacerbate social strife in the Mediterranean region. Scarce resources and wars can result in widespread people migrations. Heat-related illnesses and mortality will increase, particularly due to the urban heat island effect. Climate change will influence the proliferation of vector- and waterborne illnesses, while the quality of air, soil, and water will decline. Pollen allergies are expected to increase, while sanitary conditions may decline due to the ensuing societal and political circumstances.

=== International agreements ===
- Party to: Air Pollution, Biodiversity, Climate Change, Climate Change-Kyoto Protocol, Desertification, Endangered Species, Law of the Sea, Marine Dumping, Ozone Layer Protection, Ship Pollution, Wetlands
