= Ħalfa Rock =

Deserted small islet and limestone rock in the Maltese archipelago

Native name: Il-Ġebla tal-Ħalfa
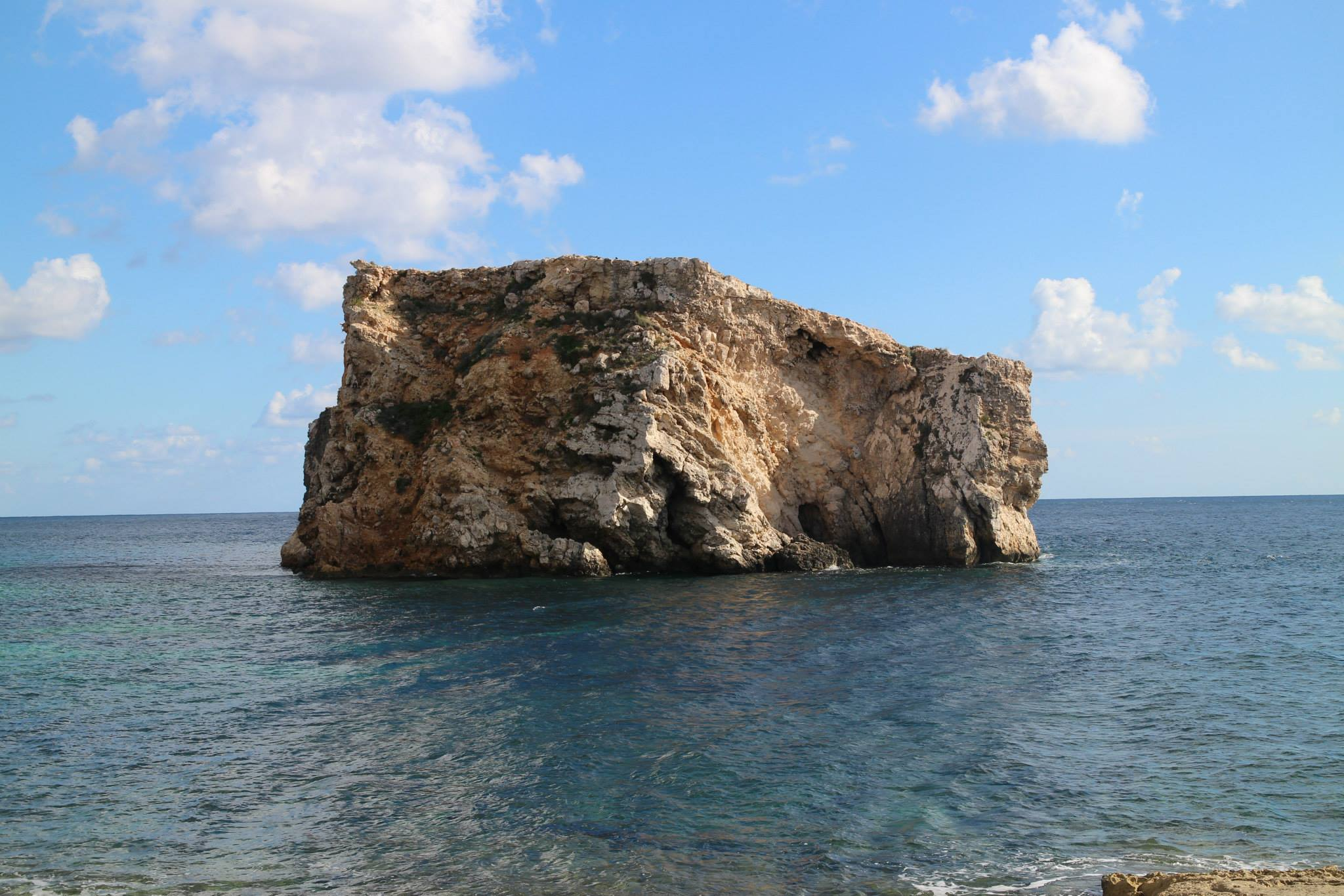
- View of Ħalfa Rock

- Location within Malta Location within Mediterranean

Geography
- Location: between Gozo and Comino, south of Sicily, Mediterranean Sea
- Coordinates: 36°01′45.2748″N 14°19′51.7692″E
- Archipelago: Maltese Islands
- Adjacent to: Mediterranean Sea
- Area: 0.0048 km^{2} (0.0019 sq mi)

Administration
- Malta
- Region: Gozo
- Local council: Qala

Demographics
- Population: 0

Additional information
- Time zone: CET (UTC+1)
  - Summer (DST): CEST (UTC+2)

Ħalfa Rock (Maltese: Il-Ġebla tal-Ħalfa or Il-Blata tal-Ħalfa) is a deserted small islet and limestone rock on the south-east coast of the island of Gozo in the Maltese archipelago. The islet is typified by a small maritime labiate garrigue environment, with germander and prasium shrubs, with the occurrence of the endemic Maltese Pyramidal Orchid as well as endemic coastal communities based on the Maltese Sea-Lavender and the sub-endemic Maltese Crosswort.

The rock has an area of approximately 0.48 hectares (1.2 acres). The maximum length of the islet is 95 metres (312 ft), and the average width is about 50 metres (160 ft). The island is protected by law. Ħalfa Rock is located approximately 65 metres (213 ft) from the south coast of the Qala municipality. It is part of a geological formation making up the island of Comino, and the upper areas of Qala. The rock is administratively a part of the Qala local council area.

The islet appears devoid of human heritage, with no record of habitation. However, a circular fougasse exists on the islet - forming part of the Tal-Qassis ridge defensive system overlooking the channel between Qala and Comino. Ħalfa Rock sits in a secluded shingle beach, with large pebbles and golden sand. A chain of submerged rocks, collectively known as Ġebel tal-Ħalfa (lit: 'Ħalfa Rock') lie within 400 metres (1,300 ft) of this islet. The rock has acted as a marker in the annual Malta-Gozo-Malta Open Water Swimming Competition.

== Origin of name ==
The origin of the name Tal-Ħalfa is a matter of conjecture. The word 'ħalfa' means 'oath' or 'vow' in Maltese. A local legend links with the name of the islet with Dragut, a famous pirate warrior and Ottoman admiral, who swore to seek revenge for his brother’s death on the island of Gozo. According to this legend, Dragut’s brother was killed in Gozo while raiding the island in 1544. The famous pirate asked for his brother’s corpse for burial. The Gozitans refused to turn the body over, and burned it in front of Dragut’s eyes in a place now occupied by St. John’s demi-bastion. It is said that when the Turks boarded their galleys to leave Gozo, Dragut went up on a large rock nearby, now known as il-Ġebla tal-Ħalfa (the Vow Rock), where he vowed to come back and wreak his vengeance on the people of Gozo. In 1551, Dragut laid siege to Mdina, but upon remembering his vow, he brought the Mdina siege to an end and sailed off to attack Gozo, taking almost the whole population into slavery.

Another legend relates how following a raid on the Maltese islands, Dragut was sailing past the coast of Gozo when he saw a vineyard on this part of the coast. Yearning for some grapes, he asked if any of his sailors would volunteer and swim to the shore for grapes. One of his sons obliged. On his return to the vessel he presented his father with a bunch of grapes, complete with leaves and the roots plucked out of the fertile soil. Dragut had no choice but to sentence his son to death, for it was forbidden for a Muslim to take the roots of a vine. Saddened, Dragut swore he would never eat a grape in his lifetime again, giving the nearby rocky islet its name.

== Wildlife ==
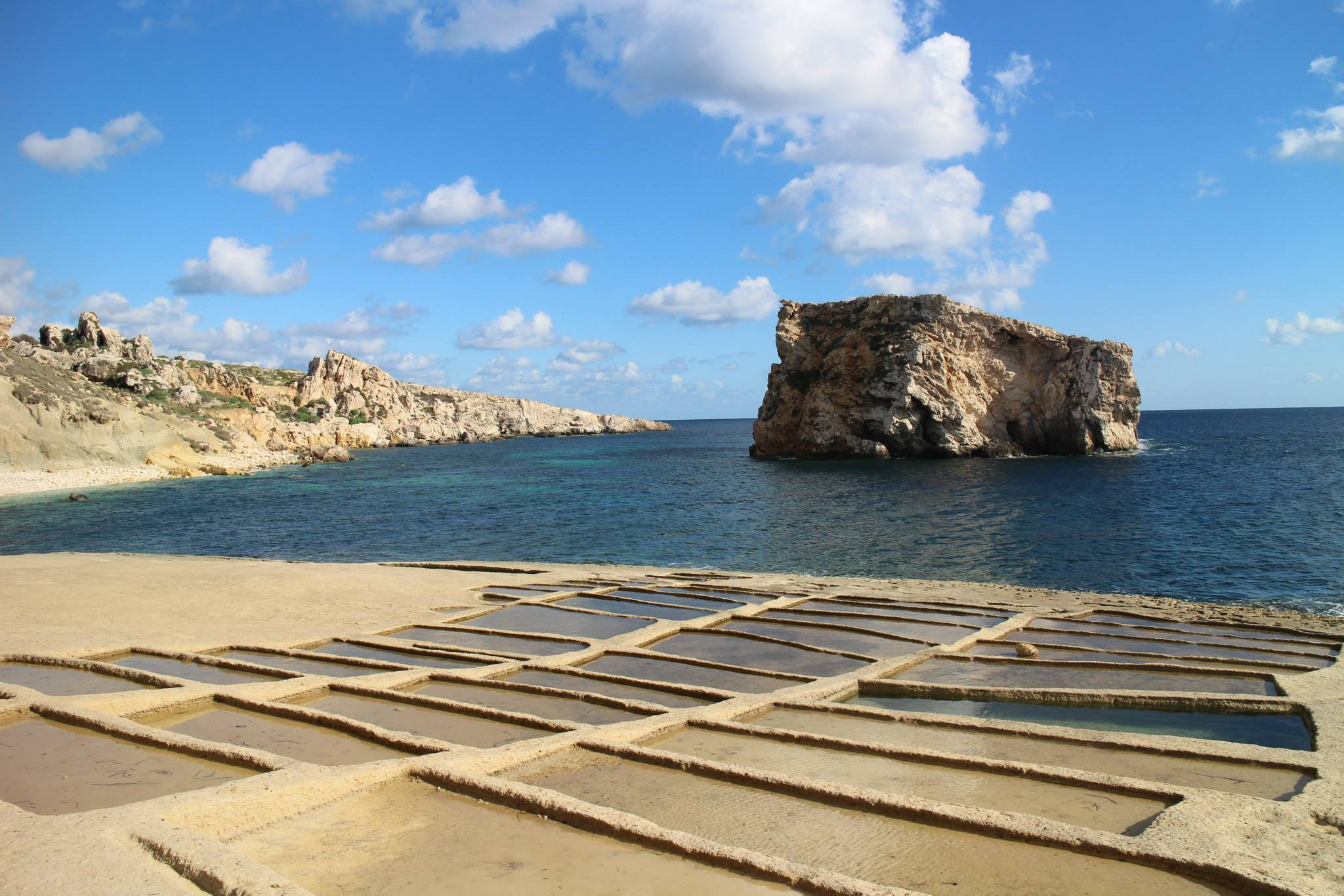
Saltpans near Ħalfa Rock.

The islet supports two distinct vegetation communities. The lower region is dominated by the shrubby glasswort (Arthrocnemum macrostachyum), with the olive-leaved bindweed (Convolvulus oleifolius) more dominant in the central part of the islet. Other important species present in the area include the Maltese sea-lavender (Limonium melitensis) and the sea carrot (Daucus rupestris), which is sub-endemic to the Maltese Islands, as well as Lampedusa, Lampione and Panarea. The upper region of the islet is colonised extensively by Esparto grass (Lygeum spartum), the olive-leaved bindweed, the pyramidal orchid (Anacamptis urvilleana), the Maltese leek (Allium melitense), the Carline thistle (Carlina involucrata) and two stunted lentisks (Pistacia lentiscus).

The fauna on this islet includes an isolated population of the endemic wall lizard (Podarcis filfolensis) and a morph of the endemic door snail (Muticaria macrostoma forma oscitans). The faunal species are isolated from the mainland populations and thus have the potential of developing specific traits.

Studies of the seabed around Ħalfa Rock indicated the existence of a thick layer of submerged clay on the bedrock, which supports a facies with burrows of the thalassinid shrimp (Upogebia mediterranea). In many places, the biocoenosis of infralittoral algae is intermixed with the Posidonia oceanica meadows, and well sorted fine sands.

== Nature conservation ==
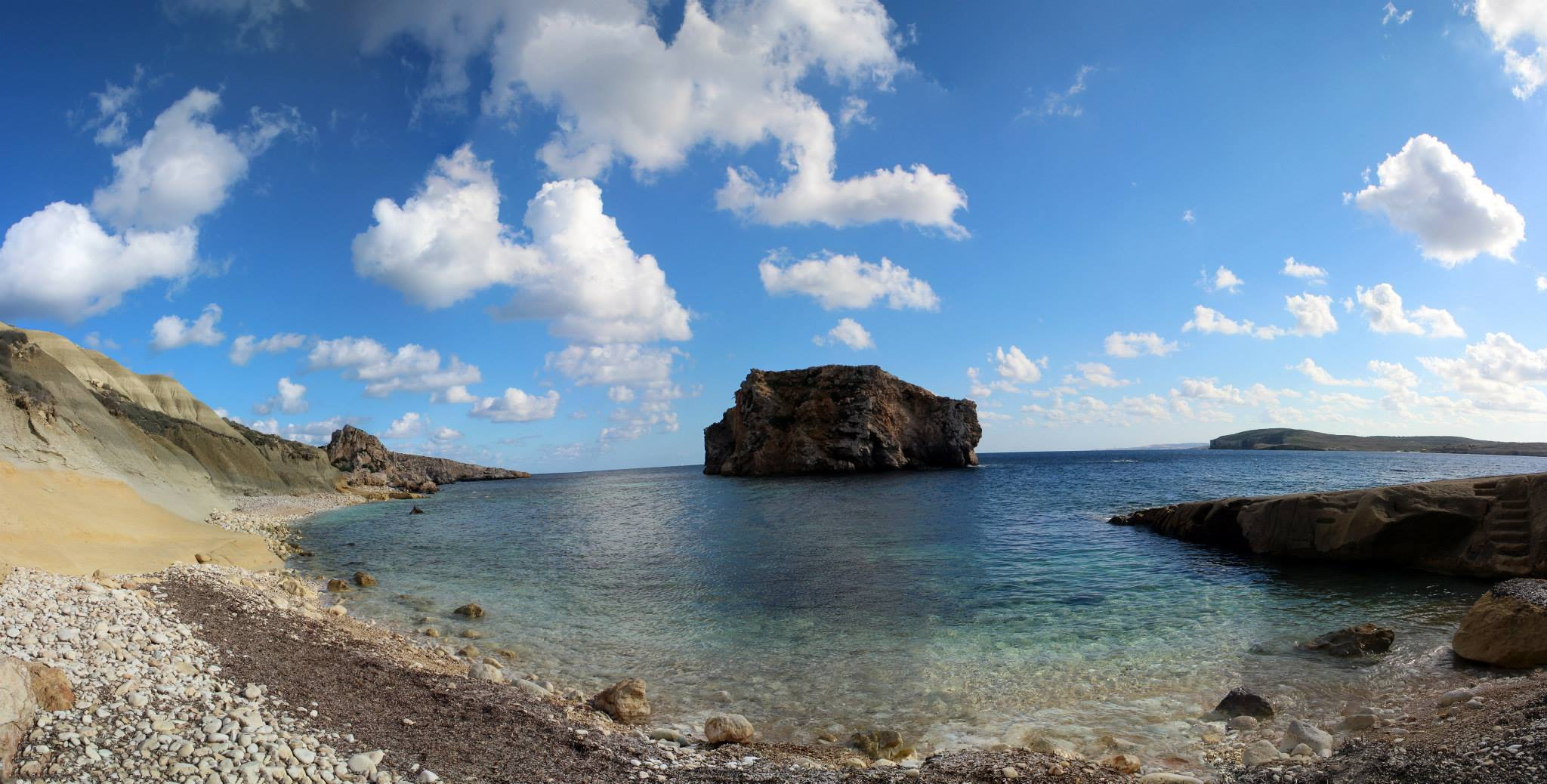
Panorama of Ħalfa Rock from the nearby beach.

Ħalfa Rock is on the Maltese Islands Natural Heritage List, and retains the status of an area of ecological importance and is also a special area of conservation. The Planning Authority scheduled Ħalfa Rock as a Level 1 Site of Scientific Importance (ecology), Level 2 Site of Scientific Importance (geomorphology), and a Level 2 Area of Ecological Importance as per Government Notice No. 827/02 in the Government Gazette dated 20 September 2002.

== Media and the arts ==
The islet appears in a children's adventure book titled Il-Ġebla tal-Halfa by Pawlu Mizzi.
