= Halfa =

Halfa may refer to:

- Halfa, Iowa, a community in the United States
- Wadi Halfa, a place in Northern Sudan
- New Halfa, a place in Sudan
- New Halfa Airport, Sudan
- Ħalfa Rock, an islet off the south-eastern coast of the island of Gozo, Malta
- Battle of Alam el Halfa, a battle of World War II in North Africa
- A grass also called esparto
- Halfa, a supernatural creature from the Nickelodeon show, Danny Phantom
- "Halfa", Australian slang for "half an hour".
