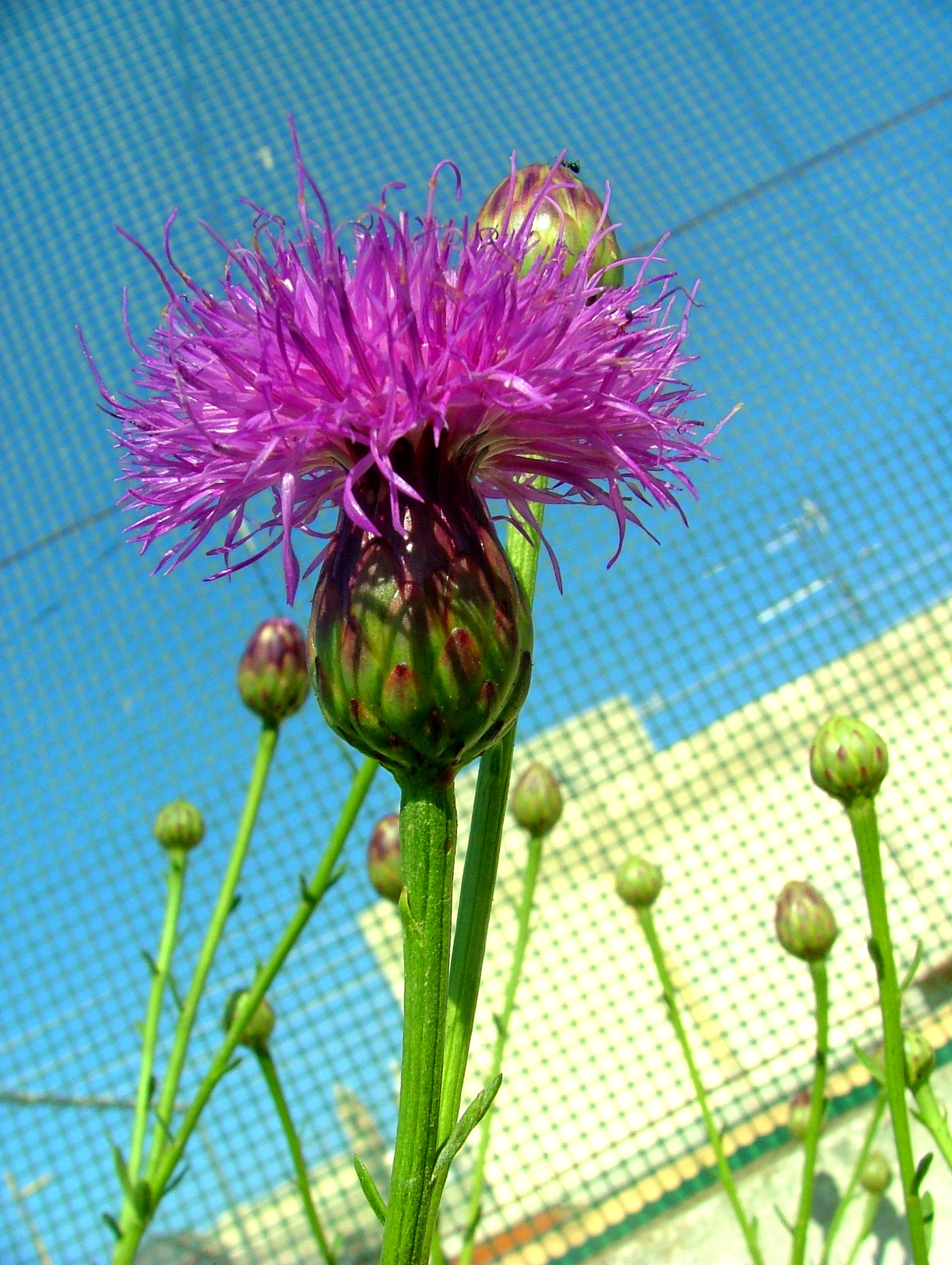
- Cheirolophus crassifolius

Scientific classification
- Kingdom: Plantae
- Clade: Embryophytes
- Clade: Tracheophytes
- Clade: Angiosperms
- Clade: Eudicots
- Clade: Asterids
- Order: Asterales
- Family: Asteraceae
- Subfamily: Carduoideae
- Tribe: Cardueae
- Subtribe: Centaureinae
- Genus: Cheirolophus; Cass.

Synonyms
- Ptosimopappus Boiss.; Palaeocyanus Dostál

= Cheirolophus =

Genus of flowering plants

Cheirolophus is a genus of flowering plants in the family Asteraceae first described as a genus in 1827. It is native to the western Mediterranean Region from the Canary Islands and Madeira, through Morocco and Algeria, continental Portugal and Spain, southern France, the Balearic Islands, Corsica, Sicily and Malta.

Species

- Cheirolophus arboreus
- Cheirolophus arbutifolius
- Cheirolophus benoistii
- Cheirolophus canariensis
- Cheirolophus crassifolius
- Cheirolophus dariasii
- Cheirolophus duranii
- Cheirolophus falcisectus
- Cheirolophus ghomerythus
- Cheirolophus grandifolius
- Cheirolophus intybaceus
- Cheirolophus junonianus
- Cheirolophus lagunae
- Cheirolophus mansanetianus
- Cheirolophus massonianus
- Cheirolophus mauritanicus
- Cheirolophus metlesicsii
- Cheirolophus santos-abreui
- Cheirolophus satarataensis
- Cheirolophus sempervirens
- Cheirolophus sventenii
- Cheirolophus tagananensis
- Cheirolophus tananicus
- Cheirolophus teydis
- Cheirolophus uliginosus
- Cheirolophus webbianus
