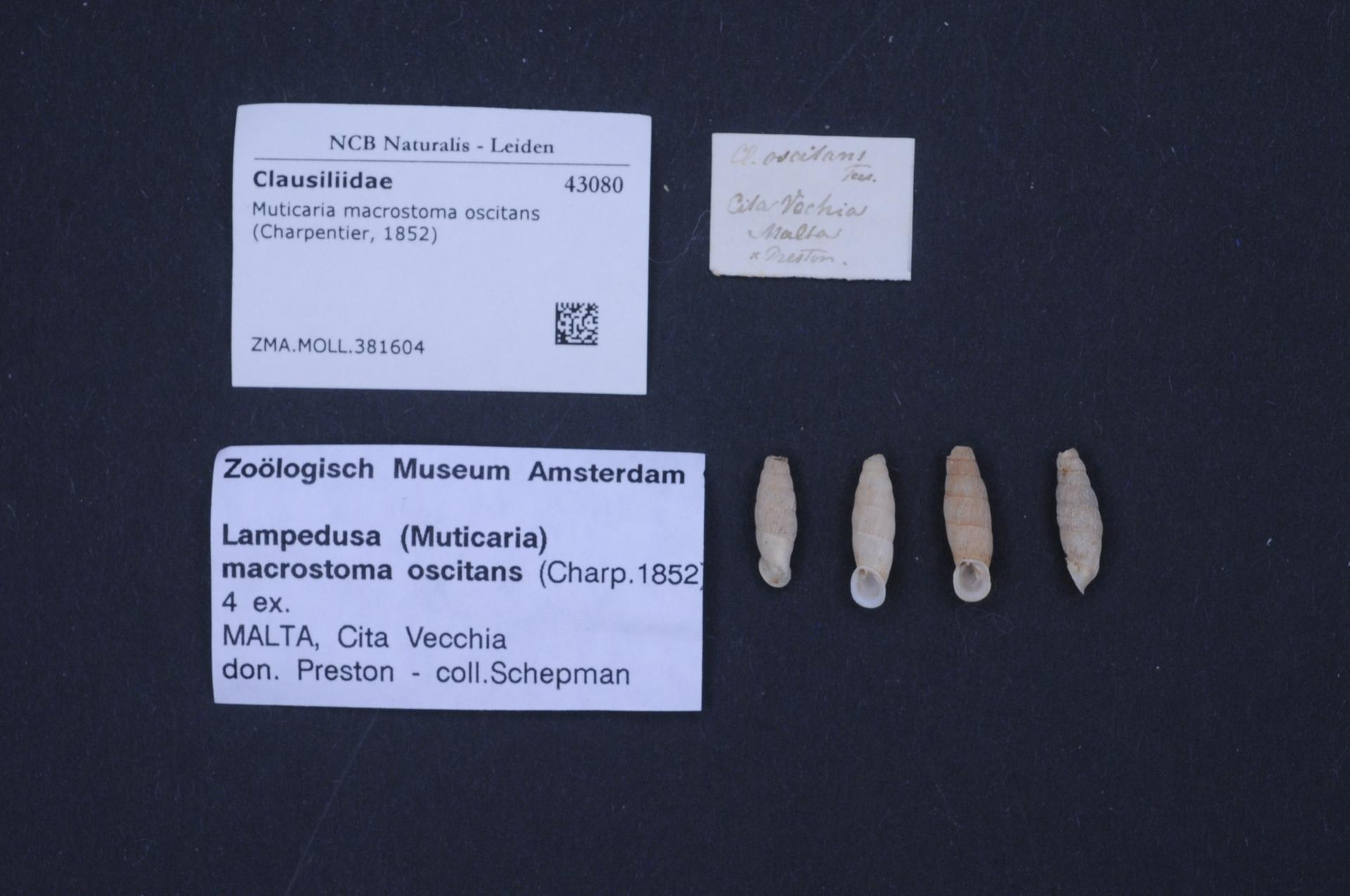
- Muticaria macrostoma

Scientific classification
- Kingdom: Animalia
- Phylum: Mollusca
- Class: Gastropoda
- Order: Stylommatophora
- Family: Clausiliidae
- Genus: Muticaria; Lindholm, 1925

Diversity
- 3 species

= Muticaria =

Genus of gastropods

Muticaria is a genus of small, air-breathing land snails, terrestrial pulmonate gastropod mollusks in the family Clausiliidae, the door snails, all of which have a clausilium.

== Distribution ==
Distribution of the genus Muticaria includes Southeastern Sicilia in Italy and Malta.

== Species ==
Species within the genus Clausilia include:

- Muticaria macrostoma (Cantraine, 1835) - synonyms: Clausilia scalaris Pfeiffer, 1850, type species
- Muticaria neuteboomi Beckmann, 1990
- Muticaria syracusana (Philippi, 1836)
