= Cominotto =

Small island off Malta

Native name: Kemmunett
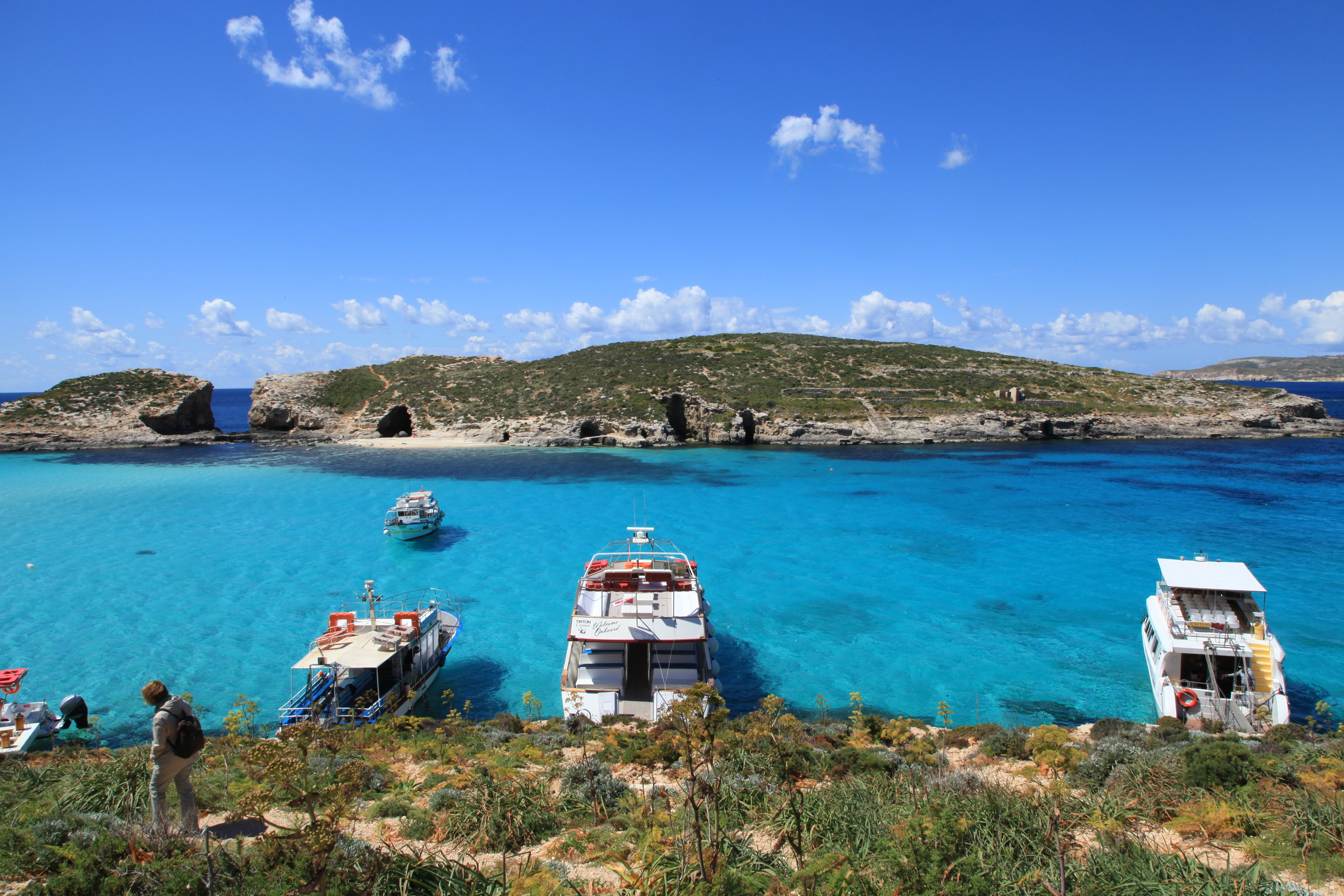
- Cominotto as seen from Comino

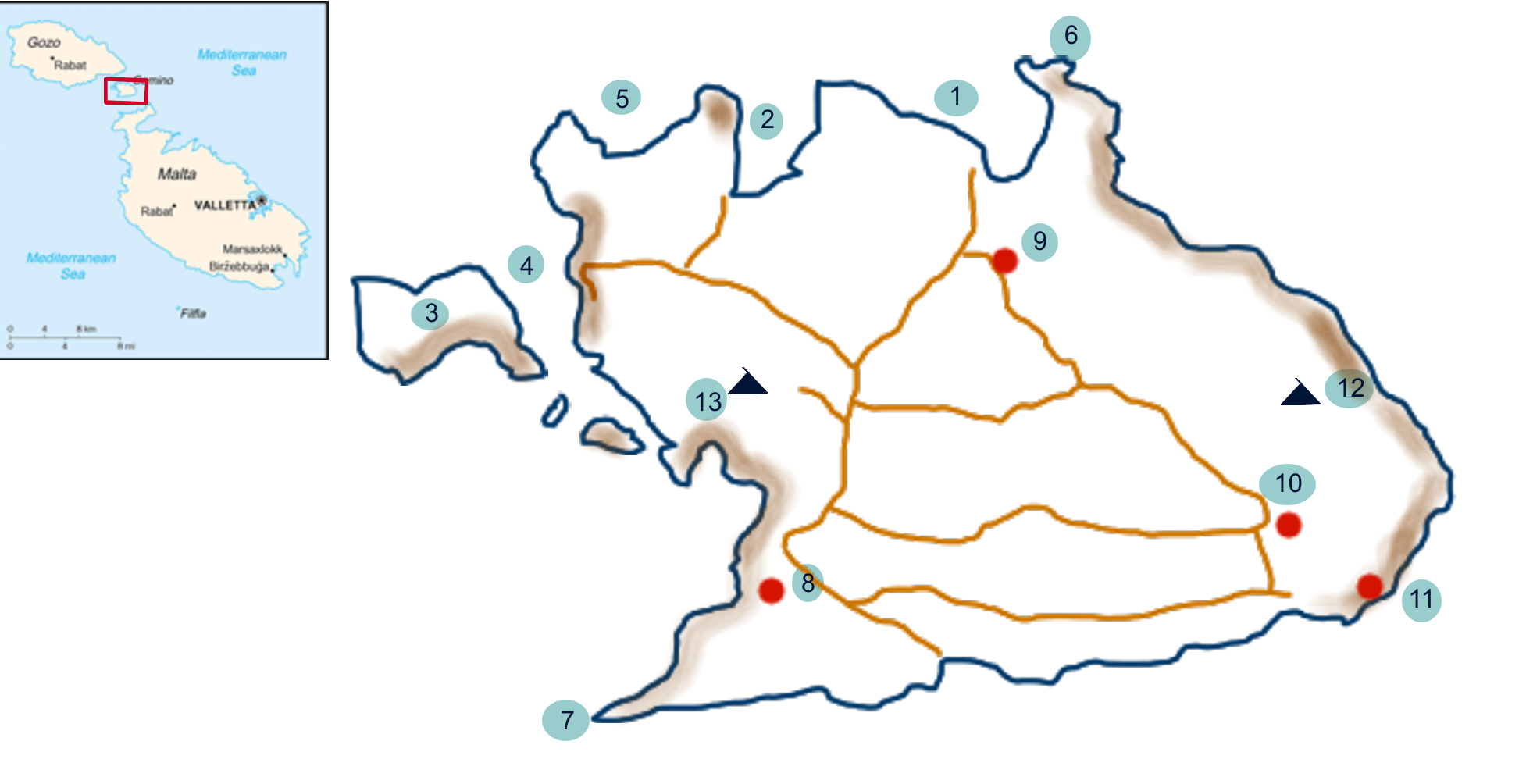
- Map of Comino. Cominotto is the small island on the left.

- Location within Malta

Geography
- Location: off Comino, between Gozo and Malta, south of Sicily, Mediterranean Sea
- Coordinates: 36°00′49″N 14°19′11.9″E
- Archipelago: Maltese Islands
- Total islands: 7
- Major islands: 1
- Area: 0.25 km^{2} (0.097 sq mi)
- Length: 396 m (1299 ft)
- Width: 31.89–475.3 m (104.6–1,559.4 ft)
- Coastline: 1.72 km (1.069 mi)
- Highest elevation: 44 ft (13.4 m)

Administration
- Malta
- Region: Gozo
- Local council: Għajnsielem

Demographics
- Population: 0

Cominotto (Maltese: Kemmunett), sometimes referred to as Cominetto, is an uninhabited Mediterranean island off the northwestern coast of Comino, itself located between the two main Maltese islands of Gozo and Malta. It is located just off the eponymous larger island of Comino and is part of the Maltese archipelago. Measuring 0.25 square kilometres (0.10 sq mi) in area, it is the largest uninhabited island in Malta.

== Geography ==
The island has a rugged coastline and rocky terrain. It is home to several species of seabirds and predatory rats. Adjacent to Cominotto lies the Blue Lagoon, a popular destination for tourists in the Maltese archipelago. Due to its ecological importance, Cominotto is part of a Special Protection Area.

== History ==
Cominotto was used by the Romans as a hunting ground. In more recent centuries, the island has been uninhabited.

== See also ==
- Comino
- Malta
- Maltese Islands
