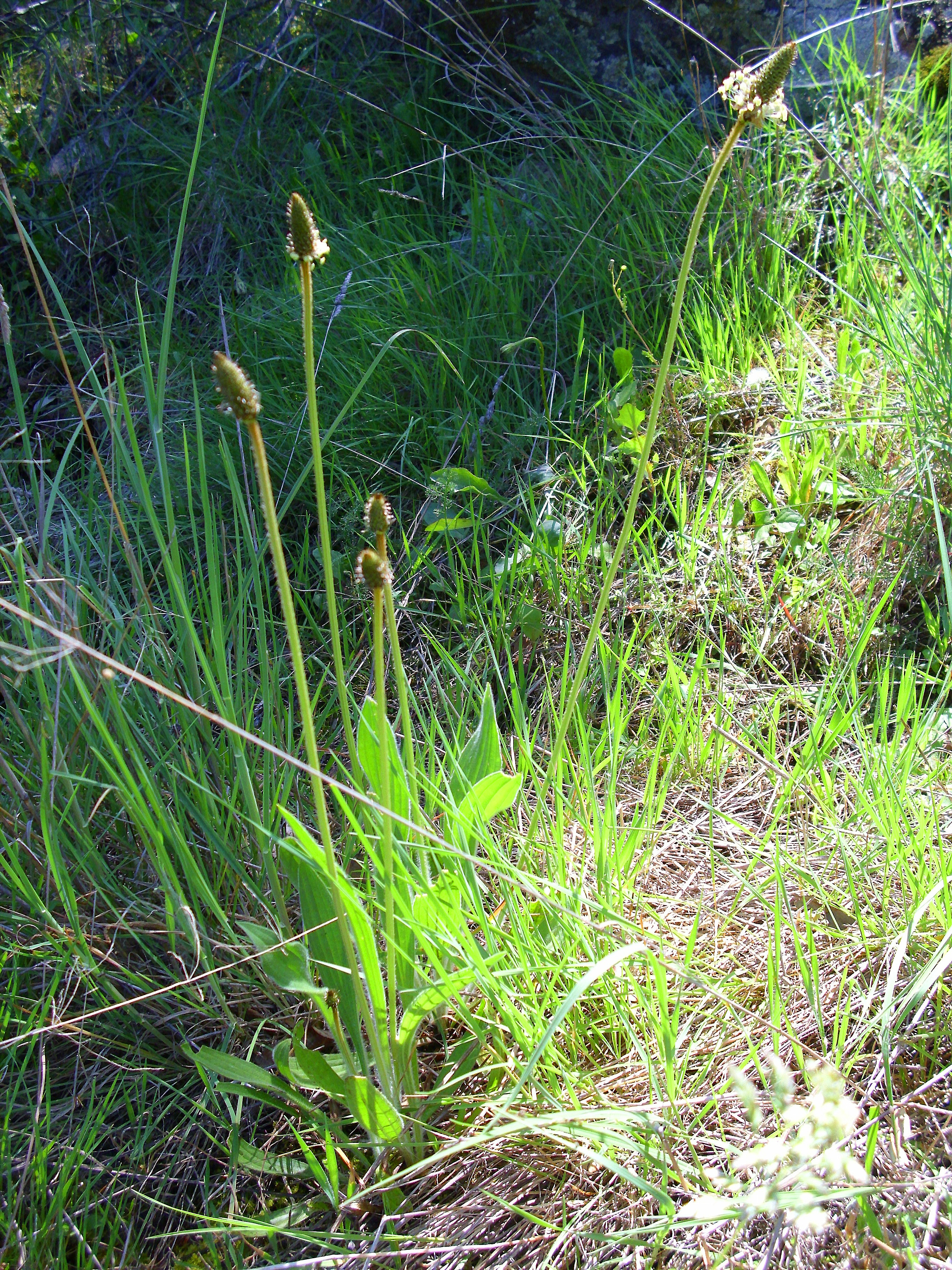

Scientific classification
- Kingdom: Plantae
- Clade: Tracheophytes
- Clade: Angiosperms
- Clade: Eudicots
- Clade: Asterids
- Order: Lamiales
- Family: Plantaginaceae
- Genus: Plantago
- Species: P. lagopus

Binomial name
- Plantago lagopus L.

= Plantago lagopus =

Species of plant

Plantago lagopus, the hare's foot plantain, is a species of annual herb in the family Plantaginaceae. They have a self-supporting growth form and simple, broad leaves. Flowers are visited by Heliotaurus ruficollis, Malachius, Metopoplax origani, and brown argus. Individuals can grow to 25 cm.

== Sources ==
This article incorporates text from a free content work. Licensed under CC0 (license statement/permission). Text taken from Plantago lagopus. Encyclopedia of Life.
