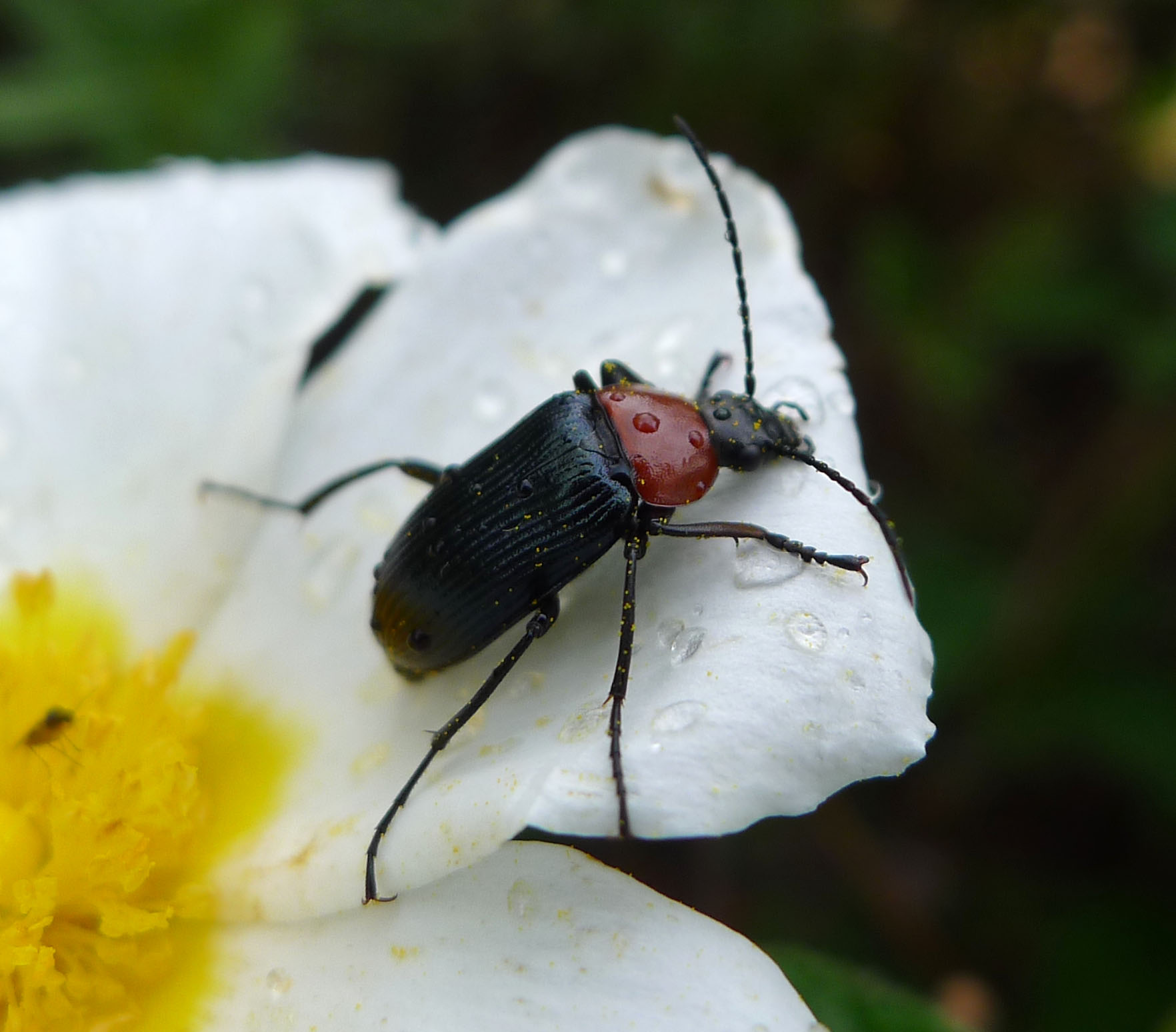
- Heliotaurus ruficollis

Scientific classification
- Domain: Eukaryota
- Kingdom: Animalia
- Phylum: Arthropoda
- Class: Insecta
- Order: Coleoptera
- Suborder: Polyphaga
- Infraorder: Cucujiformia
- Family: Tenebrionidae
- Subfamily: Alleculinae
- Tribe: Cteniopodini
- Genus: Heliotaurus; Mulsant, 1856

Subgenera
- Atlasotaurus Bouyon, 2011; Heliotaurus Mulsant, 1856; Julogenius Reitter, 1906

= Heliotaurus =

Genus of beetles

Heliotaurus is a genus of comb-clawed beetles in the family Tenebrionidae. There are at least six described species in Heliotaurus. They are found in the Palearctic and tropical Africa.

== Species ==
These species belong to the genus Heliotaurus:

- Heliotaurus crassidactylus Seidlitz, 1896
- Heliotaurus ruficollis (Fabricius, 1781)
- Heliotaurus rufithorax Reitter, 1906
- Heliotaurus sanguinicollis Reitter, 1906
- Heliotaurus seidlitzi Reitter, 1906
- Heliotaurus tenuipes Seidlitz, 1896
