= Ta' Dmejrek =

Highest elevation point of Malta

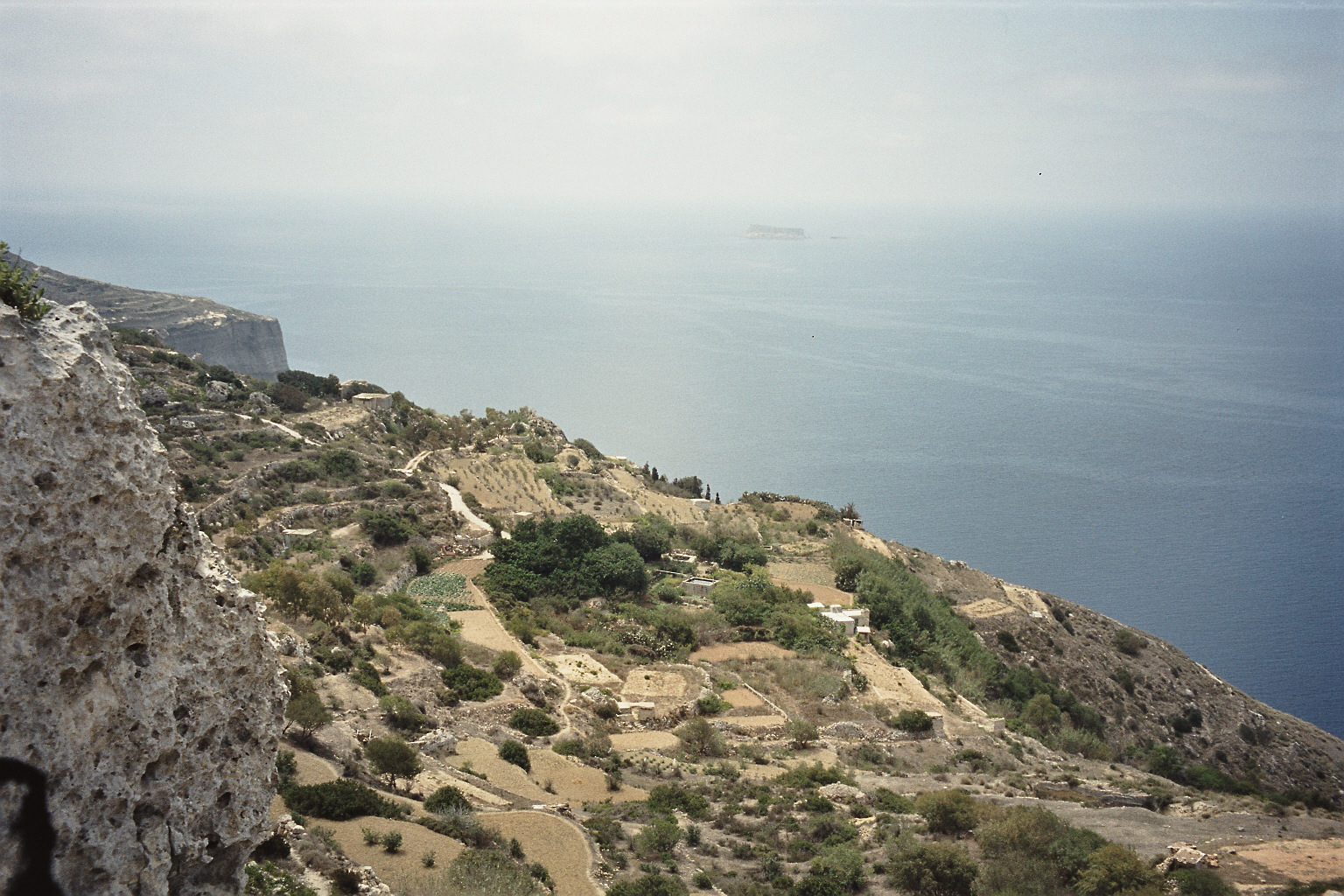
- View of Filfla and the Mediterranean Sea from Ta' Dmejrek.

Highest point
- Elevation: 253 m (830 ft)
- Prominence: 253 m (830 ft)
- Listing: Country high point
- Coordinates: 35°50′45″N 14°23′49″E

Geography
- Location within Malta
- Location: Siġġiewi, Malta

Ta' Dmejrek is the highest point of Malta, located on the Dingli Cliffs, with an elevation of 253 metres (830 ft) above sea level.

== See also ==
- Geography of Malta
- Extreme points of Malta
- List of highest points of European countries
