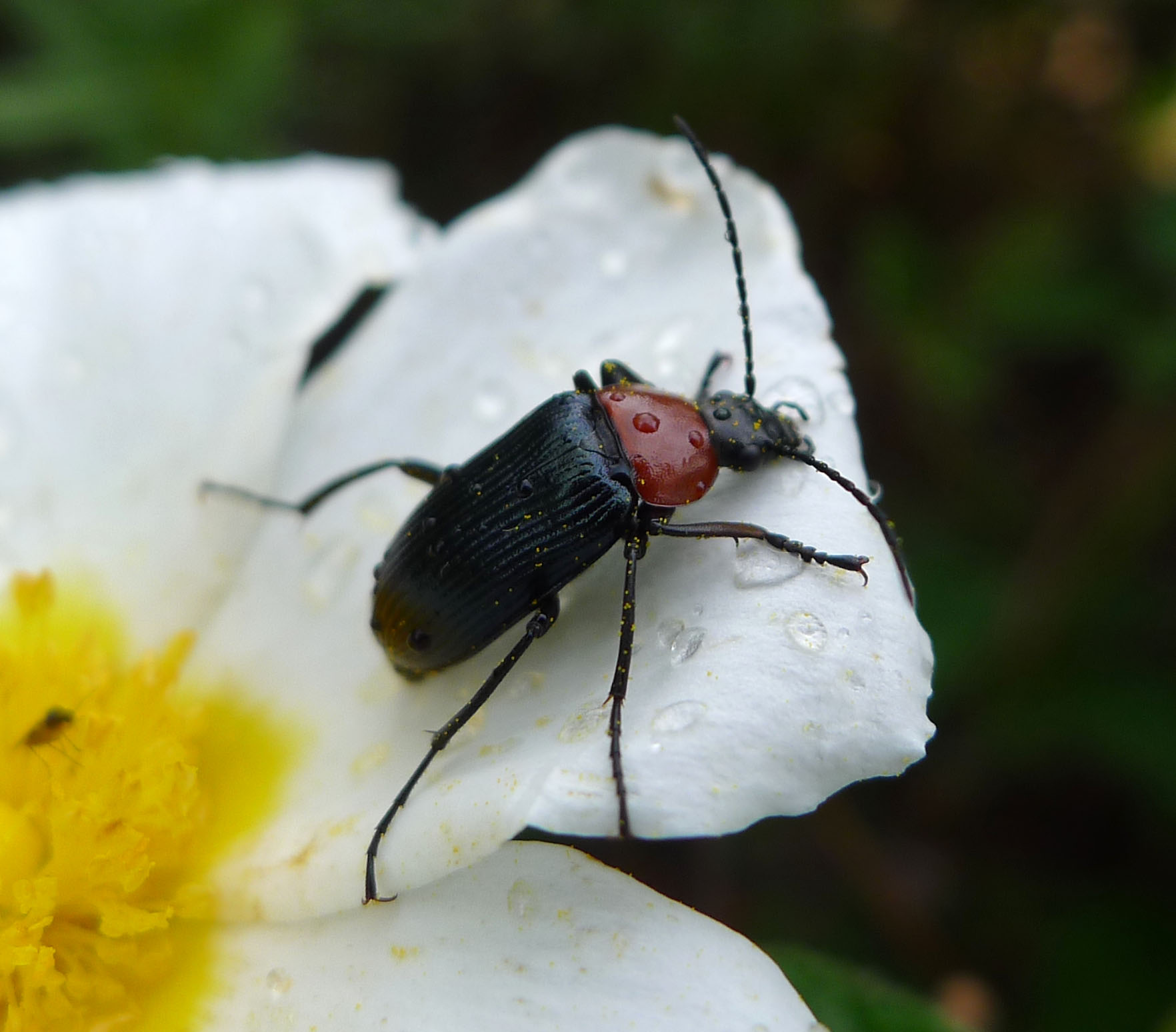

Scientific classification
- Domain: Eukaryota
- Kingdom: Animalia
- Phylum: Arthropoda
- Class: Insecta
- Order: Coleoptera
- Suborder: Polyphaga
- Infraorder: Cucujiformia
- Family: Tenebrionidae
- Subfamily: Alleculinae
- Tribe: Cteniopodini
- Genus: Heliotaurus
- Species: H. ruficollis

Binomial name
- Heliotaurus ruficollis (Fabricius, 1781)

= Heliotaurus ruficollis =

Species of beetle

Heliotaurus ruficollis is a species of comb-clawed beetle in the family Tenebrionidae, found in southern Europe and northern Africa. The beetles are generally black with a dark red thorax.
