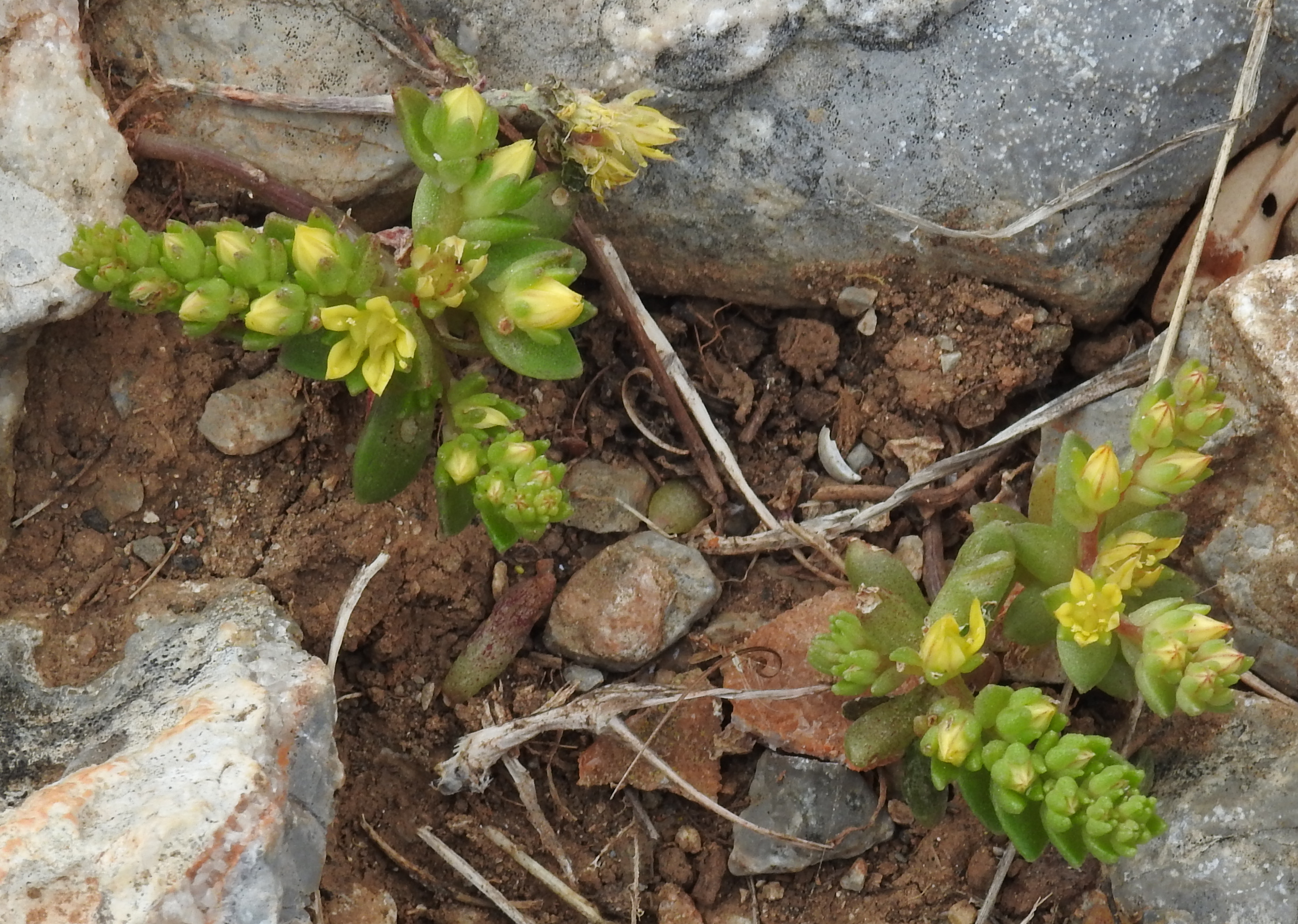

Scientific classification
- Kingdom: Plantae
- Clade: Tracheophytes
- Clade: Angiosperms
- Clade: Eudicots
- Order: Saxifragales
- Family: Crassulaceae
- Genus: Sedum
- Species: S. litoreum

Binomial name
- Sedum litoreum Guss. (1826)

Subspecies
- Sedum litoreum var. creticum 't Hart; Sedum litoreum var. litoreum

Synonyms
- Sedum annuum subsp. litoreum (Guss.) Bonnier & Layens (1894); Sedum marichalii J.Lloyd (1854); Sedum rhytidocalyx Candargy (1897); Sedum stellatum d'Urv. (1822), nom. illeg.

= Sedum litoreum =

Species of plant

Sedum litoreum is a species of succulent annual herb in the family Crassulaceae. Individuals can grow to 3.7 cm. It is native to the central and eastern Mediterranean, from Corsica and Sardinia to Italy, Sicily, former Yugoslavia, Albania, Greece and the Greek Islands, Turkey, Cyprus, and the Levant.

Two subspecies are accepted:

- Sedum litoreum var. creticum 't Hart – Crete
- Sedum litoreum var. litoreum – central and eastern Mediterranean

== Sources ==
This article incorporates text from a free content work. Licensed under CC0 (license statement/permission). Text taken from Sedum litoreum. Encyclopedia of Life.
