= Allium melitense =

Scientific classification
- Kingdom: Plantae
- Clade: Tracheophytes
- Clade: Angiosperms
- Clade: Monocots
- Order: Asparagales
- Family: Amaryllidaceae
- Subfamily: Allioideae
- Genus: Allium
- Subgenus: A. subg. Allium
- Species: A. melitense

Binomial name
- Allium melitense (Sommier & Caruana ex Borg) Cif. & Giacom.

Species of wild leek

Allium melitense (Maltese, Kurrat ta' Malta) is a species of wild leek endemic to the Maltese archipelago. The species was first described as a variety of Allium ampeloprasum by Stefano Sommier and Alfredo Caruana Gatto in their Maltese flora published in 1915, while emphasizing its observable differences with A. ampeloprasum and the need for further study. The taxon was then elevated to species by Raffaele Ciferri and Valerio Giacomini, and again by Mifsud & Mifsud in 2018.

Much larger forms are found in Filfla and on Fungus Rock with specimens almost 2 m (6 ft 7 in) tall and inflorescences exceeding 10 cm (3.9 in). It grows on rocky soils. It resembles Allium commutatum but is smaller (measuring about 30 cm (12 in)) and with inflorescences rarely exceeding 3 cm (1.2 in).

== Taxonomic reevaluation ==
The taxonomic classification of Allium melitense, once considered an exclusive species native to the Maltese Islands, has been reevaluated based on a 2018 study conducted by Stephen Mifsud and Owen Mifsud. The findings indicate that Allium melitense is now recognized as comprising smaller forms or ecotypes within the A. polyanthum range. Some authors have previously grouped various closely related species with A. ampeloprasum, a classification that is considered overly inclusive for distinct species like A. polyanthum, A. babingtonii, and A. porrum. A recent study by Stephen Mifsud and Owen Mifsud in 2018 identified Allium polyanthum in Malta. Earlier, these populations were commonly believed to be A. commutatum and the endemic Allium melitense. However, the latter has been synonymized with A. polyanthum, and the former is exceptionally rare in Malta, with only two known populations, as indicated in the aforementioned study.

== Synonyms ==
- Allium ampeloprasum var. melitense Sommier & Caruana ex Borg
- Allium polyanthum Schult. & Schult.f.
