= New Halfa Airport =

- IATA: NHF; ICAO: HSNW

Summary
- Airport type: Public
- Location: New Halfa, Sudan
- Elevation AMSL: 1,480 ft (450 m)
- Coordinates: 15°21′20″N 35°43′40″E

Map
- Location within Sudan

Runways
Direction	Length		Surface
Direction	m	ft	Surface
03/21	1,500	4,921

New Halfa Airport (IATA: NHF, ICAO: HSNW) is an airport serving New Halfa, located in the state of Kassala in Sudan.

== Facilities ==
The airport resides at an elevation of 1,480 feet (451 m) above mean sea level. It has one runways which is 1,500 metres (4,921 ft) in length.
