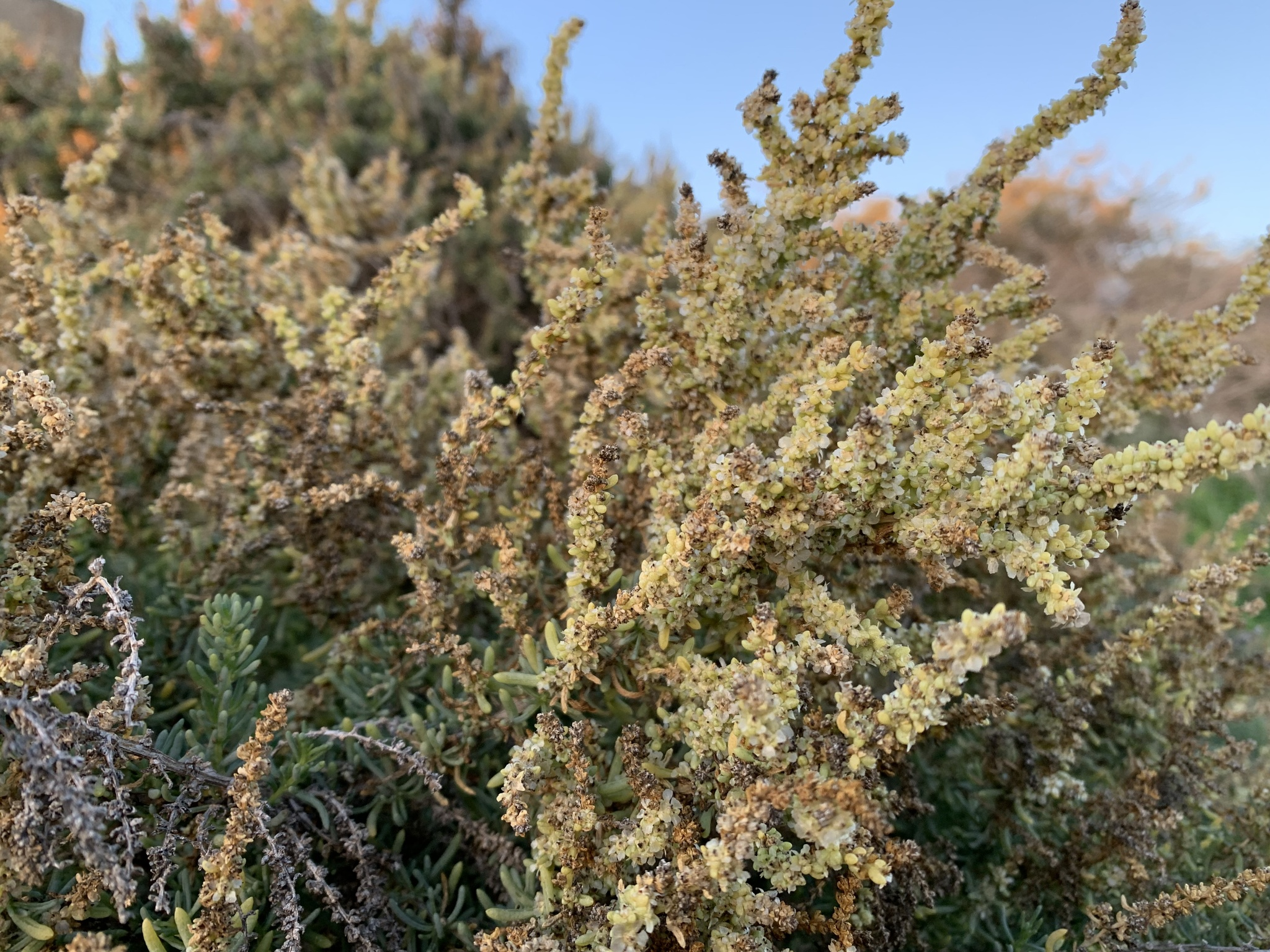

Scientific classification
- Kingdom: Plantae
- Clade: Embryophytes
- Clade: Tracheophytes
- Clade: Spermatophytes
- Clade: Angiosperms
- Clade: Eudicots
- Order: Caryophyllales
- Family: Amaranthaceae
- Genus: Salsola
- Species: S. melitensis

Binomial name
- Salsola melitensis Botsch.

Synonyms
- Darniella melitensis (Botsch.) Brullo.

= Salsola melitensis =

Species of flowering plant

Salsola melitensis, commonly known as Maltese salt tree, is a species of vascular plant that is endemic to the Maltese archipelago. Its generic name is derived from the Latin word “salsus” which means salty, attributing to the salt tolerant nature of the species within this genus.

== Classification ==
Work towards the identification and classification of Salsola melitensis began in around 1970 when Lanfranco and Brullo confirmed that Salsola vermiculata (now Caroxylon vermiculatum) did not occur in Malta, contrary to what was so far reported, since Maltese specimens of purported S. vermiculata did not correspond to any existing taxonomic description at the time. S. melitensis was eventually classified by Botschantzev in 1976 from a herbarium specimen in Leningrad, establishing it as distinct from Salsola vermiculata with which it was confused for many years since 1915 after Sommier and Caruana Gatto's description.

Its generic name is derived from the Latin word “salsus” which means salty, attributing to the salt tolerant nature of the species within this genus. In 1984, some shrubby species in the genus Salsola were reorganised by Brullo under the genus Darniella. Salsola melitensis was then known as Darniella meliltensis until 2000, when the classification of the 12 species of the genus Darniella proposed by Brullo was rejected by Govaerts, and its species were transferred back to the genus Salsola.

== Description ==
Salsola melitensis is a perennial woody shrub with thin succulent leaves. Its stem trails on the ground or sometimes with the extremity tending to ascend. The trunk elevates the canopy to a height of up to 2.5 m. The leaves may be either filiform or semicylindrical and occur mainly in alternate fashion or occasionally be opposite. The flowers occur axillarily and are complete; they are also hermaphrodite or polygamous (i.e. with male or female sexual parts or both), bearing two small leafy structures (bracteoles) directly beneath the flower stalk. The summer-blooming flowers are composed of five membranous flower segments that are intermediate between petals and sepals: two inner ones and three outer ones, bearing five stamens on a glandular ring and a single style with two stigmas. The fruit is an utricle, which may be either depressed or spherical, as well as papery or fleshy; the horizontal five-winged seed holds a spiral embryo with a simple testa but no surrounding nutritive tissue. The seeds are normally orthodox, meaning that they can withstand severe drying and freezing for their long-term conservation.

== Distribution and habitat ==
Given that its seeds are winged, minuscule and therefore easily transported by wind, S. melitensis is known to colonise sea-side cliffs where it can avoid anthropogenic pressure; the plant is historically reported to also grow on slanting walls in fortifications in many parts of Malta, Gozo and Comino, and is reported to grow in the fortifications of the Citadel and Xagħra. In 1927, Borg reported S. melitensis (under the name of S. vermiculata) as being rare in Malta and occurring in Marsaxlokk, Birżebbuġa, and seaside cliffs in Dingli and Baħrija. In 2020, Brullo et al. reported that S. melitensis (= D. melitensis) occurs in so-called permasigmeta and geopermasigmeta habitats composing Suaedo verae-Darnellio melitensis communities on dry marly-clayey outcrops near the sea that allow for salty/nitrophilous environments. The plant is reported as being very resilient to harsh abiotic conditions, including lack of water, strong winds, sea spray and very little soil. Brullo et al. report the plant occurring in various locations providing comprehensive coverage in their account, including Baħrija valley, Għar Lapsi, Mġarr ix-Xini, Xlendi valley, Babu valley, Dikkiena cliffs, Tal-Bardan cliffs, Ta’ Ċenċ, Dwejra, Dingli, Comino, and some others. According to Mifsud et al. the species does not occur in Selmunett despite having been historically reported to occur there.

== Conservation ==
The conservation status of S. melitensis is “not evaluated” according to the Global Biodiversity Information Facility, and does not appear listed within the Red List of the IUCN. It is listed as threatened in the Red Data Book of the Republic of Malta. It is protected in Malta as an endemic species through Regulation 26 of Subsidiary Legislation 549.44 Flora, Fauna And Natural Habitats Protection Regulations. As it is a strictly protected shrub under national legislation, the species may not be pruned, cut or uprooted unless a permit by the authority for the environment has been granted. Additionally, as a Maltese genetic resource, access and utilization of the plant for research and/or development purposes is allowed if in possession of a permit by the authority responsible for the implementation of Subsidiary Legislation 549.111 Access to Genetic Resources and the Fair and Equitable Sharing of Benefits arising from their Utilisation Regulations. Salsola vermiculata is listed as a common fodder crop in Annex I of the International Treaty for Plant Genetic Resources for Food and Agriculture and is subject to provisions for facilitated access under the Treaty's multilateral system of access and benefit sharing; as S. vermiculata is a common crop, this elevates S. melitensis to the status of crop wild relative thus meriting special attention for conservation and sustainable development within the context of the Second Global Plan of Action for Plant Genetic Resources for Food and agriculture, as well as the Voluntary Guidelines for National Level Conservation of Crop Wild Relatives and Wild Food Plants.

== Uses ==
The Maltese salt tree is a rather unknown plant outside of Malta, and virtually no research on its biology or biochemistry has been done on it internationally. It is not within the inventory of plants of the Seed Information Database of the KEW Royal Botanical Gardens, nor is it listed in the GENESYS-PGR accession browser of the Global Crop Diversity Trust, the ENSCONET accession browser of the International Centre for Advanced Mediterranean Agronomic Studies, or the World Information and Early Warning System (WIEWS) accession browser of the United Nations. Nevertheless, the plant was used in olden days as a source of potash, possibly as a cleaning agent as it may have been used in conjunction with olive oil for the creation of rudimentary soap. Salsola soda is consumed as a vegetable in various parts of Italy (known as “barba del frate,” “agretti,” “rospici,” “liscari,” etc.) and Spain (known as “barilla.”) The herbaceous plantlet, like the herbaceous forms of Salsola spp. have high fodder value particularly in arid environments, given their high tolerance to extreme climatic conditions such as high temperatures and prolonged drought. Some studies report that foliage of S. vermiculata has up to 13.1% of protein content, 9% of which is digestible. Given their high affinity for saline environments, species of the Salsola genus may be used for the rehabilitation of degraded saline lands and reclamation of saline soils. Such uses are all the more useful in the face of climate change, a phenomenon which further exacerbates the halophytic characteristics of soils in semi-arid parts of the world where salt content is high and precipitation too low for salt leaching. In these regions, planting salt tolerant species as well as drought tolerant species, is the most useful approach in rehabilitating drought prone salt-affected degraded lands.

Some medicinal and cosmetic uses are also attributed to Salsola species, such as in the treatment of heart and skin conditions, or also cough. For several Salsola species, the whole plant, its parts or the extracts may purportedly be used to address various ailments. In S. kali, the powdered form of the entire plant is used to treat cough, while the ashes of aerial parts of S. imbricata are used mixed with sugar to treat abdominal distention, constipation and dyspepsia. Given the Maltese translation of the Maltese Salt Tree to “tree of ashes,” it may also be the case that similar uses were found for this plant in antiquity. Salsola species additionally produce useful biochemicals. The salsoline and salsolidine found in the leaves, flowers and fruits of Salsola species, particularly of S. richteri, are used to treat hypertension.

The salt extract of S. tragus is also considered important for the regulation of hypertension, and acts as a uterine vaso-constrictor, and to it are attributed other uses amongst which as a diuretic and for the treatments of intestinal obstructions. The roots of S. tetrandra are reported to produce tetranin alkaloids, which are also useful to treat hypertension, and bear potential for the treatment of rheumatoid arthritis and other autoimmune conditions. These compounds are normally found in spider mites’ saliva and elicit host plant defence against these pests. It is justified to think that such compounds may be developed into eco-friendly biocontrol agents which stimulate a plant's natural defences against pests.

The scientific studies on the uses of S. melitensis are virtually non-existent therefore no clear understanding exists about the potential uses of this plant. However, it is not preposterous to assume that some of the uses attributable to other members of the Salsola genus may also extend to the Maltese Salt Tree as well.
