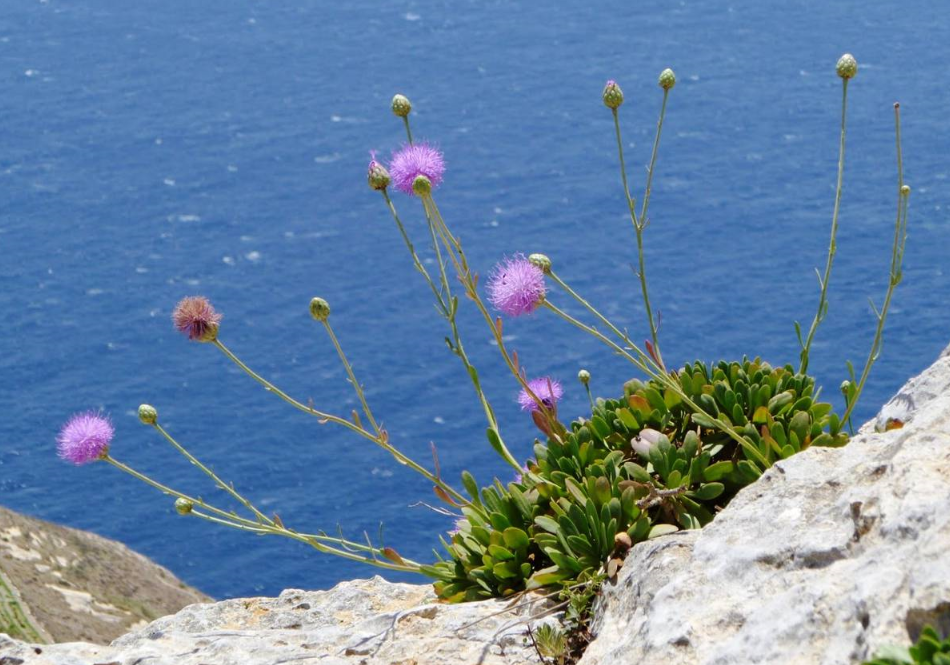

Conservation status
- Critically Endangered (IUCN 3.1)

Scientific classification
- Kingdom: Plantae
- Clade: Tracheophytes
- Clade: Angiosperms
- Clade: Eudicots
- Clade: Asterids
- Order: Asterales
- Family: Asteraceae
- Genus: Cheirolophus
- Species: C. crassifolius

Binomial name
- Cheirolophus crassifolius (Bertol.) Susanna

Synonyms
- Centaurea crassifolia Centaurea spathulata Palaeocyanus crassifolius Dostál

= Cheirolophus crassifolius =

Species of flowering plant

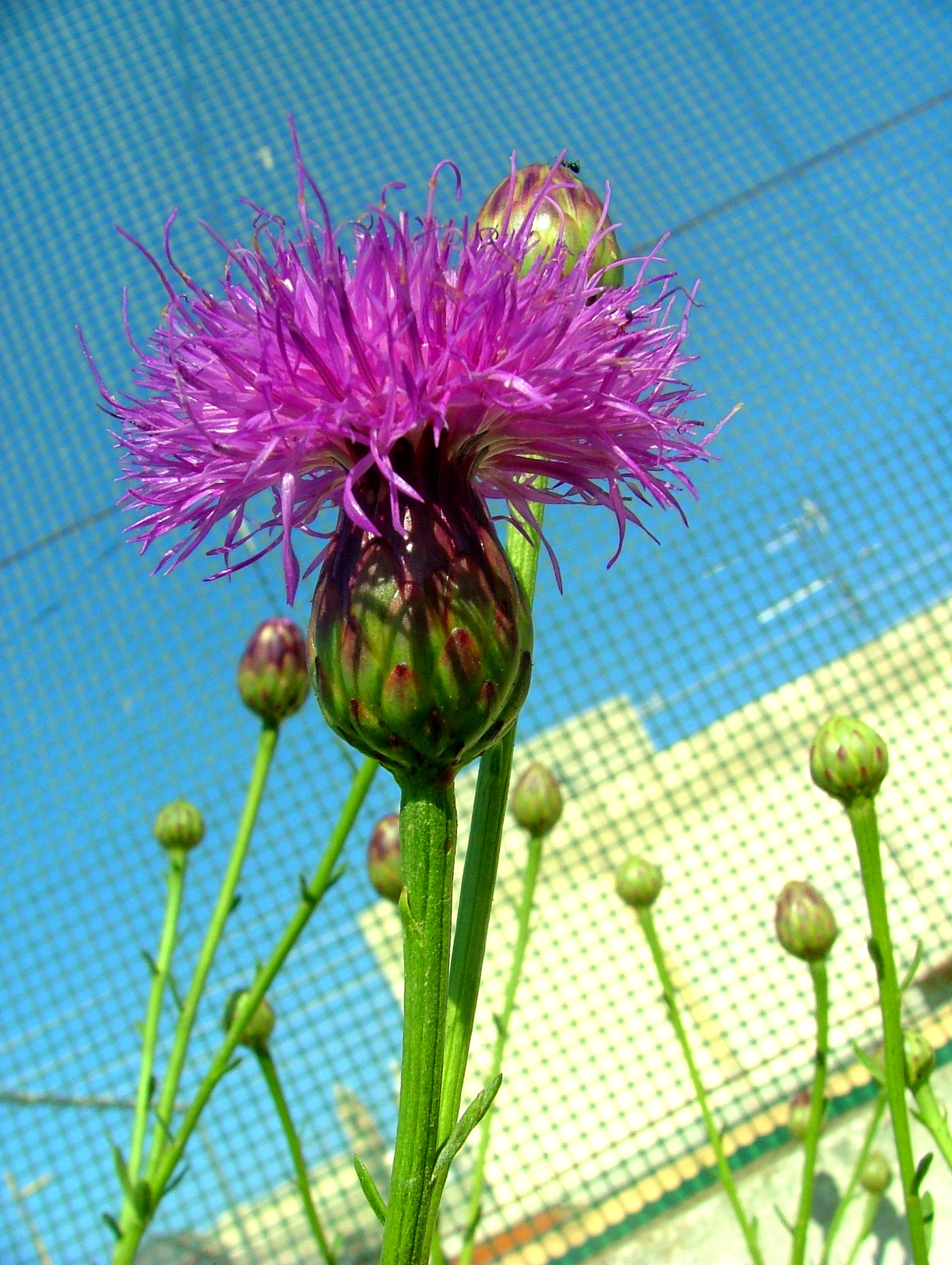
Cheirolophus crassifolius flower head

Cheirolophus crassifolius, the Maltese centaury, Maltese rock-centaury or Widnet il-Baħar, is a species of flowering plant in the family Asteraceae. It is endemic to Malta. Its natural habitats are cliffs and coastal valleys. It is threatened by habitat loss.

It is scarce but widespread in the wild on the western cliffs of Malta, rare on the southern cliffs of Gozo, but frequent as a cultivated species in roundabouts. It is quite common in the limits of Wied Babu in the south east of Malta.

It was first described by Stefano Zerafa, around 1830, as the only species of the monotypic genus Palaeocyanus. However, around the year 2000, it was transferred to Cheirolophus, in the light of genetic studies done in that year. The name Cheirolophus means hand-crest, referring to the hand-shaped bract tips of the most species in this genus, while crassifolius mean thick leaves. The leaves are succulent and spoon shaped. The variety serratifolia (serrated leaves) is very rare, and only known from Gozo. This species is cultivated due to its national importance.
