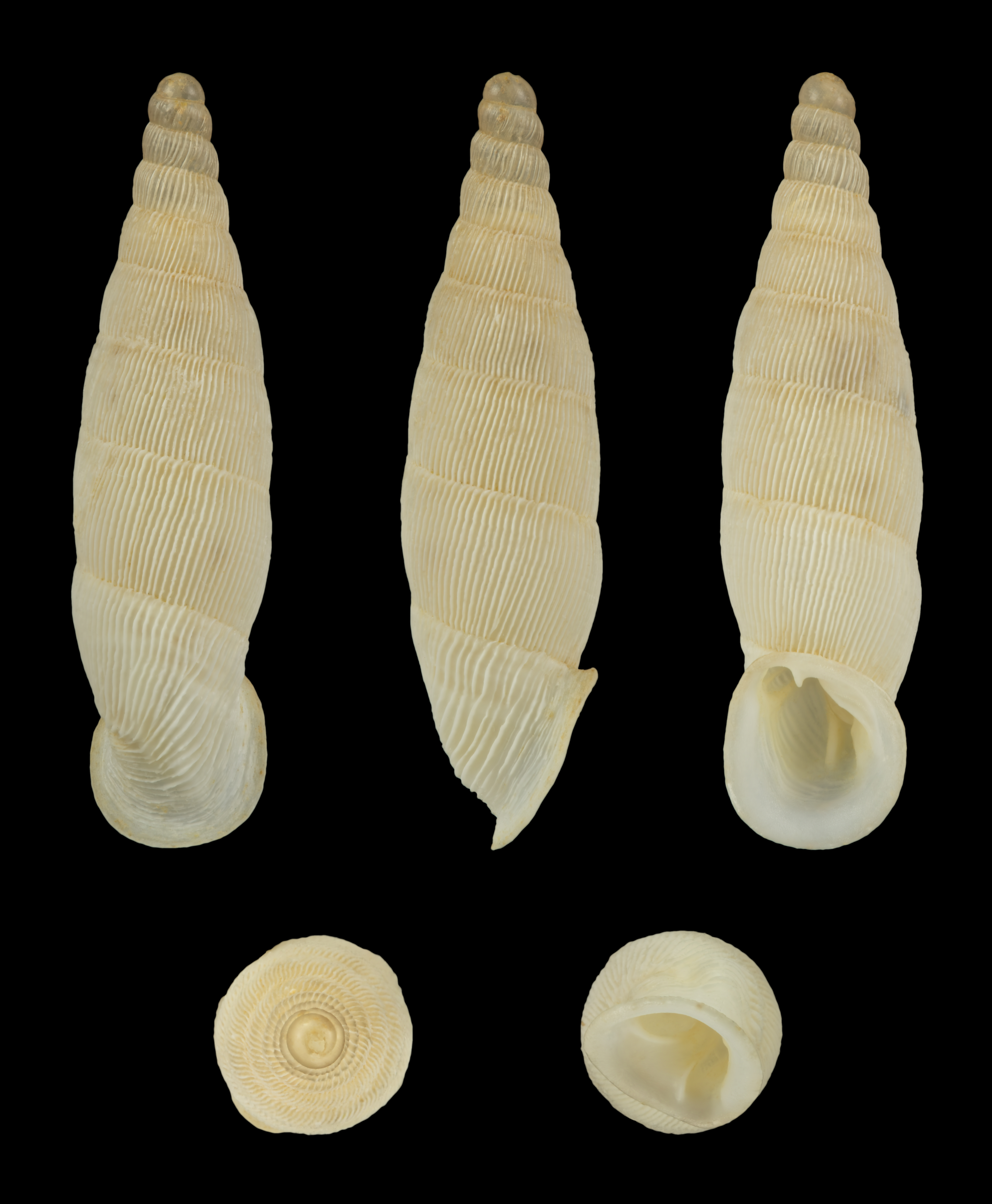

Conservation status
- Least Concern (IUCN 3.1)

Scientific classification
- Kingdom: Animalia
- Phylum: Mollusca
- Class: Gastropoda
- Order: Stylommatophora
- Family: Clausiliidae
- Genus: Muticaria
- Species: M. macrostoma

Binomial name
- Muticaria macrostoma (Cantraine, 1835)

Synonyms
- Clausilia macrosoma Cantraine, 1835; Clausilia scalaris Pfeiffer, 1850

= Muticaria macrostoma =

Species of gastropod

Muticaria macrostoma is a species of small air-breathing land snail, a terrestrial pulmonate gastropod mollusk in the family Clausiliidae, the door snails, all of which have a clausilium.

This species is endemic to the Mediterranean island of Malta.
