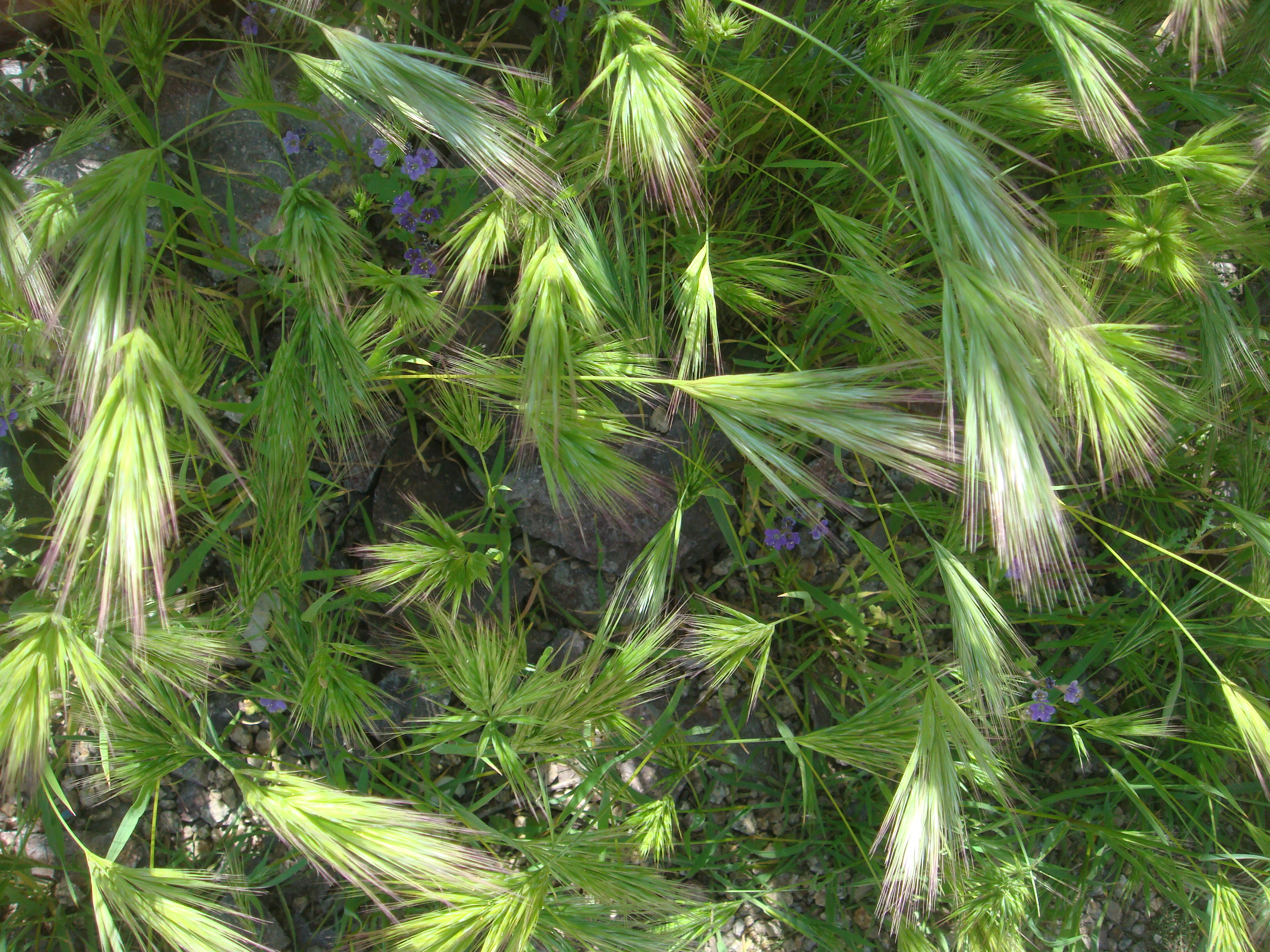
- Bromus madritensis subsp. rubens

Scientific classification
- Kingdom: Plantae
- Clade: Tracheophytes
- Clade: Angiosperms
- Clade: Monocots
- Clade: Commelinids
- Order: Poales
- Family: Poaceae
- Subfamily: Pooideae
- Genus: Bromus
- Species: B. madritensis

Binomial name
- Bromus madritensis L.

Synonyms
- Anisantha madritensis (L.) Nevski; Anisantha matritensis (L.) Nevski; Bromus matritensis L.

= Bromus madritensis =

Species of grass

Bromus madritensis is a species of brome grass known by the common name compact brome. The specific epithet madritensis refers to Madrid, Spain. It has a diploid number of 28.

There are two subspecies:

- Bromus madritensis subsp. madritensis: panicles less dense, stem and leaf sheath less hairy
- Bromus madritensis subsp. rubens (syn. Bromus rubens) – foxtail brome, foxtail chess, red brome: dense panicles and slightly hairy stems

== Description ==
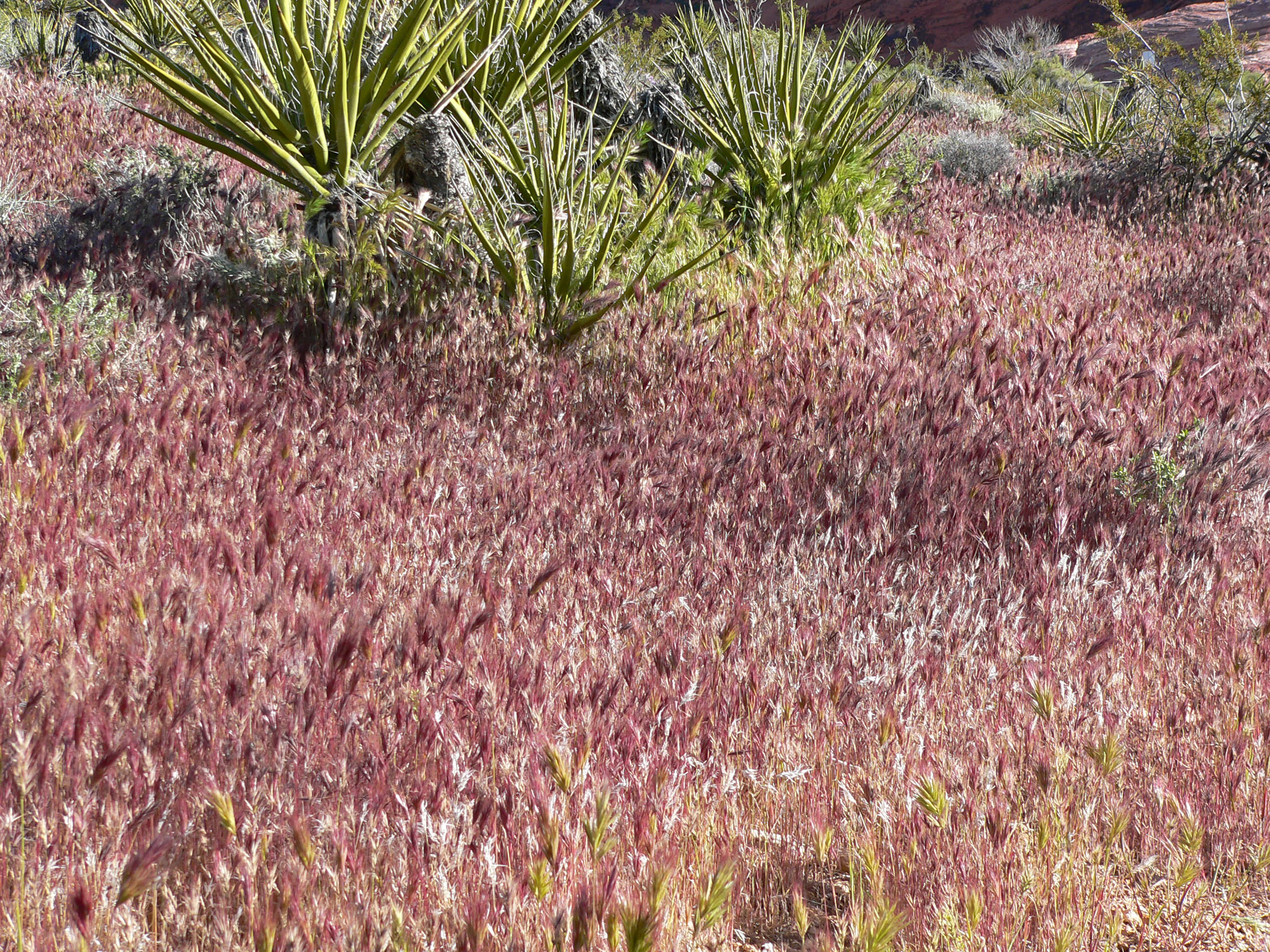
Reddish subspecies rubens habit

Bromus madritensis is a winter annual grass, growing solitary or tufted, with erect or ascending culms growing 20–70 cm (7.9–27.6 in) high. The leaf sheaths are downy or slightly hairy. The grass lacks auricles and the glabrous ligules are 1.5–2 mm (0.059–0.079 in) long. Its flat leaf blades are either glabrous or slightly hairy, and measure 4–20 cm (1.6–7.9 in) long and 1–5 mm (0.039–0.197 in) wide. The erect and ellipsoid panicles are 3–12 cm (1.2–4.7 in) long and 2–6 cm (0.79–2.36 in) wide, with short branches that ascend and slightly spread. The branches never droop and bear one or two spikelets each. The spikelets are 4–6 cm (1.6–2.4 in) long, longer than the panicle branches, and bear seven to eleven florets. The spikelets vary in color from green to distinctly purplish-red. The lightly hairy glumes taper at their ends and have translucent margins. The lower glumes are one-nerved and 5–10 mm (0.20–0.39 in) long, and the upper glumes are three-nerved and 10–15 mm (0.39–0.59 in) long. The glabrous and slightly rough lemmas are 1.5–2 cm (0.59–0.79 in) long. The lemmas are hairier towards their edges and have five to seven veins. The awns are about the same length, 1.2–2.3 cm (0.47–0.91 in) long, and curve slightly. The anthers are 0.5–1 mm (0.020–0.039 in) long. The caryopses are as long as 11 mm (0.43 in).

The grass emerges in early winter and remains dormant until spring when heavy rainfall and higher temperatures stimulate growth. Plants flower from this period typically until May when water stress inhibits the grass. Populations grow during periods of heavy rainfall and populations can be wiped out during extended periods of drought.

The grass alters soil conditions and the competition brought about by the grass both negatively affect native plant populations, and the highly flammable nature of the grass produces wildfires in North American communities where fire was previously rare. Dry florets of the weed entangle themselves in animal hair and can tear at the digestive tracts of foraging livestock.

== Habitat and distribution ==
Bromus madritensis is native to southern and western Europe but has been introduced and naturalized nearly worldwide. In North America it is found primarily in the western United States, in Oregon, California, and Arizona. The grass was brought to North America in 1848 and was naturalized by the 1890s.

In its native range the grass grows in cultivated fields and steppes, and in North America it grows in waste areas, road verges, and disturbed areas, in both ranges primarily on dry stony or sandy soil. In California, the weedy grass occurs in areas disturbed by wildfires. It grows from sea level to elevations of 1,300 m (4,300 ft).
