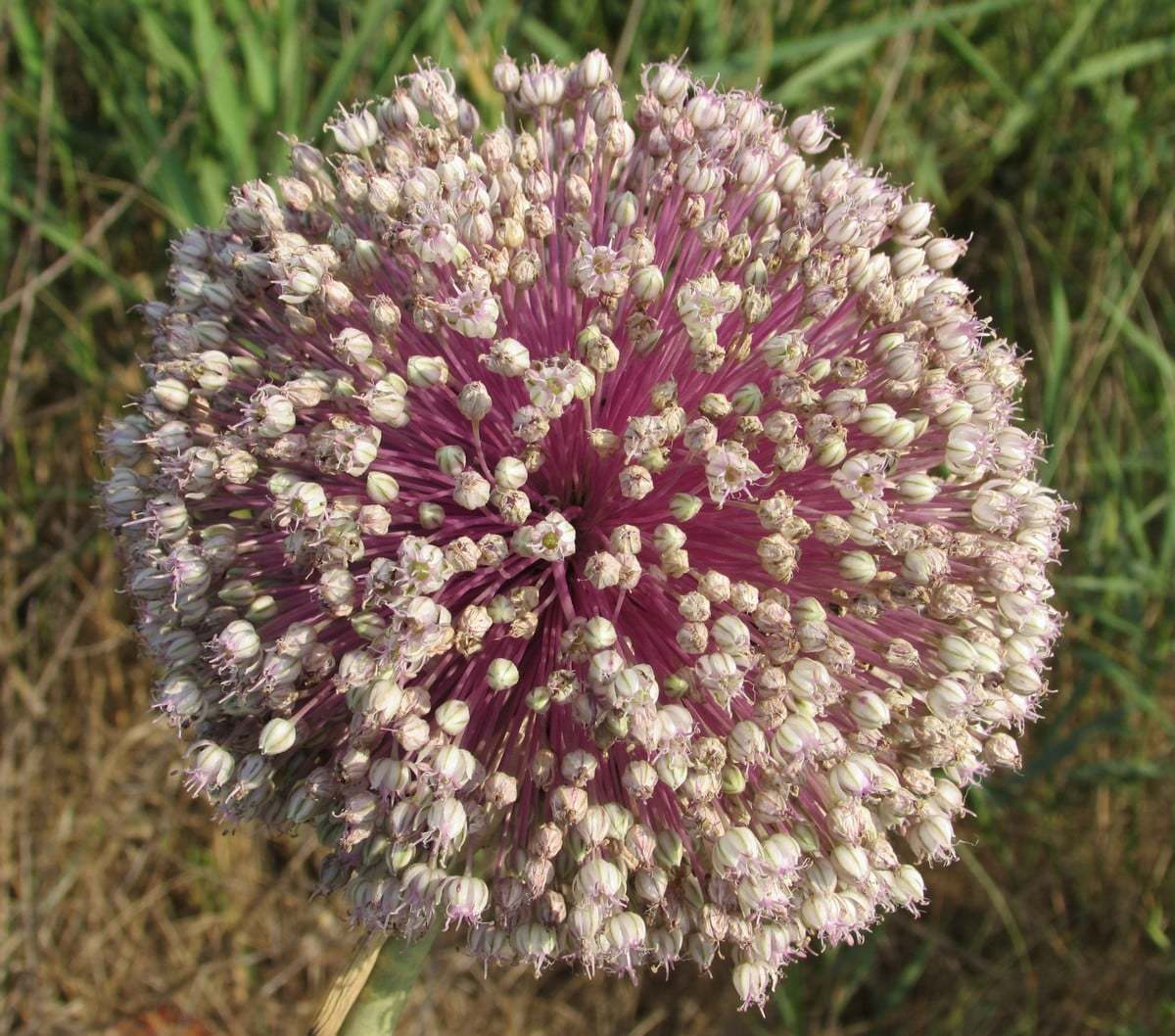
- Allium commutatum

Scientific classification
- Kingdom: Plantae
- Clade: Tracheophytes
- Clade: Angiosperms
- Clade: Monocots
- Order: Asparagales
- Family: Amaryllidaceae
- Subfamily: Allioideae
- Genus: Allium
- Subgenus: A. subg. Allium
- Species: A. commutatum

Binomial name
- Allium commutatum Guss.

Synonyms
- Allium aestivale J.J.Rodr.; Allium ampeloprasum var. commutatum (Guss.) Fiori; Allium bimetrale Gand.; Allium pruinosum Candargy; Allium rotundum subsp. commutatum (Guss.) Nyman; Allium wildii Heldr.

= Allium commutatum =

Species of flowering plant

Allium commutatum is a species of Mediterranean onions in the amaryllis family. Its native range extends from Corsica and Algeria to Turkey. It has also been introduced to northern Argentina.

Allium commutatum usually grows on rocky slopes overlooking the Mediterranean. Bulbs are resistant to salt and float, so they are very often dispersed by storms. Leaves wither and die before flowering time, when a tall scape appears bearing a large spherical umbel of purple flowers.
