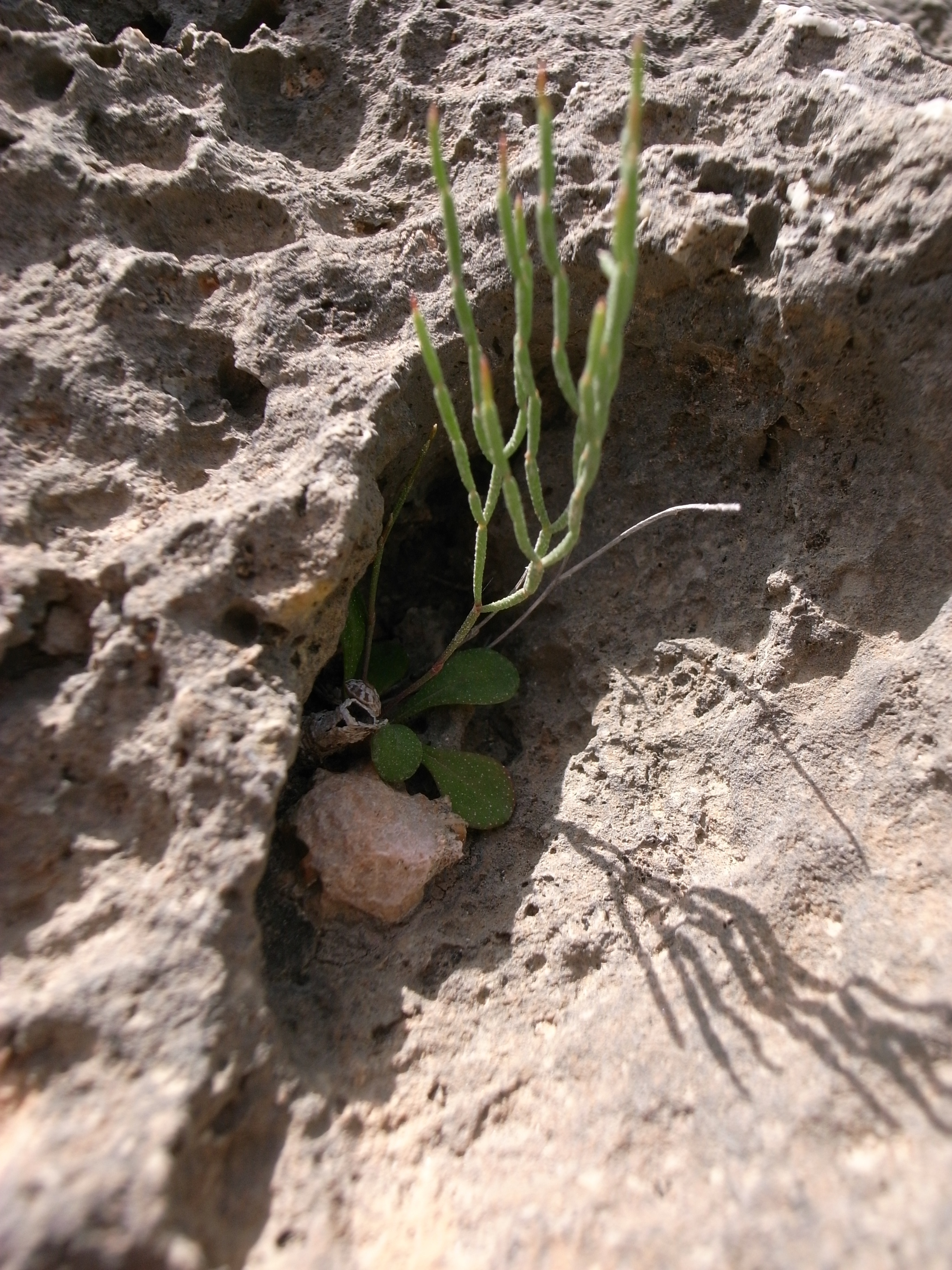

Scientific classification
- Kingdom: Plantae
- Clade: Tracheophytes
- Clade: Angiosperms
- Clade: Eudicots
- Order: Caryophyllales
- Family: Plumbaginaceae
- Genus: Limonium
- Species: L. melitense

Binomial name
- Limonium melitense Brullo

= Limonium melitense =

Species of plant

Limonium melitense is a species of plants in the family Plumbaginaceae (leadworts). It is endemic to Malta

== Sources ==
This article incorporates text from a free content work. Licensed under CC0 (license statement/permission). Text taken from Limonium melitense. Encyclopedia of Life.
