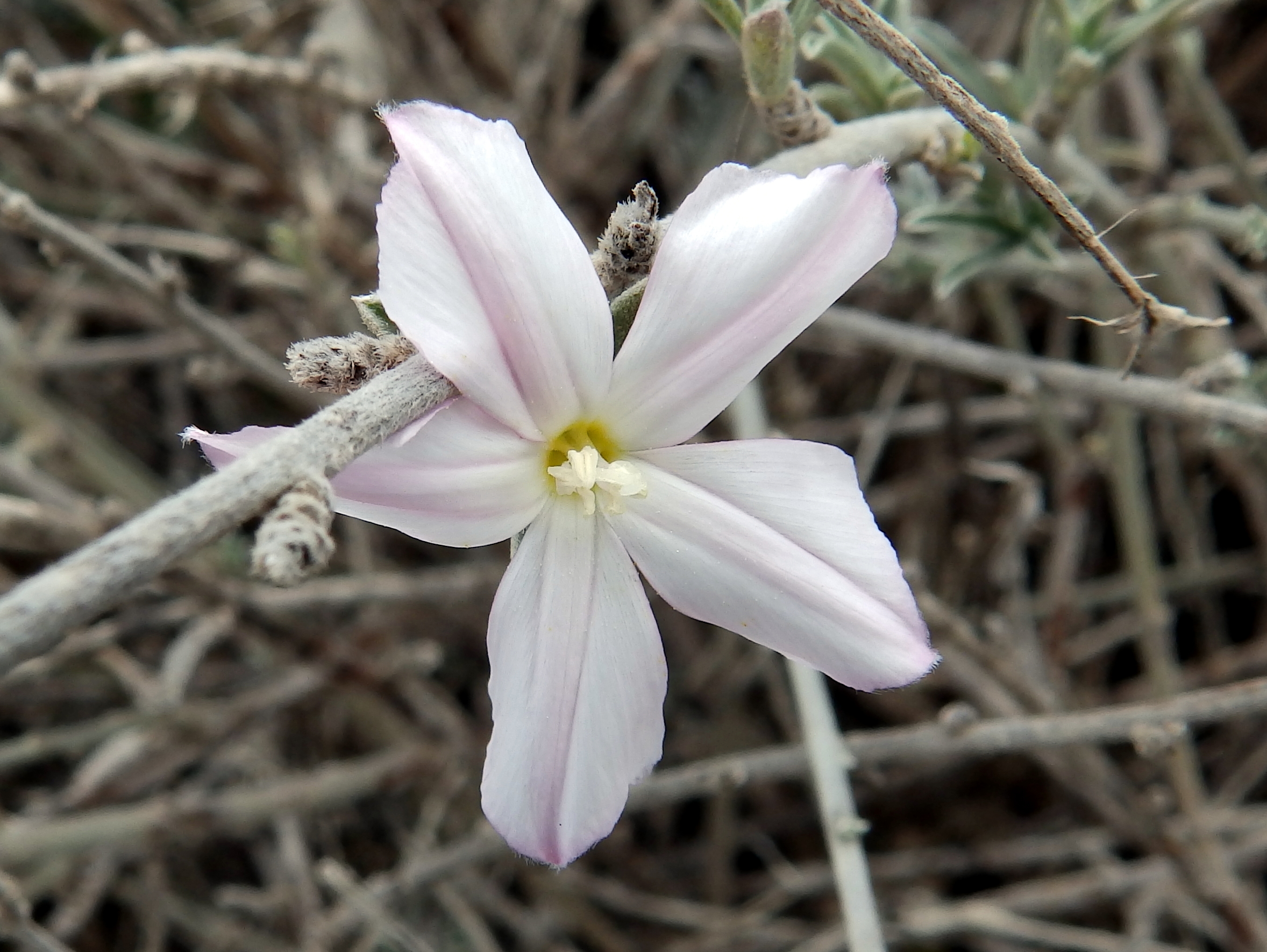

Scientific classification
- Kingdom: Plantae
- Clade: Tracheophytes
- Clade: Angiosperms
- Clade: Eudicots
- Clade: Asterids
- Order: Solanales
- Family: Convolvulaceae
- Genus: Convolvulus
- Species: C. oleifolius

Binomial name
- Convolvulus oleifolius Desr.

Synonyms
- Convolvulus linearis

= Convolvulus oleifolius =

Species of plant

Convolvulus oleifolius is a species of plant in the family Convolvulaceae.

== Sources ==
This article incorporates text from a free content work. Licensed under CC0 (license statement/permission). Text taken from Convolvulus oleifolius. Encyclopedia of Life.
