= List of Convolvulus species =

This is a list of the 228 accepted species in the genus Convolvulus.

== Convolvulus species ==
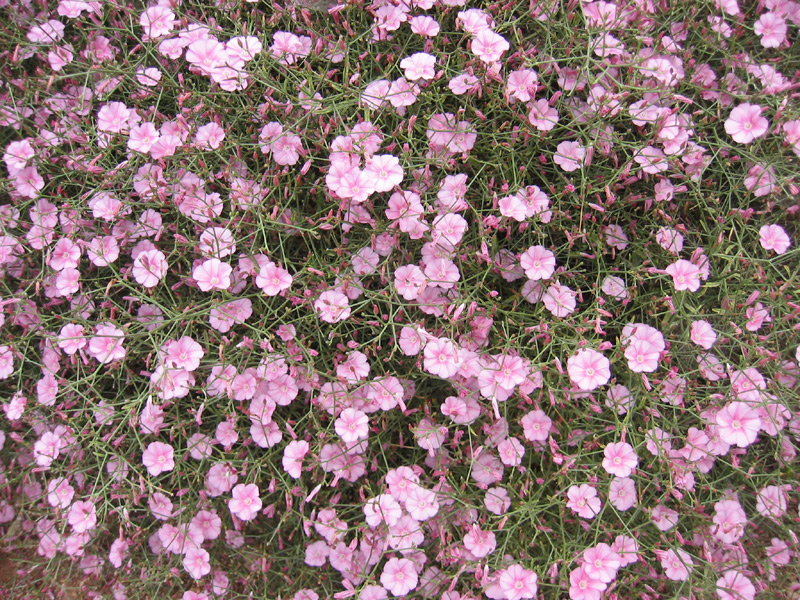
Convolvulus dorycnium

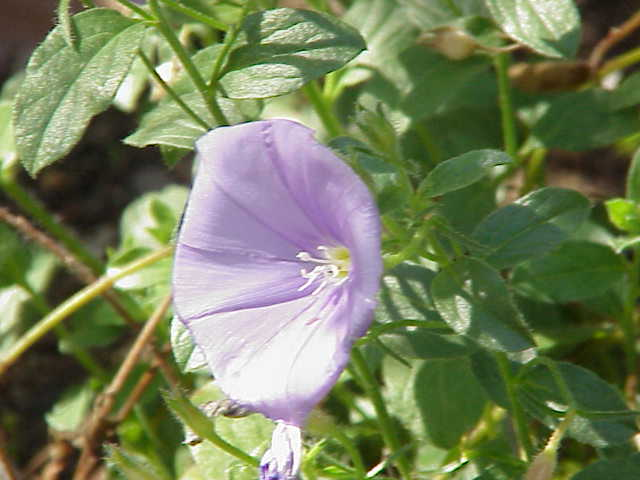
Convolvulus sabatius

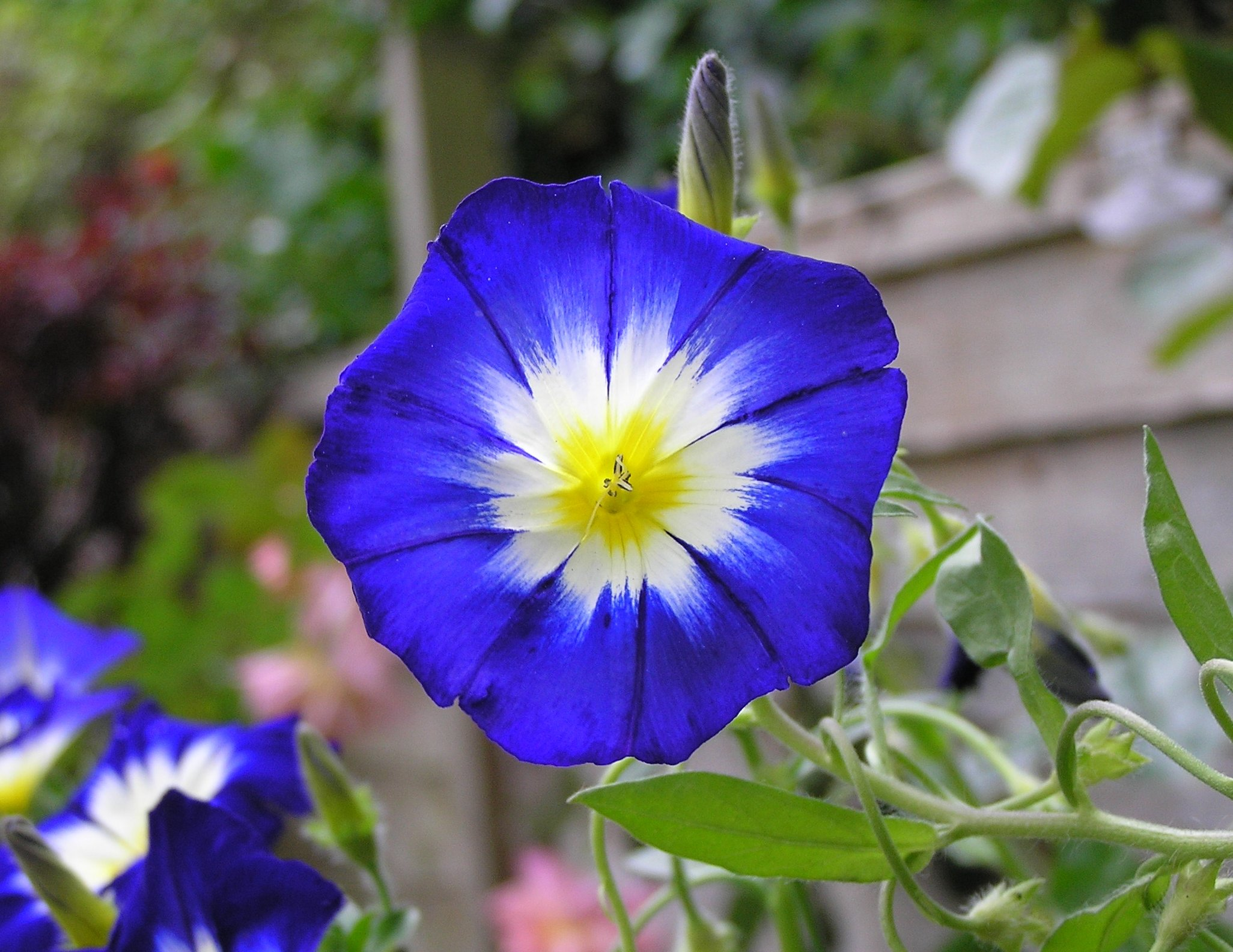
Cultivated Convolvulus tricolor

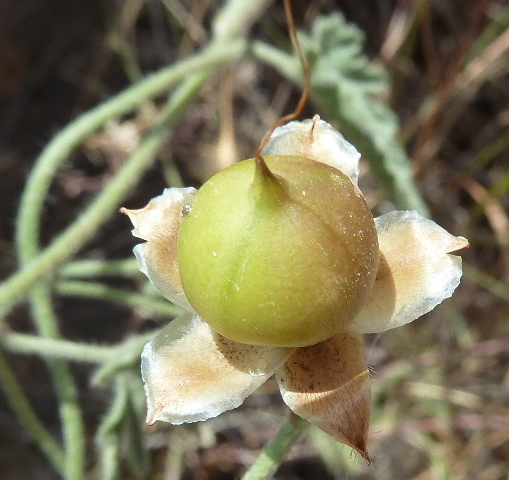
Convolvulus althaeoides

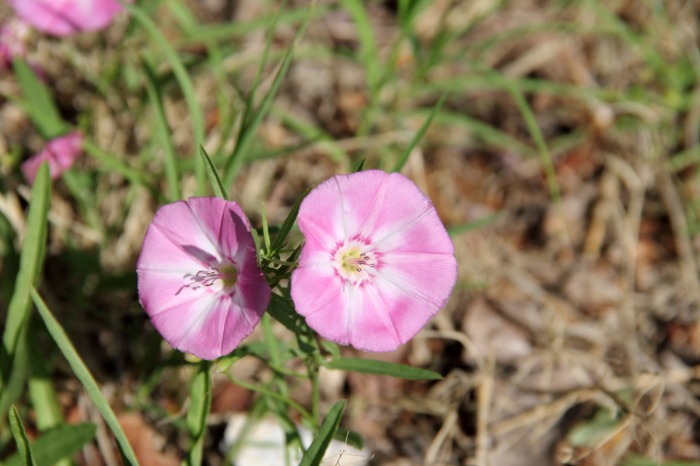
Convolvulus arvensis

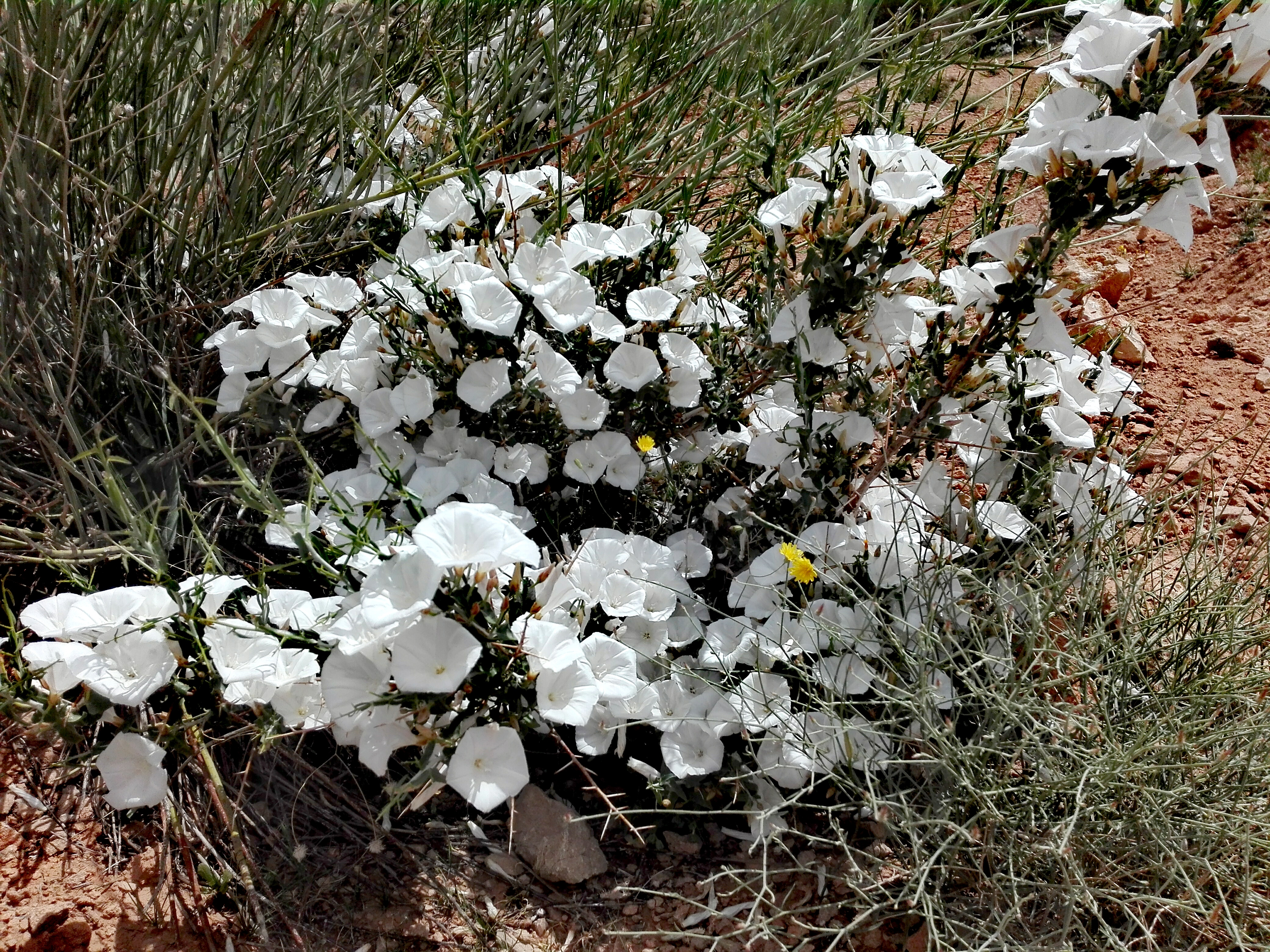
Convolvulus leiocalycinus

- Convolvulus acanthocladus
- Convolvulus aitchisonii
- Convolvulus althaeoides – mallow bindweed, mallow-leaf bindweed
- Convolvulus ammannii
- Convolvulus angustissimus
- Convolvulus argillicola
- Convolvulus argyracanthus
- Convolvulus argyrothamnos
- Convolvulus arvensis – lesser bindweed, field bindweed, common bindweed, white convolvulus, creeping jenny, perennial morning glory
- Convolvulus aschersonii
- Convolvulus assyricus
- Convolvulus asyrensis
- Convolvulus aucheri
- Convolvulus austroafricanus
- Convolvulus bazmanensis
- Convolvulus × beguinotii
- Convolvulus betonicifolius
- Convolvulus bidentatus
- Convolvulus bidrensis
- Convolvulus boedeckerianus
- Convolvulus boissieri
- Convolvulus bonariensis
- Convolvulus brummittii
- Convolvulus bullerianus
- Convolvulus calvertii
- Convolvulus canariensis
- Convolvulus cantabrica
- Convolvulus capensis
- Convolvulus capituliferus
- Convolvulus caput-medusae
- Convolvulus carduchorum
- Convolvulus carrii
- Convolvulus cassius
- Convolvulus cataonicus
- Convolvulus catesbeianus
- Convolvulus cephalophorus
- Convolvulus cephalopodus
- Convolvulus chilensis
- Convolvulus chinensis
- Convolvulus chondrilloides
- Convolvulus clementii
- Convolvulus cneorum – shrubby bindweed, silvery bindweed, silverbush
- Convolvulus coelesyriacus
- Convolvulus collinus
- Convolvulus commutatus
- Convolvulus crenatifolius
- Convolvulus crispifolius
- Convolvulus × cyprius
- Convolvulus demissus
- Convolvulus × despreauxii
- Convolvulus divaricatus
- Convolvulus dorycnium
- Convolvulus dregeanus
- Convolvulus dryadum
- Convolvulus × dubius
- Convolvulus durandoi
- Convolvulus elymaiticus
- Convolvulus ensifolius
- Convolvulus equitans – grey bindweed, Texas bindweed
- Convolvulus eremophilus
- Convolvulus erinaceus
- Convolvulus erubescens – blushing bindweed, pink bindweed, Australian bindweed
- Convolvulus euphraticus
- Convolvulus eyreanus
- Convolvulus farinosus
- Convolvulus fatmensis
- Convolvulus felix
- Convolvulus fernandesii
- Convolvulus floridus – guadil, morning-glory-tree, rhodium-wood
- Convolvulus fractosaxosus – shingle convolvulus
- Convolvulus fruticosus
- Convolvulus fruticulosus
- Convolvulus galapagensis
- Convolvulus galaticus
- Convolvulus galpinii
- Convolvulus germaniciae
- Convolvulus gharbensis
- Convolvulus glaouorum
- Convolvulus glomeratus
- Convolvulus gortschakovii
- Convolvulus goyderi
- Convolvulus gracillimus
- Convolvulus graminetinus
- Convolvulus grantii
- Convolvulus grigorjevii
- Convolvulus hamadae
- Convolvulus hamrinensis
- Convolvulus hasslerianus
- Convolvulus hermanniae
- Convolvulus hildebrandtii
- Convolvulus hirsutiflorus
- Convolvulus holosericeus
- Convolvulus hormodensis
- Convolvulus × howittiorum
- Convolvulus humilis
- Convolvulus hystrix
- Convolvulus incisodentatus
- Convolvulus iranicus
- Convolvulus japonicus – Japanese bindweed
- Convolvulus jefferyi
- Convolvulus jemensis
- Convolvulus jordanensis
- Convolvulus kilimandschari
- Convolvulus koieanus
- Convolvulus kossmatii
- Convolvulus kotschyanus
- Convolvulus krauseanus
- Convolvulus × krausii
- Convolvulus kurdistanicus
- Convolvulus laciniatus
- Convolvulus lanatus
- Convolvulus lanjouwii
- Convolvulus lanuginosus
- Convolvulus leiocalycinus
- Convolvulus leptocladus
- Convolvulus libanoticus
- Convolvulus lilloi
- Convolvulus lindbergii
- Convolvulus lineatus
- Convolvulus longipedicellatus
- Convolvulus longipes
- Convolvulus lopezsocasii
- Convolvulus × lucanus
- Convolvulus macounii
- Convolvulus macrostegius
- Convolvulus maireanus
- Convolvulus mairei
- Convolvulus malacophyllus
- Convolvulus massonii
- Convolvulus mazicum
- Convolvulus × melnikovae
- Convolvulus meonanthus
- Convolvulus microcalyx
- Convolvulus microsepalus
- Convolvulus mollissimus
- Convolvulus montanus
- Convolvulus multifidus
- Convolvulus namaquensis
- Convolvulus naniflorus
- Convolvulus natalensis
- Convolvulus nyctagineus
- Convolvulus occidentalis
- Convolvulus ocellatus
- Convolvulus oleifolius
- Convolvulus oppositifolius
- Convolvulus oreophilus
- Convolvulus oxyphyllus
- Convolvulus oxysepalus
- Convolvulus palaestinus
- Convolvulus palustris
- Convolvulus peirsonii
- Convolvulus pellitus
- Convolvulus peninsularis
- Convolvulus pentapetaloides
- Convolvulus perraudieri
- Convolvulus persicus
- Convolvulus phrygius
- Convolvulus pilosellifolius – soft bindweed
- Convolvulus pitardii
- Convolvulus × platigena
- Convolvulus prostratus
- Convolvulus pseudocantabrica
- Convolvulus × pseudocompactus
- Convolvulus pseudoscammonia
- Convolvulus purpuratus
- Convolvulus pyrophilus
- Convolvulus pyrrhotrichus
- Convolvulus randii
- Convolvulus rectangularis
- Convolvulus recurvatus
- Convolvulus remotus
- Convolvulus reticulatus
- Convolvulus rhyniospermus
- Convolvulus rottlerianus
- Convolvulus rufescens
- Convolvulus sabatius – blue rock bindweed, ground blue-convolvulus
- Convolvulus sagittatus
- Convolvulus sarmentosus
- Convolvulus sarothrocladus
- Convolvulus scammonia – scammony
- Convolvulus × scanicus
- Convolvulus schimperi
- Convolvulus schirazianus
- Convolvulus schulzei
- Convolvulus scindicus
- Convolvulus scoparius – lignum rhodium, rhodium-wood
- Convolvulus scopulatus
- Convolvulus secundus
- Convolvulus selloi
- Convolvulus semhaensis
- Convolvulus sepium
- Convolvulus sericocephalus
- Convolvulus sericophyllus
- Convolvulus siculus
- Convolvulus silvaticus
- Convolvulus similis
- Convolvulus simulans
- Convolvulus sinuatodentatus
- Convolvulus socotranus
- Convolvulus soldanella
- Convolvulus spicatus
- Convolvulus spinifer
- Convolvulus spinosus
- Convolvulus spithamaeus
- Convolvulus stachydifolius
- Convolvulus stapfii
- Convolvulus stebbinsii
- Convolvulus stenocladus
- Convolvulus steppicola
- Convolvulus subacaulis
- Convolvulus subsericeus
- Convolvulus subspathulatus
- Convolvulus suendermannii
- Convolvulus supinus
- Convolvulus tedmoorei
- Convolvulus thomsonii
- Convolvulus thunbergii
- Convolvulus trabutianus
- Convolvulus tragacanthoides
- Convolvulus tricolor – dwarf convolvulus, dwarf morning glory
- Convolvulus truncatus
- Convolvulus tschimganicus
- Convolvulus tuguriorum – climbing convolvulus, New Zealand bindweed
- Convolvulus tujuntauensis
- Convolvulus × turcicus
- Convolvulus turrillianus
- Convolvulus ulicinus
- Convolvulus urosepalus
- Convolvulus valentinus
- Convolvulus vanzuukiae
- Convolvulus verdcourtianus
- Convolvulus verecundus – trailing bindweed, tussock bindweed
- Convolvulus vidalii
- Convolvulus virgatus
- Convolvulus vollesenii
- Convolvulus volubilis
- Convolvulus waitaha – grass convolvulus
- Convolvulus wallichianus
- Convolvulus wimmerensis
- Convolvulus xanthopotamicus
