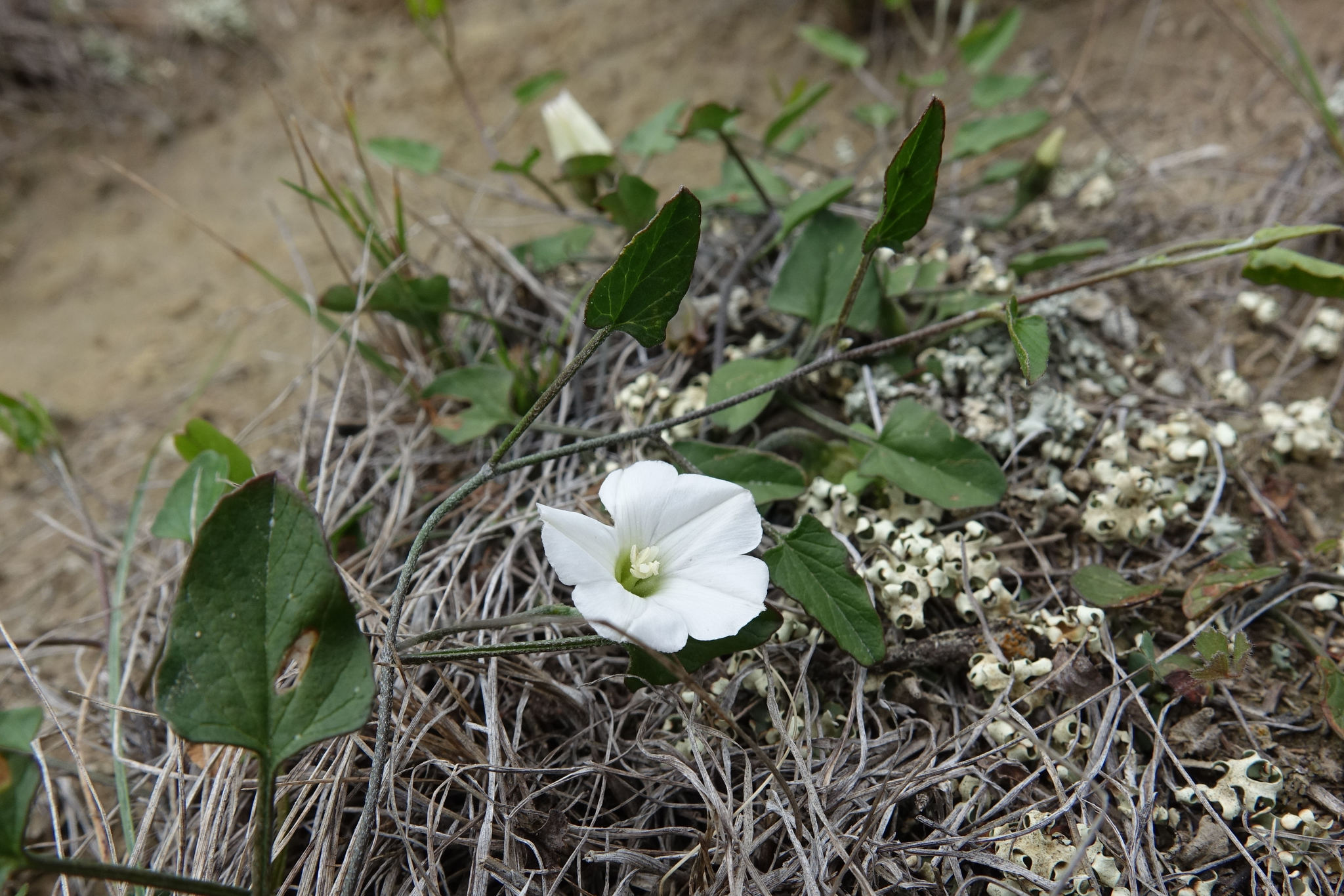
- Convolvulus waitaha near Kurow

Conservation status
- Not Threatened (NZ TCS)

Scientific classification
- Kingdom: Plantae
- Clade: Tracheophytes
- Clade: Angiosperms
- Clade: Eudicots
- Clade: Asterids
- Order: Solanales
- Family: Convolvulaceae
- Genus: Convolvulus
- Species: C. waitaha

Binomial name
- Convolvulus waitaha (Sykes) Heenan, Molloy & de Lange

= Convolvulus waitaha =

Species of flowering plant

Convolvulus waitaha, commonly known as grassland convolvulus, is a species of flowering plant in the family Convolvulaceae. A perennial herb, it is endemic to New Zealand. Its range mainly covers the South Island, but it is also sporadically present in the North Island. It is found in various habitats, such as tussock grasslands and pastures. It was first described in a 2003 article in the New Zealand Journal of Botany. Its 2023 assessment in the New Zealand Threat Classification System was "Not Threatened".

== Description ==
Convolvulus waitaha is a perennial herb in the family Convolvulaceae. The stems can reach a length of up to 800 millimetres (31 inches), which may be covered with hairs. Leaves are found in a rosette arrangement. Leaves are arranged alternately on the stems and measure 6–17 × 5–12 mm long. They range from triangular to oval or broadly oblong in shape and are green in colour. The leaf surface is usually smooth. Leaf edges are smooth to slightly wavy.

The pedecils are 8–18 mm long. The sepals are 3.6–4 × 2.1–2.6 mm long. The flowers are white, about 10–16 mm wide when open. The centre of the petals is pale green. The fruits are found in seed capsules which are 5–6 × 5–6.5 mm long, and contain two to four seeds. The seeds are 3.1–3.9 × 2.3–3.3 mm long, and brown to greyish in colour. C. waitaha has a diploid chromosome count of 22.

== Taxonomy ==
The genus Convolvulus was established by the European botanist Carl Linnaeus in 1753. C. waitaha was first described in a 2003 article in the New Zealand Journal of Botany by the botanists Peter Brian Heenan, Brian Molloy, and Peter de Lange. The species was previously treated as a subspecies of Convolvulus verecundus. As of 2026, there are 228 species of the genus Convolvulus accepted by the Plants of the World Online taxonomic database. The genus has a worldwide distribution. A monograph of the genus was conducted in 2015. Nepomuceno et al. (2025) combined the genus Calystegia to Convolvulus.

=== Etymology ===
The etymology (word origin) of C. waitaha's genus name, Convolvulus, comes from the Latin convolvere, meaning "to twine around". The specific epithet (second part of the scientific name), waitaha, is a Māori language word meaning 'backwater'. It comes from wai, meaning 'water', and 'taha', meaning "to pass to one side". The species is commonly known as grass convolvulus.

== Distribution ==
Convolvulus waitaha is endemic to New Zealand. Its range sporadically covers the eastern North Island and South Island. There is a historical record of the plant being present in Hawke's Bay. C. waitaha is found in numerous localities along the Cook Strait. In the South Island, C. waitaha is found from the Marlborough Region south to Otago. Its 2023 assessment in the New Zealand Threat Classification System was "Not Threatened".

=== Habitat ===
Convolvulus waitaha is found in coastal to lowland environments, reaching 500 m (1,600 ft) above sea level at maximum elevation. It is found in various habitats, including tussock grasslands, browsed pastures, banks, rocky slopes, and gravelly areas.

== Ecology ==
The members of the Convolvulaceae are primarily pollinated by insects. The seeds of C. waitaha are dispersed by the wind.

== Works cited ==
Journals

- Cronk, Q.C.B.; Clarke, G.C.S. (1981). "Convolvulaceae". Review of Palaeobotany and Palynology. 33 (1): 117–135. doi:10.1016/0034-6667(81)90086-5.
- Heenan, P. B.; Molloy, B. P. J.; De Lange, P. J. (2003). "Species of Convolvulus (Convolvulaceae) endemic to New Zealand". New Zealand Journal of Botany. 41 (3): 447–457. doi:10.1080/0028825X.2003.9512862. ISSN 0028-825X.
- Nepomuceno, Silmara; Fay, Michael F; Simões, Ana Rita Giraldes; Buril, Maria Teresa (21 April 2025). "Character reconstruction and re-circumscription of the genus Convolvulus L. (Convolvulaceae)". Botanical Journal of the Linnean Society. 209 (4). Oxford University Press (OUP): 359–380. doi:10.1093/botlinnean/boaf023. ISSN 0024-4074.
- Wood, John; Williams, Bethany R.M.; Mitchell, Thomas C.; Carine, Mark; Harris, David; Scotland, Robert (2015). "A foundation monograph of Convolvulus L. (Convolvulaceae)". PhytoKeys. 51: 1–282. doi:10.3897/phytokeys.51.7104. ISSN 1314-2003.

Websites

- De Lange, Peter (2013). "Convolvulus waitaha". New Zealand Plant Conservation Network. Archived from the original on 30 April 2025.
- "Convolvulus waitaha (Sykes) Heenan, Molloy & de Lange". Plants of the World Online. Archived from the original on 9 May 2025 – via Royal Botanic Gardens, Kew.
- "Convolvulus L." Plants of the World Online. Archived from the original on 8 June 2025 – via Royal Botanic Gardens, Kew.
