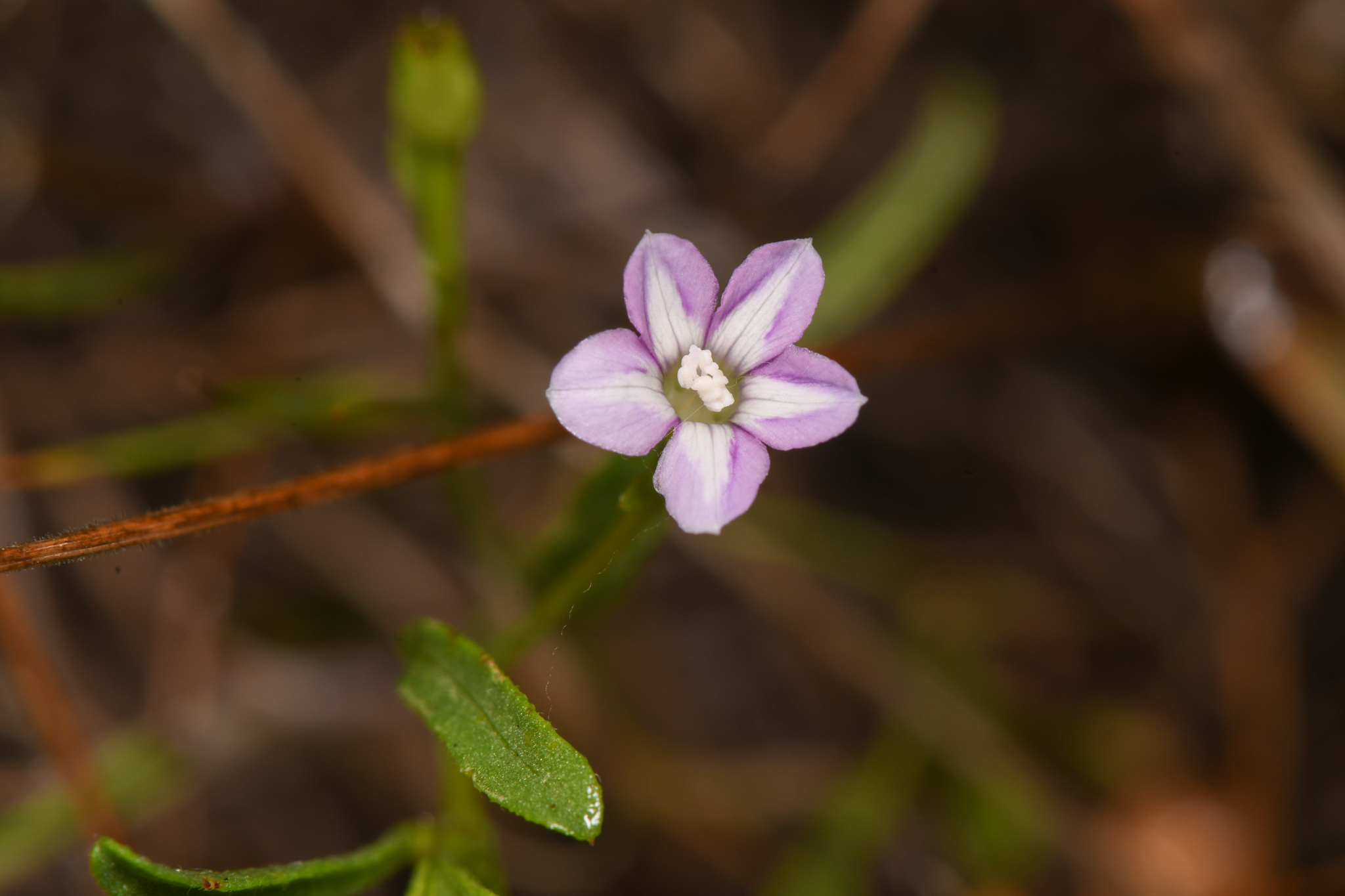

Conservation status
- Apparently Secure (NatureServe)

Scientific classification
- Kingdom: Plantae
- Clade: Tracheophytes
- Clade: Angiosperms
- Clade: Eudicots
- Clade: Asterids
- Order: Solanales
- Family: Convolvulaceae
- Genus: Convolvulus
- Species: C. simulans

Binomial name
- Convolvulus simulans L.M. Perry (1931)

Synonyms
- Breweria minima A. Gray (1882)

= Convolvulus simulans =

Species of flowering plant

Convolvulus simulans is a species of annual plant in the morning glory family known as the small-flowered morning-glory and small-flowered bindweed. It is an inconspicuous vining plant that is characterized by tiny pale pink or pale blue bell-shaped flowers. It is typically restricted to clay and serpentine substrates in annual grassland, coastal sage scrub and chaparral habitats. This species is native to Arizona, California, and Baja California. Some taxonomies place this species under Convolvulus equitans.

== Description ==
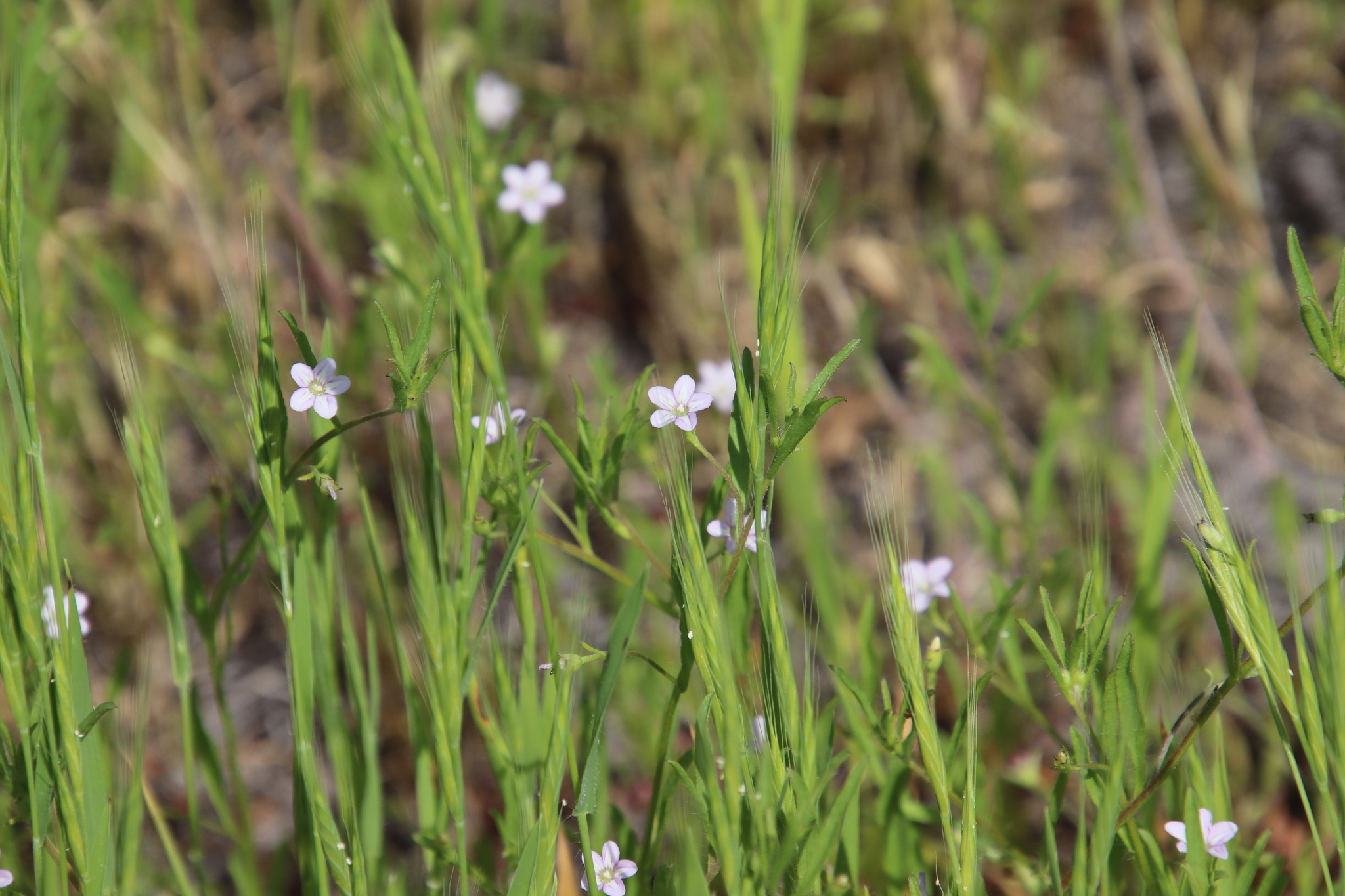
In habitat

This species is an annual herb with a vining or spreading habit. It does not twine around other shrubs, but is more decumbent and sometimes loops its stems around other plants. The stems are less than 1.5 mm (0.059 in) in diameter and may spread across the ground for up to 40 cm (16 in). The leaves are arranged alternately and taper towards a weakly defined petiole that attaches them to the stem. The leaves are shaped narrowly oblanceolate to almost linear, and have smooth margins. The herbage is covered with small, soft hairs.

The flowers are solitary, with the inflorescences consisting of 1-flowered cymes that emerge from the axils of the upper leaves of the plant. The peduncle is short, about 3–20 mm (0.12–0.79 in) long, and may become sharply nodding when in fruit. Lining the peduncle 2–5 mm (0.079–0.197 in) below the calyx are small bracts, measuring 3–7 mm (0.12–0.28 in) long, and shaped linear or narrowly oblanceolate.

On the flower, the calyx lobes measure 3–4 mm (0.12–0.16 in) long, and shaped oblong-ovate. The bell-shaped corolla is about 0.6 cm (0.24 in) long, divided into 5 lobes (essentially petals). The lobes are white or pale-pinkish, with blue or lavender stripes. Flowering is from April to June The fruit is a round 4-seeded capsule.

== Distribution and habitat ==
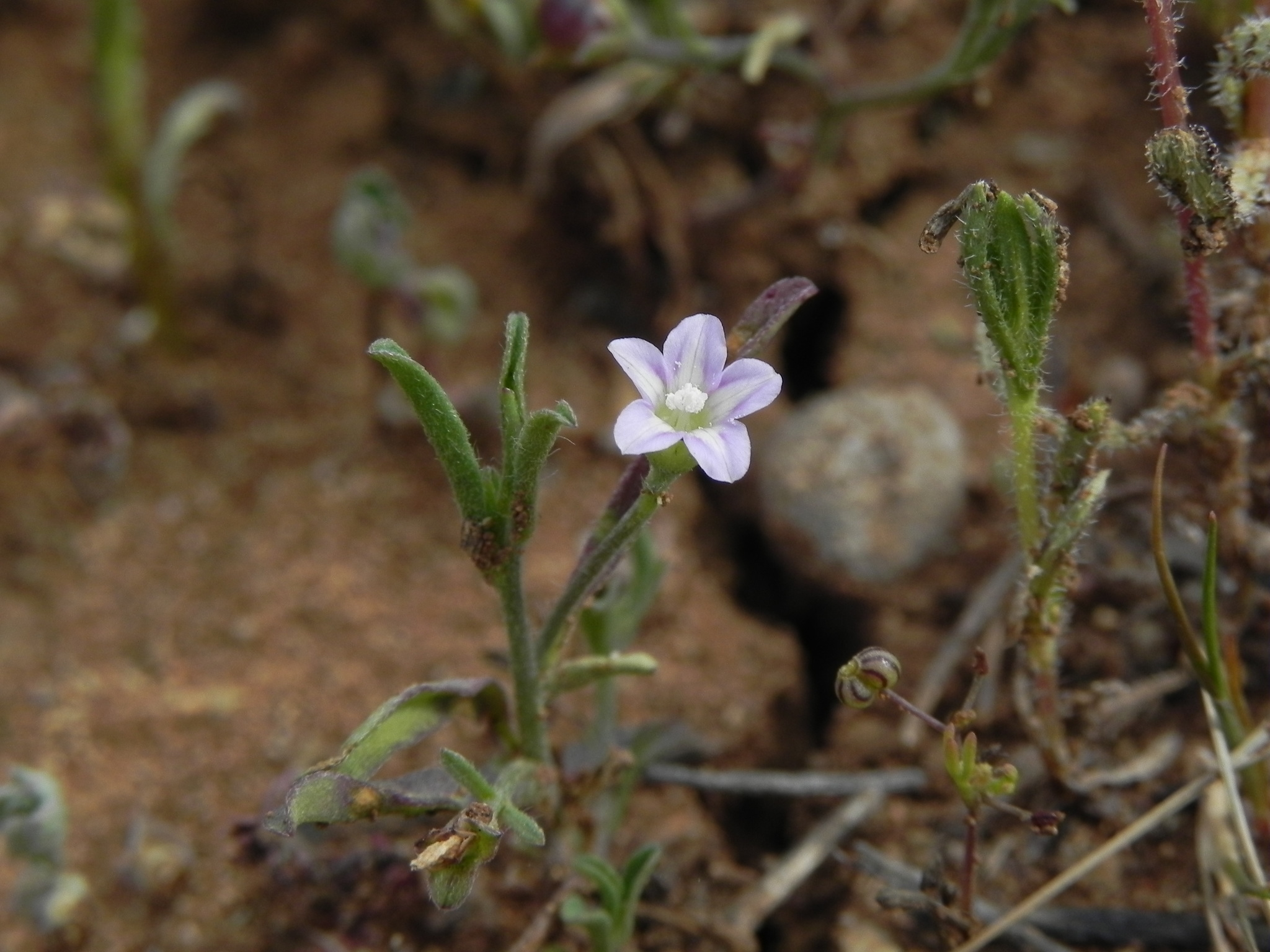
Flower and herbage in habitat. Non-native Erodium species on the right

This plant is native to the United States and Mexico, and is found within the boundaries of Arizona, California, and Baja California. In Arizona, this species is found in Gila County, in the Tonto Basin. In California, this species is found in the southern foothills of the Sierra Nevada, the San Francisco Bay Area, the South Coast Ranges, the Channel Islands, and is most densely distributed in southern California. In Baja California, this species is distributed in the northwestern part of the state, south to El Rosario.

This species is primarily associated with heavy, cracking, and friable clay substrates, but also more rarely on serpentine, and is often found in Vernal pools. Habitats it is usually associated with include annual grasslands, coastal sage scrub, and chaparral, at elevations of about 30–875 m (98–2,871 ft).

== See also ==
Associated species in the friable clay habitats in southern California and Baja California include:

- Acanthomintha illicifolia
- Plantago rhodosperma
- California macrophylla
