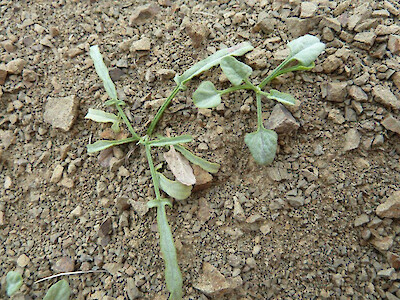
- Convolvulus fractosaxosus on scree

Conservation status
- Naturally Uncommon (NZ TCS)

Scientific classification
- Kingdom: Plantae
- Clade: Embryophytes
- Clade: Tracheophytes
- Clade: Spermatophytes
- Clade: Angiosperms
- Clade: Eudicots
- Clade: Asterids
- Order: Solanales
- Family: Convolvulaceae
- Genus: Convolvulus
- Species: C. fractosaxosus

Binomial name
- Convolvulus fractosaxosus Petrie

= Convolvulus fractosaxosus =

Species of flowering plant

Convolvulus fractosaxosus, commonly known as shingle convolvulus, is a species of flowering plant in the family Convolvulaceae. A perennial herb, C. fractosaxosus is endemic to New Zealand's South Island. It can be present in tussock grasslands and rocky areas, such as scree. Its 2023 conservation status in the New Zealand Threat Classification System was "At Risk – Naturally Uncommon ".

== Taxonomy ==
The plant was first described by Donald Petrie in 1913. The species is comparable to the Australian species Convolvulus angustissimus. The genus name, Convolvulus, comes from the Latin convolvere, meaning "to twine around".

== Description ==
Convolvulus fractosaxosus is a perennial herb which grows in a creeping manner, with stems that reach 30 centimetres (12 inches) in length. The leaves are petiolate and are variable in colour and shape, but are usually triangular or egg-shaped. The flowers are found on stalks which are 2–6 cm (0.79–2.36 in) long. They have a white corolla with pink stripes along the centre of each petal.
