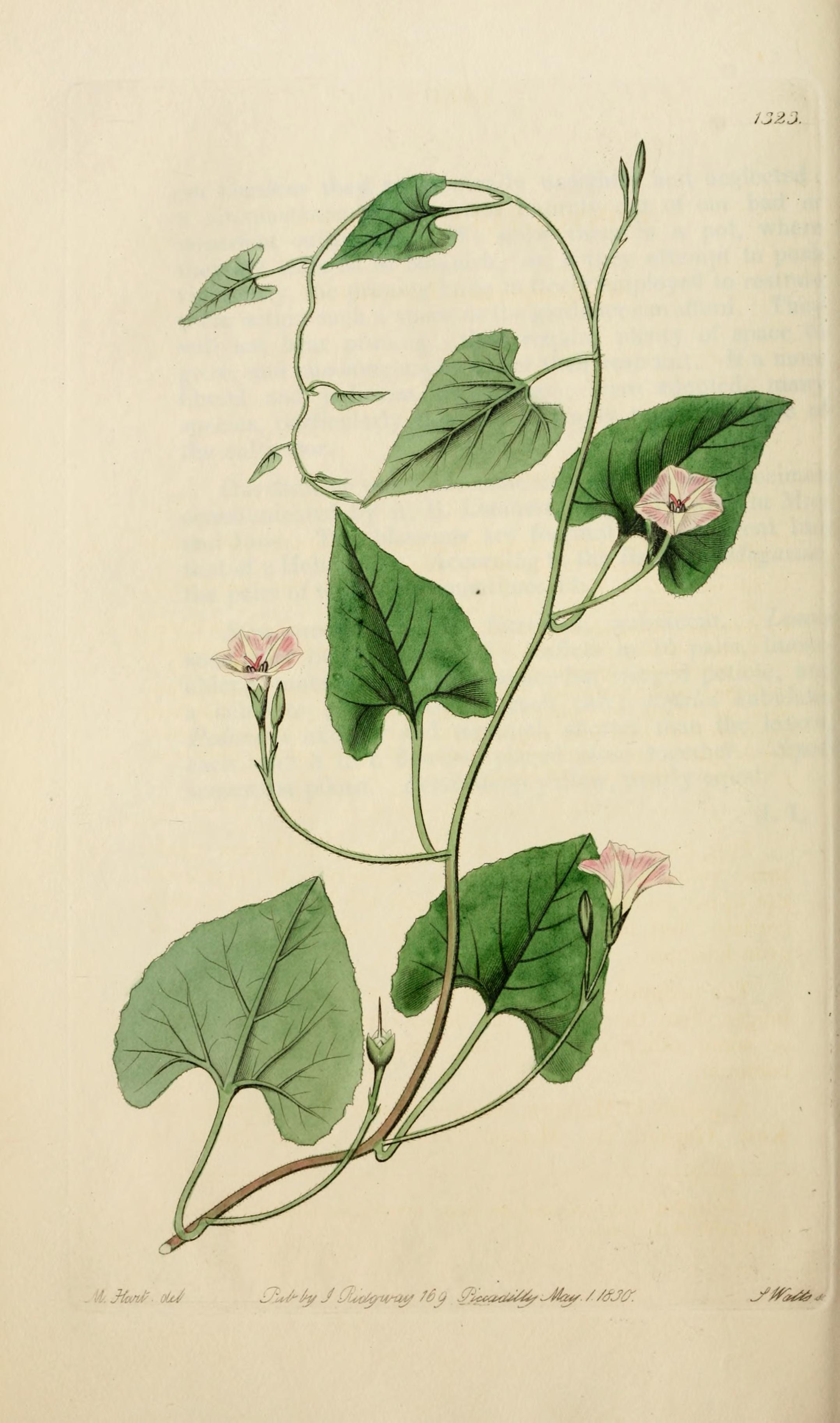

Scientific classification
- Kingdom: Plantae
- Clade: Tracheophytes
- Clade: Angiosperms
- Clade: Eudicots
- Clade: Asterids
- Order: Solanales
- Family: Convolvulaceae
- Genus: Convolvulus
- Species: C. farinosus

Binomial name
- Convolvulus farinosus L.

Synonyms
- Convolvulus cordifolius Thunb.; Convolvulus hilsenbergianus Rendle; Convolvulus micranthus Willd. ex Spreng.; Convolvulus penicillatus A.Rich.; Convolvulus quinqueflorus Vahl; Convolvulus schweinfurthii Engl.; Convolvulus sprengelii Choisy; Convolvulus variegatus Sa'ad; Podaletra farinosa (L.) Raf.

= Convolvulus farinosus =

Species of morning glory

Convolvulus farinosus is a species of plant in the family Convolvulaceae. It is native to sub-Saharan Africa.
