= Convolvulus recurvatus =

Scientific classification
- Kingdom: Plantae
- Clade: Tracheophytes
- Clade: Angiosperms
- Clade: Eudicots
- Clade: Asterids
- Order: Solanales
- Family: Convolvulaceae
- Genus: Convolvulus
- Species: C. recurvatus

Binomial name
- Convolvulus recurvatus R.W.Johnson

Species of bindweed

Convolvulus recurvatus is a herb in the family Convolvulaceae.

The perennial herb with a low trailing habit. It blooms between October and August producing pink-white flowers.

It is found on floodplains, along drainage lines and in other low-lying areas in the Goldfields-Esperance region of Western Australia where it grows in sandy-loamy soils.
