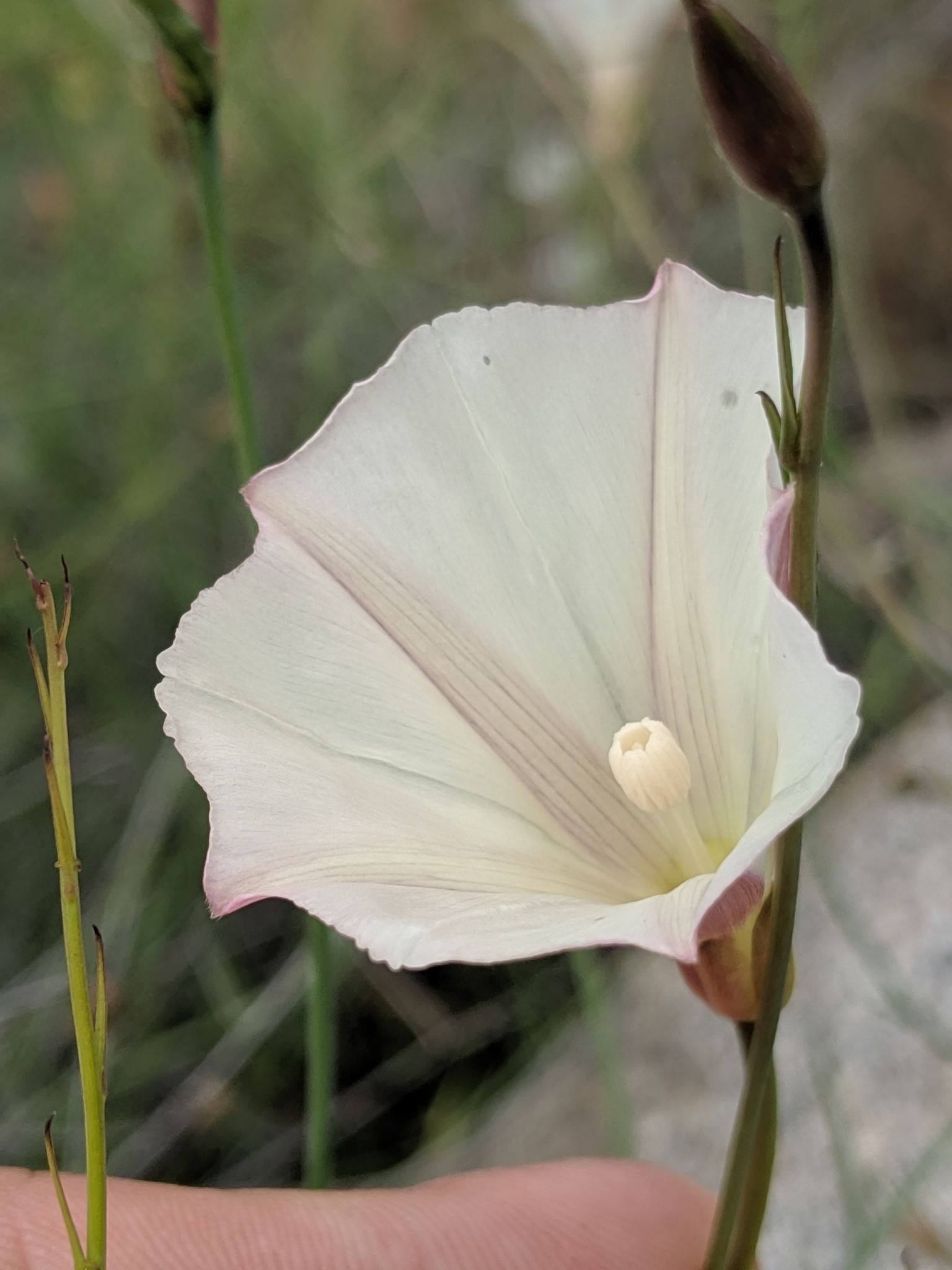

Conservation status
- Apparently Secure (NatureServe)

Scientific classification
- Kingdom: Plantae
- Clade: Tracheophytes
- Clade: Angiosperms
- Clade: Eudicots
- Clade: Asterids
- Order: Solanales
- Family: Convolvulaceae
- Genus: Convolvulus
- Species: C. longipes

Binomial name
- Convolvulus longipes S.Watson

Synonyms
- Calystegia longipes (S.Watson) Brummitt

= Convolvulus longipes =

Species of morning glory

Convolvulus longipes is a species of morning glory known by the common name Paiute false bindweed.

It is native to the southwestern United States from California to Utah, where it grows in many types of habitat.

== Description ==
It is a woody perennial herb growing into a bushy form up to a meter tall, with many spreading and erect, twining branches. The small leaves are linear to narrowly lance-shaped and sometimes have small lobes divided from the sides. The inflorescence is a solitary flower on a long peduncle up to 20 centimeters in length. The morning glory flower at the end is a white to pale lavender or pinkish bloom 2 or 3 centimeters wide.
