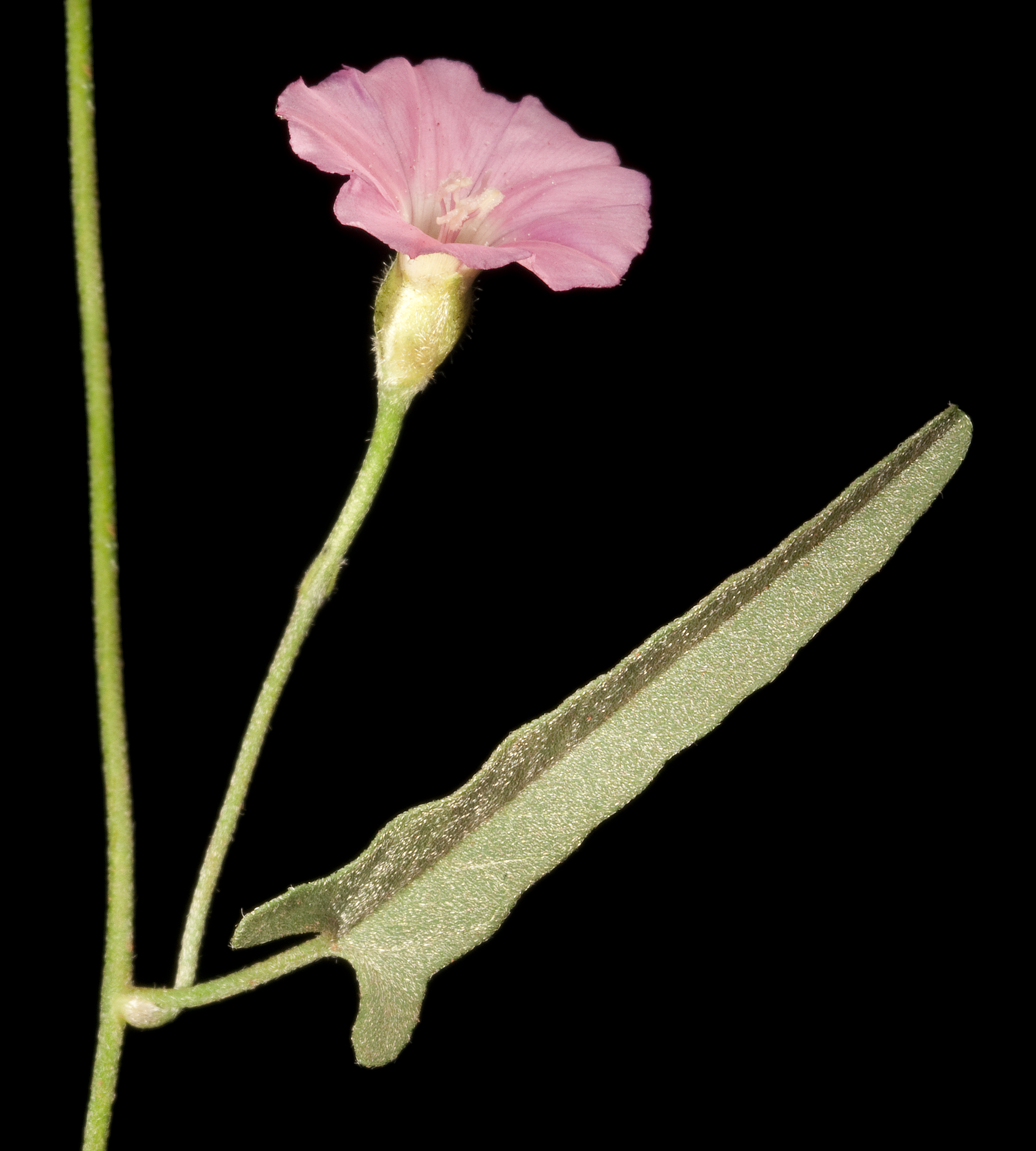

Scientific classification
- Kingdom: Plantae
- Clade: Tracheophytes
- Clade: Angiosperms
- Clade: Eudicots
- Clade: Asterids
- Order: Solanales
- Family: Convolvulaceae
- Genus: Convolvulus
- Species: C. remotus

Binomial name
- Convolvulus remotus R.Br.

= Convolvulus remotus =

Species of bindweed

Convolvulus remotus commonly known as bindweed, is a flowering plant in the family Convolvulaceae. It is a perennial climber with pink flowers and grows in all mainland states of Australia and the Northern Territory.

== Description ==
Convolvulus remotus is a twining, perennial, terete, hairy, flattened stems, leaves oval-shaped or oblong, 1–8 cm (0.39–3.15 in) long, 5–40 mm (0.20–1.57 in) wide, apex pointed or rounded and a petiole 2–20 mm (0.079–0.787 in) long. Flowers are in a cluster of 2-3 or borne singly in leaf axils, funnel-shaped, pink, 8–13 mm (0.31–0.51 in) long, 8–20 mm (0.31–0.79 in) in diameter, peduncle slender, 5–42 mm (0.20–1.65 in) long with appressed hairs. Flowering may occur anytime of the year and the fruit is a smooth, globe-shaped capsule 5.5–8.5 mm (0.22–0.33 in) long and 5–7 mm (0.20–0.28 in) in diameter.

== Taxonomy and naming ==
Convolvulus remotus was first formally described in 1810 by Robert Brown and the description was published in Prodromus florae Novae Hollandiae. The specific epithet (remotus) means 'scattered or remote in reference to its location'.

== Distribution and habitat ==
Bindweed is found on a variety of soils, including clay and sand, scrubland, woodlands, floodplains and gullies in New South Wales, Western Australia, South Australia, Queensland, Victoria and the Northern Territory.
