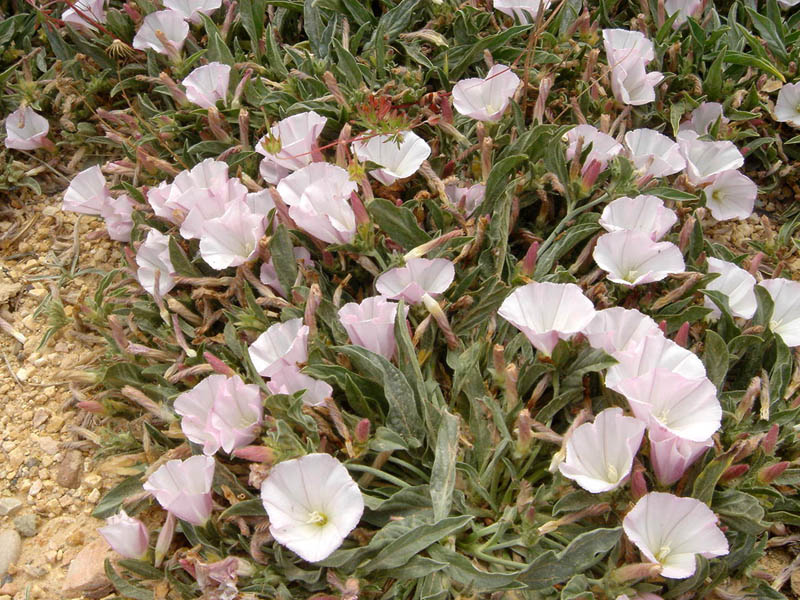

Scientific classification
- Kingdom: Plantae
- Clade: Tracheophytes
- Clade: Angiosperms
- Clade: Eudicots
- Clade: Asterids
- Order: Solanales
- Family: Convolvulaceae
- Genus: Convolvulus
- Species: C. lineatus

Binomial name
- Convolvulus lineatus L.

Synonyms
- Convolvulus besseri Spreng.; Convolvulus gerardii Roem. & Schult.; Convolvulus intermedius Loisel.; Convolvulus nitens K.Koch; Convolvulus spicaefolius Desr.; Convolvulus tshegemensis Galushko; Convolvulus spicifolius Desr.

= Convolvulus lineatus =

Species of plant

Convolvulus lineatus, commonly called narrow-leaved bindweed, is a species of perennial herb in the family Convolvulaceae. They have a self-supporting growth form and simple, broad leaves. Individuals can grow to 25 cm tall.

== Description ==
Convolvulus lineatus is a perennial hemicryptophyte (a plant with its overwintering buds at soil level), characterised by woody stocks and low-growing, trailing herbaceous stems. It typically grows to a height of 25 cm. The plant reproduces vegetatively through rhizomes (underground stems), which enable it to spread in the immediate vicinity, often forming small clonal patches.

The leaves are linear to elliptical or oblanceolate (spoon-shaped with the broadest part toward the tip) and distinctly silver-sericeous (covered with soft, silky hairs) on both surfaces, giving the plant its characteristic silvery appearance. The flowers are funnel-shaped and have been observed to be protandrous, meaning the male reproductive parts mature before the female parts, a mechanism that promotes cross-pollination.

== Distribution and habitat ==
Convolvulus lineatus has a wide geographic range, occurring in North Africa, Southern Europe, Turkey, Caucasia, Syria, Iran, and eastwards to Turkmenistan. It is typically found at altitudes between 0–50 metres above sea level. In Cyprus, the plant is restricted to the Akrotiri Peninsula, where it grows primarily south of the Salt Lake of Akrotiri (also known as Limassol Salt Lake), with scattered individuals recorded throughout the Akrotiri village area.

== Pollination ecology ==
Studies of C. lineatus have documented various insect visitors to its flowers, primarily beetles (Coleoptera) and bees and wasps (Hymenoptera). These insects feed on the plant's pollen and, during their movements, transfer pollen from the anthers to the stigmas, potentially serving as pollinators. When disturbed, some of these insects exhibit thanatosis (playing dead), but still contribute to pollination as pollen attaches to their bodies during these interactions.

== Conservation status ==
Convolvulus lineatus is classified as Vulnerable (VU) according to the Red Data Book of the flora of Cyprus, indicating it faces a high risk of extinction in the wild. The primary threats to this species include uncontrolled access to its habitat, urban development, and vegetation clearing along roadways.

Research conducted between 2022 and 2024 estimated the population in the Akrotiri Peninsula at between 5,000–10,000 individuals, representing a significant increase from roughly 2,000 individuals recorded in 2007.

As a threatened species, C. lineatus is being monitored as part of broader conservation initiatives in the Akrotiri Peninsula. These efforts include population surveys and habitat protection measures to safeguard this vulnerable plant.
