= Convolvulus oxyphyllus =

Scientific classification
- Kingdom: Plantae
- Clade: Embryophytes
- Clade: Tracheophytes
- Clade: Angiosperms
- Clade: Eudicots
- Clade: Asterids
- Order: Solanales
- Family: Convolvulaceae
- Genus: Convolvulus
- Species: C. oxyphyllus

Binomial name
- Convolvulus oxyphyllus Boiss.

Species of flowering plant

Convolvulus oxyphyllus is a species of flowering plant in the family Convolvulaceae, native to Iraq, Iran, Kuwait and Saudi Arabia. It was first described by Pierre Edmond Boissier in 1846.
