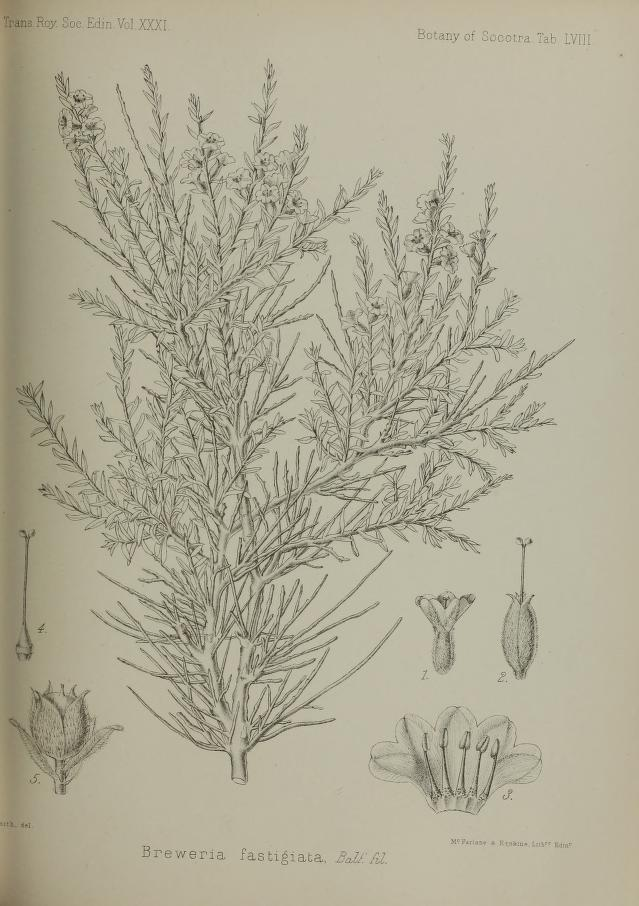
- An illustration of Breweria fastigiata (synonym of Convolvulus socotranus)

Conservation status
- Vulnerable (IUCN 3.1)

Scientific classification
- Kingdom: Plantae
- Clade: Tracheophytes
- Clade: Angiosperms
- Clade: Eudicots
- Clade: Asterids
- Order: Solanales
- Family: Convolvulaceae
- Genus: Convolvulus
- Species: C. socotranus

Binomial name
- Convolvulus socotranus Verdc.

Synonyms
- Seddera fastigiata (Balf.f.) Verdc.

= Convolvulus socotranus =

Species of bindweed

Convolvulus socotranus is a species of plant in the family Convolvulaceae. It is endemic to Socotra. Its natural habitat is subtropical or tropical dry shrubland.

Musty and brown in colouration, the plant is tough and hard-going, allowing it to flourish in dry shrublands.
