= Convolvulus nyctagineus =

Scientific classification
- Kingdom: Plantae
- Clade: Tracheophytes
- Clade: Angiosperms
- Clade: Eudicots
- Clade: Asterids
- Order: Solanales
- Family: Convolvulaceae
- Genus: Convolvulus
- Species: C. nyctagineus

Binomial name
- Convolvulus nyctagineus Greene

Synonyms
- Calystegia atriplicifolia Hallier f.; Convolvulus atriplicifolius (Hallier f.) House; Volvulus atriplicifolius (Hallier f.) Farw.

Species of flowering plant

Convolvulus nyctagineus is a species of plant native to the West Coast of the United States.
