= Convolvulus × lucanus =

Scientific classification
- Kingdom: Plantae
- Clade: Tracheophytes
- Clade: Angiosperms
- Clade: Eudicots
- Clade: Asterids
- Order: Solanales
- Family: Convolvulaceae
- Genus: Convolvulus
- Species: C. × lucanus

Binomial name
- Convolvulus × lucanus (Ten.) G. Don fil.

Synonyms
- Calystegia sepium var. tubata; Calystegia × lucana

Species of plant

Convolvulus × lucanus is a species of plant in the family Convolvulaceae. The current name of the species according to the Plants of the World Online database is Convolvulus × lucanus.

== Sources ==
This article incorporates text from a free content work. Licensed under CC0 (license statement/permission). Text taken from Calystegia lucana. Encyclopedia of Life.
