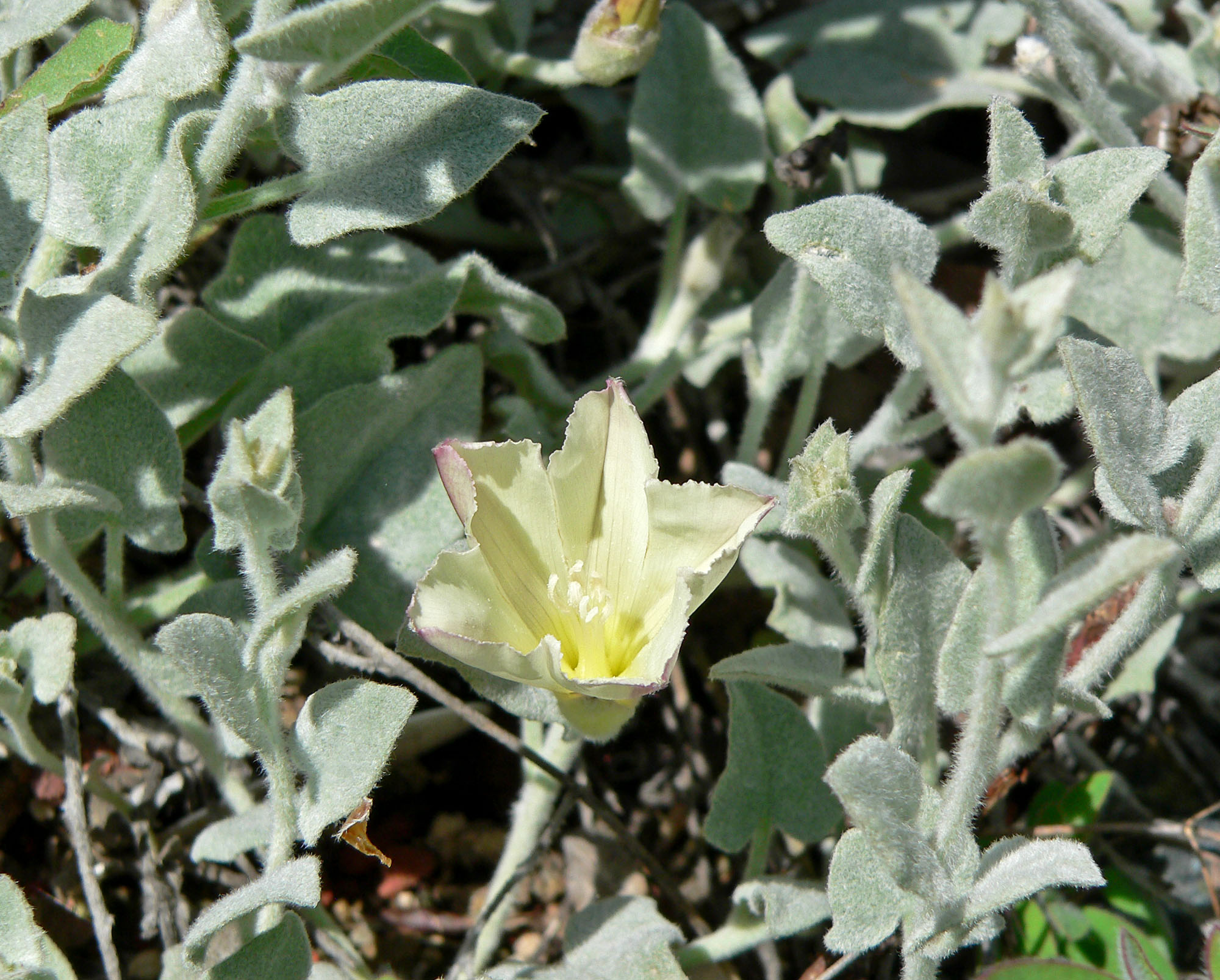
- ssp. pedicillata

Scientific classification
- Kingdom: Plantae
- Clade: Tracheophytes
- Clade: Angiosperms
- Clade: Eudicots
- Clade: Asterids
- Order: Solanales
- Family: Convolvulaceae
- Genus: Convolvulus
- Species: C. malacophyllus

Binomial name
- Convolvulus malacophyllus (Greene) Munz

Synonyms
- Convolvulus malacophylla

= Convolvulus malacophyllus =

Species of morning glory

Convolvulus malacophyllus is a species of morning glory known by the common name Sierra false bindweed. It is endemic to California, where it grows in several of the mountain ranges, including the Central Coast Ranges and the Sierra Nevada.

== Description ==
This is a rhizomatous perennial herb with a woolly stem growing to lengths of 10 centimeters to nearly a meter. It generally does not climb as do many other morning glories. The leaves are vaguely kidney-shaped to triangular and pointed, and reach a few centimeters in length. The foliage is covered in a short coat of woolly white hairs, giving the plant a light greenish gray color. The inflorescence holds a solitary white flower which is sometimes tinted with pink or yellow. The flower is 2 to 4 centimeters wide when open.
