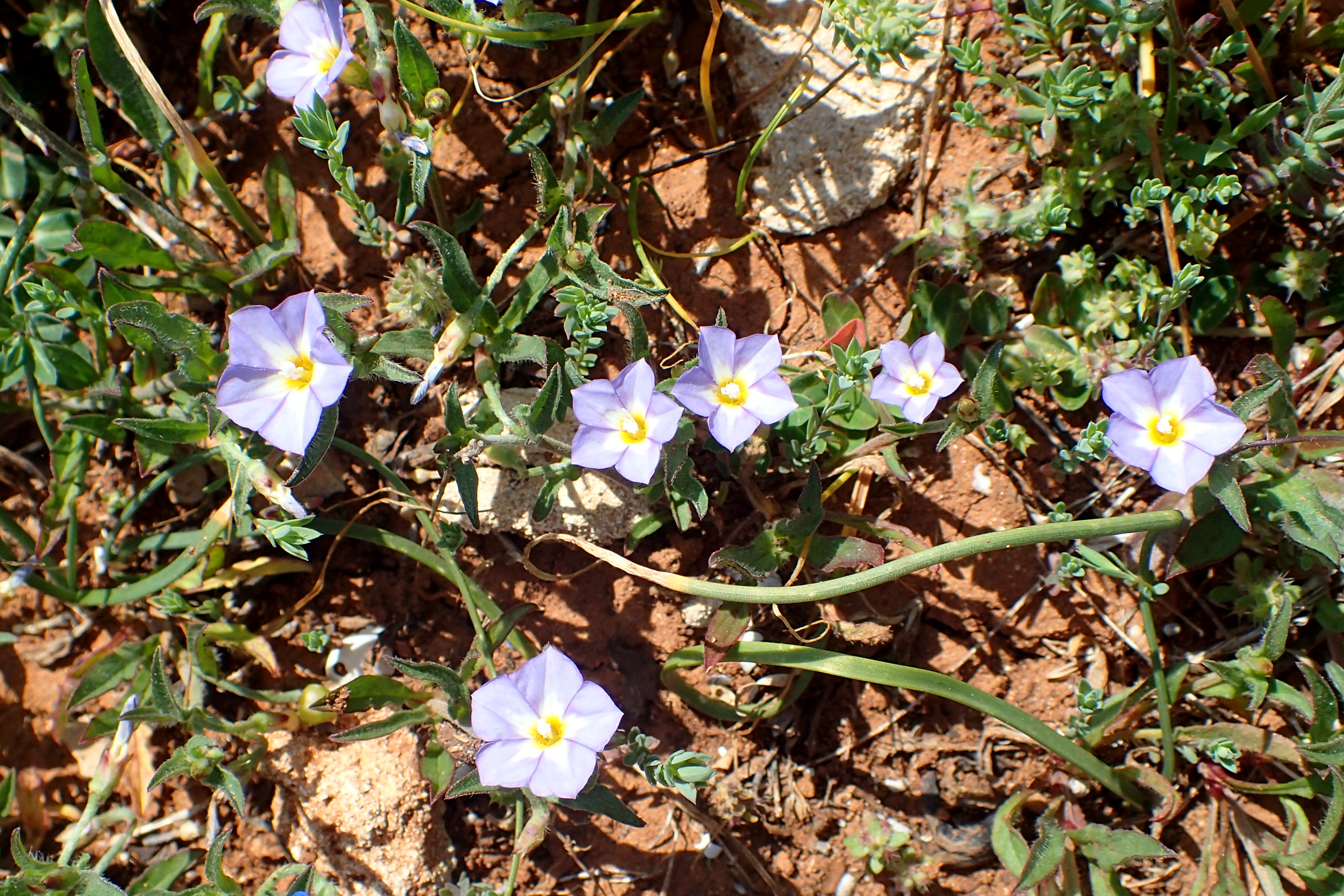

Scientific classification
- Kingdom: Plantae
- Clade: Tracheophytes
- Clade: Angiosperms
- Clade: Eudicots
- Clade: Asterids
- Order: Solanales
- Family: Convolvulaceae
- Genus: Convolvulus
- Species: C. pentapetaloides

Binomial name
- Convolvulus pentapetaloides L.

Synonyms
- Convolvulus arcuatus

= Convolvulus pentapetaloides =

Species of plant

Convolvulus pentapetaloides is a species of annual herb in the family Convolvulaceae. They have simple, broad leaves. Individuals can grow to 30 centimetres (12 in) tall.

== Sources ==
This article incorporates text from a free content work. Licensed under CC0 (license statement/permission). Text taken from Convolvulus pentapetaloides. Encyclopedia of Life.
