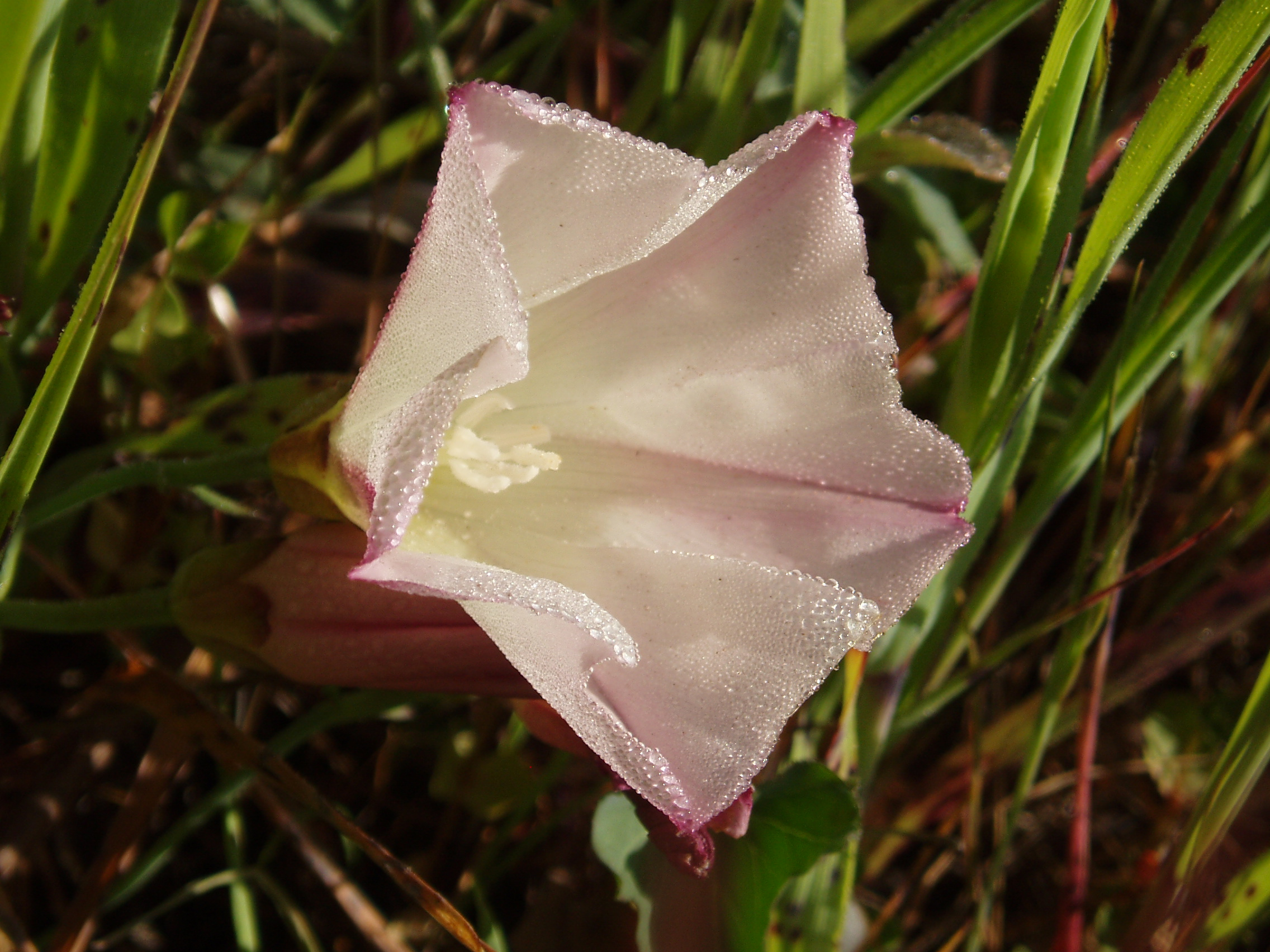

Scientific classification
- Kingdom: Plantae
- Clade: Tracheophytes
- Clade: Angiosperms
- Clade: Eudicots
- Clade: Asterids
- Order: Solanales
- Family: Convolvulaceae
- Genus: Convolvulus
- Species: C. purpuratus

Binomial name
- Convolvulus purpuratus (Greene)

Synonyms
- Calystegia purpurata (Greene) Brummitt; Convolvulus luteolus var. purpuratus Greene; Convolvulus occidentalis var. purpuratus (Greene) J.T.Howell

= Convolvulus purpuratus =

Species of flowering plant

Convolvulus purpuratus is a species of morning glory known by the common names smooth Western morning glory or Pacific false bindweed.

It is endemic to California, where it grows in the seaside scrub of the coastline and the chaparral of the coastal and inland valleys.

== Description ==
Convolvulus purpuratus is a robust perennial herb growing from a woody caudex and extending spreading or climbing stems up to 70 centimeters. The lobed leaves are up to 5 centimeters long and generally triangular in shape.

The inflorescence produces 1 to 5 flowers atop peduncles. The flower is a morning glory up to 5 centimeters wide, in color white, pink, purple, or white or cream with purple stripes.
