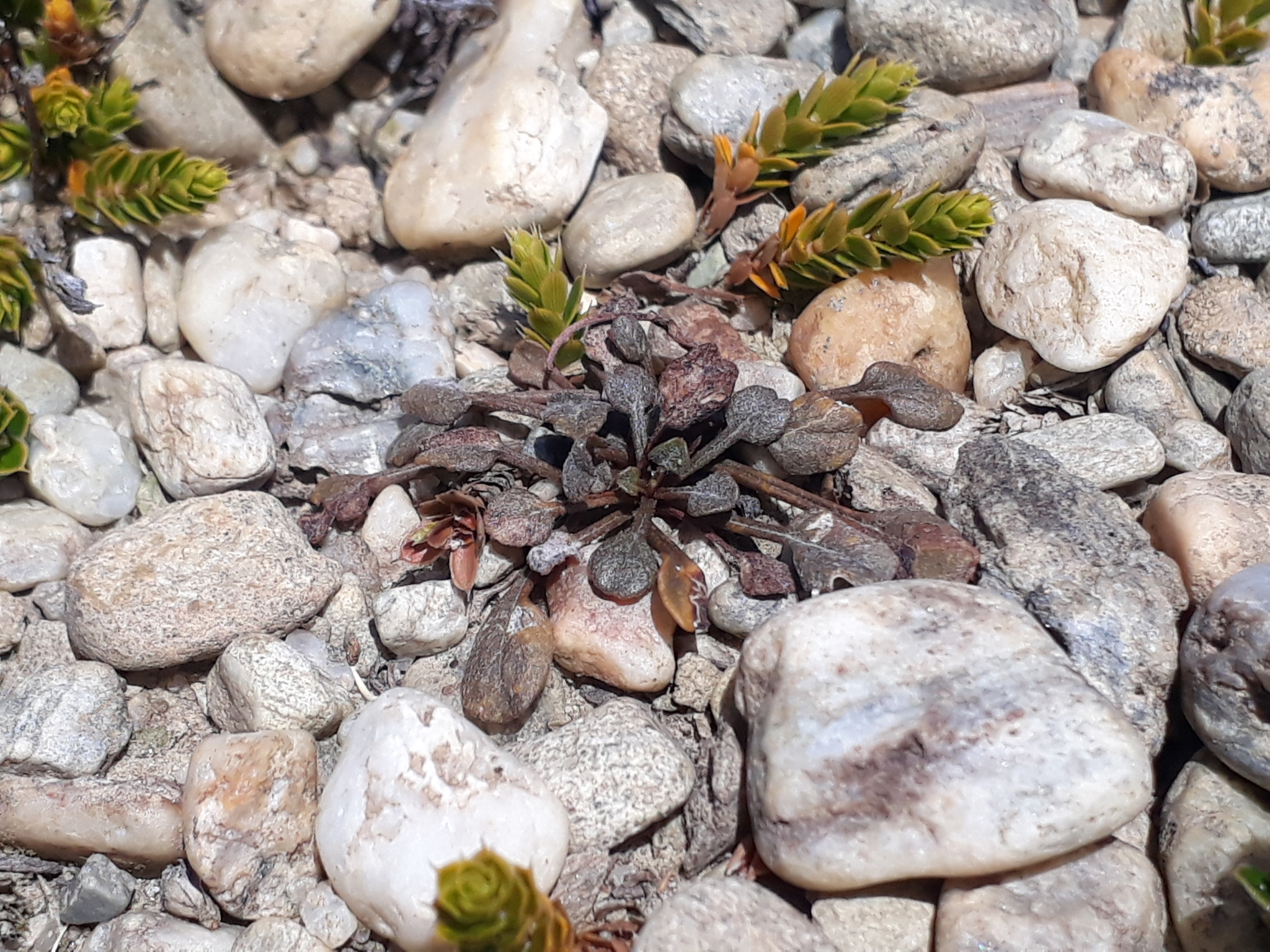
- Convolvulus verecundus in Central Otago

Scientific classification
- Kingdom: Plantae
- Clade: Tracheophytes
- Clade: Angiosperms
- Clade: Eudicots
- Clade: Asterids
- Order: Solanales
- Family: Convolvulaceae
- Genus: Convolvulus
- Species: C. verecundus

Binomial name
- Convolvulus verecundus Allan

= Convolvulus verecundus =

Species of flowering plant

Convolvulus verecundus, commonly known as trailing bindweed or tussock bindweed, is a species of flowering plant in the family Convolvulaceae. A perennial herb, it is endemic to New Zealand's South Island. It is primarily found in montane environments in tussock grasslands. It was first described by the botanist Harry Allan in his 1961 work Flora of New Zealand. A new form of the species, glaberrimus, was described in 2019. Its 2023 assessment in the New Zealand Threat Classification System was "At Risk – Declining".

== Description ==
Convolvulus verecundus is a perennial herb in the family Convolvulaceae. The stems can reach a length of up to 200 millimetres (8 inches). Leaves are found in a rosette arrangement. Leaves are arranged alternately on the stems and measure 6.5–12.0 × 4.0–12.5 mm long. They range from deltoid to broadly oblong in shape and are grey to silver-grey in colour. The pedicels are usually 5–30 mm long. The sepals are 3.9–4.1 × 3.5–3.8 mm long. The flowers are red, pink, or white. The fruits are found in seed capsules which are 5.8–6.2 × 4.5–7.5 mm long. The seeds are 8–3.9 × 2.4–3.0 mm long. C. verecundus has a diploid chromosome count of 22.

== Taxonomy ==
The genus Convolvulus was established by the European botanist Carl Linnaeus in 1753. C. verecundus was first described by the botanist Harry Allan in his 1961 work Flora of New Zealand. As of 2026, there are 228 species of the genus Convolvulus accepted by the Plants of the World Online taxonomic database. The genus has a worldwide distribution. A monograph of the genus was conducted in 2015. A new form of the species, glaberrimus, was described in 2019 by the botanists Peter Brian Heenan and Brian Molloy.

=== Etymology ===
The etymology (word origin) of C. verecundus's genus name, Convolvulus, comes from the Latin convolvere, meaning "to twine around". The species is commonly known as trailing bindweed or tussock bindweed.

== Distribution ==
Convolvulus verecundus is endemic to New Zealand's South Island. (Note: The botanist Harry Allan notes that the plant is found in the North Island in his 1961 work Flora of New Zealand. However, the Plants of the World Online taxonomic database states the plant's presence in the North Island is erroneous.) There is one record of the plant from the Waiau Toa / Clarence River. The plant is primarily found in the Mackenzie Basin, Central Otago, and the valley of the Waitaki River. C. verecundus's 2023 assessment in the New Zealand Threat Classification System was "Not Threatened".

=== Habitat ===
Convolvulus verecundus is primarily found in montane environments in tussock grasslands. Its altitudinal range is from approximately 200–1,000 m (660–3,280 ft) above sea level. It can also be found in rocky areas and areas where the vegetation mainly consists of introduced weeds.

== Ecology ==
The members of the Convolvulaceae are primarily pollinated by insects. The seeds of C. verecundus are dispersed by the wind.

== Works cited ==
Books

- Allan, H.H (1961). Flora of New Zealand. Vol. 1. P D Hasselberg Government Printer Publications. ISBN 9780477010566.

Journals

- Cronk, Q.C.B.; Clarke, G.C.S. (1981). "Convolvulaceae". Review of Palaeobotany and Palynology. 33 (1): 117–135. doi:10.1016/0034-6667(81)90086-5.
- Heenan, P. B.; Molloy, B. P. J.; De Lange, P. J. (2003). "Species of Convolvulus (Convolvulaceae) endemic to New Zealand". New Zealand Journal of Botany. 41 (3): 447–457. doi:10.1080/0028825X.2003.9512862. ISSN 0028-825X.
- Heenan, Peter Brian; Molloy, Brian P.J. (2019). "Five new and Nationally Threatened taxa of Brachyscome, Cardamine, Convolvulus, Geranium and Ranunculus obligate to vulnerable limestone habitats, eastern South Island, New Zealand". Phytotaxa. 415 (1). Magnolia Press. doi:10.11646/phytotaxa.415.1.2. ISSN 1179-3163.
- Wood, John; Williams, Bethany R.M.; Mitchell, Thomas C.; Carine, Mark; Harris, David; Scotland, Robert (2015). "A foundation monograph of Convolvulus L. (Convolvulaceae)". PhytoKeys. 51: 1–282. doi:10.3897/phytokeys.51.7104. ISSN 1314-2003.

Websites

- De Lange, Peter (2026). "Convolvulus verecundus f. verecundus". New Zealand Plant Conservation Network. Archived from the original on 11 August 2025.
- "Convolvulus verecundus Allan". Plants of the World Online. Archived from the original on 19 January 2025 – via Royal Botanic Gardens, Kew.
- "Convolvulus L." Plants of the World Online. Archived from the original on 8 June 2025 – via Royal Botanic Gardens, Kew.
