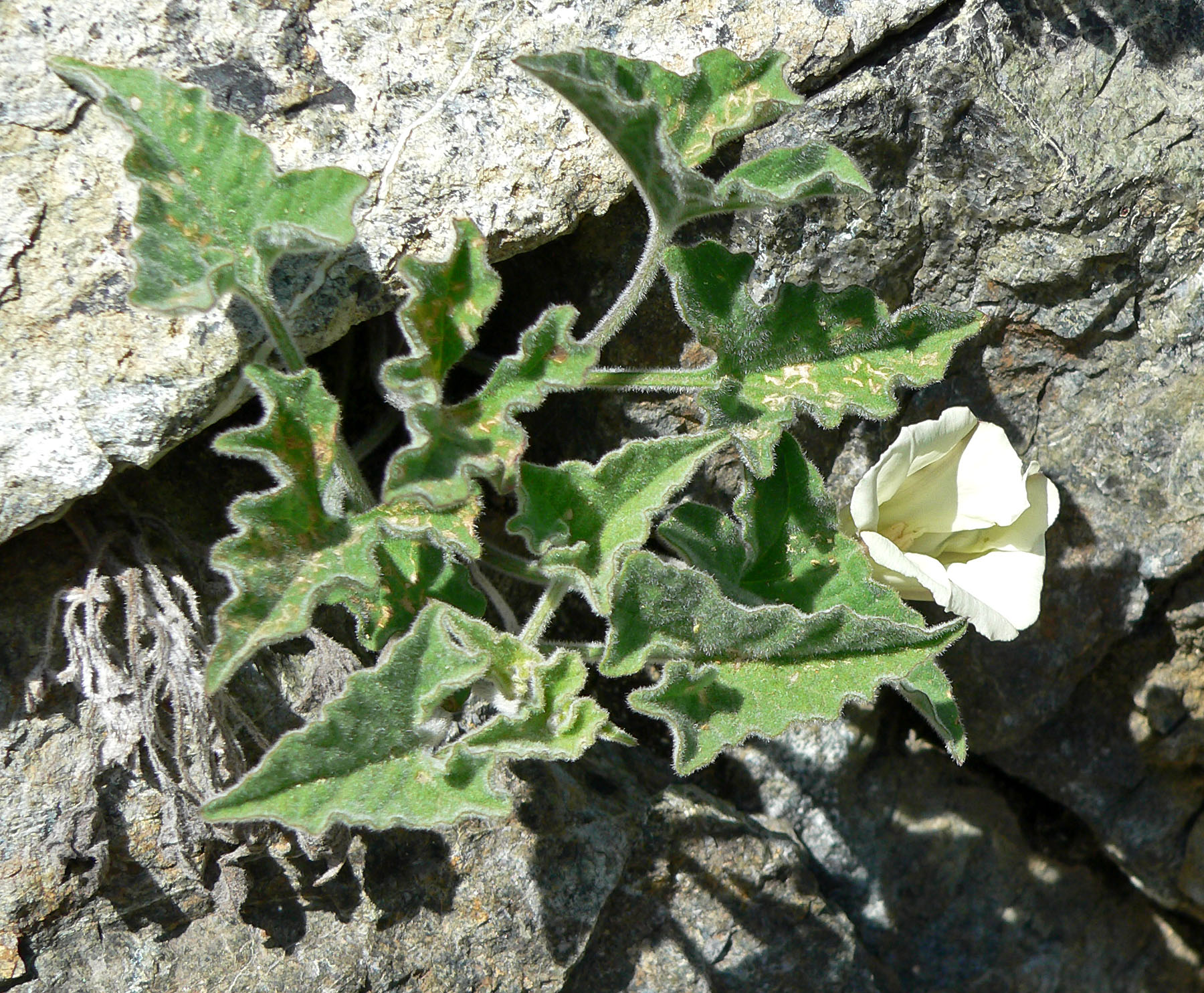
- Convolvulus collina at the University of California Botanical Garden, Berkeley.

Scientific classification
- Kingdom: Plantae
- Clade: Tracheophytes
- Clade: Angiosperms
- Clade: Eudicots
- Clade: Asterids
- Order: Solanales
- Family: Convolvulaceae
- Genus: Convolvulus
- Species: C. collinus

Binomial name
- Convolvulus collinus Greene

Synonyms
- Convolvulus collina (Greene) Brummitt; Convolvulus malacophyllus subsp. collinus (Greene) Abrams

= Convolvulus collinus =

Species of morning glory

Convolvulus collinus is a species of morning glory known by the common name Coast Range false bindweed. It is endemic to the Coast Ranges of northern and central California, where it grows on slopes and in woodlands, often on serpentine soils.

== Description ==
Convolvulus collinus is a rhizomatous perennial herb with densely hairy stems and foliage. The stem lies flat and generally does not climb as many other morning glories do. It reaches a maximum length of about 30 centimeters. The small leaves are kidney-shaped or deeply lobed and are wavy or crinkly along the edges.

The inflorescence holds a single white flower 2 to 5 centimeters wide when fully open.
