= Convolvulus fernandesii =

Conservation status
- Endangered (IUCN 3.1)

Scientific classification
- Kingdom: Plantae
- Clade: Tracheophytes
- Clade: Angiosperms
- Clade: Eudicots
- Clade: Asterids
- Order: Solanales
- Family: Convolvulaceae
- Genus: Convolvulus
- Species: C. fernandesii

Binomial name
- Convolvulus fernandesii P. Silva & Teles

Species of plant

Convolvulus fernandesii is a species of plant in the family Convolvulaceae. It is endemic to Portugal.
