= Convolvulus erinaceus =

Scientific classification
- Kingdom: Plantae
- Clade: Tracheophytes
- Clade: Angiosperms
- Clade: Eudicots
- Clade: Asterids
- Order: Solanales
- Family: Convolvulaceae
- Genus: Convolvulus
- Species: C. erinaceus

Binomial name
- Convolvulus erinaceus Ledeb.

Species of plant

Convolvulus erinaceus is a species of plant in the family Convolvulaceae. It is native to the Central Asia and the Near East.
