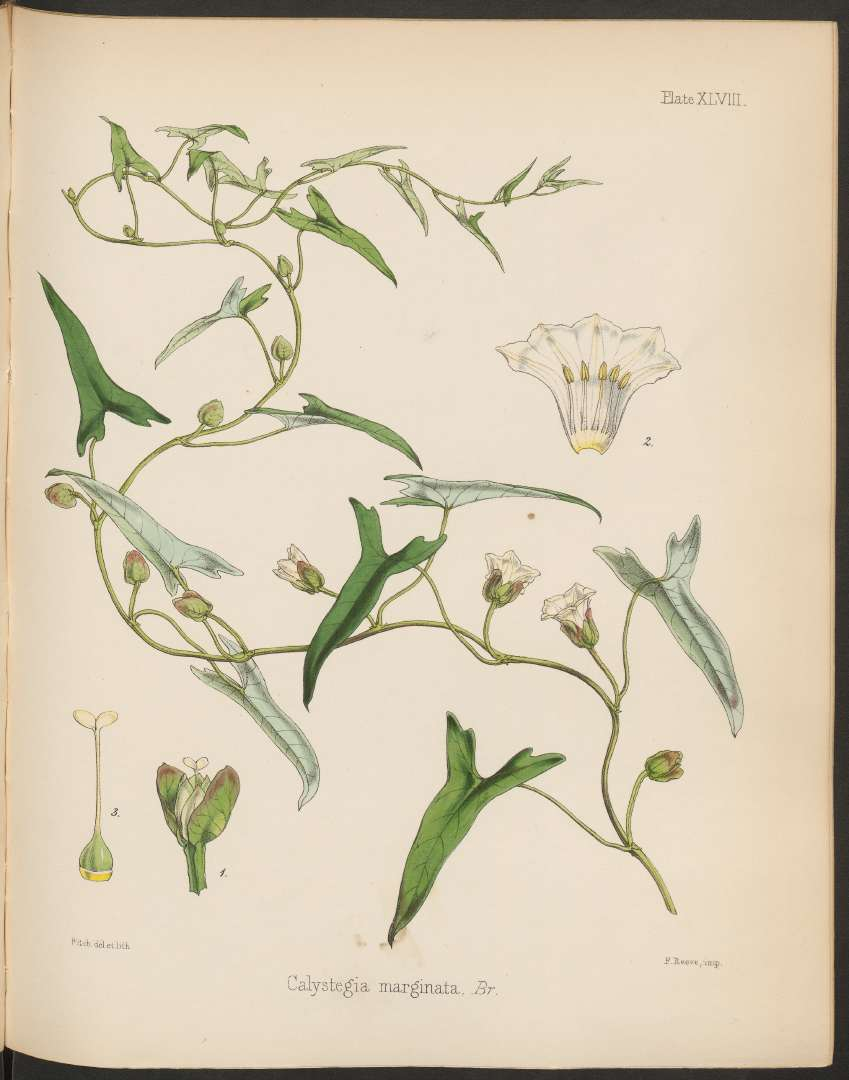

Scientific classification
- Kingdom: Plantae
- Clade: Tracheophytes
- Clade: Angiosperms
- Clade: Eudicots
- Clade: Asterids
- Order: Solanales
- Family: Convolvulaceae
- Genus: Convolvulus
- Species: C. naniflorus

Binomial name
- Convolvulus naniflorus R.Br.

Synonyms
- Calystegia marginata R.Br.; Convolvulus australianus S.C.Nepom. & Buril; Convolvulus marginatus (R.Br.) Spreng.; Volvulus marginatus (R.Br.) Kuntze

= Convolvulus naniflorus =

Species of morning glory

Convolvulus naniflorus is a species of morning glory, found in eastern Australia and New Zealand. A hairless and vigorous perennial climbing plant, with twining stems. The habitat is moist gullies in sclerophyll forest and on rainforest margins, widespread on the coast and ranges of eastern Australia. This is one of the many plants first published by Robert Brown with the type known as "(J.) v.v." appearing in his Prodromus Florae Novae Hollandiae et Insulae Van Diemen in 1810. The current accepted name of this species according to the Plants of the World Online database is Convolvulus naniflorus.
