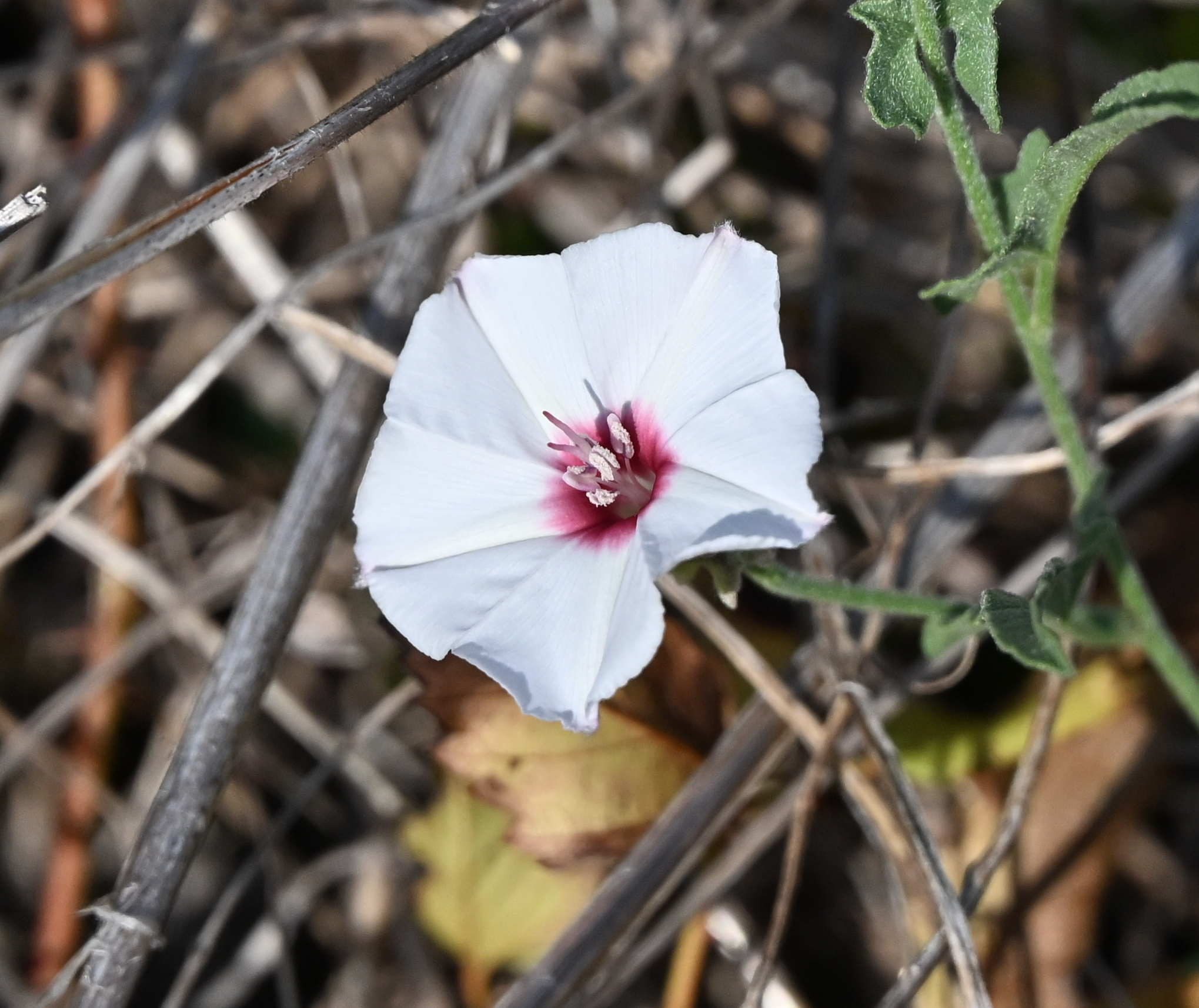

Conservation status
- Secure (NatureServe)

Scientific classification
- Kingdom: Plantae
- Clade: Tracheophytes
- Clade: Angiosperms
- Clade: Eudicots
- Clade: Asterids
- Order: Solanales
- Family: Convolvulaceae
- Genus: Convolvulus
- Species: C. equitans

Binomial name
- Convolvulus equitans Benth., 1839

= Convolvulus equitans =

Texas bindweed

Species of bindweed

Convolvulus equitans, commonly known as Texas bindweed, is a species of morning glory. It is native to the central and western United States and Mexico. Its overlapping petals give C. equitans its name; equitans being Latin for "riding on horseback".
