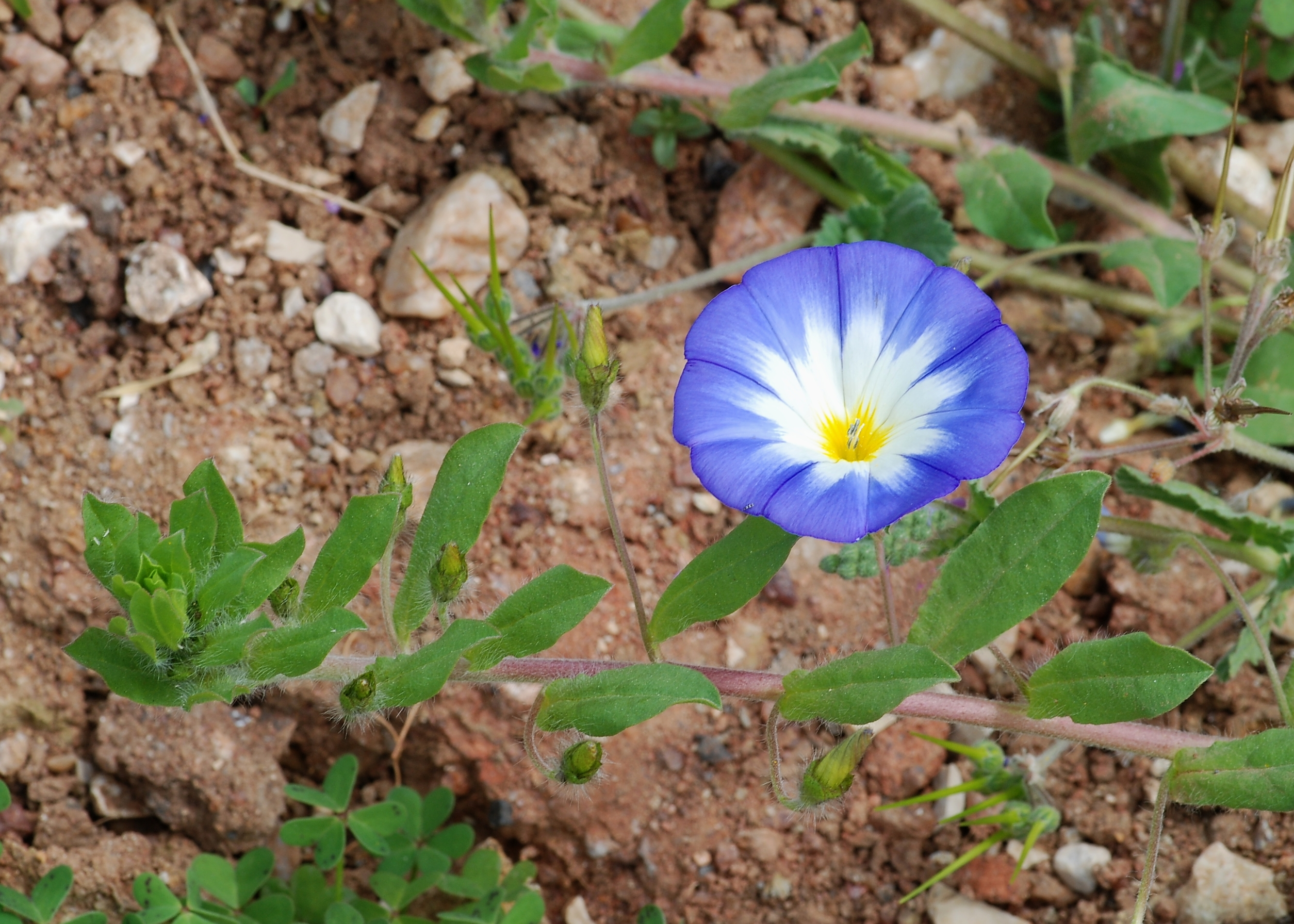

Scientific classification
- Kingdom: Plantae
- Clade: Tracheophytes
- Clade: Angiosperms
- Clade: Eudicots
- Clade: Asterids
- Order: Solanales
- Family: Convolvulaceae
- Genus: Convolvulus
- Species: C. tricolor

Binomial name
- Convolvulus tricolor L.

= Convolvulus tricolor =

Dwarf morning glory

Species of bindweed

Convolvulus tricolor (syn. C. minor) is a species of flowering plant in the family Convolvulaceae, native to Mediterranean Europe. Common names include dwarf morning-glory, tricolour convolvulus, and belle de jour.

== Description ==
It is a short to medium annual plant with solitary long-stalked flowers. The flower is a tri-coloured funnel-shaped bloom about three centimeters wide, blue with white and a yellow centre.

== Taxonomy ==
=== Synonyms ===
- Convolvulus maroccanus Batt.
- Convolvulus meonanthus Hoffmanns. & Link
- Convolvulus minor
- Convolvulus pseudotricolor Bertol.

=== Subspecies ===
- Convolvulus tricolor subsp. hortensis (Batt.) Maire
- Convolvulus tricolor subsp. meonanthus (Hoffmanns. & Link) Maire
- Convolvulus tricolor subsp. pentapetaloides (L.) O.Bolòs & Vigo
- Convolvulus tricolor subsp. tricolor L.

O. Bolòs et J. Vigoe distinguish Convolvulus tricolor ssp. pentapetaloides (L.) O.Bolòs & Vigo, found in the Balearic isles, from the type subspecies (Convolvulus tricolor ssp tricolor) by flowers that are smaller (7–10 mm), and both the calyx and the capsule having few or no hairs.

== Habitat ==
Common on cultivated land, dry open habitats, sandy places and roadsides.

== Distribution ==
This flowering plant is native to the Mediterranean Basin, particularly the south, but it is occasionally seen in other areas of similar climate. In Spain it can be found in the Balearic Islands, and Andalusia, especially in the Costa del Sol.

== Cultivation ==
Convolvulus tricolor is usually cultivated for ornamental purposes. The species and the cultivar 'Blue Ensign' have both received the Royal Horticultural Society's Award of Garden Merit.

== See also ==
- Morning glory (drug)
