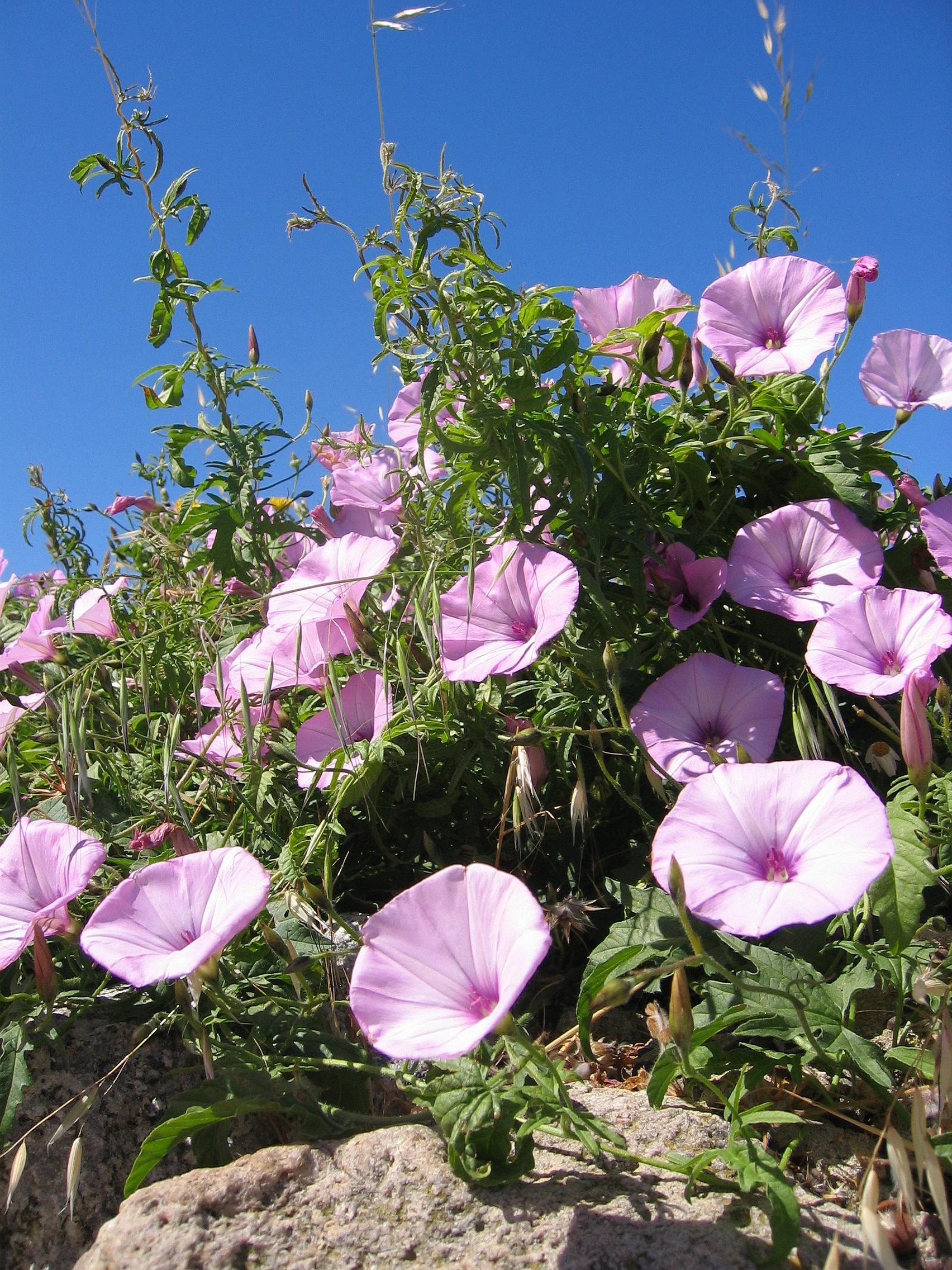

Scientific classification
- Kingdom: Plantae
- Clade: Tracheophytes
- Clade: Angiosperms
- Clade: Eudicots
- Clade: Asterids
- Order: Solanales
- Family: Convolvulaceae
- Genus: Convolvulus
- Species: C. althaeoides

Binomial name
- Convolvulus althaeoides L.

= Convolvulus althaeoides =

Mallow bindweed

Species of bindweed

Convolvulus althaeoides is a species of morning glory known by the common names mallow bindweed and mallow-leaved bindweed. This flowering plant is native to the Mediterranean Basin, but it is occasionally seen in other areas of similar climate, such as California in the United States, where it has been introduced. This is a climbing perennial plant with solitary flowers on long peduncles. The flower is a funnel-shaped pink bloom three or four centimeters wide. The leaves are deeply divided into narrow, fingerlike lobes.
