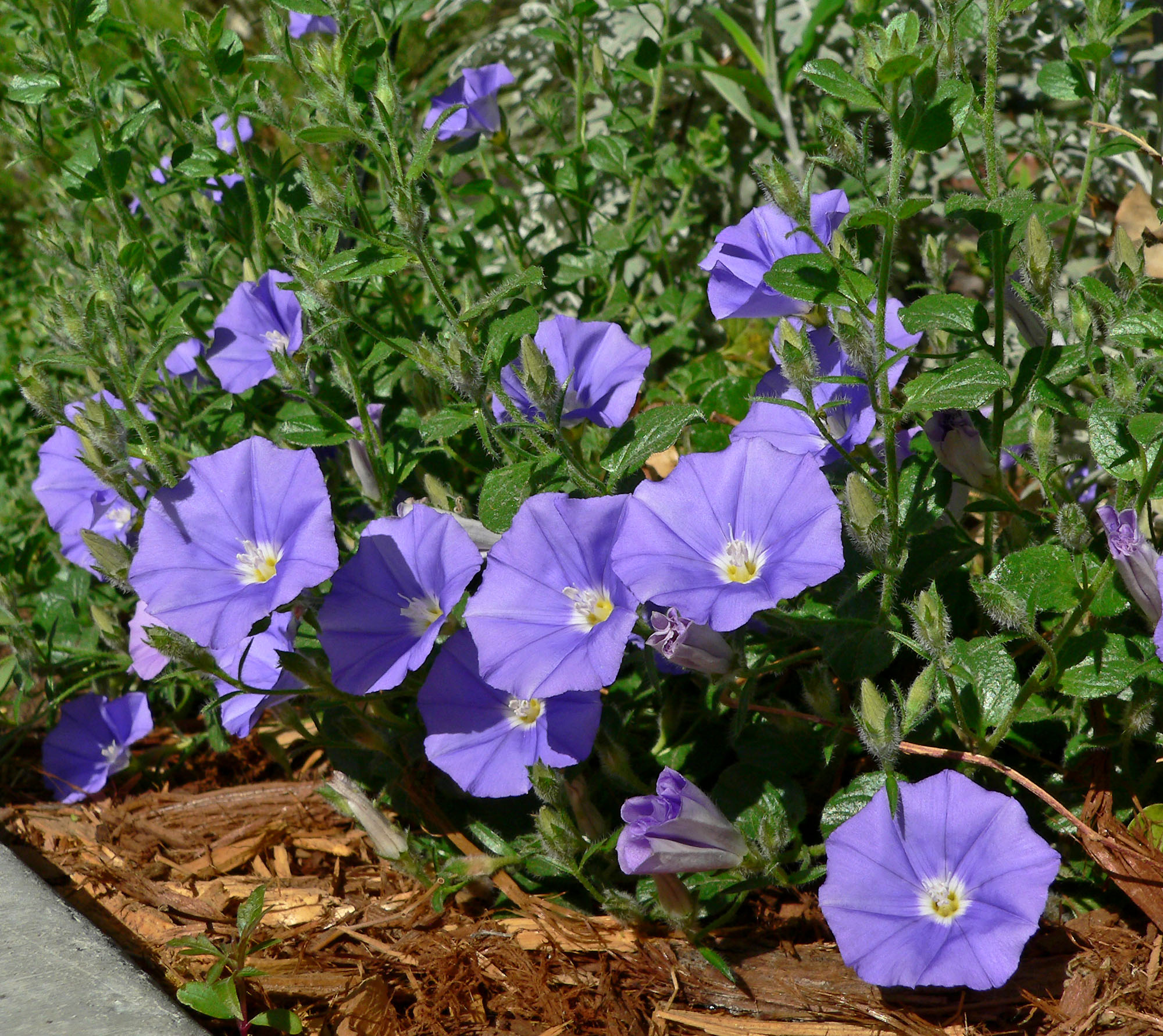

Scientific classification
- Kingdom: Plantae
- Clade: Tracheophytes
- Clade: Angiosperms
- Clade: Eudicots
- Clade: Asterids
- Order: Solanales
- Family: Convolvulaceae
- Genus: Convolvulus
- Species: C. sabatius

Binomial name
- Convolvulus sabatius Viv.

Synonyms
- Convolvulus mauritanicus Boiss.

= Convolvulus sabatius =

Species of bindweed

Convolvulus sabatius, the ground blue-convolvulus or blue rock bindweed, is a species of flowering plant in the family Convolvulaceae, native to Italy and North Africa, and often seen in cultivation.

== Description ==
It is a woody-stemmed trailing perennial plant, growing to 20 cm (8 in) in height. It has slightly hairy leaves and light blue to violet flowers, often with a lighter centre, which is 2.5–5 cm (1–2 in) in diameter. The stem is decumbent to ascending and non-twining. The leaves are all entire. The base of the leaf blade is slightly heart-shaped and truncate to wedge-shaped. The corolla is 15 to 22 millimeters long and blue to pink.

The Latin specific epithet sabatius refers to the Savona region of Italy.

== Cultivation ==
This species is often sold under the synonym C. mauritanicus. Although a perennial, it is best treated as an annual in colder climates. It is suited to window boxes and containers and prefers a sunny situation with good drainage. Tip pruning encourages new growth and flowering. It has gained the Royal Horticultural Society's Award of Garden Merit.
