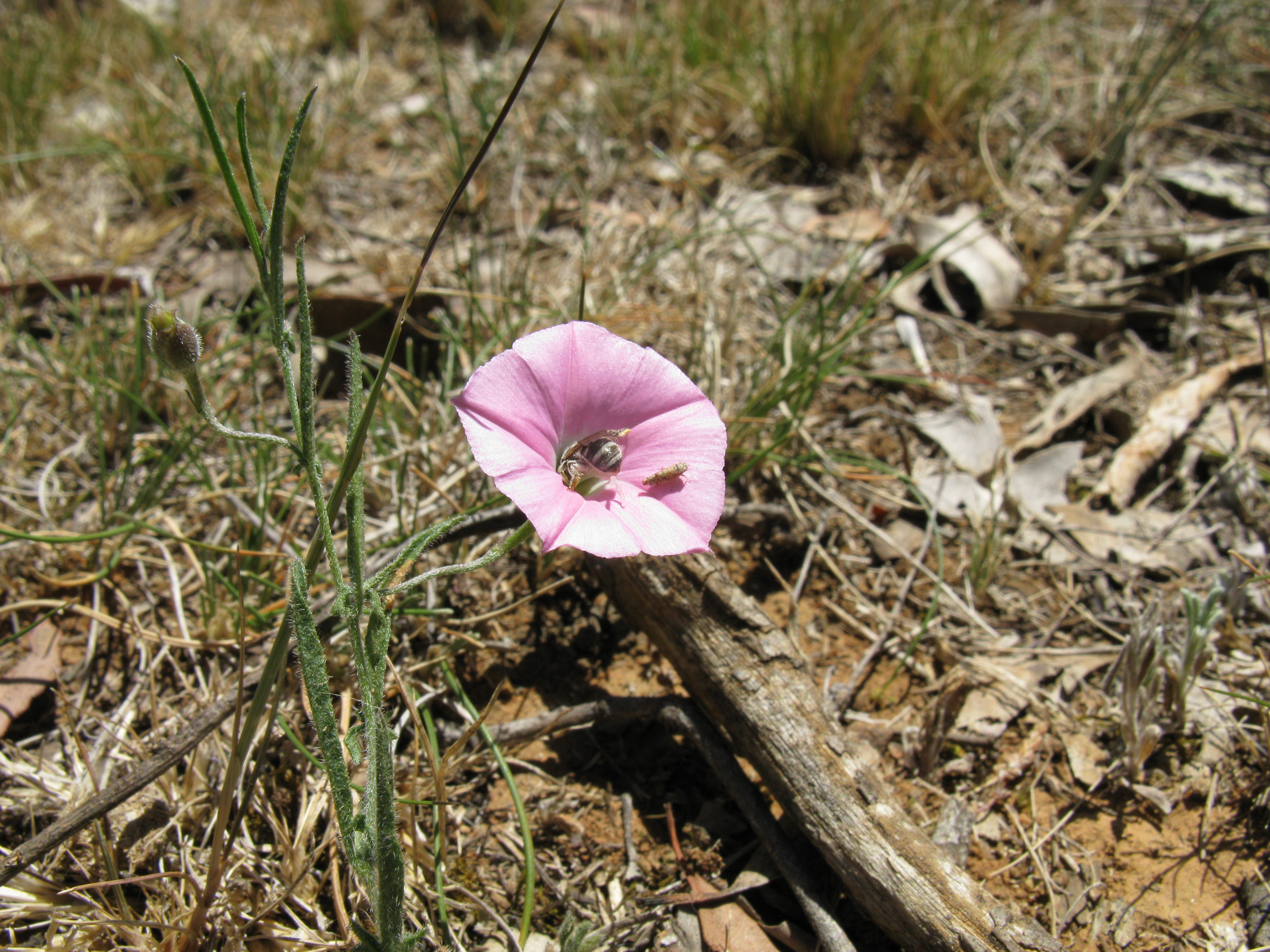

Scientific classification
- Kingdom: Plantae
- Clade: Tracheophytes
- Clade: Angiosperms
- Clade: Eudicots
- Clade: Asterids
- Order: Solanales
- Family: Convolvulaceae
- Genus: Convolvulus
- Species: C. angustissimus

Binomial name
- Convolvulus angustissimus R.Br.

= Convolvulus angustissimus =

Australian bindweed

Species of bindweed

Convolvulus angustissimus commonly known as Australian bindweed, is a flowering plant in the family Convolvulaceae. It is a twining perennial with pink or white flowers and grows in Tasmania and mainland states of Australia.

== Description ==
Convolvulus angustissimus has slender, twisted, trailing branches with terete stems, hairy when young and grows to a height of 0.02 to 0.6 metres (0.07 to 1.97 ft). The leaf shape varies and grow along the length of the stems, basal leaves oblong to oval-shaped, margins toothed or slightly lobed and heart-shaped or squared. Upper leaves egg-shaped to triangular egg-shaped, 1–6.5 cm (0.39–2.56 in) long, 2–4 cm (0.79–1.57 in) wide, mostly acute at the apex and petiole 2–20 mm (0.079–0.787 in) long. Flowers usually borne singly in leaf axils, corolla pink or rarely white, 7–20 mm (0.28–0.79 in) long, 7–20 mm (0.28–0.79 in) in diameter, peduncle terete, 4–50 mm (0.16–1.97 in) long, flattened hairs. Flowering occurs between January and December and the fruit is globose shaped, 4–8 mm (0.16–0.31 in) long, 4–7 mm (0.16–0.28 in) in diameter and smooth.

== Taxonomy and naming ==
Convolvulus angustissimus was first formally described by Robert Brown in 1810 and the description was published in Prodromus Florae Novae Hollandiae. The specific epithet (angustissimus) means "very narrow" reference to the shape of the leaves.

== Distribution and habitat ==
Australian bindweed grows mostly on loamy or clay soils in woodlands or forests in all mainland states of Australia with the exception of the Northern Territory.
