= Bucculatrix cantabricella =

Scientific classification
- Kingdom: Animalia
- Phylum: Arthropoda
- Clade: Pancrustacea
- Class: Insecta
- Order: Lepidoptera
- Family: Bucculatricidae
- Genus: Bucculatrix
- Species: B. cantabricella

Binomial name
- Bucculatrix cantabricella Chrétien, 1898

Species of moth

Bucculatrix cantabricella is a moth in the family Bucculatricidae. It was described by Pierre Chrétien in 1898. It is found in the western and central Mediterranean region, east to Slovakia and North Macedonia.

The wingspan is 7–8 mm.

The larvae feed on Convolvulus cantabrica. They mine the leaves of their host plant. Larvae can be found in June. The species probably overwinters in the pupal stage.
