= Review of Palaeobotany and Palynology =

- Discipline: Palaeobotany, palynology
- Language: English
- Edited by: H. Kerp, M. Stephenson

Publication details
- History: 1967–present
- Publisher: Elsevier
- Frequency: Monthly
- Open access: Author fee
- Impact factor: 1.904 (2014)

Standard abbreviations
- ISO 4: Rev. Palaeobot. Palynol.

Indexing
- CODEN: RPPYAX
- ISSN: 0034-6667
- LCCN: 77010401
- OCLC no.: 644510722

Links
- Journal homepage; Online access

Review of Palaeobotany and Palynology is a peer-reviewed scientific journal of palaeobotany and palynology established in 1967. It is published by Elsevier on a monthly basis. The journal is edited by H. Kerp (Westfälische Wilhelms-Universität Münster) and M. Stephenson (British Geological Survey).

== Abstracting and indexing ==
The journal is abstracted and indexed in the following databases:

- Academic Search
- AGRICOLA
- Biological Abstracts
- BIOSIS Previews
- CAB Abstracts
- Current Contents/Agriculture, Biology & Environmental Sciences
- Elsevier Biobase
- Environmental Sciences & Pollution Management
- GEOBASE
- GeoRef
- PASCAL
- Petroleum Abstracts
- PubMed
- Science Citation Index
- Scopus
- Zoological Record

According to the Journal Citation Reports, the journal has a 2014 impact factor of 1.904.
