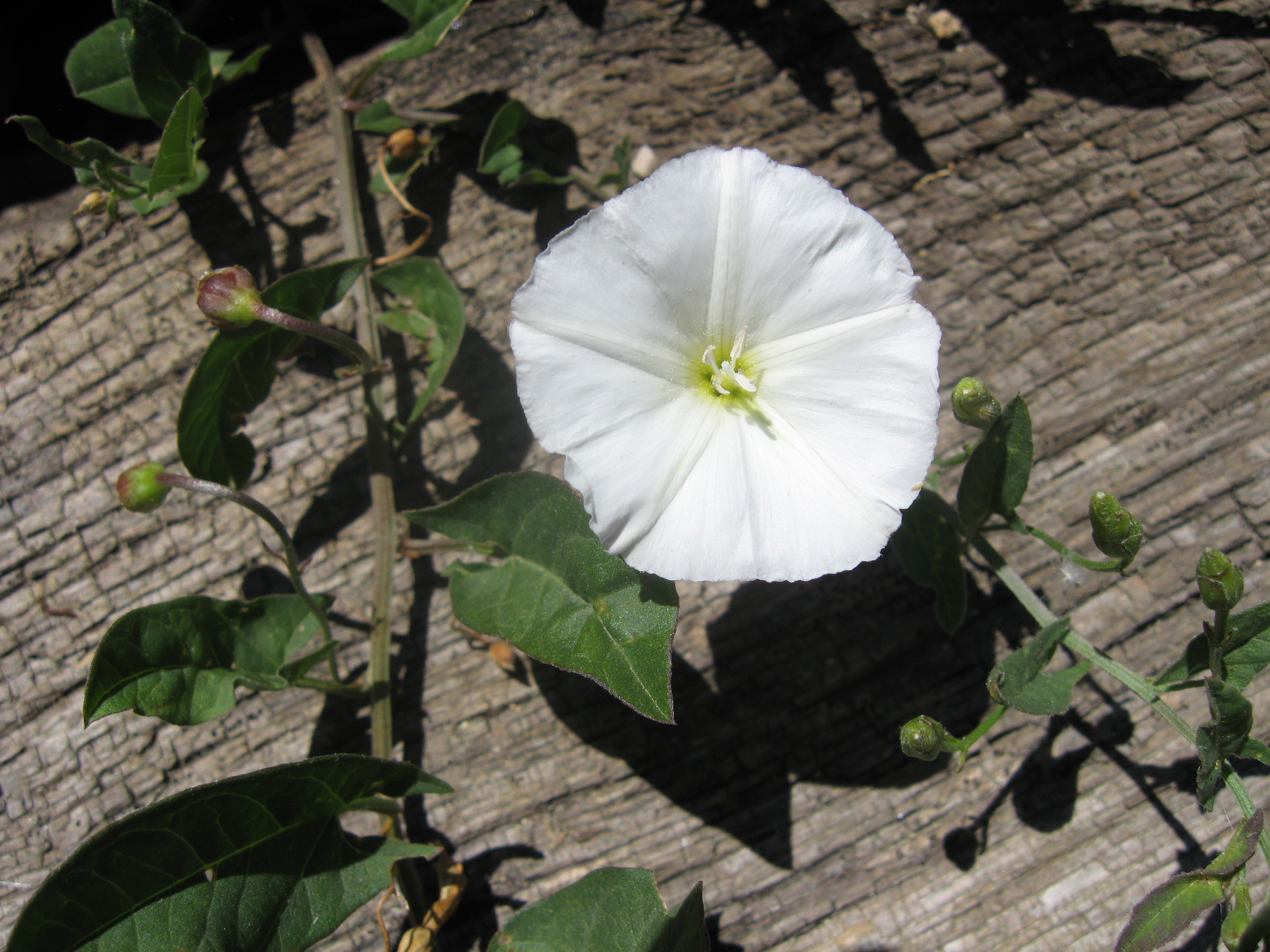
- Convolvulus arvensis

Scientific classification
- Kingdom: Plantae
- Clade: Tracheophytes
- Clade: Angiosperms
- Clade: Eudicots
- Clade: Asterids
- Order: Solanales
- Family: Convolvulaceae
- Tribe: Convolvuleae
- Genus: Convolvulus; L.

Type species
- Convolvulus arvensis L.

Species
- List of Convolvulus species

= Convolvulus =

Genus of flowering plants

Convolvulus is a genus of about 200 to 250 species of flowering plants in the bindweed family Convolvulaceae, with a cosmopolitan distribution; the Plants of the World Online database currently accepts 228 species and 12 natural hybrids. Common names include bindweed and morning glory; both are names shared with other closely related genera. The genus Calystegia has been shown to be genetically embedded within Convolvulus, and is now treated as a synonym of it by the Plants of the World Online database.

== Taxonomy ==
The genus Calystegia, until recently widely accepted, has been shown to be genetically embedded within Convolvulus, and is now treated as a synonym of it by the Plants of the World Online database.

== Description ==
They are annual or perennial herbaceous vines; a few species are woody shrubs. They grow to heights of 0.3–4 m scrambling through ground vegetation, shrubs and trees; the shrubby species (e.g. C. cneorum) growing to 0.5 m tall with a woody base. The leaves are spirally arranged, and the flowers trumpet-shaped, mostly white or pink, but blue, violet, purple, or yellow in some species.

== Ecology ==
Many of the species are invasive weeds; but others are cultivated for their attractive flowers, while some are globally threatened.

Convolvulus species are used as food plants by the larvae of some Lepidoptera species, including the convolvulus hawk moth, the sweet potato leaf miner (Bedellia somnulentella) and the gem; the leaf miner Bucculatrix cantabricella feeds exclusively on C. cantabricus.

== Gallery ==
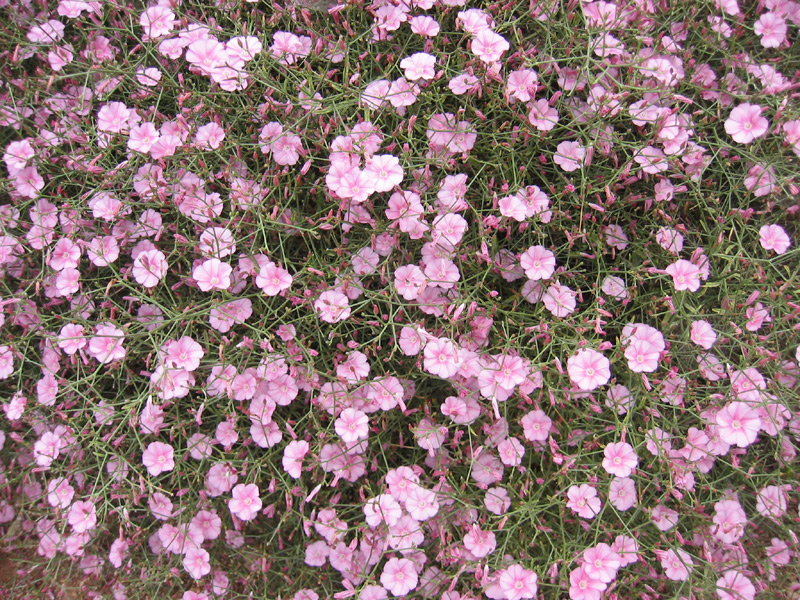
Convolvulus dorycnium

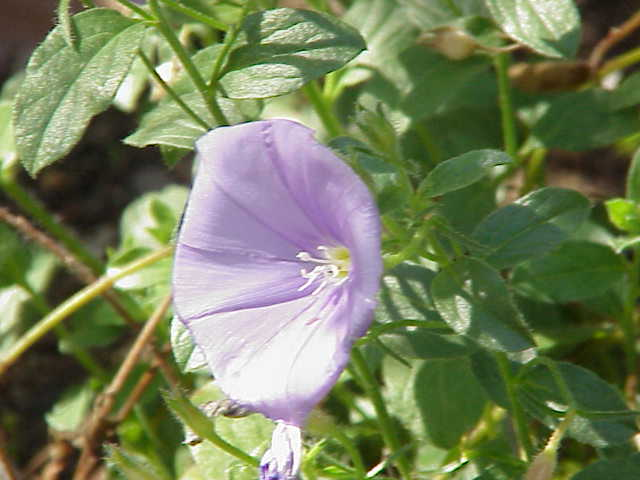
Convolvulus sabatius

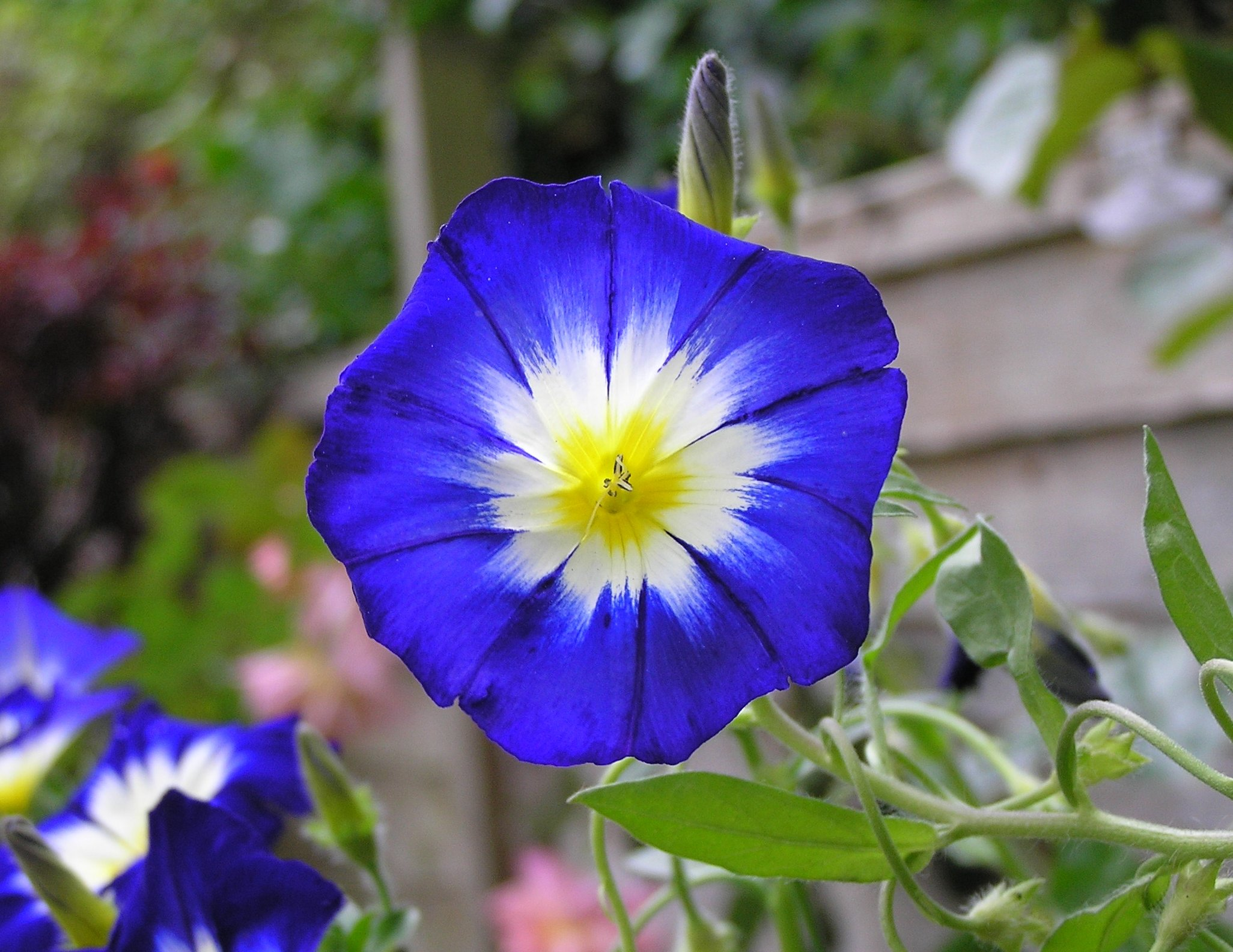
Cultivated Convolvulus tricolor

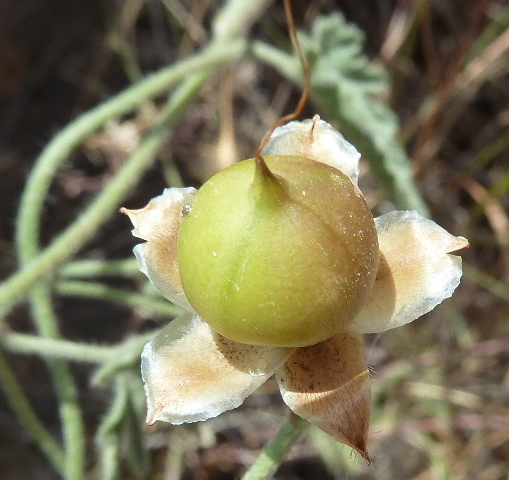
Convolvulus althaeoides

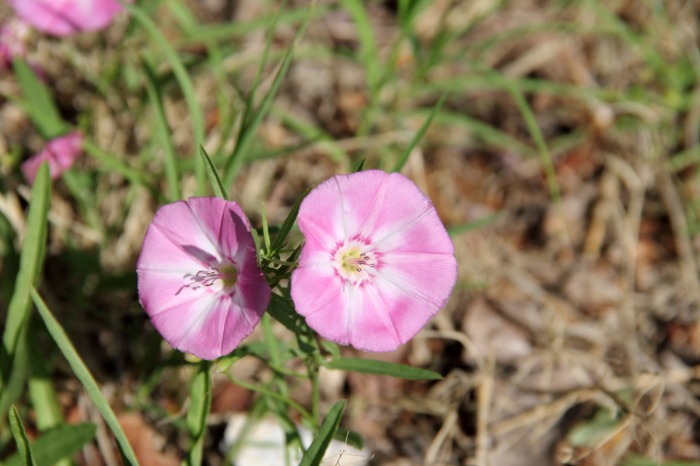
Convolvulus arvensis

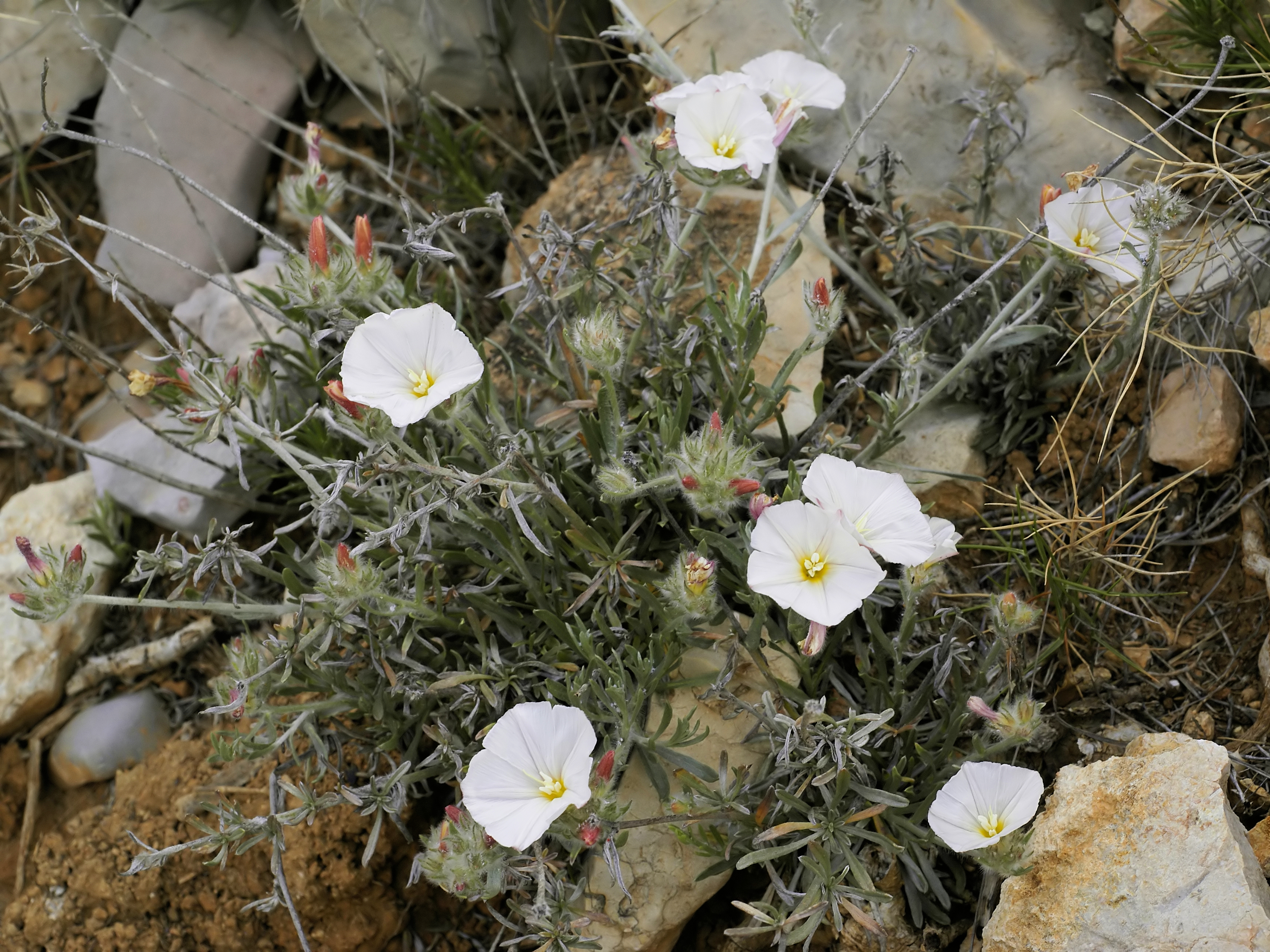
Convolvulus cneorum in Catalonia, Spain

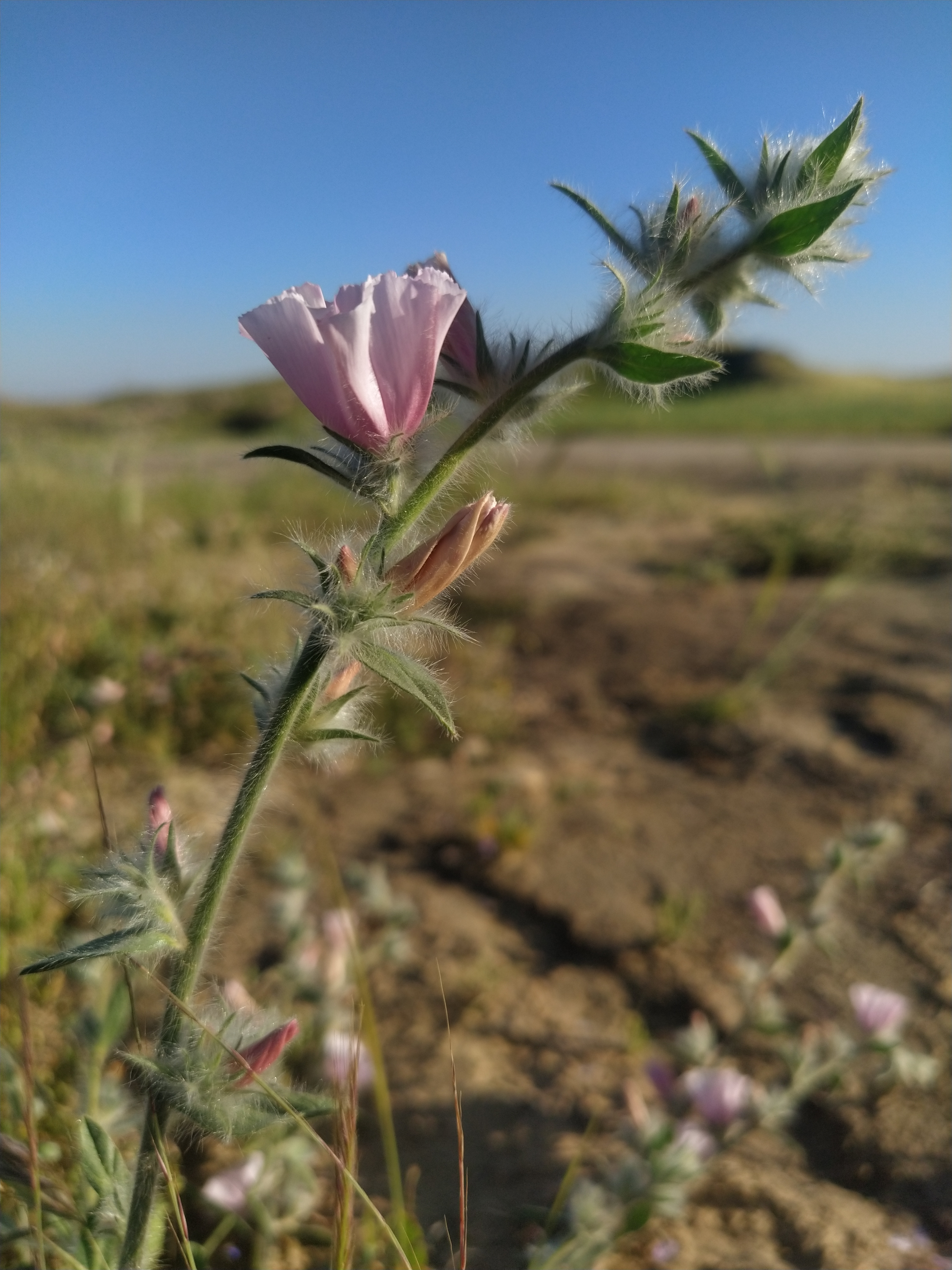
Convolvulus cephalopodus in Behbahan

Seed under a microscope
