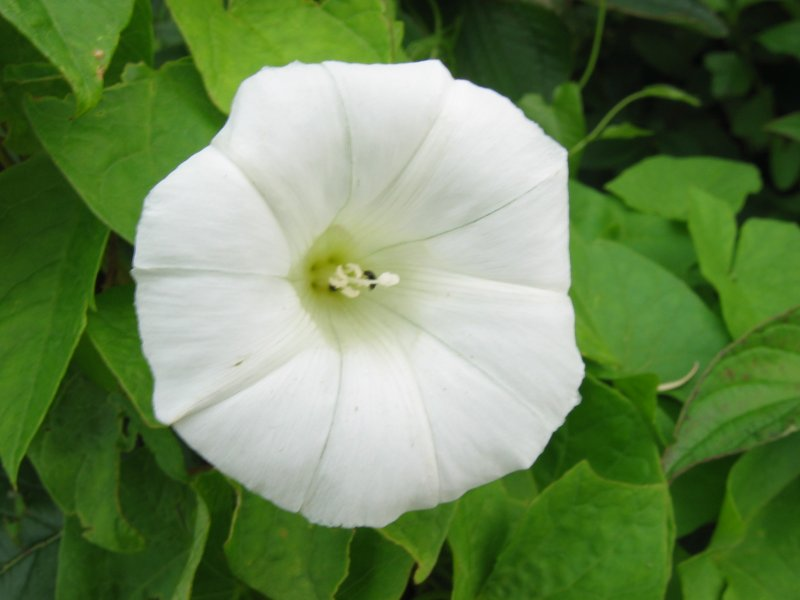
- Calystegia sepium
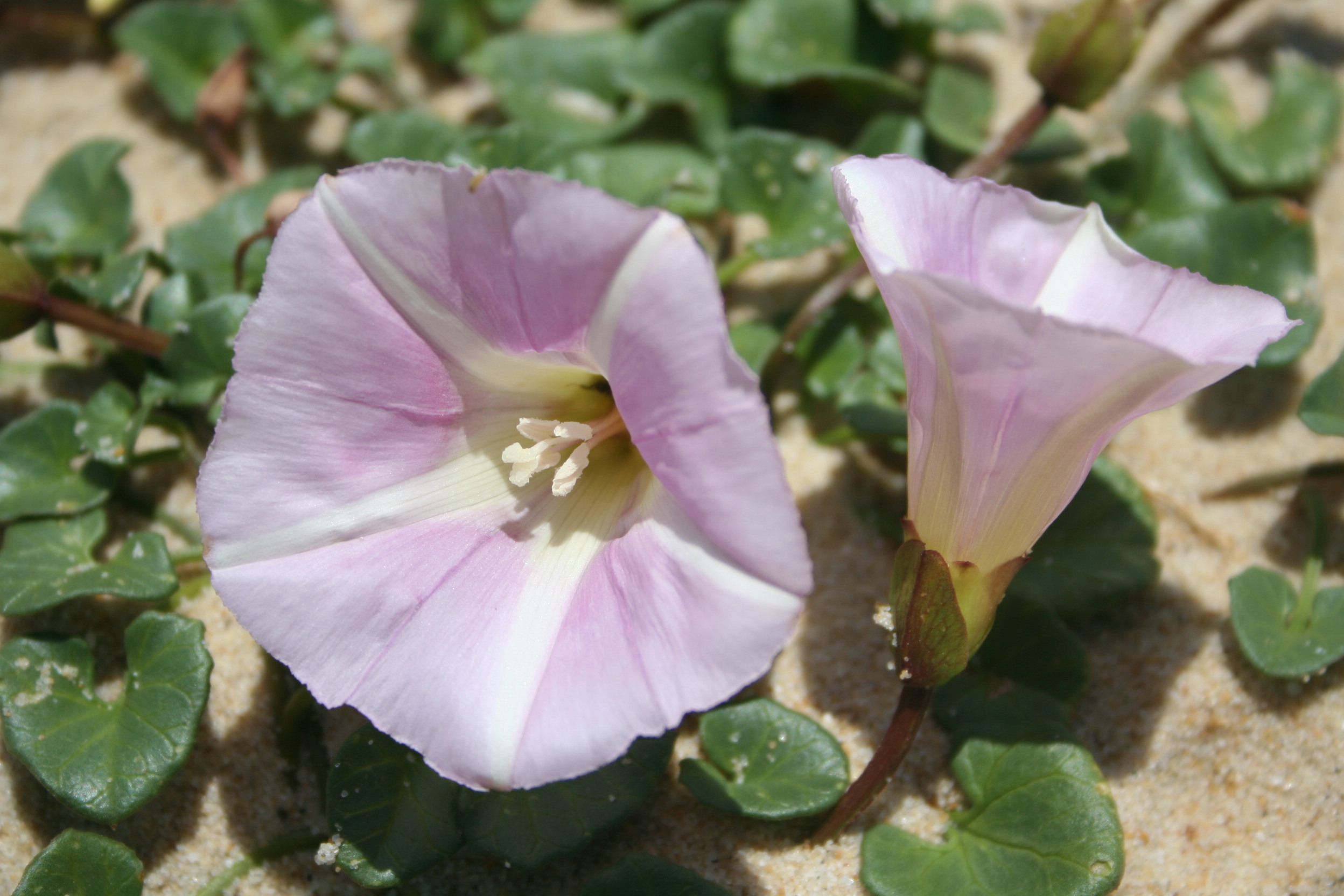
- Calystegia soldanella

Scientific classification
- Kingdom: Plantae
- Clade: Tracheophytes
- Clade: Angiosperms
- Clade: Eudicots
- Clade: Asterids
- Order: Solanales
- Family: Convolvulaceae
- Tribe: Convolvuleae
- Genus: Calystegia; R.Br.

Species
- See text

= Calystegia =

Genus of flowering plants in the morning glory family

Calystegia (bindweed, false bindweed, or morning glory) is a formerly accepted genus of flowering plants in the family Convolvulaceae. In 2025, a taxonomic study proposed merging the genus into the closely related Convolvulus, a treatment also followed by the Plants of the World Online (POWO) taxonomic database, which recognises Calystegia as a synonym of Convolvulus. The genus has a cosmopolitan distribution in temperate and subtropical regions, but with half of the species endemic to California.

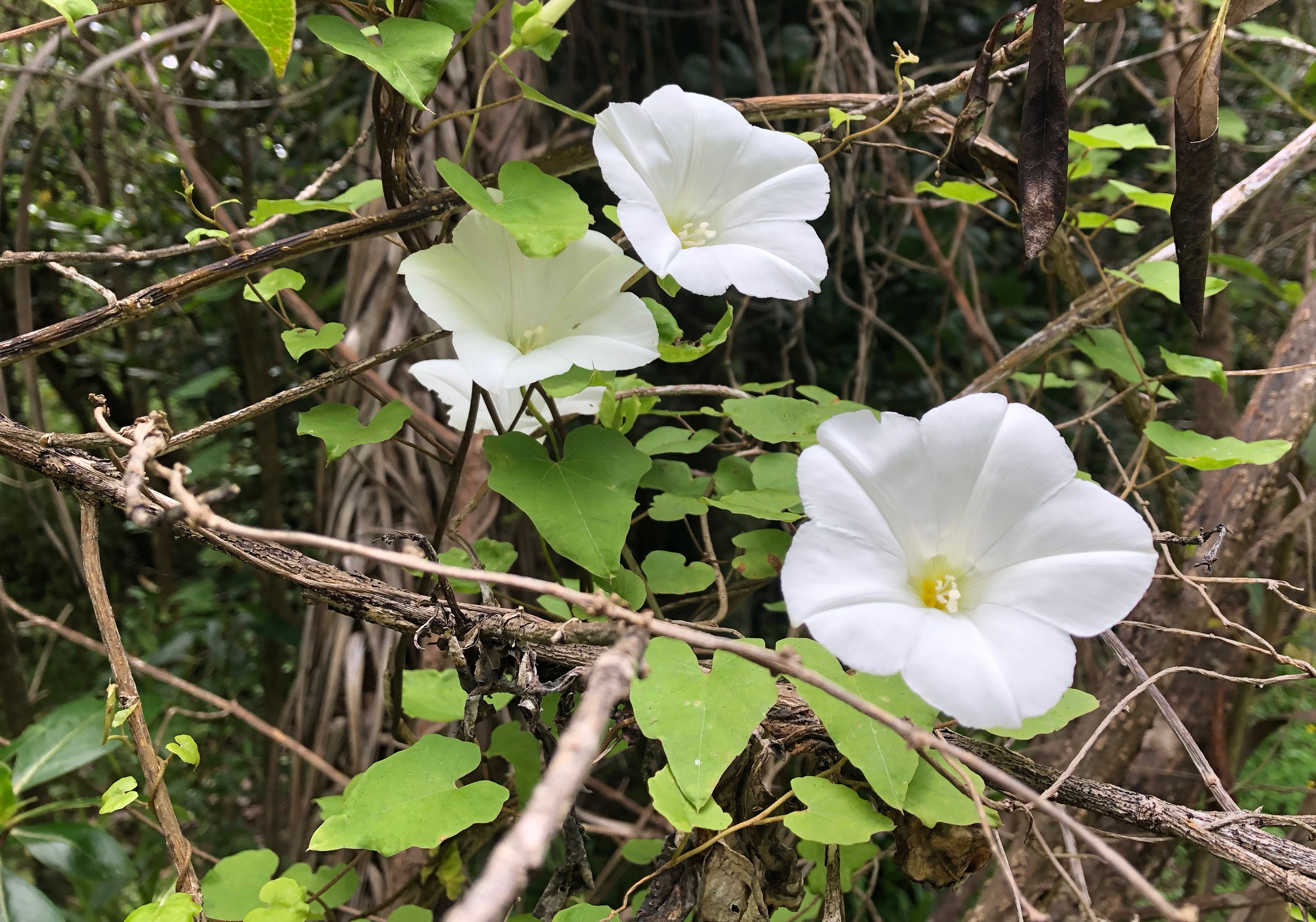
Flowering Calystegia tuguriorum

== Description ==
They are annual or herbaceous perennial twining vines growing 1–5 m tall, with spirally arranged leaves. The flowers are trumpet-shaped, 3–10 cm diameter, white or pink, with (in most species) a sometimes inflated basal epicalyx.

The genus bears much similarity to a related genus Convolvulus, and is sometimes combined with it; it is distinguished primarily by the pollen being smooth, and in the ovary being unilocular.

== Taxonomy ==
It was described by Robert Brown in 1810.

=== Etymology ===
The name is derived from two Greek words κάλυξ (kálux) "cup", and στέγη (stégē) "a covering", meaning "covering cup", this refers to the large bracts that cover the sepals.

=== Species ===
The following species were recognised in 2024 by the Plants of the World taxonomic database in the genus Calystegia:

- Calystegia affinis
- Calystegia atriplicifolia – nightblooming false bindweed
- Calystegia binghamiae
- Calystegia brummittii
- Calystegia catesbiana – Catesby's false bindweed
- Calystegia collina – Coast Range false bindweed
- Calystegia felix
- Calystegia hederacea – Japanese false bindweed
- Calystegia × howittiorum
- Calystegia × krauseana
- Calystegia longipes – Paiute false bindweed, plateau morning glory
- Calystegia × lucana
- Calystegia macaunii – Macoun's false bindweed
- Calystegia macrostegia – island false bindweed
- Calystegia malacophylla – sierra false bindweed
- Calystegia marginata – small-flowered white bindweed New Zealand
- Calystegia × melnikovae
- Calystegia occidentalis – chaparral false bindweed
- Calystegia peirsonii – Peirson's false bindweed
- Calystegia pellita – hairy false bindweed
- Calystegia pubescens
- Calystegia × pulchra – hairy bindweed
- Calystegia purpurata – Pacific false bindweed
- Calystegia × scania
- Calystegia sepium – large bindweed, hedge bindweed, bearbind, hedgebell (type species)
- Calystegia silvatica – great bindweed, shortstalk bindweed
- Calystegia soldanella – sea bindweed, seashore false bindweed, beach morning glory
- Calystegia spithamaea – low false bindweed, upright bindweed
- Calystegia stebbinsii – Stebbins' false bindweed, Stebbins' morning glory
- Calystegia subacaulis – hillside false bindweed
- Calystegia tuguriorum – New Zealand bindweed, pōuwhiwhi, pōwhiwhi, rarotawake
- Calystegia vanzuukiae

== Ecology ==
Some of the species, notably Calystegia sepium and C. silvatica, are problematic weeds, which can swamp other more valuable plants by climbing over them, but some are also deliberately grown for their attractive flowers.

Calystegia species are eaten by the larvae of some Lepidoptera species including Bedellia somnulentella (recorded on C. sepium) and small angle shades.
