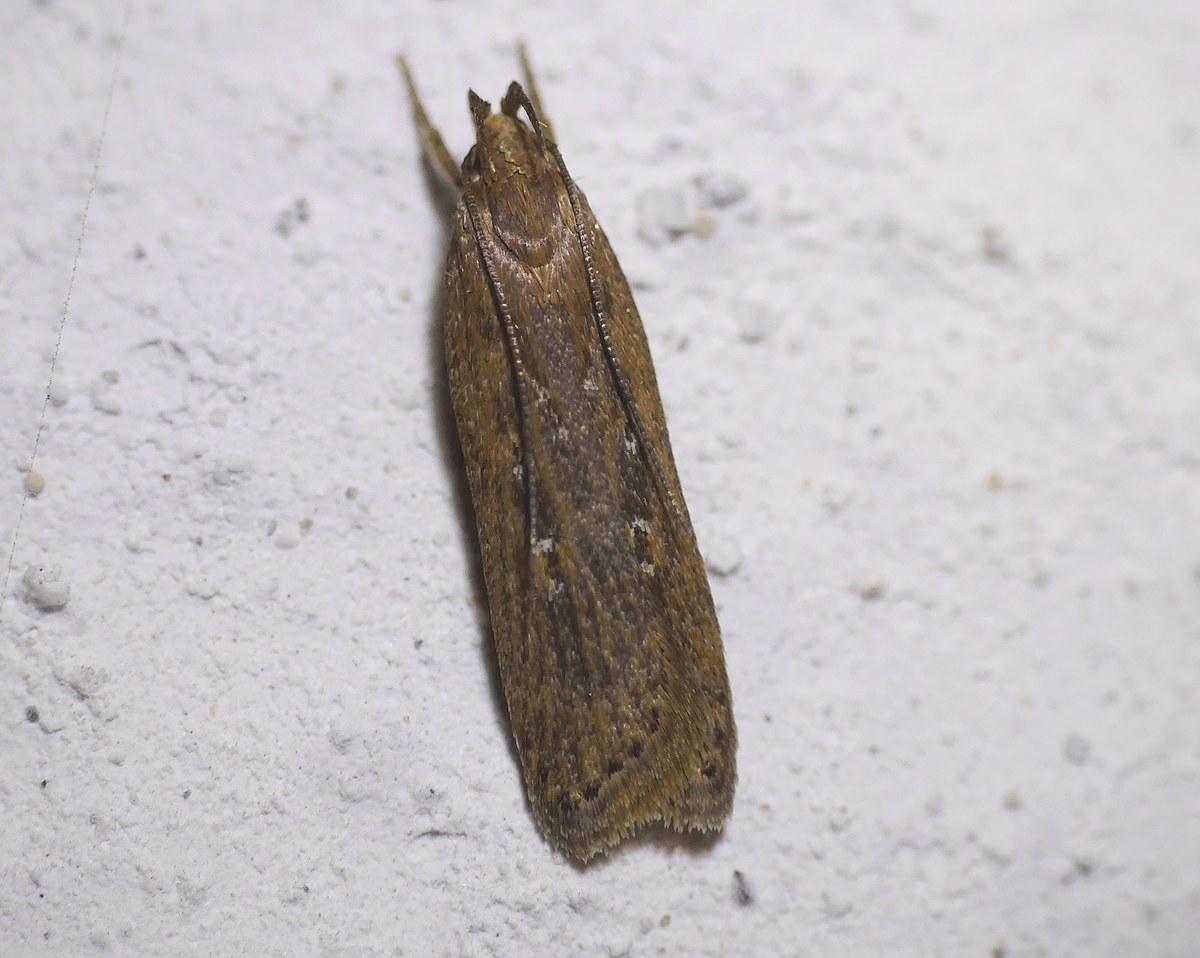

Scientific classification
- Kingdom: Animalia
- Phylum: Arthropoda
- Class: Insecta
- Order: Lepidoptera
- Family: Gelechiidae
- Genus: Helcystogramma
- Species: H. triannulella

Binomial name
- Helcystogramma triannulella (Herrich-Schäffer, 1854)

Synonyms
- List: Anacampsis triannulella Herrich-Schäffer, 1854; Gelechia sepiella Steudel, 1866; Brachmia triannulella var. cinerea Caradja, 1931; Brachmia macroscopa Meyrick, 1932; Onebala triannulella Herrich-Schäffer, 1854

= Helcystogramma triannulella =

Species of moth

Helcystogramma triannulella is a species of moth in the family Gelechiidae. It was originally described by Gottlieb August Wilhelm Herrich-Schäffer in 1854. It is found in south-western and south-eastern Siberia, the Caucasus, Transcaucasia, Kazakhstan, Korea, Japan, China, northern India and large parts of Europe, except Ireland, Great Britain, the Netherlands, Denmark, Scandinavia, the Baltic region and the western Balkan Peninsula.

The wingspan is 12–15 mm. There are several generations between May and October in southern Europe.

The larvae feed on Ipomoea batatas, Convolvulus arvensis, Calystegia sepium and Calystegia japonica. They live in a folded leaf, held together by spinning.
