= Wild morning-glory =

Wild morning-glory is a common name for two plant species:

- Convolvulus arvensis, a native of Europe and Asia
- Calystegia sepium, a subcosmopolitan species also called hedge bindweed
