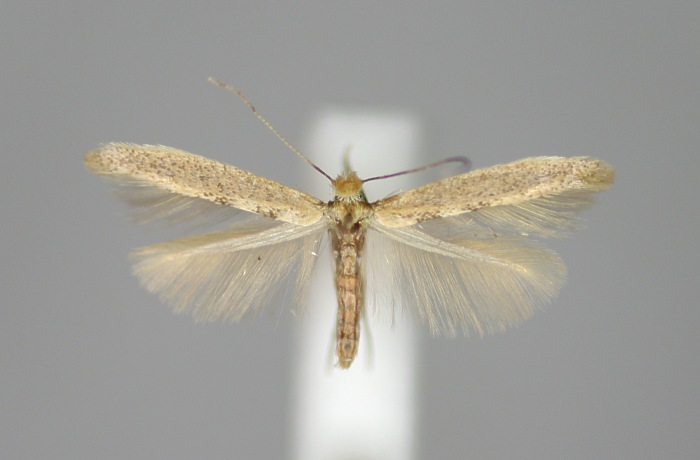

Scientific classification
- Domain: Eukaryota
- Kingdom: Animalia
- Phylum: Arthropoda
- Class: Insecta
- Order: Lepidoptera
- Family: Bedelliidae
- Genus: Bedellia
- Species: B. somnulentella

Binomial name
- Bedellia somnulentella (Zeller, 1847)

Synonyms
- Lyonetia somnulentella Zeller, 1847; Bedellia orpheella Stainton, 1849; Bedellia convolvulella Fologne, 1860; Bedellia mnesileuca Meyrick, 1928; Bedellia ipomoeae Bradley, 1953; Bedellia staintoniella Clemens, 1860; Bedellia annuligera Meyrick, 1928; Bedellia autoconis Meyrick, 1930

= Bedellia somnulentella =

Sweet potato leaf miner

Species of moth

Bedellia somnulentella, the sweet potato leaf miner, is a moth in the family Bedelliidae.

== Description ==
The wingspan is 8–10 mm.

The larvae feed on Calystegia pubescens, Calystegia sepium, Convolvulus althaeoides, Convolvulus arvensis, Convolvulus siculus, Convolvulus tricolour, Ipomoea batatas and Ipomoea purpurea. They mine the leaves of their host plant.

== Distribution ==
Originally from Asia, where its food plants are found, it has reached a nearly cosmopolitan distribution and has been recorded from Russia, Ukraine, Georgia, southern Kazakhstan, Kirgizia, Uzbekistan, nearly all of Europe, the Middle East, Africa, India, Japan, North America, Australia, New Zealand and Oceania.

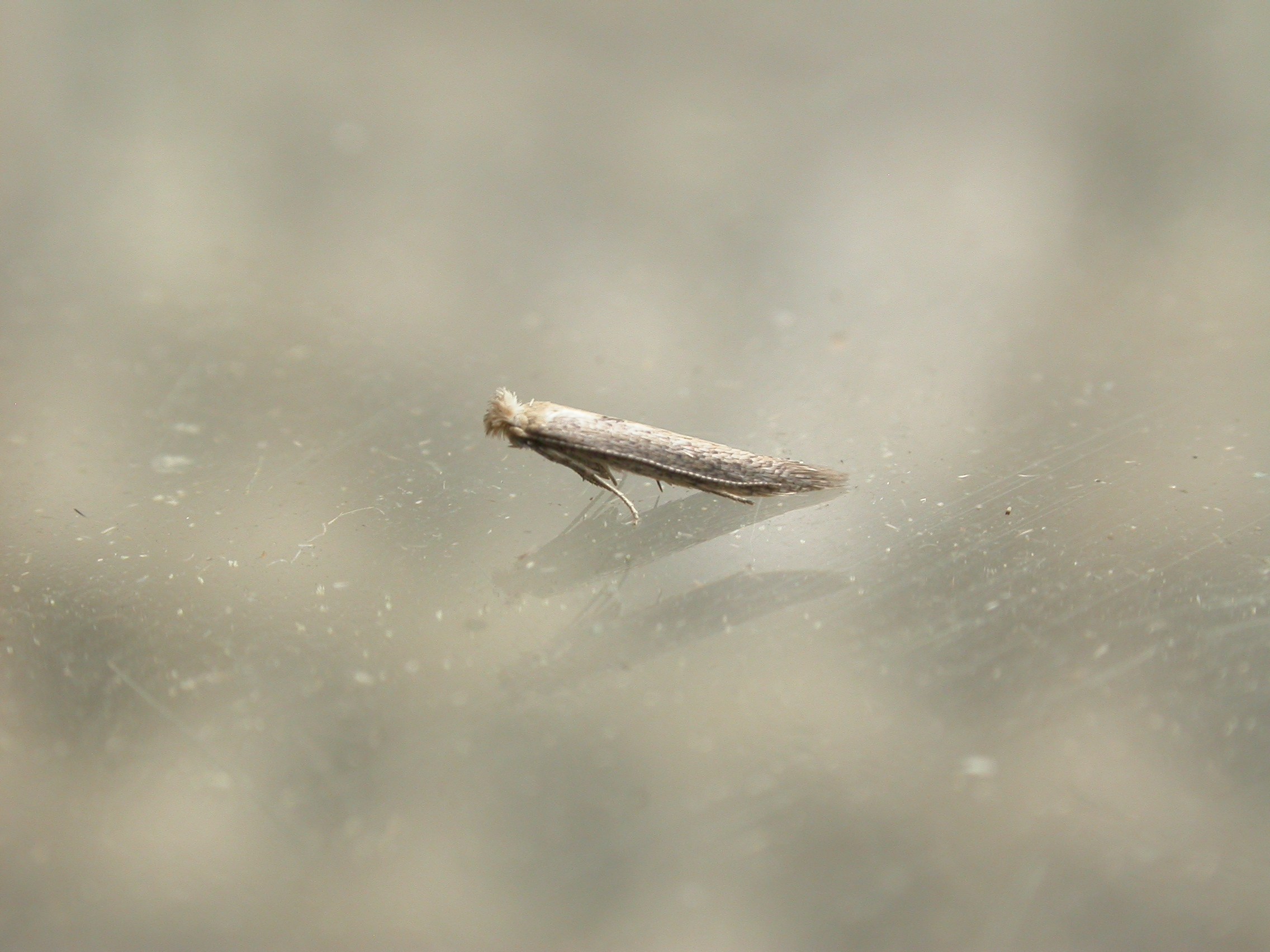

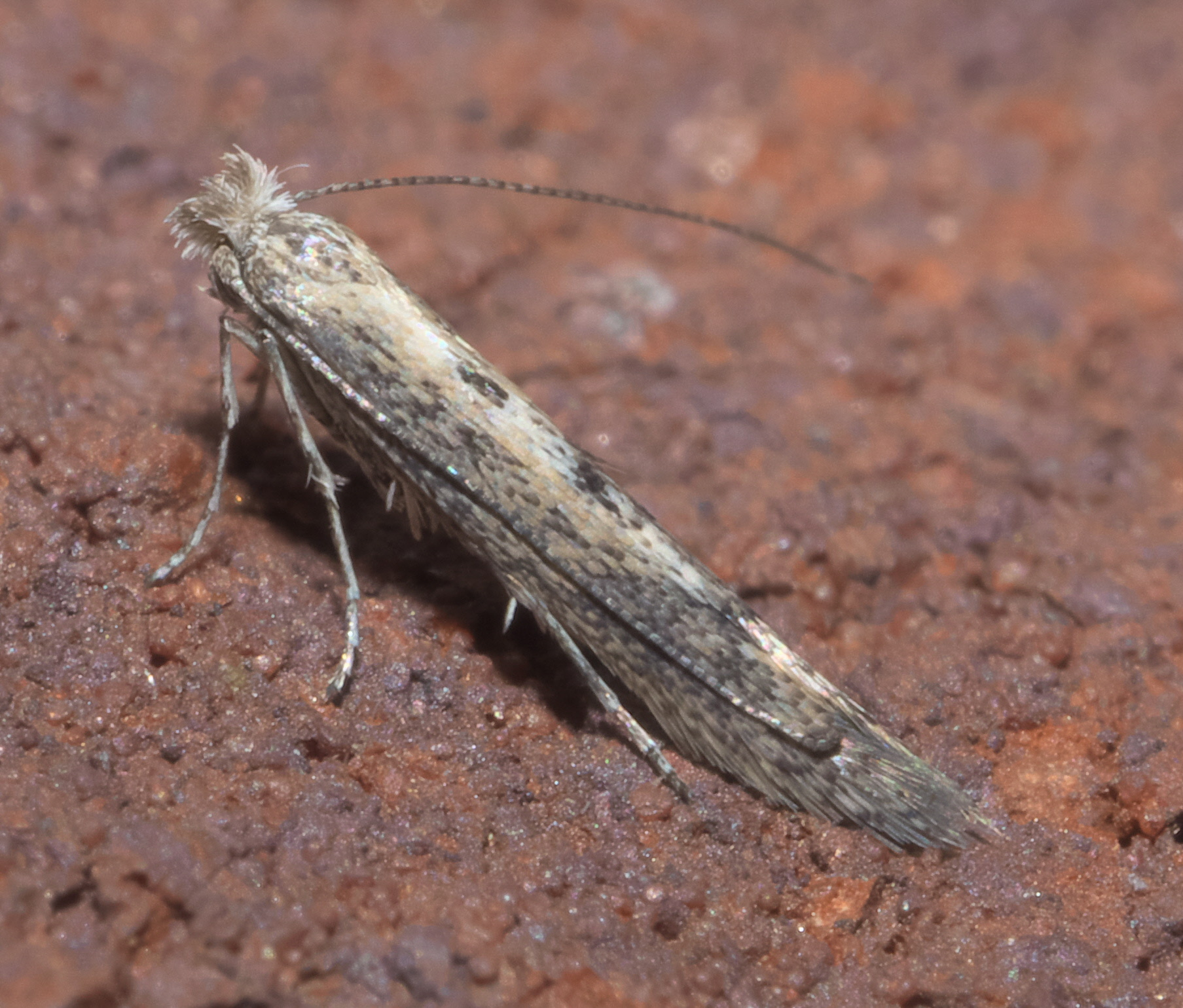
Bedellia somnulentella, morning-glory leaf miner, size: 4.8 mm

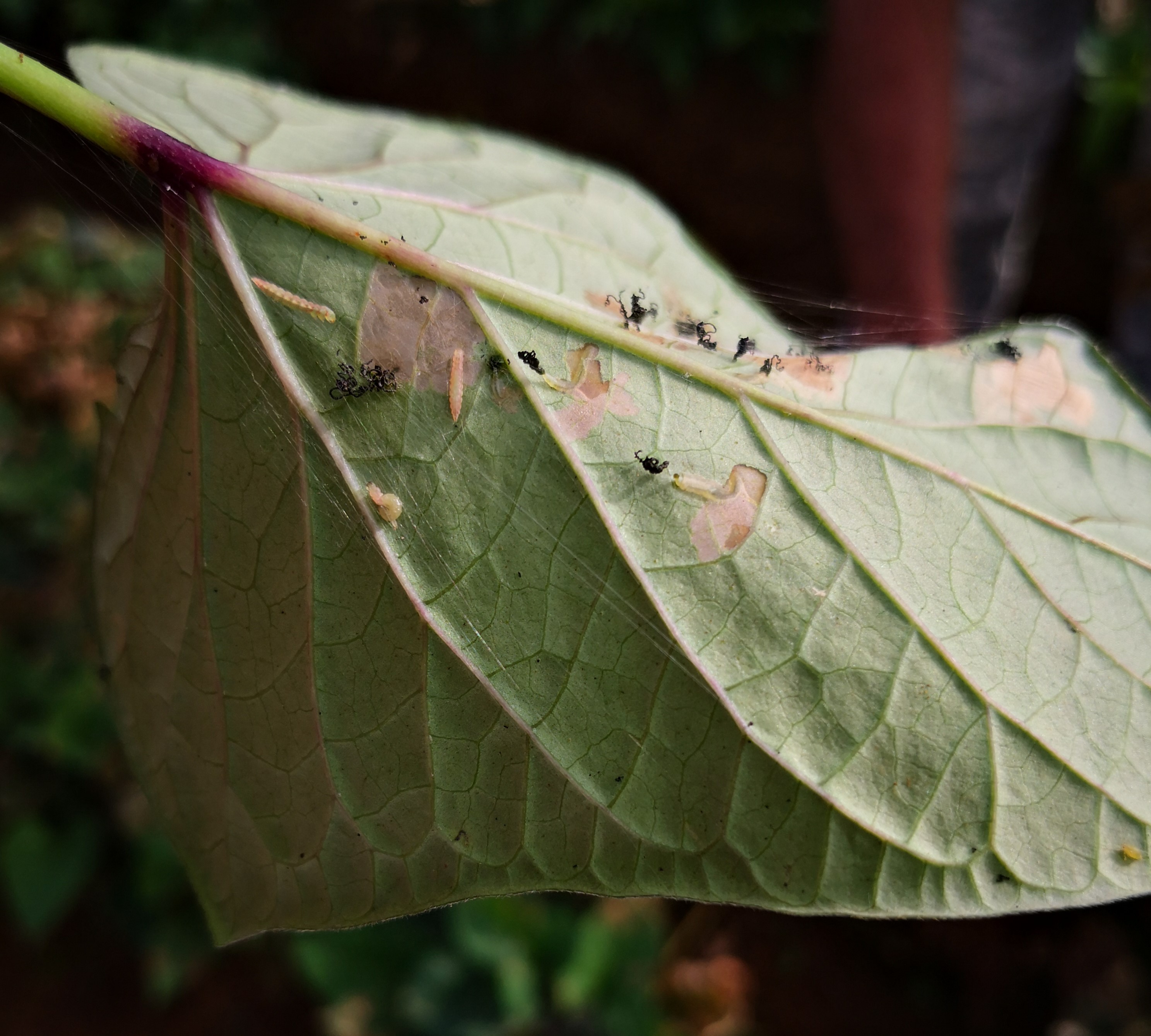
Sweetpotato leaf with leaf miner larvae, webbing, and frass

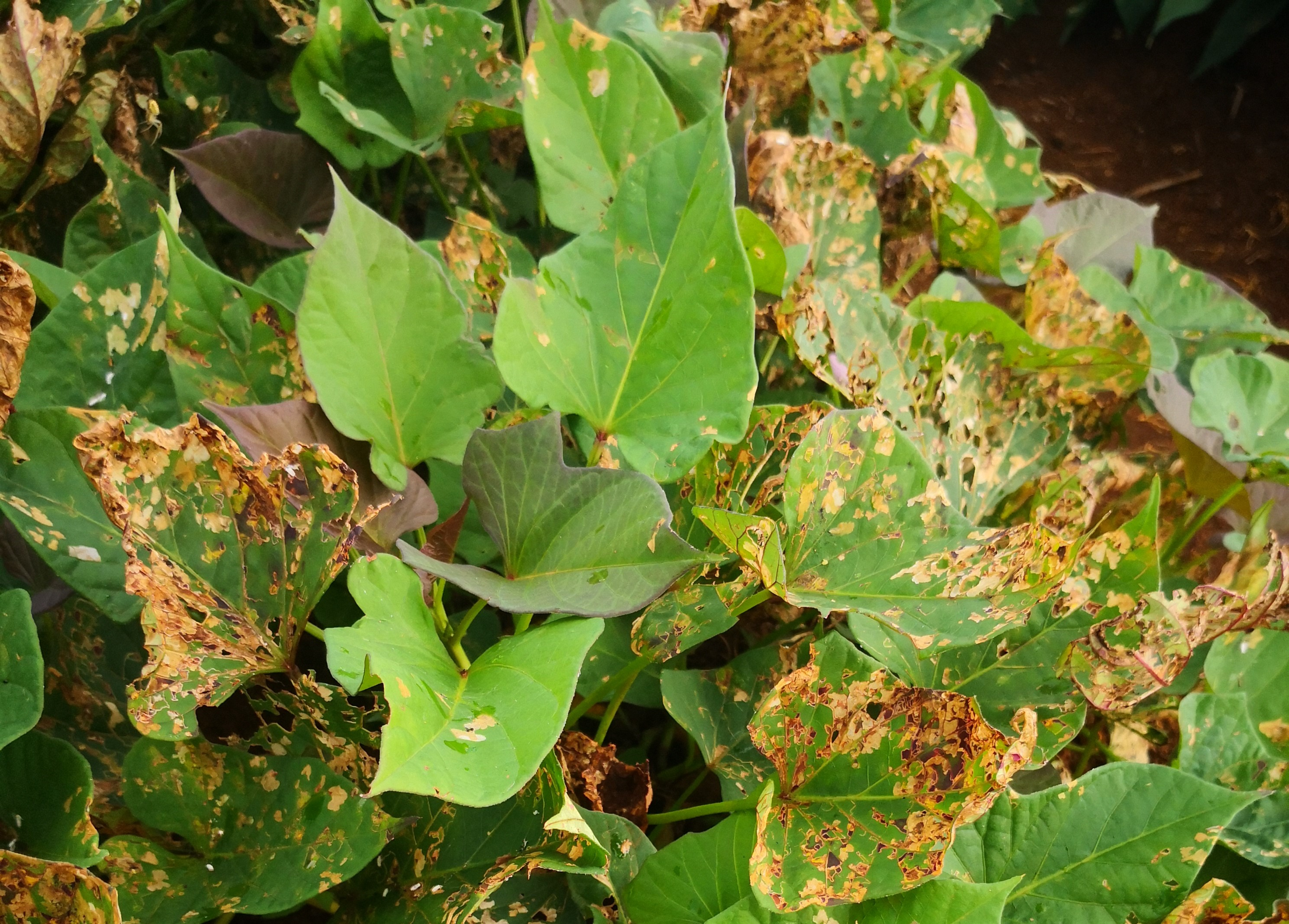
Sweet potato plant with leaf miner damage
