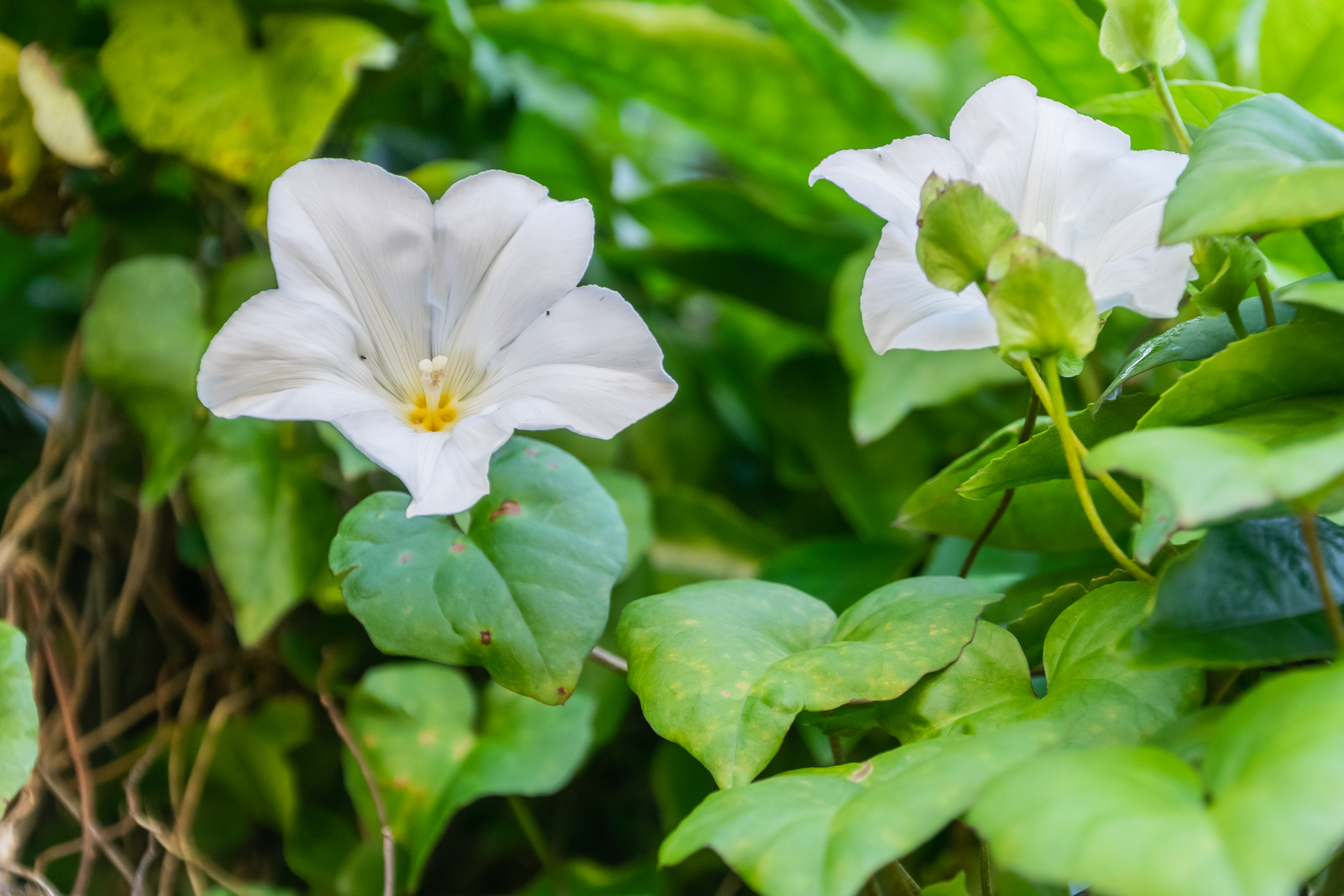
- Convolvulus tuguriorum in Abel Tasman National Park

Scientific classification
- Kingdom: Plantae
- Clade: Tracheophytes
- Clade: Angiosperms
- Clade: Eudicots
- Clade: Asterids
- Order: Solanales
- Family: Convolvulaceae
- Genus: Convolvulus
- Species: C. tuguriorum

Binomial name
- Convolvulus tuguriorum G.Forst.

Synonyms
- Calystegia tuguriorum (G.Forst.) R.Br. ex Hook.f.; Volvulus tuguriorum (G.Forst.) Kuntze

= Convolvulus tuguriorum =

Species of flowering plant

Convolvulus tuguriorum, commonly known as climbing convolvulus and the New Zealand bindweed, is a species of climbing plant in the family Convolvulaceae. It grows in a vine-like or scrambiling manner. It has heart-shaped leaves and large funnel-shaped white or pink flowers. C. tuguriorum is native to Chile and New Zealand and is also present on Tristan da Cunha and the Juan Fernández Islands. It was first described by the German botanist Georg Forster in 1786. This species was formerly considered part of Calystegia, but a 2025 study proposed merging the genus within Convolvulus, a treatment followed by the Plants of the World Online database.

== Description ==
Convolvulus tuguriorum is a climbing plant that grows in a vine-like or scrambiling manner and belongs to the family Convolvulaceae. Its slender, branching stems grow closely together in dense groups. Its petioles are up to 40 mm long. Leaves are arranged alternately and are typically 40 × 30 mm in length and width. The leaves are broadly oval, triangular or heart-shaped, with smooth or wavy edges. They have a heart-shaped base and a pointed or long-pointed tip.

Its peduncles are round or have slight wings along the sides. Its bracts are broadly oval to almost round, with heart-shaped bases and small pointed tips. The sepals are similar in appearance to the bracts and are the same size or smaller. The flowers are funnel-shaped, white or pink, and usually measure about 50–60 mm across. The capsules are broadly oval in shape and 8–12 mm long. The seeds are orange and smooth.

== Taxonomy ==
Convolvulus tuguriorum was first described by the German botanist Georg Forster in 1786. The species has two synonyms: Calystegia tuguriorum and Volvulus tuguriorum. As of 2026, there are 228 species of the genus Convolvulus accepted by the Plants of the World Online (POWO) taxonomic database. The genus has a worldwide distribution. Nepomuceno et al. (2025) proposed merging the genus Calystegia to Convolvulus, a treatment followed by POWO.

=== Etymology ===
The etymology (word origin) of the genus name Convolvulus comes from the Latin convolvere, meaning "to twine around". The specific epithet (second part of the scientific name) tuguriorum means "growing around huts". The plant is commonly known as climbing convolvulus and the New Zealand bindweed. In Māori it is known as pōwhiwhi.

== Ecology ==
The seeds are dispersed by gravity and possibly by wind and water. The members of the Convolvulaceae are primarily pollinated by insects. The kererū (Hemiphaga novaeseelandiae) eats the leaves and possibly also the buds and flowers. C. tuguriorum also plays host to a native bindweed gall mite which forms swollen, pouch-like galls on the leaves. The larvae of the yellow featherfoot (Stathmopoda skellonii) feed on the plant's seeds. The capsules are also eaten by the larvae of the sweet potato leaf miner (Bedellia somnulentella).

== Distribution ==
Convolvulus tuguriorum is native to Chile (including Valdivia, the Chiloé Archipelago, and the Juan Fernández Islands) New Zealand (including the Three Kings Islands, Chatham Islands, and Stewart Island), and Tristan da Cunha. This is an example of an Amphi-Pacific distribution. In New Zealand, it is common throughout most of the country, except Stewart Island where it said to be rare.

=== Habitat ===
Convolvulus tuguriorum primarily occurs in coastal to lowland environments. In New Zealand, it is typically found in shrubland and along forest edges, and is sometimes found around wetland boundaries. C. tuguriorum tends to favour grey shrublands, exposed lava formations and open, rocky terrain. It occurs up to 500 m (1,600 ft) above sea level. In Tristan da Cunha, it has been recorded growing in association with grass from the genus Spartina.

== Works cited ==
Books

- Allan, H.H (1961). Flora of New Zealand. Vol. 1. P D Hasselberg Government Printer Publications. ISBN 9780477010566.
- Cheeseman, T. F. (1906). Manual of the New Zealand flora (1 ed.). Wellington, New Zealand: New Zealand Board of Science and Art.
- Crowe, Andrew (2009). Which Native Forest Plant? New Ecology Edition. Auckland, New Zealand: Penguin Books. ISBN 978-0-14-300899-6.

Journals

- Cronk, Q.C.B.; Clarke, G.C.S. (1981). "Convolvulaceae". Review of Palaeobotany and Palynology. 33 (1): 117–135. doi:10.1016/0034-6667(81)90086-5.
- Burrows, C. J. (1994). "Fruit types and seed dispersal modes of woody plants in Ahuriri Summit Bush, Port Hills, western Banks Peninsula, Canterbury, New Zealand". New Zealand Journal of Botany. 32 (2): 169–181. doi:10.1080/0028825X.1994.10410366. ISSN 0028-825X.
- Burrows, C. J. (1996). "Germination behaviour of the seeds of seven New Zealand vine species". New Zealand Journal of Botany. 34 (1): 93–102. doi:10.1080/0028825X.1996.10412696. ISSN 0028-825X.
- Brummitt, R. K.; Groves, E. W. (1981). "The Occurrence of Calystegia tuguriorum (Convolvulaceae) in the Tristan da Cunha Islands". Kew Bulletin. 36 (2): 422. doi:10.2307/4113614.
- Lamb, K. P. (1960). "A check list of New Zealand plant galls (Zoocecidia)" (PDF). Transactions of the Royal Society of New Zealand. 88 (1): 121–139.
- Nepomuceno, Silmara; Fay, Michael F; Simões, Ana Rita Giraldes; Buril, Maria Teresa (2025). "Character reconstruction and re-circumscription of the genus Convolvulus L. (Convolvulaceae)". Botanical Journal of the Linnean Society. 209 (4): 359–380. doi:10.1093/botlinnean/boaf023. ISSN 0024-4074.
- Ogden, John (1978). "Variation in Calystegia R.Br. (Convolvulaceae) in New Zealand". New Zealand Journal of Botany. 16 (1): 123–140. doi:10.1080/0028825X.1978.10429665. ISSN 0028-825X.
- Roux, J. P.; Ryan, P. G.; Milton, S. J.; Moloney, C. L. (1992). "Vegetation and checklist of Inaccessible Island, central South Atlantic Ocean, with notes on Nightingale Island". Bothalia. 22 (1). South African National Biodiversity Institute: 93–109. doi:10.4102/abc.v22i1.828. ISSN 2311-9284.
- Sullivan, Jon J.; Burrows, Colin J.; Dugdale, John S. (1995). "Insect predation of seeds of native New Zealand woody plants in some central South Island localities". New Zealand Journal of Botany. 33 (3): 355–364. doi:10.1080/0028825X.1995.10412962. ISSN 0028-825X.

Websites

- De Lange, Peter (2026). "Convolvulus tuguriorum". New Zealand Plant Conservation Network.
- "Convolvulus tuguriorum G.Forst". Plants of the World Online. Archived from the original on 3 September 2026 – via Royal Botanic Gardens, Kew.
- "Convolvulus L." Plants of the World Online. Archived from the original on 8 June 2025 – via Royal Botanic Gardens, Kew.
