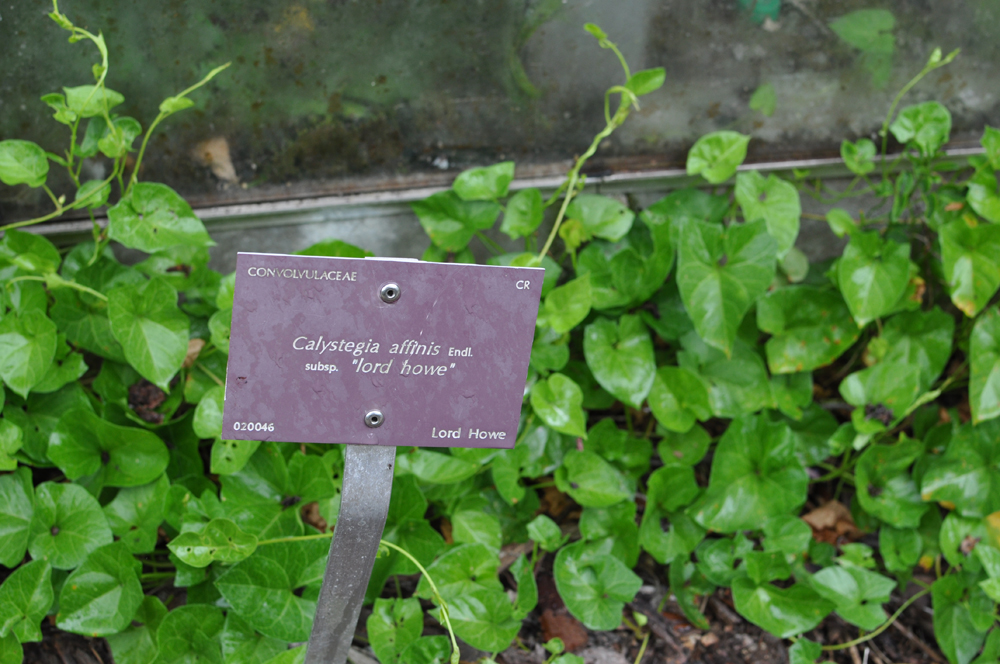

Conservation status
- Critically endangered (EPBC Act)

Scientific classification
- Kingdom: Plantae
- Clade: Tracheophytes
- Clade: Angiosperms
- Clade: Eudicots
- Clade: Asterids
- Order: Solanales
- Family: Convolvulaceae
- Genus: Convolvulus
- Species: C. similis

Binomial name
- Convolvulus similis S.C.Nepom. & Buril

Synonyms
- Calystegia affinis Endl.; Convolvulus affinis (Endl.) Maiden

= Convolvulus similis =

Species of flowering plant in the morning glory family

Convolvulus similis is a critically endangered species of climbing or creeping vine in the plant family Convolvulaceae. It is endemic to Lord Howe Island and Norfolk Island. In 2003 only about 45 mature plants were known, with about 40 of those on Norfolk Island.

== Description ==
Convolvulus similis is a thin-stemmed plant in the genus Calystegia which climbs by twining. It has sparse alternate, arrow-headed leaves about 6 cm x 5 cm. The flowers are axillary, solitary, pink with five cream longitudinal bands and are funnel-shaped. They have large persistent bracteoles enclosing the calyx which has five sepals and five petals. The fruit is a papery capsule which splits longitudinally into four valves. The plant is thought to reproduce both clonally and by seed.

== Taxonomy ==
Convolvulus similis was first described by Endlicher in 1833. In 1904, Joseph Maiden renamed it Convolvulus affinis, but this is considered an illegal name by the Commonwealth Heads of Australian Herbaria. The other synonyms (given above) are illegal names, with the species concept having been refined by P.S. Green in 1994 in Flora of Australia. The current name of this species according the Plants of the World Online databse is Convolvulus similis.

== Conservation status ==
It is classified as "Critically endangered" under the EPBC Act.
