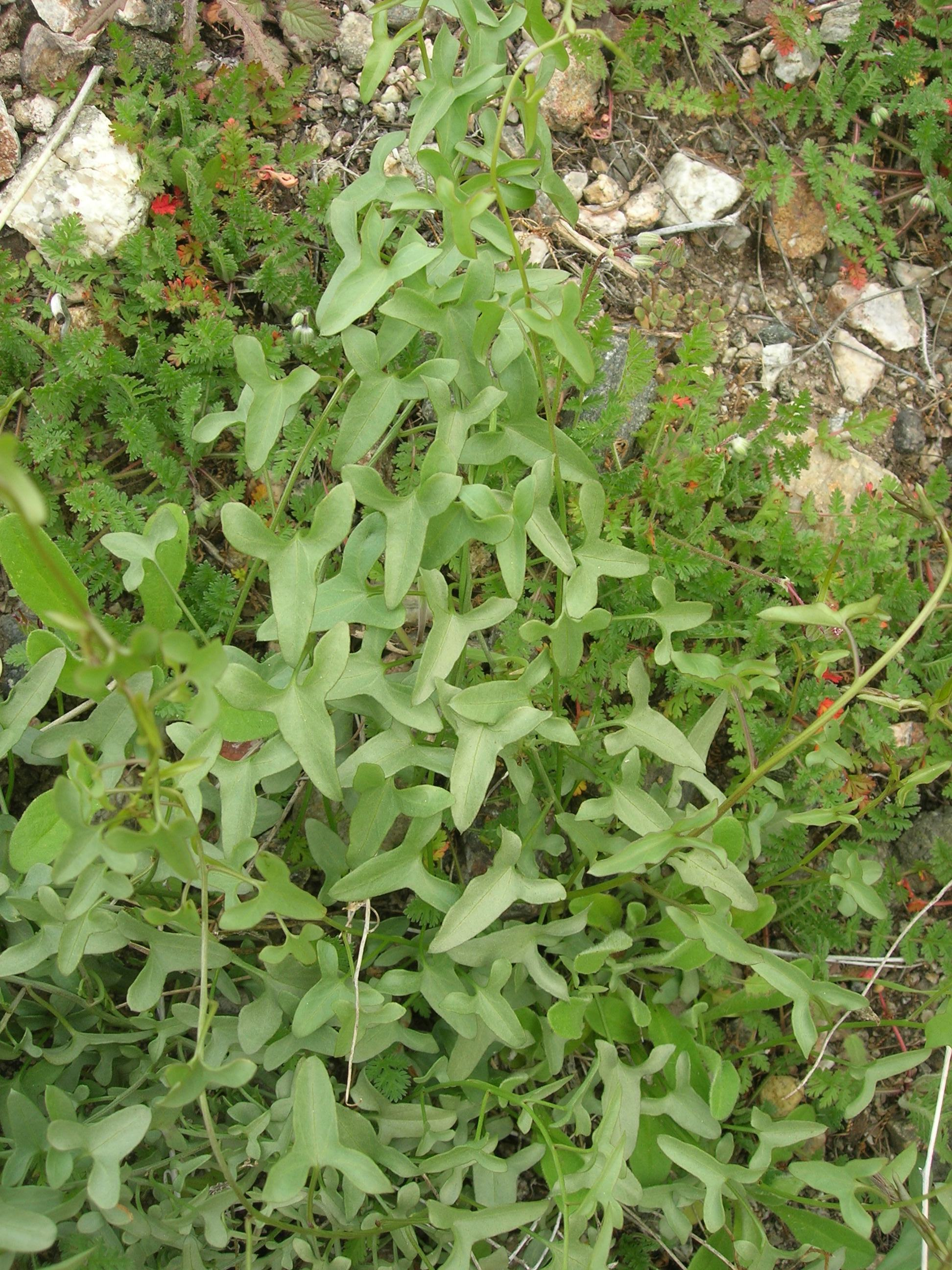

Conservation status
- Apparently Secure (NatureServe)

Scientific classification
- Kingdom: Plantae
- Clade: Tracheophytes
- Clade: Angiosperms
- Clade: Eudicots
- Clade: Asterids
- Order: Solanales
- Family: Convolvulaceae
- Genus: Convolvulus
- Species: C. peirsonii

Binomial name
- Convolvulus peirsonii Abrams

Synonyms
- Calystegia peirsonii (Abrams) Brummitt

= Convolvulus peirsonii =

Species of flowering plant

Convolvulus peirsonii is a species of morning glory known by the common name Peirson's false bindweed.

It is endemic to Los Angeles County, California, occurring at the junction of the San Gabriel Mountains and the Mojave Desert in the vicinity of the Antelope Valley.

== Description ==
Convolvulus peirsonii is a rhizomatous perennial herb producing low-lying or climbing stems up to 40 centimeters long, and hairless and waxy in texture. The small leaves are up to 2 centimeters long, lobed, and generally triangular in shape.

The inflorescence produces flowers at the end of peduncles a few centimeters long. The white funnel-shaped flower is typical of morning glories and reaches up to 4 centimeters wide. The bracts form at the base of the peduncle and are short and rounded with an indented tip, usually only partially obscuring the calyx.

The species is most similar to Convolvulus occidentalis which can occur in the same region occasionally. However that species differs in longer, more strongly pointed bracts, and the fact that those bracts form several millimeters below the peduncle on the stem. Additionally C. occidentalis generally has more triangular leaves with less distinct lobing.
