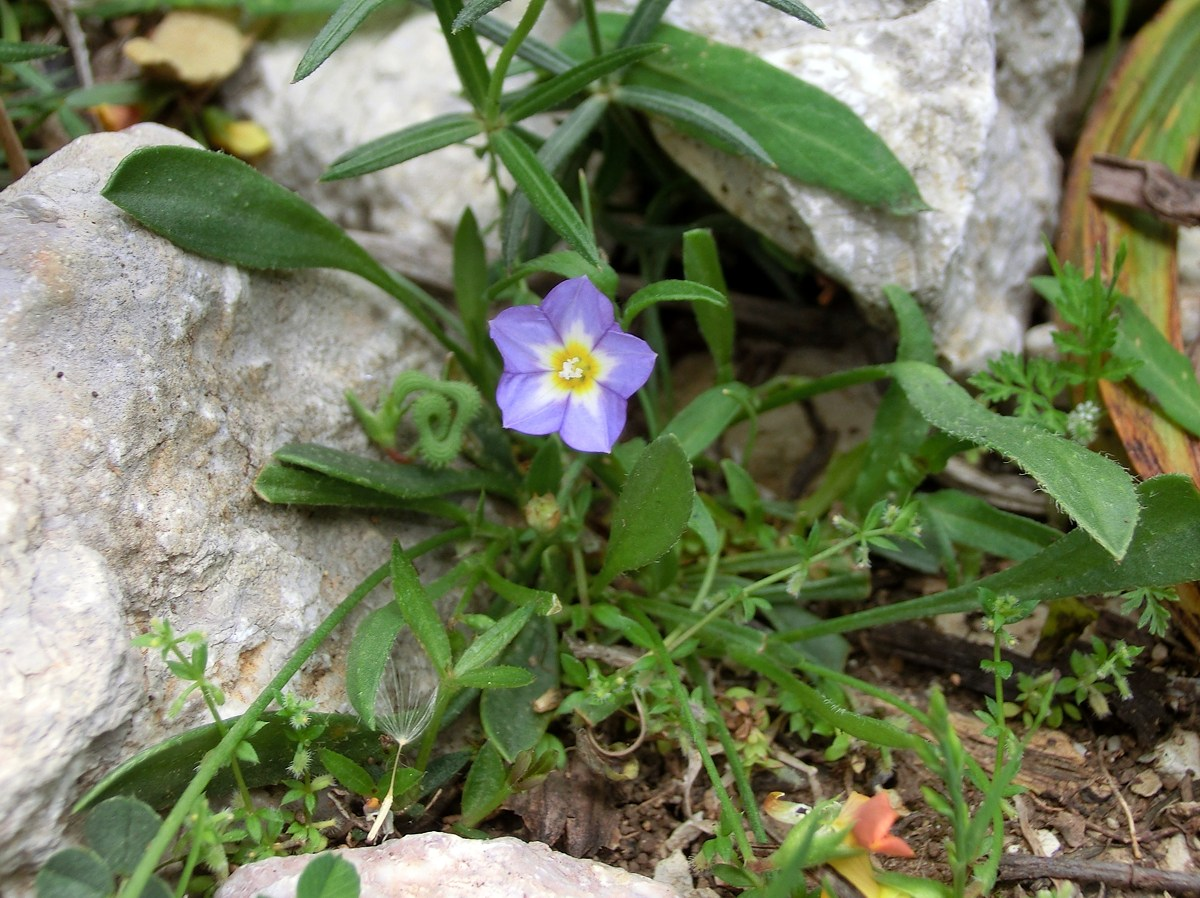

Scientific classification
- Kingdom: Plantae
- Clade: Tracheophytes
- Clade: Angiosperms
- Clade: Eudicots
- Clade: Asterids
- Order: Solanales
- Family: Convolvulaceae
- Genus: Convolvulus
- Species: C. siculus

Binomial name
- Convolvulus siculus L.

Synonyms
- Convolvulus ovatus

= Convolvulus siculus =

Species of plant

Convolvulus siculus is a species of annual herb in the family Convolvulaceae. They have a self-supporting growth form and simple, broad leaves and dry fruit. Individuals can grow to 39 cm tall.

== Sources ==
This article incorporates text from a free content work. Licensed under CC0 (license statement/permission). Text taken from Convolvulus siculus. Encyclopedia of Life.
