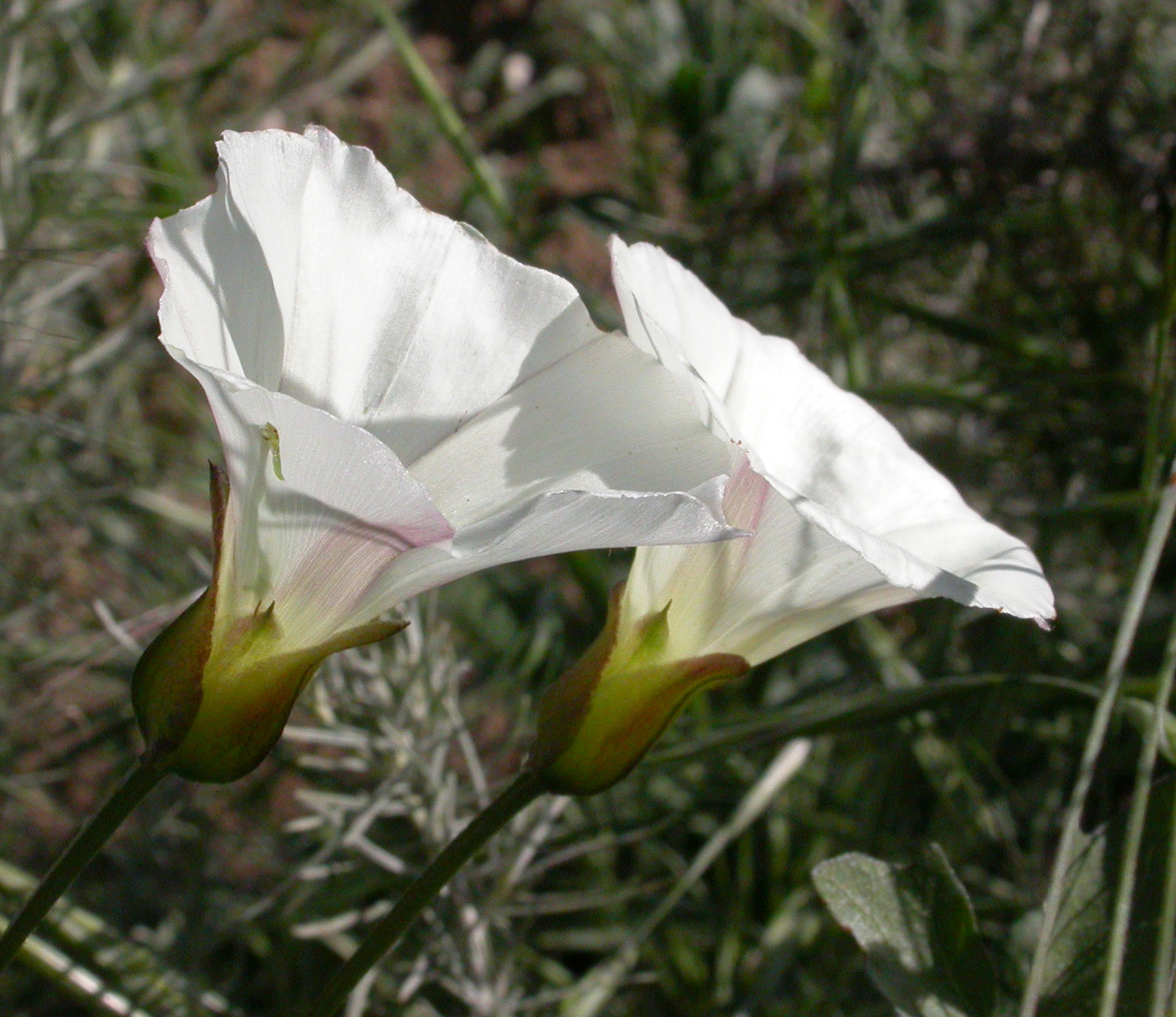

Scientific classification
- Kingdom: Plantae
- Clade: Tracheophytes
- Clade: Angiosperms
- Clade: Eudicots
- Clade: Asterids
- Order: Solanales
- Family: Convolvulaceae
- Genus: Convolvulus
- Species: C. macrostegia

Binomial name
- Convolvulus macrostegia Greene

Synonyms
- Convolvulus macrostegius (Greene) Brummitt; Convolvulus occidentalis var. macrostegius (Greene) Munz; Volvulus macrostegius (Greene) Farw.

= Convolvulus macrostegius =

Species of vine

Convolvulus macrostegius, with the common names island false bindweed and island morning glory, is a species of morning glory in the family Convolvulaceae.

== Distribution ==
The plant is native to California coastal sage and chaparral habitats, along the coasts in Southern California and into Baja California, Mexico.

It is found on all the Channel Islands, source of its common names. It is also commonly found in the Peninsular Ranges, Transverse Ranges, and Outer Southern California Coast Ranges.

== Description ==
Convolvulus macrostegia is a woody perennial herb or small shrub which may be a low herbaceous vine or a stout, woody, climbing plant which can approach 9 metres (30 ft) in length. The triangular leaves may be over 10 centimeters wide.

The vine produces white, to very pale pink, to lavender blooms, often according to drought or temperature. The corollas are 2–6 centimetres (0.79–2.36 in) or more in width.

=== Subspecies ===
According to the Plants of the World Online database, there are two subspecies:

- Convolvulus macrostegius ssp. amplissimus
- Convolvulus macrostegius ssp. macrostegius

== Cultivation ==
Convolvulus macrostegius is cultivated as an ornamental plant, used as a vine and groundcover in native plant, drought tolerant, and wildlife gardens. It is a pollinator plant for native bee species.
