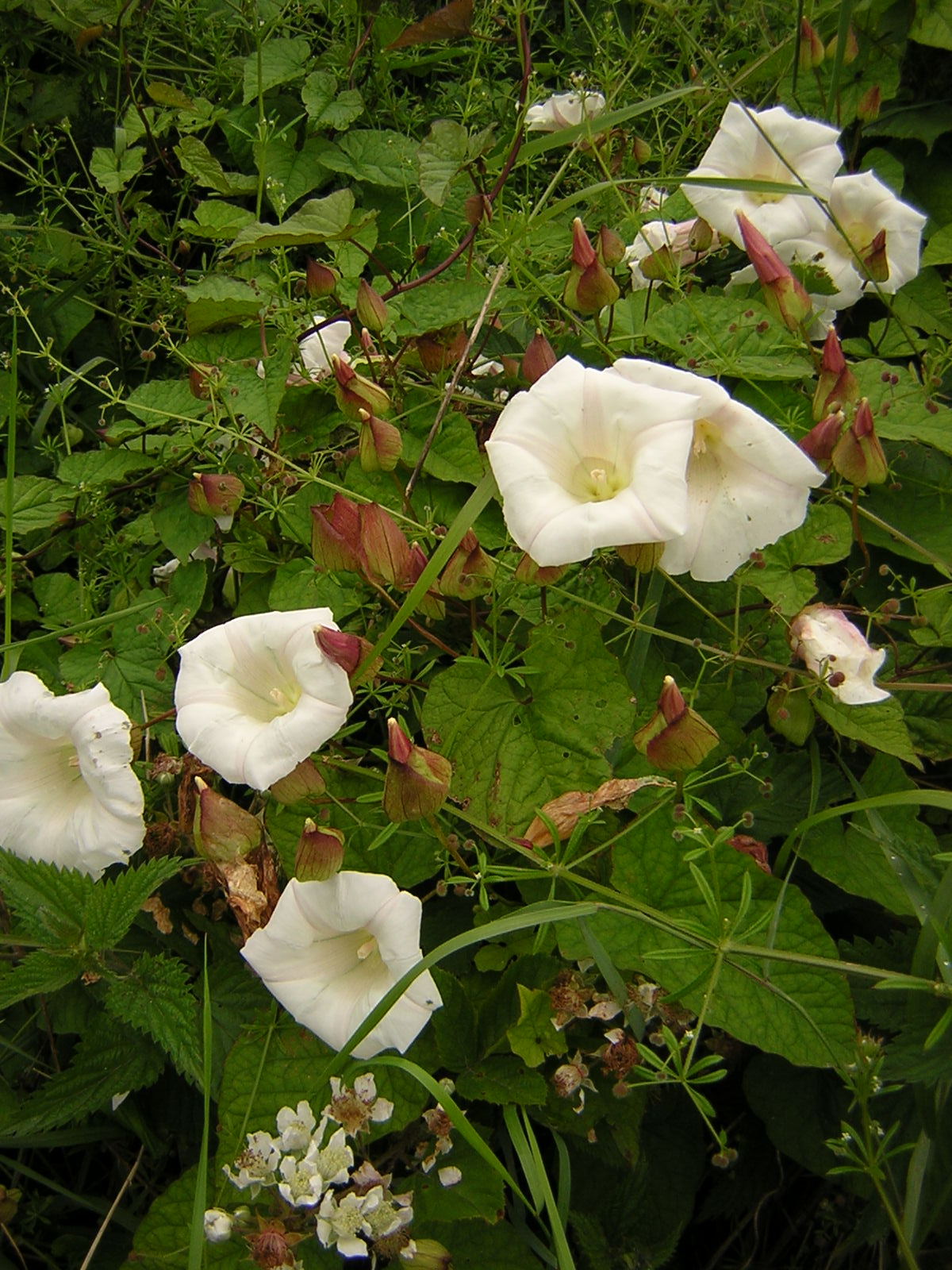

Scientific classification
- Kingdom: Plantae
- Clade: Tracheophytes
- Clade: Angiosperms
- Clade: Eudicots
- Clade: Asterids
- Order: Solanales
- Family: Convolvulaceae
- Genus: Convolvulus
- Species: C. silvaticus

Binomial name
- Convolvulus silvaticus Kit.

Synonyms
- Calystegia sepium subsp. silvatica (Kit.) Batt.; Calystegia silvatica (Kit.) Griseb.; Convolvulus sepium subsp. silvaticus (Kit.) Batt.; Volvulus silvaticus (Kit.) Kuntze

= Convolvulus silvaticus =

Species of morning glory

Convolvulus silvaticus (large bindweed) is the largest species of bindweed and is a strong rampant climber. It is native to southern Europe but has been introduced to many other areas because it is an attractive garden plant. Calystegia silvatica subsp. fraterniflora (Mack. & Bush) Brummitt (short-stalked false bindweed) is native to North America.

It has large, arrow-shaped leaves and showy white trumpet-shaped flowers up to 9 centimeters in diameter. It is considered a weed in some areas where it has escaped cultivation and now grows wild. It spreads easily via hardy rhizomes. There are several subspecies.

== Description ==
Large bindweed is a glabrous herbaceous perennial that twines in a counter-clockwise direction to a height of up to 5 m. The leaves are arranged alternately on the spiralling stem on petioles up to 15 cm. The leaves are dull green above and paler below, simple and sagittate (arrowhead shaped), up to 15 cm long and up to 9 cm wide.

The flowers are white, sometimes narrowly pink on the outside only, produced from late spring to the end of summer (between July and September in northern Europe). The buds are enclosed by large (4.8 cm long), ovate, green bracteoles pouched at the base; during anthesis they strongly overlap. The open flowers are trumpet-shaped and 6–9 cm diameter. After flowering, the fruit develops as an almost spherical capsule, which is hidden by the bracts. It is 1 cm in diameter, containing two to four large, dark brown or black seeds that are shaped like quartered oranges.

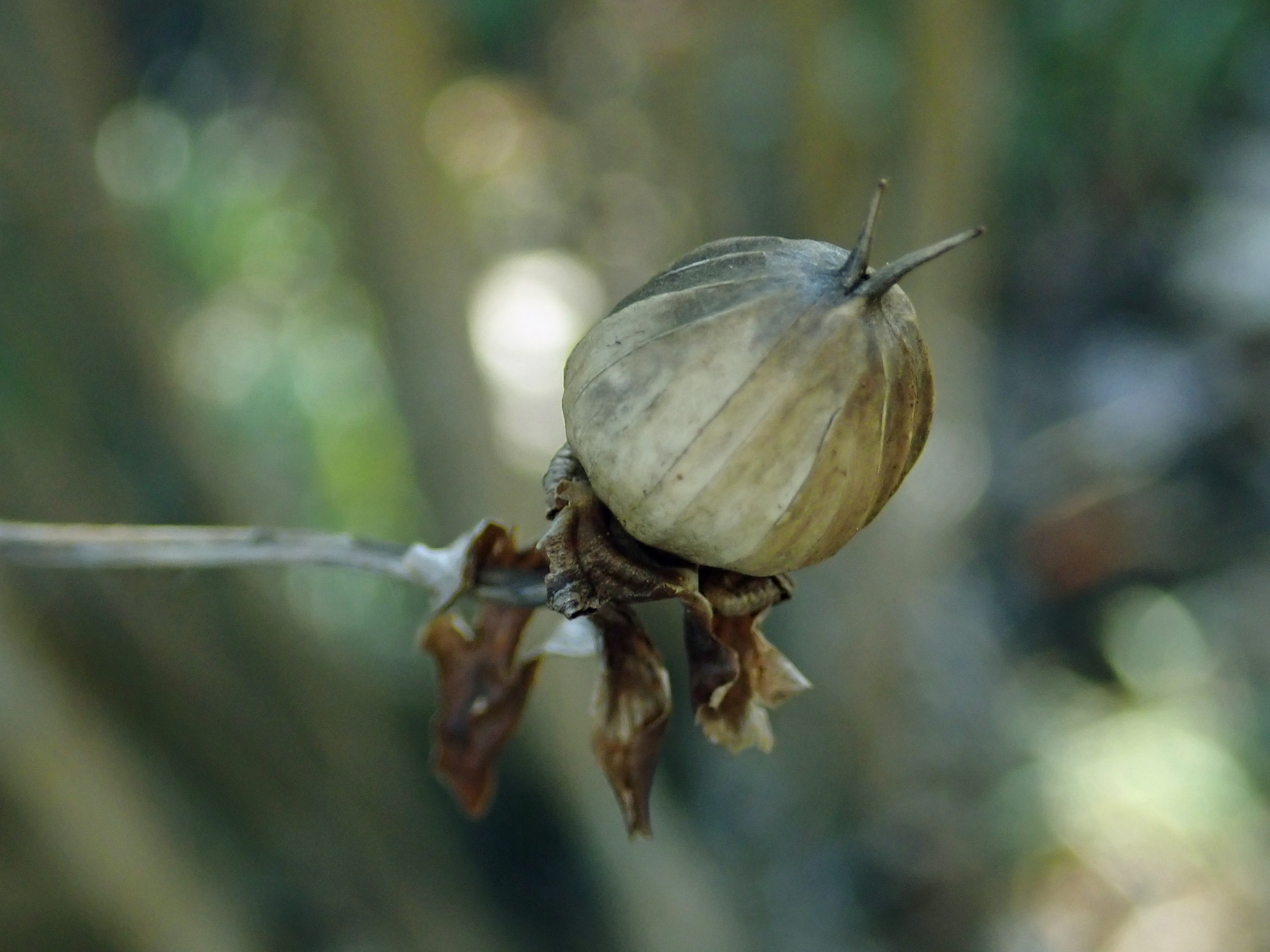
A ripe fruit

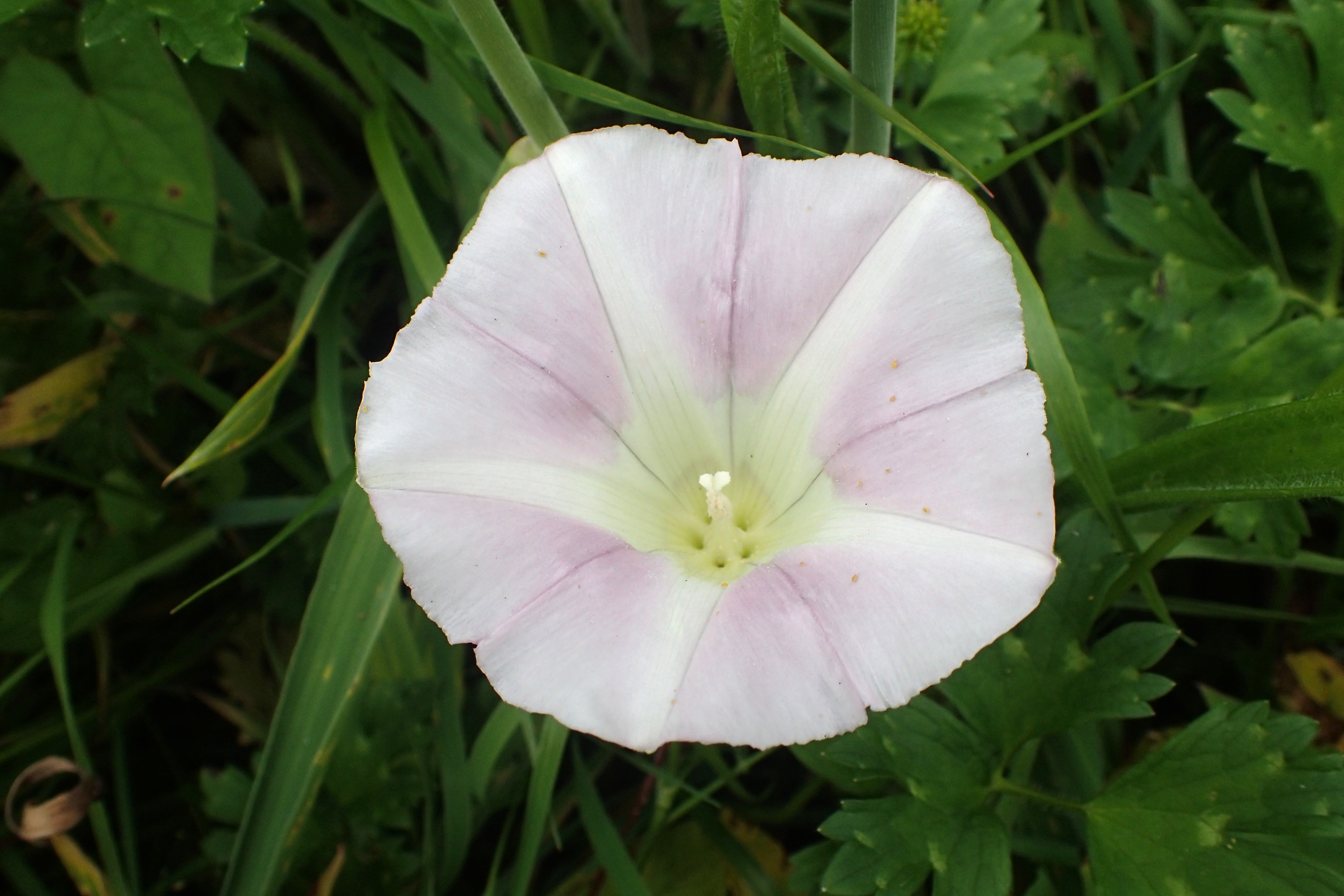
Pink-flowered variety

== Identification ==
The best way to separate large bindweed from hedge bindweed (C. sepium) in flower is by the bracteoles, which subtend the flower and wholly or partially encompass the sepals. Large bindweed has short, wider bracteoles which overlap where they meet, whereas hedge bindweed has narrower, longer ones which leave a gap between them, allowing a glimpse of the sepals.

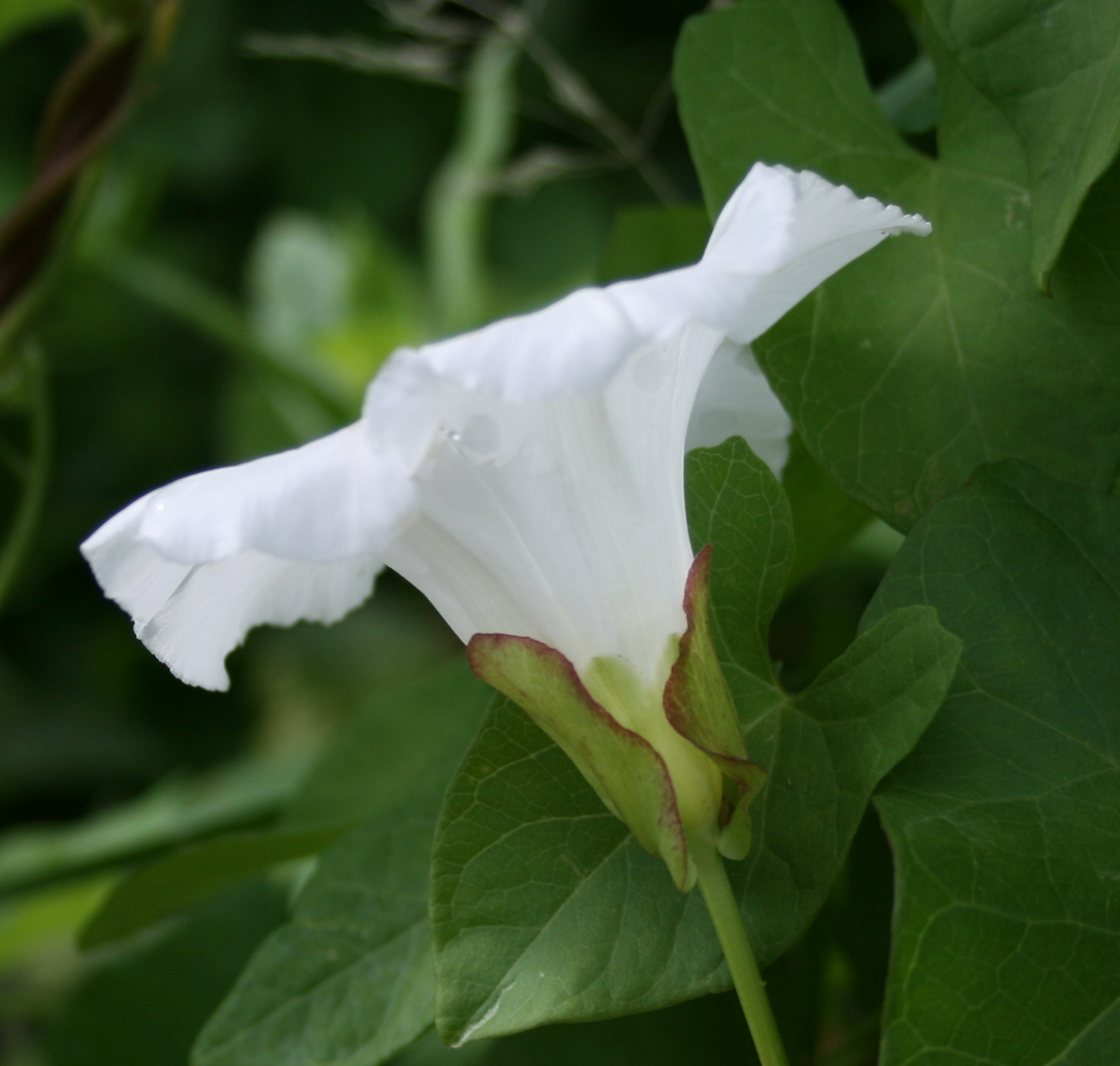
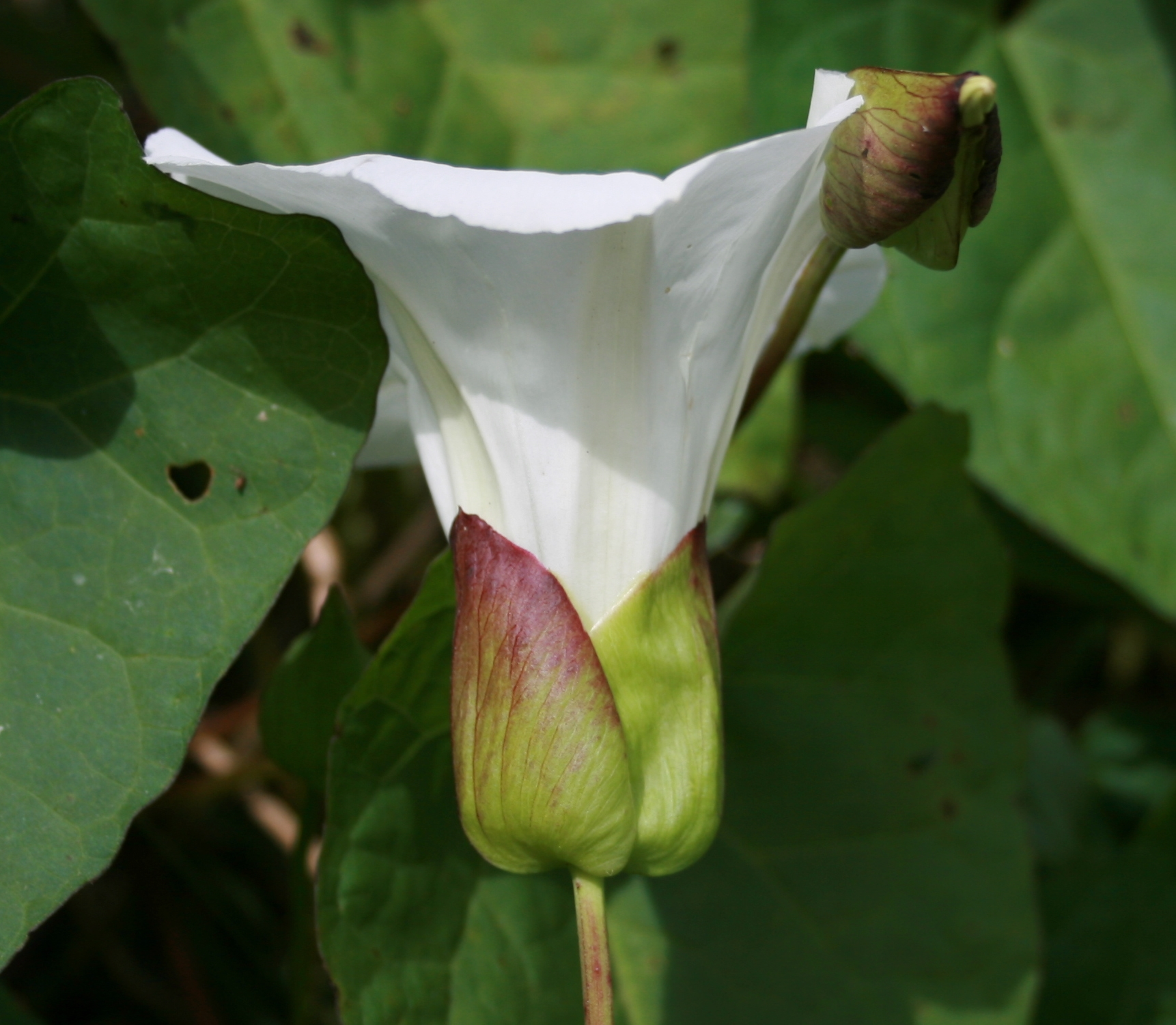
Bracteoles of hedge bindweed (left) and large bindweed (right)

Vegetatively, large bindweed can be distinguished from hedge bindweed by the shape of the sinus - the gap between the lobes at the base of the leaves. The former has a U-shaped sinus, in contrast to the usually V-shaped one in the latter.

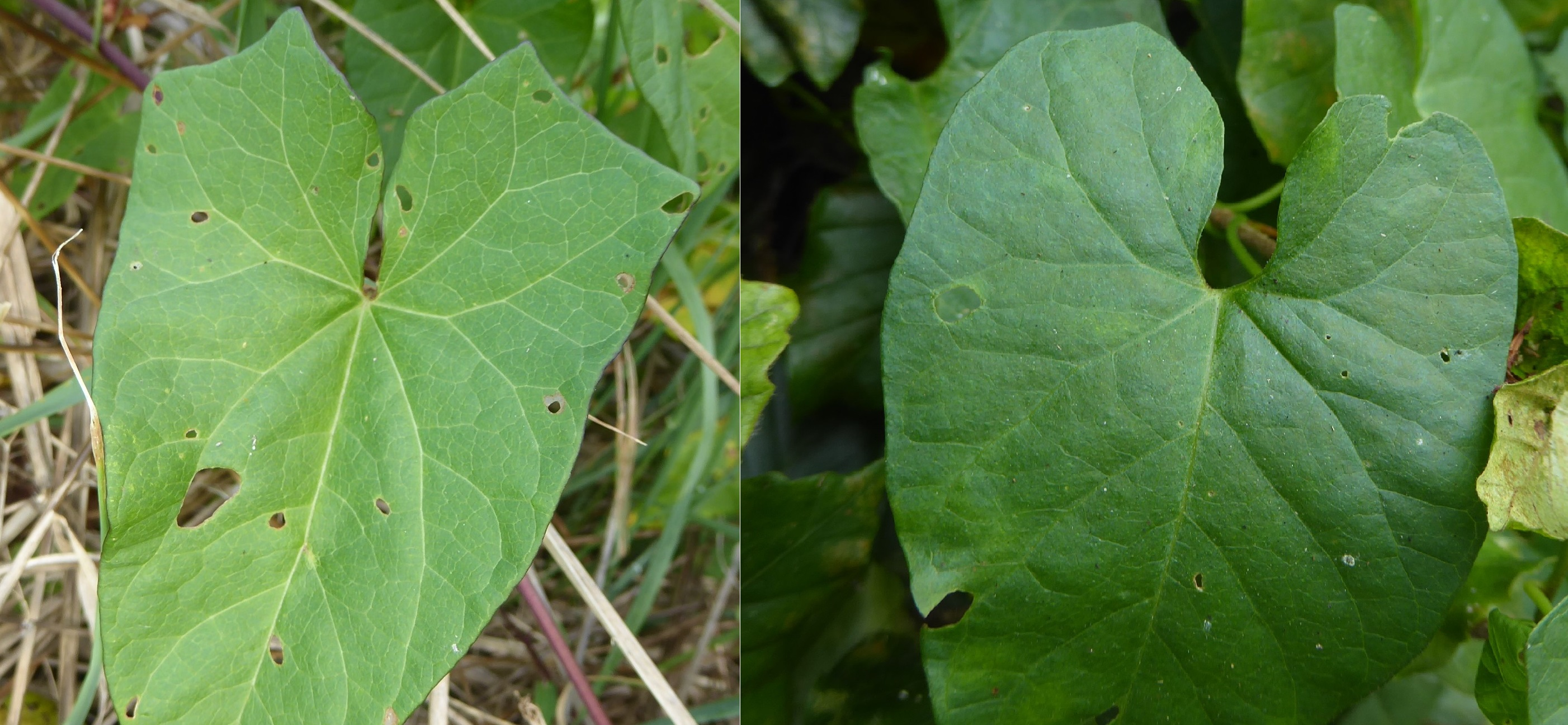
Leaves of hedge (left) and large bindweed (right)

== Taxonomy ==
Common names include "morning glory" (a name which is shared with hundreds of other species) and "giant bindweed".
