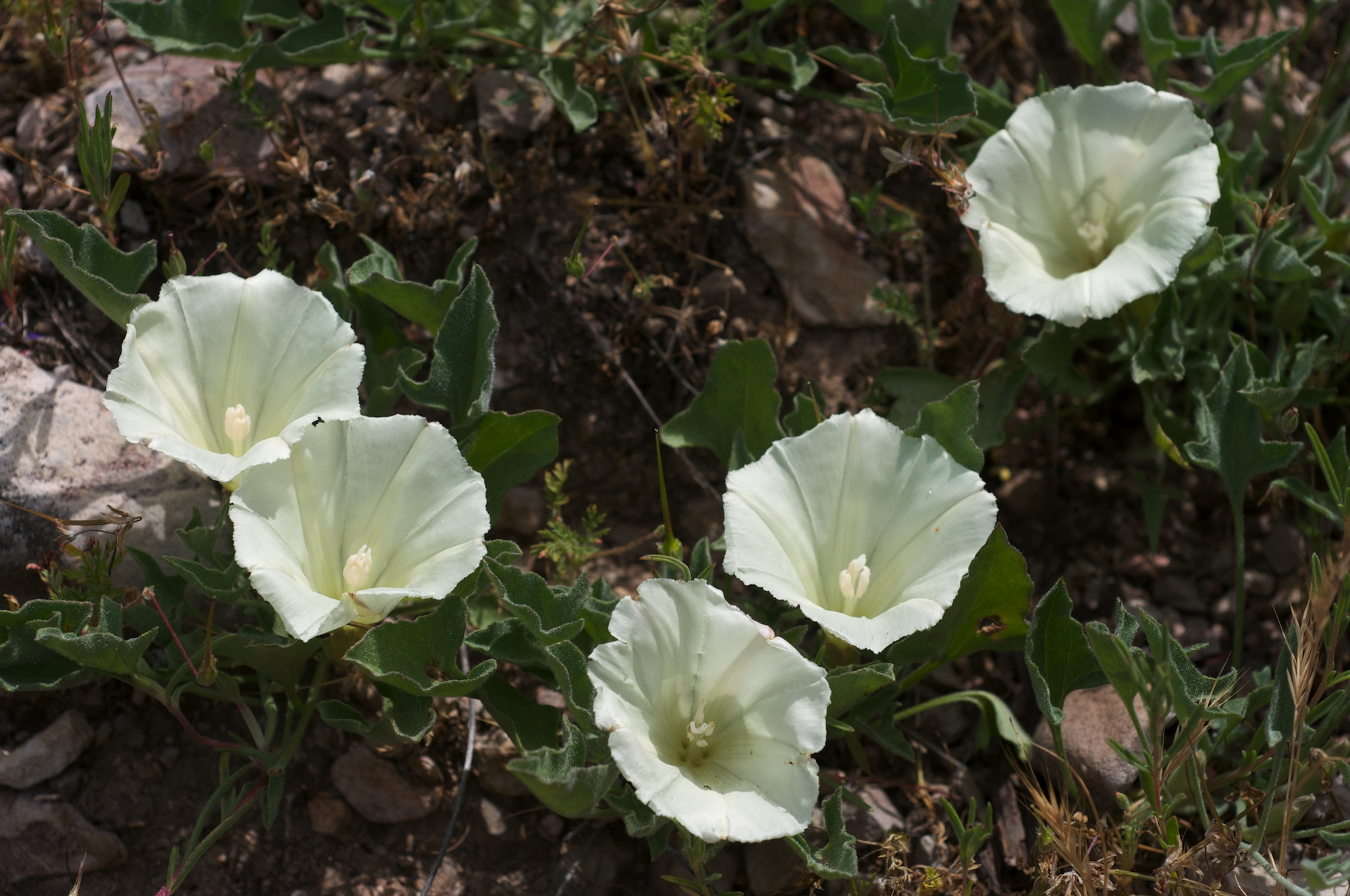

Conservation status
- Vulnerable (NatureServe)

Scientific classification
- Kingdom: Plantae
- Clade: Tracheophytes
- Clade: Angiosperms
- Clade: Eudicots
- Clade: Asterids
- Order: Solanales
- Family: Convolvulaceae
- Genus: Convolvulus
- Species: C. subacaulis

Binomial name
- Convolvulus subacaulis (Hook. & Arn.) Greene

Synonyms
- Calystegia subacaulis Hook. & Arn.

= Convolvulus subacaulis =

Species of morning glory

Convolvulus subacaulis is a species of morning glory known by the common name hillside false bindweed.

It is endemic to California, where it grows in the North and Central California Coast Ranges and the San Francisco Bay Area, in woodland and chaparral scrub habitat.

== Description ==
Convolvulus subacaulis is a hairy perennial herb growing from a woody caudex or a rhizome and extending stems no longer than about 20 centimeters. The leaves are 3 or 4 centimeters long and triangular or arrowhead shaped with small side lobes.

The inflorescence produces morning glory flowers atop short peduncles. Each flower is 3 to 6 centimeters wide and white or cream in color, often tinted with light purple.
