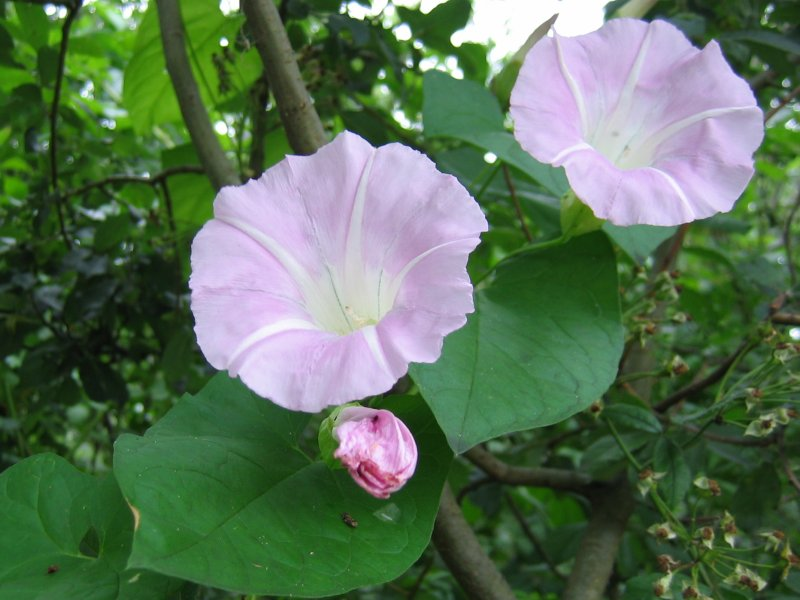

Scientific classification
- Kingdom: Plantae
- Clade: Tracheophytes
- Clade: Angiosperms
- Clade: Eudicots
- Clade: Asterids
- Order: Solanales
- Family: Convolvulaceae
- Genus: Convolvulus
- Species: C. × dubius

Binomial name
- Convolvulus × dubius J.L.Gilbert

Synonyms
- Calystegia × pulchra Brummitt & Heywood

= Convolvulus × dubius =

Species of flowering plant

Convolvulus × dubius, commonly known as hairy bindweed, is a species of morning glory. It is a climbing plant that may exceed three meters in height. The bright pink corolla may be 5 to 7 centimeters and has distinct white stripes. This species is a weedy wildflower which has naturalized in many areas, including much of Europe and is also grown as an ornamental plant.
