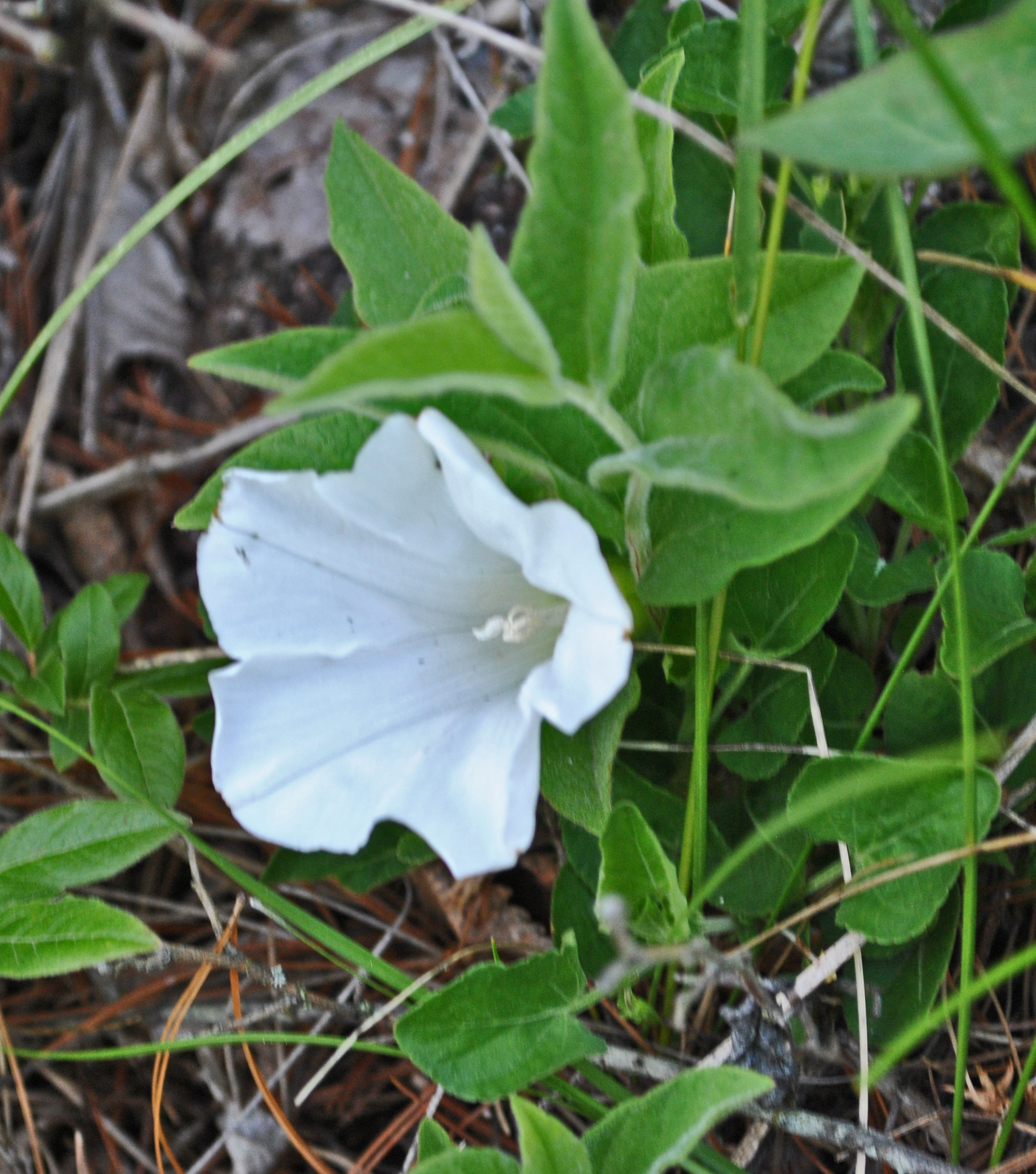

Scientific classification
- Kingdom: Plantae
- Clade: Tracheophytes
- Clade: Angiosperms
- Clade: Eudicots
- Clade: Asterids
- Order: Solanales
- Family: Convolvulaceae
- Genus: Convolvulus
- Species: C. spithamaeus

Binomial name
- Convolvulus spithamaeus L.

Synonyms
- Calystegia spithamaea (L.) Pursh; Volvulus spithamaeus (L.) Farw.; Volvulus spithamineus Kuntze

= Convolvulus spithamaeus =

Species of morning glory

Convolvulus spithamaeus, which common names include: low false bindweed, low bindweed, erect bindweed, and upright bindweed, is a species of flowering plant found in eastern North America.

== Conservation status in the United States ==
It is listed as threatened in Maine and Vermont and endangered in Massachusetts and New Jersey. It is listed as a species of special concern in Connecticut, where it is believed to be extirpated.
