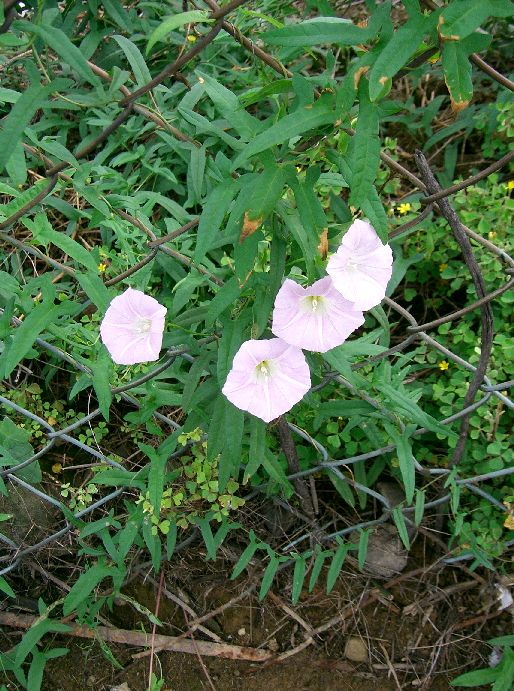

Scientific classification
- Kingdom: Plantae
- Clade: Tracheophytes
- Clade: Angiosperms
- Clade: Eudicots
- Clade: Asterids
- Order: Solanales
- Family: Convolvulaceae
- Genus: Convolvulus
- Species: C. japonicus

Binomial name
- Convolvulus japonicus Thunb.

Synonyms
- List: Calystegia chinensis Baill.; Calystegia japonica (Thunb.) Choisy; Calystegia pubescens Lindl.; Calystegia sepium f. albiflora (Makino) T.Yamaz.; Calystegia sepium f. major Makino; Convolvulus japonicus Thunb.; Convolvulus pellitus f. anestius Fernald; Convolvulus pubescens (Lindl.) Thell.; Ipomoea japonica (Thunb.) Roem. & Schult.; Volvulus japonicus (Thunb.) Farw.; Volvulus pubescens (Lindl.) Voss

= Convolvulus japonicus =

Species of flowering plant

Convolvulus japonicus, commonly known as Japanese bindweed, is a species of bindweed. This is a small climbing plant that grows to 20~70 centimeters in height. The corolla is partially pink and is under 4 cm long. This species is a weedy wildflower distributed in South Korea, Japan, and countries in south-eastern Asia. It is able to be distinguished from other bindweeds by its foliage having divided side lobes.
