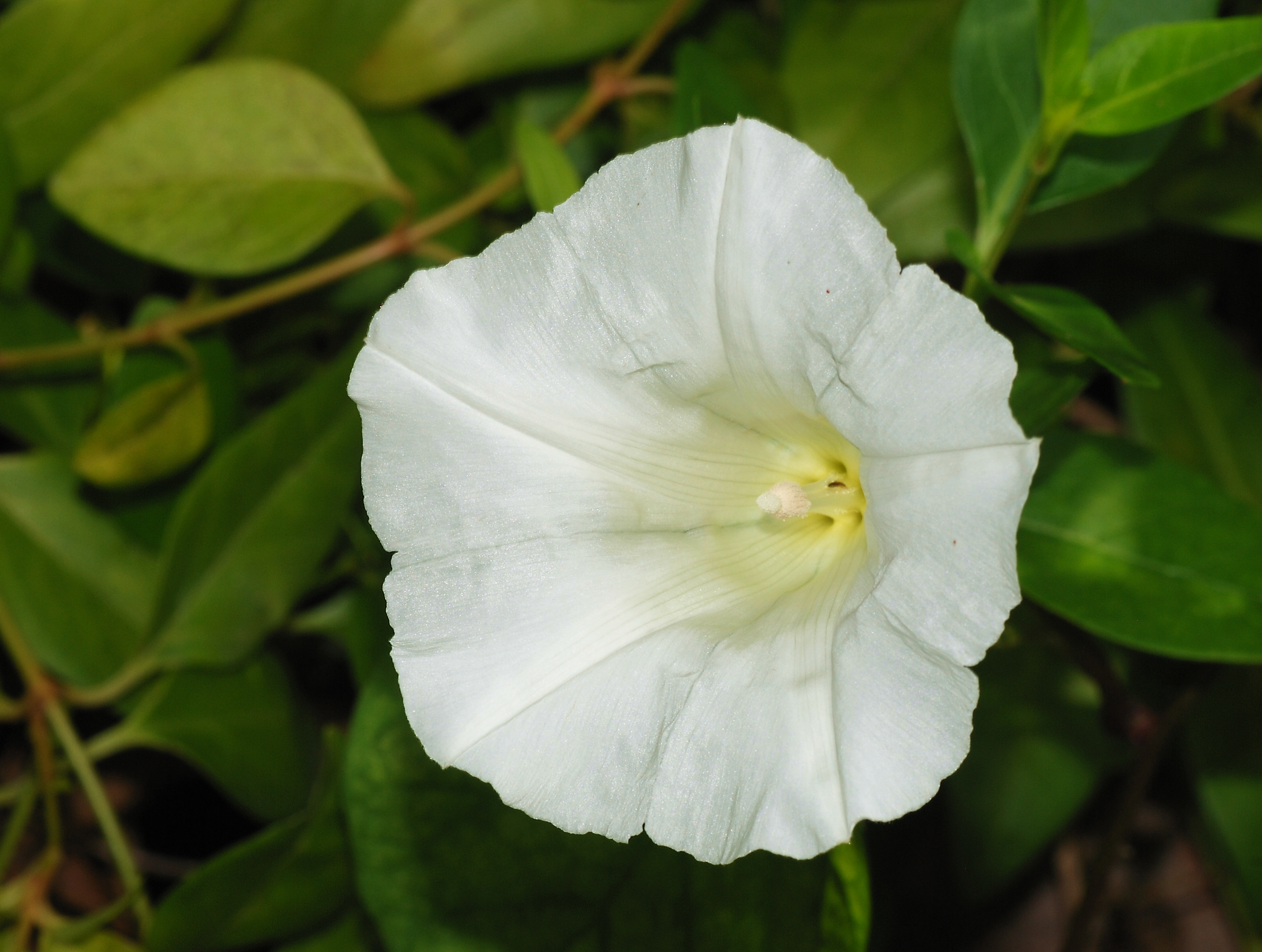
- Flower of Convolvulus sepium

Conservation status
- Least Concern (IUCN 3.1)

Scientific classification
- Kingdom: Plantae
- Clade: Tracheophytes
- Clade: Angiosperms
- Clade: Eudicots
- Clade: Asterids
- Order: Solanales
- Family: Convolvulaceae
- Genus: Convolvulus
- Species: C. sepium

Binomial name
- Convolvulus sepium L.

Synonyms
- Calystegia sepium (L.) R.Br.; Volvulus sepium (L.) Medik.

= Convolvulus sepium =

Species of flowering plant

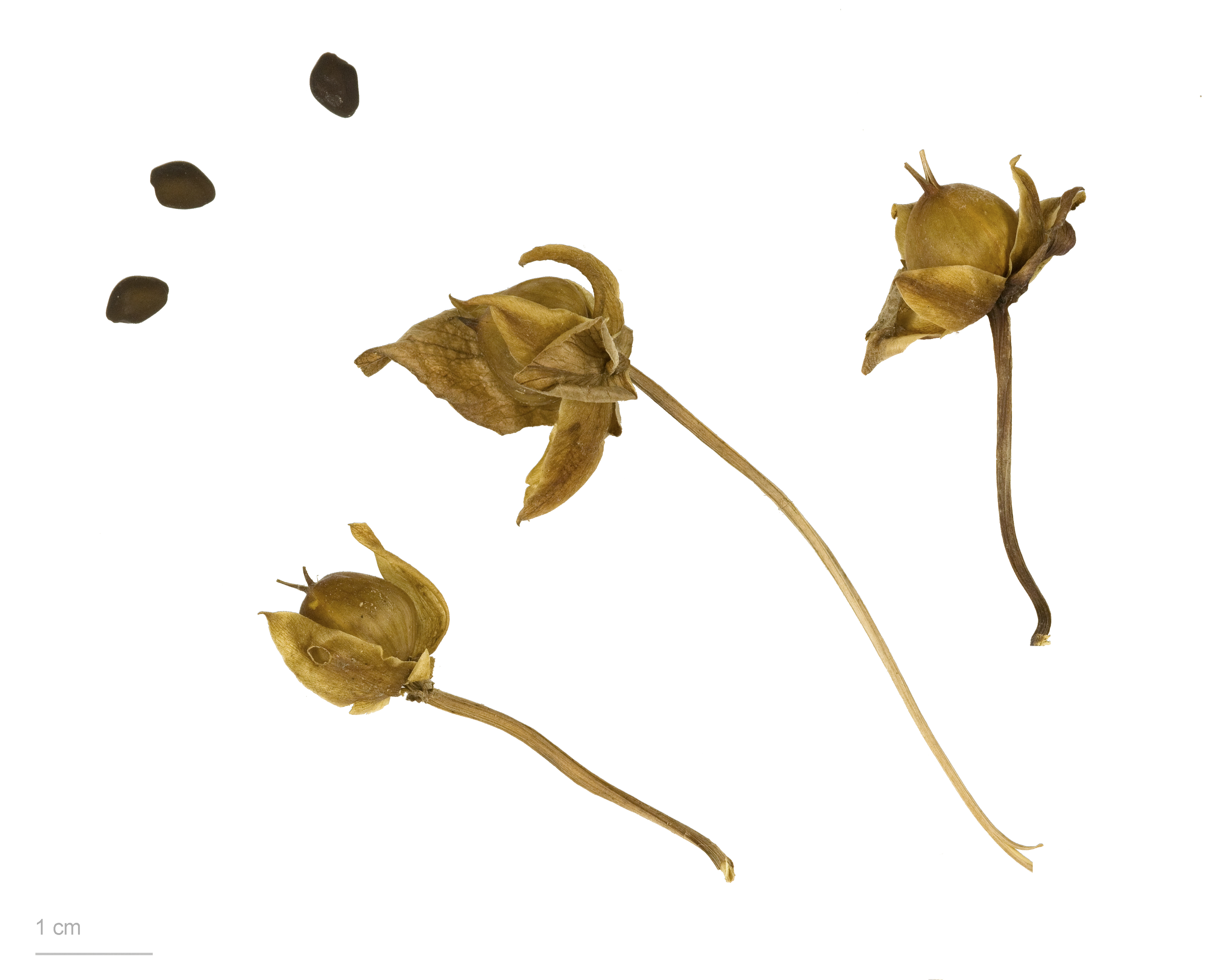
Convolvulus sepium seeds and capsules

Convolvulus sepium or Calystegia sepium (hedge bindweed) is a species of flowering plant in the family Convolvulaceae. It has a subcosmopolitan distribution throughout temperate regions of the North and South hemispheres.

== Description ==
Convolvulus sepium is a perennial herbaceous plant that twines in a counter-clockwise direction to a height of up to 3 m (10 ft). The leaves are arranged alternately on the spiralling stem; they are dull green above and paler below, simple and sagittate (arrowhead shaped), 5–10 cm (2–4 in) long and 3–7 cm (1 1/4–2 3/4 in) broad.

The flowers are white, sometimes tinged pale pink, produced from late spring to the end of summer (between July and September in northern Europe). The buds are enclosed by large (2 cm (3/4 in) long), ovate-lanceolate, green bracteoles with keels and burgundy margins; during anthesis they do not (or scarcely) overlap. The open flowers are trumpet-shaped, 3–7 centimetres (1 1/4–2 3/4 in) diameter. After flowering, the fruit develops as an almost spherical capsule, which is hidden by the bracts. It is 1 centimetre (1/2 in) in diameter, containing two to four large, dark brown, or black seeds that are shaped like quartered oranges.

The plant thrives in hedges, fields, borders, beside water, on roadsides and woodland edges.

== Identification ==
There are several species of Convolvulus which occur in similar habitats and can be difficult to distinguish, especially when not in flower. C. sepium, C. silvatica and C. pulchra are sometimes recorded as an aggregate, as "C. sepium agg.", whenever identification is uncertain. The use of this term can sometimes create confusion about which taxon is being discussed.

The best way to separate Convolvulus sepium from the other taxa is by the bracteoles, which subtend the flower and wholly or partially encompass the sepals. Convolvulus sepium has two rather long, narrow bracteoles which do not touch each other, whereas both large bindweed (Convolvulus silvaticus) and hairy bindweed (Convolvulus × dubius) have shorter, wider bracteoles which overlap where they meet.

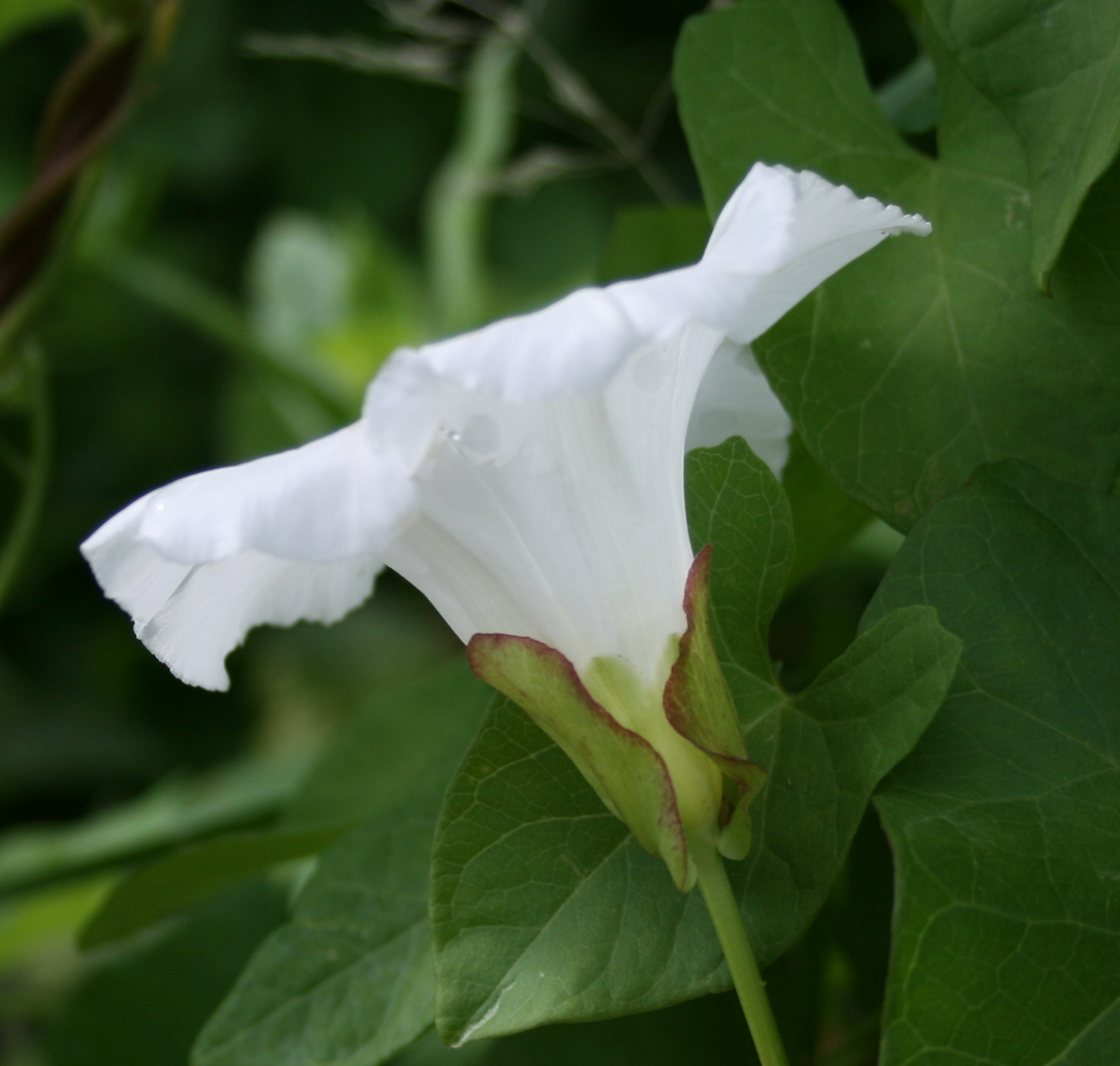
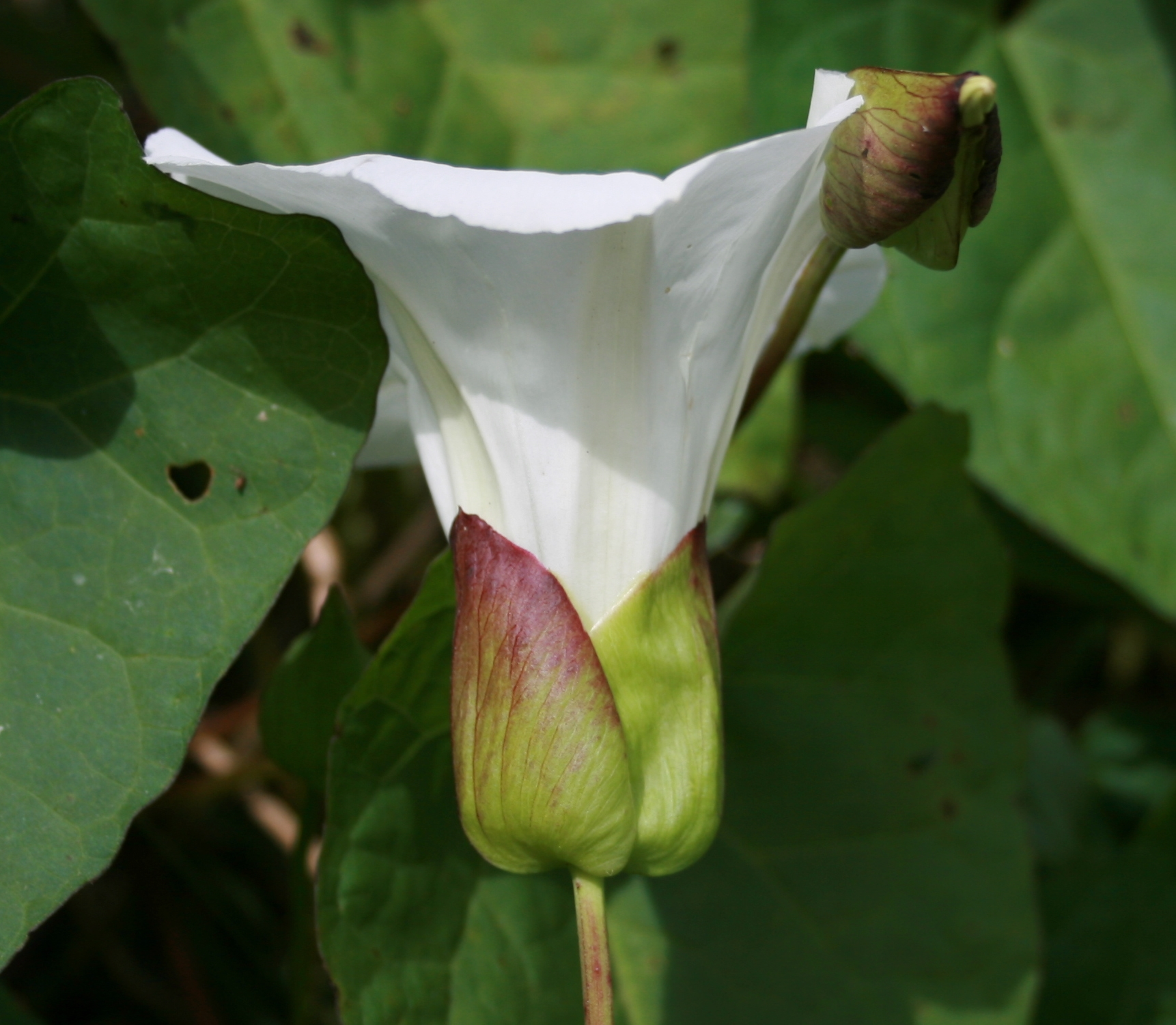
Bracteoles of Convolvulus sepium (left) and C. silvaticus (right)

== Taxonomy ==
In research published in 2025, the genus Calystegia was found to be nested within the earlier-named genus Convolvulus, and its species are now being merged into that genus; this species thus becomes Convolvulus sepium L.

Eight subspecies are accepted:

- Convolvulus sepium subsp. americanus. North America.
- Convolvulus sepium subsp. angulatus. North America.
- Convolvulus sepium subsp. appalachianum. Eastern North America.
- Convolvulus sepium subsp. erraticus. North America.
- Convolvulus sepium subsp. balticus. Northern Europe.
- Convolvulus sepium subsp. roseatus. Western Europe, coasts. Flowers pink.
- Convolvulus sepium subsp. sepium. Europe, Asia.
- Convolvulus sepium subsp. spectabilis. Siberia. Flowers often pinkish.

== Phytochemistry ==
Convolvulus sepium is toxic, containing calystegine alkaloids.

== Vernacular names ==
Apart from hedge bindweed, other vernacular names include greater bindweed, bearbind, hedge convolvulus, hooded bindweed, old man's nightcap, wild morning glory, bride's gown, wedlock (referring to the white gown-like flowers and the binding nature of the vine), white witches hat, belle of the ball, devil's guts and hedgebell.

== Similar species ==
- Convolvulus silvaticus, giant bindweed, is sometimes treated as a subspecies of C. sepium
- Convolvulus arvensis, field bindweed, is a similar vine with much smaller features. The rear margin leaf projections are sharp.
- The leaves of Ipomoea pandurata, wild potato vine, are shaped like a heart, not like an arrowhead.

== Gallery ==
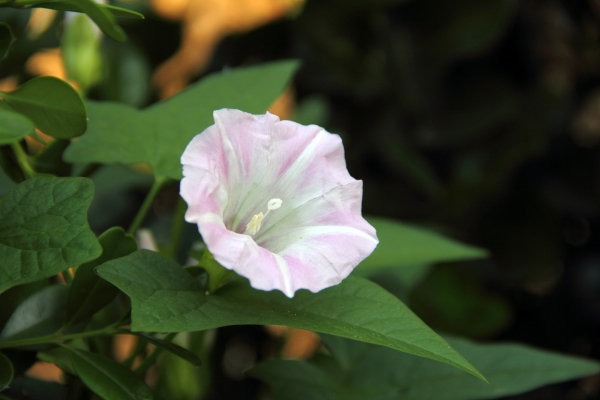

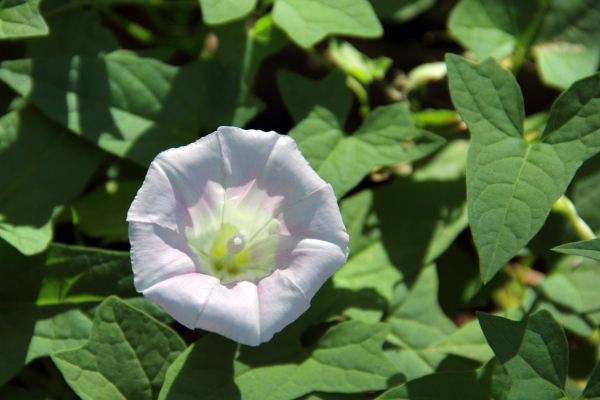

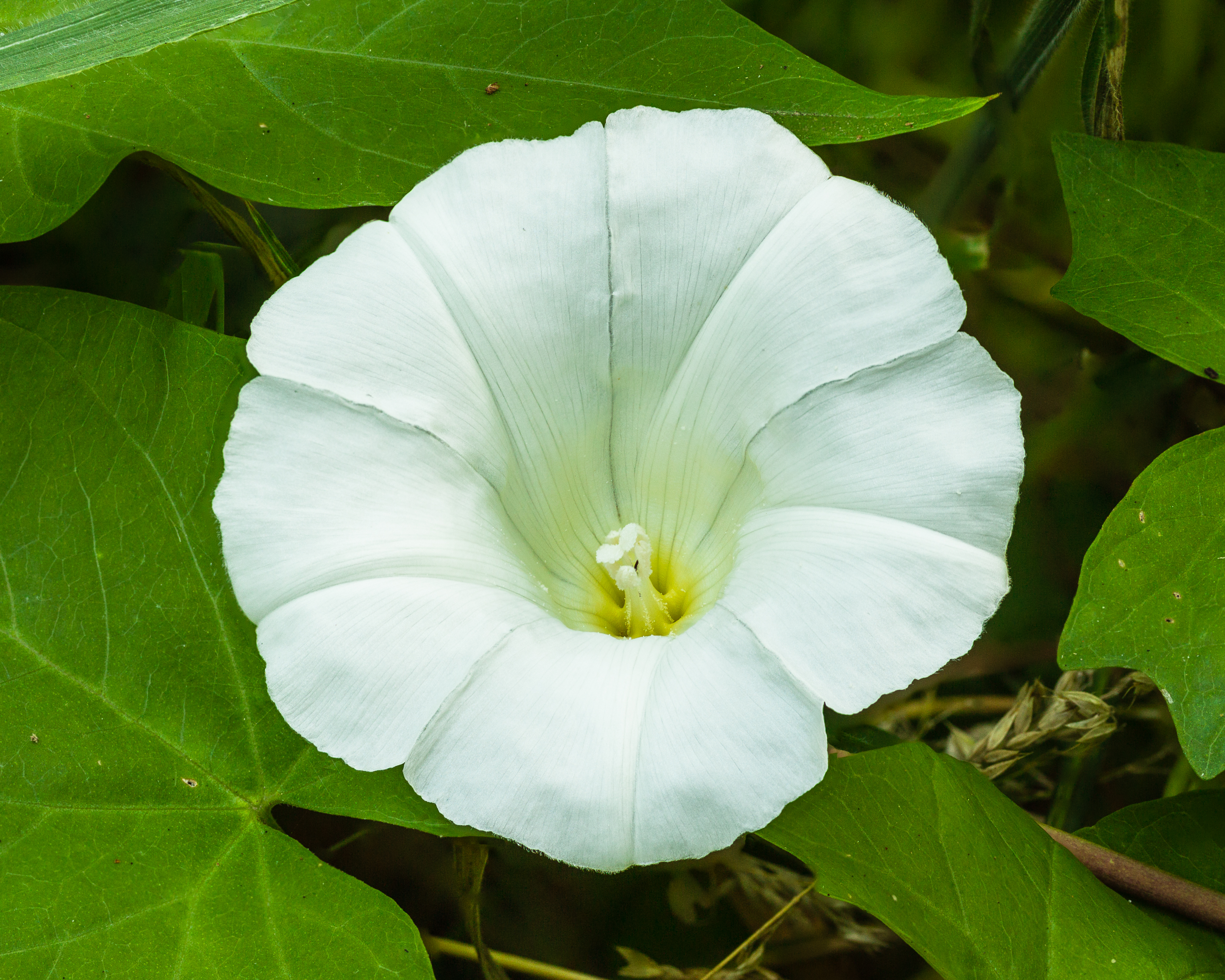
Flower of a Convolvulus sepium
