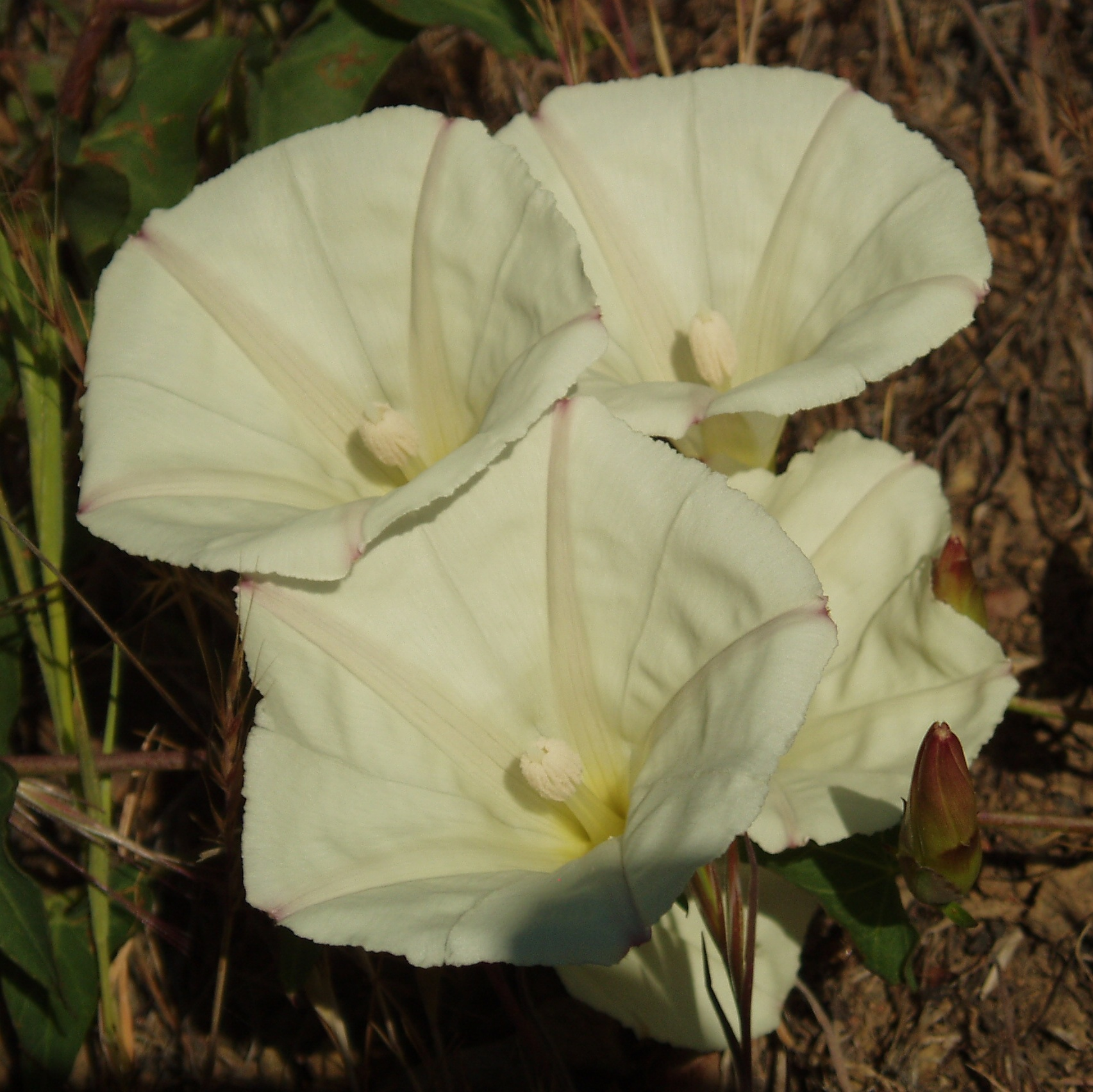

Scientific classification
- Kingdom: Plantae
- Clade: Tracheophytes
- Clade: Angiosperms
- Clade: Eudicots
- Clade: Asterids
- Order: Solanales
- Family: Convolvulaceae
- Genus: Convolvulus
- Species: C. occidentalis

Binomial name
- Convolvulus occidentalis A.Gray

Synonyms
- Calystegia occidentalis (A.Gray) Brummitt

= Convolvulus occidentalis =

Species of morning glory

Convolvulus occidentalis is a species of morning glory known by the common names Modoc morning glory or chaparral false bindweed.

It is native to California and Oregon, where it grows in hilly and mountain habitat, such as woodland and chaparral slopes and the high Sierra Nevada.

== Description ==
Convolvulus occidentalis is a woody perennial herb producing spreading or twisting and climbing branches, usually quite hairy in texture. The small leaves are up to 4 centimeters long and lobed into various spade or arrowhead shapes.

The inflorescence is one to four flowers atop a single peduncle, each bloom 2 to 5 centimeters wide and white to cream to yellow in color.
