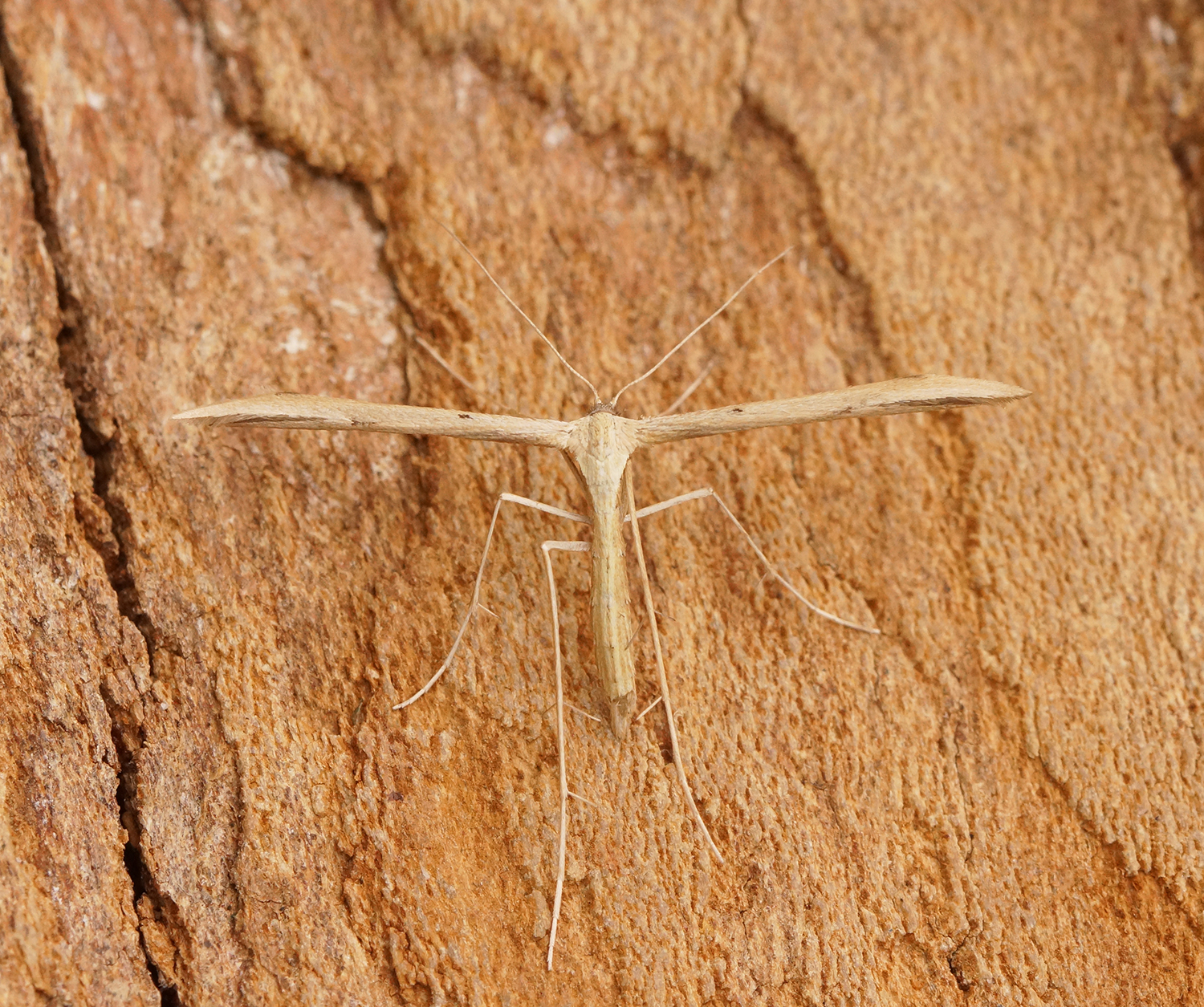

Scientific classification
- Domain: Eukaryota
- Kingdom: Animalia
- Phylum: Arthropoda
- Class: Insecta
- Order: Lepidoptera
- Family: Pterophoridae
- Genus: Emmelina
- Species: E. argoteles

Binomial name
- Emmelina argoteles (Meyrick, 1922)

Synonyms
- List: Pterophorus argoteles Meyrick, 1922; Pterophorus jezonicus Matsumura, 1931; Pterophorus komabensis Matsumura, 1931; Pterophorus menoko Matsumura, 1931; Pterophorus yanagawanus Matsumura, 1931; Emmelina jezonica pseudojezonica Derra, 1987; Emmelina pseudojezonica

= Emmelina argoteles =

Species of plume moth

Emmelina argoteles (also known as the reed-bed plume) is a moth of the family Pterophoridae found in Asia and Europe. It was first described by Edward Meyrick in 1922.

== Description ==
The wingspan is about 17 mm. Externally, it is indistinguishable from Emmelina monodactyla.

The larvae feed on hedge bindweed (Calystegia sepium), Calystegia sodanella, Japanese bindweed (Calystegia japonica), bindweed (Convolvulus species) and sweet potato (Ipomoea batatas).

== Distribution ==
It is found in southern and central Europe, through Russia to India, China, Korea and Japan. It was discovered at Wicken Fen, Great Britain in 2005.
