= Silverbush =

Silverbush or Silver bush may refer to various flowering plants with a silvery appearance including:

- Argythamnia
- Convolvulus cneorum
- Sophora tomentosa subsp. australis
