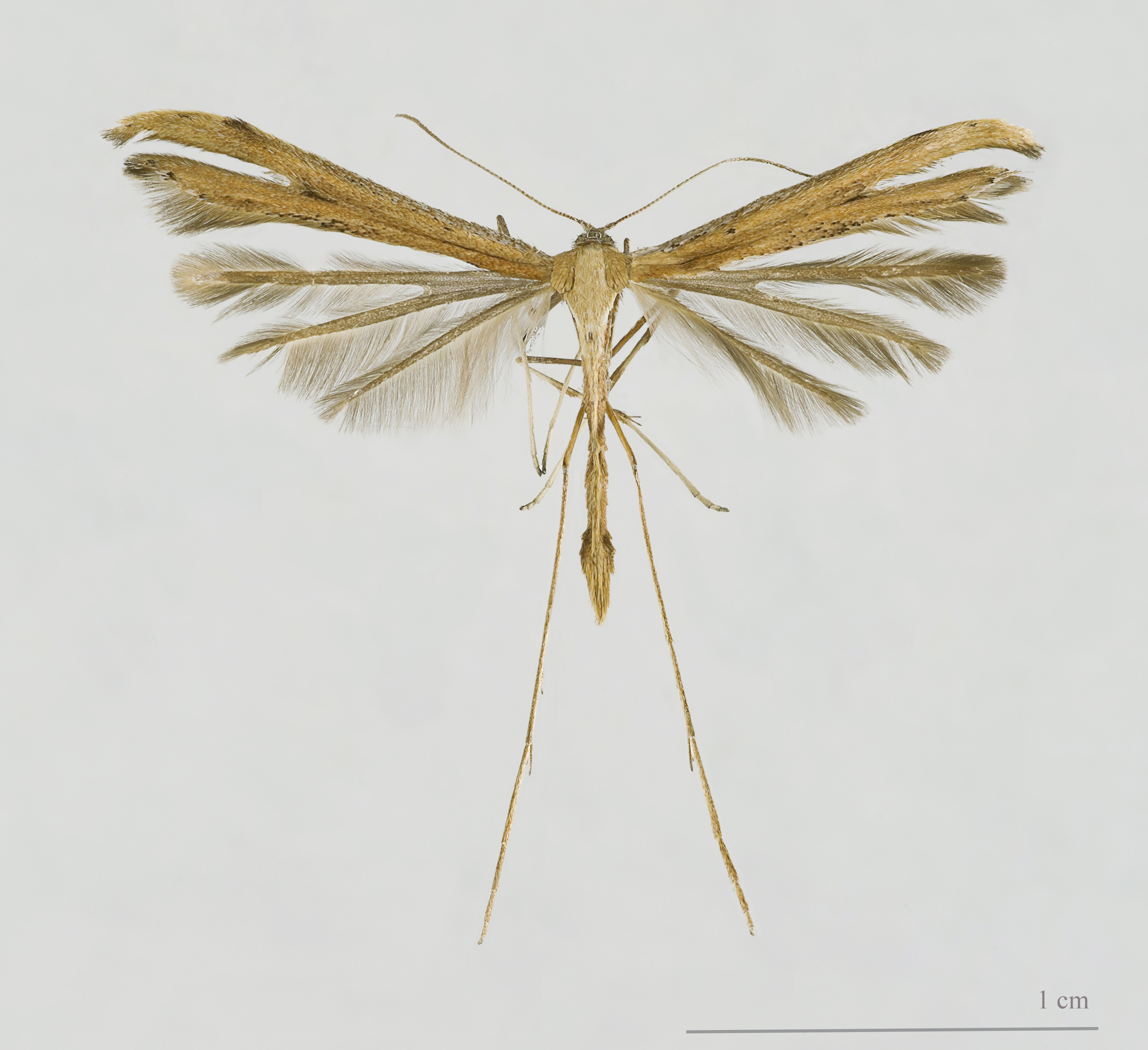

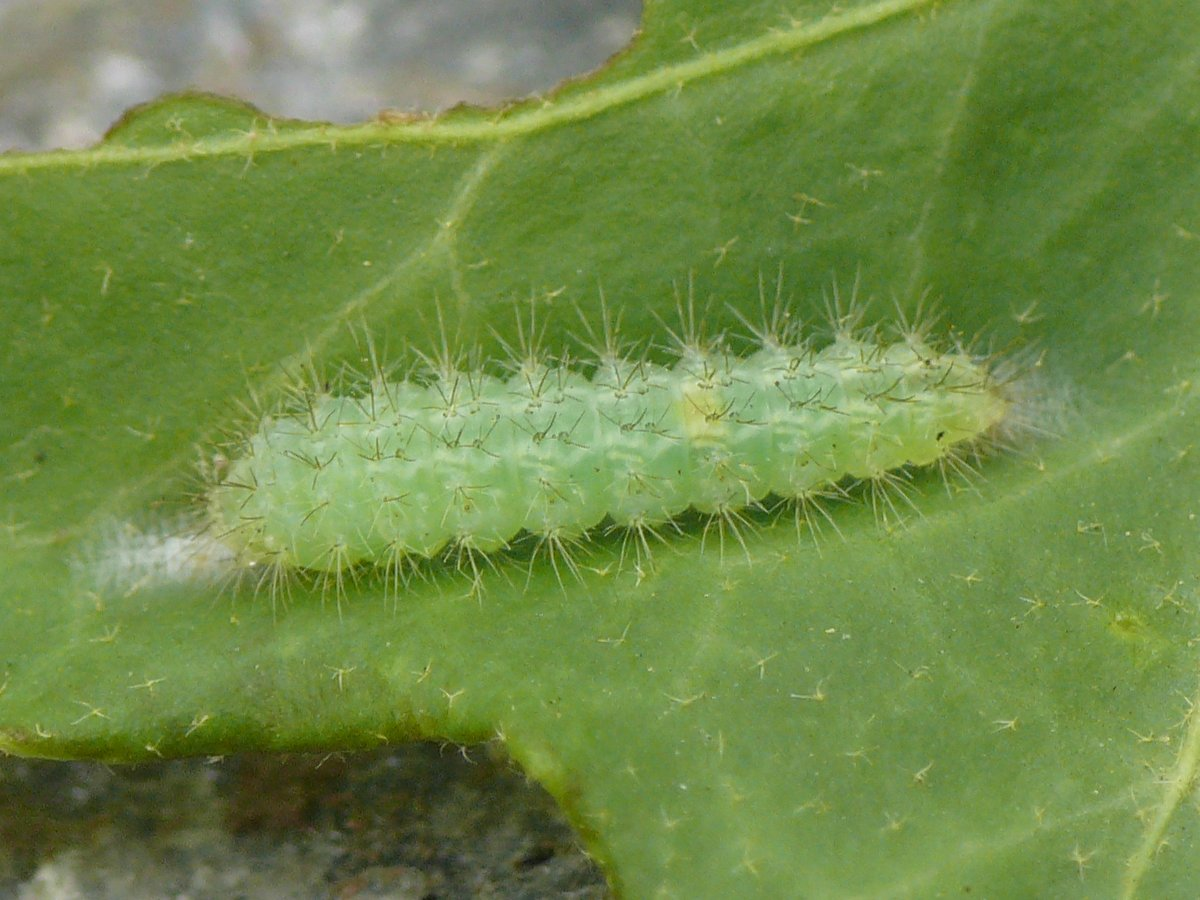

Scientific classification
- Kingdom: Animalia
- Phylum: Arthropoda
- Class: Insecta
- Order: Lepidoptera
- Family: Pterophoridae
- Genus: Emmelina
- Species: E. monodactyla

Binomial name
- Emmelina monodactyla Linnaeus, 1758)

Synonyms
- List: Phalaena Alucita monodactyla Linnaeus, 1758; Phalaena bidactyla Hochenwarth, 1785; Alucita pterodactyla Hübner, 1805; Pterophorus flaveodactylus Amary, 1840; Pterophorus cineridactylus Fitch, 1855; Pterophorus naevosidactylus Fitch, 1855; Pterophorus impersonalis Walker, 1864; Pterophorus pergracilidactylus Packard, 1873; Pterophorus barberi Dyar, 1903; Pterophorus pictipennis Grinnell, 1908; Pterophorus monodactylus f. rufa Dufrane, 1960

= Emmelina monodactyla =

Species of plume moth

Emmelina monodactyla, commonly known as the Common plume or Morning-glory plume, is a moth of the family Pterophoridae found in Africa, Asia, Europe, and North America. It was first described by Carl Linnaeus in 1758.

== Description ==
The moths fly nearly year-round. They are pale russet in colour, with a wingspan of 18–27 millimeters. The colouration is extremely variable, ranging from off-white with indistinct markings to a strong rust brown. The markings may vary considerably in size. The second and third segments are elongate. The caterpillars are greenish-yellow with a broad green band on the back, and a narrow broken yellow line running down the center. Some specimens may also have a wine-red marking on the back. The colour of the pupae may range from green to reddish brown, sometimes with black markings.

The moth often rests with its wings collapsed together tightly.

The common name "Morning glory plume" refers to its association with Ipomoea.

== Biology ==
The larvae feed from May to September in two overlapping generations. They mainly feed on Convolvulaceae species, including hedge bindweed (Calystegia sepium), low false bindweed (Calystegia spithamaea), sea bindweed (Calystegia soldanella), field bindweed (Convolvulus arvensis), Cantabrican morning glory (Convolvulus cantabrica), Convolvulus floridus, Convolvulus prostratus, dwarf morning-glory (Convolvulus tricolor), sweet potato (Ipomoea batatas), Ipomoea eriocarpa and common morning-glory (Ipomoea purpurea). They also feed on Atriplex species, including common orache (Atriplex patula) and Chenopodium, including fat-hen (Chenopodium album) from the family Amaranthaceae, cardoon (Cynara cardunculus) from the family Asteraceae, and thorn apple (Datura stramonium) and henbane (Hyoscyamus niger) from the family Solanaceae.

== Gallery ==
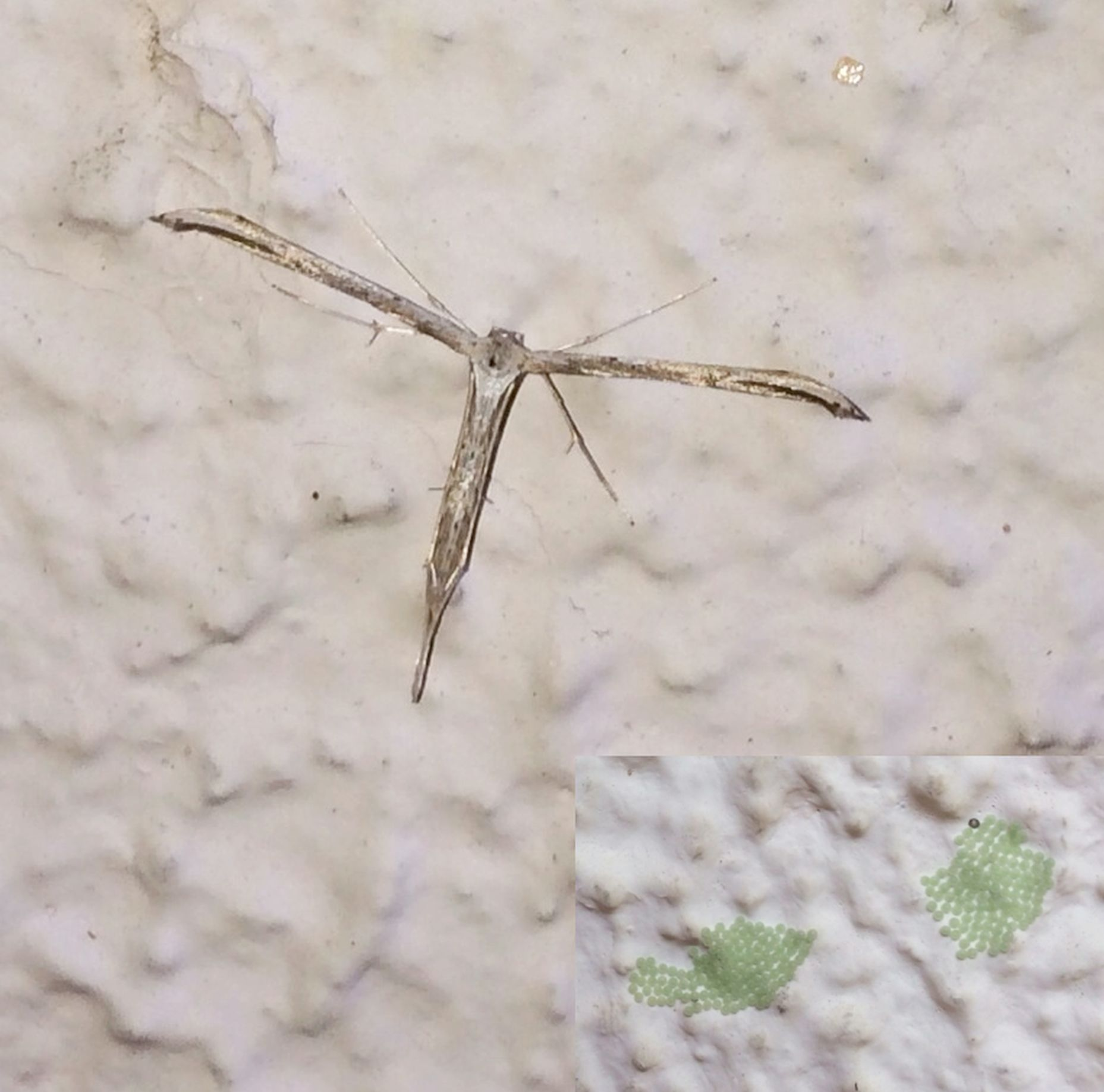
Emmelina and eggs

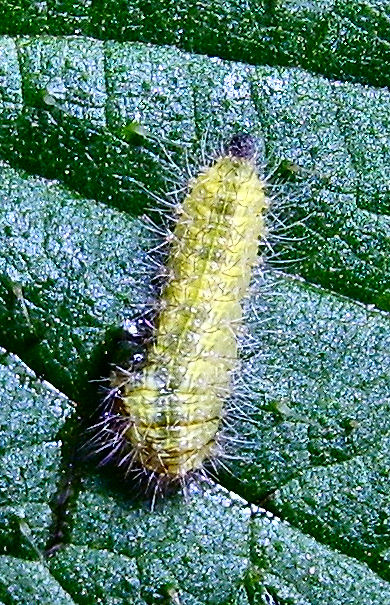
Caterpillar

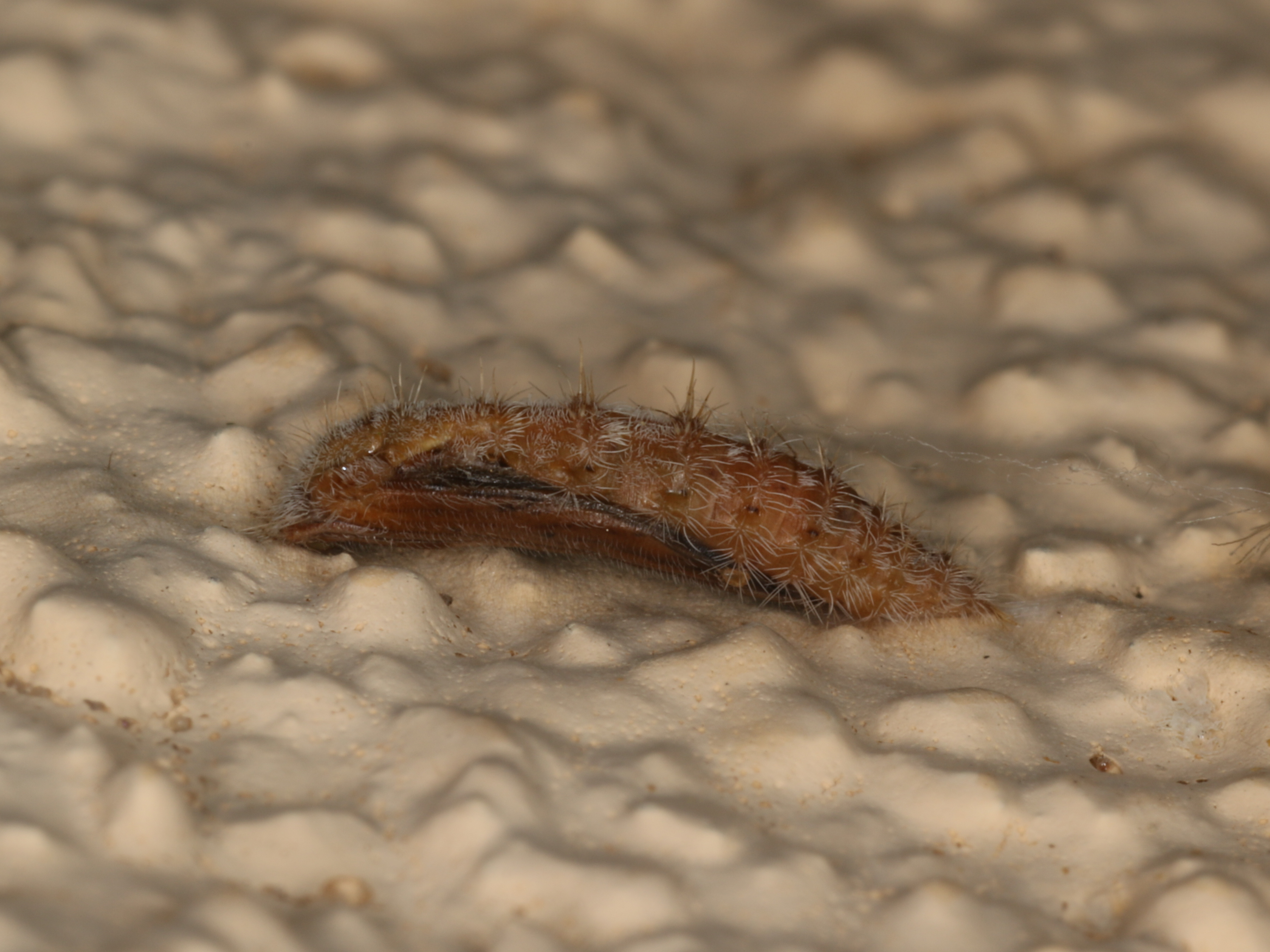
Pupa

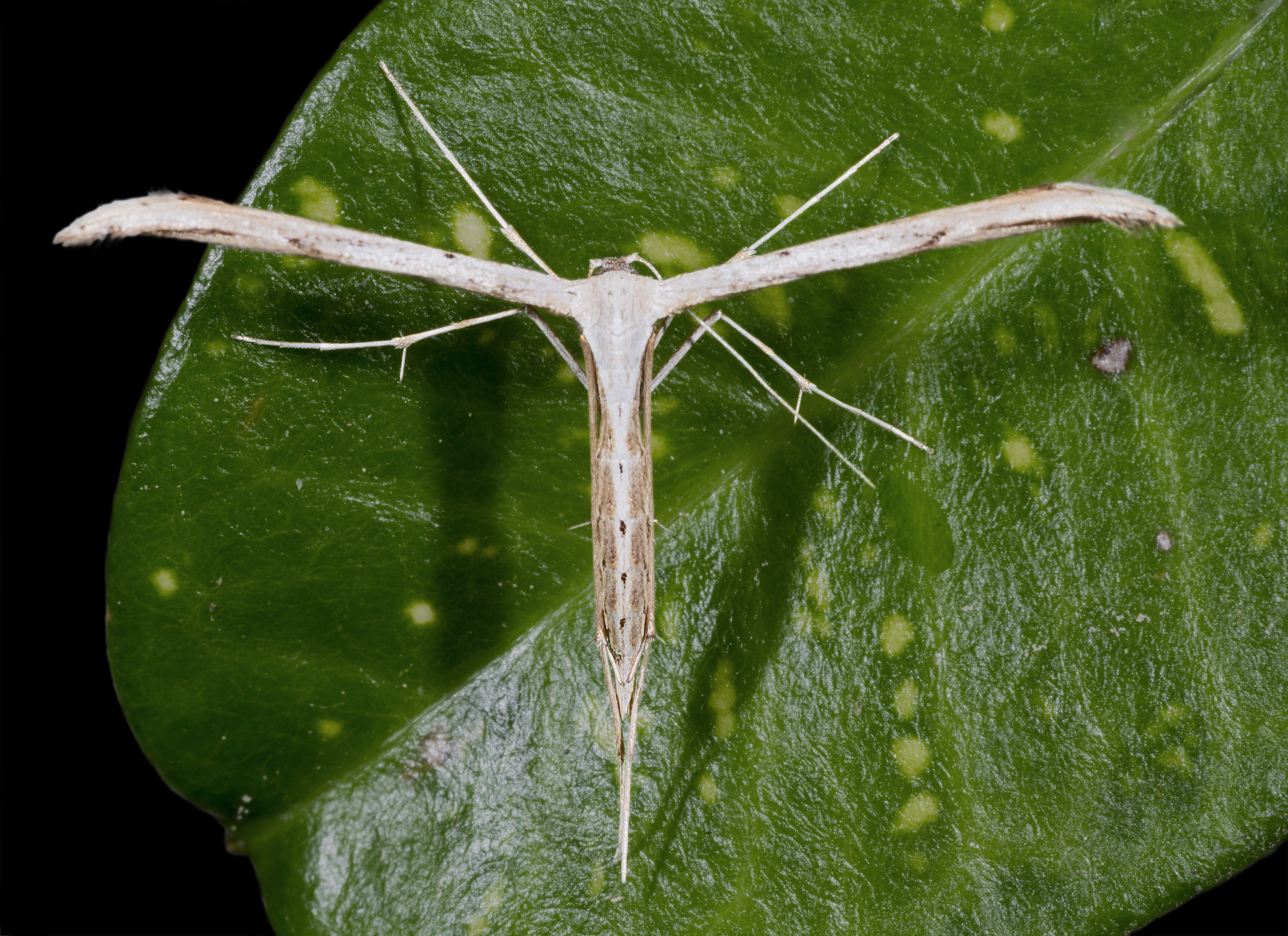
Adult at rest

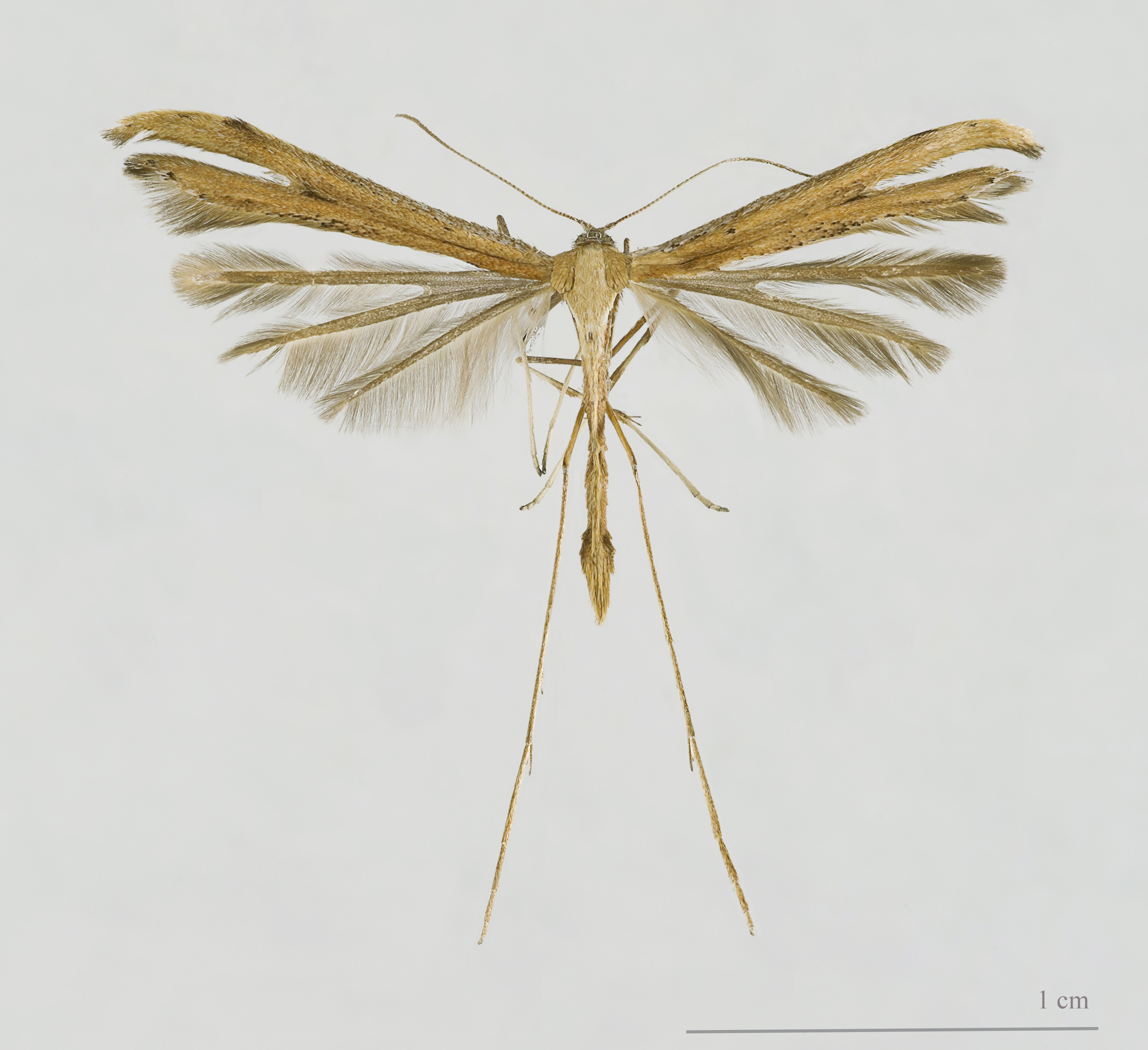

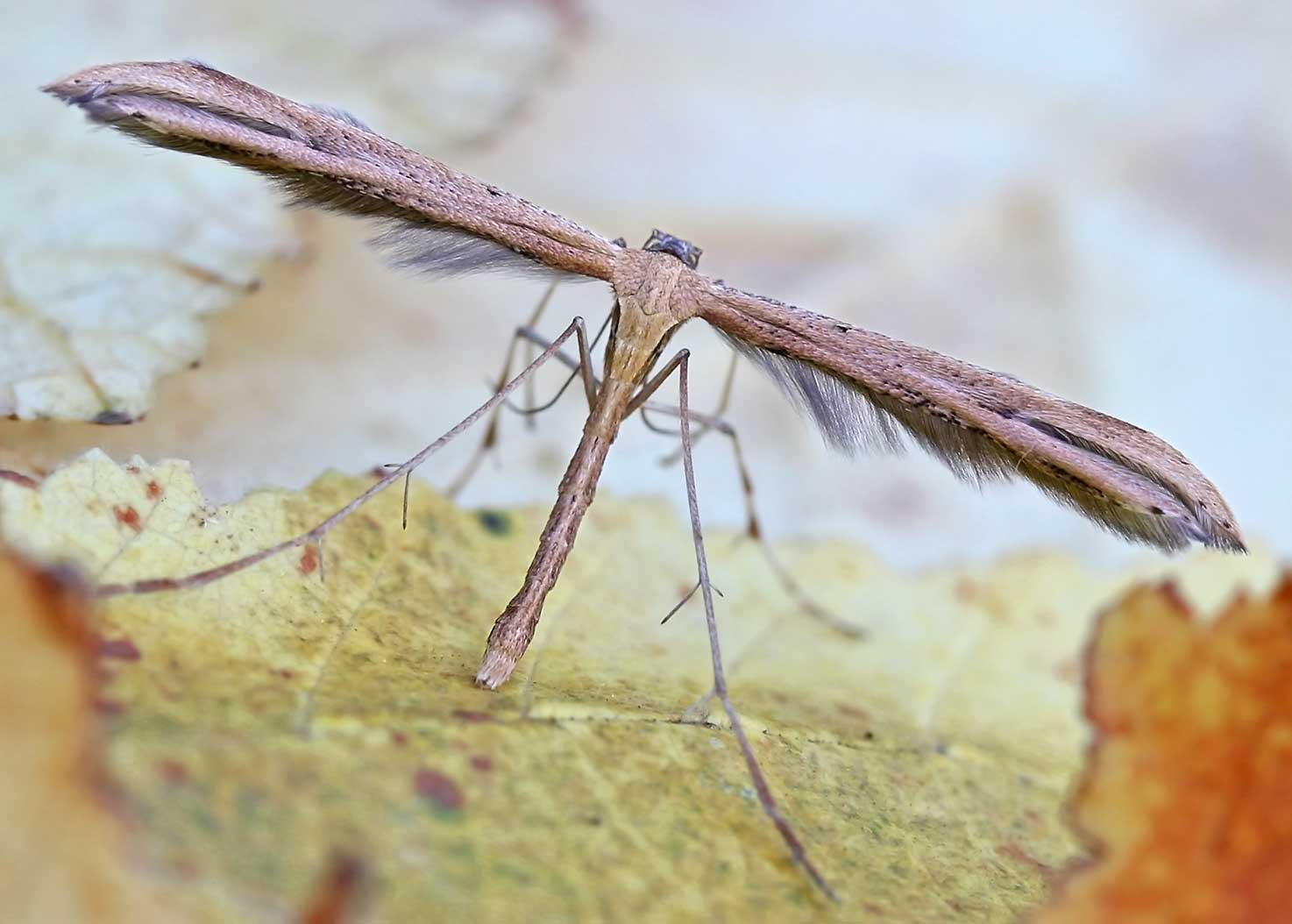

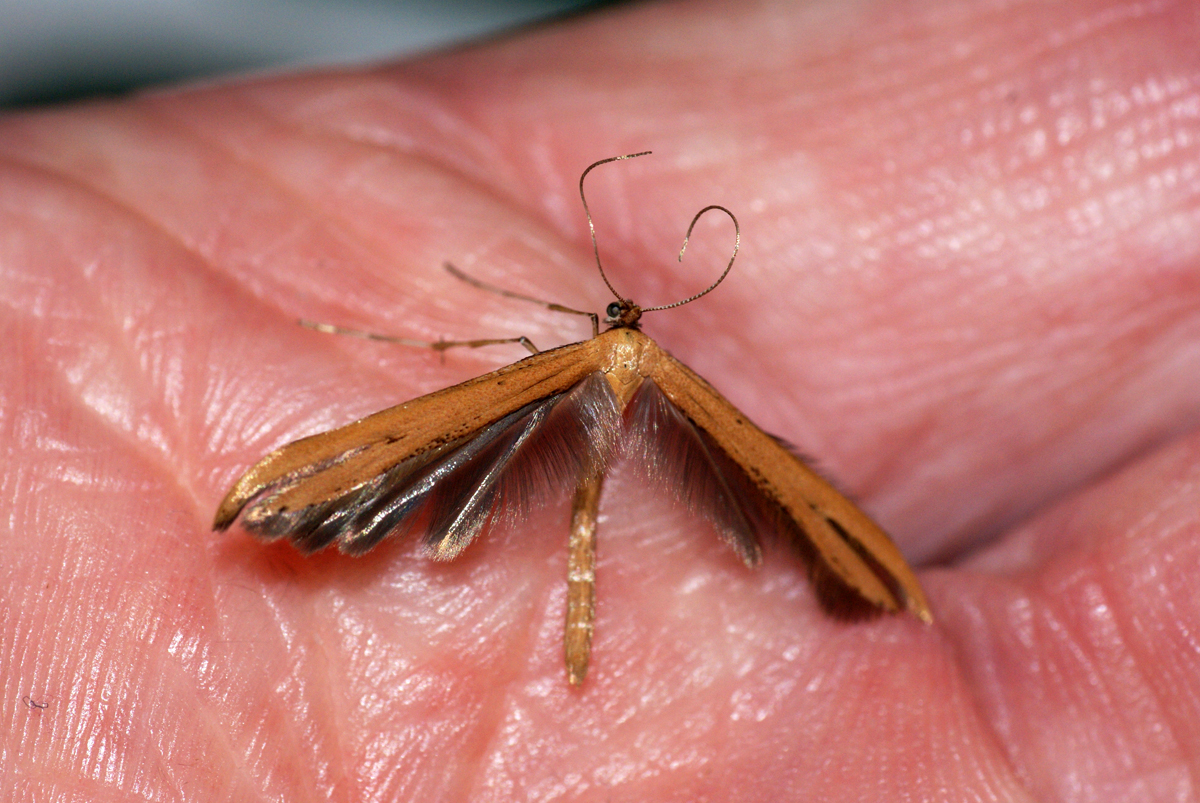

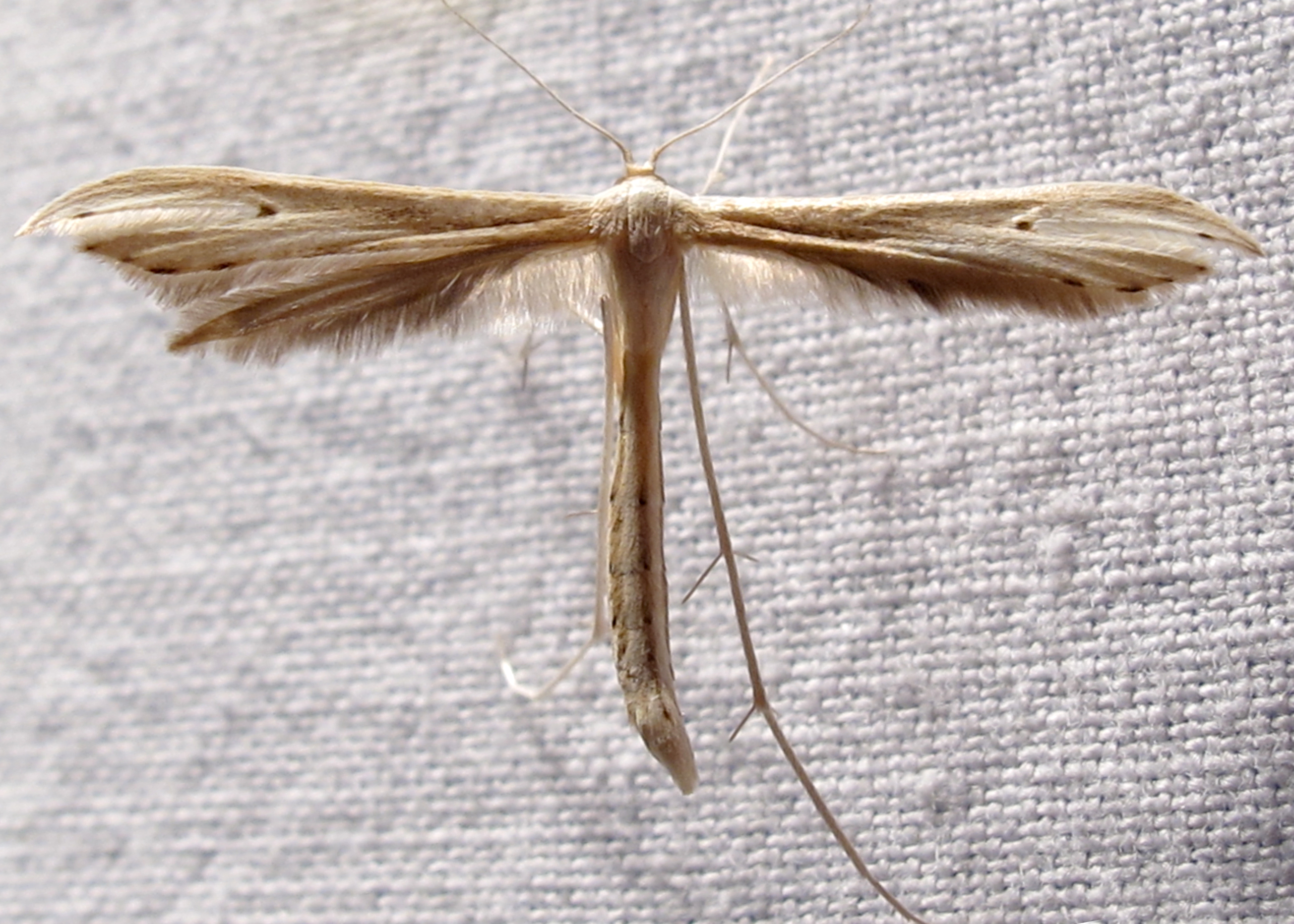

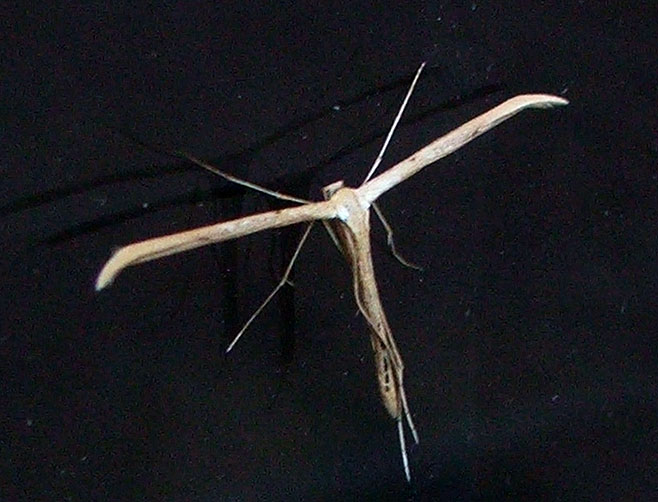

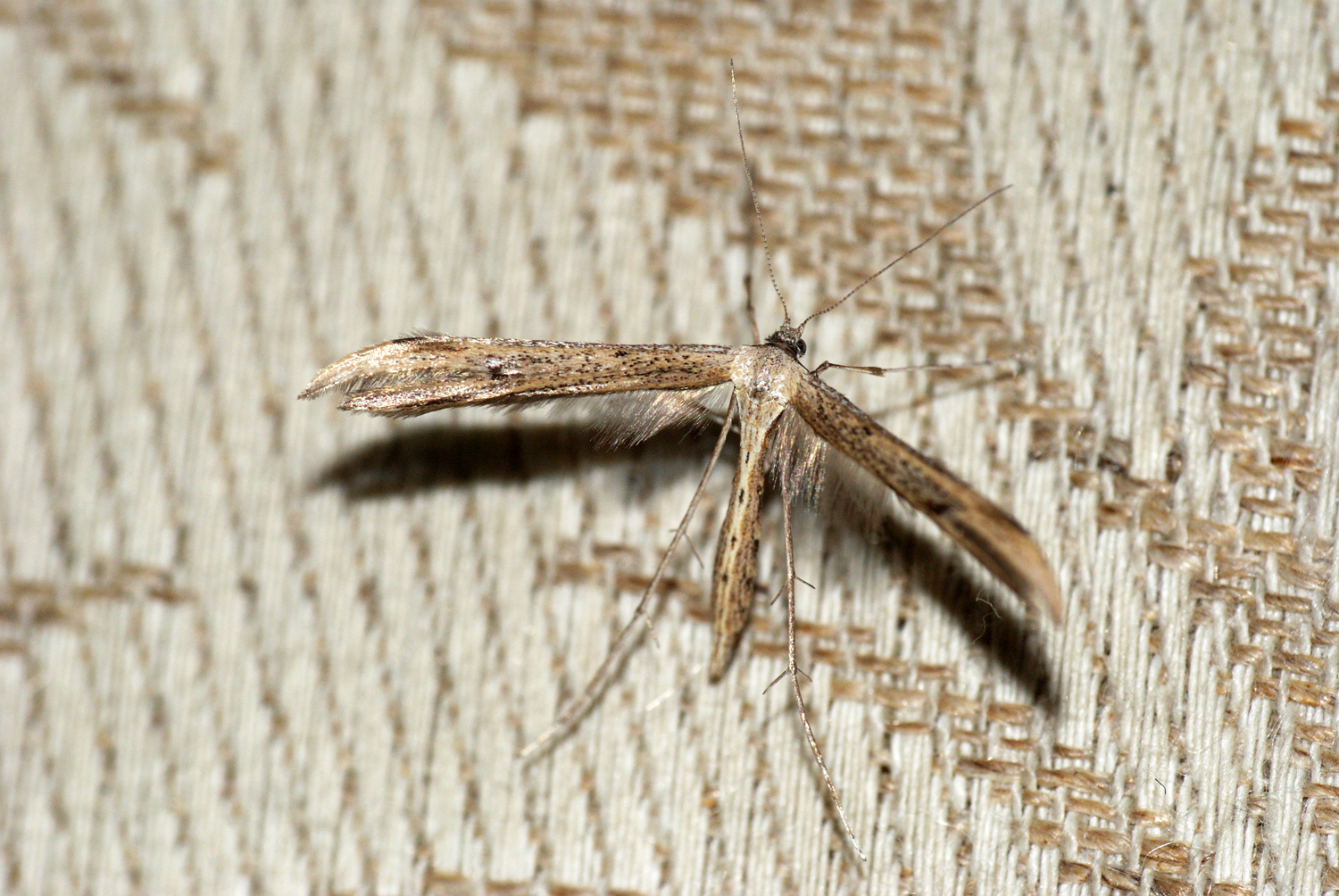

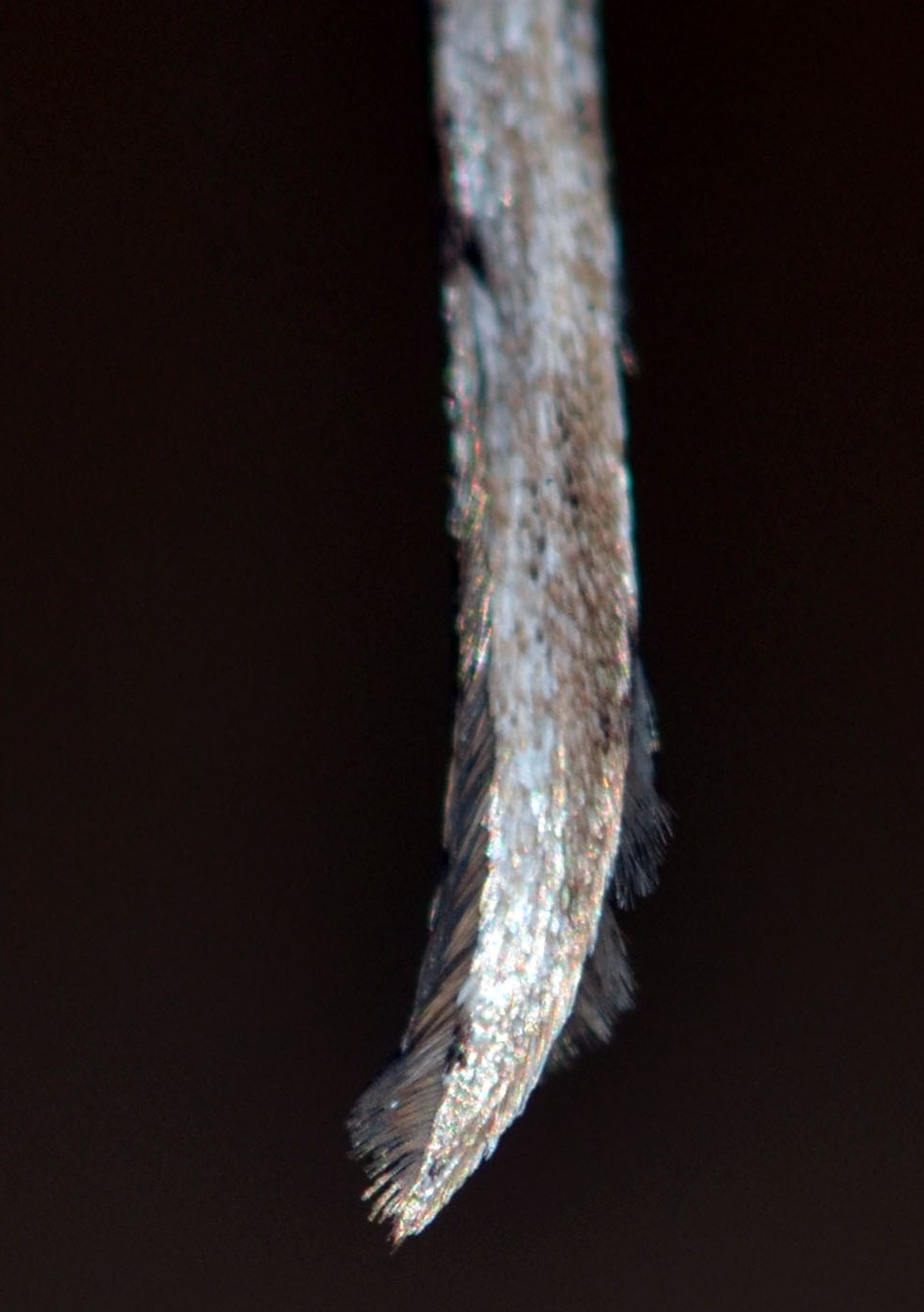

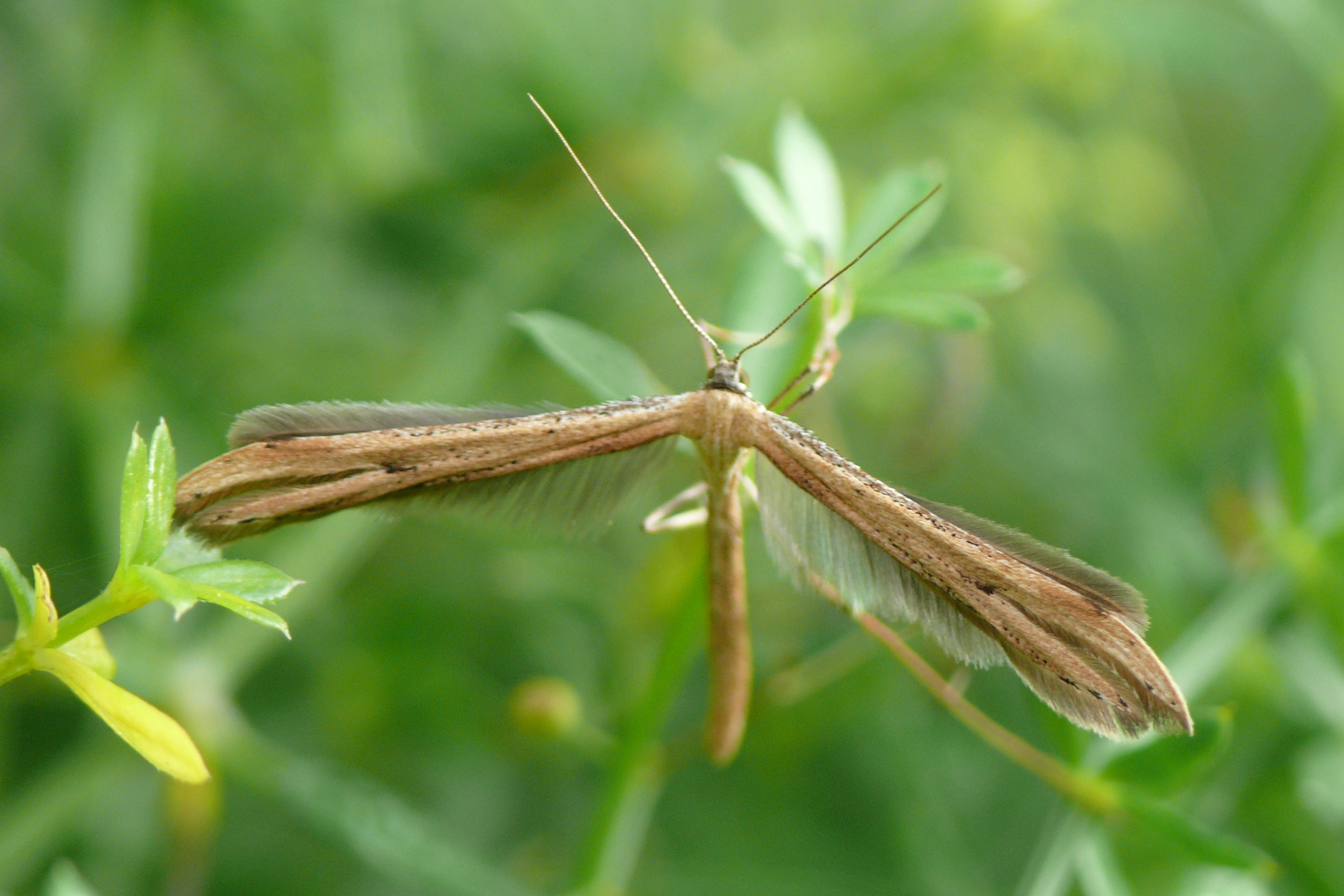

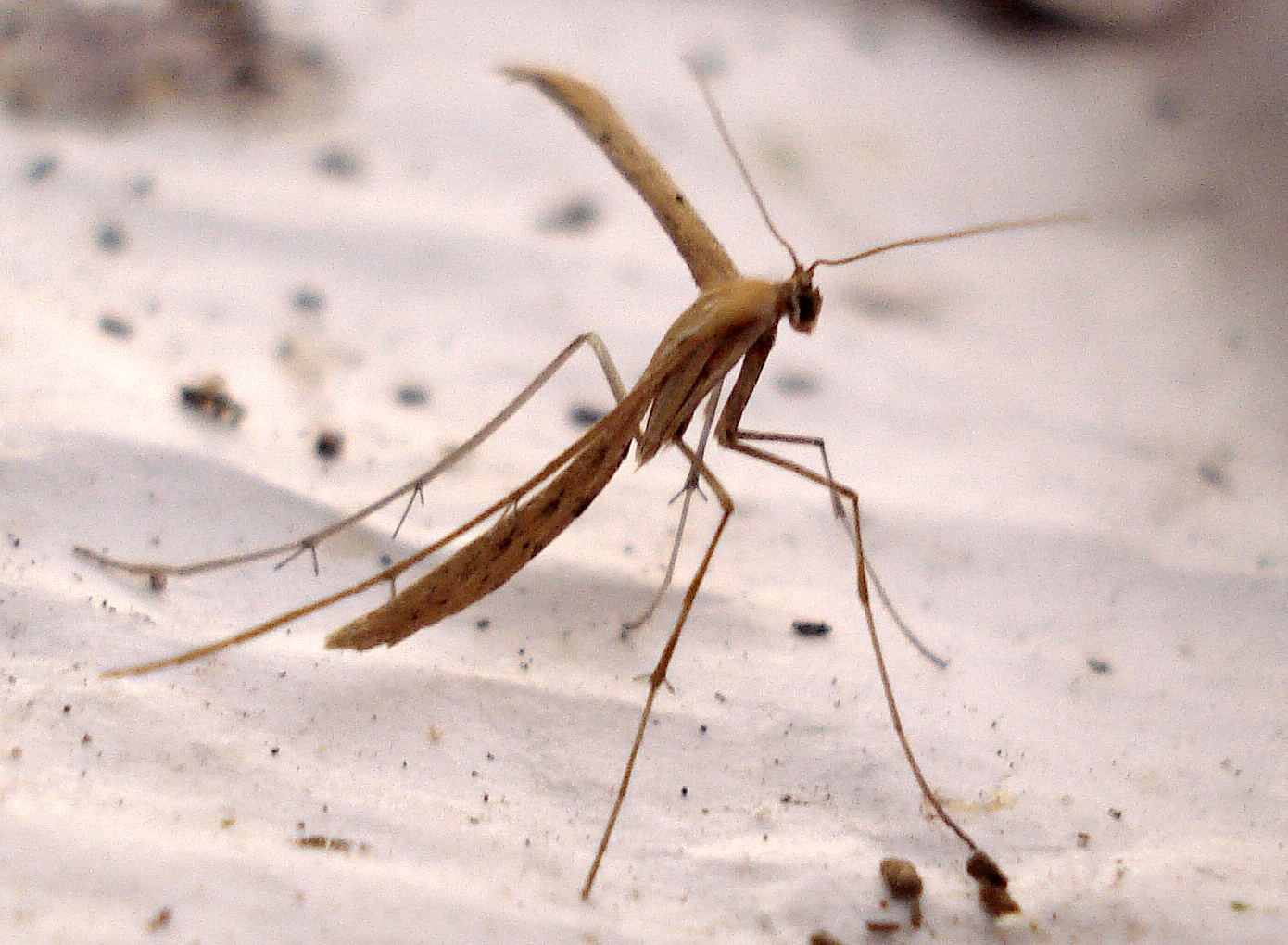

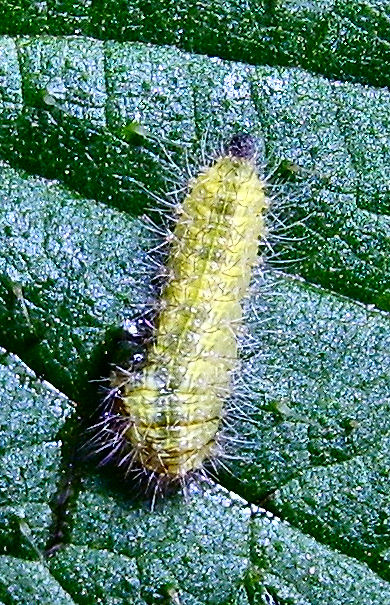

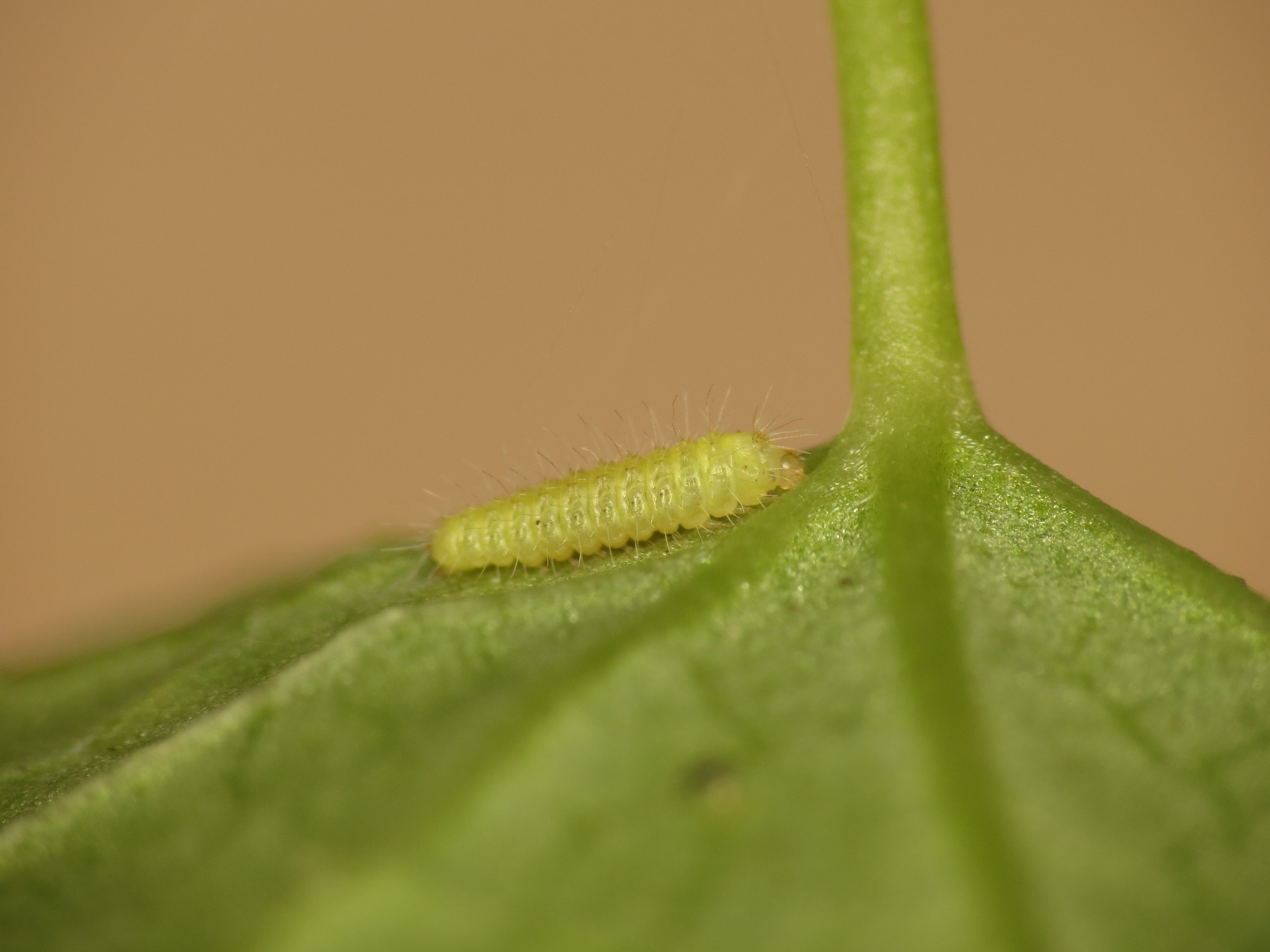

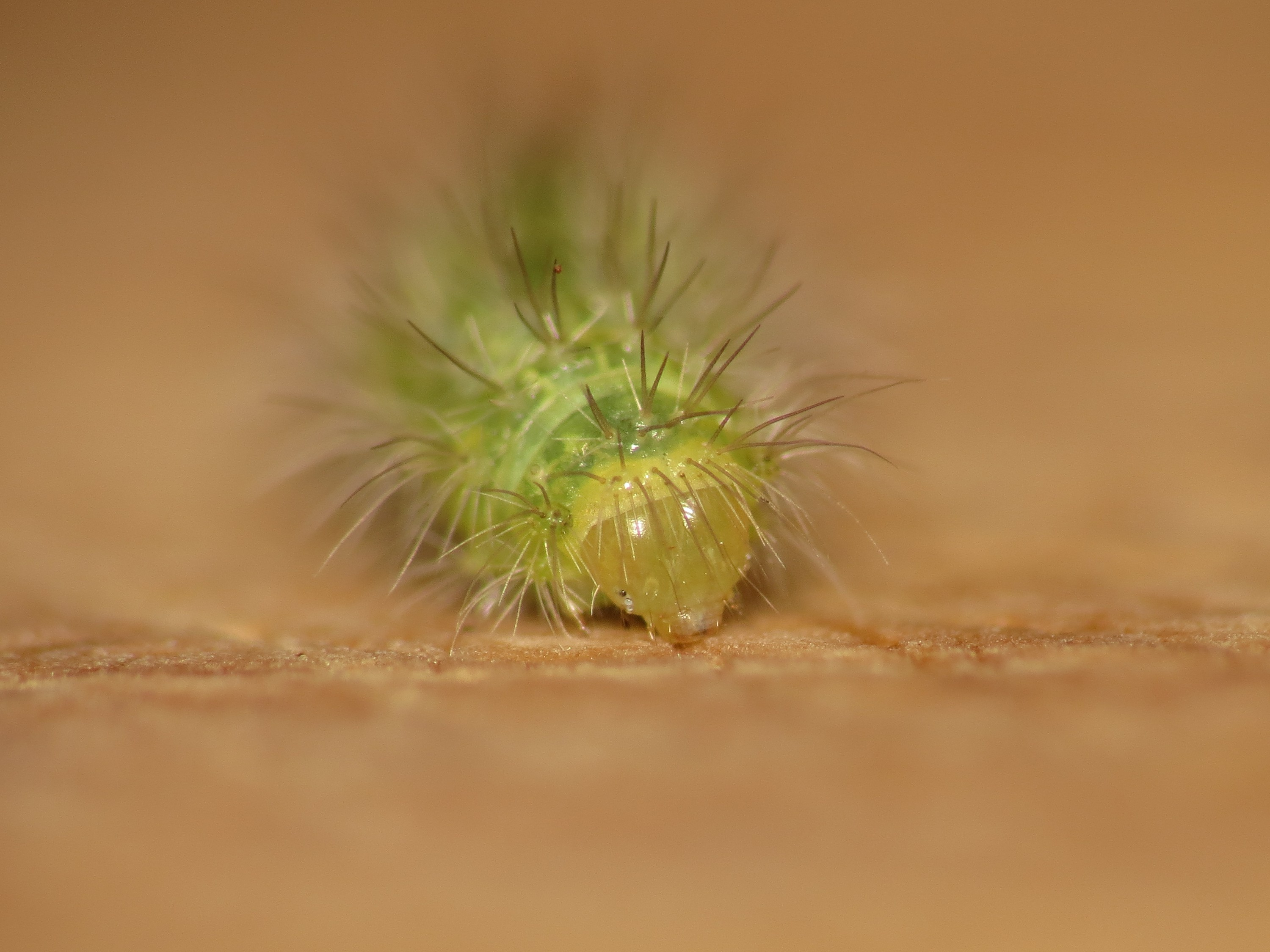

== Distribution ==
It is found in Europe, central Asia, Japan, North Africa and North America.
