= Dwarf morning glory =

Dwarf morning glory is a common name for several plants and may refer to:

- Convolvulus tricolor, native to Mediterranean Europe
- Convolvulus cantabrica
- Evolvulus
