= Emmelina amseli =

Scientific classification
- Kingdom: Animalia
- Phylum: Arthropoda
- Clade: Pancrustacea
- Class: Insecta
- Order: Lepidoptera
- Family: Pterophoridae
- Genus: Emmelina
- Species: E. amseli

Binomial name
- Emmelina amseli (Bigot, 1969)

Synonyms
- Leioptilus amseli Bigot, 1969

Species of plume moth

Emmelina amseli is a moth of the family Pterophoridae. It is known from the Democratic Republic of Congo, Kenya and Tanzania.
