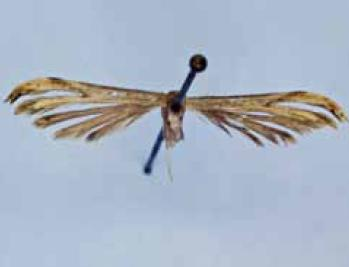

Scientific classification
- Kingdom: Animalia
- Phylum: Arthropoda
- Clade: Pancrustacea
- Class: Insecta
- Order: Lepidoptera
- Family: Pterophoridae
- Genus: Emmelina
- Species: E. buscki

Binomial name
- Emmelina buscki (Barnes & Lindsey, 1921)

Synonyms
- Adaina buscki Barnes & Lindsey, 1921

= Emmelina buscki =

Species of plume moth

Emmelina buscki, also known as the tropical morning glory plume moth, is a moth of the family Pterophoridae. It was described by William Barnes and Arthur Ward Lindsey in 1921. It is found in North America (Florida, Mexico, and the Caribbean), Central America, and northern South America.

The wingspan is 20–23 mm. Adults are tawny or brownish white, the abdomen with a slight brown dorsal stripe and some brown scales on the sides and below. The forewings are whitish tawny with scattered brown scales forming a dot in the cell and a dash before the cleft which projects toward a costal spot beyond the base of the cleft. The fringes are gray brown. The hindwings and fringes are gray brown. Adults are on wing in February, August, September and December.

The larvae feed on Ipomoea indica. They skeletonize the young leaves of their host plant.
