= Emmelina lochmaius =

Scientific classification
- Kingdom: Animalia
- Phylum: Arthropoda
- Clade: Pancrustacea
- Class: Insecta
- Order: Lepidoptera
- Family: Pterophoridae
- Genus: Emmelina
- Species: E. lochmaius

Binomial name
- Emmelina lochmaius (Bigot, 1974)

Synonyms
- Leioptilus lochmaius Bigot, 1974

Species of plume moth

Emmelina lochmaius is a moth of the family Pterophoridae. It is known from Gabon.
