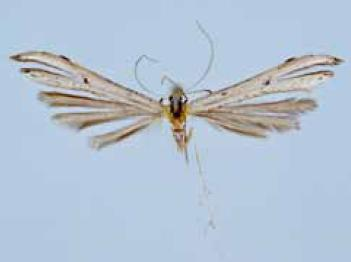

Scientific classification
- Kingdom: Animalia
- Phylum: Arthropoda
- Class: Insecta
- Order: Lepidoptera
- Family: Pterophoridae
- Genus: Emmelina
- Species: E. suspiciosus

Binomial name
- Emmelina suspiciosus (Meyrick, 1921)

Synonyms
- Pterophorus suspiciosus Meyrick, 1921; Oidaematophorus suspiciosus

= Emmelina suspiciosus =

Species of plume moth from Ecuador

Emmelina suspiciosus is a moth of the family Pterophoridae. It is found in Ecuador.
