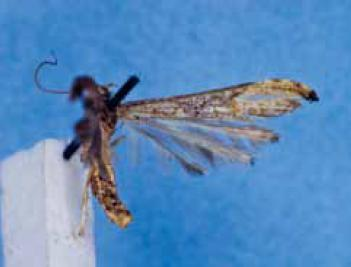

Scientific classification
- Kingdom: Animalia
- Phylum: Arthropoda
- Class: Insecta
- Order: Lepidoptera
- Family: Pterophoridae
- Genus: Emmelina
- Species: E. aethes

Binomial name
- Emmelina aethes (Walsingham, 1915)

Synonyms
- Pterophorus aethes Walsingham, 1915; Oidaematophorus aethes

= Emmelina aethes =

Species of plume moth

Emmelina aethes is a moth of the family Pterophoridae. It is found in Mexico.

The wingspan is about 19 mm. Adults are on wing in September.
