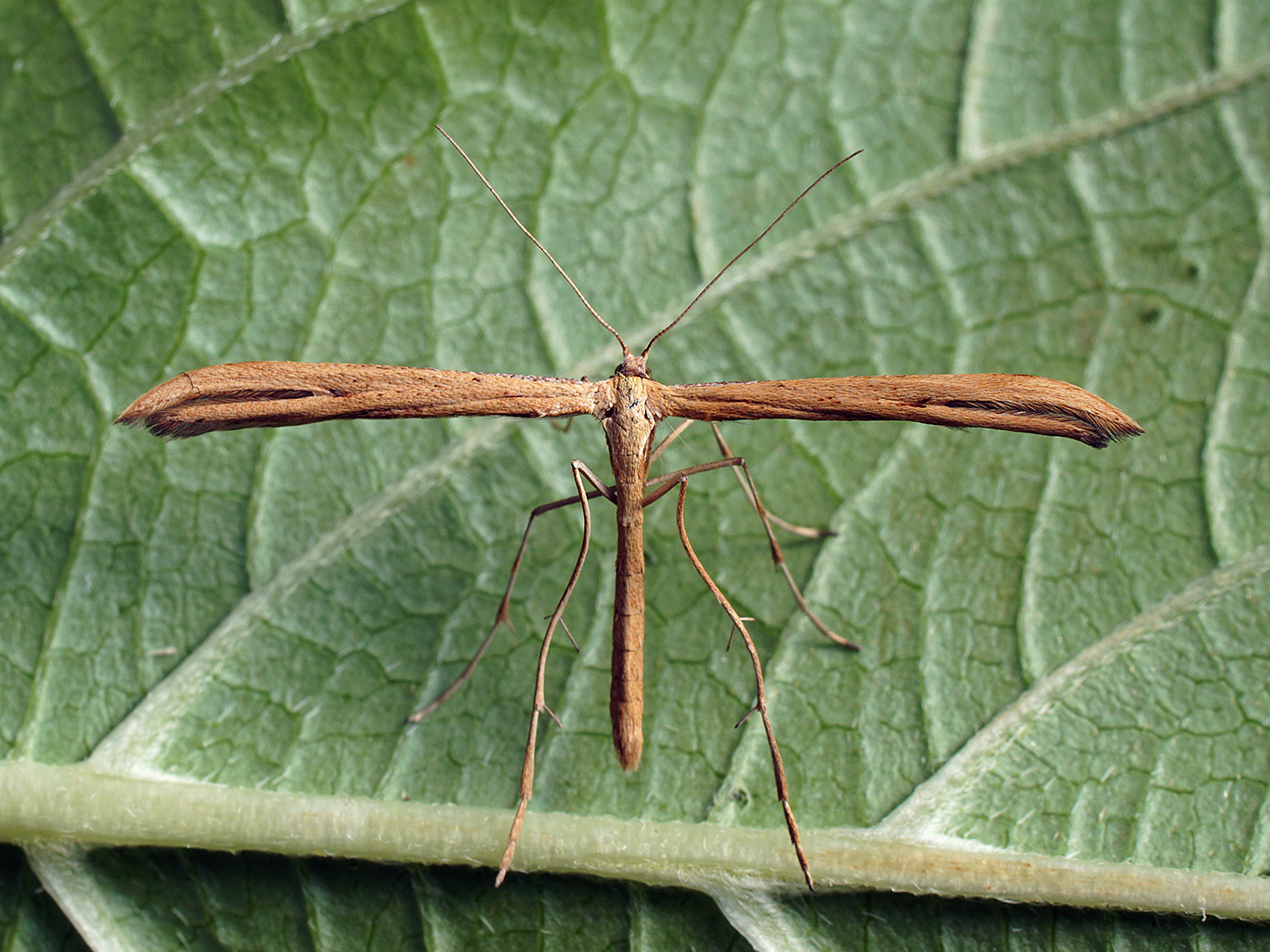
- Emmelina monodactyla

Scientific classification
- Domain: Eukaryota
- Kingdom: Animalia
- Phylum: Arthropoda
- Class: Insecta
- Order: Lepidoptera
- Family: Pterophoridae
- Tribe: Oidaematophorini
- Genus: Emmelina; Tutt, 1905

= Emmelina =

Plume moth genus

Emmelina is a genus of moths in the family Pterophoridae with a nearly cosmopolitan distribution.

== Ecology ==
The species seem to be polyphagous, but representatives of the genera Convolvulus and Calystegia are preferred.

== Species ==
As of version 1.1.23.125, the Catalogue of the Pterophoroidea of the World lists the following species for genus Emmelina:

- Emmelina aethes (Walsingham, 1915)
- Emmelina amseli (Bigot, 1969)
- Emmelina argoteles (Meyrick, 1922)
- Emmelina bigoti Gibeaux, 1990
- Emmelina buscki (Barnes & Lindsey, 1921)
- Emmelina compactus Gielis, 2016
- Emmelina devriesi (Landry & Gielis, 1992)
- Emmelina doroshkini Ustjuzhanin & Kovtunovich, 2021
- Emmelina glochinias (Meyrick, 1908)
- Emmelina inna Ustjuzhanin & Kovtunovich, 2022
- Emmelina jason (Meyrick, 1930)
- Emmelina lochmaius (Bigot, 1974)
- Emmelina monodactyla (Linnaeus, 1758)
- Emmelina paradevriesi Gielis, 2016
- Emmelina reshetnikovi Ustjuzhanin & Kovtunovich, 2021
- Emmelina suspiciosus (Meyrick, 1921)
- Emmelina vera Ustjuzhanin & Kovtunovich, 2022
