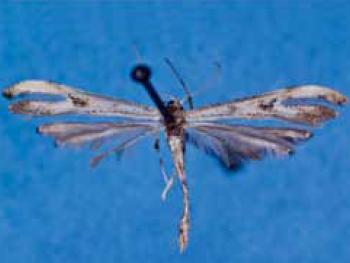

Scientific classification
- Kingdom: Animalia
- Phylum: Arthropoda
- Class: Insecta
- Order: Lepidoptera
- Family: Pterophoridae
- Genus: Emmelina
- Species: E. jason

Binomial name
- Emmelina jason (Meyrick, 1930)

Synonyms
- Pterophorus jason Meyrick, 1930; Hellinsia jason

= Emmelina jason =

Species of plume moth

Emmelina jason is a moth of the family Pterophoridae. It is found in Brazil.
