= Emmelina bigoti =

Scientific classification
- Kingdom: Animalia
- Phylum: Arthropoda
- Clade: Pancrustacea
- Class: Insecta
- Order: Lepidoptera
- Family: Pterophoridae
- Genus: Emmelina
- Species: E. bigoti

Binomial name
- Emmelina bigoti Gibeaux, 1990

Species of plume moth

Emmelina bigoti is a moth of the family Pterophoridae. It is known from Kenya.
