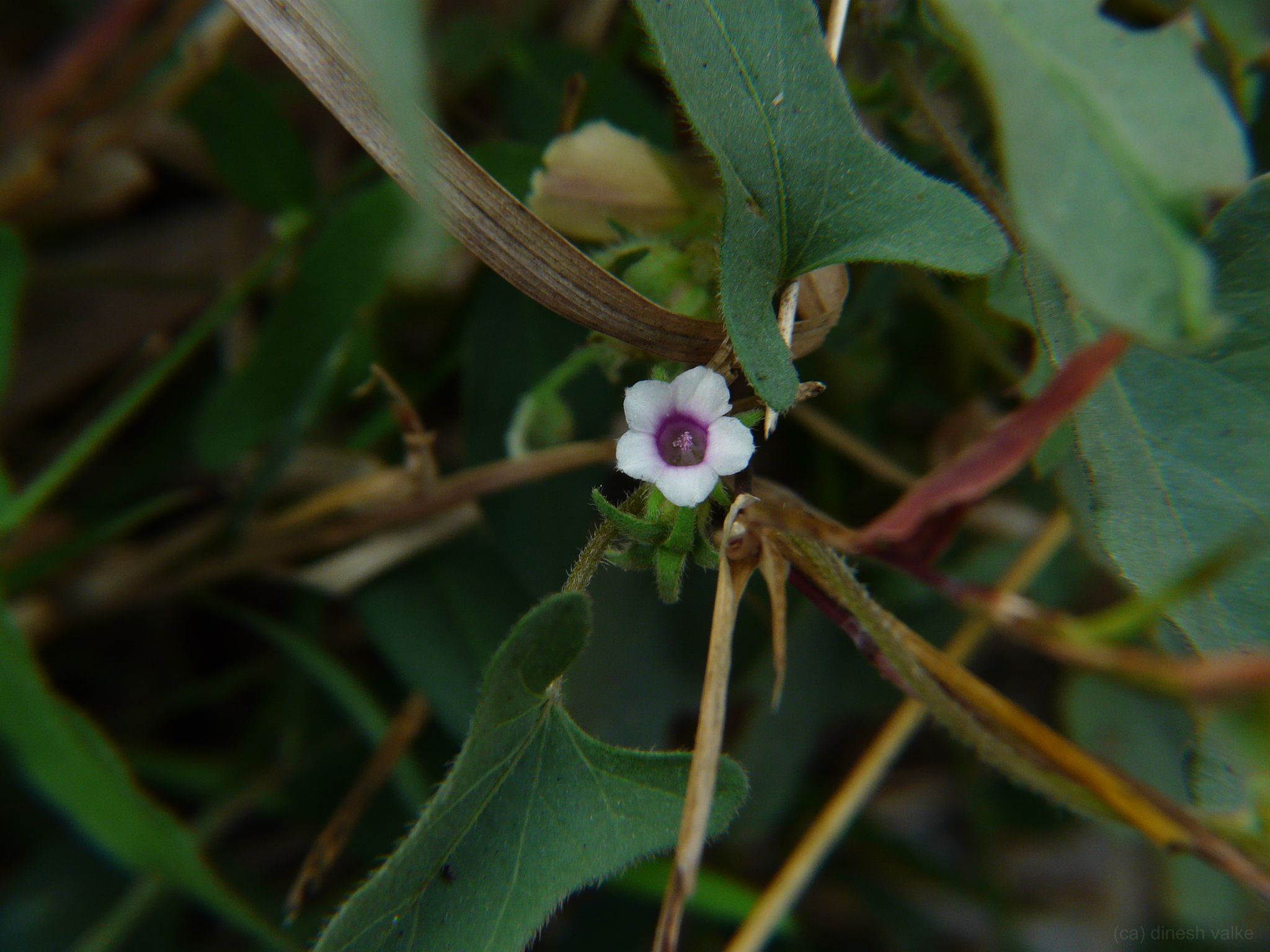

Scientific classification
- Kingdom: Plantae
- Clade: Embryophytes
- Clade: Tracheophytes
- Clade: Angiosperms
- Clade: Eudicots
- Clade: Asterids
- Order: Solanales
- Family: Convolvulaceae
- Genus: Ipomoea
- Species: I. eriocarpa

Binomial name
- Ipomoea eriocarpa R.Br., 1810

= Ipomoea eriocarpa =

Species of plant

Ipomoea eriocarpa is a species of scrambling annual plant in the family of Convolvulaceae which is native to much of tropical and subtropical Afro-Eurasia and northern Australia. Traditionally, various parts of the plant have been used for food and medicinal purposes.
