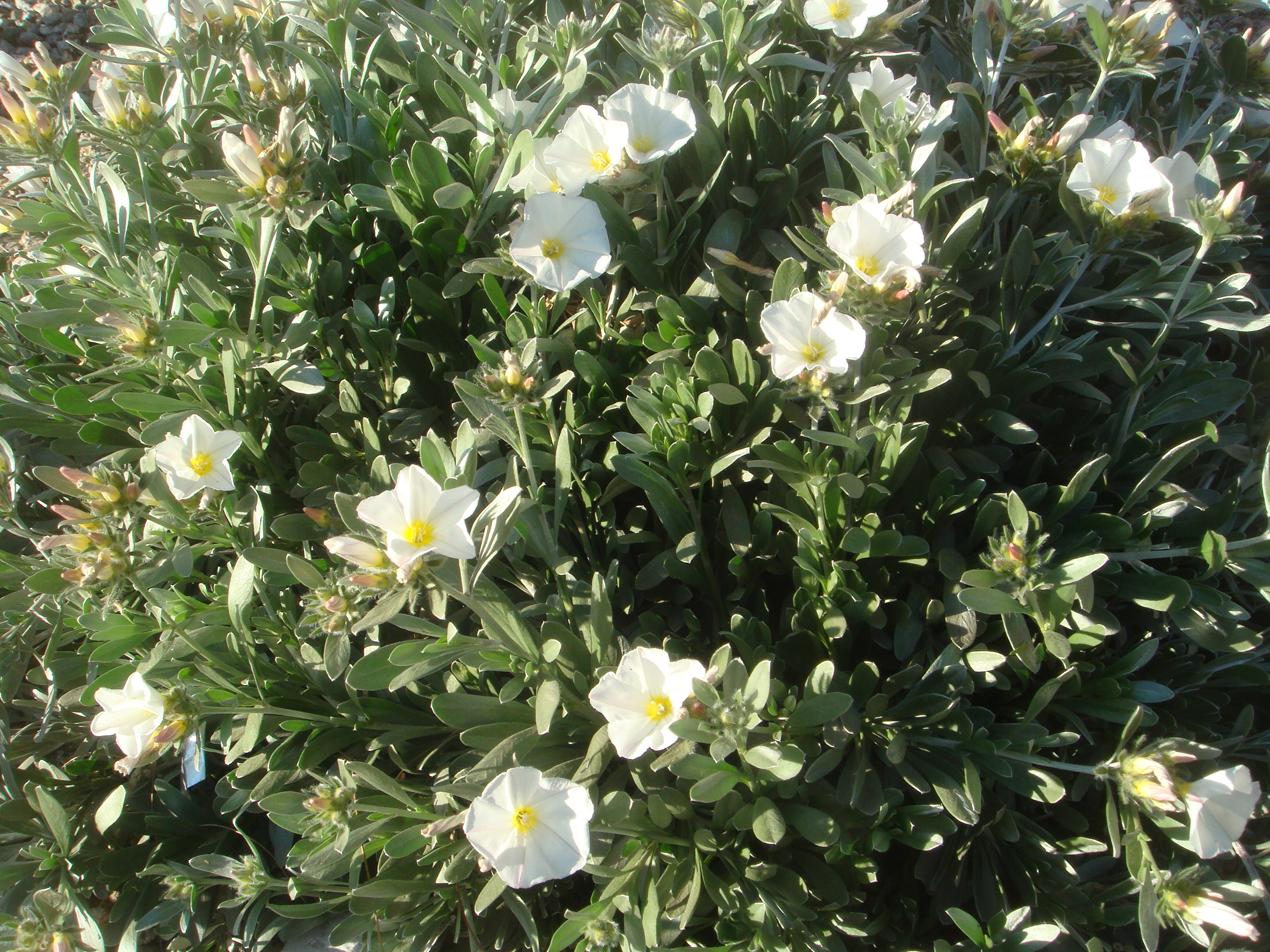

Scientific classification
- Kingdom: Plantae
- Clade: Embryophytes
- Clade: Tracheophytes
- Clade: Spermatophytes
- Clade: Angiosperms
- Clade: Eudicots
- Clade: Asterids
- Order: Solanales
- Family: Convolvulaceae
- Genus: Convolvulus
- Species: C. cneorum

Binomial name
- Convolvulus cneorum L.

= Convolvulus cneorum =

Species of plant

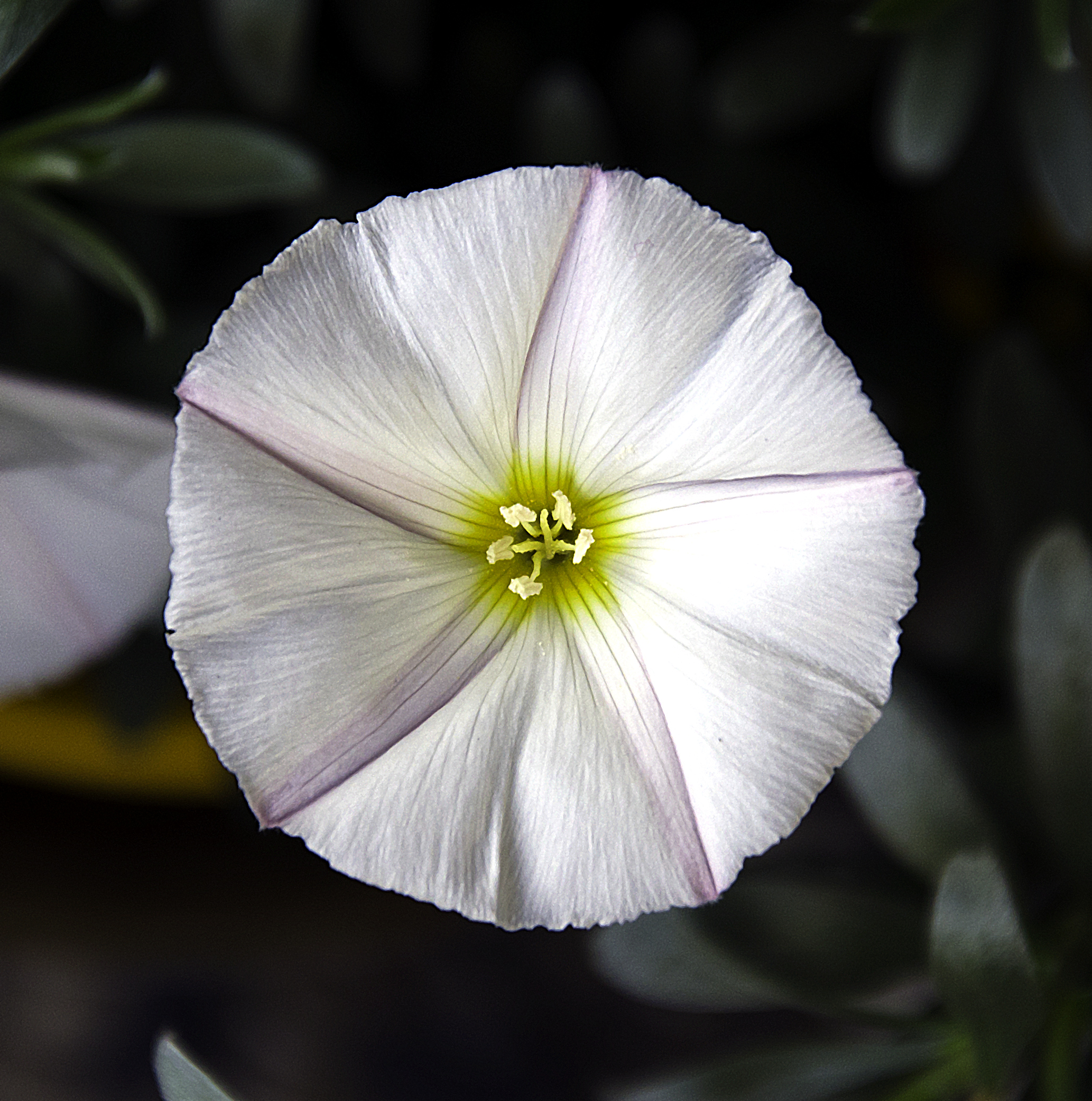

Convolvulus cneorum, the silverbush or shrubby bindweed, is a species of flowering plant in the family Convolvulaceae, which contains many plants described as "bindweed". The Latin specific epithet cneorum is a word of Greek origin referring to a small olive-like plant, possibly a species of Daphne.

== Description ==
Unlike other species in the genus, it is an evergreen shrub rather than a vine, forming a low mound 0.6–1.2 m (2 ft 0 in – 3 ft 11 in) in height, with a similar spread. It produces many pink buds unfurling to white 2.5–4 cm (1–2 in) diameter flowers which are white with a yellow throat. These appear at the end of stems in loose panicles and may almost completely cover the plants for a long period from spring to the summer months. The leaves are grey-green and are covered in fine hairs which give the plant a silvery appearance.

== Distribution ==
The species is found in coastal areas of Spain, Italy, Croatia and Albania. In Italy it is found on the coast of Tuscany and western Sicily and on the islands of Capri and Li Galli. In Croatia it is found on many of the islands off the coast. It is often found growing in cracks in rocks.

== Cultivation ==
The species prefers an alkaline soil, full sun and good drainage. It tolerates near-drought conditions for short periods, and is cold hardy to −9 C. It has gained the Royal Horticultural Society's Award of Garden Merit (confirmed 2017).
