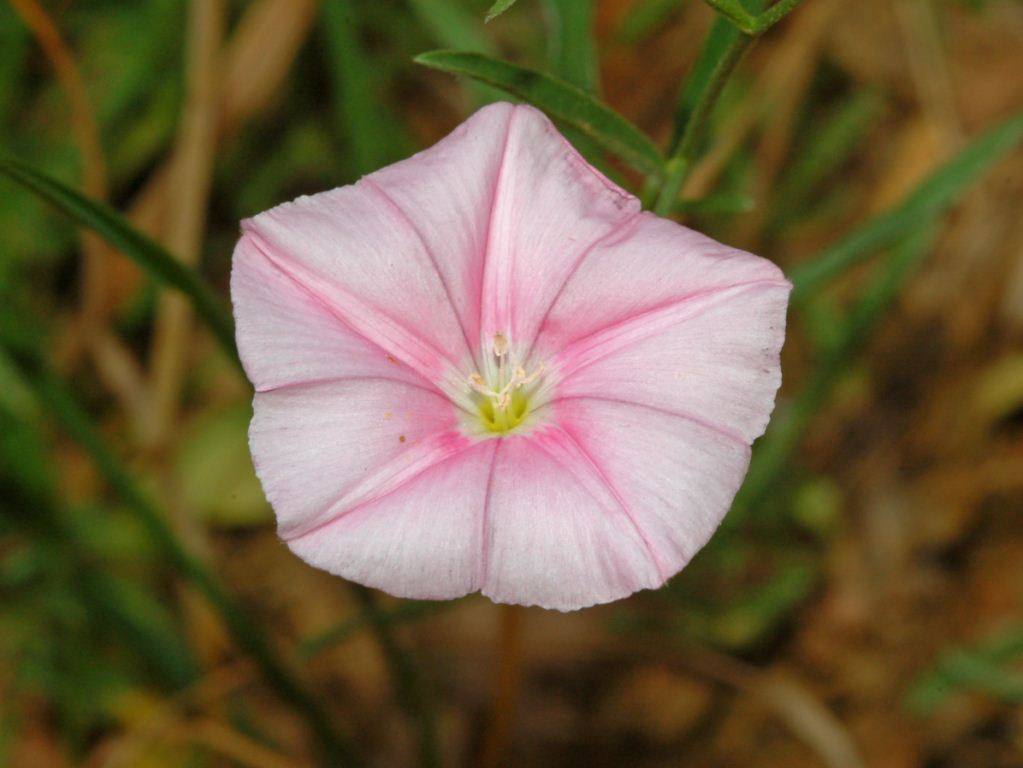

Scientific classification
- Kingdom: Plantae
- Clade: Tracheophytes
- Clade: Angiosperms
- Clade: Eudicots
- Clade: Asterids
- Order: Solanales
- Family: Convolvulaceae
- Genus: Convolvulus
- Species: C. cantabrica

Binomial name
- Convolvulus cantabrica L.

Synonyms
- Convolvulus cardiosepalus Boiss.; Convolvulus dorycnioides De Not.

= Convolvulus cantabrica =

Cantabrican morning glory

Species of bindweed

Convolvulus cantabrica, common name Cantabrican morning glory or dwarf morning glory, is a herbaceous perennial plant belonging to the genus Convolvulus of the family Convolvulaceae.

== Description ==
This bindweed is a hemicryptophyte scapose plant reaching on average 20–50 centimetres (7.9–19.7 in) in height. It has simple, alternate, lanceolate leaves, coarsely hairy on both sides. The wide funnel-shaped flowers are actinomorphic ("star shaped", "radial") and arranged on a long petiole at the leaf axils. The corolla is 15–25 mm long and usually pale pink, but it can be completely white. The flowers are hermaphrodite and pollinated by insects (entomogamy). The flowering period extends from May through October. The fruits are globose and pubescent capsules with 2–4 brownish seeds.

== Gallery ==
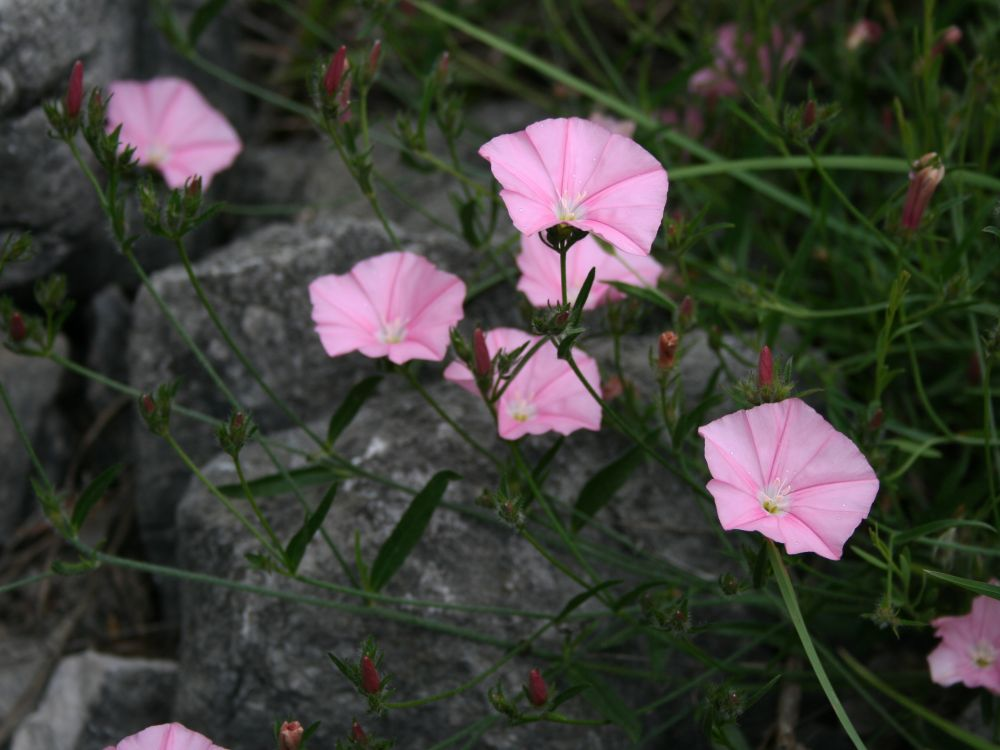
Plant of Convolvulus cantabrica

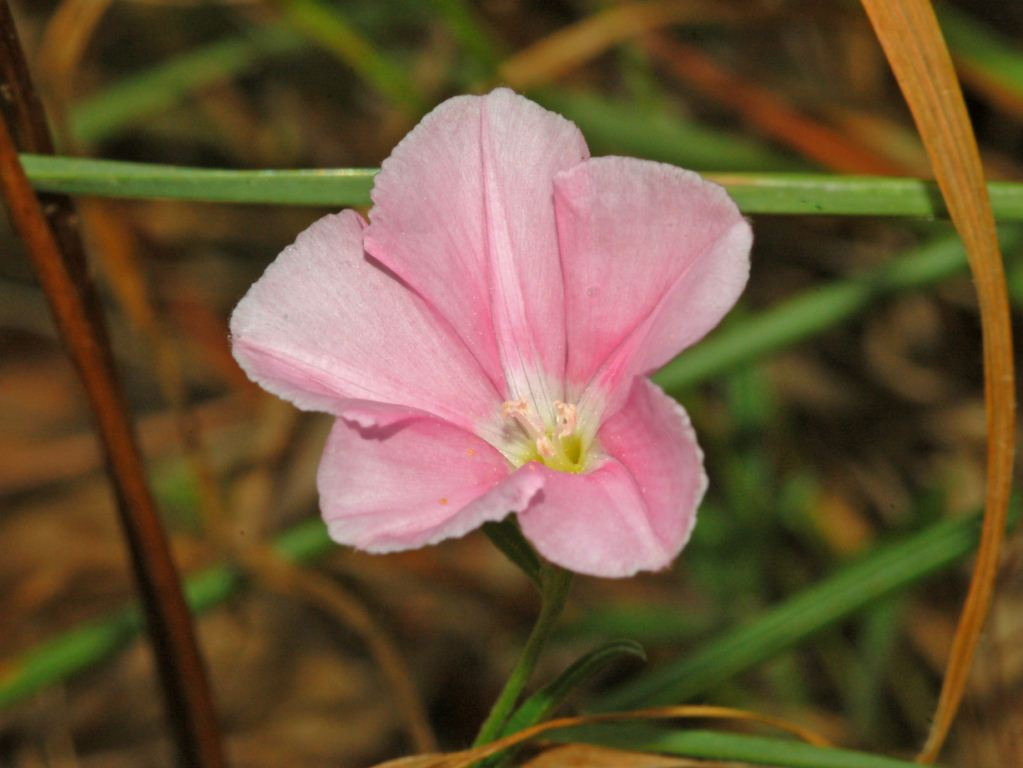
Close-up of a flower of Convolvulus cantabrica

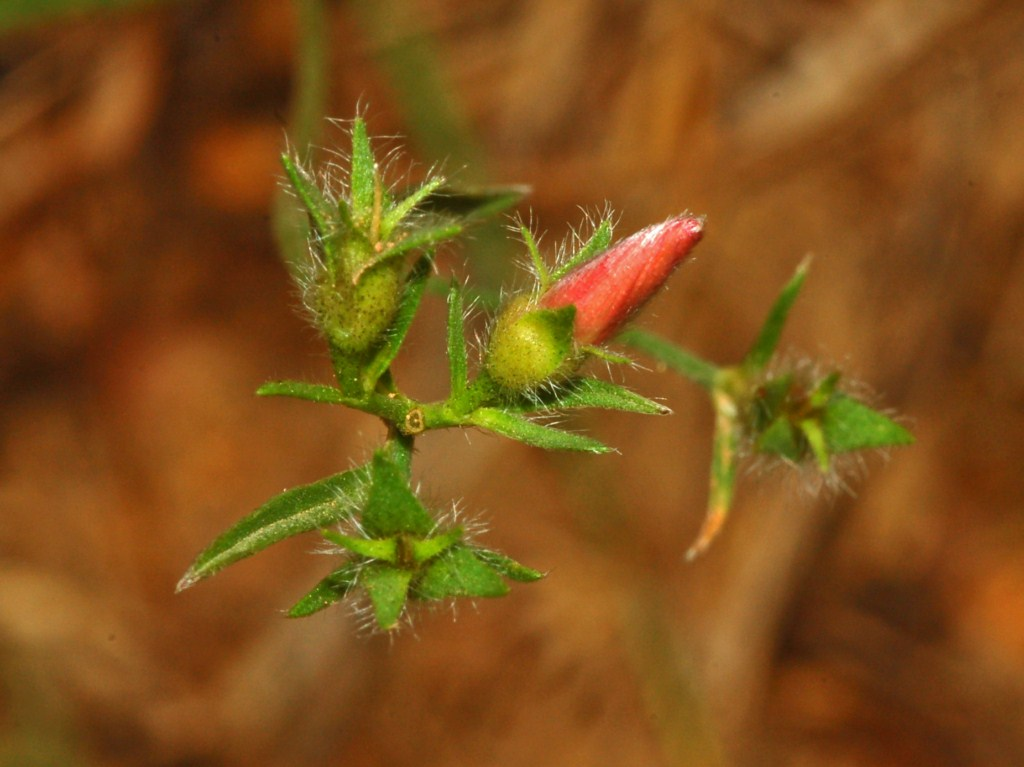
Blossom of Convolvulus cantabrica

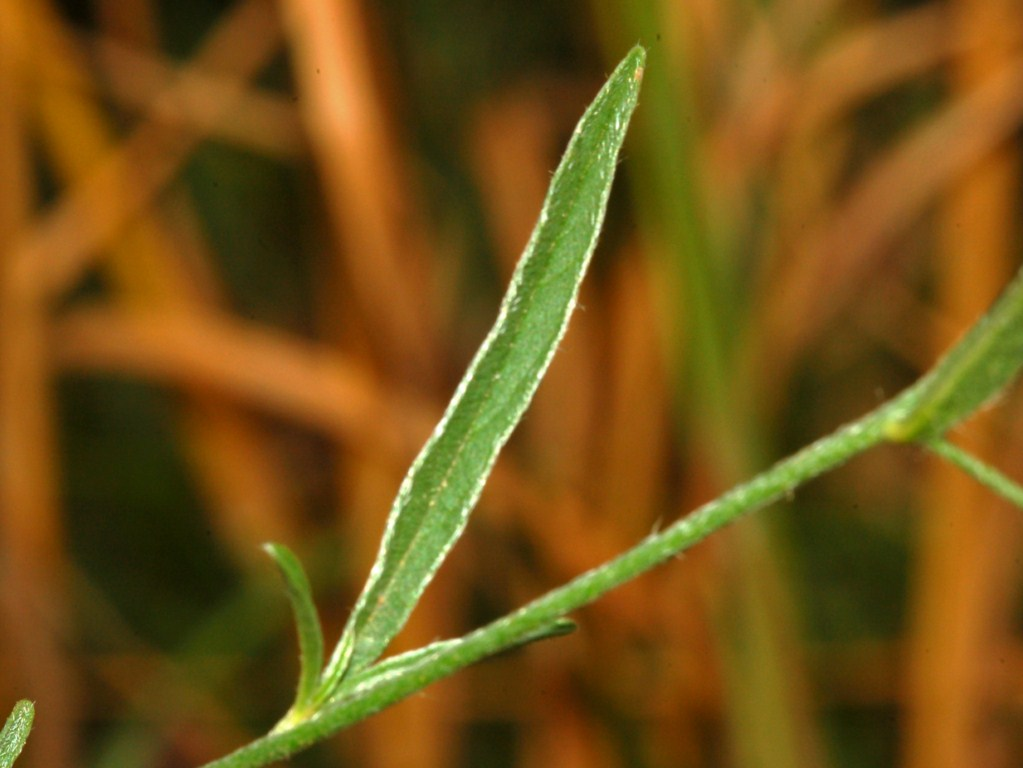
Leaf of Convolvulus cantabrica

== Distribution ==
This species is native to southern Europe and widespread in the Mediterranean coasts.

== Habitat ==
Convolvulus cantabrica prefers rocky places, sunny slopes, xerophilous prairies, dry grassland and scrublands with calcareous soil, at an altitude of 0–1,300 metres (0–4,265 ft) above sea level.
