= Orobanche indica =

Orobanche indica can refer to the following plant species:

- Orobanche indica Buch.-Ham. ex Roxb., a synonym of Orobanche aegyptiaca Pers.
- Orobanche indica Wall., a synonym of Orobanche cernua Loefl. var. cernua
- Orobanche indica Spreng., a synonym of Striga gesnerioides (Willd.) Vatke
