= Ghost pipe =

Ghost pipe is a common name for several things and may refer to:

- Monotropa uniflora, a parasitic member of the heath family native to the Americas and Asia
- Orobanche uniflora, a parasitic member of the broomrape family native to North America
