= Desert broomrape =

Desert broomrape can refer to several parasitic plants in the family Orobanchaceae, including:

- Cistanche deserticola
- Cistanche tubulosa
- Orobanche cooperi
- Orobanche ludoviciana
