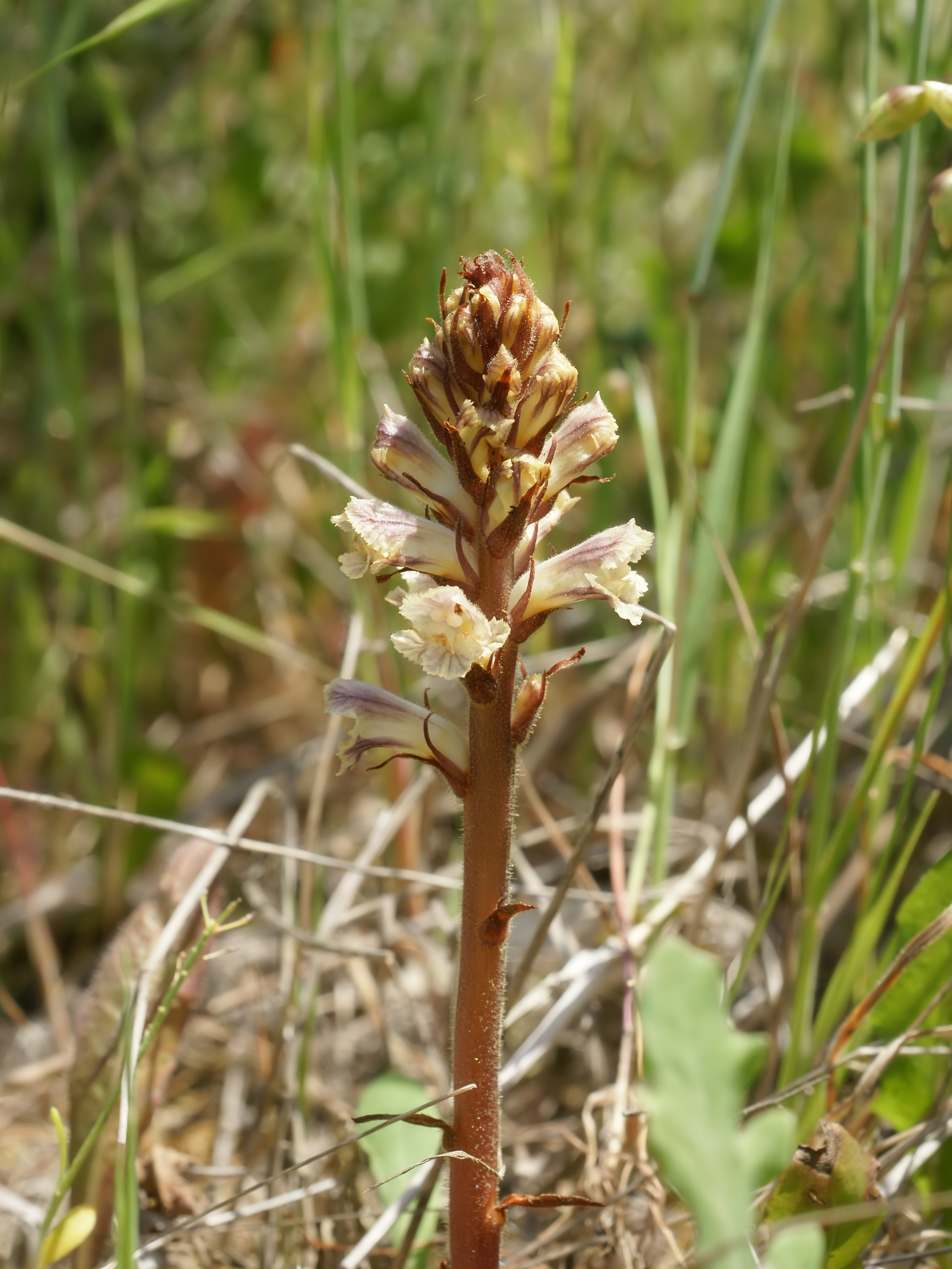

Scientific classification
- Kingdom: Plantae
- Clade: Tracheophytes
- Clade: Angiosperms
- Clade: Eudicots
- Clade: Asterids
- Order: Lamiales
- Family: Orobanchaceae
- Genus: Orobanche
- Species: O. crenata

Binomial name
- Orobanche crenata Forssk.

= Orobanche crenata =

Species of flowering plant

Orobanche crenata is a species of broomrape, commonly known as bean broomrape. It is a common parasite of the faba bean, Vicia faba. It is native to the Mediterranean basin in Europe and North Africa, the Arabian Peninsula, and Western Asia through to Iran. It has been introduced elsewhere, including Ethiopia. It has no chlorophyll, and gets its carbohydrates from the host's phloem, and water and minerals from the host's xylem. It is a constant threat to legume production. In the Apulia region of southern Italy, the stems of Orobanche crenata are gathered and eaten.
