= Orobanche pinorum =

Conservation status
- Apparently Secure (NatureServe)

Scientific classification
- Kingdom: Plantae
- Clade: Tracheophytes
- Clade: Angiosperms
- Clade: Eudicots
- Clade: Asterids
- Order: Lamiales
- Family: Orobanchaceae
- Genus: Orobanche
- Species: O. pinorum

Binomial name
- Orobanche pinorum Geyer ex Hook.

Species of flowering plant

Orobanche pinorum is a species of broomrape known by the common name conifer broomrape. It is native to the forests of western North America, where it is a parasite growing attached to the roots of other plants, usually Holodiscus species. This plant has an erect stem with a wide, thickened base and slender top growing 10–30 centimetres (3.9–11.8 in) tall. As a parasite taking its nutrients from a host plant, it lacks leaves and chlorophyll and is brownish or yellowish in color. The inflorescence is a dense, spreading array of purple-tinged yellowish flowers 1–2 centimetres (0.39–0.79 in) long.

== Reproduction ==
Orobanche pinorum is predominantly autogamous. It produces about 700 seeds per capsule and over 70,000 seeds per plant. There are some evidence of xenogamy, but potential pollinators were rarely observed.
