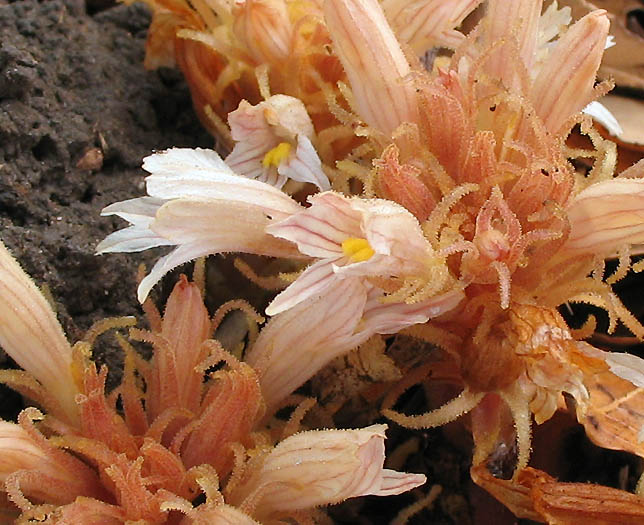

Conservation status
- Imperiled (NatureServe)

Scientific classification
- Kingdom: Plantae
- Clade: Tracheophytes
- Clade: Angiosperms
- Clade: Eudicots
- Clade: Asterids
- Order: Lamiales
- Family: Orobanchaceae
- Genus: Orobanche
- Species: O. vallicola

Binomial name
- Orobanche vallicola (Jeps.) Heckard

= Orobanche vallicola =

Species of flowering plant

Orobanche vallicola is a species of broomrape known by the common name hillside broomrape or valley broom rape.

It is endemic to California and grows in forest openings and woodlands.

== Description ==
Orobanche vallicola is a parasite growing attached to the roots of other plants, generally Sambucus species. The plant produces a thick, hairy, glandular pinkish stem up to about 40 centimeters tall.

As a parasite taking its nutrients from a host plant, it lacks leaves and chlorophyll.

The inflorescence is a cluster or branching array of flowers. Each tubular flower is up to 3 centimeters long, yellowish to pinkish and red-veined in color.
