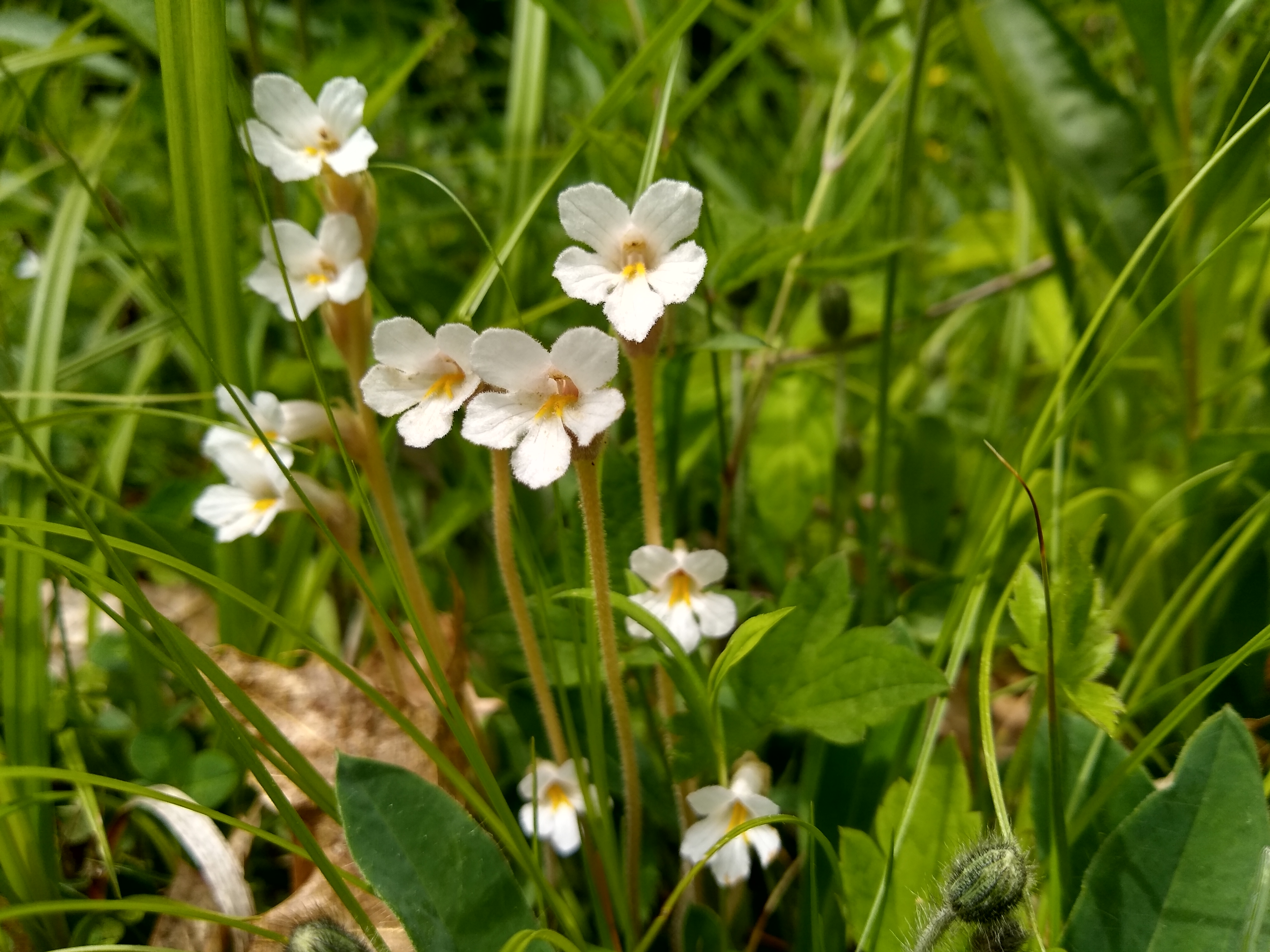
- Orobanche uniflora flowers

Conservation status
- Secure (NatureServe)

- Least Concern (IUCN 3.1)

Scientific classification
- Kingdom: Plantae
- Clade: Tracheophytes
- Clade: Angiosperms
- Clade: Eudicots
- Clade: Asterids
- Order: Lamiales
- Family: Orobanchaceae
- Genus: Orobanche
- Species: O. uniflora

Binomial name
- Orobanche uniflora L.

= Orobanche uniflora =

Species of flowering plant

Orobanche uniflora, commonly known as one-flowered broomrape, one-flowered cancer root, ghost pipe or naked broomrape, is an annual parasitic herbaceous plant. It is native to much of North America, where it is a parasitic plant, tapping nutrients from many other species of plants, including those in the families Asteraceae and Saxifragaceae and in the genus Sedum. The name "orobanche" can be translated to "vetch-strangler" and "uniflora" can be translated to "single-flower".

== Description ==
Orobanche uniflora grows to 3–10 centimetres (1 1/8–3 7/8 in) in height, with one purple-to-white flower with five petals per stem. The corolla is two-lipped, finely fringed with five similar lobes. The main stem is under the ground, with only the pedicels being seen and each pedicel containing only one flower. The stems are grayish tan. No leaves are on the plant or offshoot from it. It reproduces from its seeds, which are produced from fruit that has two sections. Many seeds are produced from the plant's fruit.

The plant is parasitic, feeding off of other plants' root systems, often on the flowering plant genus Sedum which are also known as stonecrops. It does not produce chlorophyll, rather gaining its nutrients, such as carbohydrates, from other plant species. Due to not producing chlorophyll, the plant does not produce any green portions. It is not agreed upon by botanists whether the plant's flowers are pollinated by insects or if they are pollinated by the plant itself. The life expectancy of the species is unknown.

The species closely resembles Orobanche fasciculata. The two can be differentiated by their bracts and number of flowers. The bract looks like a small leaf and is found at the junction of where each flower stalk is attached to the underground stem. O. uniflora's bracts are hairless while O. fasciculata's bracts are hairy. The flowers of O. uniflora have one to three flowers on each stem branch while O. fasciculata has three to ten flowers per stem branch. O. fasciculata has flowers that are pinkish to creamy-white, unlike O. uniflora which is tinged with violet.

== Taxonomy ==
Orobanche uniflora was given its binomial name in 1753 by Carl Linnaeus. It is classified in the genus Orobanche as part of the family Orobanchaceae. It has 30 synonyms.

Table of Synonyms
Name	Year	Rank	Notes
Anoplanthus uniflorus (L.) Endl.	1839	species	≡ hom.
Anoplon biflorum G.Don	1838	species	= het.
Aphyllon inundatum Suksd.	1906	species	= het.
Aphyllon minutum Suksd.	1900	species	= het.
Aphyllon purpureum (A.Heller) Holub	1998	species	= het.
Aphyllon sedi Suksd.	1900	species	= het.
Aphyllon uniflorum (L.) A.Gray	1848	species	≡ hom.
Aphyllon uniflorum var. occidentale Greene	1894	variety	= het.
Gymnocaulis biflora Nutt.	1848	species	= het.
Gymnocaulis uniflora (L.) Nutt.	1848	species	≡ hom.
Orobanche biflora Nutt.	1818	species	= het.
Orobanche porphyrantha Beck	1927	species	= het.
Orobanche sedii (Suksd.) Fernald	1926	species	= het.
Orobanche terrae-novae Fernald	1926	species	= het.
Orobanche tuberosa f. inundata Beck	1930	form	= het.
Orobanche uniflora f. inundata (Suksd.) Beck	1930	form	= het.
Orobanche uniflora var. minuta (Suksd.) Beck	1930	variety	= het.
Orobanche uniflora f. nana Stapf	1930	form	= het.
Orobanche uniflora subsp. occidentalis (Greene) Abrams ex Ferris	1958	subspecies	= het.
Orobanche uniflora var. occidentalis (Greene) Roy L.Taylor & MacBryde	1978	variety	= het.
Orobanche uniflora var. purpurea (A.Heller) Achey	1933	variety	= het.
Orobanche uniflora var. sedi (Suksd.) Achey	1933	variety	= het.
Orobanche uniflora f. sedi (Suksd.) Beck	1930	form	= het.
Orobanche uniflora var. terrae-novae (Fernald) Achey	1933	variety	= het.
Orobanche uniflora var. typica Achey	1933	variety	≡ hom., not validly publ.
Phelypaea biflora Spreng.	1825	species	= het.
Thalesia minuta (Suksd.) Rydb.	1909	species	= het.
Thalesia purpurea A.Heller	1897	species	= het.
Thalesia sedii (Suksd.) Rydb.	1909	species	= het.
Thalesia uniflora (L.) Britton	1894	species	≡ hom.
Notes: ≡ homotypic synonym; = heterotypic synonym

== Habitat ==
The plant can be found in woods, thickets, and mountains as well as by stream banks, and is widespread in much of North America. Unlike other species in the genus Orobanche, O. uniflora is largely a species that can be commonly found in forests. The species has been found surviving in both the sunlight and shaded areas, as well as in a variety of different types of soil. Its habitat is restricted to places where there are plenty of host plants. It might be difficult for this species to survive in an area where its host plants are sparsely found.

A specimen is contained within the botany department of the Smithsonian National Museum of Natural History and another specimen has been photographed at Hells Canyon National Recreation Area. It is considered rare or vulnerable in 17 states and five Canadian provinces. The species was identified as being of Special Concern in Minnesota in 1984 and was changed to endangered in 2013. When it was originally listed as a Special Concern in Minnesota, only seven populations were known to exist.

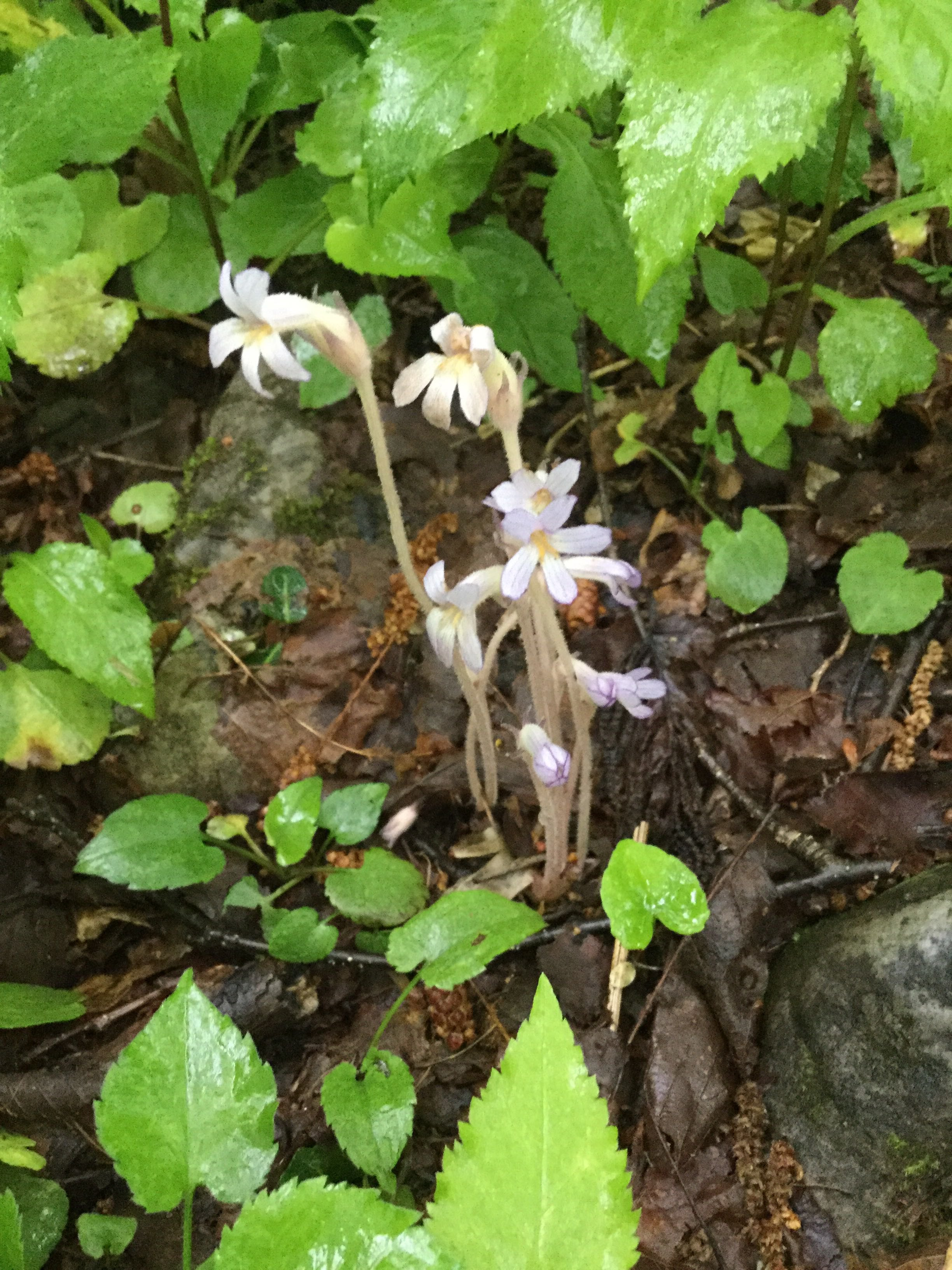
Orobanche uniflora flowering in a Vermont woodland setting
