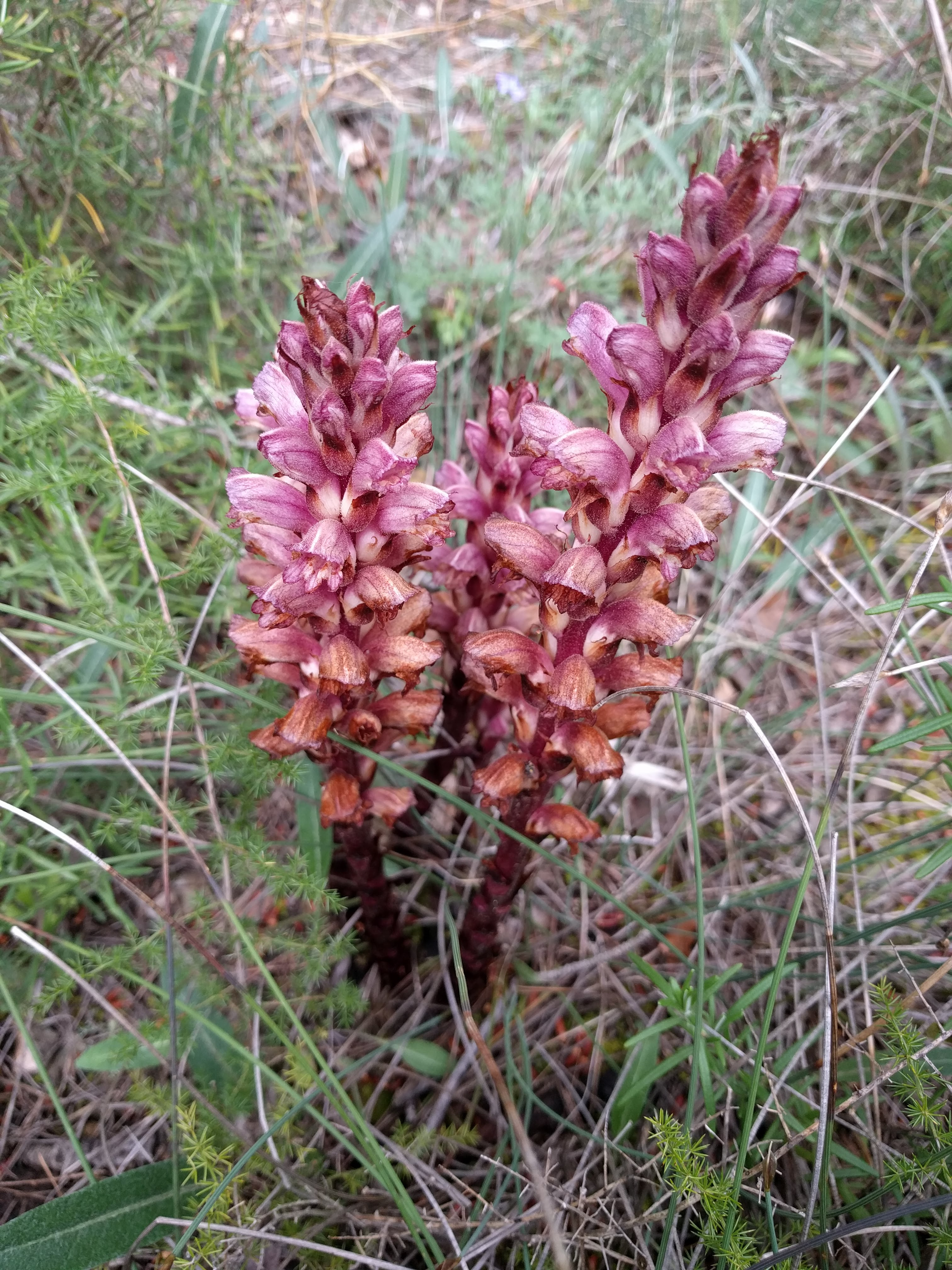

Scientific classification
- Kingdom: Plantae
- Clade: Tracheophytes
- Clade: Angiosperms
- Clade: Eudicots
- Clade: Asterids
- Order: Lamiales
- Family: Orobanchaceae
- Genus: Orobanche
- Species: O. latisquama

Binomial name
- Orobanche latisquama (F. W. Schultz) Batt.

Synonyms
- Ceratocalyx fimbriata Lange; Ceratocalyx macrolepis Coss.; Boulardia latisquama F. W. Schultz; Orobanche latisquama f. ochroleuca Maire; Orobanche macrolepis (Coss.) Beck

= Orobanche latisquama =

Species of plant

Orobanche latisquama is a species of broomrape in the family Orobanchaceae native to the western Mediterranean Basin. It is a parasite of rosemary and probably other shrubs (Cistus spp., Genista spp.).

== Description ==
Orobanche latisquama is a perennial plant. It has a simple purple stem with glandular hairs, leaves are a brownish purple also with glandular hairs. It has a 15–25 cm (5.9–9.8 in) long, dense inflorescence with multiple flowers. The flowers are purplish and characteristic, as the calyx is bell-shaped but with two lobes on the superior half, the column side, instead of being divided into two pieces from its base. Flowers during the spring.

== Distribution and habitat ==
Orobanche latisquama is native to the Iberian Peninsula (in central Portugal and south and east Spain), Northwest Africa (Morocco and Algeria) and the Balearic Islands (in Ibiza and Formentera). In Portugal it is mainly found in the Serras de Aire e Candeeiros Natural Park, Estremoz, and along the Tagus river basin. It inhabits woods, sclerophyllous shrublands and pine forests, on generally calcareous soils.

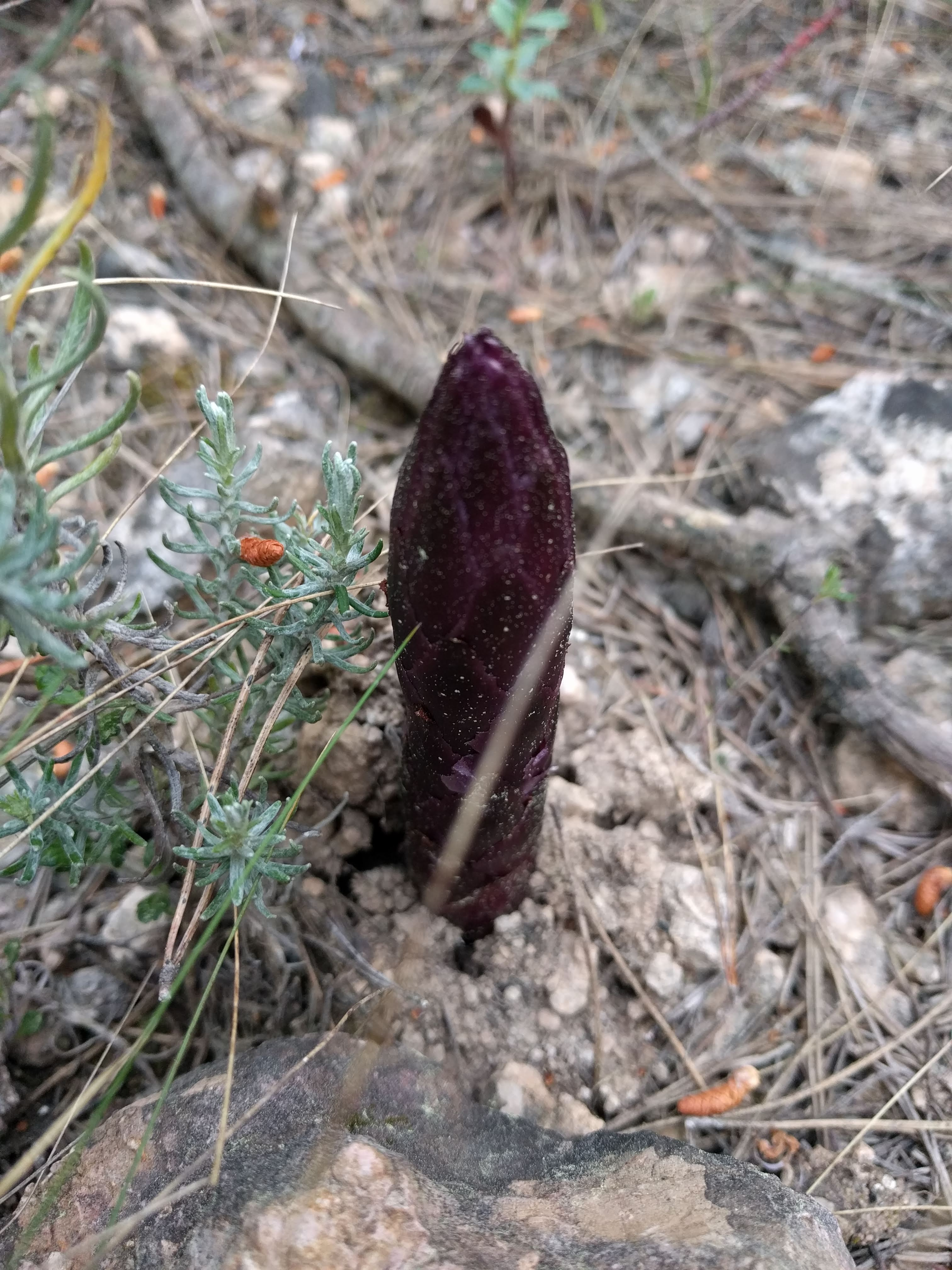

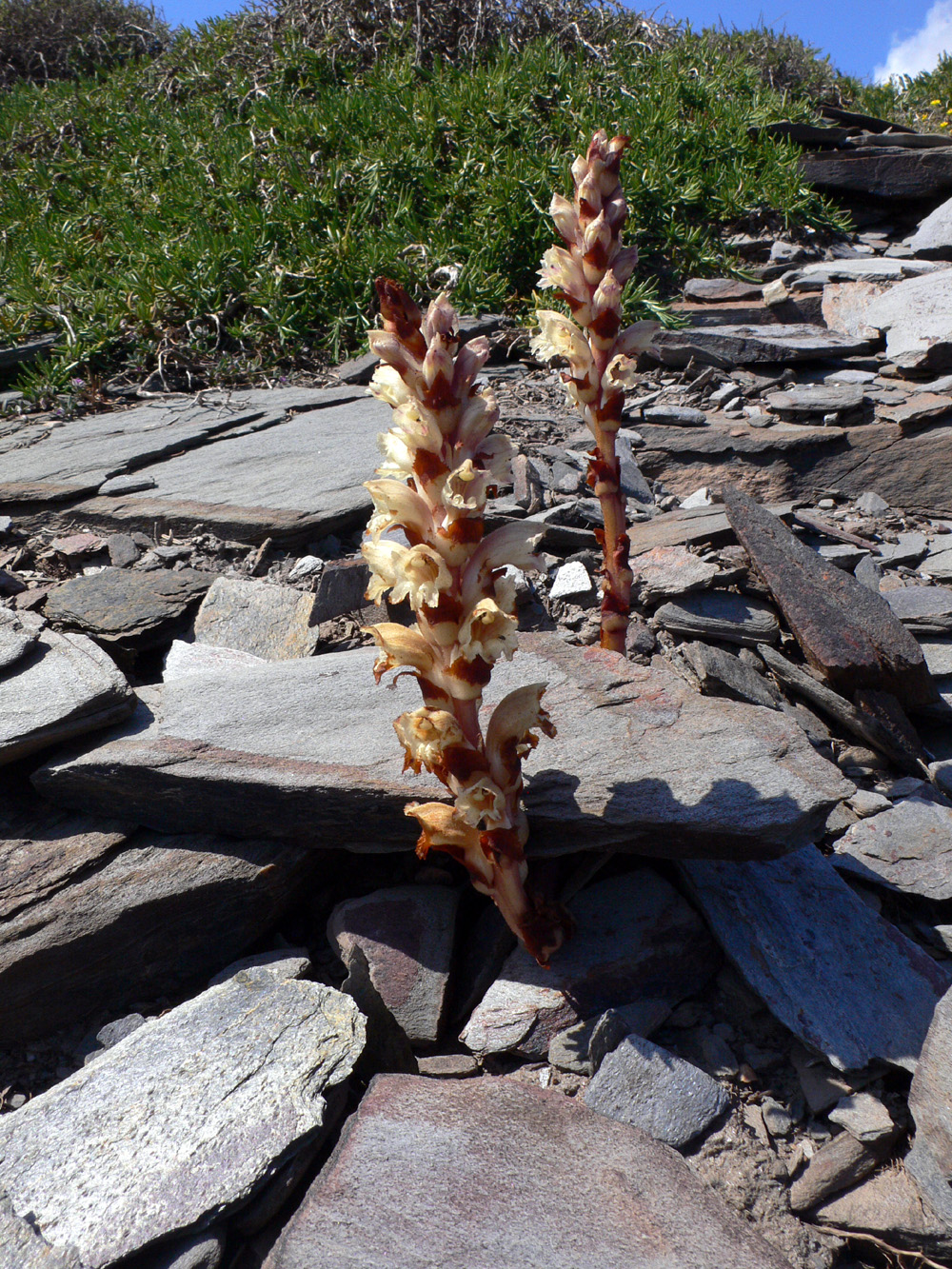
