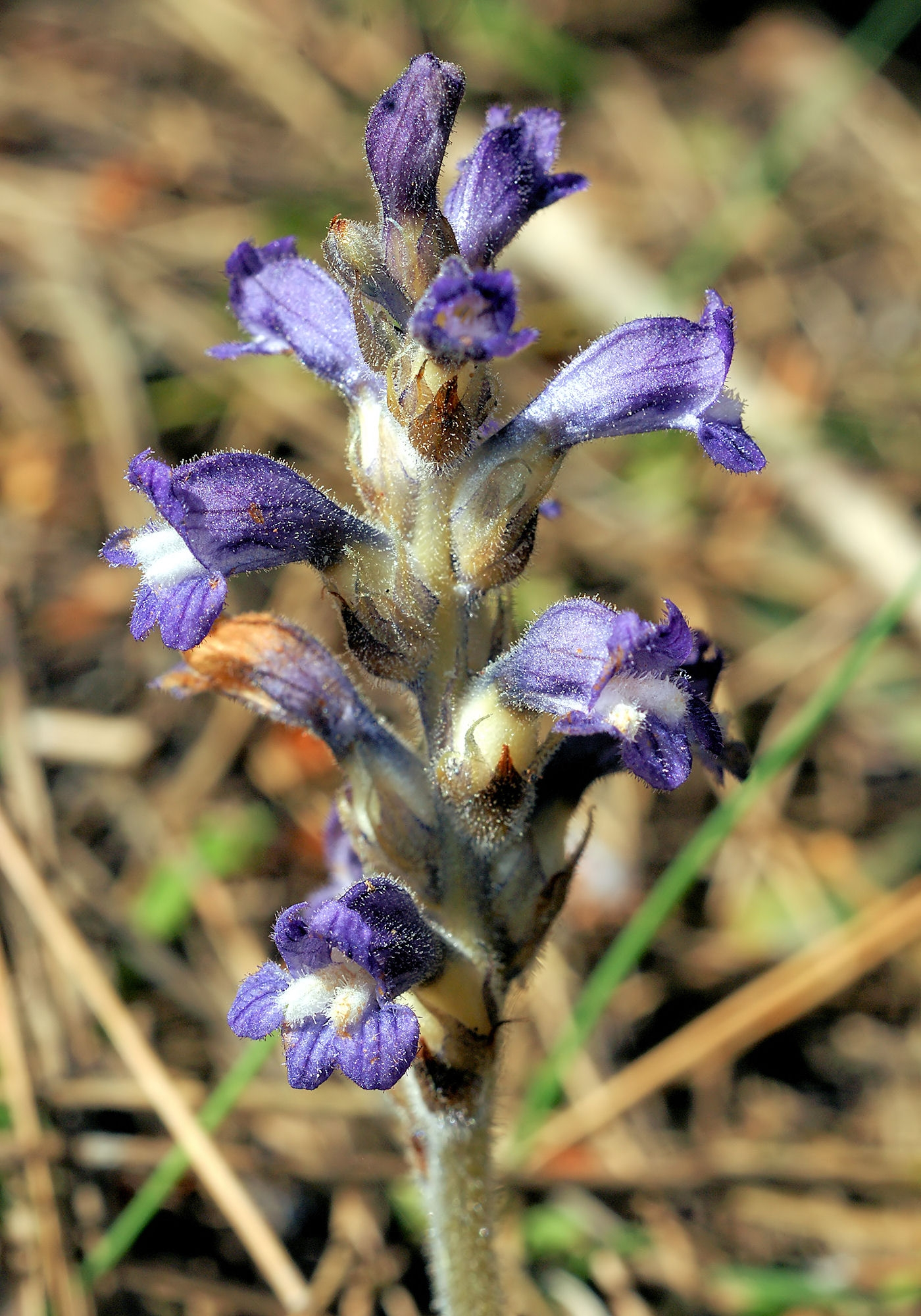

Scientific classification
- Kingdom: Plantae
- Clade: Tracheophytes
- Clade: Angiosperms
- Clade: Eudicots
- Clade: Asterids
- Order: Lamiales
- Family: Orobanchaceae
- Genus: Orobanche
- Species: O. mutelii

Binomial name
- Orobanche mutelii F.W.Schultz

= Orobanche mutelii =

Species of plant

Orobanche mutelii, the dwarf broomrape, is a species of plant in family Orobanchaceae. It is endemic to Malta.
