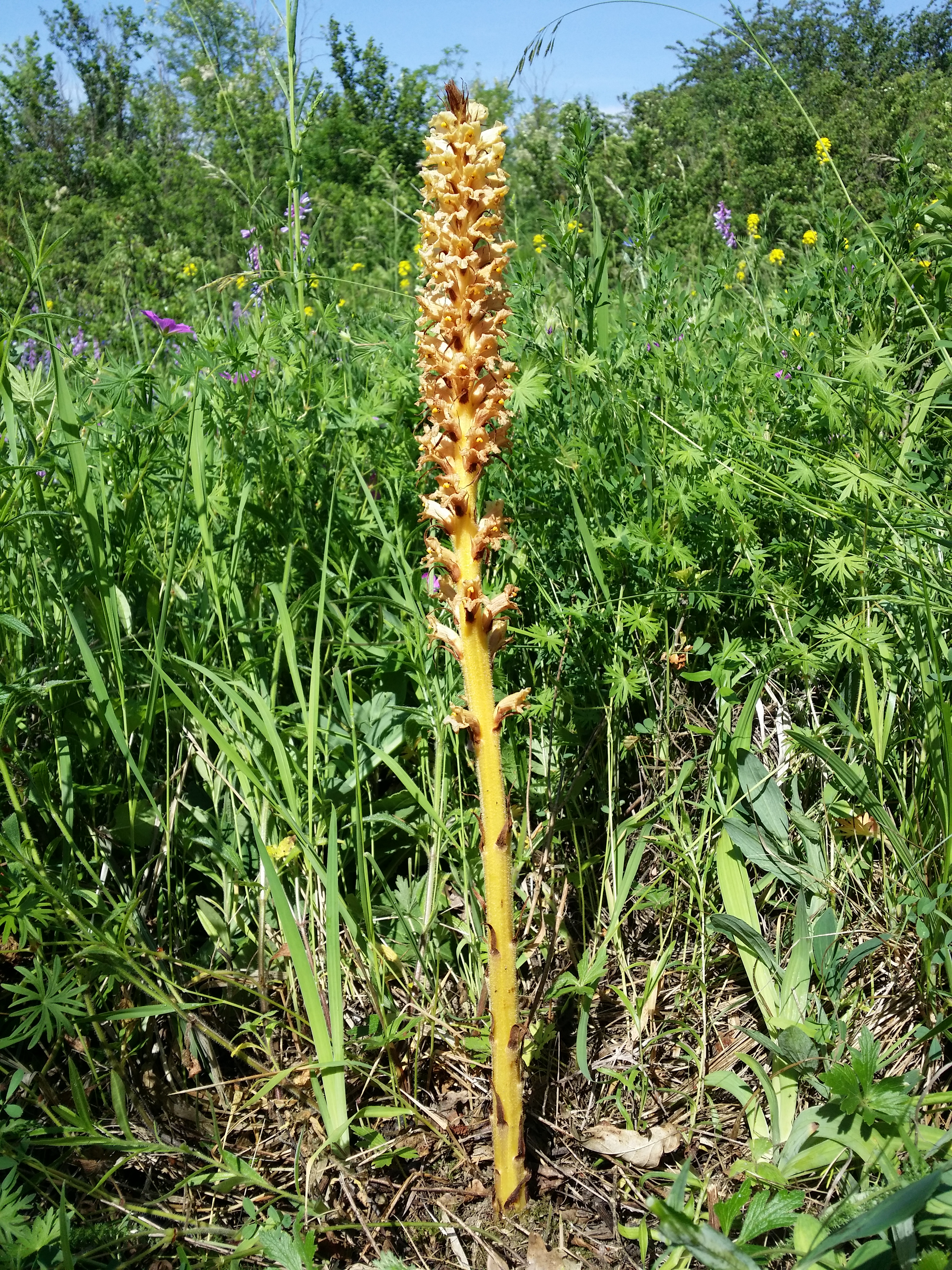

Scientific classification
- Kingdom: Plantae
- Clade: Tracheophytes
- Clade: Angiosperms
- Clade: Eudicots
- Clade: Asterids
- Order: Lamiales
- Family: Orobanchaceae
- Genus: Orobanche
- Species: O. elatior

Binomial name
- Orobanche elatior Sutton

= Orobanche elatior =

Species of flowering plant

Orobanche elatior the knapweed broomrape is a species of flowering plant belonging to the family Orobanchaceae.

It is a parasitic plant that lives on knapweed. Its native range is Europe to China and Iran.
