= Orobanche minor =

Scientific classification
- Kingdom: Plantae
- Clade: Embryophytes
- Clade: Tracheophytes
- Clade: Spermatophytes
- Clade: Angiosperms
- Clade: Eudicots
- Clade: Asterids
- Order: Lamiales
- Family: Orobanchaceae
- Genus: Orobanche
- Species: O. minor

Binomial name
- Orobanche minor James Edward Smith

Species of flowering plant

Orobanche minor, the hellroot, common broomrape, lesser broomrape, small broomrape, broomrape minor or clover broomrape, is a holoparasitic flowering plant belonging to the family Orobanchaceae. It is one of about 150 non-photosynthetic plants in the genus Orobanche that parasitize autotrophic plants. It is a federally listed noxious weed in the United States.

== Characteristics and growth requirements ==
Orobanche minor grows to 0.5 m (1 ft 8 in) and is a perennial.

The flowers are hermaphrodite.

Common broomrape grows in a wide variety of soils, namely moist, light (sandy), medium (loamy) and heavy (clay) soils that are acid, neutral or basic. It can grow in semi-shade or in full sunlight.

The species appears in a wide range of colours from red-brown, yellow-brown to purple. Yellow specimens are also not uncommon and it is this extreme variability that makes identification on the basis of size or colour uncertain. It is parasitic on various members of the pea (Fabaceae) and daisy (Asteraceae) families. Although widespread, its appearance is sporadic; despite this, it can occur in vast colonies from time to time. The main flowering season in the northern hemisphere is from May until the end of August and from August to January in the southern hemisphere. The species has efficient seed dispersal and is largely inbreeding so that populations preferentially parasitizing a particular species which has its own clear ecological preferences may become effectively isolated and eventually may produce distinct taxa.

The plants are attached to their host by means of haustoria, which transfer nutrients from the host to the parasite. Only the hemiparasitic species possess an additional extensive root system. The root system is reduced as its function is mainly anchorage of the plant.

== Distribution ==
Common broomrape is one of the most widespread species. It is native to Southern Europe, but has been widely introduced elsewhere. It has been observed on clovers in the United States and flatweed in Canada. In New Zealand it is the only species of the genus present where it is regarded as an agricultural pest. In the United Kingdom it is widely recorded in southern England, less common in Wales, rarely recorded in lowland Scotland and absent from the Highlands and outer islands.

== Taxonomy ==
Phylogenetic analyses have placed this species in the taxonomically difficult Minores species complex. Four infraspecific taxa of Common broomrape are currently recognised in the United Kingdom: O. minor var. minor, O. minor var. flava, O. minor var. compositarum and O. minor subsp. maritima. Chromosome No.: 2n = 38. The genetic structure of populations of O. minor are under investigation using molecular markers and DNA sequencing to help resolve the taxonomic and nomenclatural problems that have historically been linked with this species.

== Hosts and speciation ==
The common broomrape is highly generalist in its host range, and can infect hundreds of species in families from the Ranunculaceae to the Poaceae (=Gramineae) but with a clear preference for the Fabaceae (=Leguminosae) and Asteraceae (=Compositae). However races occurring on different species of host are genetically divergent and physiologically adapted to their local hosts, and may therefore be in a state of incipient speciation. Urgent conservation efforts are required as the survival of some intraspecific taxa is very uncertain.
