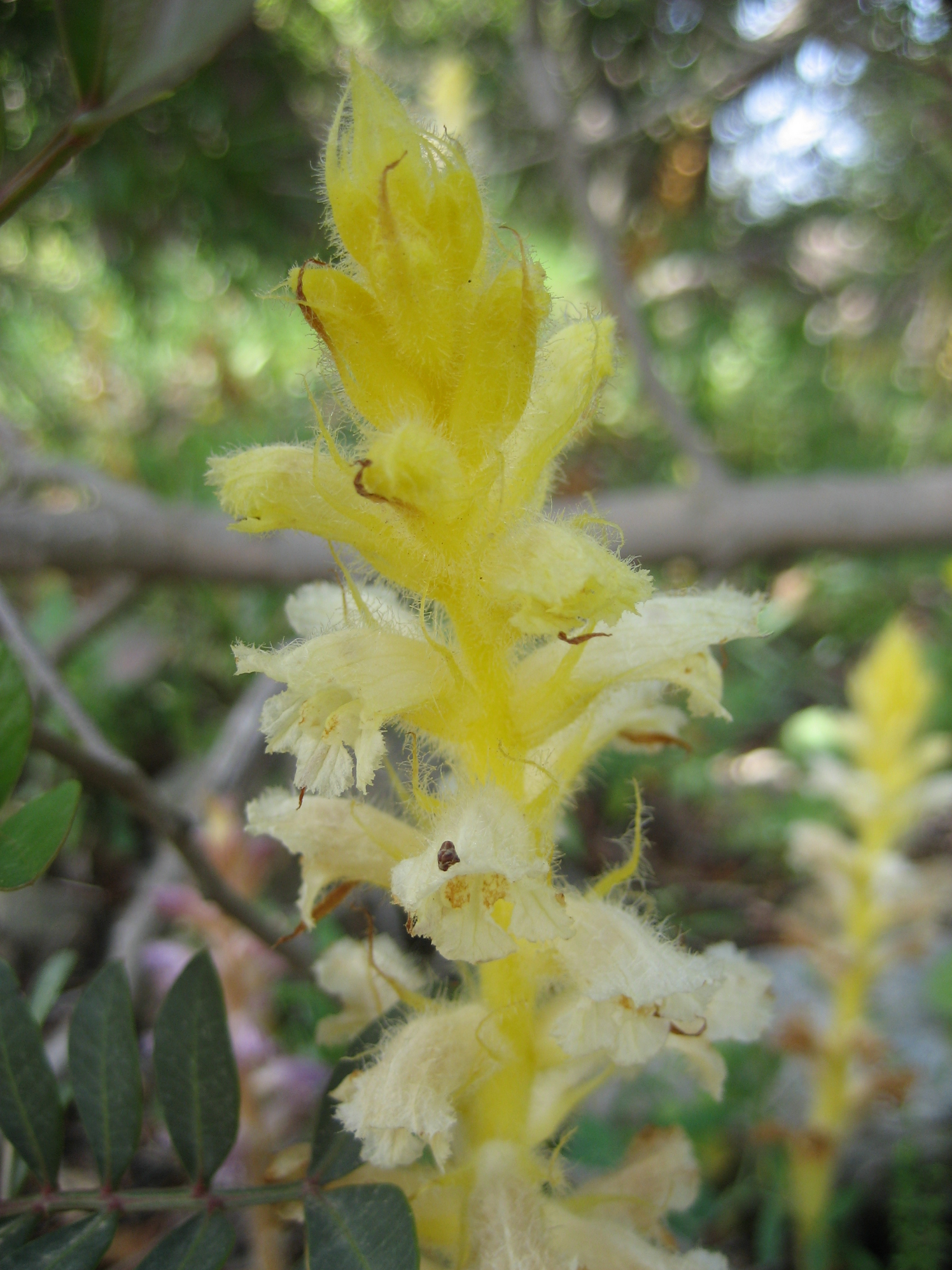

Scientific classification
- Kingdom: Plantae
- Clade: Tracheophytes
- Clade: Angiosperms
- Clade: Eudicots
- Clade: Asterids
- Order: Lamiales
- Family: Orobanchaceae
- Genus: Orobanche
- Species: O. pubescens

Binomial name
- Orobanche pubescens Dum.-Urville

Synonyms
- Orobanche versicolor

= Orobanche pubescens =

Species of plant

Orobanche pubescens is a species of annual herb in the family Orobanchaceae. They have a self-supporting growth form. Individuals can grow to 0.17 m.

== Sources ==
This article incorporates text from a free content work. Licensed under CC0 (license statement/permission). Text taken from Orobanche pubescens. Encyclopedia of Life.
