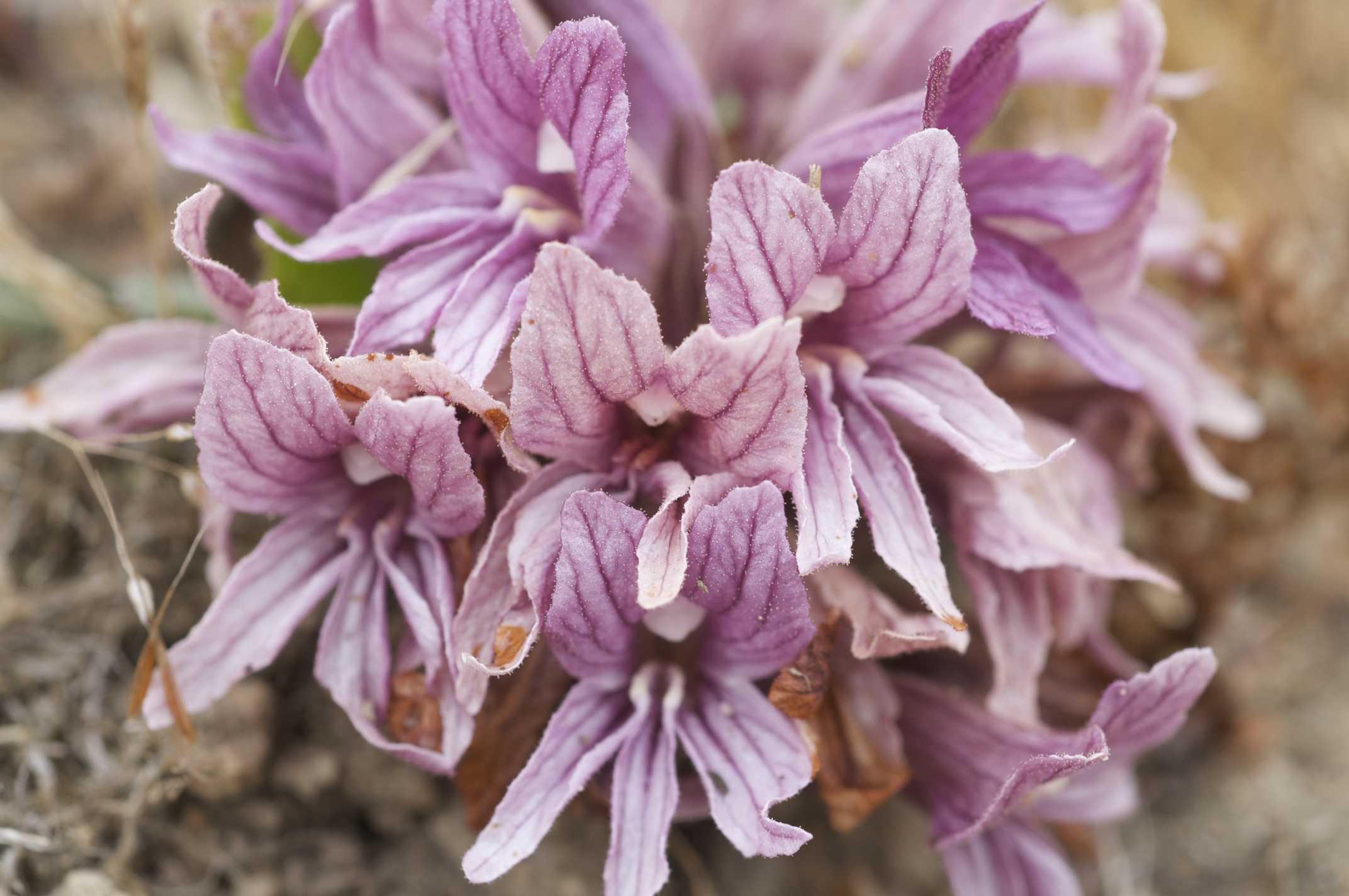
- Orobanche californica ssp. californica

Conservation status
- Apparently Secure (NatureServe)

Scientific classification
- Kingdom: Plantae
- Clade: Tracheophytes
- Clade: Angiosperms
- Clade: Eudicots
- Clade: Asterids
- Order: Lamiales
- Family: Orobanchaceae
- Genus: Orobanche
- Species: O. californica

Binomial name
- Orobanche californica Cham. & Schltdl.

Synonyms
- List: Aphyllon californicum (Cham. & Schltdl.) A.Gray; Myzorrhiza californica Rydb.; Myzorrhiza hutchinsoniana Davidson; Orobanche grayana var. nelsonii Munz; Orobanche grayana var. violacea (Eastw.) Munz; Phelypaea californica (Cham. & Schltdl.) G.Don; Phelypaea erianthera S.Watson

= Orobanche californica =

Species of flowering plant

Orobanche californica, known by the common name California broomrape, is a species of broomrape. It is a parasitic plant growing attached to the roots of other plants, usually members of the Asteraceae.

== Distribution ==
Orobanche californica is native to western North America from British Columbia and Idaho, through California and Nevada, to Baja California. It is found in many types of habitats. It has been noted to be associated with California goldenrod (Solidago californica) and sagebrush (Artemisia tridentata).

== Description ==
This plant arises from a thick root and grows erect to a maximum height near 35 centimetres (14 in), with one stem or a cluster of several. As a parasite taking its nutrients from a host plant, it lacks leaves and chlorophyll. It is light to dark purple in color and coated with glandular hairs.

The inflorescence is an elongated or branching array of several flowers. Each flower is tubular, up to 5 centimeters long, and pale pink, yellowish, or purple in color, sometimes with stark veining. The fruit is a capsule containing minute seeds.

=== Subspecies ===
There are several subspecies, which are sometimes difficult to differentiate. They include:

- Orobanche californica ssp. californica — native to coastal habitats, central California to B.C., parasitizes Grindelia
- Orobanche californica subsp. condensa — endemic to California, in the Southern California Coast Ranges and western Transverse Ranges.
- Orobanche californica ssp. feudgei — grows on chaparral plants, native to dry areas in Sierra Nevada and Transverse Ranges in California, and Peninsular Ranges in southern California and northern Baja California.
- Orobanche californica ssp. grandis — uncommon subspecies endemic to California, found in coastal areas of San Luis Obispo County and northern Santa Barbara County, and on Santa Rosa Island of the northern Channel Islands.
- Orobanche californica ssp. grayana — native to moist meadows/stream banks in the San Francisco Bay Area, northern Sierra Nevada, and Modoc Plateau; on Erigeron and Aster
- Orobanche californica ssp. jepsonii — Jepson's broomrape, Jepson's california broom rape, uncommon below 2,200 metres (7,200 ft), native from southern Sierra/San Joaquin Valley/ Santa Barbara County, north to Oregon border; found on assorted Asteraceae.

== Uses ==
The Paiute people of eastern California and the Great Basin used a decoction as a cold remedy and pulmonary aid.
