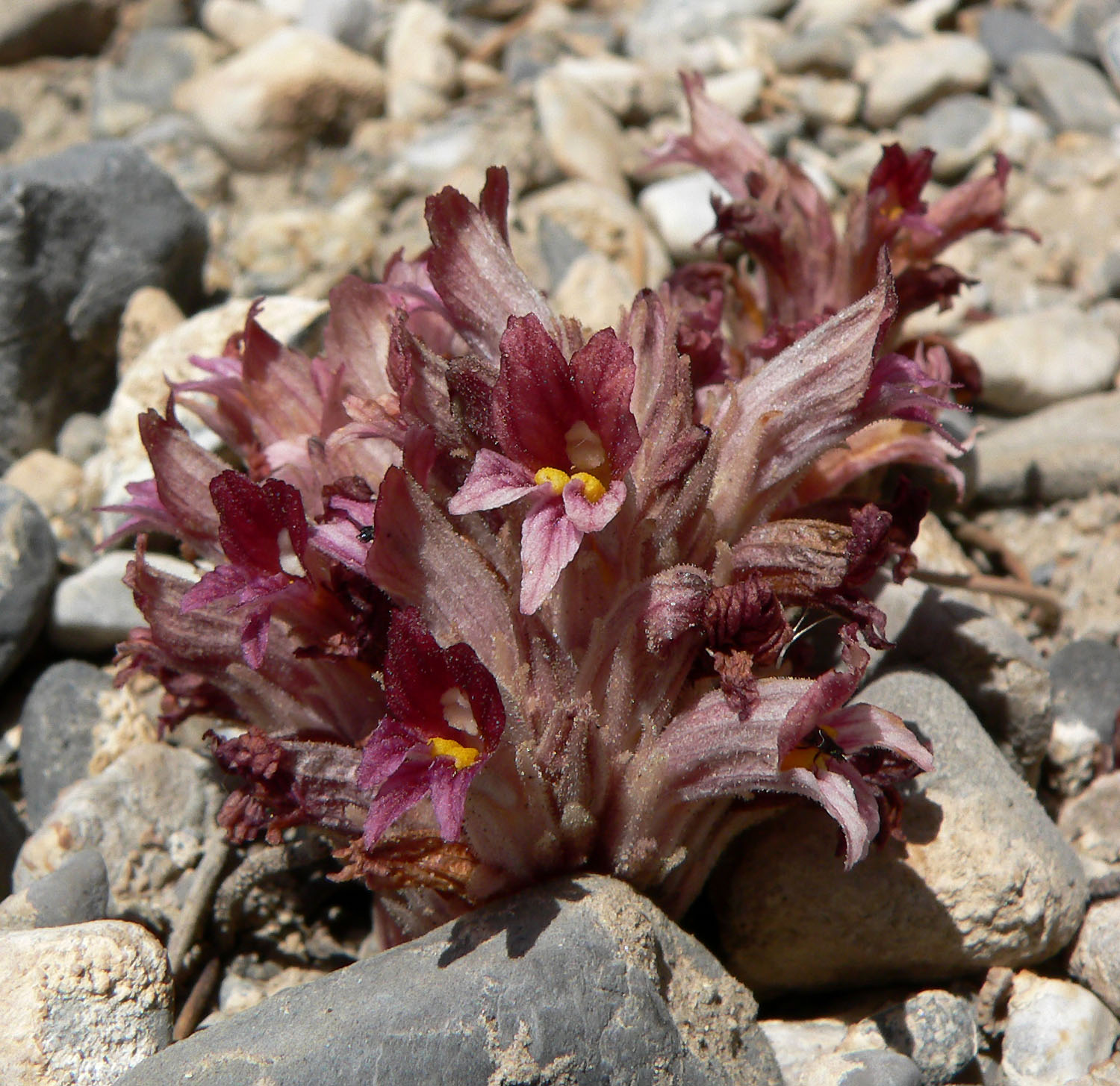

Conservation status
- Apparently Secure (NatureServe)

Scientific classification
- Kingdom: Plantae
- Clade: Tracheophytes
- Clade: Angiosperms
- Clade: Eudicots
- Clade: Asterids
- Order: Lamiales
- Family: Orobanchaceae
- Genus: Orobanche
- Species: O. corymbosa

Binomial name
- Orobanche corymbosa (Rydb.) Ferris

= Orobanche corymbosa =

Species of flowering plant

Orobanche corymbosa is a species of broomrape known by the common name flat-top broomrape. It is native to western North America where it is a parasite growing attached to the roots of other plants, usually sagebrush (Artemisia tridentata). It produces a cluster of thick, glandular stems with enlarged bases and stout roots, the hairy stems pale whitish or yellowish, often purple-tinged, and up to 17 centimetres (6.7 in) tall. As a parasite taking its nutrients from a host plant, it lacks leaves and chlorophyll. The inflorescence is a wide array of a few tubular flowers. Each is 2 centimetres (0.79 in) or 3 centimetres (1.2 in) long, coated in glandular hairs, and dark-veined pink or purple in color.
