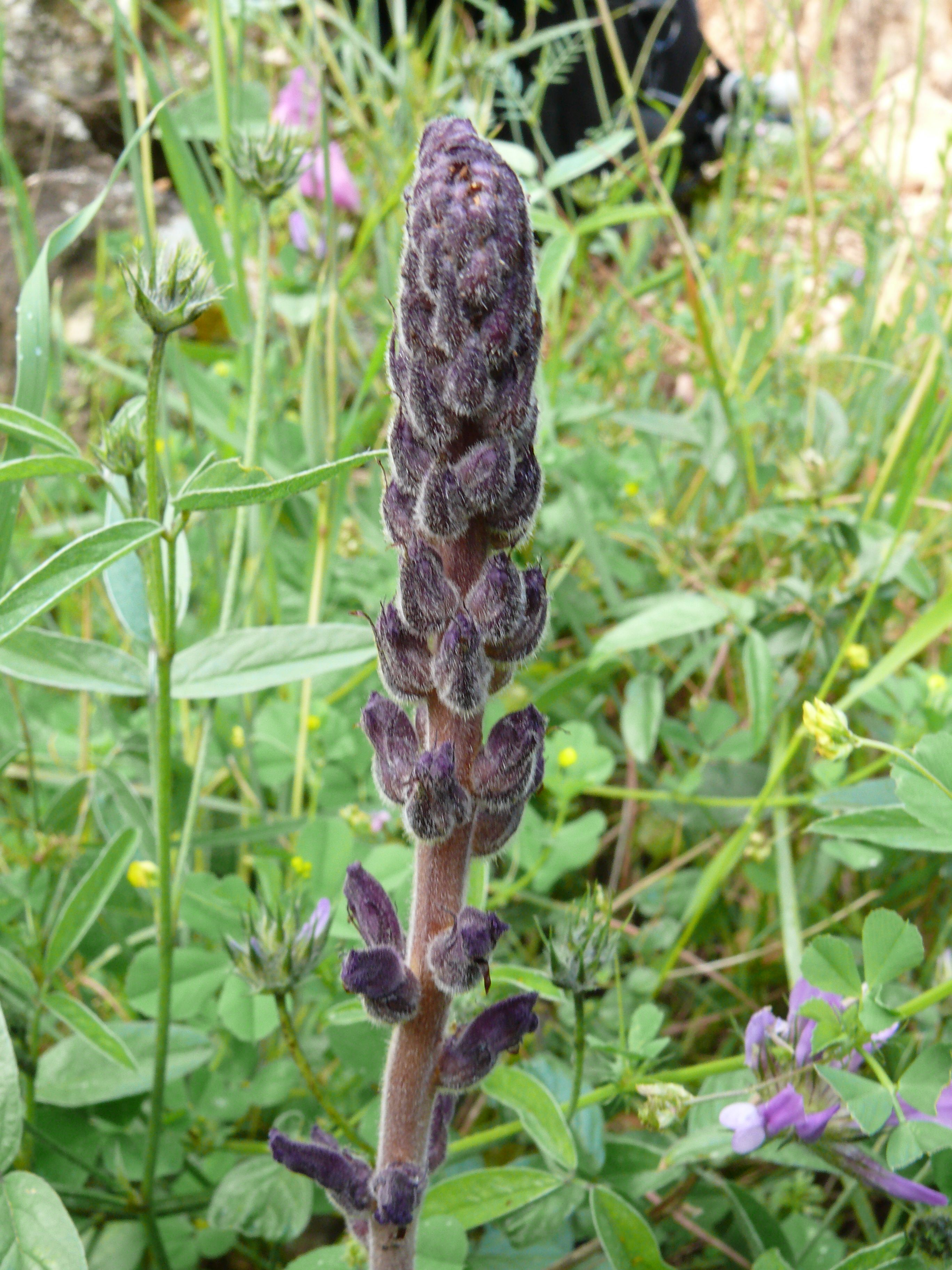

Scientific classification
- Kingdom: Plantae
- Clade: Tracheophytes
- Clade: Angiosperms
- Clade: Eudicots
- Clade: Asterids
- Order: Lamiales
- Family: Orobanchaceae
- Genus: Orobanche
- Species: O. lavandulacea

Binomial name
- Orobanche lavandulacea Rchb.

Synonyms
- Kopsia lavandulacea

= Orobanche lavandulacea =

Species of plant

Orobanche lavandulacea is a species of plant in the family Orobanchaceae.

== Sources ==
This article incorporates text from a free content work. Licensed under CC0 (license statement/permission). Text taken from Orobanche lavandulacea. Encyclopedia of Life.
