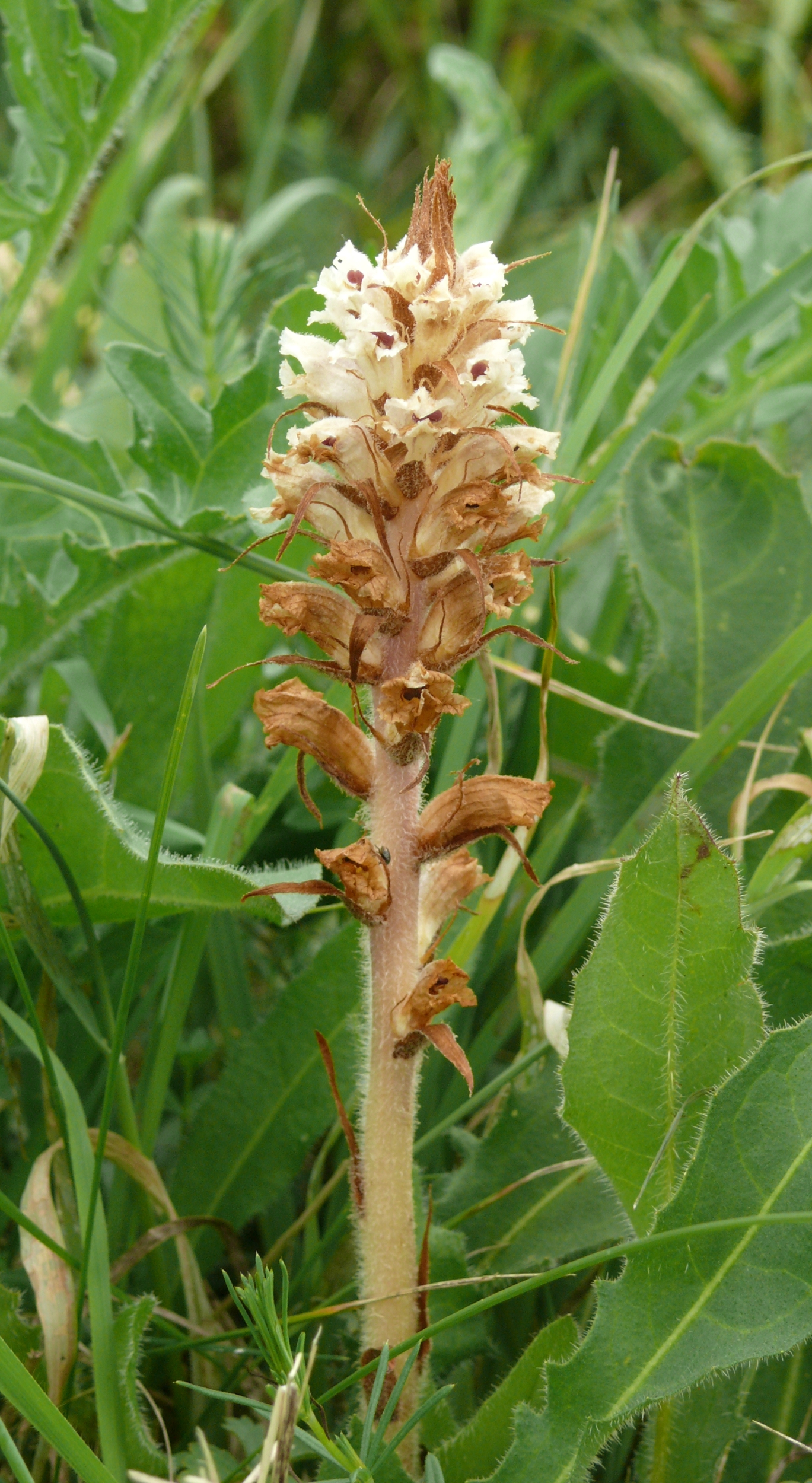

Scientific classification
- Kingdom: Plantae
- Clade: Tracheophytes
- Clade: Angiosperms
- Clade: Eudicots
- Clade: Asterids
- Order: Lamiales
- Family: Orobanchaceae
- Genus: Orobanche
- Species: O. picridis-hieracioidis

Binomial name
- Orobanche picridis-hieracioidis Holandre

Synonyms
- List: Orobanche alostensis De Moor ex T.Durand & Donckel.; Orobanche ambigua Moris; Orobanche artemisiae-campestris subsp. picridis (F.W.Schultz) O.Bolòs, Vigo, Masalles & Ninot; Orobanche euglossa Rchb.f.; Orobanche freynii Nyman; Orobanche hieracii-pilosellae F.W.Schultz; Orobanche karatavica Pavlov; Orobanche lilacina F.W.Schultz; Orobanche loricata var. picridis (F.W.Schultz) Bég.; Orobanche minor f. euglossa (Rchb.f.) Beck; Orobanche pallens F.W.Schultz; Orobanche pallida F.W.Schultz; Orobanche picridiphyta St.-Lag.; Orobanche picridis F.W.Schultz; Orobanche picridis var. pilosellae Rouy; Orobanche picridophya St.-Lag.; Orobanche reichardiae Freyn; Orobanche trachystigma Jess.; Phelipanche karatavica (Pavlov) Soják; Phelipanche pallens var. karatavica (Pavlov) Teryokhin

= Orobanche picridis-hieracioidis =

Species of plant

Orobanche picridis-hieracioidis is a species of plant in the family Orobanchaceae.
