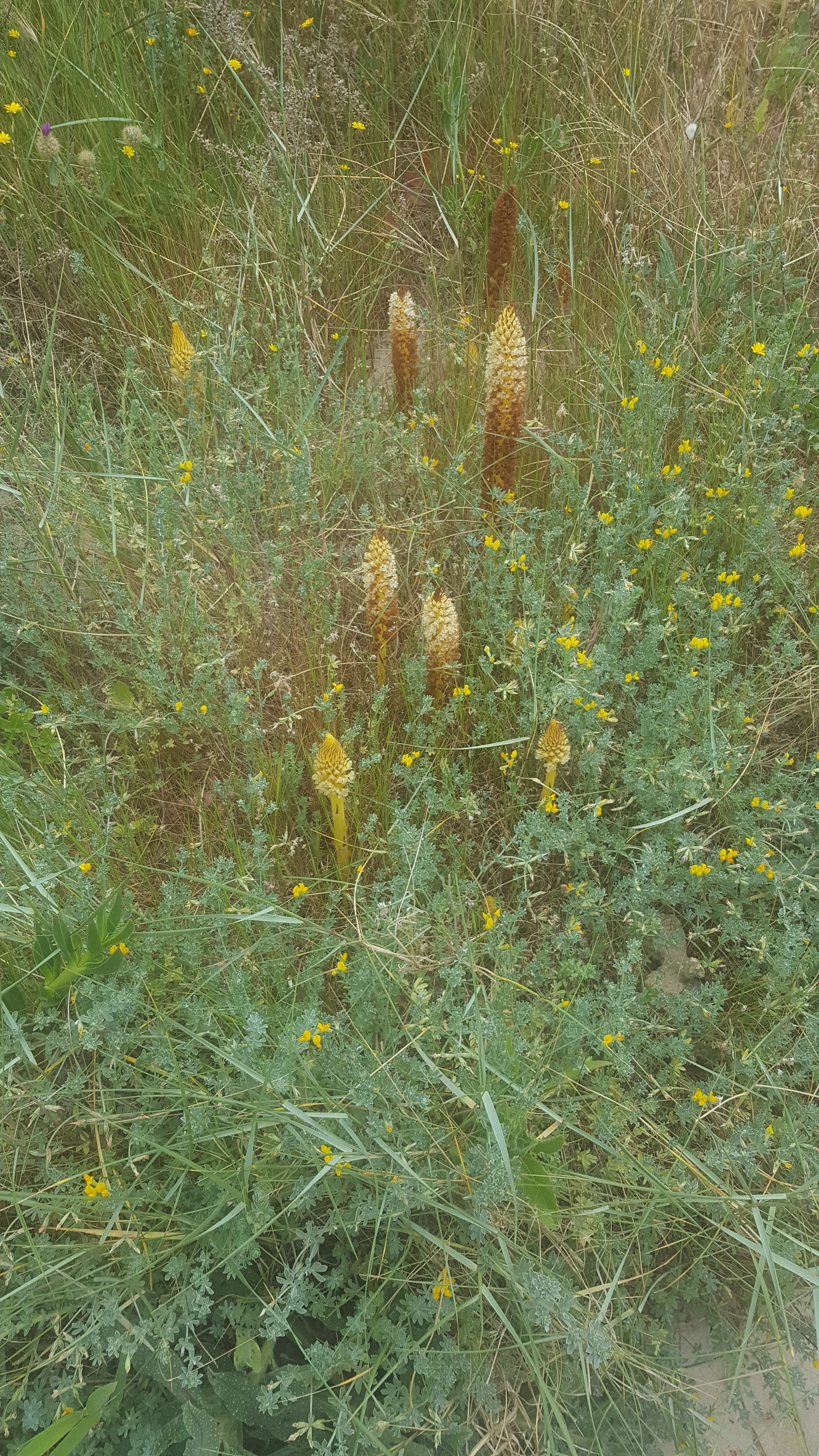

Scientific classification
- Kingdom: Plantae
- Clade: Tracheophytes
- Clade: Angiosperms
- Clade: Eudicots
- Clade: Asterids
- Order: Lamiales
- Family: Orobanchaceae
- Genus: Orobanche
- Species: O. densiflora

Binomial name
- Orobanche densiflora Salzm. ex Reuter

= Orobanche densiflora =

Species of plant

Orobanche densiflora is a species of plant in the family Orobanchaceae. O. densiflora f. melitensis was reputed to be endemic to Malta however such information is not corroborated by recent accounts.
