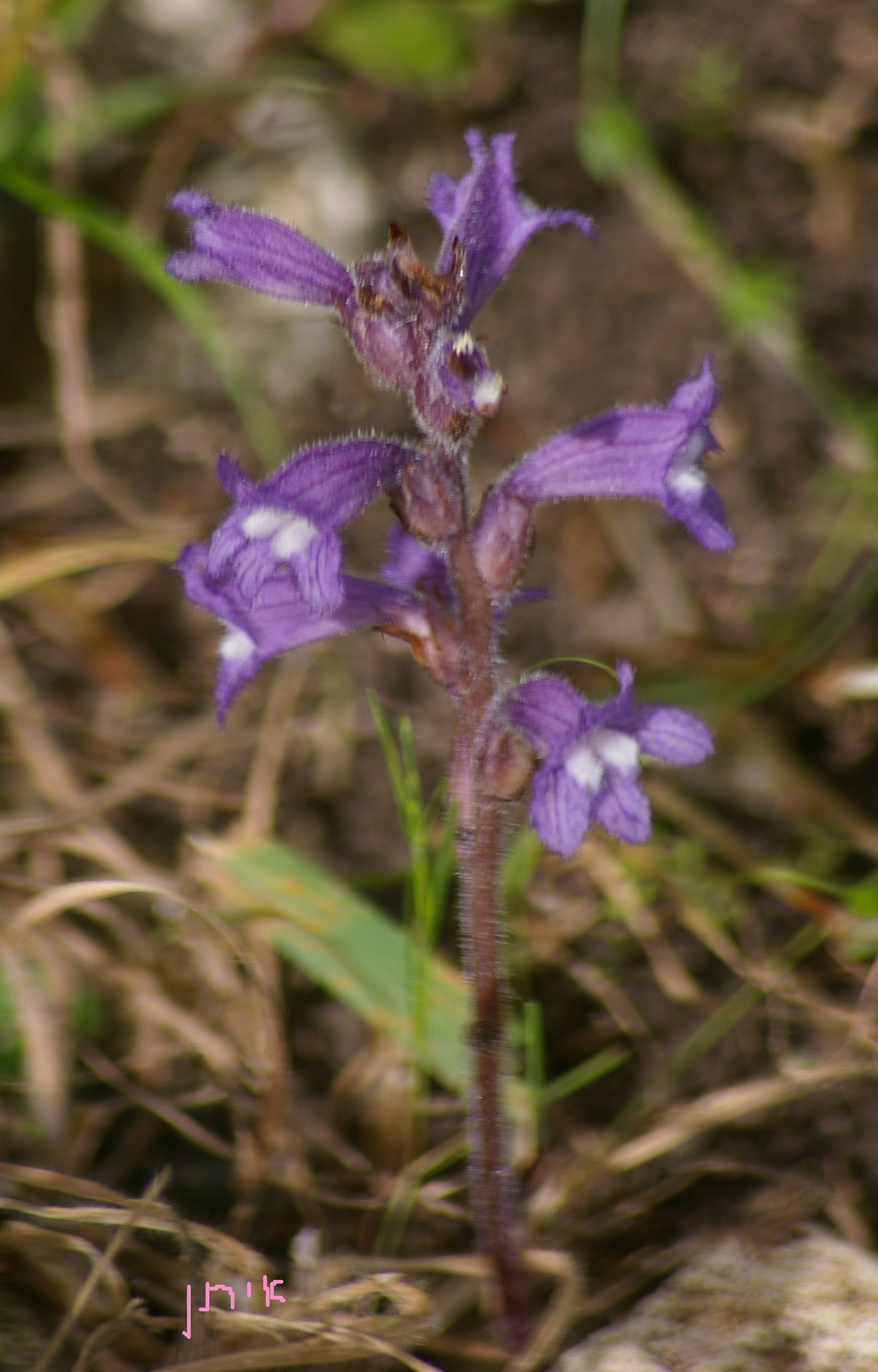

Scientific classification
- Kingdom: Plantae
- Clade: Tracheophytes
- Clade: Angiosperms
- Clade: Eudicots
- Clade: Asterids
- Order: Lamiales
- Family: Orobanchaceae
- Genus: Orobanche
- Species: O. aegyptiaca

Binomial name
- Orobanche aegyptiaca Pers.

Synonyms
- Phelipanche aegyptica

= Orobanche aegyptiaca =

Egyptian broomrape

Species of flowering plant

Orobanche aegyptiaca, the Egyptian broomrape, is a plant which is an obligate holoparasite from the family Orobanchaceae with a complex lifecycle. This parasite is most common in the Middle East and has a wide host range including many economically important crops.

Selective control of Egyptian broomrape is extremely difficult because the close association between host crop and parasite limits the use of most mechanical and herbicidal approaches.

== Disease cycle ==
A single Egyptian broomrape plant is capable of producing hundreds of thousands of extremely small (0.15–0.5 millimetres (1/128–5/256 in) long) seeds. These seeds, dispersed by the wind, animals, or by more artificial means such as farm machinery, survive in the soil and have the ability to remain viable in the soil for more than 15 years. When the seeds are dropped, they are dormant. They require after-ripening, or further ripening after the seed has fallen from the plant, which is completed by the time the dry season has ended. As the rainy season begins, the seeds imbibe water and move into a conditioning phase which lasts 1–3 weeks, depending on whether the temperature remains optimal, between 60 and 70 °F (16 and 21 °C). At this point, the seeds only need a chemical signal from the roots of a host plant to germinate. The seeds can remain in this conditioned state for several months. If the seed never receives the chemical signal to germinate and dries out, it returns to its dormant state, ready to be reconditioned when the next rainy season begins.

When a conditioned seed receives a chemical signal from a host plant, it germinates, forming a germ tube which grows toward the host. From this germ tube, it grows a haustorium, which is the part of the broomrape which attaches the parasite to the host and grows into the host's vascular system. The parasite is then able to draw out water and nutrients from its host. At this point, O. aegyptiaca grows rapidly, developing above-ground flower stalks. The flowers develop between February and May. A medium-sized plant can produce more than 400 flowers, which each produce around 500 seeds. The complete lifecycle of this parasite, if completed in one season, lasts 10 to 15 weeks.

== Hosts and symptoms ==
The host range for Egyptian broomrape is fairly wide, including many broadleaf vegetables, field crops, and some ornamentals. Tomato, potato, tobacco, eggplant, peppers, peas, carrot, celery, mustard, spinach, and chrysanthemum are among the susceptible plants. In areas such as southern Russia, melons are also potential hosts. Some plant species have been reported as being hosts for O. aegyptiaca that, in reality, are not hosts. Because the physical attachment of the parasite occurs below ground, checking that the plant's roots are connected to the weed is essential.

The most obvious sign of O. aegyptiaca parasitism is the visible parasitic plant near the base of the plant being attacked. Egyptian broomrape is a very short plant with purple flowers and a purple to brown stem. Plants that have been parasitized by this weed will show evidence of water stress, leaf yellowing, and stunted growth.

== Environment ==
Orobanche aegyptiaca is adapted to soils with a high pH, like those in the Middle East where it is native, and requires high temperatures for ideal germination and growth. Because O. aegyptiaca is an obligate parasite it is found only in association with the crops it attacks, especially irrigated crops.

== Management ==
Three main types of control exist for Orobanche aegyptiaca: chemical, cultural, and biological.

Chemical control can be achieved by soil fumigation with methyl bromide. This method is effective yet is rarely used because only a shallow layer of the soil is affected, it is a costly treatment, and methyl bromide poses environmental concerns. Another form of chemical control is soil solarization, which is a solar heating of the soil by placing clear polyethylene sheets over moist soil. This kills the majority of seeds that are viable and induces secondary dormancy in the rest. Lastly, sulfonylurea and imidazolinone herbicides have been shown in many studies to be an effective form of chemical control for O. aegyptiaca with the efficacy depending on the method of application, the species of crop, and the timing of the application. One study has shown application times between 14 and 42 days after planting to be ideal for controlling Egyptian broomrape.

Some forms of cultural control of O. aegyptiaca include sanitation efforts to help prevent the movement of seeds, individual picking of weeds by hand, and avoidance by changing the sowing time or not growing a host plant. Reducing spread of infected soil by farm machinery, avoidance of grazing on infected plants, and staying away from the use of hay produced from Orobanche-infested plants are all methods to help prevent the movement of seeds. The individual picking of weeds by hand is very important, as the plant is able to continue living as only a stem and produce a flower that can spread seeds even while not connected to the host. Any avoidance strategy must be carried out with a plant that cannot be parasitized by O. aegyptiaca and could take up to 20 years to complete, as this is how long the plant's seeds can remain viable in the soil. Also, because seeds can safely pass through an animal's digestive system, ensuring manure is not contaminated is important. Another option for cultural control is the use of trap crops or catch crops. Trap crops promote the germination of O. aegyptiaca seeds, but do not allow parasitism; these include flax, mung bean, maize, and sorghum. Catch crops allow parasitism, but are destroyed before the parasitic plants flower, so the broomrape seeds cannot be produced and dispersed. Finally, limited success has been seen with host plant resistance in sunflower, faba bean, lentil, and tomato. Resistant cultivars of sunflower were bred in Russia and Spain, but quickly lost their host-plant resistance due to selection towards more aggressive biotypes of the plant that had adapted to the new cultivars. In the resistant sunflower cultivars, germination was still induced, but the plant's germ tube never develops after penetration by the haustorium. Macromolecules are transferred from the host to the parasite, so one method for resistance is the introduction of an antimicrobial gene from the flesh fly into the host genome. This allows for its protein product to be transferred to the parasite and work as a means of control.

Most forms of biological control are still being developed and studied, although three species are potential forms of control: Fusarium oxysporum, F. solani, and Sclerotinia sclerotiorum. F. oxysporum has been shown to successfully control O. aegyptica in sunflower and tobacco, while S. sclerotiorum has been shown to cause wet rot in the plant without having any negative impact on the host. Field experiments carried out in Hungary showed promise for control with some F. solani isolates. The Fusarium species usually work through phytotoxins that help them to conquer O. aegyptica 's defenses and establish themselves.

Cohen et al. 2017 puts forward metrics which will be used to construct decision support systems. Such management decision metrics include especially field history, eco-informatics, geographic information systems (GIS), remote sensing mapping of the infestation, and information regarding neighboring plots.

== Importance ==
Because Egyptian broomrape can cause severe damage to economic crops and ornamentals, it is important to understand the plant as a parasite and to fully comprehend its life cycle. By understanding its lifecycle, management is possible.

In Israel, the production of processing tomatoes is in danger as a result of high crop yield losses due to heavy infestations of O. aegyptiaca. Approximately $1.3 to 2.6 billion have been lost in annual food crop losses in the regions near the Mediterranean, Northern Africa, and Asia. Egyptian broomrape and branched broomrape (O. ramosa) have infested an annual average of 2.6 million hectares of crops from the family Solanaceae, including tomatoes, potatoes, and eggplant.
