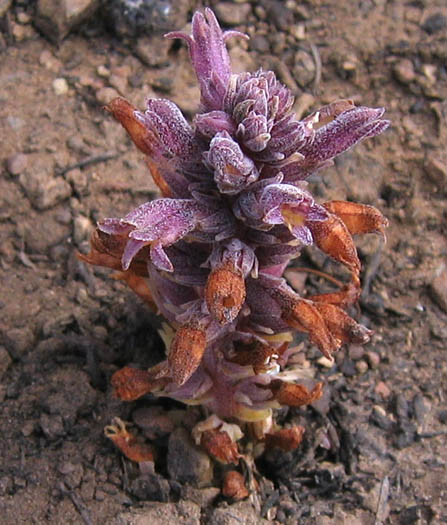

Conservation status
- Apparently Secure (NatureServe)

Scientific classification
- Kingdom: Plantae
- Clade: Tracheophytes
- Clade: Angiosperms
- Clade: Eudicots
- Clade: Asterids
- Order: Lamiales
- Family: Orobanchaceae
- Genus: Orobanche
- Species: O. bulbosa

Binomial name
- Orobanche bulbosa (A.Gray) G.Beck

Synonyms
- Aphyllon tuberosum Myzorrhiza tuberosa Phelipaea tuberosa

= Orobanche bulbosa =

Species of flowering plant

Orobanche bulbosa is a species of plant known by the common name chaparral broomrape.

It is native to the chaparral of California and Baja California. It is a holoparasite growing attached to the roots of shrubs, usually chamise.

== Description ==
Orobanche bulbosa arises from a thick root and a bulbous, twisted, scaly stem base, and grows erect to a maximum height near 30 centimetres (12 in). As a parasite taking its nutrients from a host plant, it lacks leaves and chlorophyll. It is dark purple to nearly black in color, with tiny whitish bumps bearing hairs.

The inflorescence is a dense spike-like or pyramid-shaped cluster of generally over 20 flowers. Each flower is tubular, between 1 and 2 centimetres (0.4 and 0.8 in) long, and yellow to purple in color.

The fruit is a capsule containing minute seeds.
