= Orobanche valida =

Conservation status
- Vulnerable (NatureServe)

Scientific classification
- Kingdom: Plantae
- Clade: Tracheophytes
- Clade: Angiosperms
- Clade: Eudicots
- Clade: Asterids
- Order: Lamiales
- Family: Orobanchaceae
- Genus: Orobanche
- Species: O. valida

Binomial name
- Orobanche valida Jeps.

Species of flowering plant

Orobanche valida is a species of broomrape known by the common name Rock Creek broomrape. It is endemic to California, where its two uncommon subspecies grow in mountainous habitats separated by several hundred miles. Howell's broomrape, ssp. howellii, is limited to the North Coast Ranges north of the San Francisco Bay Area, where it grows in chaparral, often on serpentine soils. The similarly rare subspecies valida is known from only four occurrences in the Transverse Ranges. The plant is a parasite growing attached to the roots of other plants, generally shrubs; ssp. howellii can often be found on Garrya species. The plant produces a hairy, glandular purple stem up to about 35 centimeters tall. As a parasite taking its nutrients from a host plant, it lacks leaves and chlorophyll. The inflorescence is a small cluster of tubular purple flowers 1 to 2 centimeters long.
