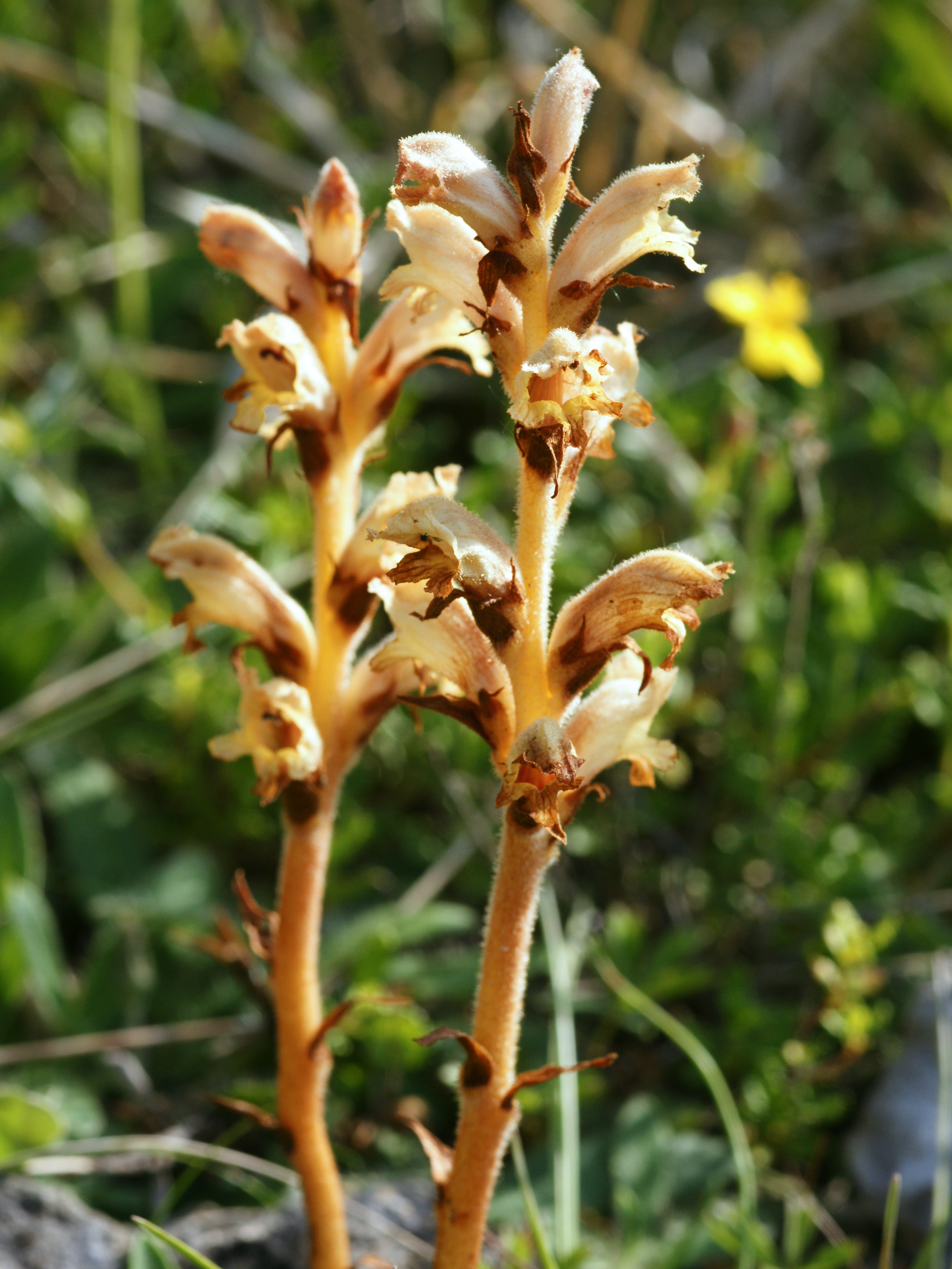

Scientific classification
- Kingdom: Plantae
- Clade: Embryophytes
- Clade: Tracheophytes
- Clade: Angiosperms
- Clade: Eudicots
- Clade: Asterids
- Order: Lamiales
- Family: Orobanchaceae
- Genus: Orobanche
- Species: O. teucrii

Binomial name
- Orobanche teucrii Holandre

Synonyms
- Catodiacrum rubidum Dulac; Orobanche atropurpurea F.W.Schultz; Orobanche atrorubens F.W.Schultz; Orobanche lazica Reut. ex Boiss.; Orobanche marginata Reut. ex Boiss.; Orobanche sideritidis Huter, Porta & Rigo; Orobanche teucrionepiphyta St.-Lag.; Orobanche teucriophya St.-Lag.

= Orobanche teucrii =

Species of flowering plant

Orobanche teucrii, commonly known as Germander broomrape, is a species of flowering plant in the family Orobanchaceae. It is an obligate parasite native to Europe, and was described in 1829.

== Taxonomy ==
The species was described by Jean Joseph Jacques Holandre in 1829.

== Distribution ==
Orobanche teucrii' is native to the temperate biome of Austria, Belgium, Bulgaria, Czechia, France, Germany, Greece, Hungary, Italy (including Sardinia), the north-west Balkan peninsula, Romania, Slovakia, Spain, Switzerland, and Ukraine.

== Description ==
Orobanche teucrii is an obligate parasite.

== Nomenclature ==
In English, Orobanche teucrii is commonly known as "germander broomrape".

In Croatian, the species is known as volovod. In Czech, it is known as záraza ožanková. In French, it is known as orobanche de la germandrée. In German, it is known as Gamandersommerwurz or Gamanderwürger. In Hungarian, it is known as gamandor-vajvirág. In Italian, the species is known as Orobanche del Teucrio, Succiamele, or succiamele del teucrio. In Slovak, it is known as záraza hrdobarková. In Slovene, it is known as vrednikov pojalnik.
