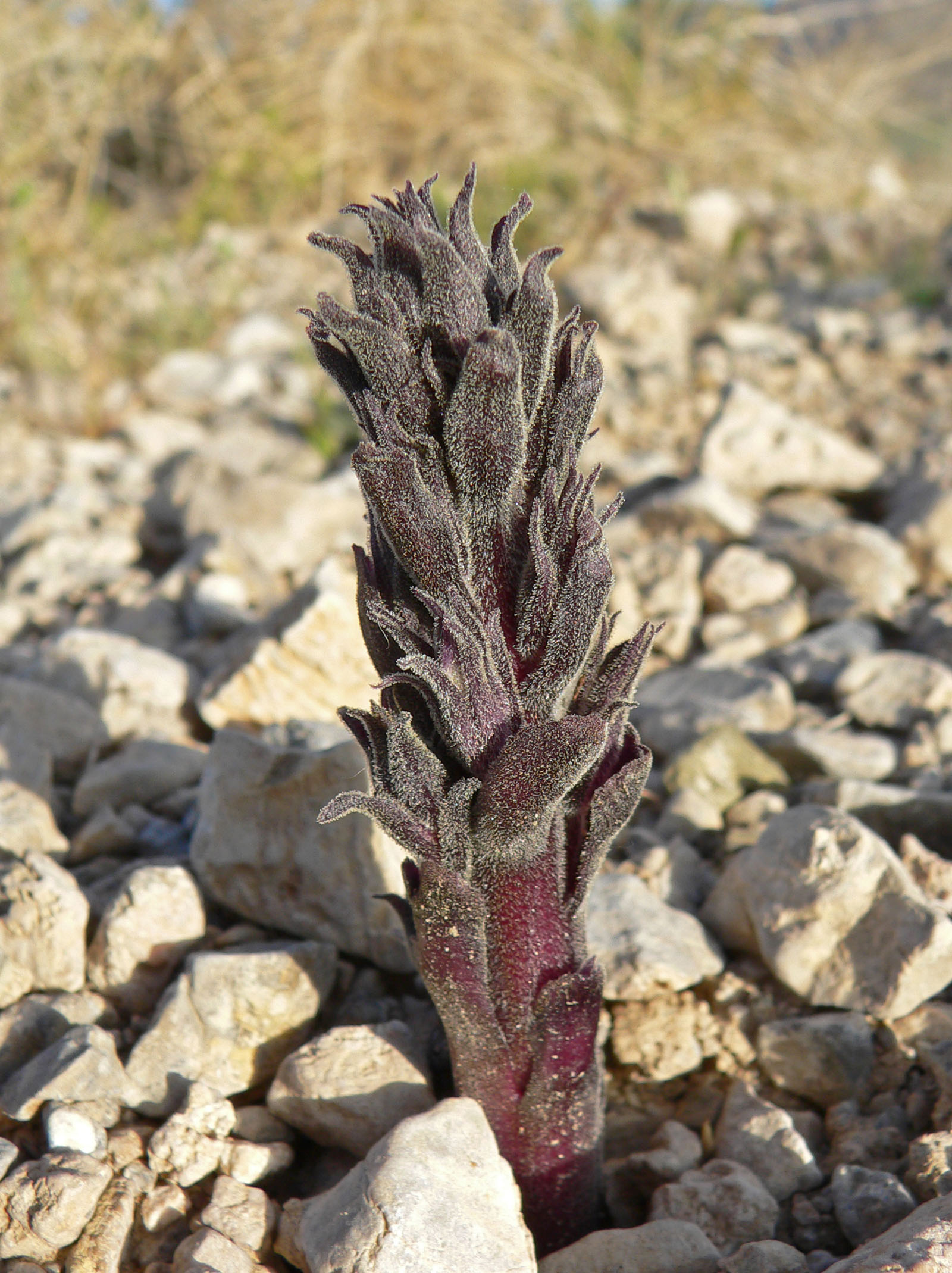

Conservation status
- Secure (NatureServe)

Scientific classification
- Kingdom: Plantae
- Clade: Tracheophytes
- Clade: Angiosperms
- Clade: Eudicots
- Clade: Asterids
- Order: Lamiales
- Family: Orobanchaceae
- Genus: Orobanche
- Species: O. cooperi

Binomial name
- Orobanche cooperi (A.Gray) A.Heller

Synonyms
- Aphyllon cooperi

= Orobanche cooperi =

Species of flowering plant

Orobanche cooperi is a species of broomrape known by the common name Cooper's broomrape desert broomrape, spike broomrape, and burroweed strangler. It is native to the desert regions of the southwestern United States and northern Mexico, where it is a parasite growing attached to the roots of other plants, usually members of the Asteraceae, such as Artemisia, Hymenoclea, Ambrosia and Encelia. Although not usually weedy, it has been found infesting agricultural cropland, including tomato fields in inland California. This plant arises from a thick root and a scaly, twisted stem base, and produces a thick, clumpy stem up to 40 centimeters tall. As a parasite taking its nutrients from a host plant, it lacks leaves and chlorophyll. It is dark purple in color and coated with glandular hairs. The inflorescence is an elongated array of several flowers. Each flower is tubular, purple and hairy, and up to about 3 centimeters long.

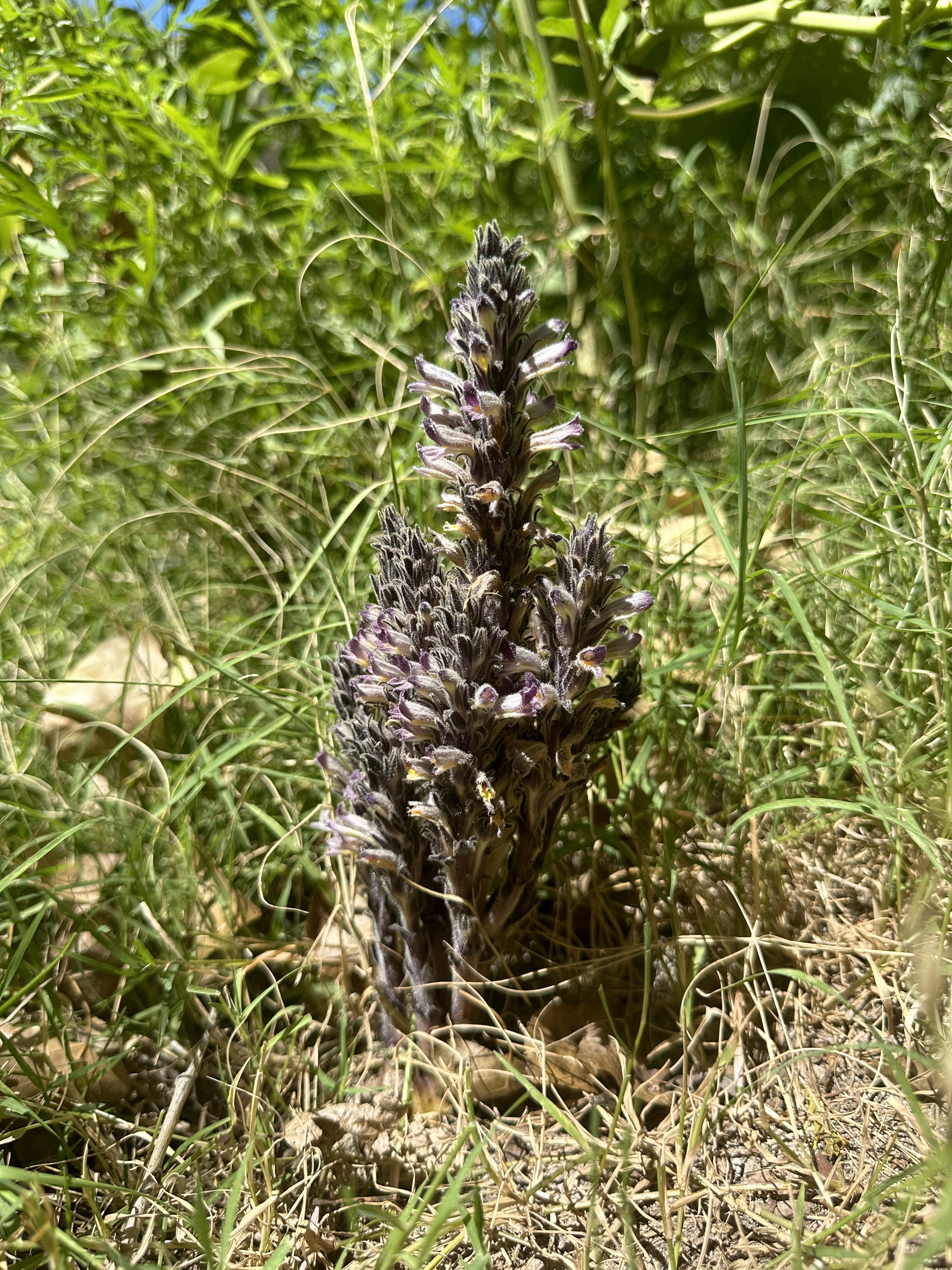
Mature blooming broomrape along the Verde River in Arizona.
