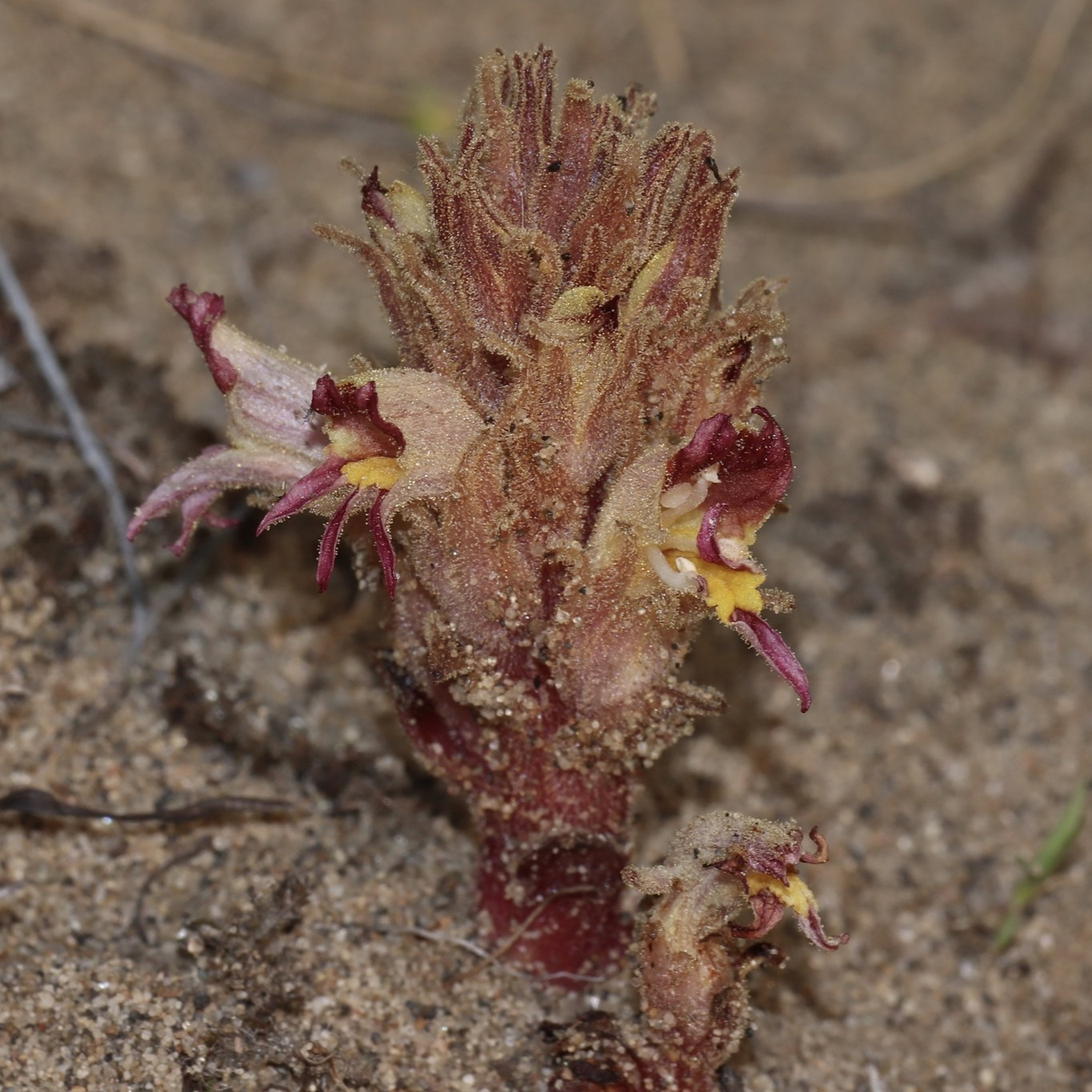
- In Dillberry Lake Provincial Park

Scientific classification
- Kingdom: Plantae
- Clade: Tracheophytes
- Clade: Angiosperms
- Clade: Eudicots
- Clade: Asterids
- Order: Lamiales
- Family: Orobanchaceae
- Genus: Orobanche
- Species: O. ludoviciana

Binomial name
- Orobanche ludoviciana Nutt.

Synonyms
- List: Aphyllon ludovicianum; Conopholis ludoviciana; Myzorrhiza ludoviciana; Orobanche ludoviciana var. genuina; Phelypaea ludoviciana

= Orobanche ludoviciana =

Plant species in the broomrape family

Orobanche ludoviciana, the Louisiana broomrape or prairie broom-rape, is a species of plant in the family Orobanchaceae. It was first described and named by Thomas Nuttall in 1818.

This species is parasitic on neighboring plants via its roots; common host species include gumweed and wormwoods, though some other Asteraceae are also used. They grow from 1-3 dm often without branches. Leaves are scales and numerous. The inflorescences are many-flowered spikes that occupy a half to a third of the shoot. Flowers sessile or with small up to 15mm pedicels for the lower flowers. Calyx subtended by 1 or 2 bracts, which are bilabiate. Corolla is 1.5-2.5 cm and often a violet-like color. 2n=24, 48, 72, 96. It typically grows in sandy soil. It grows throughout the central plains of North America and northwest into British Columbia and Oregon. Found from June through August.

== Taxonomy ==
Orobanche ludoviciana was given its scientific name by Thomas Nuttall in 1818. It is part of the genus Orobanche in the family Orobanchaceae. According to Plants of the World Online it has nine synonyms.

Table of Synonyms
Name	Year	Rank	Notes
Aphyllon arenosum Suksd.	1906	species	= het.
Aphyllon ludovicianum (Nutt.) A.Gray	1876	species	≡ hom.
Conopholis ludoviciana (Nutt.) A.Wood	1861	species	≡ hom.
Myzorrhiza ludoviciana (Nutt.) Rydb.	1903	species	≡ hom.
Orobanche ludoviciana f. albinea B.Boivin	1972	form	= het.
Orobanche ludoviciana var. arenosa (Suksd.) Cronquist	1959	variety	= het.
Orobanche ludoviciana var. genuina Beck	1890	variety	≡ hom., not validly publ.
Orobanche multiflora var. arenosa (Suksd.) Munz	1930	variety	= het.
Phelypaea ludoviciana (Nutt.) G.Don	1838	species	≡ hom.
Notes: ≡ homotypic synonym; = heterotypic synonym

=== Conservation ===
As of 2025 NatureServe has not evaluated Orobanche ludoviciana at the global level. It is presumed to be extirpated, locally extinct, in Iowa and possibly extirpated from West Virginia. It is rated as critically imperiled in Missouri and Wisconsin.
