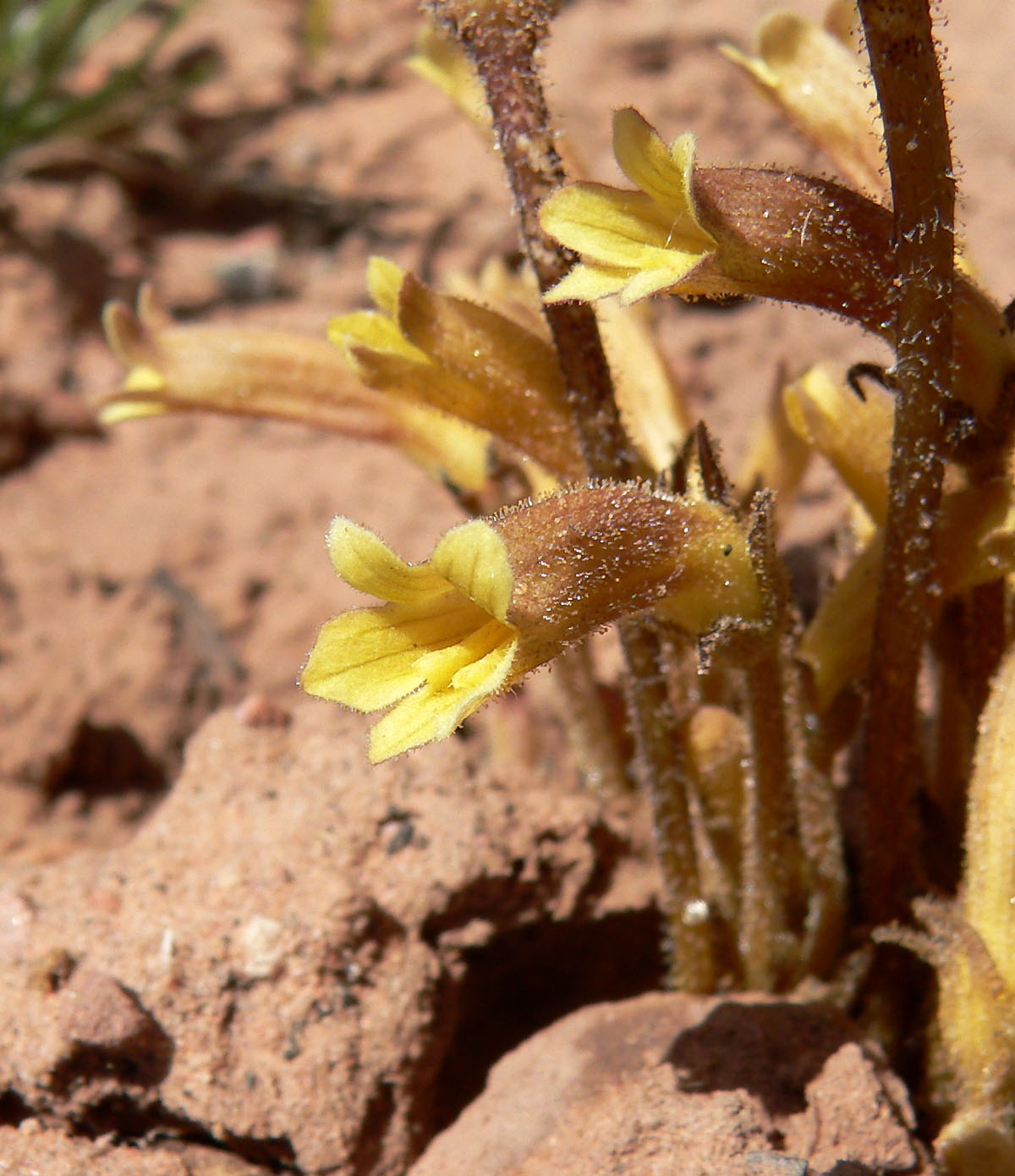

Conservation status
- Apparently Secure (NatureServe)

Scientific classification
- Kingdom: Plantae
- Clade: Tracheophytes
- Clade: Angiosperms
- Clade: Eudicots
- Clade: Asterids
- Order: Lamiales
- Family: Orobanchaceae
- Genus: Orobanche
- Species: O. fasciculata

Binomial name
- Orobanche fasciculata Nutt.

Varieties
- O. f. var. fasciculata; O. f. var. franciscana

Synonyms
- List: Anoplanthus fasciculatus; Anoplon fasciculatum; Aphyllon fasciculatum; Gymnocaulis fasciculata; Loxanthes fasciculata; Phelypaea fasciculata; Thalesia fasciculata

= Orobanche fasciculata =

Plant species in the broomrape family

Orobanche fasciculata is a species of broomrape known by the common name clustered broomrape. It is native to much of western and central North America from Alaska to northern Mexico to the Great Lakes region, where it grows in many types of habitat. It is a parasite growing attached to the roots of other plants, usually members of the Asteraceae such as Artemisia; and other genera such as Eriodictyon and Eriogonum. This plant produces one or more stems from a bulbous root, growing erect to a maximum of about 20 centimeters in height. The stems, leaves and five-lobed flowers are covered by sticky hairs. As a parasite taking its nutrients from a host plant, it lacks chlorophyll as well as a water-storage system. It is variable in color, often yellowish or purple. The inflorescence is a raceme of up to 20 flowers, each on a pedicel up to 15 centimetres (5 7/8 in) long. Each flower has a calyx of hairy triangular sepals and a tubular corolla 1.5–3 cm (5/8–1 1/8 in) long. The flower is yellowish or purplish in color.

== Taxonomy ==
Orobanche fasciculata was given its scientific name by Thomas Nuttall in 1818. It is classified in the genus Orobanche within the family Orobanchaceae. It has two varieties:

- Orobanche fasciculata var. fasciculata – From Alaska to Baja California, east to Ontario
- Orobanche fasciculata var. franciscana – Oregon and California

It has 17 synonyms of the species or one of its varieties.

Table of Synonyms
| Name | Year | Rank | Synonym of: | Notes |
|---|---|---|---|---|
| Anoplanthus fasciculatus (Nutt.) Walp. | 1844 | species | O. fasciculata | ≡ hom. |
| Anoplanthus luteus (A.Gray) Rydb. | 1932 | species | var. fasciculata | = het. |
| Anoplon fasciculatum (Nutt.) G.Don | 1838 | species | O. fasciculata | ≡ hom. |
| Aphyllon fasciculatum (Nutt.) Torr. & A.Gray | 1848 | species | O. fasciculata | ≡ hom. |
| Aphyllon fasciculatum var. luteum A.Gray | 1878 | variety | var. fasciculata | = het. |
| Aphyllon franciscanum (Achey) A.C.Schneid. | 2021 | species | var. franciscana | ≡ hom. |
| Gymnocaulis fasciculata (Nutt.) Nutt. | 1848 | species | O. fasciculata | ≡ hom. |
| Loxanthes fasciculata (Nutt.) Raf. | 1825 | species | O. fasciculata | ≡ hom. |
| Orobanche fasciculata var. lutea (A.Gray) Achey | 1933 | variety | var. fasciculata | = het. |
| Orobanche fasciculata f. lutea (A.Gray) Beck | 1930 | form | var. fasciculata | = het. |
| Orobanche fasciculata var. subulata Goodman | 1947 | variety | var. fasciculata | = het. |
| Orobanche fasciculata var. typica Achey | 1933 | variety | O. fasciculata | ≡ hom., not validly publ. |
| Phelypaea fasciculata (Nutt.) Spreng. | 1825 | species | O. fasciculata | ≡ hom. |
| Phelypaea lutea Parry | 1874 | species | var. fasciculata | = het., nom. illeg. |
| Thalesia fasciculata (Nutt.) Britton | 1894 | species | O. fasciculata | ≡ hom. |
| Thalesia fasciculata var. lutea (A.Gray) Britton | 1894 | variety | var. fasciculata | = het. |
| Thalesia lutea (A.Gray) Rydb. | 1909 | species | var. fasciculata | = het. |
Notes: ≡ homotypic synonym; = heterotypic synonym

== Uses ==
Among the Zuni people it is a traditional remedy for hemorrhoids. The whole plant was ground up using two stones and the powder inserted into the rectum.
