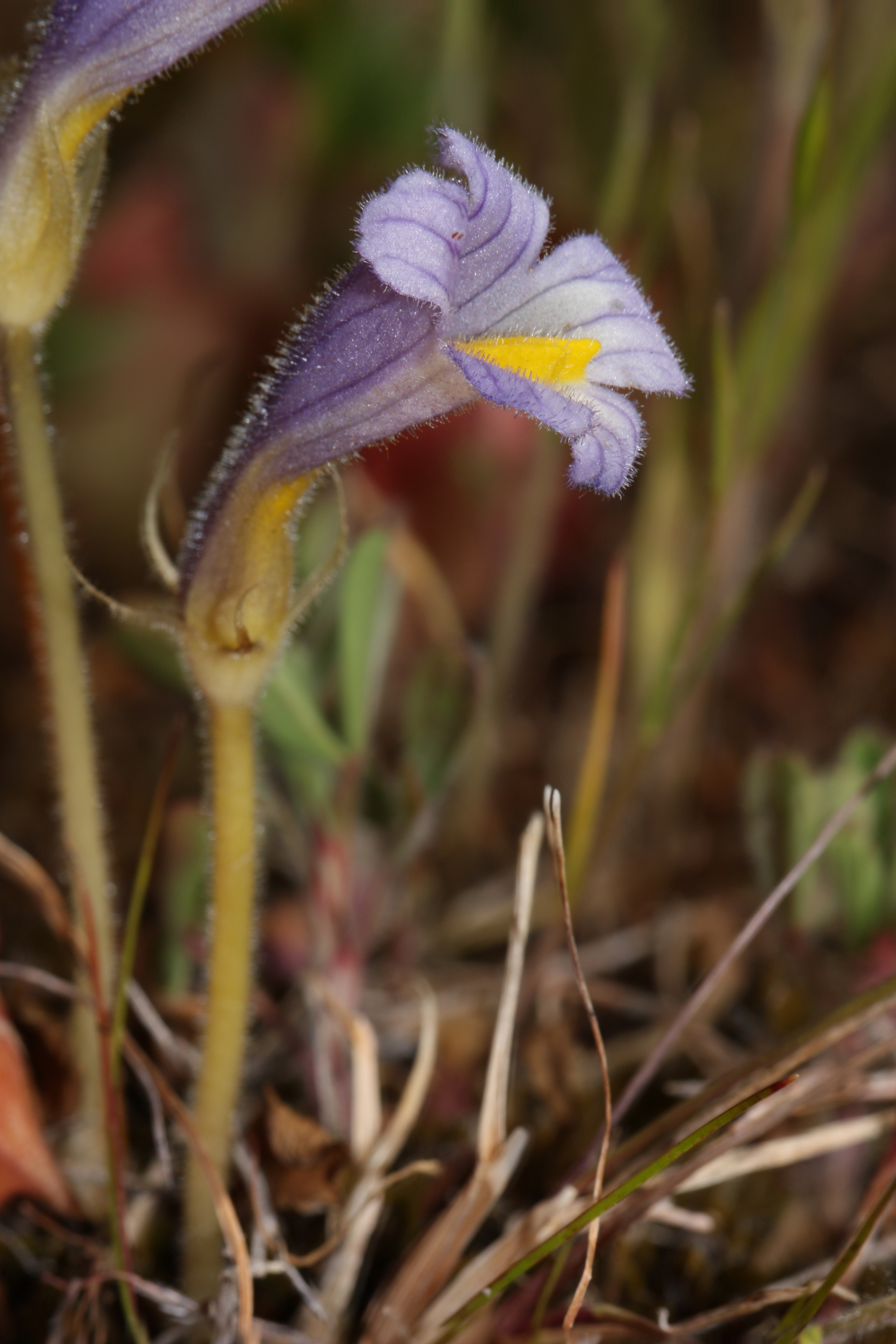
- Naked broomrape (Orobanche uniflora)

Scientific classification
- Kingdom: Plantae
- Clade: Tracheophytes
- Clade: Angiosperms
- Clade: Eudicots
- Clade: Asterids
- Order: Lamiales
- Family: Orobanchaceae
- Tribe: Orobancheae
- Genus: Orobanche; L.

Synonyms
- List: Aphyllon Mitch.; Boulardia F.W.Schultz; Catodiacrum Dulac; Ceratocalyx Coss.; Chorobanche C.Presl; Gymnocaulis Nutt.; Kopsia Dumort.; Loxanthes Raf.; Myzorrhiza Phil.; Necranthus Gilli; Orobanchella Piwow., M.Nobis & Madeja; Phelipanche Pomel; Platypholis Maxim.; Thalesia Raf. ex Britton

= Orobanche =

Broomrape

Genus of parasitic plants in the broomrape family

Orobanche, commonly known as broomrape, is a genus of almost 200 species of small parasitic herbaceous plants, mostly native to the temperate Northern Hemisphere. It is the type genus of the broomrape family Orobanchaceae. It is a weed on broadleaf crop plants in Australia, where some states enforce mandatory destruction and reporting, as well as prohibition of sale.

== Description ==
Broomrapes are generally small, only 10–60 centimetres (4–24 inches) tall depending on species. They are best recognized by the yellow- to straw-coloured stems completely lacking chlorophyll, bearing yellow, white, or blue snapdragon-like flowers. The flower shoots are scaly, with a dense terminal spike of 10-20 flowers in most species, although single in one-flowered broomrape (Orobanche uniflora). The leaves are merely triangular scales. The seeds are minute, tan or brown, blackening with age. These plants generally flower from late winter to late spring. When they are not flowering, no part of the plants is visible above the surface of the soil.

== Parasitism ==
As they have no chlorophyll, the broomrapes are totally dependent on other plants for nutrients. Broomrape seeds remain dormant in the soil, often for many years, until stimulated to germinate by certain compounds produced by living plant roots. Broomrape seedlings put out a root-like growth, which attaches to the roots of nearby hosts. Once attached to a host, the broomrape robs its host of water and nutrients.

Some species are only able to parasitise a single plant species, and they are often named after the plant they parasitise, such as ivy broomrape (O. hederae) being restricted to parasitising ivy. Others can infect several genera, such as the lesser broomrape O. minor, which lives on clover and other related Fabaceae.

Branched broomrape (Orobanche ramosa), native to central and southwestern Europe but widely naturalised elsewhere, is considered a major threat to crops in some areas. Plants that it targets are tomato, eggplant, potato, cabbage, coleus, bell pepper, sunflower, celery, and beans. In heavily infested areas, branched broomrape can cause total crop failure.

The bean broomrape (Orobanche crenata), which parasitizes the fava bean, has stems that are gathered and eaten in the Italian region of Apulia.

== Etymology ==
The generic name Orobanche comes from the Greek ὀροβάγχη (orobánkhē), from ὄροβος (órobos "bitter vetch") + ἄγχω (ánkhō (I) "strangle"). The common name "broomrape" comes from the English "broom" (a plant) + Latin rapum ('tuber').

== Species ==
The following species are recognised in the genus Orobanche:

- Orobanche aconiti-lycoctoni Moreno Mor., G.Gómez, Ó.Sánchez, Carlón & M.Laínz
- Orobanche aegyptiaca Pers. — Egyptian broomrape; Fenzhi broomrape
- Orobanche alba Stephan ex Willd. — Thyme broomrape; baihua broomrape
- Orobanche alsatica Kirschl. — Alsace broomrape; Duose broomrape
- Orobanche amethystea Thuill. — Eryngium broomrape
- Orobanche amoena C.A.Mey.
- Orobanche anatolica Boiss. & Reut.
- Orobanche androssovii Novopokr.
- Orobanche angustelaciniata Gilli
- Orobanche apuana Domina & Soldano
- Orobanche arenaria Borkh. — Wormwood broomrape
- Orobanche arizonica L.T.Collins
- Orobanche armena Tzvelev
- Orobanche arpica Piwow., Ó.Sánchez & Moreno Mor.
- Orobanche artemisiae-campestris Vaucher ex Gaudin
- Orobanche astragali Mouterde
- Orobanche auranitica Mouterde
- Orobanche australiana F.Muell.
- Orobanche australis Moris ex Bertol.
- Orobanche ballii (Maire) Domina
- Orobanche ballotae A.Pujadas
- Orobanche balsensis (J.A.Guim.) Carlón, M.Laínz, Moreno Mor. & Ó.Sánchez
- Orobanche bartlingii Griseb.
- Orobanche baumanniorum Greuter
- Orobanche beauverdii Uhlich & Rätzel
- Orobanche benkertii Rätzel & Uhlich
- Orobanche boninsimae (Maxim.) Tuyama
- Orobanche borissovae Novopokr.
- Orobanche brachypoda Novopokr.
- Orobanche brassicae (Novopokr.) Novopokr.
- Orobanche bulbosa Beck
- Orobanche bungeana Beck
- Orobanche caesia Rchb.
- Orobanche calendulae Pomel
- Orobanche californica Cham. & Schltdl.
- Orobanche campanulae Rätzel, Ristow & Uhlich
- Orobanche camphorosmae (Carlón, G.Gómez, M.Laínz, Moreno Mor., Ó.Sánchez & Schneew.) A.Pujadas & Triano
- Orobanche camptolepis Boiss. & Reut.
- Orobanche canescens C.Presl
- Orobanche caryophyllacea Sm. — Bedstraw broomrape; Simao broomstraw
- Orobanche castellana Reut.
- Orobanche cathae Deflers
- Orobanche caucasica Beck
- Orobanche centaurina Bertol.
- Orobanche cernua Loefl. — Nodding broomrape; Wanguan broomrape
- Orobanche chilensis (Phil.) Beck
- Orobanche chironii Lojac.
- Orobanche chrysacanthi Maire
- Orobanche cilicica Beck
- Orobanche cistanchoides Beck
- Orobanche clarkei Hook.f. — Xizang broomrape
- Orobanche clausonis Pomel
- Orobanche coelestis (Reut.) Boiss. & Reut. ex Beck — Changchi broomrape
- Orobanche coerulescens Stephan
- Orobanche cohenii Domina & Danin
- Orobanche connata K.Koch
- Orobanche cooperi (A.Gray) A.Heller — Cooper's broomrape
- Orobanche corymbosa (Rydb.) Ferris — Flat-top broomrape
- Orobanche crenata Forssk. — Bean broomrape
- Orobanche cumana Wallr.
- Orobanche cypria Reut. ex Kotschy
- Orobanche cyrenaica Beck ex E.A.Durand & Barratte
- Orobanche cyrnea Jeanm., Habashi & Manen
- Orobanche dalmatica (Beck) Tzvelev
- Orobanche daninii Domina & Raimondo
- Orobanche densiflora Salzm. ex Bertol.
- Orobanche denudata Moris
- Orobanche dhofarensis M.J.Y.Foley
- Orobanche ducellieri Maire
- Orobanche dugesii (S.Watson) Munz
- Orobanche ebuli Huter & Rigo
- Orobanche elatior Sutton — Knapweed broomrape; Duanchun broomrape
- Orobanche eriophora Bornm. & Gauba
- Orobanche esulae Pančić
- Orobanche fasciculata Nutt. — Cluster broomrape; fascicled broomrape
- Orobanche flava Mart. ex F.W.Schultz — Butterbur broomrape
- Orobanche foetida Poir.
- Orobanche fuscovinosa Maire
- Orobanche gamosepala Reut.
- Orobanche georgii-reuteri (Carlón, et al.) A.Pujadas
- Orobanche gigantea (Beck) Gontsch.
- Orobanche glabricaulis Tzvelev
- Orobanche gracilis Sm. — Slender broomrape
- Orobanche gratiosa (Webb & Berthel.) Linding.
- Orobanche grenieri F.W.Schultz
- Orobanche grisebachii Reut.
- Orobanche grossheimii Novopokr.
- Orobanche gussoneana (Lojac.) ined.
- Orobanche hadroantha Beck
- Orobanche haenseleri Reut.
- Orobanche hansii A.Kern.
- Orobanche hederae Duby – Ivy broomrape
- Orobanche hedypnoidis (Rätzel, Ristow & Uhlich) Hand
- Orobanche heldreichii (Reut.) Beck
- Orobanche hirtiflora (Reut.) Burkill
- Orobanche humbertii Maire
- Orobanche hymenocalyx Reut.
- Orobanche hypertomentosa M.J.Y.Foley
- Orobanche iammonensis A.Pujadas & P.Fraga
- Orobanche iberica (Beck) Tzvelev
- Orobanche inexspectata (Carlón, et al.) Domina, Greuter, P.Marino & P.Schäf.
- Orobanche ingens (Beck) Tzvelev
- Orobanche inulae Novopokr. & Abramov
- Orobanche javakhetica Piwow., Ó.Sánchez & Moreno Mor.
- Orobanche kashmirica C.B.Clarke ex Hook.f.
- Orobanche kelleri Novopokr. — Duanchi broomrape
- Orobanche kotschyi Reut. — Yitong broomrape
- Orobanche krylowii Beck — Siduomao broomrape
- Orobanche kurdica Boiss. & Hausskn.
- Orobanche lainzii (Gómez Nav., Roselló, Peris, A.Valdés & Sanchis) Triano & A.Pujadas
- Orobanche laserpitii-sileris Reut. ex Jord.
- Orobanche latisquama (F.W.Schultz) Batt.
- Orobanche lavandulacea Rchb.
- Orobanche laxissima Uhlich & Rätzel
- Orobanche leptantha Pomel
- Orobanche libanotica (Schweinf. ex Boiss.) Dinsm.
- Orobanche litorea Guss.
- Orobanche longibracteata Schiman-Czeika
- Orobanche loscosii Carlón, M.Laínz, Moreno Mor. & Ó.Sánchez
- Orobanche lucorum A.Braun ex F.W.Schultz — Barberry Broomrape
- Orobanche ludoviciana Nutt. — Prairie broomrape; desert broomrape
- Orobanche lutea Baumg. — Medick broomrape
- Orobanche lycoctoni Rhiner
- Orobanche megalantha Harry Sm. — Dahua broomrape
- Orobanche minor Sm. — Common broomrape; clover broomrape; lesser broomrape; small broomrape
- Orobanche mlokosiewiczii Piwow., Ó.Sánchez & Moreno Mor.
- Orobanche mongolica Beck — Zhonghua broomrape
- Orobanche montserratii A.Pujadas & D.Gómez
- Orobanche multiflora Nutt.
- Orobanche mupinensis Hu — Baoxing broomrape
- Orobanche muteliformis M.J.Y.Foley
- Orobanche mutelii F.W.Schultz
- Orobanche nana Noë ex Rchb.
- Orobanche nowackiana Markgr.
- Orobanche olbiensis (Coss.) Nyman
- Orobanche ombrochares Hance — Maoyao broomrape
- Orobanche orientalis Beck
- Orobanche owerinii (Beck) Beck
- Orobanche oxyloba (Reut.) Beck
- Orobanche palaestina Reut.
- Orobanche pancicii Beck
- Orobanche parishii (Jeps.) Heckard
- Orobanche penduliflora Gilli
- Orobanche perangustata M.J.Y.Foley
- Orobanche persica (Beck) Novopokr.
- Orobanche picridis-hieracioidis Holandre — Oxtongue broomrape
- Orobanche pinorum Geyer ex Hook.
- Orobanche portoilicitana A.Pujadas & M.B.Crespo
- Orobanche psila C.B.Clarke
- Orobanche pubescens d'Urv. — Hairy broomrape
- Orobanche pulchella (C.A.Mey.) Novopokr.
- Orobanche purpurea Jacq. — Yarrow broomrape
- Orobanche pycnostachya Hance — Huanghua broomrape
- Orobanche ramosa L. — Branched broomrape; hemp broomrape
- Orobanche rapum-genistae Thuill. — Greater broomrape
- Orobanche rechingeri Gilli
- Orobanche resedarum (Carlón, et al.) A.Pujadas & Triano
- Orobanche reticulata Wallr. — Thistle broomrape
- Orobanche reuteriana (Rchb.f.) M.B.Crespo & A.Pujadas
- Orobanche rigens Loisel.
- Orobanche riparia L.T.Collins
- Orobanche robbinsii Heckard ex Colwell & Yatsk.
- Orobanche rosmarina Welw. ex Beck
- Orobanche salviae F.W.Schultz ex W.D.J.Koch
- Orobanche sanguinea C.Presl
- Orobanche santolinae Loscos & J.Pardo
- Orobanche schelkovnikovii Tzvelev
- Orobanche schultzii Mutel
- Orobanche schweinfurthii Beck
- Orobanche septemloba (Beck) Tzvelev
- Orobanche serbica Beck & Petrovič
- Orobanche serratocalyx Beck
- Orobanche sinensis Harry Sm. — Sichuan broomrape
- Orobanche singarensis Beck
- Orobanche sintenisii Beck
- Orobanche solenanthi Novopokr. & Pissjauk.
- Orobanche sordida C.A.Mey. — Danhuang broomrape
- Orobanche spectabilis Reut.
- Orobanche staehelinae D.Pav., Michaud, Véla & J.-M.Tison
- Orobanche stocksii Boiss.
- Orobanche subbaetica Triano & A.Pujadas
- Orobanche sulphurea Gontsch.
- Orobanche tacnaensis Mattf.
- Orobanche tarapacana Phil.
- Orobanche tetuanensis Ball
- Orobanche teucrii Holandre — Germander broomrape
- Orobanche transcaucasica Tzvelev
- Orobanche trichocalyx (Webb & Berthel.) Beck
- Orobanche tricholoba (Reut.) Domina
- Orobanche turcica G.Zare & Dönmez
- Orobanche uniflora L. — Naked broomrape; one-flower cancer-root
- Orobanche uralensis Beck — Duochi broomrape
- Orobanche valida Jeps.
- Orobanche vallicola (Jeps.) Heckard
- Orobanche variegata Wallr.
- Orobanche weberbaueri Mattf.
- Orobanche yuennanensis (Beck) Hand.-Mazz. — Dianlie Broomrape
- Orobanche zajaciorum Piwow.
- Orobanche zosimii (M.J.Y.Foley) Domina
