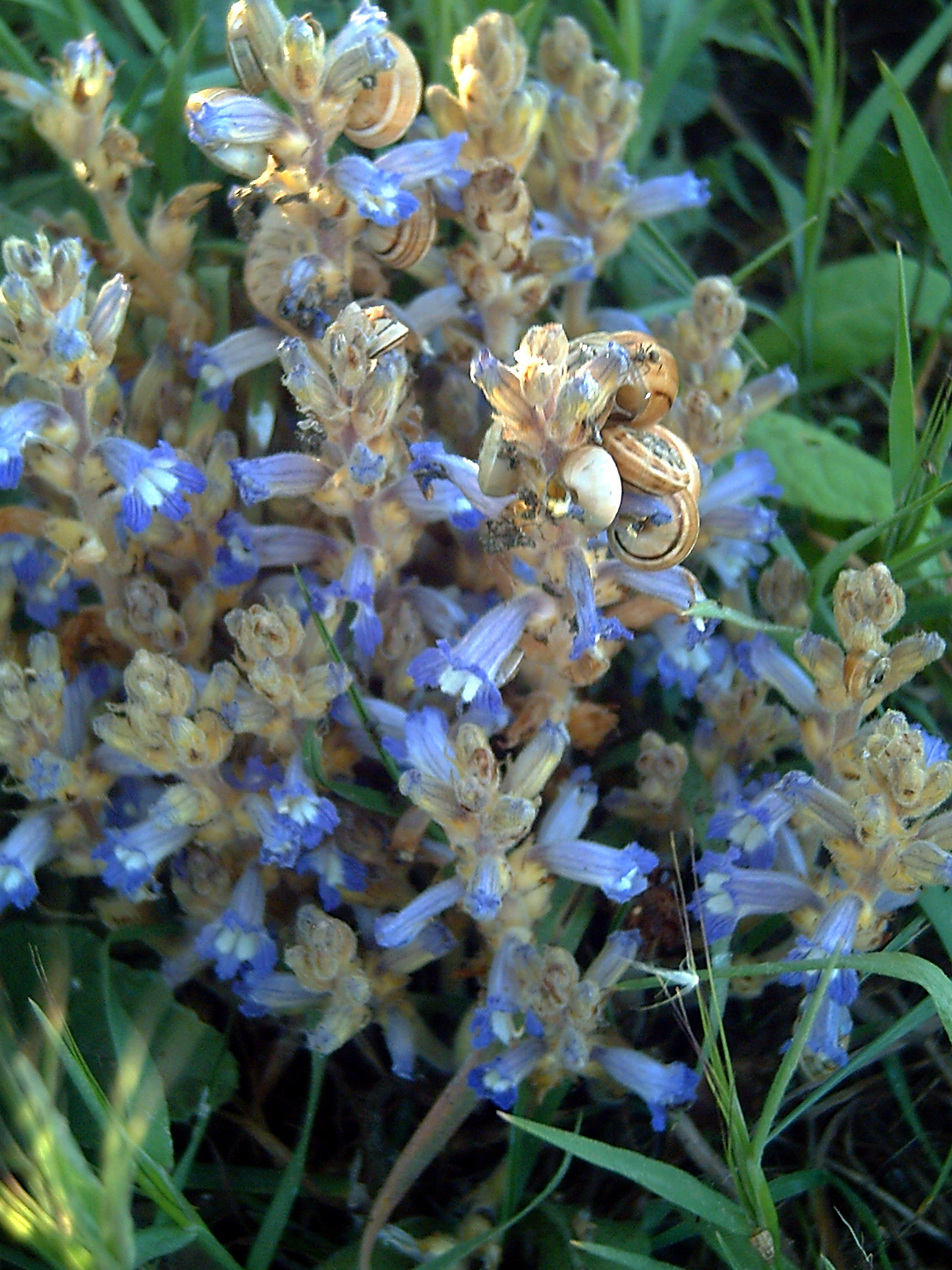

Scientific classification
- Kingdom: Plantae
- Clade: Tracheophytes
- Clade: Angiosperms
- Clade: Eudicots
- Clade: Asterids
- Order: Lamiales
- Family: Orobanchaceae
- Genus: Orobanche
- Species: O. ramosa

Binomial name
- Orobanche ramosa L.

Synonyms
- List: Kopsia ramosa (L.) Dumort.; Phelipanche ramosa (L.) Pomel; Phelypaea ramosa (L.) C.A.Mey.; Kopsia ramosa f. polyclonos (Wallr.) Bég.; Lathraea phelypea Forssk.; Orobanche albiflora Gren. & Godr.; Orobanche cannabios F.W.Schultz; Orobanche cannabis Vaucher; Orobanche commutata Zumagl.; Orobanche micrantha Wallr.; Orobanche monoclonos Beck; Orobanche ramosa var. monoclonos (Wallr.) Delip.; Orobanche ramosa var. polyclonos Wallr.; Phelypaea aegyptiaca Hook.f. & Thomson in; Phelypaea albiflora Gren. & Godr.; Phelypaea emarginata Reut.; Phelypaea ramosa var. monoclonos Wallr.; Phelypaea ramosissima Gennari; Phelypaea reuteri Moris

= Orobanche ramosa =

Species of flowering plant

Orobanche ramosa is a species of broomrape known by the common names hemp broomrape and branched broomrape. It is native to Eurasia and North Africa, but it is known in many other places as an introduced species and sometimes a noxious weed.

It is a pest in agricultural fields, infesting crops including tobacco, potato, and tomato.

The plant produces many slender, erect stems from a thick root. The yellowish stems grow 10 to 60 centimeters tall and are coated in glandular hairs. The broomrape is parasitic on other plants, draining nutrients from their roots, and it lacks leaves and chlorophyll. The inflorescence bears several flowers, each in a yellowish calyx of sepals and with a tubular white and blue to purple corolla.
