= Orobanche cernua =

Scientific classification
- Kingdom: Plantae
- Clade: Tracheophytes
- Clade: Angiosperms
- Clade: Eudicots
- Clade: Asterids
- Order: Lamiales
- Family: Orobanchaceae
- Genus: Orobanche
- Species: O. cernua

Binomial name
- Orobanche cernua Loefl.

Species of plant

Orobanche cernua, commonly known as nodding broomrape, is a species of herb in the family Orobanchaceae. They have a self-supporting growth form and simple, broad leaves. Individuals can grow to 0.4 m. Holoparasite of Artemisia spp. Distribution: Europe, SW Asia, Russia, Kazakhstan, Turkmenistan,

Uzbekistan Kyrgyzstan, Tajikistan, Afghanistan, Pakistan, N India, Nepal, China (Gansu, Hebei, Jilin, Nei Mongol, Qinghai, Shaanxi, Shanxi, Sichuan, Xinjiang, Xizang), Mongolia.

== Sources ==
This article incorporates text from a free content work. Licensed under CC0 (license statement/permission). Text taken from Orobanche cernua. Encyclopedia of Life.
