= Hazelwood, County Sligo =

Woodland in County Sligo, Ireland

Coordinates: 54.26°N 8.43°W

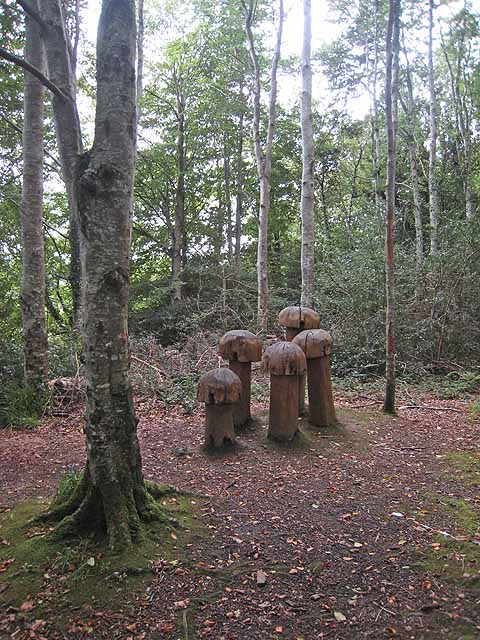
Toadstool sculpture, Hazelwood Demesne

Hazelwood (Irish: Coill an Eanaigh) is an ancient area of woodland located just over 2 miles (3.2 km) outside the town of Sligo in northwest Ireland, in the parish of Calry. It is the setting for W.B.Yeats's The Song of Wandering Aengus. The wood is situated on the shores of Lough Gill, which contains Yeats's Lake Isle of Innisfree, and is popular for its scenic walks, which are dotted with sculptures. Swans, mallards and gulls congregate at the picnic area, and there is fishing on Lough Gill. The wood is part of the Hazelwood estate, owned by the Wynne family for two hundred years. The walk along forests trails provides views of the lake and Church Island, Cottage Island and Goat Island.

The woods are dominated by oaks (Quercus spp.), with rowan (Sorbus aucuparia), willows (Salix spp.), bird cherry (Prunus padus), yew (Taxus baccata), and the rare rock whitebeam (Sorbus rupicola). The shores of the lake are home to the world's northernmost specimens of the rare Mediterranean strawberry tree (Arbutus unedo). This area supports several rare plant species, including yellow bird's-nest (Monotropa hypopitys), lady’s mantle (Alchemilla glaucescens), ivy broomrape (Orobanche hederae), black bryony (Dioscorea communis), intermediate wintergreen (Pyrola media) and bird's-nest orchid (Neottia nidus-avis).

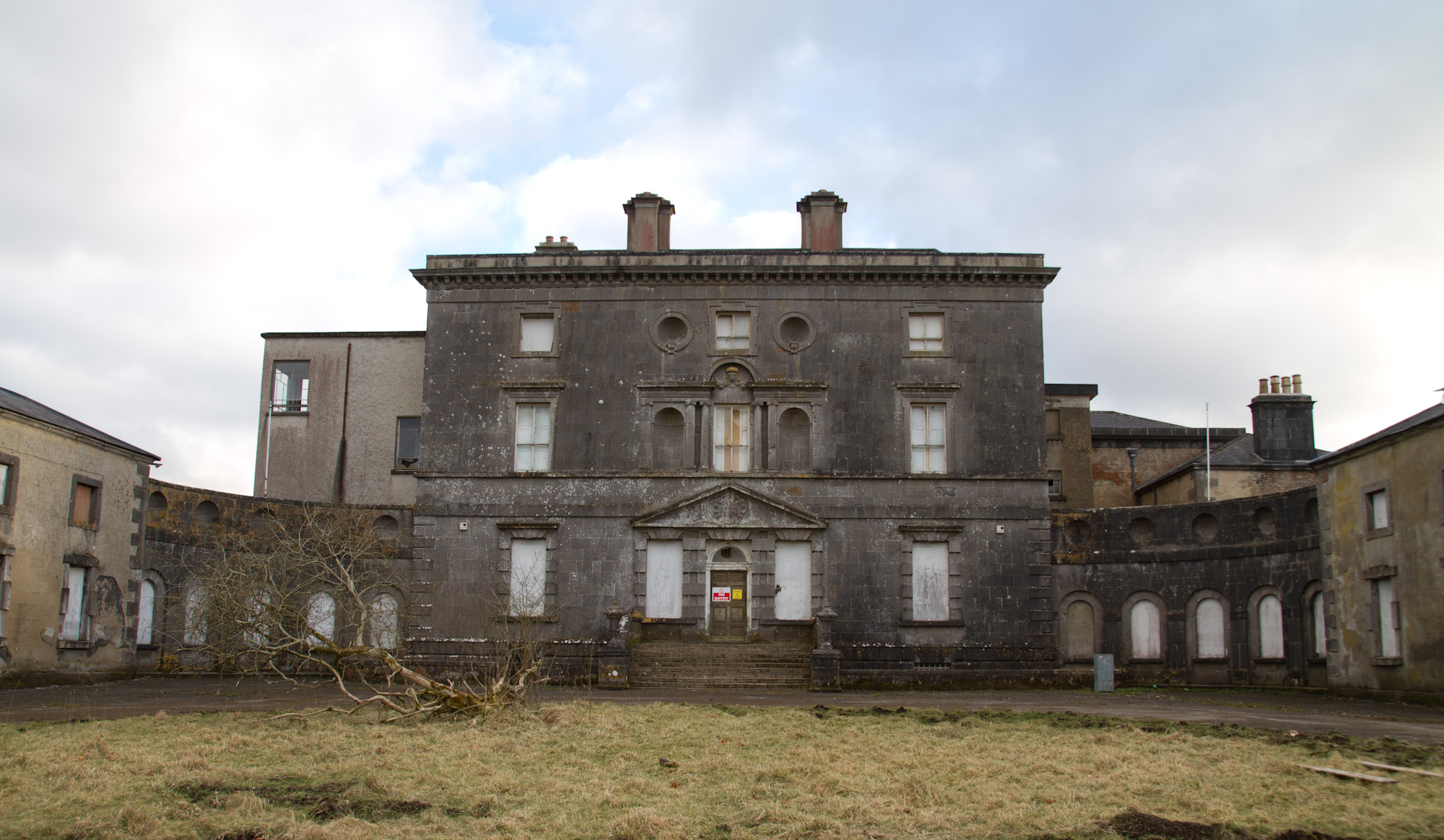
Hazelwood House

Hazelwood is part of the estates of Hazelwood House, a Georgian mansion set beside the River Garavogue, which was built in 1722 by the Wynne family. After the Wynne family left in 1923 the house has had several changes of ownership, suffered periods of neglect, and is now boarded up. The parkland is now used for industrial purposes. To the south of the house the abandoned remains of the former Korean factory SaeHan Information Systems can be seen.
