= Lough Gill =

Lake in County Sligo, Ireland

- Loch Gile (Irish)
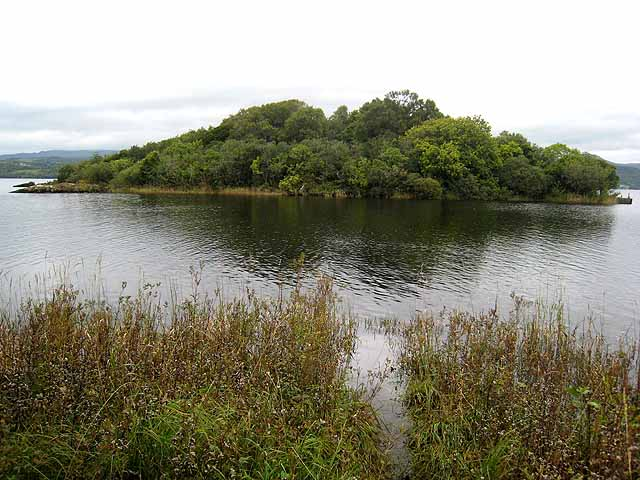
- Lake and Innisfree

- Location in Ireland
- Location: County Sligo & County Leitrim, Ireland
- Coordinates: 54°15′N 08°22′W
- Primary inflows: Bonet River
- Primary outflows: River Garavogue
- Basin countries: Ireland
- Max. length: 8 km (5.0 mi)
- Max. width: 2 km (1.2 mi)
- Surface area: 12.8 km^{2} (4.9 sq mi)
- Max. depth: 31 m (102 ft)
- Surface elevation: 7 m (23 ft)
- Islands: ~20, including Church Island
- Settlements: Sligo

Lough Gill (Irish: Loch Gile, meaning 'bright or white lake') is a freshwater lough (lake) mainly situated in County Sligo, but partly in County Leitrim, in Ireland. Lough Gill provides the setting for William Butler Yeats' poem "The Lake Isle of Innisfree".

== Location and environment ==
Lough Gill is about 8 km or 5 miles long and 2 km or 1 mile wide. The Lough Gill system consists of the Bonet River that flows into the eastern end of the lake and the River Garavogue which drains the lake to the west near Sligo Town.

The picturesque lake is surrounded by woodlands, such as Slish Wood, Dooney Rock, and Hazelwood all of which contain popular nature trails and viewing points along the lake. The wooded hills of Slieve Killery and Slieve Daean dominate the south shore.

It is a popular location for birdwatchers.

=== Flora and fauna ===
Lough Gill has a unique microclimate and is noted for its high number of rare or scarce animal and plant species. It is part of the Lough Gill SAC (Special Area of Conservation) for habitats listed on Annex I and II of the E.U. Habitats Directive, including two with priority status: alluvial forest, orchid-rich calcareous grassland.

The vegetation of the area was dominated by mixed woodland from 4,600 BC to at least 1400 AD. Scots pine was dominant until 3,400 BC. In a scientific study, Arbutus unedo pollen was found at Slish Lake dating from as early as 100 AD, and so it is considered native to this area.

The woods surrounding the lake are dominated by oak (Quercus spp.), rowan (Sorbus aucuparia) and willows (Salix spp.). The shores of the lake are home to the world's northernmost specimens of the rare Mediterranean strawberry tree (Arbutus unedo). It is a small evergreen tree of the family Ericaceae, which in Ireland can grow to be a forest tree, reaching heights of up to 15 metres. Its Irish name is caithne.

The lake shore and surroundings support several rare plant species, including yellow bird's-nest (Monotropa hypopitys), lady's mantle (Alchemilla glaucescens), ivy broomrape (Orobanche hederae), black bryony (Tamus communis), intermediate wintergreen (Pyrola media) and bird's-nest orchid (Neottia nidus-avis).

It is also home to the following rare or protected species: sea lamprey, river lamprey, brook lamprey, white-clawed crayfish, Atlantic salmon and otter. The Lough Gill water system gets a very early run of spring salmon.

A small colony of common terns breed on the lake's islands (20 pairs in 1993). Kingfishers are also found on the lake.

=== Islands ===
The lake contains about 20 small islands, including the Isle of Innisfree, made famous by William Butler Yeats's poem titled 'The Lake Isle of Innisfree'. There are other islands on the lake such as Church Island, which is home to the ruins of a 6th century abbey founded by Saint Lommán of Trim. Another notable island is Cottage island or Beezie's Island, which was inhabited until 1949.

== History ==
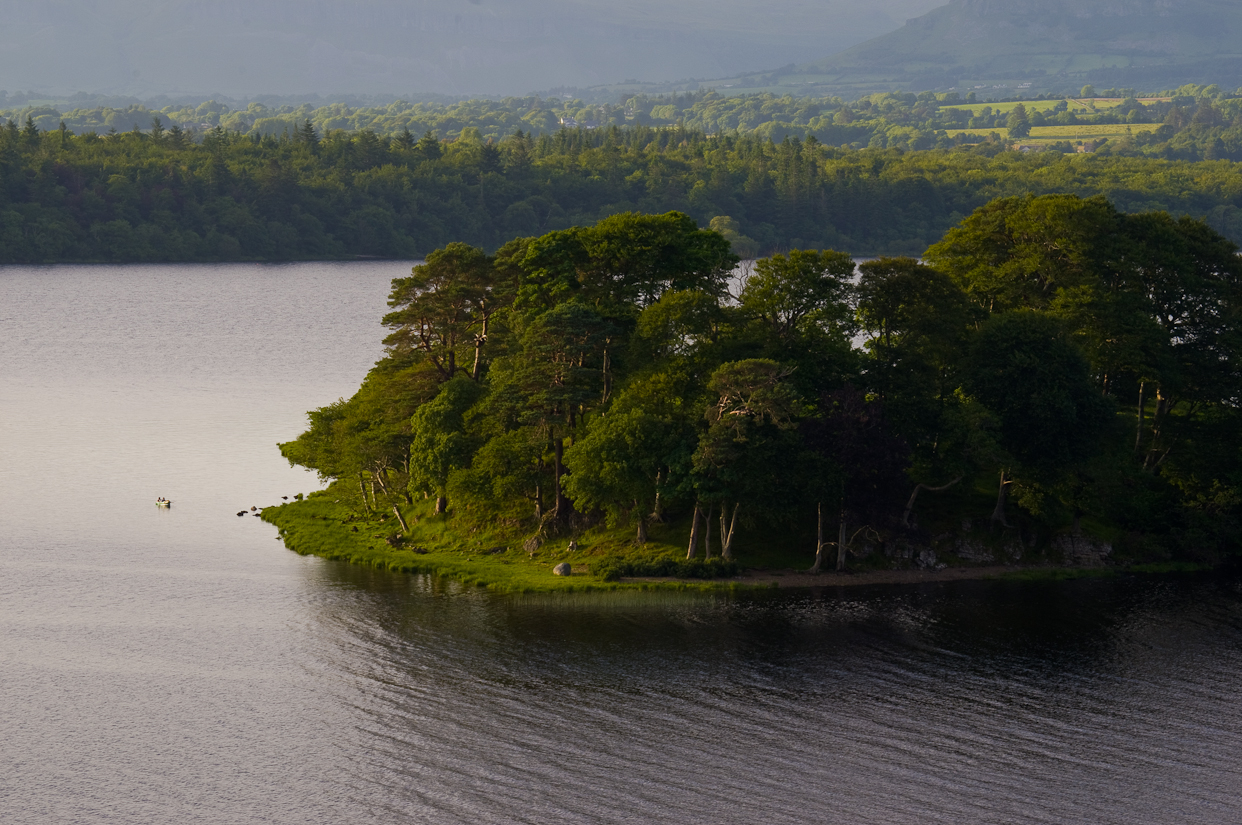
Cottage island, also known as Beezie's Island

In 1836 Thomas O'Connor of the Ordnance Survey noted a saying amongst the people that went "Connacht is the Grianán of Ireland, Cairbre is the Grianán of Connacht, Calry is the Grianán of Cairbre and the Hill is the Grianán of Calgaich". Gríanán is a word meaning literally "sunny place" and implies a place of great natural beauty. The hill of Grianán is at the eastern shore of Lough Gill.

In the early historic era (5th-8th centuries), the area was home to a branch of the Cálraighe. Parke's Castle, a plantation fortified house on the northern shore, was built in the early 17th century by Captain Robert Parke on the site of a former tower house of the Uí Ruairc clann. The Uí Ruairc clan ruled the area from about the 7th century up to the time of Oliver Cromwell.

=== Annal entries ===
In 1196 - Congalach, the son of Farrell O'Rourke, was slain by the men of Lúighne, on Slieve-da-én (Mountain of the Two Birds).

1346 - A war broke out between O'Rourke, i.e. Ualgarg, and Rory, the son of Cathal O'Conor; and an engagement took place between them in Calry-Lough-Gill, in which O'Rourke was routed, and all his gallowglasses slain, i.e. Mac Buirrce, and Mac Neill Cam with their people. O'Rourke was afterwards pursued by Rory O'Conor and the Clann-Donough, and was killed by Mulrony Mac Donough. This was a lamentable deed.

=== Recent history ===
The lake became part of the Hazelwood estate in the 17th century.

== Mythology ==
The Metrical Dinnsenchus tells the following story of how the lake came to be and how it got its name.

"Bright Gile, Romra's daughter, to whom every harbour was known, the broad lake bears her name to denote its outbreak of yore.
The maiden went, on an errand of pride that has hushed the noble hosts, to bathe in the spray by the clear sand-strewn spring.
While the modest maiden was washing in the unruffled water of the pool, she sees on the plain tall Omra as it were an oak, lusty and rude.
Seeing her lover draw near, the noble maid was stricken with shame: she plunged her head under the spring yonder: the nimble maid was drowned.
Her nurse came and bent over her body and sat her down yonder in the spring: as she keened for Gile vehemently, she fell in a frenzy for the girl.
As flowed the tears in sore grief for the maiden, the mighty spring rose over her, till it was a vast and stormy lake.
Loch Gile is named from that encounter after Gile, daughter of Romra: there Omra got his death from stout and lusty Romra.
Romra died outright of his sorrow on the fair hill-side: from him is lordly Carn Romra called, and Carn Omra from Omra, the shame-faced

Loch Gile here is named from Gile, Romra's daughter."

Carn Romra and Carn Omra are the names of the two large neolithic cairns on Cairns hill overlooking the lake.

Sliabh Dhá Éan is also associated with myth.

== Gallery ==
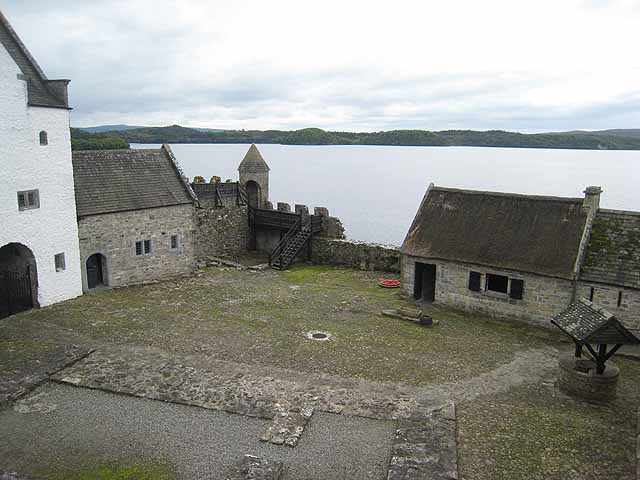
Parke's Castle and Lough Gill

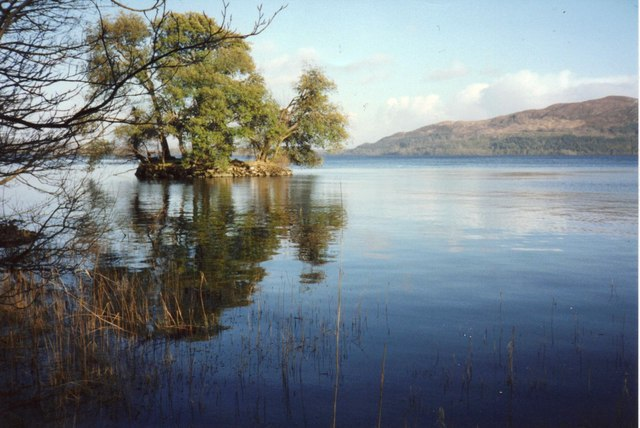
Green Island with Kilkenny Mountain in background

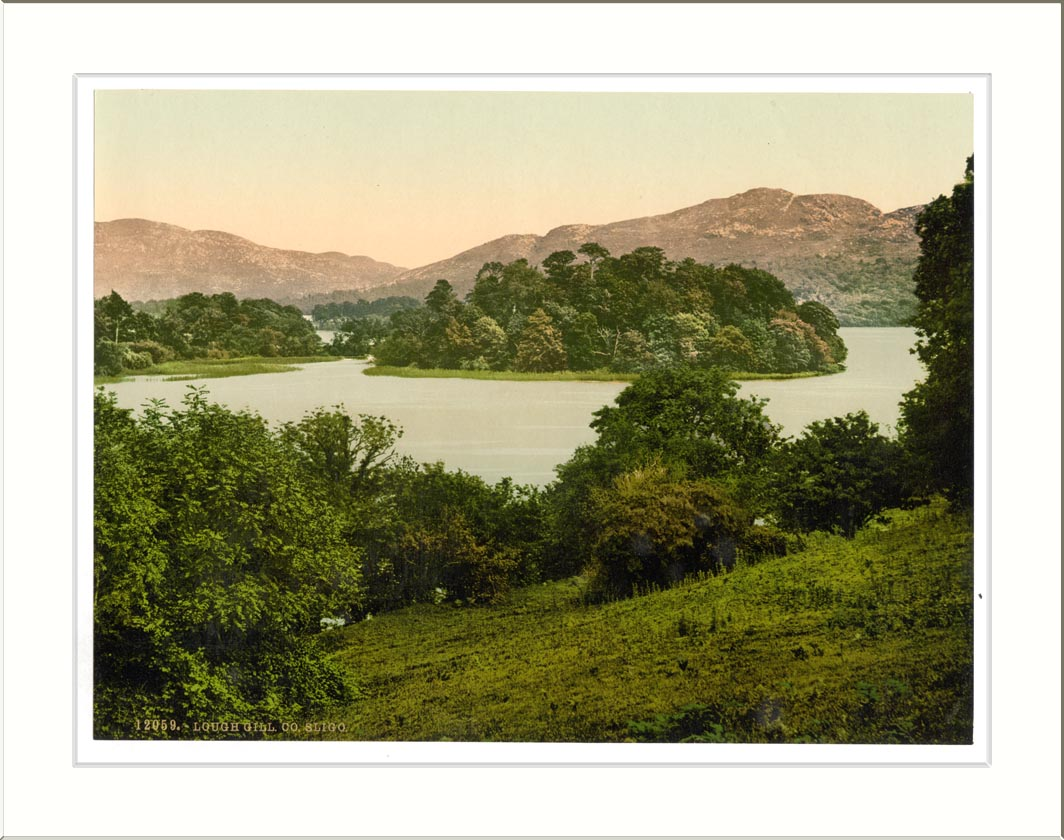
The lake circa 1900

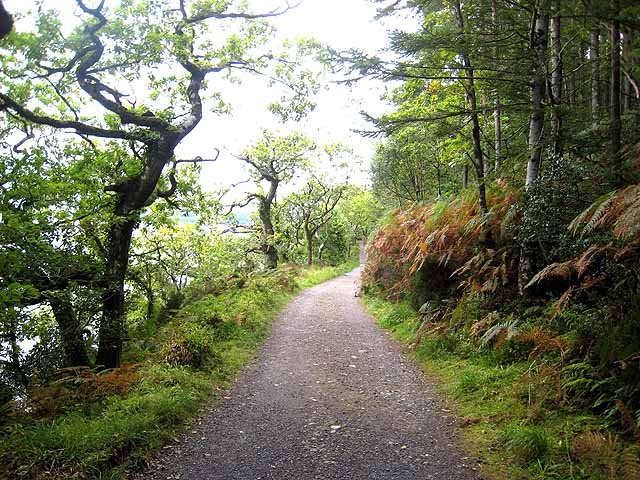
Slish Wood forest trail

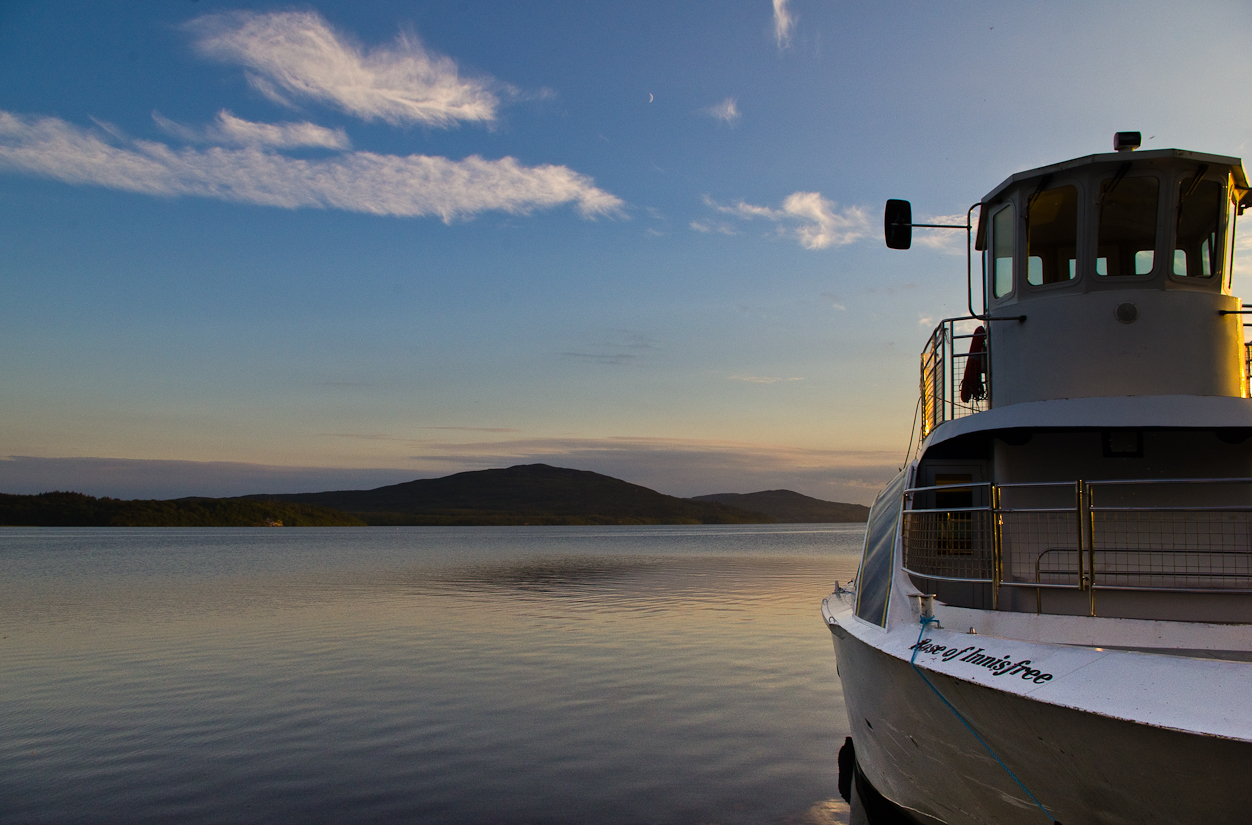
Tour boat on the lake

== See also ==
- List of loughs in Ireland
- Naisse mac Cithruadh
