= Devonshire Avenue Nature Area =

Nature reserve in Sutton, London, England

Coordinates: 51.3544°N 0.1880°W

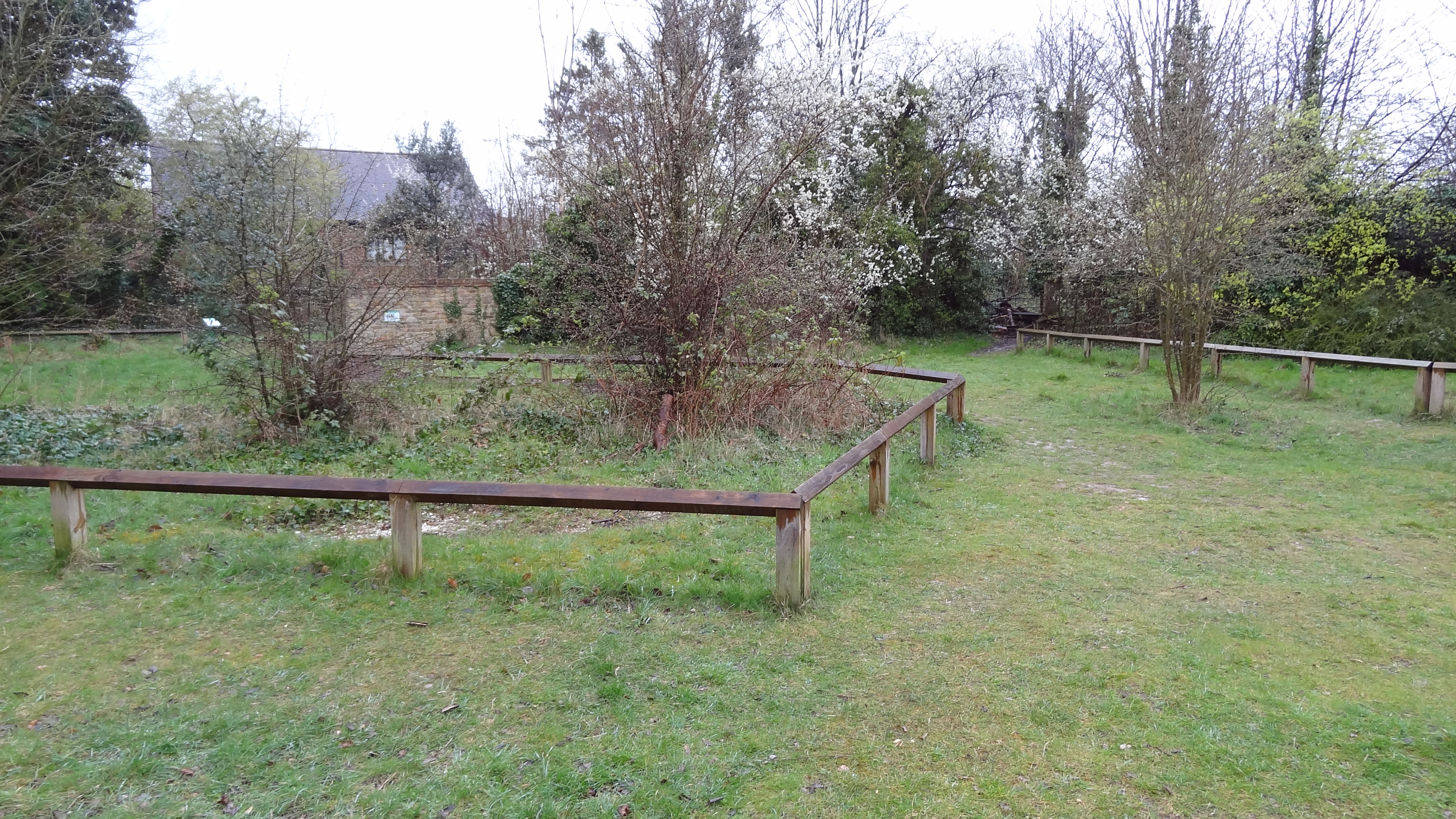

Devonshire Avenue Nature Area is a 0.4 hectare Local Nature Reserve and Site of Borough Importance for Nature Conservation, Grade II, in South Sutton in the London Borough of Sutton. It is owned by Sutton Council and managed by the Council and Sutton Nature Conservation Volunteers.

The site was occupied by three houses which were bombed during the Second World War. The rubble was then cleared and the area was used as an informal playground until the early 1990s, when it was converted by the Council to be used for nature conservation. Most of the site is neutral grassland, but it has areas of chalk grassland, scrub and trees. A notable species is the small blue butterfly, which is rare in the borough. Plants include the nationally scarce ivy broomrape, and kidney vetch and bird's-foot trefoil.

The site is located at the corner of Devonshire Avenue and Devonshire Road.
