= Church Island =

Church Island may refer to:

- Church Island (Menai Strait), Wales
- Church Island, River Thames, England
- Church Island (Lough Gill), Ireland
- Church Island (Lough Currane), Ireland
- Church Island (Valentia Harbour), Ireland
- Church Island (Lough Owel), Ireland
