= Church Island (Lough Gill) =

Uninhabited lake island in Sligo, Ireland

Native name: Inis Mór
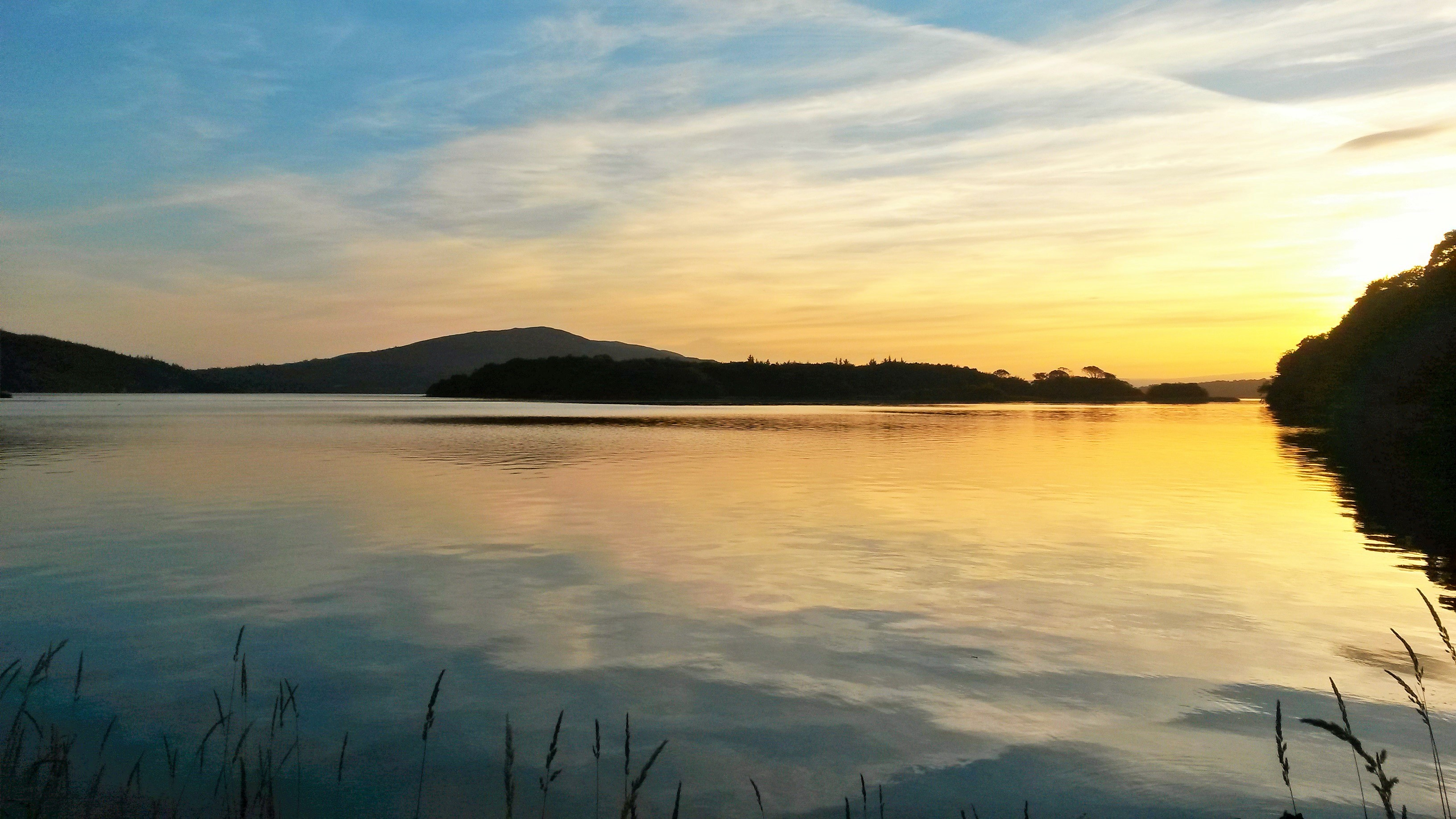
- Sunset at Church Island

- Location within island of Ireland

Geography
- Location: Lough Gill
- Coordinates: 54.251791°N 8.390983°W
- Area: 0.17 km^{2} (0.066 sq mi)

Administration
- Ireland
- Province: Connacht
- County: Sligo

Demographics
- Population: 0
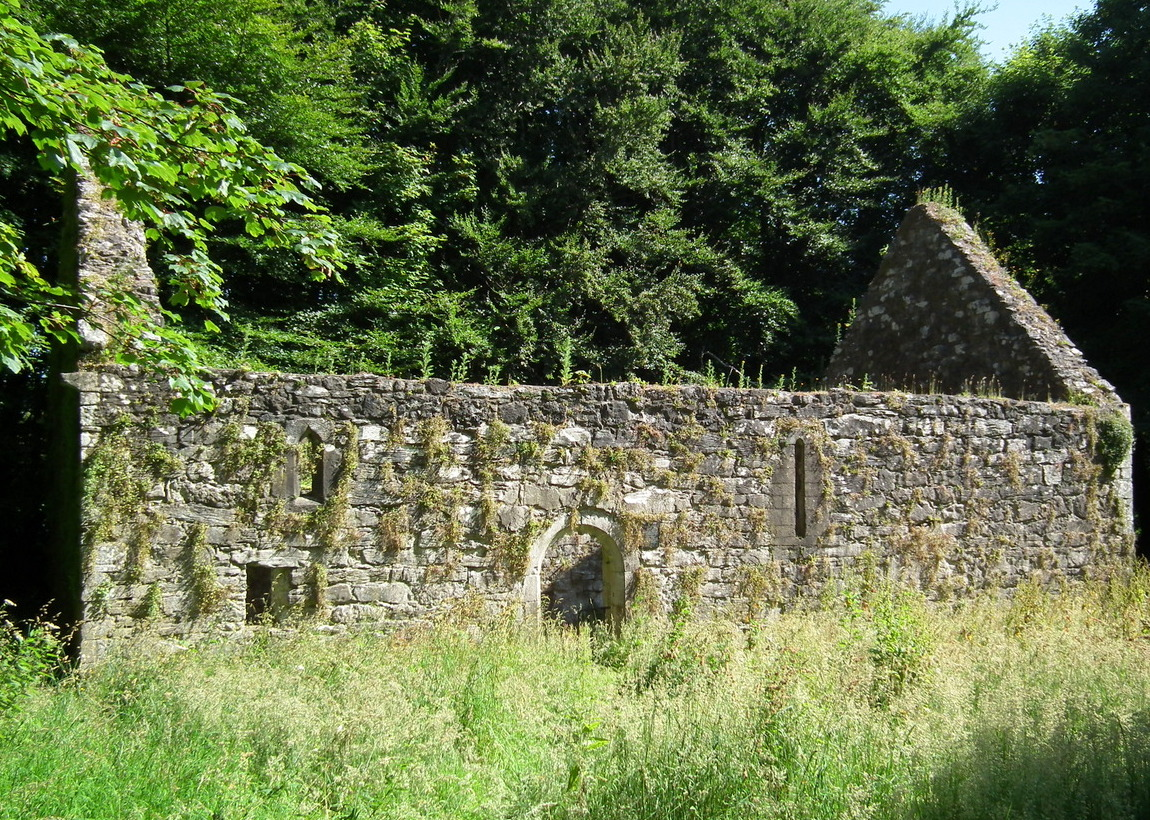
- Church on Church Island

National monument of Ireland
- Official name: Church Island
- Reference no.: 118

Church Island (Irish: Inis Mór) is one of 23 islands on Lough Gill, situated in the northwest of Ireland. It is the largest island on the lake and is named after a monastery that was founded there in the 6th century, by Saint Lommán of Trim.

== The island ==
Church Island is known as Inis Mór in the Irish language, meaning 'big island'. It is located in the approximate centre of Lough Gill and is 16.8 hectares in size, or 42 acres.

It is rumoured by locals that this island is the one referred to in W. B. Yeats' poem The Lake Isle of Inishfree. This is due to the fact that Inishfree island is too small to be inhabited and does not match the poet's description of the island. It has also been suggested that the name Innisfree sounded better than Church Island for the poem. Former staff members of the nearby Clogherevagh House back up this story by recalling Yeats' visits to the house and frequent trips to Church Island.

Church Island was inhabited right until the early 20th Century. The 1911 Census recorded a family of four people still living on the island. The island is now deserted, but the cottage belonging to the last inhabitants still remains standing.

Mass is occasionally held on the island and local people from Calry parish visit the graves of their relatives, some of whom are buried on the island.

== Church ==
The church is said to have been founded by Saint Lommán of Trim in the 6th Century. The church on Church Island is a National Monument.

The early medieval church is all that remains of what was once a larger monastery. The site flourished in later centuries and became a centre of learning. A bardic school was set up there by the O'Cuirnins, a well respected family of bards under the patronage of the O'Rourkes, a powerful Gaelic family who controlled the Kingdom of Breifne.

In 1416, according to the Annals, 'The church of Inis Mor, in Lough Gill, was burned; and Screaptra ui Chuirnin [O'Curnin's manuscripts], and the Leabhar Gearr of the O'Cuirnins, as well as many other precious articles, were burned also.' Most sources agree that the fire was accidental. According to W.J Fennell, the church showed no sign of reoccupation after the fire, when he surveyed it in 1904.

The church is rectangular in plan, with two sections. The smaller, western section consists of a two-storey library, as well as a pair of 'squints' facing into the eastern section, which are also known as hagioscopes. The larger, eastern section of the church consists of the nave and the eastern gable wall has a single ogee window in the centre.

Near the entrance door there once was a cavity in a rock, which was known locally as 'Our Lady's Bed', which was a frequent place of pilgrimage for pregnant women. This rock has since been removed and its location to date is unknown.

There is a mysterious inscription inside the doorway of the church, on the right hand side. No consensus has been agreed as to what the inscription reads, but some theories suggest it may be Latin or Ogham.
