= Cálraighe =

Ethnic group in Ireland

The Cálraighe were a population-group found mostly in northern Connacht as well as County Westmeath and County Longford. They were purported descendants of Lugaid Cal, son of Daire Sirchrechtaig, who was himself a supposed descendant of Lugaid mac Itha, a first cousin of Míl Espáine.

Daire is stated as having five sons, all called Lugaid, from who each derived the Corcu Loígde, Corco Oirce, Loigis Laigin, Dal Mesen Corb and the Calraige.

Around a dozen branches of the Calraige are listed as inhabitants of northern Connacht. They include:

- Cálraighe Tre Maige of Druim Leas – now Drumlease parish, County Leitrim
- Cálraighe Aelmag – Snedriagail, abbot of Clonmacnoise (died 781), was of this branch
- Cálraighe Locha Gile – possibly an alternative name for the previous
- Cálraighe Droma Cliab – an alternative name for the Cálraighe Locha Gile
- Cálraighe Laithim – location uncertain, possibly near that of Droma Cliab (Drumcliffe, County Sligo)
- Cálraighe Mor – a tuath aithech located with the Lúighne in mid-Sligo
- Cálraighe in Chorainn – a.k.a. Cálraighe Morna, found in Corann, Sligo
- Cálraighe Luirg – located south-east of the previous, in Moylurg, County Roscommon
- Cálraighe Culi Cernadan – located in Attymass and Kilgarvan parishes, County Mayo
- Cálraighe Mag nEileag – situated on the north-west corner of Lough Conn, County Mayo
- Cálraighe Mag Muirisc – at the mouth of the river Moy
- Cluain Calraí - located at Clooncolry near Bornacoola, Mohill parish, county Leitrim.
- Druim Chálraighe - located at Drumhalry nearby Carrigallen, in county Leitrim.
- Cnoc Droma Calraí at Knock parish, County Mayo.
- an unattested branch at Glencalry, Doonfeeny, County Mayo

Cálraighe found outside Connacht included the following:

- Cálraighe Bri Leith – found in County Longford
- Cálraighe in Chalaid – in the parish of Ballyloughloe, County Westmeath
- Cálraighe Bregmuine – barony of Brawny, County Westmeath
- Cálraighe Tethba – somewhere in County Longford
