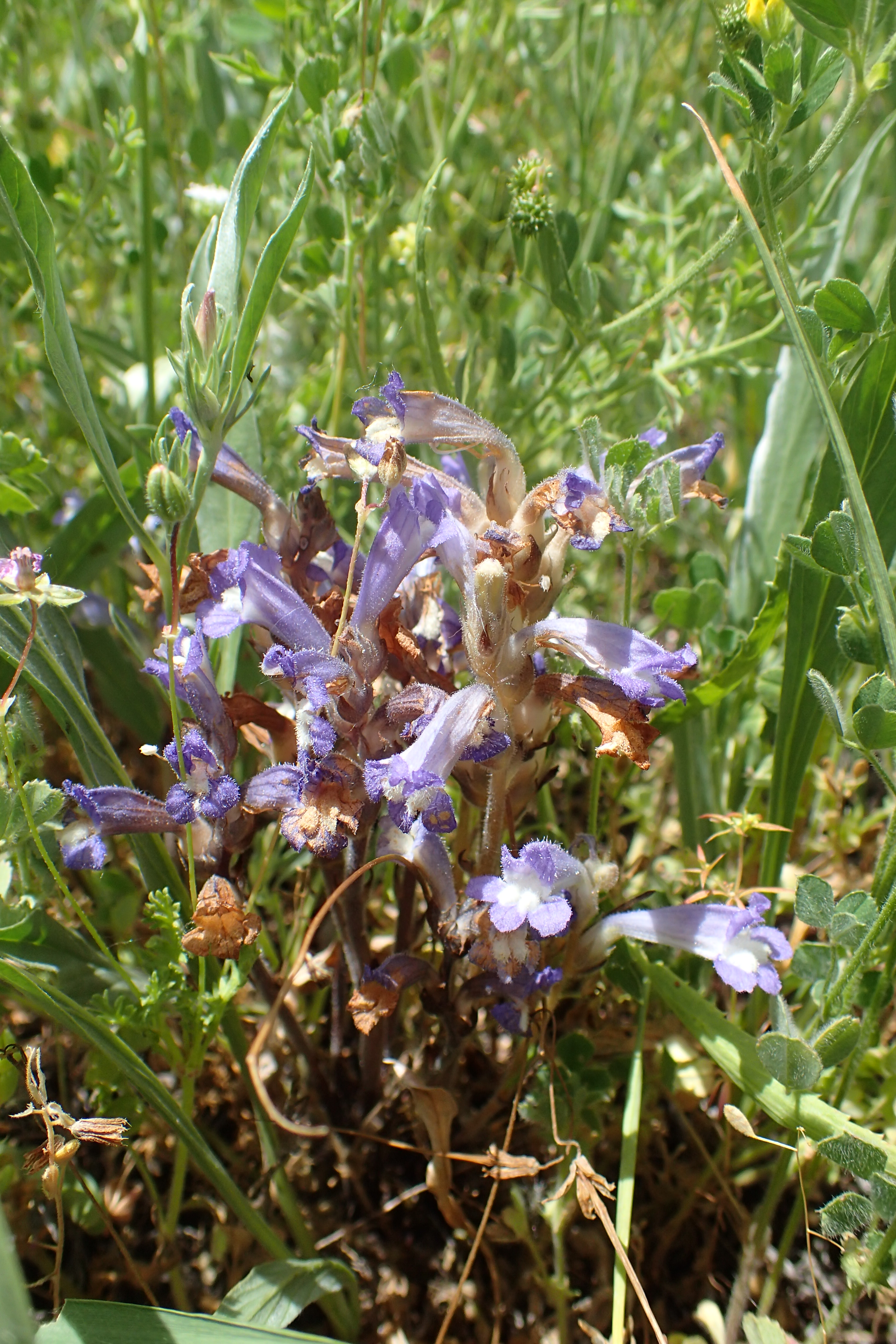

Scientific classification
- Kingdom: Plantae
- Clade: Tracheophytes
- Clade: Angiosperms
- Clade: Eudicots
- Clade: Asterids
- Order: Lamiales
- Family: Orobanchaceae
- Genus: Phelipanche
- Species: P. nana

Binomial name
- Phelipanche nana (Noë ex Rchb.) Soják

Synonyms
- Orobanche nana subsp. melitensis

= Phelipanche nana =

Species of plant

Phelipanche nana is a plant species in the family Orobanchaceae.
