= 7-Hydroxy-2,3,4,8-tetramethoxyphenanthrene =

Names
- Preferred IUPAC name 1,5,6,7-Tetramethoxyphenanthren-2-ol

Identifiers
3D model (JSmol)	Interactive image
ChEMBL	ChEMBL3634641
ChemSpider	4475060
PubChem CID	5315859
CompTox Dashboard (EPA)	DTXSID901031829
- InChI: InChI=1S/C18H18O5/c1-20-14-9-10-5-6-12-11(7-8-13(19)16(12)21-2)15(10)18(23-4)17(14)22-3/h5-9,19H,1-4H3 Key: JILKBZSAOHQOQD-UHFFFAOYSA-N
- SMILES: COc3c2c(ccc1c(OC)c(O)ccc12)cc(OC)c3OC

Properties
Chemical formula	C_{18}H_{18}O_{5}
Molar mass	314.337 g·mol^{−1}
- Except where otherwise noted, data are given for materials in their standard state (at 25 °C [77 °F], 100 kPa). Infobox references

7-Hydroxy-2,3,4,8-tetramethoxyphenanthrene is one of several phenanthrenes contained in the rhizome of Dioscorea communis.
