= Naisse mac Cithruadh =

Naisse mac Cithruadh, Irish musician, died 1561.

== Biography ==
The Annals of Loch Ce, sub anno 1561, contain a reference to Naisse and his wife, and their deaths on Lough Gill:

Naisse, the son of Cithruadh, the most eminent musician that was in Erinn, was drowned on Loch-Gile, and his wife, the daughter of Mac Donnchadha, and Athairne, the son of Matthew Glas; and the son of O'Duibhgennain was a great loss.

== See also ==
- Daithí Ó Drónaí, experimental musician, born 1991.
- Donnchadh Ó Hámsaigh, harper, 1695 – 5 or 11 November 1807.
- Donell Dubh Ó Cathail, harper to Elizabeth I, c. 1560s-c.1660.
- Maol Ruanaidh Cam Ó Cearbhaill, murdered Saturday 10 June 1329.
- Tuotilo, monk and composer, c. 850 – c.915.
