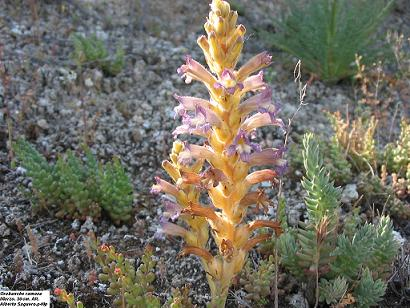

Scientific classification
- Kingdom: Plantae
- Clade: Tracheophytes
- Clade: Angiosperms
- Clade: Eudicots
- Clade: Asterids
- Order: Lamiales
- Family: Orobanchaceae
- Genus: Phelipanche; Pomel

Species
- Phelipanche aegyptiaca; Phelipanche nana; Phelipanche ramosa

= Phelipanche =

Genus of flowering plants

Phelipanche is a genus of parasitic plants in the family Orobanchaceae.

== Taxonomy ==
The genus Phelipanche is sister to the genus Aphyllon.

=== Species ===
Some species include:

- Phelipanche aegyptiaca
- Phelipanche nana
- Phelipanche ramosa
