= The Lake Isle of Innisfree =

Poem by William Butler Yeats

Coordinates: 54.2465°N 8.3579°W

The Lake Isle of Innisfree

I will arise and go now, and go to Innisfree,
And a small cabin build there, of clay and wattles made;
Nine bean rows will I have there, a hive for the honey bee,
And live alone in the bee-loud glade.

And I shall have some peace there, for peace comes dropping slow,
Dropping from the veils of the morning to where the cricket sings;
There midnight's all a glimmer, and noon a purple glow,
And evening full of the linnet's wings.

I will arise and go now, for always night and day
I hear lake water lapping with low sounds by the shore;
While I stand on the roadway, or on the pavements grey,
I hear it in the deep heart's core.

"The Lake Isle of Innisfree" is a twelve-line poem comprising three quatrains, written by William Butler Yeats in 1888 and first published in the National Observer in 1890. It was reprinted in The Countess Kathleen and Various Legends and Lyrics in 1892 and as an illustrated Cuala Press Broadside in 1932.

"The Lake Isle of Innisfree" exemplifies the style of the Celtic Revival: it is an attempt to create a form of poetry that was Irish in origin rather than one that adhered to the standards set by English poets and critics. It received critical acclaim in the United Kingdom and France. The poem is featured in Irish passports.

== Background ==
Lake Isle of Innisfree is an uninhabited island within Lough Gill, in Ireland, near which Yeats spent his summers as a child. Yeats describes the inspiration for the poem coming from a "sudden" memory of his childhood while walking down Fleet Street in London in 1888. He writes, "I had still the ambition, formed in Sligo in my teens, of living in imitation of Thoreau on Innisfree, a little island in Lough Gill, and when walking through Fleet Street very homesick I heard a little tinkle of water and saw a fountain in a shop-window which balanced a little ball upon its jet, and began to remember lake water. From the sudden remembrance came my poem "Innisfree," my first lyric with anything in its rhythm of my own music. I had begun to loosen rhythm as an escape from rhetoric and from that emotion of the crowd that rhetoric brings, but I only understood vaguely and occasionally that I must for my special purpose use nothing but the common syntax. A couple of years later I could not have written that first line with its conventional archaism—"Arise and go"—nor the inversion of the last stanza."

== Analysis ==
The twelve-line poem is divided into three quatrains and is an example of Yeats's earlier lyric poems. The poem expresses the speaker's longing for the peace and tranquility of Innisfree while residing in an urban setting. He can escape the noise of the city and be lulled by the "lake water lapping with low sounds by the shore." On this small island, he can return to nature by growing beans and having bee hives, by enjoying the "purple glow" of heather at noon, the sounds of birds' wings, and, of course, the bees. He can even build a cabin and stay on the island much as Thoreau, the American Transcendentalist, lived at Walden Pond. During Yeats's lifetime it was—to his annoyance—one of his most popular poems, and on one occasion was recited (or sung) in his honor by two (or ten—accounts vary) thousand Boy Scouts. The first quatrain speaks to the needs of the body (food and shelter); the second to the needs of the spirit (peace); the final quatrain is the meeting of the inner life (memory) with the physical world (pavement grey).

== Legacy ==
=== Literature ===
The poem is extensively referenced in Nicolas Freeling's Lake Isle (1974). Furthermore, the poem is quoted in J. B. Priestley's essay "At Thurston's" (1932) and David Mitchell's Ghostwritten (1999).

=== Film and television ===
The poem is referenced in the films The Quiet Man (1952), Million Dollar Baby (2004), and Three and Out (2008), as well as the Fringe episode "Brave New World" (2012) and the season finale of Outlander, "And the World Was All Around Us" (2026).

=== Music ===
The poem is set to music by various individuals and groups, including:

- Muriel Herbert (1928)
- Hamilton Camp (on Paths of Victory, 1964)
- Judy Collins (on Living, 1971)
- Shusha Guppy (on This is the Day, 1974)
- Angelo Branduardi (on Branduardi canta Yeats, 1986)
- Anúna (on Invocation, 1994)
- Richard B. Evans (on In the Deep Heart's Core, 1995)
- Ben Moore (2001)
- Eleanor Daley (2001)
- Paul Kelly (on Conversations with Ghosts, 2013)
- Ola Gjeilo (2016)
- Donovan (2022)

Furthermore, there are many songs and albums that allude to, are inspired by, or are named after a line in the poem, including:

- "Lake Isle of Innersfree" by Sir Lord Baltimore (1970)
- "Yeats' Grave" by The Cranberries (1994)
- For Peace Comes Dropping Slow by Jackie Leven (1997)
- "The Spinster's Almanac" by Christine Fellows (2007)
- "The Shrine/An Argument", "Isles," and "Bedouin Dress" by Fleet Foxes (2011)
- "Innisfree" by Faun (2022)

=== Other ===
South Korean cosmetic brand Innisfree takes its name from the poem.

== See also ==
- 1893 in poetry
- List of works by William Butler Yeats
