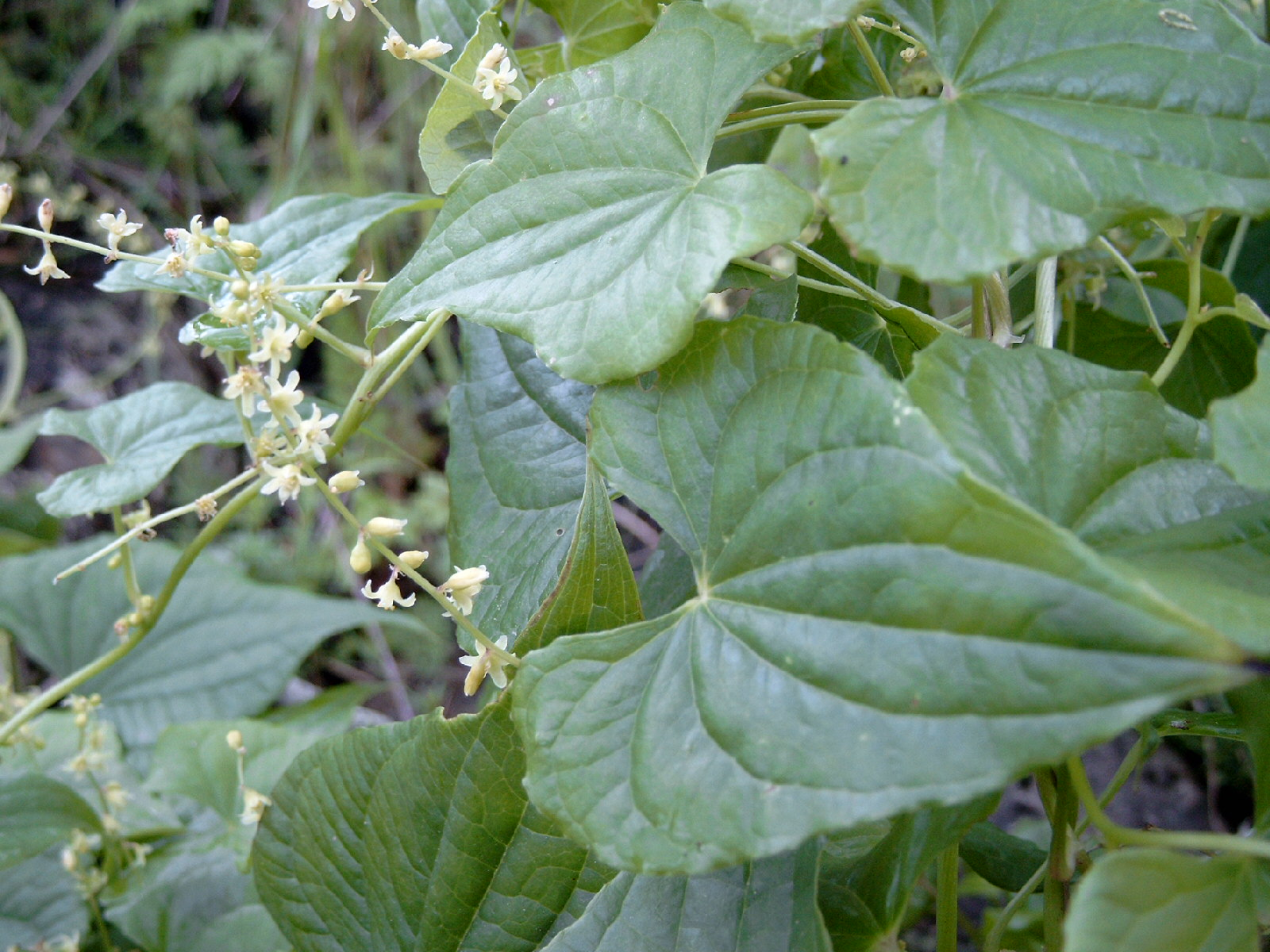

Scientific classification
- Kingdom: Plantae
- Clade: Tracheophytes
- Clade: Angiosperms
- Clade: Monocots
- Order: Dioscoreales
- Family: Dioscoreaceae
- Genus: Dioscorea
- Species: D. communis

Binomial name
- Dioscorea communis (L.) Caddick & Wilkin

Synonyms
- Tamus communis (L.); Tamus cretica L.; Tamus racemosa Gouan; Smilax rubra Willd.; Tamus cordifolia Stokes; Tamus edulis Lowe; Tamus norsa Lowe; Dioscorea canariensis Webb & Berthel.; Tamus canariensis Willd. ex Kunth; Tamus parviflora Kunth; Tamus baccifera St.-Lag.; Tamus cirrhosa Hausskn. ex Bornm.

= Dioscorea communis =

Black bryony

Species of flowering plant in the yam family

Dioscorea communis or Tamus communis is a species of flowering plant in the yam family Dioscoreaceae and is commonly known as black bryony, lady's-seal or black bindweed.

== Description ==
It is a climbing herbaceous plant growing to 2–4 m (6.6–13 ft) tall, with stems that twine anticlockwise. The leaves are spirally arranged, heart-shaped, up to 10 cm (3.9 in) long and 8 cm (3.1 in) broad, with a petiole up to 5 cm (2.0 in) long. It is dioecious, with separate male and female plants. The flowers are individually inconspicuous, greenish-yellow, 3–6 mm diameter, with six petals; the male flowers produced in slender 5–10 cm racemes, the female flowers in shorter clusters. The fruit is a bright red berry, 1 cm diameter. Its fairly large tuber is, like the rest of the plant, poisonous.

Like most Dioscorea species that have been examined, D. communis possesses extrafloral nectaries at the petiole or leaf underside.

== Distribution ==
Dioscorea communis is native and widespread throughout southern and central Europe, northwest Africa and western Asia, from Ireland to the Canary Islands, east to Iran and Crimea.

== Habitat ==
Dioscorea communis is a typical plant of the forest understory, from the sea to the mountains, usually in dense woods, but it can also be found in meadows and hedges.

== Uses ==
All components of the black bryony plant, including the tubers, are poisonous due to saponin content, so it is not typically used internally. An exception is only reported for young shoots, which are harvested when saponin content is still low and consumed as vegetable. However, it has been used as a poultice for bruises and inflamed joints. It has been suggested that black bryony be used topically with caution, due to a tendency for the plant to cause painful blisters.

Studies have isolated calcium oxalate deposits and histamines in the berry juice and rhizomes, which may contribute to skin irritation and contact dermatitis associated with black bryony.

== Chemistry ==
The rhizome contains phenanthrenes (7-hydroxy-2,3,4,8-tetramethoxyphenanthrene, 2,3,4-trimethoxy-7,8-methylenedioxyphenanthrene, 3-hydroxy-2,4,-dimethoxy-7,8-methylenedioxyphenanthrene, 2-hydroxy-3,5,7-trimethoxyphenanthrene and 2-hydroxy-3,5,7-trimethoxy-9,10-dihydrophenanthrene).

== Gallery ==
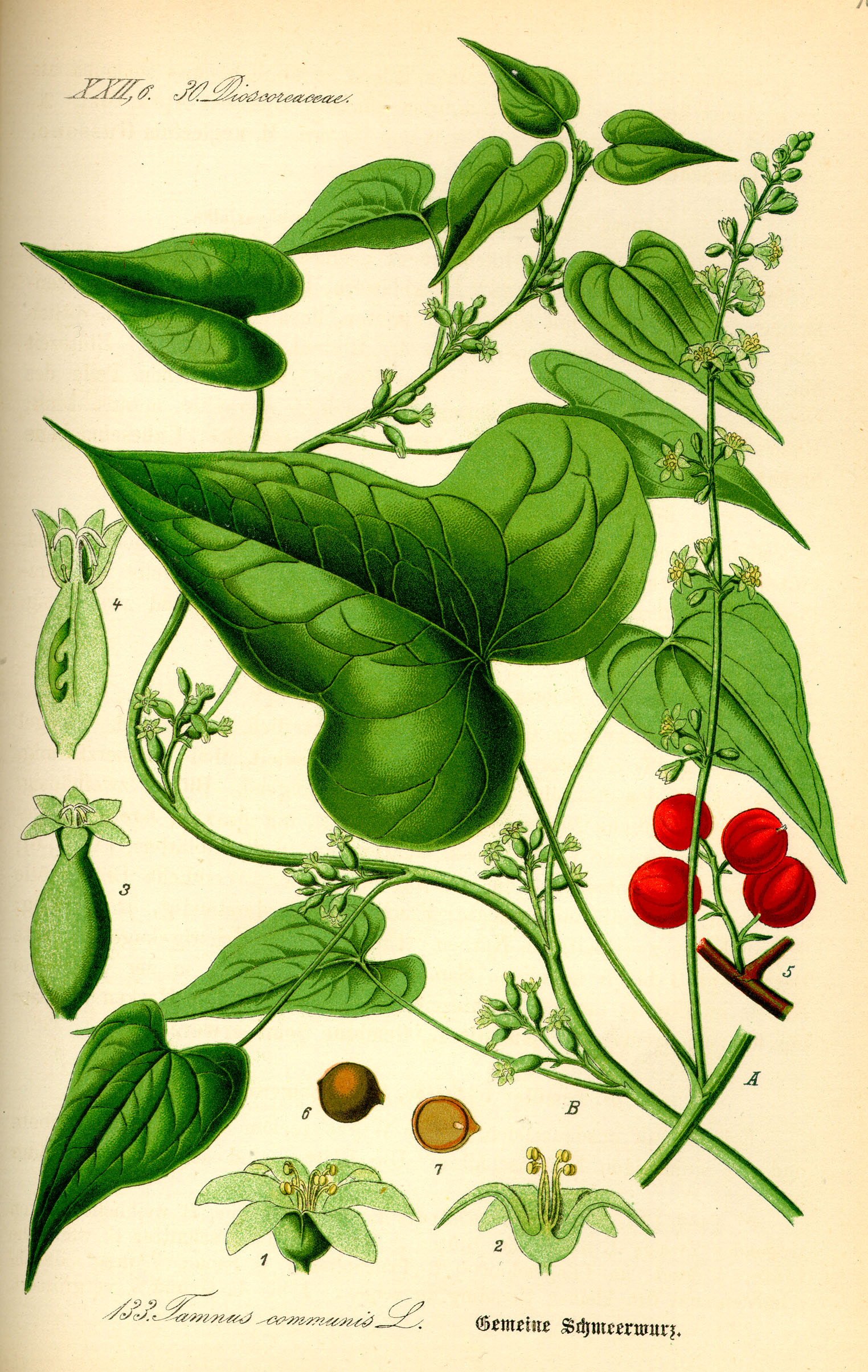
Illustration from Flora von Deutschland, Österreich und der Schweiz 1885

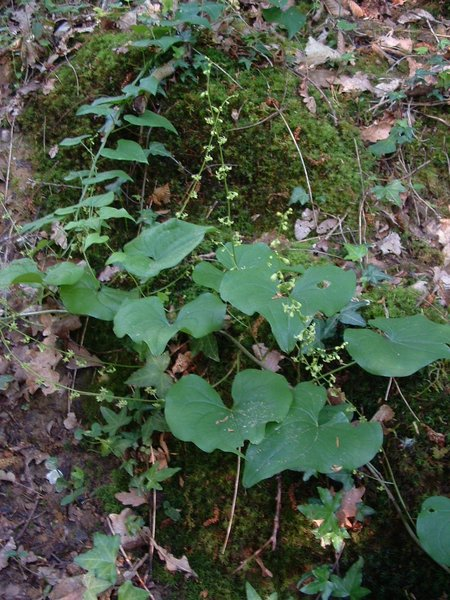
Plant of Dioscorea communis

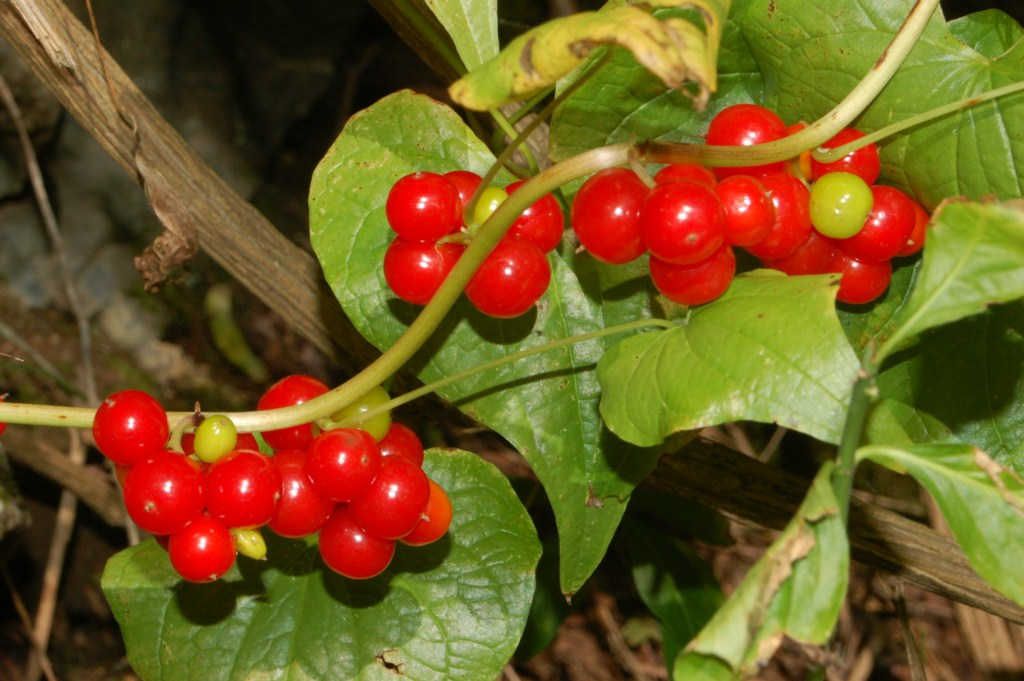
Close-up of fruits of Dioscorea communis

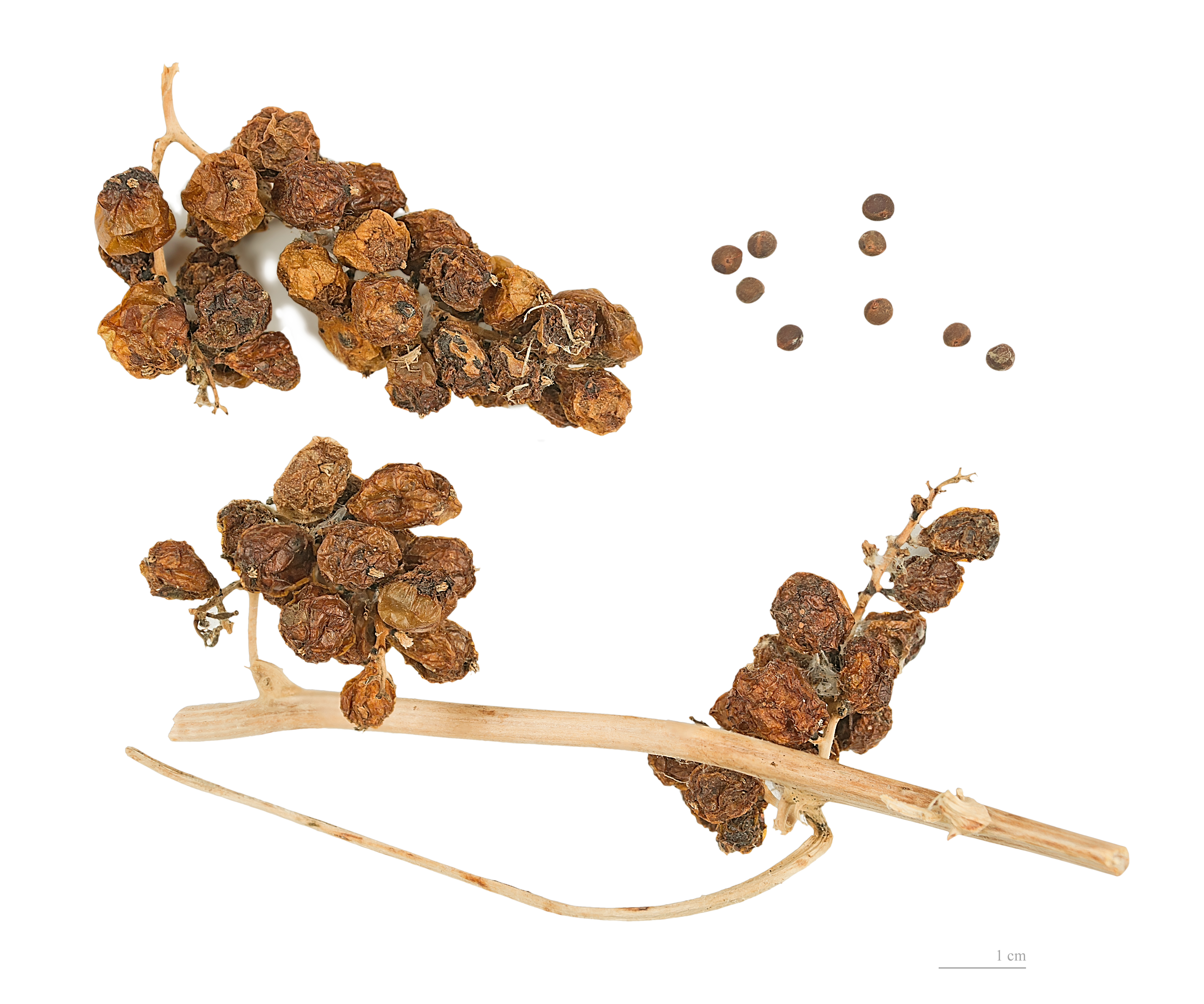
Fruits and seeds

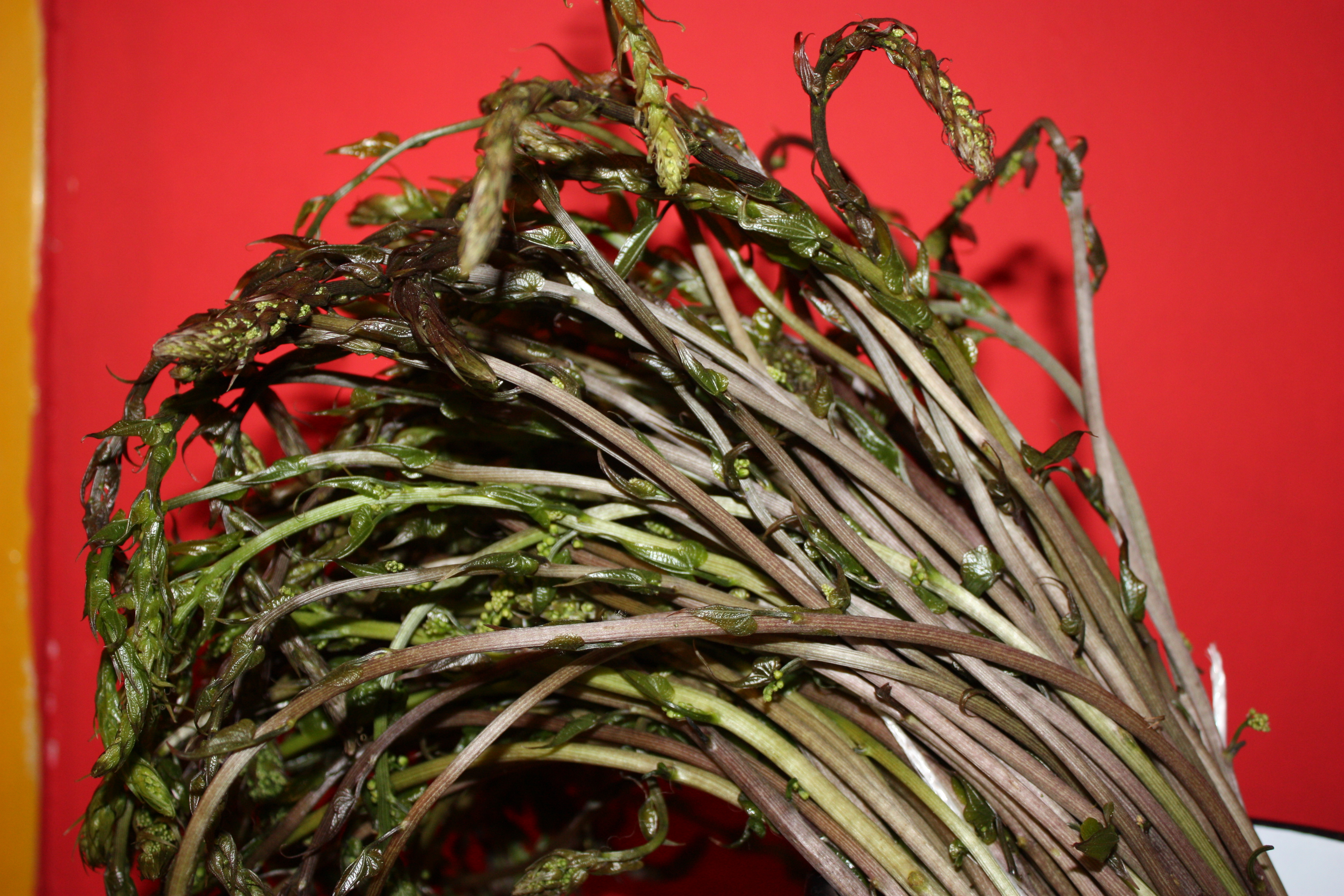
Young shoots - edible part of black bryony
