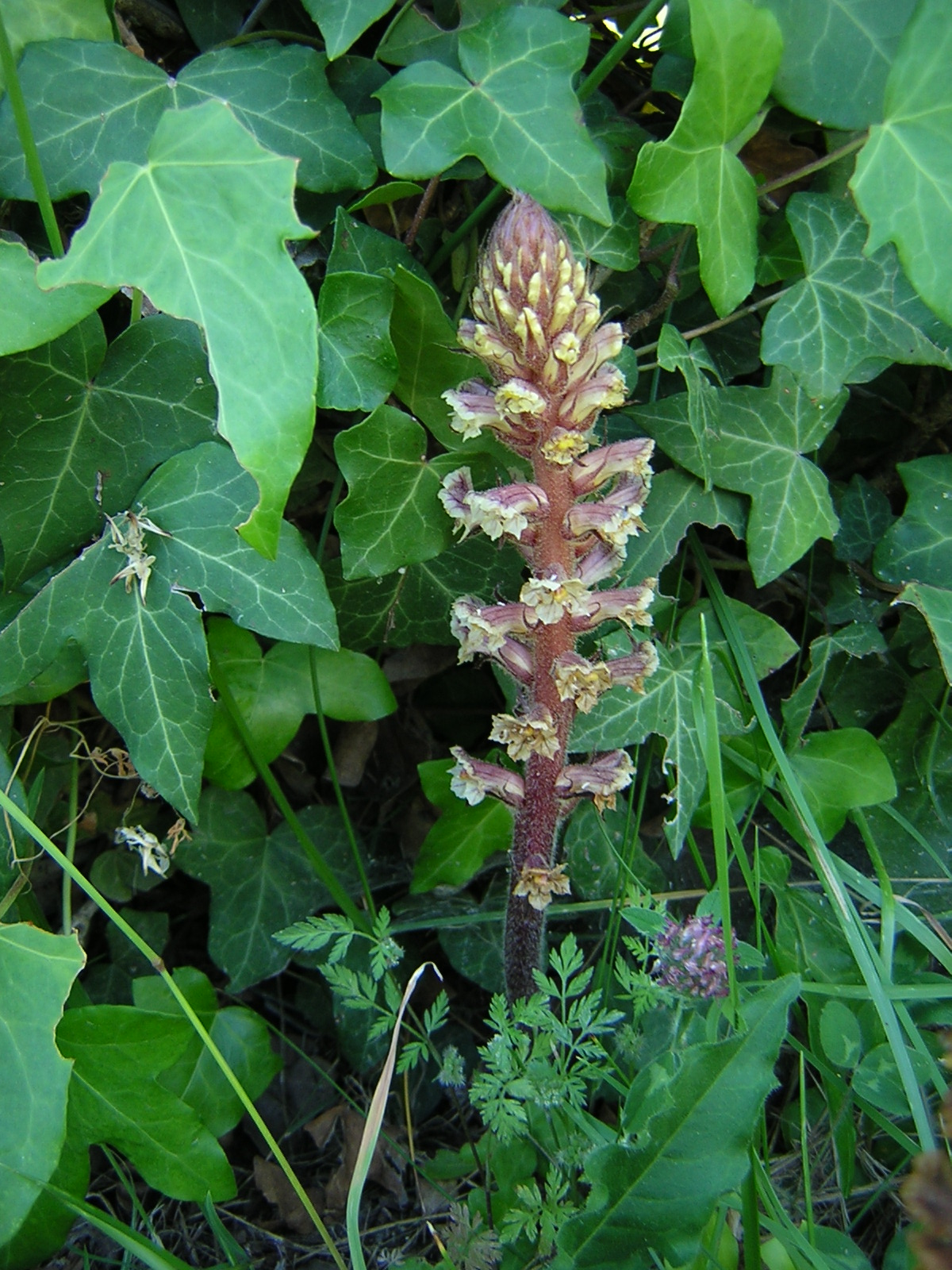

Scientific classification
- Kingdom: Plantae
- Clade: Tracheophytes
- Clade: Angiosperms
- Clade: Eudicots
- Clade: Asterids
- Order: Lamiales
- Family: Orobanchaceae
- Genus: Orobanche
- Species: O. hederae

Binomial name
- Orobanche hederae Duby

= Orobanche hederae =

Species of flowering plant

Orobanche hederae, the ivy broomrape, is, like other members of the genus Orobanche, a parasitic plant without chlorophyll, and thus totally dependent on its host, which is ivy. It grows to 60 cm (2 ft), with stems in shades of brown and purple, sometimes yellow. The flowers are 10–22 mm (0.4–0.9 in) long, cream in colour with reddish-purple veins.

== Etymology ==
Orobanche is derived from Greek, and means 'bitter vetch strangler' or 'legume strangler'. This name originates from the species Orobanche rapum-genistae, which parasitizes legumes. The name hederae means 'of ivy', in reference to its host plant, Hedera.

Its common name in English is ivy broomrape. It is also called frare de l'heura in Catalan, bršljanov volovod in Croatian, záraza břečťanová in Czech, vedbend-gyvelkvæler in Danish, klimopbremraap in Dutch, orobanche du lierre in French, klimmerblêdfretter in Frysk, efeuwürger and efeu-sommerwurz in German, borostyán-vajvirág in Hungarian, múchóg or múchóg mhór in Irish, succiamele dell'edera in Italian, bergflette-snylterot in Norwegian, erva-toira da hera or erva-toira in Portuguese, заразиха плющевая in Russian, záraza brečtanová in Slovak, pojalnik bršljanov in Slovene, espárrago de lobo, jopo de la hiedra, jopo espárrago de lobo, or matalegumbre in Spanish, murgrönssnyltrot in Swedish, tez canavarotu in Turkish, and gorfanc eiddew or gorfanhadlen eiddew in Welsh.

== Description ==
Its yellowish to purplish stems are usually strongly swollen at the base and 15–60 cm (5.9–23.6 in) by 0.3–0.8 cm (0.12–0.31 in). They are covered in short soft glandular hairs. Leaves are acute and oblong to lance-shaped. Its calyx (sepals) are 10–15 mm (0.39–0.59 in) with free segments that are entire or unequally bifid. Its dull-cream to reddish purple corolla (petals) is 10–22 mm (0.39–0.87 in). They are almost hairless and upright spreading to more or less patent. Filaments (stalks of the stamen) are inserted 3–4 mm (0.12–0.16 in) above the base of the corolla. They are usually hairless but rarely somewhat hairy below. Fruit are 10–12 mm (0.39–0.47 in) capsules.

Its fruiting spikes contain thousands of minute seeds.

=== Identification ===
Ivy broomrape closely resembles the more commonly distributed O. minor and both are able to parasitize members of the ivy family. O. hederae is primarily differentiated by its characteristically distally pinched corollas, the flowers extending over most of the stem, the long, acuminate floral bracts, and its large terminal 'bud' of unopened flowers that give the spike a pointed top. The stigma on O. hederae is usually yellow and the corolla is curved downwards and cream-colored.

== Ecology ==
Ivy broomrape primarily propagates by seeds which are dispersed by wind, but is also able to regenerate from small fragments of roots that remain in the soil. Many broomrape seeds show considerable abilities to remain dormant but viable for many years.

When germination occurs, the embryo of the seed sends out a thin thread-like filament that spirals away from the embryo and into the surrounding soils until it makes contact with ivy roots. The filament then penetrates xylem tissues which allows it to receive water, nutrients, and carbohydrates from its ivy host. The connection made with the host can be so complete that it's nearly impossible to tell with certainty where the epidermis of the host ends and where that of the parasite begins. In order for a seed to survive, this connection must occur within a few days of germination. Only once enough energy has been garnered will the plant send up a flower stalk and be visible above ground.

=== Host specificity ===
Ivy broomrape is an obligate parasite of ivy (Hedera) plants, primarily affecting English ivy, but, rarely, other species as well. It contains no chlorophyll of its own and seed germination is dependent on strigolactone root exudates of the host. Unlike more weedy species of broomrape like common broomrape, O. hederae exhibits very high host specificity based on germination measurements in response to kinds of strigolactone typical of various possible host plants.

This specialization is reflected in the plant's genome. Genome sequencing of O. hederae (ivy specialist), O. minor (generalist), and O. gracilis (legume specialist) revealed that while all three species share a highly conserved chromosome structure (synteny), O. hederae possesses a distinct set of genes related to host detection and physiological interaction, providing a genetic basis for its strict adaptation to ivy.

It is one of two parasitic plants associated with common ivy; the other being Osyris alba. However, osyris has a very wide host range while O. hederae's range is extremely narrow.

=== Ivy rhizobiome diversification ===
Hedera invasions in non-native environments pose an ecological risk by forming dense monocultures that may suffocate native vegetation. Because ivy can survive in extreme shade and climb trees and shrubs, ecological succession is unlikely to succeed it. Ivy's heavy production of triterpenoid saponins also contributes to "regressive succession" by inhibiting spore germination of ectomycorrhizal fungi. Over time this leads to a less diverse microbiome made up primarily of bacteria instead of fungi.

Metagenomic analysis has shown that ivy broomrape significantly diversifies the rhizosphere microbiome of their host. This likely happens through altering the ivy's root exudates and introducing new necromass from ivy broomrape's short-lived shoots and underground tubercles. The stunting of ivy's growth can also open up opportunities for other plants to grow in newly available patches and allow ecological succession to progress.

=== Seasonality ===
Pollen units are medium sized (26-50 μm) spheroidal monads. Flowering can take 2 years after infection to occur. However flowering is influenced by or coordinated with their host. Ivy broomrape sown onto an alien host like Tetrapanax was shown to flower in a single year. In Mediterranean climates it flowers from late April to mid July. In the UK, flowers are generally observed in June and July, June–August in the Netherlands, and in Ireland flowering generally occurs March–July. Flowering can vary widely and some sources even cite its flowering months to range from April to October.

== Distribution ==
Its native distribution matches that of its host, ivy, so it is mainly found in central and Northern Europe as well as parts of Asia.

In the US, it has been observed in a patch of invasive ivy at the University of California, Berkeley, near the life sciences building. It was purportedly introduced to the UC Berkeley campus by Robert Ornduff.

== Phylogeny ==
- - - - - Phelipanche (65 species)
        - O. minor — lesser broomrape
      - - O. picridis
        - O. crenata — bean broomrape
    - O. hederae
  - O. elatior — knapweed broomrape
- - - O. caryophyllacea — bedstraw broomrape
    - O. teucrii — germander broomrape
  - O. lutea — yellow broomrape

O. hederae is usually included in the "Orobanche" section of genus Orobanche, which contains about 120 species not counting Phelipanche species. Phylogenetic studies suggest the amethyst broomrape (O. amethystea) is its closest relative. O. amethystea primarily parasitizes field eryngo (Eryngium campestre) which is in the order Apiales.

== Uses ==
The Greek physician Dioscorides wrote that the plant, called ὀροβάγχη, can be eaten raw or cooked like asparagus and also stated that cooking the plant with pulses makes the pulses cook faster. While Dioscorides doesn't include medicinal information in his description, Russian and Northern folklore both describe the plant as highly medicinal.

A review of literature of traditional use of Orobanche shows that while broomrapes were used as food and medicine throughout regions of the world, this usage mainly happened in China and North America. While in Europe, they were primarily used as food items only.

== Gallery ==
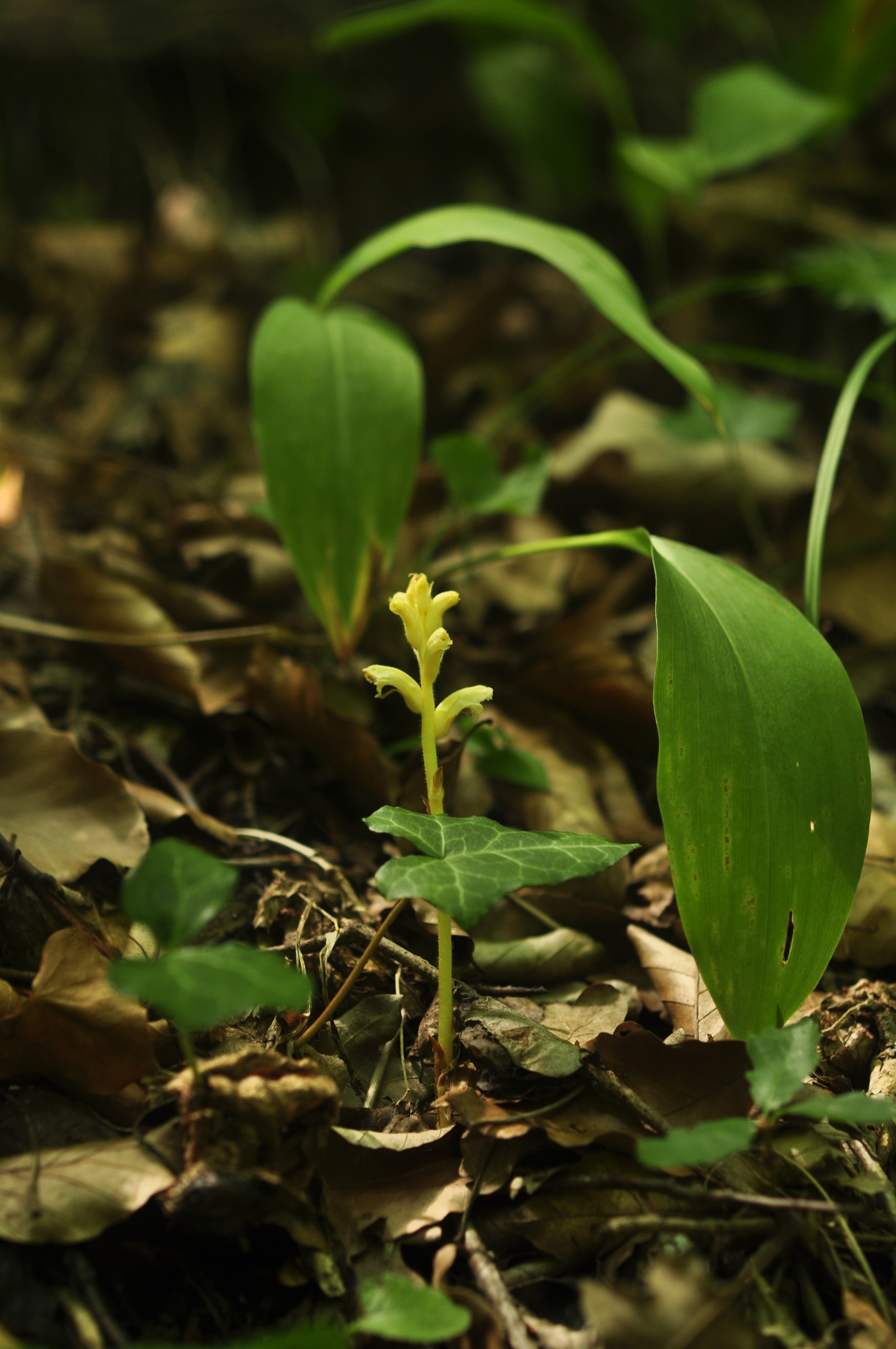

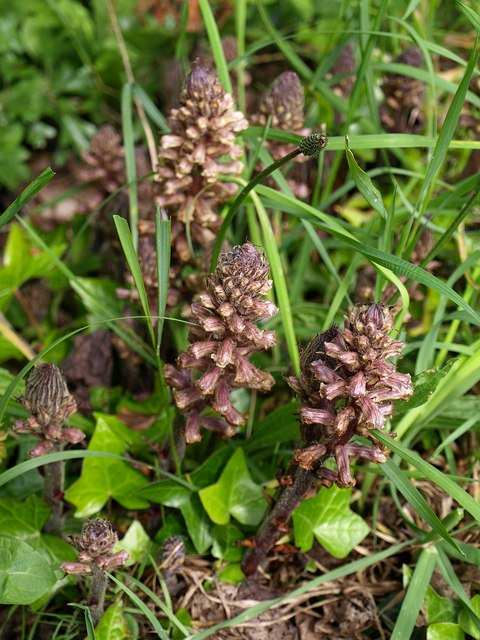

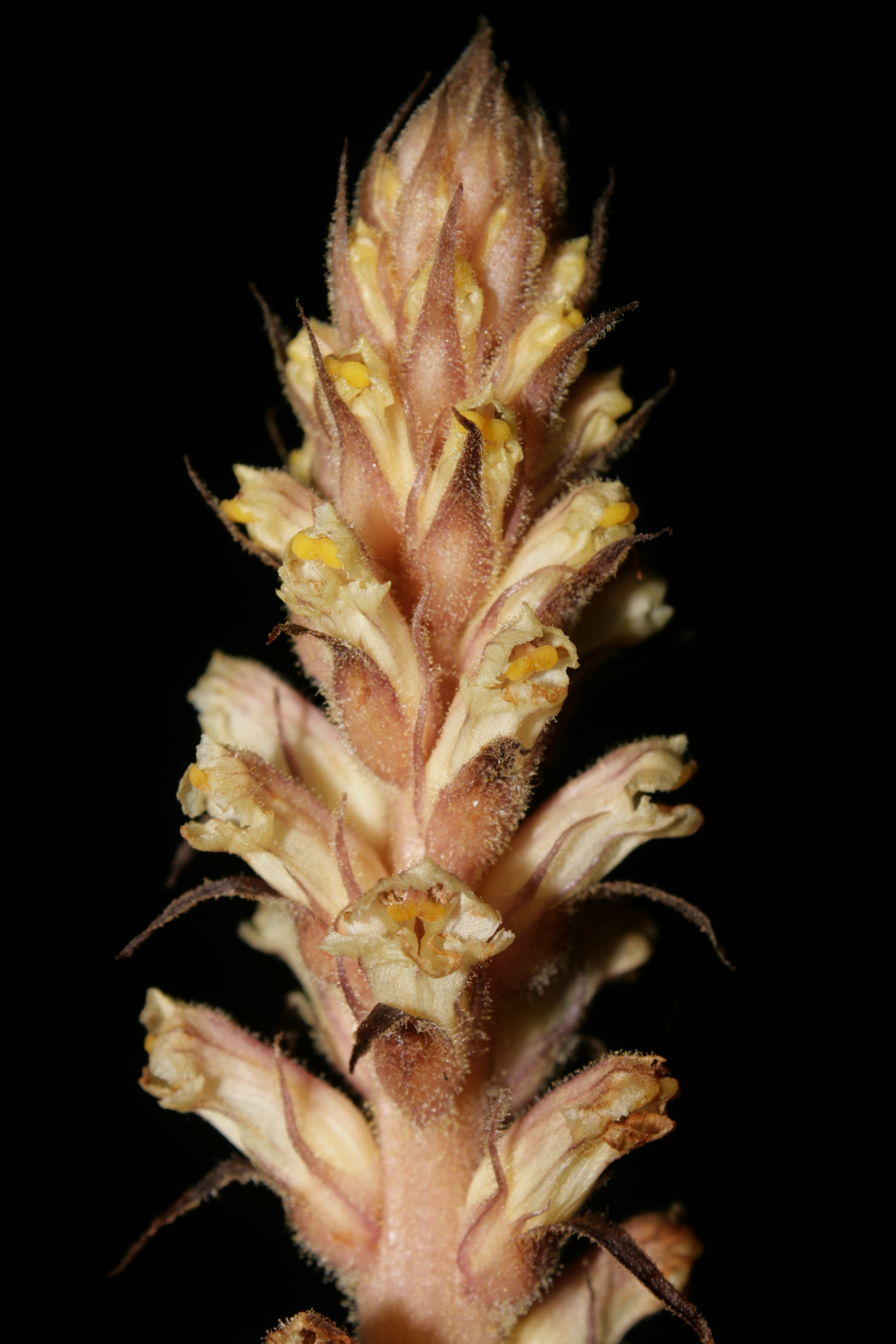

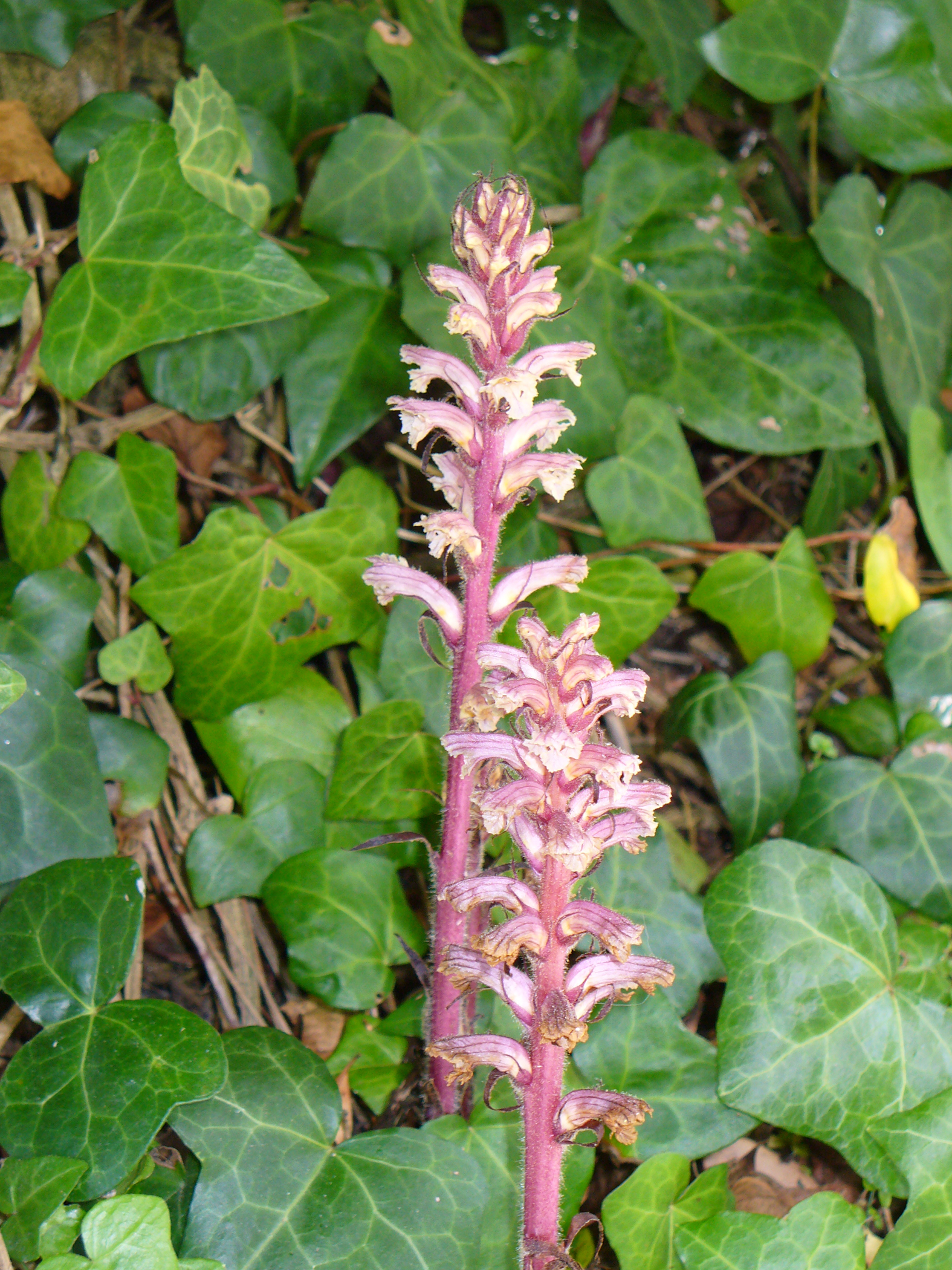

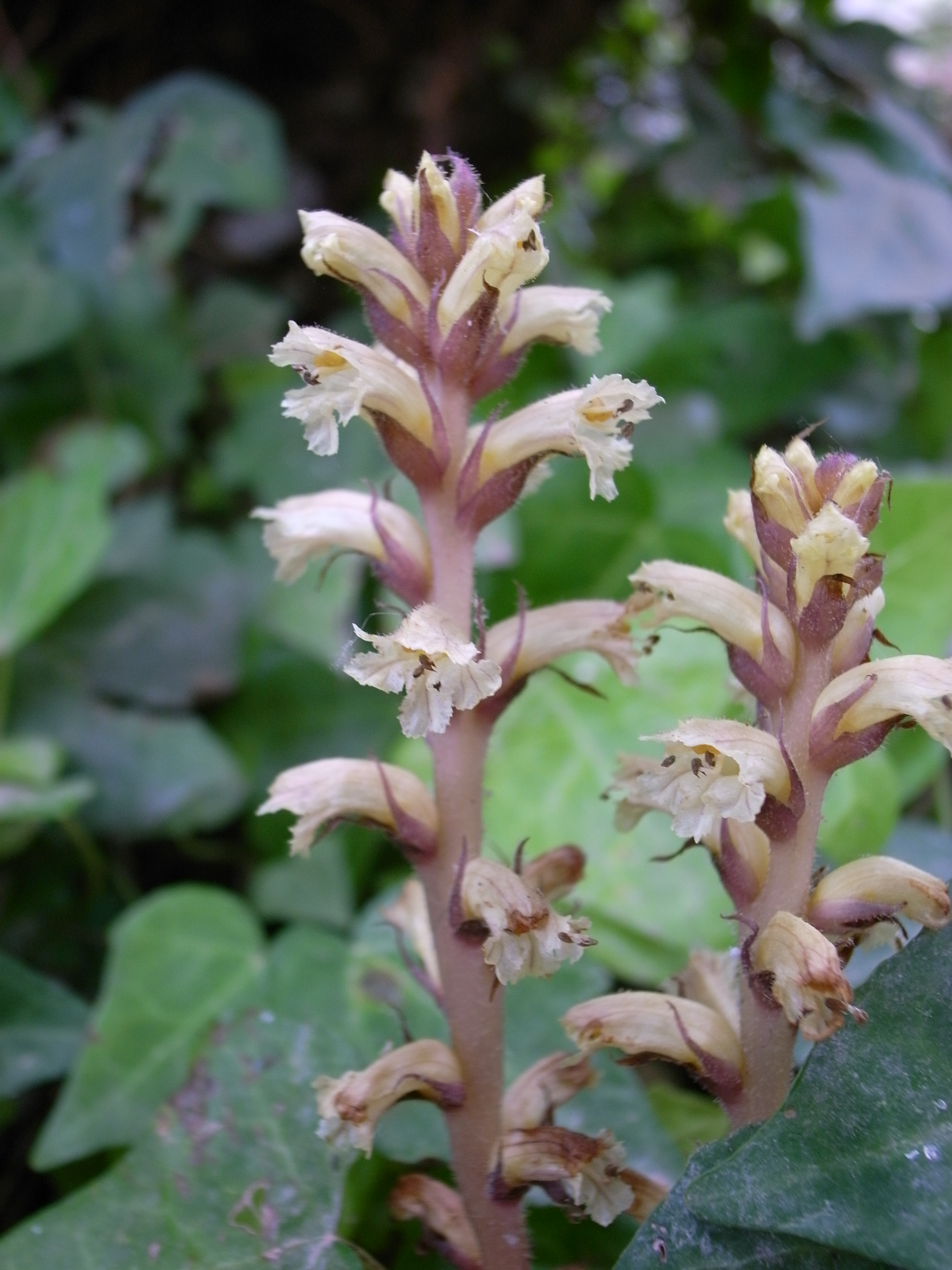

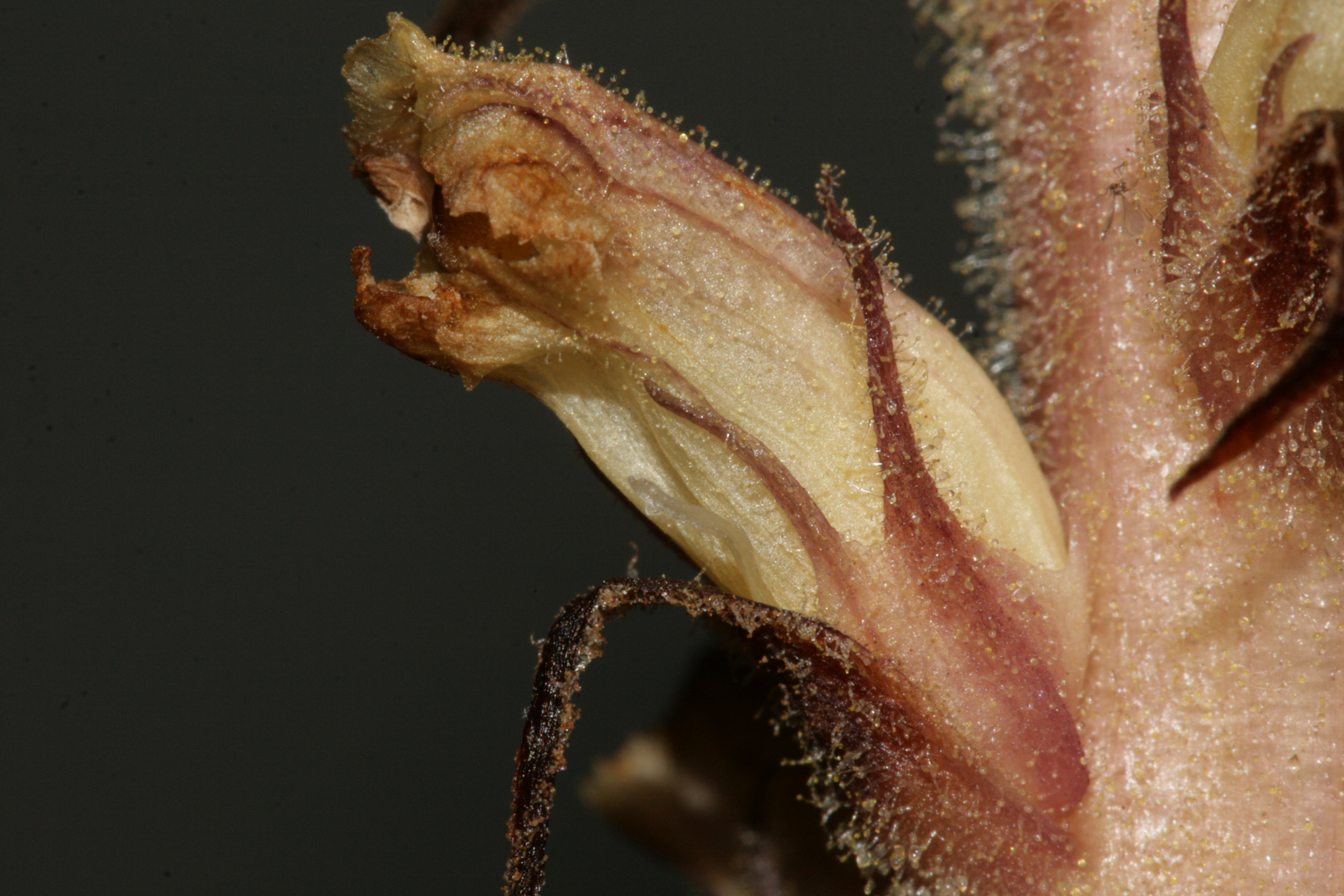

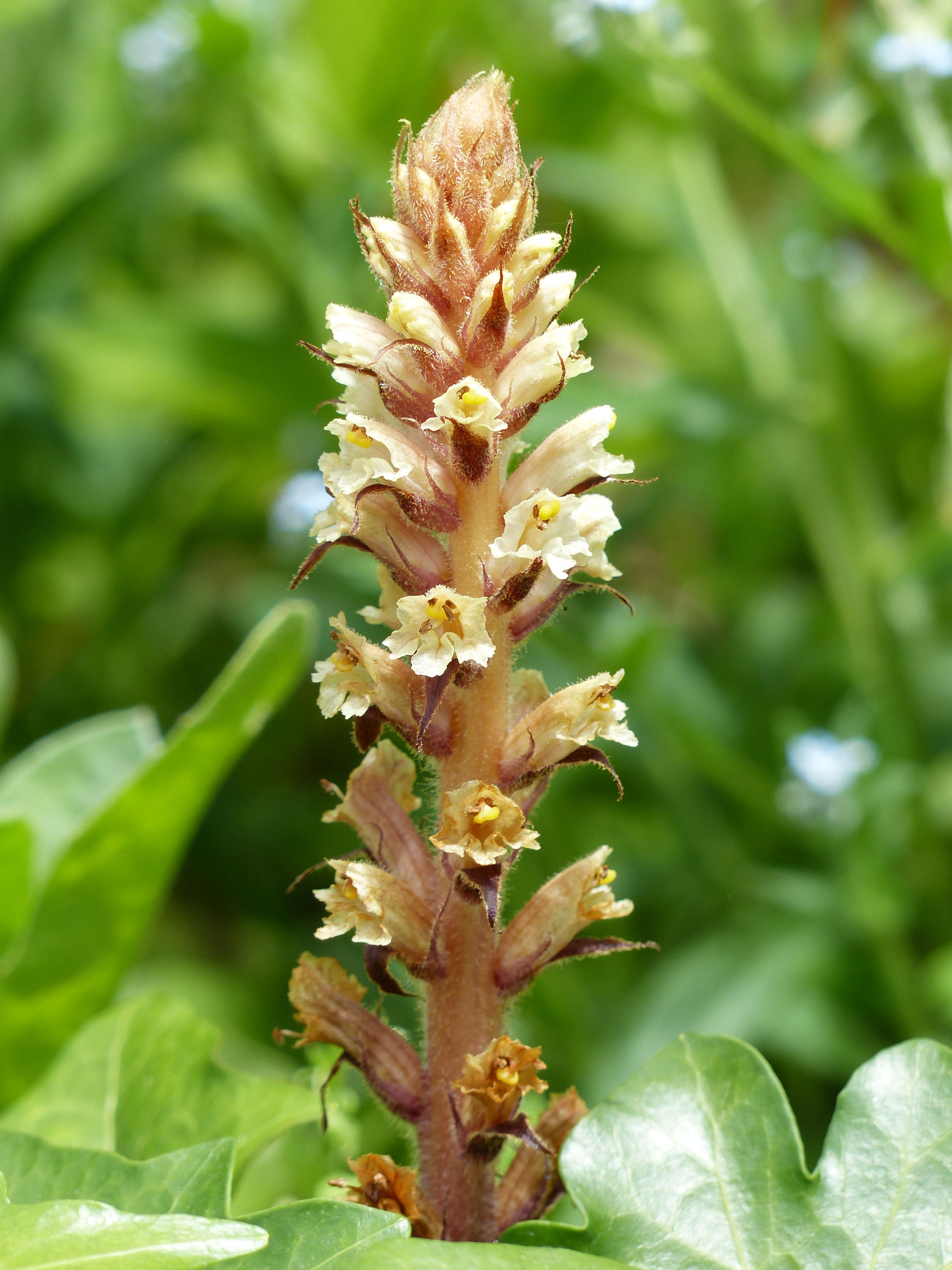
