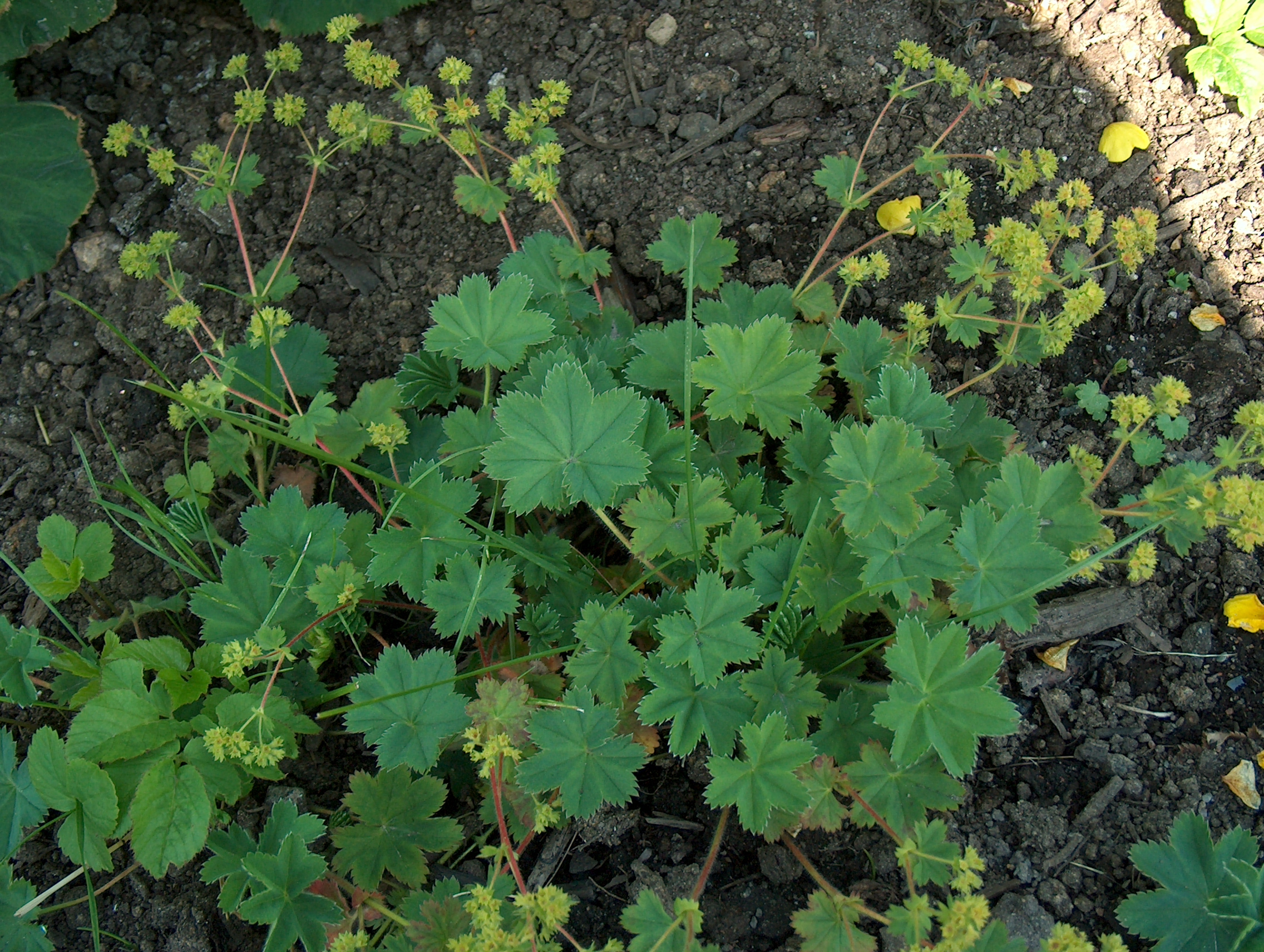

Scientific classification
- Kingdom: Plantae
- Clade: Tracheophytes
- Clade: Angiosperms
- Clade: Eudicots
- Clade: Rosids
- Order: Rosales
- Family: Rosaceae
- Genus: Alchemilla
- Species: A. glaucescens

Binomial name
- Alchemilla glaucescens Wallr., 1840

= Alchemilla glaucescens =

Species of flowering plant

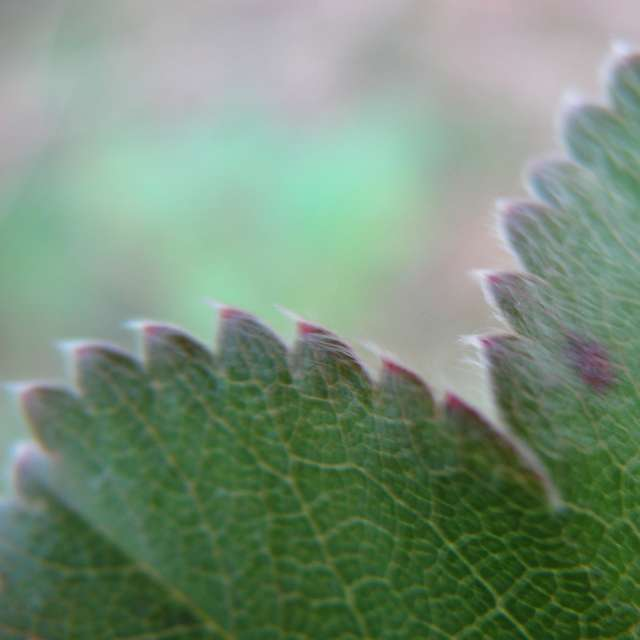
Alchemilla glaucescens leaf surface and margin with long soft hairs

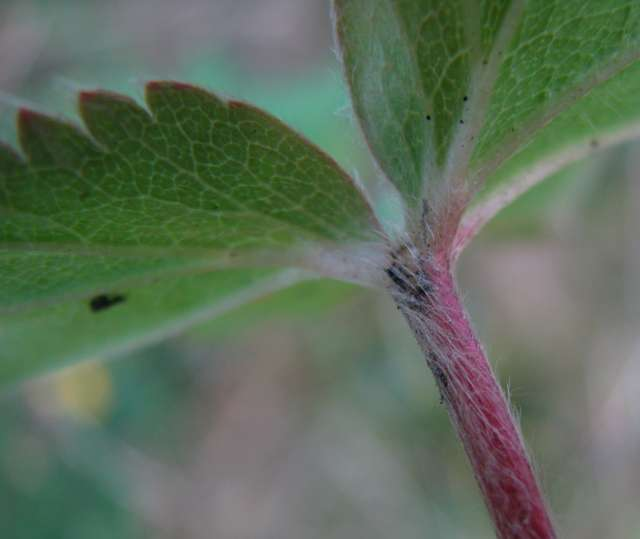
Alchemilla glaucescens leaf stalk with long soft hairs

Alchemilla glaucescens is a species of plants belonging to the family Rosaceae.

It is native to Europe.
