= Lommán of Trim =

Irish saint

Lommán mac Dalláin (fl. 5th—early 6th century) was a saint and patron of Trim, County Meath in Ireland.

== Cenél Lóegairi, Trim and Armagh ==
Trim (Áth Truimm -'ford of the elderflowers') was the foremost church in the petty kingdom of the Cenél Lóegairi, originally belonging to a cadet branch of that dynasty. In the early 8th century, however, the patronage of the church came under serious strain as power shifts occurred within the main ruling branch. Between the early 8th and mid-9th century, descendants of Colmán mac Duib Duin ruled the monastery. The cadet branch appears to have negotiated the position of the saint, turning to St Patrick's church in Armagh for mediation. By way of compromise, Lommán was drawn into the dossier of St Patrick as someone biologically related and subordinate to that saint. An 8th-century text in the Book of Armagh first attests to Lommán's new status. It states that through his mother, Lommán was a kinsman of the saint as well as of a number of other local saints of the 5th century, including Munis (buried in Forgney) and Mo Genóc (Mugenóc) of Cell Duma Glind (Kilglyn). According to the foundation story, Lommán joined St Patrick on his voyage to Ireland, landing at the estuary of the Boyne (according to Muirchú, at Inber Colpthai), and continued in his ship as far as Trim, where he founded the monastery.

The Patrician influence is also attested in a later gloss to the Martyrology of Tallaght, which identifies Lommán as porter ((h)ostiarius) to St Patrick.

== Tripartite Life ==
Although the cadet branch in control of Lommán's church lost out, Lommán remained an element of St Patrick's cult, notably re-appearing in the Tripartite Life of Patrick, written in the 10th century. It tells that Lommán was a nephew of Patrick, his mother being a sister of Patrick and that his brothers were Munis, Broccaid of Imliuch Ech, Broccán and Mo Genóc. When at Patrick's instructions, the saint rowed to Trim, he arrived at the fortress belonging to the local ruler Feidlimid son of Lóegaire mac Néill. He first converted Feidlimid's son Foirtchernn (Fortchern) and subsequently, Feidlimid himself, whose wife, named Scoth (Scotnoe), was the daughter of the British king. Feidlimid welcomed the saint and granted him Trim, where Patrick founded a monastery and left it in Lommán's charge. Foirtchernn became his foster son and with him, he visited his brother Broccaid towards the end of his life. Lommán bequeathed the church to both Patrick and Foirtchernn. Foirtchernn, though initially reluctant, accepted and after the death of his foster father, held the abbey for only three days, transferring it to the pilgrim Cathlaid in his stead.

== Death and Veneration ==
His feast day was observed on 17 February and on 11 October.
