= Flora of Lebanon =

Plant species of Lebanon

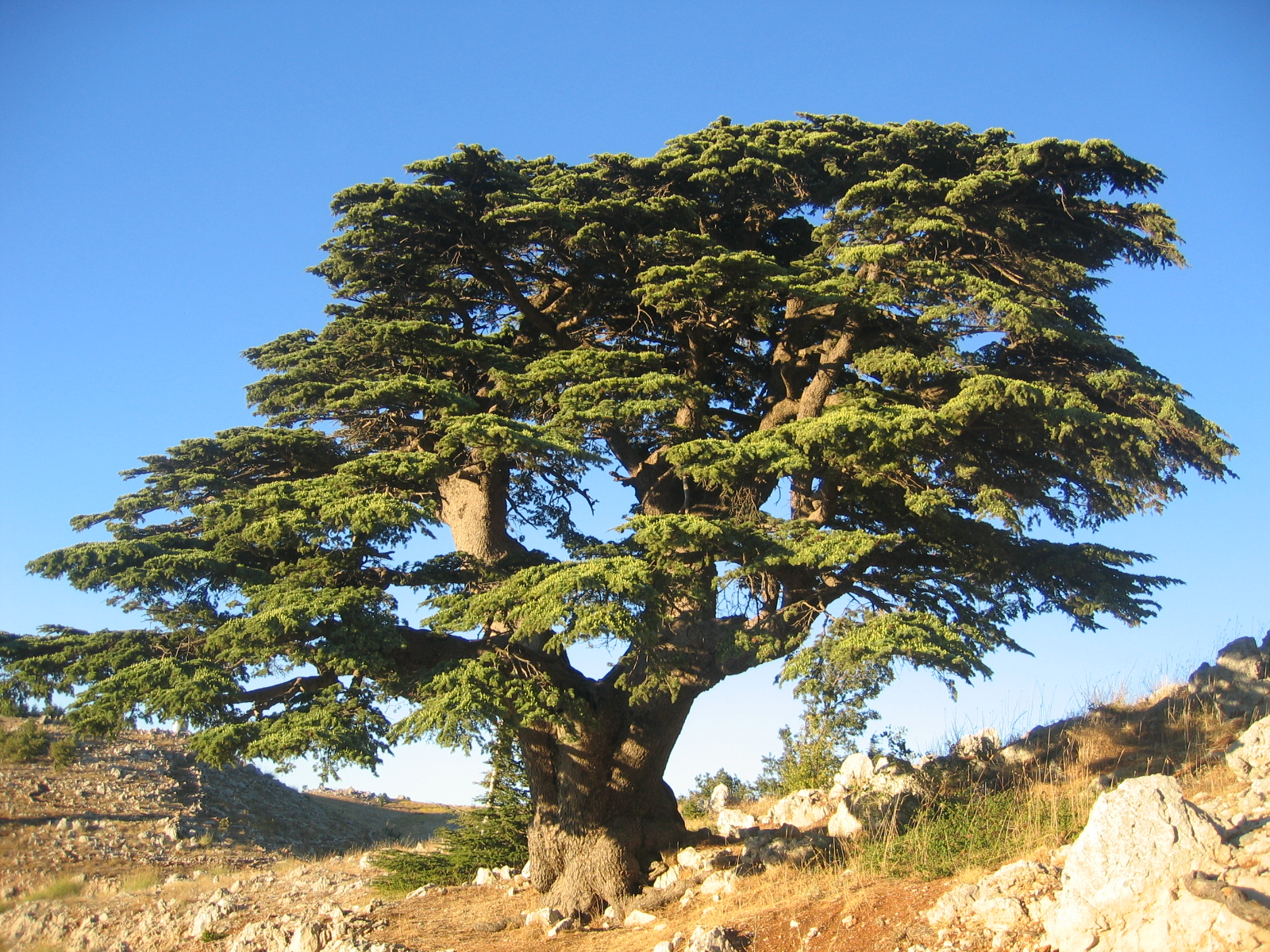
The emblematic Lebanon cedar (Cedrus libani) in Al Shouf Cedar Nature Reserve.

The flora of Lebanon includes approximately 2,600 plant species. Situated on the eastern coast of the Mediterranean Basin, Lebanon is a reservoir of plant diversity and one of the world's biodiversity hotspots for conservation priorities. Endemic species constitute 12% of the Lebanese flora; 221 plant species are broad endemics and 90 are narrow endemics. Important Plant Areas (IPAs) featuring the country exceptional botanical richness were defined in 2018.

The natural vegetation of Lebanon has been threatened by overexploitation and fragmentation as a result of urban expansion, overgrazing, tourism and the impact of warfare. The cedar of Lebanon is the national symbol of the country; growing in the Lebanon Mountain range, these trees have been heavily harvested over the years for their valuable timber and few mature trees still remain. Nevertheless, Lebanon is more heavily wooded than most other countries in the region and pine, oak, fir, beech, cypress and juniper are to be found in the mountain areas although the Beqaa valley has little tree cover. Where timber has been extracted and woodland destroyed, scrub has taken over; in the Lebanon Mountain area this is mostly Ceratonia, oak and Pistacia, and in the Anti-Lebanon range the scrub is mostly Pistacia and wild almond. Other native trees such as the Lebanese wild apple, Judas tree and Syrian maple are being grown experimentally as a conservation strategy to see if they are amenable to container production.

The Al Shouf Cedar Nature Reserve was established in 1996 to preserve an old stand of cedar in central Lebanon. It covers 550 km^{2} (212 mi^{2}), which is 5.3% of the country's total area, and includes 620 hectares (1,500 acres) of cedar forest which, with the exclusion of livestock is successfully regenerating. There are 24 kinds of tree in the reserve and 436 species of plant, including about 48 which are endemic to Lebanon, Syria and Turkey.

Apart from trees, there are a large number of flowering plants, ferns and mosses in the country. Many of the plants bloom after the winter rains, and the annual plants germinate at this time, grow, flower and set seed while the soil is moist enough to support them. One plant endemic to the country is the endangered Lebanon violet, found high up in rocky shrubland on the west side of Mount Lebanon.

== A ==
- Abies cilicica
- Acantholimon acerosum
- Acantholimon antilibanoticum
- Acantholimon damassanum
- Acantholimon echinus subsp. creticum
- Acantholimon libanoticum
- Acantholimon lycaonicum
- Acantholimon ulicinum
- Acanthophyllum kurdicum
- Acanthus hirsutus subsp. syriacus
- Acer cinerascentiforme
- Acer hyrcanum subsp. tauricolum
- Acer monspessulanum subsp. microphyllum
- Acer obtusifolium
- Achillea aleppica
- Achillea arabica
- Achillea distans subsp. tanacetifolia
- Achillea falcata
- Achillea fragrantissima
- Achillea kotschyi
- Achillea maritima
- Achillea membranacea
- Achillea millefolium
- Achillea santolinoides subsp. wilhelmsii
- Achnatherum bromoides
- Adenocarpus complicatus
- Adiantum capillus-veneris
- Adonis aestivalis
- Adonis aestivalis subsp. squarrosa
- Adonis aleppica
- Adonis annua var. cupaniana
- Adonis dentata subsp. persica
- Adonis flammea
- Adonis microcarpa
- Adonis microcarpa subsp. cretica
- Adonis palaestina
- Aegilops bicornis
- Aegilops caudata
- Aegilops columnaris
- Aegilops crassa var. crassa
- Aegilops cylindrica
- Aegilops geniculata
- Aegilops juvenalis
- Aegilops kotschyi
- Aegilops longissima
- Aegilops lorentii
- Aegilops neglecta
- Aegilops peregrina
- Aegilops searsii
- Aegilops speltoides subsp. ligustica
- Aegilops speltoides subsp. speltoides
- Aegilops tauschii
- Aegilops triuncialis
- Aegilops umbellulata
- Aegilops vavilovii
- Aegilops ventricosa
- Aegilotriticum loretii
- Aegilotriticum triticoides
- Aeluropus lagopoides
- Aeluropus littoralis
- Aethionema coridifolium
- Agrimonia eupatoria
- Agrimonia repens
- Agrostemma githago
- Agrostis castellana
- Agrostis olympica
- Agrostis stolonifera
- Aira elegantissima
- Ajuga chamaepitys subsp. rechingeri
- Ajuga chamaepitys subsp. chia
- Ajuga chamaepitys subsp. glareosa
- Ajuga chamaepitys subsp. laevigata
- Ajuga chamaepitys subsp. libanotica
- Ajuga chamaepitys subsp. mesogitana
- Ajuga chamaepitys subsp. palaestina
- Ajuga chamaepitys subsp. tridactylites
- Ajuga chasmophila
- Ajuga orientalis
- Ajuga vestita
- Alcea acaulis
- Alcea apterocarpa
- Alcea damascena
- Alcea digitata
- Alcea dissecta
- Alcea kurdica subsp. coelesyriaca
- Alcea setosa
- Alchemilla diademata
- Alhagi maurorum
- Alisma lanceolatum
- Alisma plantago-aquatica
- Alkanna kotschyana
- Alkanna leiocarpa
- Alkanna maleolens
- Alkanna orientalis
- Alkanna prasinophylla
- Alkanna strigosa
- Alkanna tinctoria
- Allium affine
- Allium ampeloprasum
- Allium ampeloprasum var. leucanthum
- Allium ascalonicum
- Allium asclepiadeum
- Allium atroviolaceum
- Allium azaurenum
- Allium basalticum
- Allium bassitense
- Allium birkinshawii
- Allium calyptratum
- Allium carmeli
- Allium cassium
- Allium chloranthum
- Allium chloranthum var. montanum
- Allium chrysantherum
- Allium colchicifolium
- Allium curtum subsp. palaestinum
- Allium damascenum
- Allium daninianum
- Allium deserti-syriaci
- Allium dictyoprasum
- Allium drusorum
- Allium dumetorum
- Allium erdelii
- Allium feinbergii
- Allium hamrinense
- Allium hermoneum
- Allium karyeteini
- Allium kharputense
- Allium libani
- Allium longisepalum
- Allium lycaonicum
- Allium machmelianum
- Allium macrochaetum
- Allium meronense
- Allium multibulbosum
- Allium myrianthum
- Allium neapolitanum
- Allium nigrum
- Allium noeanum
- Allium olivieri
- Allium opacum
- Allium orientale
- Allium pallens
- Allium paniculatum
- Allium phanerantherum
- Allium pseudocalyptratum
- Allium pseudophanerantherum
- Allium pseudostamineum
- Allium qasyunense
- Allium rothii
- Allium rotundum
- Allium rupicola
- Allium sannineum
- Allium sativum
- Allium schergianum
- Allium schubertii
- Allium scorodoprasum
- Allium sindjarense
- Allium sphaerocephalon subsp. arvense
- Allium sphaerocephalon subsp. sphaerocephalon
- Allium sprengeri
- Allium stamineum
- Allium subhirsutum
- Allium trachycoleum
- Allium trifoliatum
- Allium truncatum
- Allium vineale
- Allium wiedemannianum
- Allium zebdanense
- Alnus orientalis
- Alopecurus arundinaceus
- Alopecurus gerardii
- Alopecurus myosuroides
- Alopecurus textilis
- Alopecurus utriculatus
- Alopecurus vaginatus
- Althaea bertramii
- Althaea cannabina
- Althaea officinalis
- Alyssum baumgartnerianum
- Alyssum condensatum
- Alyssum contemptum
- Alyssum mouradicum
- Alyssum murale
- Alyssum repens
- Alyssum stribrnyi
- Amaranthus blitoides
- Amaranthus hybridus
- Amaranthus retroflexus
- Amelanchier ovalis
- Ammi majus
- Ammochloa palaestina
- Ammophila arenaria
- Ammophila arenaria subsp. australis
- Anacamptis collina
- Anacamptis coriophora
- Anacamptis laxiflora
- Anacamptis morio subsp. syriaca
- Anacamptis papilionacea
- Anacamptis pyramidalis
- Anacamptis sancta
- Anacyclus clavatus
- Anacyclus nigellifolius
- Anacyclus radiatus
- Anarrhinum forskaohlii
- Anchonium billardieri
- Anchusa azurea
- Anchusa hybrida
- Anchusa strigosa
- Andrachne telephioides
- Androcymbium palaestinum
- Andropogon distachyos
- Androsace maxima
- Androsace multiscapa
- Androsace villosa
- Andryala dentata
- Andryala integrifolia
- Anemone blanda
- Anemone coronaria var. phoenicia
- Anemone coronaria var.cyanea
- Anethum graveolens
- Aneura pinguis
- Anisosciadium tenuifolium subsp. sibthorpianum
- Ankyropetalum coelesyriacum
- Ankyropetalum gypsophiloides
- Anogramma leptophylla
- Anthemis breviradiata
- Anthemis chia
- Anthemis cotula
- Anthemis cretica
- Anthemis cretica subsp. cassia var. discoidea
- Anthemis didymaea
- Anthemis haussknechtii
- Anthemis hebronica
- Anthemis hermonsis
- Anthemis hyalina
- Anthemis patentissima
- Anthemis pauciloba
- Anthemis pseudocotula
- Anthemis rascheyana
- Anthemis scariosa
- Anthemis secundiramea
- Anthemis tripolitana
- Anthoceros punctatus
- Anthoxanthum odoratum
- Anthriscus lamprocarpa
- Antinoria insularis
- Apera interrupta
- Aphanes arvensis
- Arabidopsis thaliana
- Arabis aucheri
- Arabis caucasica
- Arabis nova
- Arabis verna
- Arbutus andrachne
- Arbutus unedo
- Arceuthobium oxycedri
- Arctium minus subsp. pubens
- Arenaria deflexa
- Arenaria deflexa subsp. pubescens
- Arenaria fragillima
- Arenaria leptoclados
- Arenaria libanotica
- Arenaria pamphylica
- Argentina anserina
- Arisarum vulgare subsp. vulgare
- Arisarum vulgare var. veslingii
- Aristida adscensionis
- Aristolochia billardieri
- Aristolochia bottae
- Aristolochia maurorum
- Aristolochia paecilantha
- Aristolochia parviflora
- Aristolochia pontica
- Aristolochia sempervirens (Syn. Aristolochia altissima)
- Armeria undulata
- Arrhenatherum elatius
- Arrhenatherum kotschyi
- Arrhenatherum palaestinum
- Artedia squamata
- Artemisia arborescens
- Artemisia monosperma
- Artemisia scoparia
- Artemisia verlotiorum
- Arthrocnemum macrostachyum
- Arum dioscoridis var. cyprium
- Arum dioscoridis var. philistaeum
- Arum dioscoridis var. syriacum
- Arum elongatum
- Arum gratum
- Arum hygrophilum
- Arum palaestinum
- Arum rupicola var. rupicola (Arum conophalloides Kotschy ex Schott)
- Arum rupicola var. virescens
- Arundo donax
- Arundo micrantha
- Asparagus acutifolius
- Asparagus aphyllus
- Asparagus aphyllus subsp. orientalis
- Asparagus filifolius
- Asparagus horridus
- Asparagus trichophyllus
- Asperugo procumbens
- Asperula arvensis
- Asperula bargyli
- Asperula breviflora
- Asperula cymulosa
- Asperula glareosa
- Asperula glomerata
- Asperula libanotica
- Asperula orientalis
- Asperula semanensis
- Asperula setosa
- Asperula stricta
- Asphodeline baytopiae
- Asphodeline brevicaulis
- Asphodeline brevicaulis subsp. druzorum
- Asphodeline brevicaulis var.edumea
- Asphodeline damascena
- Asphodeline globifera
- Asphodeline lutea
- Asphodeline recurva
- Asphodelus fistulosus
- Asphodelus ramosus subsp. ramosus
- Asphodelus tenuifolius
- Asphodelus viscidulus
- Asplenium bourgaei
- Asplenium ceterach
- Asplenium lepidum
- Asplenium lepidum subsp. haussknechtii
- Asplenium onopteris
- Asplenium ruta-muraria
- Asplenium sagittatum
- Asplenium scolopendrium
- Asplenium trichomanes
- Asteriscus aquaticus
- Astomaea seselifolia
- Astragalus aduncus
- Astragalus aleppicus
- Astragalus angulosus
- Astragalus angulosus subsp. heliopolitanus
- Astragalus angustifolius
- Astragalus angustifolius subsp. postianus
- Astragalus annularis
- Astragalus antilibani
- Astragalus argyrothamnos
- Astragalus asterias
- Astragalus barbatus
- Astragalus berytheus
- Astragalus bethlehemiticus
- Astragalus boeticus
- Astragalus brachystachys
- Astragalus campylorhynchus
- Astragalus caprinus subsp. caprinus
- Astragalus cedreti
- Astragalus cephalotes
- Astragalus cilicius
- Astragalus coluteoides
- Astragalus crenatus
- Astragalus cruentiflorus
- Astragalus drusorum
- Astragalus echinatus
- Astragalus echinops
- Astragalus echinus
- Astragalus ehdenensis
- Astragalus ehrenbergii
- Astragalus emarginatus
- Astragalus epiglottis
- Astragalus eriocarpus
- Astragalus gossypinus
- Astragalus gummifer
- Astragalus guttatus
- Astragalus hamosus
- Astragalus hispidus
- Astragalus kotschyanus
- Astragalus kurnet-es-saudae
- Astragalus lanatus
- Astragalus macrocarpus subsp. macrocarpus
- Astragalus macrocephalus subsp. cucullaris
- Astragalus mollis
- Astragalus nummularius subsp. trichopterus
- Astragalus oleaefolius
- Astragalus palaestinus
- Astragalus pelecinus
- Astragalus pinetorum
- Astragalus psilodontius
- Astragalus roussaeanus
- Astragalus schizopterus
- Astragalus spinosus
- Astragalus suberosus
- Astragalus trachoniticus
- Astragalus tribuloides
- Astragalus trifoliolatus
- Astragalus triradiatus
- Astragalus zachlensis
- Astrodaucus orientalis
- Asyneuma rigidum
- Asyneuma virgatum
- Athyrium filix-femina
- Atocion reuterianum
- Atractylis cancellata
- Atraphaxis billardierei
- Atraphaxis spinosa
- Atriplex halimus
- Atriplex lasiantha
- Atriplex portulacoides
- Atriplex prostrata subsp. calotheca
- Aubrieta libanotica
- Avena barbata
- Avena clauda
- Avena eriantha
- Avena fatua
- Avena sativa
- Avena sterilis subsp. ludoviciana
- Avena sterilis subsp. sterilis

== B ==
- Baldellia ranunculoides
- Ballota antilibanotica
- Ballota byblensis
- Ballota damascena
- Ballota nigra
- Ballota nigra subsp. ruderalis
- Ballota saxatilis
- Ballota undulata
- Barbarea macrocarpa
- Barbilophozia barbata
- Bassia monticola
- Bazzania flaccida
- Beckmannia eruciformis
- Bellardia trixago
- Bellevalia densiflora
- Bellevalia douinii
- Bellevalia flexuosa
- Bellevalia hermonis
- Bellevalia longipes
- Bellevalia macrobotrys
- Bellevalia mosheovii
- Bellevalia nivalis
- Bellevalia palmyrensis
- Bellevalia stepporum var. edumea
- Bellevalia stepporum var. stepporum
- Bellevalia trifoliata
- Bellevalia warburgii
- Bellis annua
- Bellis perennis
- Bellis sylvestris
- Berberis libanotica
- Berula erecta
- Beta vulgaris
- Biarum aleppicum
- Biarum angustatum
- Biarum auraniticum
- Biarum bovei
- Biarum carduchorum
- Biarum crispulum
- Biarum pyrami
- Biarum syriacum
- Bidens pilosa (introduced)
- Biebersteinia multifida
- Bifora testiculata
- Bilacunaria boissieri
- Bilacunaria microcarpa
- Biscutella ciliata
- Biscutella didyma subsp. apula
- Blackstonia acuminata
- Blackstonia perfoliata
- Blechnum spicant
- Blepharostoma trichophyllum
- Blysmus compressus
- Bolanthus filicaulis
- Bolanthus frankenioides
- Bolanthus hirsutus
- Bolboschoenus glaucus (syn.Scirpus tuberosus)
- Bolboschoenus maritimus subsp. maritimus
- Bongardia chrysogonum
- Borago officinalis
- Bothriochloa ischaemum
- Brachypodium distachyon
- Brachypodium pinnatum
- Brachypodium retusum
- Brachypodium sylvaticum
- Briza humilis
- Briza maxima
- Briza minor
- Bromus alopecuros subsp. alopecuros
- Bromus alopecuros subsp. caroli-henrici
- Bromus arenarius
- Bromus arvensis
- Bromus bikfayensis
- Bromus brachystachys
- Bromus catharticus
- Bromus chrysopogon
- Bromus danthoniae
- Bromus diandrus
- Bromus erectus
- Bromus fasciculatus
- Bromus hordeaceus
- Bromus intermedius
- Bromus japonicus subsp. anatolicus
- Bromus japonicus subsp. japonicus
- Bromus lanceolatus
- Bromus madritensis
- Bromus pseudobrachystachys
- Bromus pumilio
- Bromus rigidus
- Bromus rubens
- Bromus scoparius
- Bromus secalinus
- Bromus squarrosus
- Bromus sterilis
- Bromus syriacus
- Bromus tectorum
- Bromus tomentellus
- Brunnera orientalis
- Bryonia cretica
- Bryonia multiflora
- Bryonia syriaca
- Bufonia ephedrina var. minor
- Bufonia paniculata
- Bufonia virgata
- Buglossoides arvensis
- Buglossoides incrassata
- Buglossoides sibthorpiana
- Buglossoides tenuiflora
- Bungea trifida
- Bunium elegans
- Bunium ferulaceum
- Bunium hermonis
- Bunium paucifolium
- Bunium pestolazzae
- Bupleurum brevicaule
- Bupleurum cappadocicum
- Bupleurum dichotomum
- Bupleurum falcatum
- Bupleurum fruticosum
- Bupleurum gerardii
- Bupleurum gracile
- Bupleurum intermedium
- Bupleurum kurdicum
- Bupleurum lancifolium
- Bupleurum libanoticum
- Bupleurum nodiflorum
- Bupleurum odontites
- Bupleurum papillosum
- Bupleurum postii
- Butomus umbellatus

== C ==
- Cachrys boissieri
- Cakile maritima subsp. maritima
- Calamagrostis epigejos
- Calamagrostis pseudophragmites
- Calendula arvensis
- Calendula palaestina
- Calicotome villosa
- Callipeltis cucullaris
- Callipeltis factorovskyi
- Callitriche mouterdei
- Callitriche nafiolskyi
- Callitriche truncata subsp. occidentalis
- Calypogeia azurea
- Calypogeia fissa
- Calypogeia muelleriana
- Calystegia sepium
- Campanula antilibanotica
- Campanula buseri
- Campanula camptoclada
- Campanula coriacea
- Campanula cymbalaria
- Campanula damascena
- Campanula erinus
- Campanula euclasta
- Campanula fastigiata
- Campanula flaccidula
- Campanula hierosolymitana
- Campanula kotschyana
- Campanula peregrina
- Campanula phrygia
- Campanula postii
- Campanula propinqua
- Campanula rapunculus
- Campanula rapunculus subsp. lambertiana
- Campanula rapunculus var. spiciformis
- Campanula retrorsa
- Campanula reuteriana
- Campanula sidoniensis
- Campanula stellaris
- Campanula stricta
- Campanula stricta var. libanotica
- Campanula strigosa
- Campanula sulphurea
- Campanula trachelium subsp. trachelium
- Campanula trichopoda
- Capparis spinosa
- Capparis spinosa var. canescens
- Capparis spinosa var. parviflora
- Cardamine graeca
- Cardamine uliginosa
- Cardopatium corymbosum
- Carduus acicularis
- Carduus argentatus
- Carduus pycnocephalus
- Carduus pycnocephalus subsp. albidus
- Carduus pycnocephalus subsp. cinereus
- Carduus pycnocephalus subsp. pycnocephalus
- Carex acuta
- Carex diluta subsp. diluta (syn. Carex extensa)
- Carex distans subsp. distans
- Carex divisa
- Carex divulsa
- Carex echinata subsp. echinata
- Carex flacca
- Carex flacca subsp. erythrostachys
- Carex leersii
- Carex mediterranea
- Carex otrubae
- Carex pallescens
- Carex pendula
- Carex pseudocyperus var. pseudocyperus
- Carex remota subsp. remota
- Carex riparia subsp. riparia
- Carex sylvatica subsp. sylvatica
- Carlina curetum subsp. orientalis
- Carlina curetum var. montana
- Carlina frigida subsp. renatae
- Carlina involucrata
- Carlina lanata
- Carlina libanotica
- Carthamus caeruleus
- Carthamus glaucus
- Carthamus glaucus subsp. glandulosus
- Carthamus glaucus subsp. glaucus
- Carthamus nitidus
- Carthamus persicus
- Carthamus tenuis
- Carthamus tenuis subsp. gracillimus
- Carthamus tenuis subsp. tenuis
- Carthamus tinctorius
- Carum polyphyllum
- Castanea sativa
- Catabrosa aquatica
- Catananche lutea
- Catapodium marinum
- Catapodium rigidum var. majus
- Caucalis daucoides
- Caucalis platycarpos
- Cedrus libani var. libani
- Celtis australis (ميس)
- Celtis australis subsp. australis
- Celtis planchoniana
- Cenchrus ciliaris
- Cenchrus echinatus
- Cenchrus setaceus
- Centaurea ainetensis
- Centaurea ammocyanus
- Centaurea babylonica
- Centaurea behen
- Centaurea benedicta
- Centaurea calcitrapa
- Centaurea cheirolopha
- Centaurea cyanoides
- Centaurea cyanus
- Centaurea damascena
- Centaurea drabifolia
- Centaurea dumulosa
- Centaurea eryngioides
- Centaurea heterocarpa
- Centaurea hololeuca
- Centaurea hyalolepis
- Centaurea iberica
- Centaurea iberica subsp. hermonis
- Centaurea iberica subsp. iberica
- Centaurea iberica subsp. meryonis
- Centaurea longispina
- Centaurea microcnicus
- Centaurea mouterdei
- Centaurea pallescens
- Centaurea onopordifolia
- Centaurea postii
- Centaurea procurrens
- Centaurea reducta
- Centaurea rigida
- Centaurea simulans
- Centaurea solstitialis
- Centaurea speciosa
- Centaurea triumfetti
- Centaurea verutum
- Centaurea virgata
- Centaurium erythraea
- Centaurium erythraea var. erythraea
- Centaurium erythraea var. laxum
- Centaurium maritimum
- Centaurium pulchellum
- Centaurium spicatum
- Centaurium tenuiflorum
- Centranthus longiflorus
- Centranthus longiflorus var. latifolius
- Centropodia forsskalii subsp. forsskalii
- Cephalanthera damasonium
- Cephalanthera longifolia
- Cephalanthera rubra
- Cephalaria balansae
- Cephalaria cedrorum
- Cephalaria joppensis
- Cephalaria joppica
- Cephalaria kesruanica
- Cephalaria setosa
- Cephalaria stellipilis
- Cephalaria syriaca
- Cephalozia bicuspidata
- Cephaloziella baumgartneri
- Cephaloziella calyculata
- Cephaloziella divaricata
- Cephaloziella stellulifera
- Cephaloziella turneri
- Cerastium anomalum
- Cerastium brachypetalum subsp. roeseri
- Cerastium cerastoides
- Cerastium comatum
- Cerastium dichotomum
- Cerastium dubium
- Cerastium fragillimum
- Cerastium glomeratum
- Cerastium inflatum
- Cerastium kotschyi
- Cerastium semidecandrum
- Ceratocapnos turbinata
- Ceratocephala falcata
- Ceratocephala falcata subsp. falcata
- Ceratocephala falcata subsp. incurva
- Ceratonia siliqua
- Ceratophyllum demersum
- Cercis siliquastrum
- Cerinthe major
- Cerinthe minor subsp. auriculata
- Cerinthe minor subsp. minor
- Cerinthe palaestina
- Chaenorhinum calycinum
- Chaenorhinum minus
- Chaerophyllum aurantiacum
- Chaerophyllum libanoticum
- Chaerophyllum macrospermum
- Chaerophyllum syriacum
- Chamaeleon comosus
- Chardinia orientalis
- Chardinia xeranthimoides
- Cheilanthes fragrans
- Cheilanthes maderensis
- Chenopodium botrys
- Chenopodium foliosum
- Chenopodium opulifolium
- Chenopodium rubrum
- Cherleria labillardieri
- Chiliadenus iphionoides
- Chloris gayana
- Chloris virgata
- Chondrilla juncea
- Chrozophora tinctoria
- Chrysopogon gryllus
- Cicendia filiformis
- Cicer incisum
- Cicer incisum var. libanoticum
- Cicerbita mulgedioides
- Cichorium endivia
- Cichorium intybus
- Cichorium pumilum
- Cirsium creticum
- Cirsium creticum subsp. gaillardotii
- Cirsium diacantha
- Cirsium leucocephalum subsp. hermonis
- Cirsium libanoticum
- Cirsium phyllocephalum
- Cirsium vulgare
- Cistus creticus subsp. creticus
- Cistus salviifolius
- Cistus tauricus
- Citrullus colocynthis
- Cladanthus mixtus
- Cladium mariscus subsp. mariscus
- Clematis cirrhosa
- Clematis flammula
- Clematis vitalba
- Cleome iberica
- Clevea hyalina
- Clevea spathysii
- Clinopodium betulifolium
- Clinopodium graveolens subsp. raveolens
- Clinopodium insulare
- Clinopodium libanoticum
- Clinopodium menthifolium subsp. menthifolium
- Clinopodium nummulariifolium
- Clinopodium serpyllifolium
- Clinopodium serpyllifolium subsp. barbatum
- Clinopodium serpyllifolium subsp. brachycalyx
- Clinopodium vulgare
- Clinopodium vulgare subsp. orientale
- Clypeola jonthlaspi
- Colchicum antilibanoticum
- Colchicum cilicicum
- Colchicum crocifolium
- Colchicum decaisnei
- Colchicum dolichantherum
- Colchicum fasciculare
- Colchicum hierosolymitanum
- Colchicum persicum
- Colchicum polyphyllum
- Colchicum ritchii
- Colchicum schimperi
- Colchicum soboliferum
- Colchicum stevenii
- Colchicum szovitsii
- Colchicum szovitsii subsp. brachyphyllum (syn. Colchicum libanoticum)
- Colchicum tunicatum
- Coleostephus myconis
- Colutea cilicica
- Coluteocarpus vesicarius
- Conium maculatum
- Conocephalum conicum
- Consolida ajacis
- Consolida coelesyriaca
- Consolida flava
- Consolida hohenackeri
- Consolida incana
- Consolida orientalis
- Consolida pusilla
- Consolida rigida
- Consolida scleroclada
- Convolvulus arvensis
- Convolvulus betonicifolius
- Convolvulus cantabrica
- Convolvulus coelesyriacus
- Convolvulus dorycnium
- Convolvulus elegantissimus
- Convolvulus fatmensis
- Convolvulus galaticus
- Convolvulus libanoticus
- Convolvulus lineatus
- Convolvulus palaestinus
- Convolvulus pentapetaloides
- Convolvulus scammonia
- Convolvulus secundus
- Convolvulus siculus
- Convolvulus stachydifolius
- Convolvulus tricolor
- Corchorus olitorius
- Coriandrum sativum
- Coriandrum tordylium
- Cornucopiae alopecuroides
- Cornucopiae cucullatum
- Cornus mas
- Cornus sanguinea
- Cornus sanguinea subsp. cilicica
- Coronilla emeroides
- Corrigiola litoralis
- Corrigiola palaestina
- Corsinia coriandrina
- Corydalis erdelii
- Corydalis solida
- Corydalis solida var. brachyloba
- Corydalis triternata
- Corynephorus deschampsioides
- Corynephorus divaricatus
- Cosentinia vellea subsp. vellea
- Cota altissima
- Cota amblyolepis
- Cota coelopoda
- Cota lyonnetioides
- Cota palaestina
- Cota samuelssonii
- Cota tinctoria
- Cota wiedemanniana
- Cotoneaster nummularius
- Cotyledon libanotica
- Cousinia aleppica
- Cousinia libanotica
- Cousinia pestalozzae
- Cousinia postiana
- Cousinia ramosissima
- Crassula alata
- Crataegus azarolus
- Crataegus monogyna
- Crataegus sinaica
- Crepis aculeata
- Crepis aspera
- Crepis foetida subsp. foetida
- Crepis foetida subsp. glandulosa
- Crepis foetida subsp. rhoeadifoliaa
- Crepis hierosolymitana
- Crepis libanotica
- Crepis palaestina
- Crepis pterothecoides
- Crepis pulchra
- Crepis reuteriana
- Crepis reuteriana subsp. eigiana
- Crepis robertioides
- Crepis sancta subsp. nemausensis
- Crepis sancta subsp. obovata
- Crepis sancta subsp. sancta
- Crepis syriaca
- Crepis zacintha
- Crithmum maritimum
- Crithopsis delileana
- Crocodylium crocodylium
- Crocus aleppicus
- Crocus cancellatus subsp. cancellatus
- Crocus damascenus
- Crocus graveolens
- Crocus hermoneus subsp. hermoneus
- Crocus hyemalis
- Crocus kotschyanus subsp. kotschyanus
- Crocus ochroleucus
- Crocus pallasii subsp. dispathaceus
- Crocus pallasii subsp. haussknechtii
- Crocus pallasii subsp. pallasii
- Crocus pallasii subsp. turcinus
- Crocus vitellinus
- Crucianella aegyptiaca
- Crucianella chlorostachys
- Crucianella ciliata
- Crucianella imbricata
- Crucianella latifolia
- Crucianella macrostachya
- Crucianella membranacea
- Crucianella parviflora
- Cruciata articulata
- Cruciata pedemontana var. pedemontana
- Cruciata taurica subsp. mesopotamica
- Cruciata taurica subsp. taurica
- Crupina crupinastrum
- Crypsis aculeata
- Crypsis acuminata subsp. acuminata
- Crypsis acuminata subsp. borszczowii
- Crypsis alopecuroides
- Crypsis factorovskyi
- Crypsis schoenoides
- Crypsis vaginiflora
- Cupressus sempervirens
- Cuscuta approximata
- Cuscuta brevistyla
- Cuscuta epithymum
- Cuscuta europaea
- Cuscuta kotschyana
- Cuscuta monogyna
- Cuscuta planiflora
- Cuscuta palaestina subsp. balansae
- Cuscuta palaestina subsp. palaestina
- Cutandia dichotoma
- Cutandia maritima
- Cutandia memphitica
- Cyclamen coum
- Cyclamen libanoticum
- Cyclotrichium origanifolium
- Cyclamen persicum
- Cymbopogon jwarancusa
- Cymbopogon jwarancusa subsp. olivieri
- Cynanchum acutum
- Cynara auranitica
- Cynara scolymus
- Cynara syriaca
- Cynodon dactylon
- Cynoglossum circinnatum
- Cynoglossum creticum
- Cynoglossum lamprocarpum
- Cynoglossum lithospermifolium
- Cynoglossum montanum
- Cynoglossum nebrodense
- Cynoglossum rugulosum
- Cynoglossum schlumbergeri
- Cynoglossum stamineum
- Cynomorium coccineum
- Cynosurus coloratus
- Cynosurus echinatus
- Cynosurus elegans
- Cyperus alopecuroides
- Cyperus articulatus
- Cyperus capitatus
- Cyperus dives
- Cyperus fuscus
- Cyperus glaber
- Cyperus laevigatus subsp. distachyos
- Cyperus laevigatus subsp. laevigatus
- Cyperus longus subsp. badius
- Cyperus longus subsp. longus
- Cyperus michelianus
- Cyperus michelianus subsp. pygmaeus
- Cyperus rotundus
- Cystopteris fragilis
- Cytinus hypocistis
- Cytisopsis doryeniifolia

== D ==
- Dactylis glomerata subsp. glomerata
- Dactylis glomerata subsp. hispanica
- Dactyloctenium aegyptium
- Dactylorhiza balabaniana
- Dactylorhiza iberica
- Dactylorhiza osmanica var. osmanica
- Dactylorhiza romana subsp. romana
- Dactylorhiza saccifera subsp. gervasiana
- Dactylorhiza saccifera subsp. saccifera
- Damasonium bourgaei
- Danae racemosa
- Daphne oleoides
- Daphne pontica subsp. pontica
- Daphne sericea
- Datura stramonium (introduced)
- Daucus aureus
- Daucus broteri
- Daucus carota
- Daucus guttatus
- Daucus littoralis
- Daucus pumilus
- Daucus setulosus
- Delphinium fissum subsp. ithaburense
- Delphinium hohenackeri
- Delphinium peregrinum
- Delphinium staphisagria
- Delphinium virgatum
- Desmazeria philistaea
- Desmostachya bipinnata
- Dianthus cyri
- Dianthus karami
- Dianthus libanotis
- Dianthus micranthus
- Dianthus monadelphus subsp. judaicus
- Dianthus monadelphus subsp. monadelphus
- Dianthus orientalis
- Dianthus pendulus
- Dianthus strictus
- Dianthus strictus subsp. multipunctatus
- Dianthus strictus var. strictus
- Dianthus strictus subsp. sublaevis
- Dianthus strictus subsp. velutinus
- Dianthus tripunctatus
- Dichanthium annulatum var. annulatum
- Dichoropetalum aureum
- Dichoropetalum depauperatum
- Dichoropetalum junceum
- Digitalis ferruginea
- Digitaria sanguinalis
- Dinebra retroflexa var. retroflexa
- Dioscorea communis (syn. Tamus communis)
- Dioscorea orientalis
- Diplachne fusca subsp. fusca
- Diplophyllum taxifolium
- Dipsacus laciniatus
- Dipsacus fullonum
- Dittrichia graveolens
- Dittrichia viscosa subsp. angustifolia
- Doronicum orientale
- Draba nuda
- Draba oxycarpa
- Drabopsis verna
- Drimia aphylla
- Drimia fugax
- Drimia maritima
- Drimia undata
- Drosera rotundifolia
- Dryopteris pallida subsp. libanotica
- Dryopteris pallida subsp. pallida
- Dysphania botrys

== E ==
- Ecballium elaterium
- Echinaria capitata
- Echinochloa colona
- Echinochloa crus-galli
- Echinodorus ranunculoides
- Echinops adenocaulos
- Echinops gaillardotii
- Echinops polyceras
- Echinops spinosissimus subsp. macrolepis
- Echinops spinosissimus subsp. spinosissimus
- Echinops viscosus
- Echium angustifolium
- Echium glomeratum
- Echium judaeum
- Echium plantagineum
- Elaeagnus angustifolia زيزفون سوري
- Elaeosticta meifolia
- Eleocharis geniculata
- Eleocharis macrantha
- Eleocharis palustris subsp. palustris
- Eleusine indica
- Elymus libanoticus
- Elymus panormitanus
- Elymus repens subsp. repens
- Elymus tauri var. tauri
- Emex spinosa
- Eminium intortum
- Eminium rauwolffii var. kotschyi
- Eminium rauwolffii var. rauwolffii
- Eminium spiculatum
- Enarthrocarpus arcuatus
- Ephedra alata subsp. alata
- Ephedra aphylla
- Ephedra foeminea
- Ephedra major subsp. major
- Ephedra transitoria
- Epilobium angustifolium
- Epilobium hirsutum
- Epilobium lanceolatum
- Epilobium minutiflorum
- Epilobium montanum
- Epilobium parviflorum
- Epilobium tetragonum subsp. tetragonum
- Epilobium tetragonum subsp. tournefortii
- Epipactis condensata
- Epipactis helleborine subsp. helleborine
- Epipactis veratrifolia
- Equisetum palustre
- Equisetum ramosissimum
- Equisetum telmateia
- Eragrostis barrelieri
- Eragrostis cilianensis
- Eragrostis collina
- Eragrostis japonica
- Eragrostis minor
- Eragrostis pilosa
- Eremogone minuartioides
- Eremogone picta
- Eremopoa capillaris
- Eremopoa persica
- Eremopyrum bonaepartis
- Eremopyrum distans
- Eremopyrum orientale
- Eremostachys laciniata
- Eremurus cappadocicus
- Eremurus spectabilis
- Eremurus wallii
- Erica manipuliflora
- Erica sicula subsp. libanotica
- Erigeron libanoticus
- Erodium acaule (geraniacae)
- Erodium botrys
- Erodium cicutarium
- Erodium gaillardotii
- Erodium glaucophyllum
- Erodium gruinum
- Erodium laciniatum
- Erodium malacoides
- Erodium moschatum
- Erodium neuradifolium
- Erodium romanum
- Erodium trichomanifolium
- Erophaca baetica subsp. baetica
- Erophaca baetica subsp. orientalis
- Erophila gilgiana
- Erophila setulosa
- Ervum ervoides
- Ervum lenticula
- Eryngium billardieri
- Eryngium bourgatii subsp. heldreichii
- Eryngium campestre
- Eryngium creticum
- Eryngium desertorum
- Eryngium falcatum
- Eryngium glomeratum
- Eryngium maritimum
- Eryngium pusillum
- Erysimum goniocaulon
- Erysimum libanoticum
- Erysimum oleifolium
- Erysimum repandum
- Erysimum scabrum
- Erysimum verrucosum
- Eudianthe coeli-rosa
- Eudianthe laeta
- Eunomia oppositifolia
- Eupatorium cannabinum
- Euphorbia aleppica
- Euphorbia altissima var. altissima
- Euphorbia altissima var. glabrescens
- Euphorbia antilibanotica
- Euphorbia apios
- Euphorbia arguta
- Euphorbia aulacosperma
- Euphorbia berythea
- Euphorbia cassia subsp. cassia
- Euphorbia caudiculosa
- Euphorbia chaborasia
- Euphorbia chamaepeplus
- Euphorbia chamaesyce
- Euphorbia cheiradenia
- Euphorbia cuspidata
- Euphorbia dendroides
- Euphorbia densa subsp. densa
- Euphorbia denticulata
- Euphorbia erinacea
- Euphorbia eriophora
- Euphorbia erubescens
- Euphorbia esula subsp. esula
- Euphorbia exigua subsp. exigua
- Euphorbia falcata subsp.falcata
- Euphorbia falcata var. galilaea
- Euphorbia fistulosa
- Euphorbia forskaolii
- Euphorbia gaillardotii
- Euphorbia granulata
- Euphorbia grossheimii
- Euphorbia haussknechtii
- Euphorbia helioscopia subsp. helioscopia
- Euphorbia herniariifolia var. herniariifolia
- Euphorbia hierosolymitana var. hierosolymitana
- Euphorbia hirsuta
- Euphorbia kotschyana
- Euphorbia macroclada
- Euphorbia microsphaera
- Euphorbia nutans
- Euphorbia obovata
- Euphorbia oxyodonta
- Euphorbia paralias
- Euphorbia peplis
- Euphorbia peplus var. minima
- Euphorbia peplus var. peplus
- Euphorbia petiolata var. petiolata
- Euphorbia petiolata var. postii
- Euphorbia petrophila
- Euphorbia phymatosperma subsp. phymatosperma
- Euphorbia physocaulos
- Euphorbia promecocarpa
- Euphorbia reuteriana
- Euphorbia rigida
- Euphorbia sintenisii
- Euphorbia szovitsii var. szovitsii
- Euphorbia terracina
- Euphorbia valerianifolia
- Exoacantha heterophylla

== F ==
- Fagonia olivieri
- Faidherbia albida
- Falcaria vulgaris
- Fallopia convolvulus
- Ferula cassii
- Ferula biverticillata
- Ferula communis
- Ferula elaeochytris
- Ferula hermonis
- Ferula tingitana
- Ferulago frigida
- Ferulago syriaca
- Ferulago trachycarpa
- Festuca arundinacea
- Festuca callieri
- Festuca circummediterranea
- Festuca jeanpertii
- Festuca ovina
- Festuca pinifolia
- Festuca pratensis
- Fibigia clypeata subsp. eriocarpa
- Fibigia eriocarpa old name See Fibigia clyptea
- Ficaria ficarioides
- Ficaria grandiflora
- Ficaria verna subsp. ficariiformis
- Ficaria verna subsp. verna
- Ficus carica
- Filago anatolica
- Filago arvensis
- Filago contracta
- Filago davisii
- Filago eriocephala
- Filago eriosphaera
- Filago gallica
- Filago griffithii
- Filago palaestina
- Filago pygmaea
- Filago pyramidata
- Filago vulgaris
- Fimbristylis autumnalis
- Fimbristylis bisumbellata
- Fimbristylis ferruginea subsp. ferruginea
- Fimbristylis ferruginea subsp. sieberiana
- Fimbristylis turkestanica
- Foeniculum vulgare (fennel)
- Fontanesia phillyreoides
- Fossombronia angulosa
- Fossombronia caespitiformis
- Fossombronia pusilla
- Fragaria vesca (wild strawberry)
- Frangula alnus subsp. pontica
- Frankenia hispida
- Frankenia pulverulenta
- Fraxinus angustifolia
- Fraxinus angustifolia subsp. syriaca
- Fraxinus ornus subsp. ornus
- Fritillaria acmopetala subsp. acmopetala
- Fritillaria alfredae subsp. alfredae
- Fritillaria alfredae subsp. platyptera
- Fritillaria crassifolia subsp. crassifolia
- Fritillaria elwesii
- Fritillaria frankiorum
- Fritillaria hermonis
- Fritillaria latakiensis
- Fritillaria persica (syn. Fritillaria libanotica )
- Fritillaria pinardii subsp. pinardii
- Frullania dilatata
- Frullania tamarisci
- Fumana arabica
- Fumana procumbens
- Fumana scoparia
- Fumana thymifolia
- Fumaria asepala
- Fumaria bastardii
- Fumaria capreolata
- Fumaria cilicica
- Fumaria densiflora
- Fumaria gaillardotii
- Fumaria judaica
- Fumaria kralikii
- Fumaria macrocarpa
- Fumaria officinalis
- Fumaria parviflora
- Fuirena pubescens var. pubescens

== G ==
- Gagea bohemica
- Gagea chlorantha
- Gagea circumplexa
- Gagea dayana
- Gagea foliosa
- Gagea gageoides
- Gagea granatellii
- Gagea kneissea
- Gagea libanotica
- Gagea liotardii
- Gagea luteoides
- Gagea micrantha
- Gagea peduncularis
- Gagea reticulata
- Gagea rigida
- Gagea villosa var. hermonis
- Gagea villosa var. villosa
- Galanthus fosteri
- Galium adhaerens
- Galium album
- Galium album subsp. amani
- Galium album subsp. prusense
- Galium aparine
- Galium bracteatum
- Galium canum subsp. canum
- Galium cassium
- Galium chaetopodum
- Galium consanguineum
- Galium divaricatum
- Galium ehrenbergii
- Galium elongatum
- Galium ghilanicum
- Galium hierochuntinum
- Galium hierosolymitanum
- Galium humifusum
- Galium incanum subsp. elatius
- Galium incanum subsp. incanum
- Galium incanum subsp. libanoticum
- Galium judaicum
- Galium jungermannioides
- Galium libanoticum
- Galium murale
- Galium nigricans
- Galium penicillatum
- Galium peplidifolium
- Galium pestalozzae
- Galium pisiferum
- Galium rivale
- Galium rotundifolium
- Galium samuelssonii var. pseudadhaerens
- Galium samuelssonii var. samuelssonii
- Galium schlumbergeri
- Galium setaceum
- Galium shepardii
- Galium tenuissimum
- Galium tenuissimum f. tenuissimum
- Galium tenuissimum f. trichophorum
- Galium thiebautii
- Galium tricornutum
- Galium verrucosum
- Galium verticillatum
- Galium verum subsp. glabrescens
- Galium verum subsp. verum
- Garhadiolus hedypnois
- Garidella unguicularis
- Gastridium phleoides
- Gastridium ventricosum
- Gaudinia fragilis
- Genista libanotica
- Genista monspessulana
- Geranium libani
- Geranium libanoticum
- Geranium molle
- Geranium purpureum
- Geranium rotundifolium
- Geranium tuberosum
- Geropogon hybridus
- Geum heterocarpum
- Geum urbanum
- Gladiolus antakiensis
- Gladiolus atroviolaceus (syn. G. aleppicus)
- Gladiolus imbricatus
- Gladiolus italicus
- Glaucium corniculatum
- Glaucium flavum
- Glaucium grandiflorum
- Glaucium leiocarpum
- Glaucium oxylobum
- Glebionis coronaria (edible)
- Glebionis segetum
- Glinus lotoides
- Glochidotheca foeniculacea
- Glyceria notata
- Gnaphalium uliginosum
- Gomphocarpus fruticosus (introduced?)
- Gongylanthus ericetorum
- Groenlandia densa
- Gundelia tournefortii
- Gymnarrhena micrantha
- Gymnogramma leptophylla
- Gynandriris sisyrinchium
- Gypsophila antari
- Gypsophila arabica
- Gypsophila damascena
- Gypsophila libanotica
- Gypsophila mollis
- Gypsophila perfoliata
- Gypsophila pilosa
- Gypsophila ruscifolia
- Gypsophila viscosa

== H ==
- Hainardia cylindrica
- Habrosia spinuliflora
- Halimione portulacoides
- Halimium umbellatum
- Haplophyllum armenum
- Haplophyllum buxbaumii
- Haplophyllum fruticulosum
- Hedera caucasigena
- Hedypnois rhagadioloides
- Hedypnois rhagadioloides subsp. rhagadioloides
- Hedypnois rhagadioloides subsp. tubaeformis
- Heleocharis macrantha
- Heleocharis palustris
- Heleochloa schoenoides
- Helianthemum aegyptiacum
- Helianthemum kotschyanum
- Helianthemum lasiocarpum
- Helianthemum ledifolium subsp. campylopus
- Helianthemum ledifolium
- Helianthemum lippii
- Helianthemum nummularium subsp. tomentosum
- Helianthemum nummularium
- Helianthemum ovatum
- Helianthemum salicifolium
- Helianthemum stipulatum
- Helianthemum syriacum
- Helianthemum vulgare
- Helichrysum armenium
- Helichrysum luteoalbum
- Helichrysum pallasii
- Helichrysum plicatum
- Helichrysum pygmaeum
- Helichrysum sanguineum
- Helichrysum stoechas subsp. barrelieri
- Helichrysum virgineum
- Helichrysum virgineum
- Helictotrichon convolutum
- Helictotrichon pratense subsp. pratense
- Heliotropium bovei
- Heliotropium hirsutissimum
- Heliotropium lasiocarpum
- Heliotropium myosotoides
- Heliotropium rotundifolium
- Heliotropium schweinfurthii
- Heliotropium supinum
- Helminthotheca echioides
- Helosciadium nodiflorum
- Hemarthria altissima
- Hemionitis pteridioides
- Henrardia persica
- Henrardia pubescens
- Heptaptera anisoptera
- Heracleum humile
- Herniaria cinerea
- Herniaria glabra
- Herniaria hirsuta
- Herniaria incana
- Hesperis kotschyana
- Hesperis pendula
- Heteranthelium piliferum
- Heteropogon contortus
- Hibiscus trionum
- Hieracium bauhinii
- Hieracium kneissaeum
- Hieracium schmidtii subsp. labillardierei
- Hieracium schmidtii subsp. libanoticum
- Himantoglossum caprinum
- Himantoglossum comperianum
- Himantogolossum affine
- Hippocrepis multisiliquosa
- Hippocrepis unisiliquosa
- Hirtellina lobelii
- Holcus annuus subsp. annuus
- Holcus lanatus
- Holosteum glutinosum
- Holosteum umbellatum
- Hordeum bulbosum
- Hordeum distichon
- Hordeum marinum subsp. gussoneanum
- Hordeum marinum subsp. marinum
- Hordeum murinum subsp. glaucum
- Hordeum murinum subsp. leporinum
- Hordeum murinum subsp. murinum
- Hordeum secalinum
- Hordeum spontaneum
- Hordeum vulgare
- Hormuzakia aggregata
- Hyacinthella nervosa
- Hyacinthus orientalis subsp. orientalis
- Hymenocarpus circinatus
- Hyoscyamus albus
- Hyoscyamus aureus
- Hyoscyamus niger
- Hyoscyamus pojarkovae
- Hyoscyamus reticulates
- Hyoseris scabra
- Hyparrhenia hirta
- Hypecoum imberbe
- Hypecoum imberbe
- Hypericum amblysepalum
- Hypericum confertum
- Hypericum hircinum subsp. majus
- Hypericum lanuginosum
- Hypericum lanuginosum
- Hypericum libanoticum
- Hypericum lydium
- Hypericum montbretii
- Hypericum nanum
- Hypericum pallens
- Hypericum pallens
- Hypericum perforatum
- Hypericum perforatum
- Hypericum russeggeri
- Hypericum scabrum
- Hypericum tetrapterum
- Hypericum thymifolium
- Hypericum thymifolium
- Hypericum triquetrifolium
- Hypericum venustum
- Hypochaeris achyrophorus
- Hypochaeris glabra

== I ==
- Ifloga spicatasubsp. spicata
- Ifloga spicatasubsp. labillardierei
- Imperata cylindrica
- Inula conyzae
- Inula salicina
- Inula verbascifolia subsp. heterolepis
- Ipomoea cairica
- Ipomoea imperati
- Iris albicans
- Iris antilibanotica
- Iris assadiana
- Iris atrofusca
- Iris aucheri
- Iris auranitica
- Iris basaltica
- Iris bismarckiana
- Iris bostrensis
- Iris caucasica subsp. caucasica
- Iris cedreti
- Iris damascena
- Iris gatesii
- Iris germanica
- Iris grant-duffii
- Iris hermona
- Iris histrio
- Iris kirkwoodiae subsp. kirkwoodiae
- Iris lortetii var. lortetii
- Iris masia
- Iris nusairiensis
- Iris palaestina
- Iris pallida subsp. pallida
- Iris persica
- Iris postii
- Iris pseudacorus (LF)
- Iris susiana (syn. Iris sofarana)
- Iris swensoniana
- Iris unguicularis
- Iris unguicularis var. syriaca
- Iris vartanii
- Iris westii
- Iris yebrudii subsp. edgecombii
- Iris yebrudii subsp. yebrudii
- Isatis lusitanica
- Isoetes histrix
- Isoetes libanotica
- Isolepis cernua var. cernua
- Isolepis setacea
- Ixiolirion tataricum var. tataricum

== J ==
- Jacobaea aquatica
- Jacobaea erratica
- Jacobaea mouterdei (endemic)
- Jasminum fruticans
- Johrenia dichotoma
- Johrenia tortuosa
- Juncus capitatus
- Juncus effusus
- Juncus littoralis
- Juncus rechingeri
- Juncus rigidus
- Juncus sphaerocarpus
- Juncus subnodulosus
- Juncus subulatus
- Jungermannia atrovirens
- Juniperus communis var. communis
- Juniperus communis var. saxatilis
- Juniperus drupacea
- Juniperus excelsa
- Juniperus foetidissima
- Juniperus oxycedrus
- Juniperus phoenicea
- Jurinea staehelinae

== K ==
- Kickxia aegyptiaca subsp. palaestina
- Kickxia commutata subsp. commutata
- Kickxia commutata subsp. graeca
- Kickxia elatine subsp. crinita
- Kickxia lanigera
- Kickxia spuria subsp. integrifolia
- Kickxia spuria subsp. spuria
- Kitaibelia balansae
- Klasea cerinthifolia
- Klasea mouterdei
- Klasea pusilla (syn. Serratula pusilla)
- Koeleria nitidula
- Koelpinia linearis
- Krubera peregrina

== L ==
- Lactuca microcephala
- Lactuca orientalis
- Lactuca saligna
- Lactuca sativa
- Lactuca serriola
- Lactuca triquetra
- Lactuca tuberosa
- Lactuca viminea
- Lagoecia cuminoides
- Lagonychium farctum
- Lagurus ovatus
- Lallemantia iberica
- Lallemantia royleana
- Lamarckia aurea
- Lamium amplexicaule subsp. amplexicaule
- Lamium amplexicaule var. allepicum
- Lamium amplexicaule var. bornmuelleri
- Lamium amplexicaule var. incisum
- Lamium eriocephalum
- Lamium garganicum subsp. garganicum
- Lamium garganicum subsp. striatum
- Lamium garganicum var. microphyllum
- Lamium macrodon
- Lamium maculatum
- Lamium moschatum
- Lamium moschatum subsp. micranthuma
- Lamium orientale
- Lamium purpureum var. ehrenbergii
- Lamium purpureum var. incisum
- Lamium purpureum var. purpureum
- Lappula barbata
- Lappula sessiliflora
- Lappula sinaica
- Lappula spinocarpos
- Lappula szovitsiana
- Lapsana communis subsp. communis
- Lapsana communis subsp. pisidica
- Lapsana communis subsp. ramosissima
- Laser trilobum
- Lathyrus aphaca
- Lathyrus digitatus
- Lathyrus hierosolymitanus
- Lathyrus libani
- Lathyrus nissolia
- Lathyrus setifolius
- Lathyrus variabilis
- Launaea fragilis
- Laurus nobilis
- Lavandula stoechas subsp. stoechas
- Leersia hexandra
- Lavatera punctata
- Lavatera trimestris
- Lecokia cretica
- Legousia falcata
- Legousia hybrida
- Legousia pentagonia
- Legousia speculum-veneris
- Leiotulus secacul
- Lemna gibba
- Lemna minor
- Leontice leontopetalum subsp. armeniaca
- Leontice leontopetalum subsp. leontopetalum
- Leontodon asperrimus
- Leontodon libanoticus
- Leontodon oxylepis
- Leontodon tuberosus
- Leopoldia bicolor
- Leopoldia comosa
- Leopoldia longipes subsp. longipes
- Leopoldia maritima
- Leopoldia tenuiflora
- Lepidium chalepense
- Lepidium latifolium
- Lilium candidum
- Limbarda crithmoides subsp.longifolia
- Limodorum abortivum var. abortivum
- Limonium angustifolium
- Limonium cedrorum
- Limonium graecum
- Limonium mouterdei
- Limonium narbonense
- Limonium postii
- Limonium sieberi
- Limonium sinuatum
- Limonium virgatum
- Linaria antilibanotica
- Linaria chalepensis
- Linaria damascena
- Linaria joppensis
- Linaria kurdica subsp. aucheri
- Linaria micrantha
- Linaria pelisseriana
- Linaria simplex
- Linum aroanium
- Linum bienne
- Linum carnosulum
- Linum corymbulosum
- Linum gallicum
- Linum mucronatum subsp. armenum
- Linum mucronatum subsp. orientale
- Linum mucronatum subsp. syriacum
- Linum mucronatumsubsp. mucronatum
- Linum nodiflorum
- Linum peyronii
- Linum pubescens
- Linum strictum
- Linum toxicum
- Linum trigynum
- Linum usitatissimum
- Liochlaena lanceolata
- Lisaea strigosa
- Lithospermum officinale
- Lloydia rubroviridis
- Loliolum subulatum
- Lolium multiflorum
- Lolium perenne
- Lolium persicum
- Lolium rigidum
- Lolium temulentum
- Lomelosia argentea
- Lomelosia aucheri
- Lomelosia brachiata
- Lomelosia calocephala
- Lomelosia divaricata
- Lomelosia olivieri
- Lomelosia palestina
- Lomelosia prolifera
- Lonicera arborea
- Lonicera caucasica subsp. orientalis
- Lonicera etrusca
- Lonicera etrusca
- Lonicera nummulariifolia
- Lophocolea bidentata
- Lophocolea heterophylla
- Lotus angustissimus
- Lotus corniculatus var. alpinus
- Lotus cytisoides
- Lotus gebelia
- Lotus gebelia subsp. libanoticus
- Lotus tenuis
- Ludwigia adscendens subsp. diffusa
- Ludwigia palustris
- Lunularia cruciata
- Lupinus digitatus
- Lupinus hirsutus
- Lycium barbarum
- Lycium chinense
- Lycium europaeum
- Lycochloa avenacea
- Lycopus europaeus
- Lysimachia arvensis
- Lysimachia dubia
- Lysimachia foemina
- Lysimachia linum-stellatum
- Lythrum hyssopifolia
- Lythrum junceum
- Lythrum salicaria
- Lythrum tribracteatum
- Lythrum volgense

== M ==
- Malcolmia maritima
- Malus trilobata
- Malva aegyptia
- Malva hirsuta
- Malva multiflora
- Malva neglecta
- Malva nicaeensis
- Malva oxyloba
- Malva parviflora
- Malva punctata
- Malva sylvestris
- Malva trimestris
- Malvella sherardiana
- Mandragora autumnalis
- Mannia androgyna
- Mannia californica
- Marchantia paleacea
- Marchantia polymorpha
- Marchantia quadrata
- Marrubium cuneatum
- Marrubium globosum
- Marrubium globosum subsp. libanoticum
- Marrubium hierapolitanum
- Marrubium vulgare
- Matthiola crassifolia
- Matthiola crassifolia var flaviflora
- Matthiola tricuspidata
- Matricaria aurea
- Matricaria chamomilla
- Medicago lupulina
- Medicago minima
- Medicago orbicularis
- Medicago polymorpha
- Medicago sativa
- Megathyrsus maximus Syn. Panicum maximum
- Melanortocarya obtusifolia
- Melica capillaris
- Melica ciliata
- Melica eligulata
- Melica haussknechtii
- Melica persica
- Melica uniflora
- Melilotus indicus
- Melilotus officinalis
- Melissa officinalis
- Melissa officinalis subsp. inodora
- Mentha aquatica
- Mentha longifolia subsp. longifolia
- Mentha longifolia subsp. typhoides
- Mentha piperita
- Mentha pulegium
- Mentha spicata subsp. condensata
- Mentha spicata subsp. spicata
- Mercurialis annua
- Mercurialis ovata
- Mericarpaea ciliata
- Mesembryanthemum nodiflorum
- Mesoptychia turbinata
- Metzgeria furcata
- Michauxia campanuloides
- Michauxia nuda
- Micromeria cremnophila
- Micromeria cremnophila subsp. amana
- Micromeria graeca subsp. graeca
- Micromeria graeca subsp. laxiflora
- Micromeria juliana
- Micromeria myrtifolia
- Micromeria nervosa
- Micropus supinus
- Milium pedicellare
- Milium vernale
- Minuartia decipiens subsp. damascena
- Minuartia decipiens subsp. decipiens
- Minuartia globulosa
- Minuartia hamata
- Minuartia innominata
- Minuartia intermedia
- Minuartia libanotica
- Minuartia meyeri
- Minuartia parvulorum
- Misopates orontium
- Molinia caerulea
- Moluccella laevis
- Moluccella spinosa
- Moenchia erecta subsp. octandra
- Montia minor
- Moorochloa eruciformis
- Moraea sisyrinchium
- Morina persica
- Muscari commutatum
- Muscari hermonense
- Muscari neglectum
- Muscari parviflorum
- Myopordon pulchellum
- Myosotis laxa subsp. caespitosa
- Myosotis lithospermifolia
- Myosotis ramosissima subsp. ramosissima
- Myosotis ramosissima subsp. uncata
- Myosotis refracta
- Myosotis sicula
- Myosotis stricta
- Myosurus minimus
- Myriocoleopsis minutissima
- Myriophyllum spicatum
- Myriophyllum verticillatum
- Myrtus communis

== N ==
- Najas graminea var. graminea
- Najas marina
- Najas marina var. intermedia
- Najas minor
- Narcissus serotinus
- Narcissus tazetta subsp. tazetta
- Nardia compressa
- Nasturtium officinale
- Neotinea maculata
- Neotinea tridentata
- Nepeta campylantha
- Nepeta cataria
- Nepeta cilicica
- Nepeta congesta
- Nepeta curviflora
- Nepeta flavida
- Nepeta glomerata
- Nepeta italica subsp. italica
- Nepeta italica subsp. rigidula
- Nepeta nuda
- Nepeta nuda subsp. albiflora
- Nepeta pabotii
- Nepeta stricta
- Nepeta trachonitica
- Nerium oleander
- Neurada procumbens
- Nigella arvensis subsp. arvensis
- Nigella arvensis subsp. palaestina
- Nigella ciliaris
- Nigella deserti
- Nigella oxypetala subsp. latisecta
- Nigella oxypetala subsp. oxypetala
- Nonea echioides
- Nonea melanocarpa
- Noaea mucronata
- Noccaea microstyla
- Nonea obtusifolia
- Notobasis syriaca
- Nuphar luteum

== O ==
- Odontarrhena libanotica (syn. Alyssum libanoticum)
- Odontites aucheri
- Odontites hispidulus
- Odontites luteus
- Oenanthe aquatica
- Oenanthe fistulosa
- Oenanthe pimpinelloides
- Oenanthe silaifolia
- Oldenlandia corymbosa
- Oldenlandia corymbosa var. caespitosa
- Olea europaea subsp. europaea
- Oloptum miliaceum
- Onobrychis cornuta
- Ononis adenotricha
- Ononis natrix
- Ononis pusilla
- Ononis reclinata var. mollis
- Ononis spinosa subsp. leiosperma
- Onopordum blancheanum
- Onopordum carduiforme
- Onopordum cynarocephalum
- Onopordum floccosum
- Onopordum heteracanthum
- Onopordum syriacum
- Onopordum tauricum
- Onosma caerulescens
- Onosma frutescens
- Onosma montanum
- Onosma rascheyanum
- Onosma roussaei
- Onosma sericeum
- Onosma xanthotrichum
- Ophioglossum azoricum
- Ophioglossum lusitanicum
- Ophioglossum vulgatum
- Ophrys apifera
- Ophrys argolica
- Ophrys argolica subsp. lucis
- Ophrys cilicica
- Ophrys fuciflora subsp. bornmuelleri
- Ophrys fuciflora subsp. fuciflora
- Ophrys fuciflora subsp. oblita
- Ophrys fuciflora var. ziyaretiana
- Ophrys fusca subsp. cinereophila
- Ophrys fusca subsp. fusca
- Ophrys fusca subsp. iricolor
- Ophrys lutea
- Ophrys lutea subsp. galilaea
- Ophrys omegaifera
- Ophrys omegaifera subsp. israelitica
- Ophrys reinholdii
- Ophrys reinholdii subsp. antiochiana
- Ophrys schulzei
- Ophrys scolopax
- Ophrys speculum subsp. speculum
- Ophrys sphegodes
- Ophrys sphegodes subsp. mammosa
- Ophrys umbilicata subsp. flavomarginata
- Ophrys umbilicata subsp. latakiana
- Ophrys umbilicata subsp. umbilicata
- Orchis anatolica
- Orchis anthropophora
- Orchis galilaea
- Orchis italica
- Orchis mascula subsp. mascula
- Orchis patens var. asiatica
- Orchis punctulata
- Orchis simia subsp. simia
- Orchis spitzelii subsp. spitzelii
- Origanum adonidis
- Origanum barbarae
- Origanum bargyli
- Origanum cordifolium
- Origanum ehrenbergii
- Origanum laevigatum
- Origanum libanoticum
- Origanum pabotii
- Origanum syriacum subsp. bevanii
- Origanum syriacum subsp. syriacum
- Orlaya daucoides
- Ornithogalum apiculatum
- Ornithogalum arabicum
- Ornithogalum cuspidatum
- Ornithogalum fuscescens
- Ornithogalum lanceolatum
- Ornithogalum libanoticum
- Ornithogalum montanum
- Ornithogalum narbonense
- Ornithogalum neurostegium subsp. eigii
- Ornithogalum neurostegium subsp. neurostegium
- Ornithogalum sphaerocarpum
- Ornithogalum umbellatum
- Orobanche camptolepis
- Orobanche cernua
- Orobanche crenata
- Orobanche grisebachii
- Orobanche hermonis
- Orobanche minor
- Orobanche pubescens
- Osmunda regalis
- Osmunda regalis var. plumieri
- Ostrya carpinifolia
- Osyris alba
- Oxalis pes-caprae (introduced, noxious)

== P ==
- Paeonia kesrouanensis
- Paeonia mascula subsp. mascula
- Paeonia mascula subsp. orientalis
- Paliurus spina-christi
- Pallenis spinosa subsp. asteroidea
- Pallenis spinosa subsp. spinosa
- Pancratium maritimum
- Pancratium sickenbergeri
- Panicum capillare (introduced)
- Panicum miliaceum
- Panicum repens
- Panicum turgidum
- Papaver argemone subsp. belangeri
- Papaver dubium
- Papaver hybridum
- Papaver libanoticum
- Papaver postii
- Papaver rhoeas subsp. polytrichum
- Papaver rhoeas subsp. rhoeas
- Papaver syriacum
- Papaver umbonatum
- Paragymnopteris marantae
- Parapholis incurva
- Parapholis marginata
- Parentucellia latifolia
- Parentucellia viscosa
- Parietaria alsinifolia
- Parietaria cretica
- Parietaria judaica
- Parietaria lusitanica
- Paronychia argentea
- Paronychia echinulata
- Paronychia kurdica
- Paronychia macrosepala
- Paronychia mesopotamica
- Paronychia palaestina
- Paspalidium geminatum
- Paspalum dilatatum (invasive)
- Paspalum distichum
- Pastinaca sativa (parsnip)
- Pedicularis comosa subsp. campestris
- Pellia epiphylla
- Peltaria angustifolia
- Pennisetum divisum
- Pennisetum glaucum
- Pennisetum orientale
- Periploca graeca
- Persicaria amphibia
- Persicaria hydropiper
- Persicaria lapathifolia
- Persicaria maculosa
- Persicaria salicifolia
- Petrorhagia cretica
- Petrorhagia dubia
- Petrosedum amplexicaule subsp. tenuifolium
- Peucedanum autumnale
- Phacelurus digitatus
- Phaeoceros laevis
- Phagnalon kotschyi
- Phagnalon linifolium
- Phagnalon rupestre
- Phalaris aquatica
- Phalaris arundinacea
- Phalaris brachystachys
- Phalaris coerulescens
- Phalaris minor
- Phalaris paradoxa
- Phelipanche aegyptiaca
- Phelipanche astragali
- Phelipanche lavandulacea
- Phelipanche libanotica
- Phelipanche mutelii
- Phelipanche nana
- Phelipanche ramosa
- Phelipanche schultzii
- Phillyrea latifolia
- Phleum alpinum
- Phleum arenarium
- Phleum bertolonii
- Phleum boissieri
- Phleum exaratum
- Phleum montanum
- Phleum pratense
- Phleum subulatum
- Phlomis brachyodon subsp. brachyodon
- Phlomis brachyodon subsp. damascena
- Phlomis brevilabris
- Phlomis bruguieri
- Phlomis chrysophylla
- Phlomis herba-venti
- Phlomis herba-venti subsp. pungens
- Phlomis kotschyana
- Phlomis kurdica
- Phlomis longifolia
- Phlomis rigida
- Phlomis syriaca
- Phlomis tathamiorum
- Phlomis viscosa
- Phlomoides laciniata
- Phlomoides molucelloides
- Phoenix dactylifera (introduced)
- Phragmites australis subsp. australis
- Phragmites australis subsp. isiacus
- Phymatoceros bulbiculosus
- Physospermum cornubiense
- Phytolacca pruinosa
- Picnomon acarna
- Picris amalecitana
- Picris galilaea
- Picris longirostris
- Picris rhagadioloides
- Picris strigosa
- Pilosella echioides
- Pilosella piloselloides subsp. bauhinii
- Pilosella piloselloides subsp. magyarica
- Pilosella piloselloides subsp. piloselloides
- Pilosella procera
- Pimpinella corymbosa
- Pimpinella cretica
- Pimpinella paucidentata
- Pimpinella peregrina
- Pimpinella tragium
- Pinus brutia var. brutia
- Pinus halepensis
- Pinus pinea
- Piptatherum blancheanum
- Piptatherum coerulescens
- Piptatherum holciforme subsp. holciforme
- Piptatherum holciforme var. longiglume
- Piptatherum molinioides
- Pistacia atlantica
- Pistacia eurycarpa
- Pistacia lentiscus
- Pistacia terebinthus
- Pistacia vera
- Plagiochila porelloides
- Plantago afra
- Plantago albicans
- Plantago bellardii subsp. bellardii
- Plantago bellardii subsp. deflexa
- Plantago coronopus
- Plantago crassifolia
- Plantago cretica
- Plantago holosteum
- Plantago lagopus
- Plantago lanceolata
- Plantago loeflingii
- Plantago major
- Plantago notata
- Plantago sarcophylla
- Plantago squarrosa
- Plantago uliginosa
- Plantago weldenii
- Platanthera bifolia subsp. bifolia
- Platanthera chlorantha
- Platanthera holmboei
- Platanus orientalis
- Plocama calabrica
- Pluchea dioscoridis
- Plumbago europaea
- Poa annua
- Poa bulbosa
- Poa chaixii
- Poa compressa
- Poa diversifolia
- Poa hackelii
- Poa infirma
- Poa nemoralis
- Poa pratensis
- Poa sinaica
- Poa sterilis
- Poa timoleontis
- Poa trivialis
- Podonosma orientalis
- Podospermum alpigenum
- Podospermum canum
- Polycarpon succuientum
- Polycarpon tetraphyllum
- Polygala monspeliaca
- Polygala supina
- Polygonum arenarium
- Polygonum aviculare
- Polygonum bellardii
- Polygonum cedrorum
- Polygonum cognatum
- Polygonum equisetiforme
- Polygonum libani
- Polygonum maritimum
- Polygonum polycnemoides
- Polygonum setosum
- Polypodium cambricum
- Polypodium vulgare subsp. Serratum
- Polypogon maritimus
- Polypogon monspeliensis
- Polypogon viridis
- Polystichum aculeatum
- Pontechium maculatum
- Populus tremula
- Porella arboris-vitae
- Porella cordaeana
- Porella obtusata
- Porella platyphylla
- Portulaca edulis
- Portulaca oleracea
- Potamogeton berchtoldii subsp. berchtoldii
- Potamogeton crispus
- Potamogeton lucens
- Potamogeton natans
- Potamogeton nodosus
- Potamogeton perfoliatus
- Potamogeton trichoides
- Potentilla geranioides **
- Potentilla hirta subsp. laeta
- Potentilla kotschyana
- Potentilla libanotica
- Potentilla micrantha
- Potentilla reptans
- Potentilla speciosa
- Potentilla supina
- Poterium gaillardotii
- Poterium sanguisorba
- Poterium verrucosum
- Prangos asperula
- Prangos ferulacea
- Prangos hermonis
- Prasium majus
- Primula acaulis
- Prospero autumnale
- Prospero hanburyi
- Prunella laciniata
- Prunella orientalis
- Prunella vulgaris subsp. vulgaris
- Prunus arabica
- Prunus argentea
- Prunus boissieri
- Prunus cocomilia
- Prunus dulcis
- Prunus korschinskii
- Prunus mahaleb
- Prunus microcarpa
- Prunus prostrata
- Pseudomuscari inconstrictum
- Pseudopimpinella anthriscoides
- Pseudoturritis turrita
- Psilurus incurvus, synonym of Festuca incurvus
- Psychrogeton nigromontanus
- Pteridium aquilinum
- Pteris dentata
- Pteris vittata
- Pterocephalus brevis
- Pterocephalus plumosus
- Pterocephalus pulverulentus
- Ptilostemon chamaepeuce
- Ptilostemon diacantha
- Puccinellia convoluta
- Puccinellia distans
- Pulicaria arabica
- Pulicaria auranitica
- Pulicaria dysenterica
- Pulicaria vulgaris
- Puschkinia scilloides
- Pycreus flavescens subsp. flavescens
- Pycreus flavidus
- Pycreus nitidus
- Pyracantha coccinea
- Pyrus bovei
- Pyrus syriaca

== Q ==
- Quercus brantii
- Quercus cerris
- Quercus coccifera
- Quercus ilex
- Quercus infectoria
- Quercus infectoria subsp. veneris
- Quercus ithaburensis subsp. ithaburensis
- Quercus ithaburensis subsp. macrolepis
- Quercus kotschyana
- Quercus libani
- Quercus look
- Quercus macranthera
- Quercus macranthera subsp. syspirensis
- Quercus petraea
- Quercus petraea subsp. pinnatiloba
- Quercus vulcanica

== R ==
- Radiola linoides
- Radula complanata
- Ranunculus arvensis
- Ranunculus asiaticus
- Ranunculus bulbosus subsp. aleae
- Ranunculus chionophilus
- Ranunculus chius
- Ranunculus constantinopolitanus
- Ranunculus cornutus var. scandicinus
- Ranunculus cornutus
- Ranunculus damascenus
- Ranunculus demissus
- Ranunculus lateriflorus
- Ranunculus marginatus
- Ranunculus millefoliatus
- Ranunculus millefolius subsp. hierosolymitanus
- Ranunculus muricatus
- Ranunculus myosuroides
- Ranunculus neocuneatus
- Ranunculus ophioglossifolius
- Ranunculus orbiculatus
- Ranunculus paludosus subsp. paludosus
- Ranunculus peltatus subsp. sphaerospermus
- Ranunculus peyronii
- Ranunculus pinardii
- Ranunculus sceleratus subsp. sceleratus
- Ranunculus schweinfurthii
- Ranunculus sericeus
- Ranunculus trichophyllus subsp. trichophyllus
- Reboulia hemisphaerica
- Reichardia intermedia
- Reichardia picroides
- Reichardia tingitana subsp. tingitana
- Reseda alba subsp. alba
- Reseda decursiva
- Reseda lutea subsp. lutea
- Reseda luteola
- Reseda orientalis
- Rhagadiolus edulis
- Rhagadiolus stellatus
- Rhamnus alaternus subsp. alaternus
- Rhamnus cathartica
- Rhamnus fallax
- Rhamnus libanotica
- Rhamnus lycioides subsp. graeca
- Rhamnus punctatus
- Rhanteriopsis lanuginosa
- Rhanteriopsis microcephala
- Rhaponticum pygmaeum
- Rheum ribes
- Rhizocephalus orientalis
- Rhododendron ponticum subsp. ponticum
- Rhus coriaria
- Ribes orientale
- Riccia bifurca
- Riccia ciliifera
- Riccia crinita
- Riccia crozalsii
- Riccia crustata
- Riccia crystallina
- Riccia glauca
- Riccia gougetiana
- Riccia lamellosa
- Riccia michelii
- Riccia sorocarpa
- Ricotia lunaria
- Ridolfia segetum
- Robinia pseudoacacia (introduced)
- Rochelia cancellata
- Rochelia disperma
- Rochelia persica
- Roemeria hybrida subsp. dodecandra
- Romulea bulbocodium var. bulbocodium
- Romulea bulbocodium var. crocea
- Romulea columnae subsp. columnae
- Romulea nivalis
- Romulea phoenicia
- Romulea ramiflora
- Rosa canina
- Rosa corymbifera
- Rosa micrantha subsp. micrantha
- Rosa orientalis
- Rosa phoenicia
- Rosa pulverulenta
- Rosa tomentosa
- Rostraria berythea
- Rostraria cristata
- Rostraria obtusiflora
- Rostraria pumila
- Rosularia globulariifolia
- Rosularia serrata
- Rosularia sempervivum subsp. libanotica (syn. Rosularia kesrouanensis)
- Rosularia sempervivum subsp. persica
- Rubia rotundifolia
- Rubia tenuifolia subsp. brachypoda
- Rubia tenuifolia subsp. doniettii
- Rubia tenuifolia subsp. tenuifolia
- Rubia tinctorum
- Rubus bifrons
- Rubus canescens
- Rubus collinus
- Rubus sanctus
- Rubus ulmifolius
- Rumex acetosella subsp. acetosella
- Rumex acetosella subsp. acetoselloides
- Rumex angustifolius subsp. angustifolius
- Rumex angustifolius subsp. libanoticus
- Rumex bucephalophorus subsp. bucephalophorus
- Rumex chalepensis
- Rumex conglomeratus
- Rumex crispus subsp. crispus
- Rumex dentatus subsp. dentatus
- Rumex dentatus subsp. mesopotamicus
- Rumex nepalensis
- Rumex occultans
- Rumex patientia subsp. orientalis
- Rumex patientia subsp. patientia
- Rumex pulcher subsp. cassius
- Rumex pulcher subsp. pulcher
- Rumex pulcher subsp. woodsii
- Rumex pulcher subsp. anodontus
- Rumex sannineus
- Rumex spinosus
- Rumex tuberosus subsp. contractus
- Rumex tuberosus subsp. tuberosus
- Ruppia maritima
- Ruscus aculeatus
- Ruta chalepensis subsp. chalepensis

== S ==
- Sabulina juniperina subsp. Juniperina
- Sabulina mediterranea
- Sabulina mesogitana subsp. mesogitana
- Sabulina tenuifolia subsp. tenuifolia
- Sabulina tenuifolia subsp. turcica
- Sabulina thymifolia
- Sabulina turcomanica
- Saccharum officinarum
- Saccharum ravennae
- Saccharum spontaneum
- Saccharum spontaneum subsp. aegyptiacum
- Saccharum strictum
- Saccobasis polita
- Saccogyna viticulosa
- Sageretia thea subsp. thea
- Sagina apetala
- Sagina libanotica
- Sagina maritima
- Salix acmophylla
- Salix alba subsp. alba
- Salix canariensis)
- Salix excelsa
- Salsola kali
- Salvia aramiensis
- Salvia bracteata
- Salvia cassia
- Salvia ceratophylla
- Salvia dominica
- Salvia drusica
- Salvia fairuziana
- Salvia fruticosa
- Salvia hierosolymitana
- Salvia indica
- Salvia judaica
- Salvia lanigera
- Salvia microstegia
- Salvia montbretii
- Salvia multicaulis
- Salvia nazalena
- Salvia palaestina
- Salvia peyronii
- Salvia pinnata
- Salvia rubifolia
- Salvia russellii
- Salvia samuelssonii
- Salvia sclarea
- Salvia spinosa subsp. spinosa
- Salvia spiraeifolia
- Salvia suffruticosa
- Salvia syriaca
- Salvia tomentosa
- Salvia verbenaca
- Salvia virgata
- Salvia viridis
- Salvia viscosa
- Sambucus ebulus subsp. ebulus
- Sambucus nigra
- Samolus valerandi subsp. valerandi
- Saponaria bargyliana
- Saponaria pumilio
- Saponaria tridentata
- Sarcopoterium spinosum
- Satureja montana
- Satureja montana subsp. pisidia
- Satureja pallaryi
- Satureja thymbra
- Saxifraga cymbalaria subsp. cymbalaria
- Saxifraga hederacea var. libanotica
- Saxifraga hederacea
- Saxifraga tridactylites
- Scabiosa intermedia
- Scabiosa ochroleuca
- Scabiosa webbiana
- Scaligeria napiformis (syn. Scaligeria cretica)
- Scandix australis subsp. grandiflora
- Scandix iberica
- Scandix pecten-veneris subsp. pecten-veneris
- Scandix stellata
- Scandix verna
- Scapania aequiloba
- Scapania aspera
- Scapania calcicola
- Schenkia spicata
- Schismus arabicus
- Schismus barbatus
- Schoenoplectus litoralis subsp. litoralis
- Schoenoplectus tabernaemontani
- Schoenus nigricans
- Scilla bifolia
- Scilla cilicica
- Scilla hyacinthoides
- Scilla libanotica
- Scilla lucis
- Scilla siberica
- Scilla siberica subsp. armena
- Scirpoides holoschoenus subsp. holoschoenus
- Scleranthus orientalis
- Scleranthus verticillatus
- Sclerochloa dura
- Sclerochloa woronowii
- Scolymus grandiflorus
- Scolymus hispanicus subsp. hispanicus
- Scolymus maculatus
- Scorzonera isophylla
- Scorzonera latifolia
- Scorzonera libanotica
- Scorzonera mackmeliana
- Scorzonera mollis subsp. mollis
- Scorzonera papposa
- Scorzonera phaeopappa
- Scorzonera psychrophila
- Scorzonera rigida
- Scorzonera scopariiformis
- Scorzonera syriaca
- Scrophularia hierochuntina
- Scrophularia hypericifolia
- Scrophularia libanotica subsp. libanotica
- Scrophularia peregrina
- Scrophularia peyronii
- Scrophularia rubricaulis
- Scrophularia tagetifolia
- Scrophularia umbrosa subsp. umbrosa
- Scrophularia xanthoglossa
- Scrophularia xylorrhiza
- Scutellaria albida
- Scutellaria albida subsp. subsimilis
- Scutellaria brevibracteata
- Scutellaria brevibracteata subsp. subvelutina
- Scutellaria diffusa
- Scutellaria heterophylla
- Scutellaria megalaspis
- Scutellaria orientalis
- Scutellaria orientalis subsp. cretacea
- Scutellaria tomentosa
- Scutellaria utriculata
- Secale cereale
- Secale montanum
- Senecio bertramii
- Senecio blanchei
- Senecio doriiformis subsp. doriiformis
- Senecio glaucus subsp. coronopifolius
- Senecio glaucus subsp. glaucus
- Senecio glaucus
- Senecio leucanthemifolius subsp. leucanthemifolius
- Senecio vernalis
- Senecio vulgaris subsp. vulgaris
- Serapias orientalis subsp. levantina
- Serapias orientalis subsp. orientalis
- Serapias vomeracea
- Seriphidium sieberi
- Sesamum indicum subsp. indicum
- Sesleria alba
- Setaria helvola
- Setaria italica
- Setaria verticillata
- Setaria viridis
- Sherardia arvensis
- Sideritis libanotica subsp. libanotica
- Sideritis libanotica subsp. linearis
- Sideritis libanotica subsp. microchlamys
- Sideritis montana subsp. montana
- Sideritis montana subsp. remota
- Sideritis perfoliata subsp. perfoliata
- Sideritis pullulans
- Sideritis romana
- Sideritis romana subsp. curvidens
- Sideritis syriaca
- Sideritis syriaca subsp. nusairiensis
- Siebera nana
- Siebera pungens
- Silene aegyptiaca subsp. aegyptiaca
- Silene astartes
- Silene baccifera
- Silene behen
- Silene caryophylloides subsp. stentoria
- Silene cerastoides
- Silene chlorifolia
- Silene colorata subsp. colorata
- Silene coniflora
- Silene conoidea
- Silene crassipes
- Silene cretica
- Silene damascena
- Silene dichotoma subsp. racemosa
- Silene dichotoma subsp. dichotoma
- Silene fuscata
- Silene gallica
- Silene grisea
- Silene italica subsp. italica
- Silene latifolia subsp. alba
- Silene libanotica
- Silene longipetala
- Silene lydia
- Silene macrodonta
- Silene makmeliana
- Silene marschallii subsp. marschallii
- Silene microsperma
- Silene modesta
- Silene muscipula subsp. muscipula
- Silene nocturna subsp. nocturna
- Silene odontopetala subsp. odontopetala
- Silene palaestina
- Silene papillosa
- Silene pharnaceifolia
- Silene reinwardtii
- Silene rubella subsp. Rubella
- Silene schlumbergeri
- Silene sedoides subsp. sedoides
- Silene sefidiana
- Silene siderophila
- Silene stenobotrys
- Silene striata
- Silene succulenta subsp. succulenta
- Silene vulgaris subsp. vulgaris (syn. Silene venosa)
- Silybum marianum
- Sison exaltatum
- Sisymbrium orientale
- Smilax aspera
- Smilax excelsa
- Smyrniopsis syriaca
- Smyrnium connatum
- Smyrnium olusatrum
- Solanum dulcamara
- Solanum villosum
- Solenopsis laurentia
- Solenostoma gracillimum
- Solenostoma hyalinum
- Sonchus bulbosus
- Sonchus glaucescens
- Sonchus oleraceus
- Sonchus tenerrimus subsp. tenerrimus
- Sorbus aria
- Sorbus graeca
- Sorbus kusnetzovii
- Sorbus torminalis
- Sorbus umbellata subsp. umbellata
- Sorbus umbellata subsp. flabellifolia
- Sorghum bicolor
- Sorghum halepense
- Sorghum virgatum
- Southbya nigrella
- Southbya tophacea
- Sparganium erectum subsp. erectum
- Spartium junceum
- Spergula arvensis subsp. arvensis
- Spergularia bocconei
- Spergularia media subsp. media
- Spergularia salina
- Sphaerocarpos michelii
- Sphaerocarpos texanus
- Sphenopus divaricatus
- Spiranthes spiralis
- Spirodela polyrhiza
- Spodiopogon pogonanthus
- Sporobolus ioclados
- Sporobolus pungens
- Sporobolus virginicus
- Stachys annua subsp. ammophila
- Stachys annua subsp. annua
- Stachys arabica
- Stachys arvensis
- Stachys burgsdorffioides subsp. burgsdorffioides
- Stachys cretica
- Stachys cretica subsp. mersinaea
- Stachys cretica subsp. vacillans
- Stachys distans var. distans
- Stachys diversifolia
- Stachys ehrenbergii
- Stachys glandulifera
- Stachys hydrophila
- Stachys iberica subsp. iberica
- Stachys libanotica
- Stachys longispicata
- Stachys neurocalycina
- Stachys nivea (endemic)
- Stachys obscura
- Stachys palaestina
- Stachys paneiana
- Stachys pinetorum
- Stachys pumila
- Stachys rupestris
- Stachys saturejoides
- Stachys spectabilis
- Stachys viticina
- Stachys woronowii
- Stellaria apetala
- Stellaria cilicica
- Stellaria media
- Stellaria neglecta subsp. cupaniana
- Stellaria postii
- Steptorhampus tuberosus **
- Sternbergia clusiana
- Sternbergia colchiciflora
- Sternbergia lutea
- Sternbergia pulchella
- Sternbergia vernalis
- Stipa arabica
- Stipa barbata
- Stipa capensis
- Stipa ehrenbergiana
- Stipa hohenackeriana
- Stipa holosericea
- Stipa parviflora
- Stipagrostis ciliata
- Stipagrostis lanata
- Stipagrostis obtusa
- Stipagrostis plumosa
- Stipagrostis scoparia
- Stizolophus balsamita
- Struthiopteris spicant
- Stuckenia pectinata
- Styrax officinalis
- Symphytum brachycalyx
- Synelcosciadium carmeli

== T ==
- Taeniatherum caput-medusae
- Tamarix gennessarensis
- Tamarix hohenackeri
- Tamarix nilotica
- Tamarix smyrnensis
- Tamarix tetragyna
- Tamarix tetrandra
- Tanacetum argenteum subsp. argenteum
- Tanacetum argenteum subsp. canum
- Tanacetum aucheri
- Tanacetum cilicium
- Tanacetum densum subsp. densum
- Tanacetum parthenium
- Tanacetum praeteritum subsp. praeteritum
- Tanacetum tomentellum
- Tanacetum yabrudae
- Taraxacum aleppicum
- Taraxacum apollinis
- Taraxacum assemanii
- Taraxacum bessarabicum
- Taraxacum bithynicum
- Taraxacum brevirostre
- Taraxacum cinnamomeum
- Taraxacum haussknechtii
- Taraxacum kurdiciforme
- Taraxacum laxum
- Taraxacum microcephaloides
- Taraxacum minimum
- Taraxacum officinale
- Taraxacum phaleratum
- Taraxacum serotinum
- Taraxacum sonchoides
- Taraxacum syriacum
- Targionia hypophylla
- Targionia lorbeeriana
- Telephium imperati subsp. orientale
- Tetrapogon villosus
- Teucrium antilibanoticum
- Teucrium capitatum
- Teucrium capitatum subsp. capitatum
- Teucrium chamaedrys
- Teucrium chamaedrys subsp. tauricola
- Teucrium coniortodes
- Teucrium creticum
- Teucrium divaricatum subsp. divaricatum
- Teucrium divaricatum subsp. graecum
- Teucrium haradjanii
- Teucrium heterotrichum
- Teucrium montbretii subsp. libanoticum
- Teucrium montbretii subsp. montbretii
- Teucrium multicaule subsp. multicaule
- Teucrium multicaule subsp. planifolium
- Teucrium oliverianum
- Teucrium orientale var. orientale
- Teucrium paederotoides
- Teucrium parviflorum
- Teucrium procerum
- Teucrium pruinosum
- Teucrium rigidum
- Teucrium scordium subsp. scordioides
- Teucrium scordium subsp. scordium
- Teucrium socinianum
- Teucrium spinosum
- Teucrium stachyophyllum
- Thalictrum isopyroides
- Thalictrum orientale
- Theligonum cynocrambe
- Themeda quadrivalvis
- Themeda triandra
- Thesium arvense
- Thesium bergeri
- Thesium billardieri
- Thesium humile
- Thinopyrum elongatum
- Thinopyrum intermedium
- Thinopyrum junceum
- Thlaspi kotschyanum (syn. Thlaspi brevicaule
- Thuspeinanta persica
- Thymbra capitata
- Thymbra spicata subsp. spicata
- Thymelaea aucheri
- Thymelaea gussonei
- Thymelaea hirsuta
- Thymelaea passerina
- Thymus alfredae
- Thymus cilicicus
- Thymus eigii
- Thymus kotschyanus subsp. kotschyanus
- Thymus leucotrichus subsp. leucotrichus
- Thymus syriacus var. syriacus
- Tolpis umbellata
- Tolpis virgata subsp. virgata
- Tordylium aegyptiacum
- Tordylium cordatum
- Tordylium syriacum
- Tordylium trachycarpa
- Torilis africana
- Torilis arvensis subsp. arvensis
- Torilis chrysocarpa
- Torilis leptophylla var. erythrotricha
- Torilis nodosa subsp. nodosa
- Torilis trichosperma
- Tragopogon buphthalmoides
- Tragopogon porrifolius subsp. longirostris
- Tragopogon pterocarpus
- Tribulus terrestris
- Tricholaena teneriffae
- Trifolium angustifolium
- Trifolium arvense
- Trifolium billardieri
- Trifolium boissieri
- Trifolium campestre
- Trifolium clusii
- Trifolium clypeatum
- Trifolium formosum
- Trifolium fragiferum
- Trifolium globosum
- Trifolium lagrangei
- Trifolium lappaceum
- Trifolium pauciflorum
- Trifolium physodes
- Trifolium pilulare
- Trifolium purpureum
- Trifolium repens
- Trifolium resupinatum
- Trifolium sannineum
- Trifolium scabrum
- Trifolium speciosum
- Trifolium stellatum
- Trifolium tomentosum
- Trifolium xerocephalum
- Trigonella berythea
- Trigonella cylindracea
- Trigonella filipes
- Trigonella spinosa
- Tripleurospermum auriculatum
- Tripleurospermum caucasicum
- Tripleurospermum sannineum
- Trisetaria glumacea
- Trisetaria koelerioides
- Trisetaria linearis
- Trisetaria loeflingiana
- Trisetum flavescens
- Triticum compactum
- Triticum dicoccoides
- Triticum monococcum subsp. aegilopoides
- Triticum turgidum subsp. dicoccum
- Triticum turgidum subsp. durum
- Triticum urartu
- Tuberaria guttata subsp. guttata
- Tulipa agenensis
- Tulipa aleppensis
- Tulipa aucheriana
- Tulipa biflora
- Tulipa humilis
- Tulipa julia
- Tulipa montana
- Tulipa systola
- Turgenia latifolia
- Turgeniopsis foeniculacea
- Tussilago farfara
- Typha angustifolia
- Typha domingensis
- Typha latifolia
- Tyrimnus leucographus

== U ==
- Ulmus minor subsp. minor
- Umbilicus erectus
- Umbilicus horizontalis
- Umbilicus horizontalis var. intermedius
- Umbilicus rupestris
- Urospermum picroides
- Urginea maritima
- Urochloa mutica
- Urtica dioica
- Urtica fragilis
- Urtica membranacea
- Urtica pilulifera
- Urtica urens

== V ==
- Vaccaria grandiflora
- Vaccaria hispanica
- Vaccaria liniflora
- Vaccaria oxyodonta
- Vachellia farnesiana
- Vagaria parviflora
- Valantia hispida var. eburnea
- Valantia hispida var. hispida
- Valantia muralis var. muralis
- Valeriana dioscoridis
- Valerianella antilibanotica
- Valerianella carinata
- Valerianella coronata
- Valerianella dactylophylla
- Valerianella discoidea
- Valerianella echinata
- Valerianella eriocarpa
- Valerianella kotschyi
- Valerianella obtusiloba
- Valerianella orientalis
- Valerianella oxyrrhyncha
- Valerianella szovitsiana
- Valerianella tuberculata
- Valerianella vesicaria
- Vallisneria spiralis
- Velezia fasciculata
- Velezia rigida
- Ventenata blanchei
- Ventenata macra
- Verbascum agrimoniifolium subsp. agrimoniifolium
- Verbascum aliciae
- Verbascum antilibanoticum
- Verbascum antiochium
- Verbascum berytheum
- Verbascum blancheanum
- Verbascum caesareum
- Verbascum cedreti
- Verbascum damascenum
- Verbascum gaillardotii
- Verbascum galilaeum
- Verbascum geminiflorum
- Verbascum leptostachyum
- Verbascum levanticum
- Verbascum libanoticum
- Verbascum oreophilum
- Verbascum orientale subsp. orientale
- Verbascum porteri
- Verbascum ptychophyllum
- Verbascum qulebicum
- Verbascum sinaiticum
- Verbascum sinuatum
- Verbascum tiberiadis
- Verbascum tripolitanum
- Verbascum tropidocarpum
- Verbena supina
- Veronica anagallis-aquatica subsp. anagallis-aquatica
- Veronica anagallis-aquatica subsp. lysimachioides
- Veronica anagalloides subsp. anagalloides
- Veronica anagalloides subsp. heureka
- Veronica arvensis
- Veronica beccabunga subsp. abscondita
- Veronica beccabunga subsp. beccabunga
- Veronica biloba
- Veronica bombycina
- Veronica caespitosa subsp. leiophylla
- Veronica campylopoda
- Veronica cymbalaria
- Veronica hederifolia
- Veronica hispidula
- Veronica leiocarpa
- Veronica macrostachya
- Veronica michauxii
- Veronica orientalis
- Veronica panormitana subsp. Bardostensis
- Veronica persica
- Veronica polifolia
- Veronica polita
- Veronica pusilla
- Veronica reuterana
- Veronica scardica
- Veronica syriaca
- Veronica triloba
- Veronica triphyllos
- Veronica viscosa
- Viburnum tinus
- Vicia canescens
- Vicia cuspidata
- Vicia narbonensis
- Vicia peregrina
- Vicia tenuifolia
- Vinca herbacea
- Vinca herbacea subsp. libanotica
- Vinca major
- Vincetoxicum canescens
- Vincetoxicum dionysiense
- Viola heldreichiana
- Viola libanotica
- Viola modesta
- Viola occulta
- Viola odorata
- Viola parvula
- Viola pentadactyla
- Viola sieheana
- Viscum album
- Visnaga daucoides
- Vitex agnus-castus
- Vulpia brevis
- Vulpia bromoides
- Vulpia ciliata
- Vulpia fasciculata
- Vulpia membranacea
- Vulpia muralis
- Vulpia myuros
- Vulpia pectinella
- Vulpia persica
- Vulpia unilateralis

== W ==
- Washingtonia filifera (introduced)
- Withania somnifera subsp. somnifera
- Wolffia arrhiza

== X ==
- Xanthium echinatum (introduced)
- Xanthium spinosum (introduced)
- Xanthium strumarium (introduced)
- Xeranthemum cylindraceum
- Xeranthemum inapertum
- Xeranthemum longipapposum

== Z ==
- Zannichellia palustris subsp. palustris
- Zannichellia palustris subsp. pedicellata
- Zingeria trichopoda
- Ziziphora capitata subsp. capitata
- Ziziphora capitata subsp. orientalis
- Ziziphora taurica
- Ziziphora taurica subsp. taurica
- Ziziphora tenuior
- Ziziphus jujuba
- Ziziphus spina-christi
- Zoegea leptaurea subsp. leptaurea
- Zygophyllum eurypterum
- Zygophyllum fabago subsp. fabago
