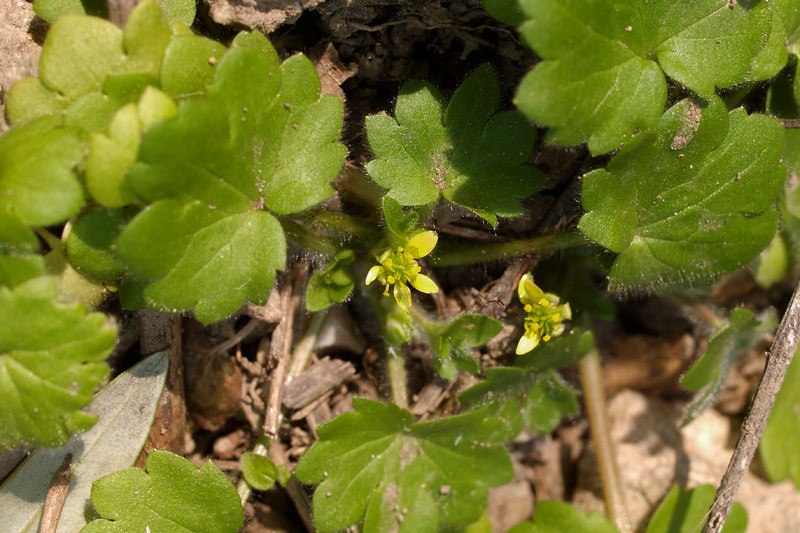

Scientific classification
- Kingdom: Plantae
- Clade: Tracheophytes
- Clade: Angiosperms
- Clade: Eudicots
- Order: Ranunculales
- Family: Ranunculaceae
- Genus: Ranunculus
- Species: R. chius

Binomial name
- Ranunculus chius DC.

= Ranunculus chius =

Species of plant

Ranunculus chius is a species of plant in the family Ranunculaceae.
