= Paronychia macrosepala =

Scientific classification
- Kingdom: Plantae
- Clade: Tracheophytes
- Clade: Angiosperms
- Clade: Eudicots
- Order: Caryophyllales
- Family: Caryophyllaceae
- Genus: Paronychia
- Species: P. macrosepala

Binomial name
- Paronychia macrosepala Boiss.

Synonyms
- Paronychia capitata subsp. macrosepala

Species of plant

Paronychia macrosepala is a species of plant in the family Caryophyllaceae (carpetweeds).

== Sources ==
This article incorporates text from a free content work. Licensed under CC0 (license statement/permission). Text taken from Paronychia macrosepala. Encyclopedia of Life.
