= Allium calyptratum =

Scientific classification
- Kingdom: Plantae
- Clade: Embryophytes
- Clade: Tracheophytes
- Clade: Spermatophytes
- Clade: Angiosperms
- Clade: Monocots
- Order: Asparagales
- Family: Amaryllidaceae
- Subfamily: Allioideae
- Genus: Allium
- Species: A. calyptratum

Binomial name
- Allium calyptratum Boiss.

Species of flowering plant

Allium calyptratum is a species of flowering plant in the Amaryllidaceae family. It is found in Israel, Syria, Palestine and Turkey. It is a bulb-forming perennial with an umbel of white flowers.
