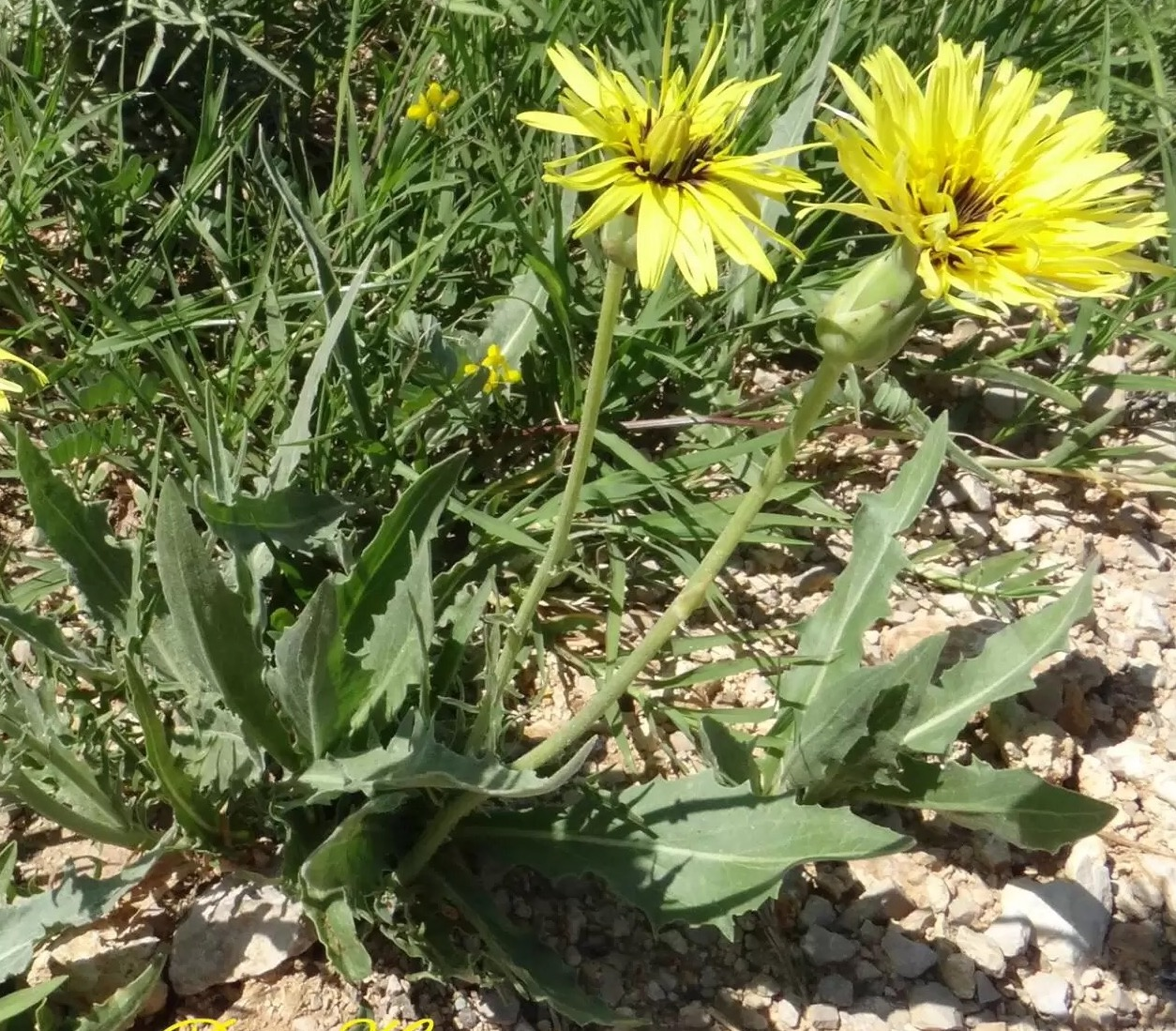

Scientific classification
- Kingdom: Plantae
- Clade: Tracheophytes
- Clade: Angiosperms
- Clade: Eudicots
- Clade: Asterids
- Order: Asterales
- Family: Asteraceae
- Genus: Pseudopodospermum
- Species: P. libanoticum

Binomial name
- Pseudopodospermum libanoticum (Boiss.) Zaika, Sukhor. & N.Kilian

Synonyms
- Aslia libanotica (Boiss.) Yıld.; Scorzonera libanotica Boiss.

= Pseudopodospermum libanoticum =

Species of floweing plant

Pseudopodospermum libanoticum, also known as Lebanese salsify and Lebanese viper's grass, is a species of perennial plant in the family Asteraceae.

== Description ==
Pseudopodospermum libanoticum grows to a height of 15 to 80 cm (5.9 to 31.5 in) and is covered with fluffy detersile coating. Its erect flower stems are leafy and branched in the upper part into 3-5 floral heads measuring 2 to 4 cm (0.79 to 1.57 in). The flower heads are supported by a scaly receptacles atop long pedicels. It has glabrous cylindrical involucral bracts that are truncated at the base and slightly constricted at the top. The yellow flowers turn purple-red at the base and are larger than the involucre. It blooms in June and July. The fruit is a white, thick, long and deeply furrowed achene surmounted by a small pappus. P. libanoticum leaves are whole, slightly toothed towards the base, oblong or oblong-lanceolate, more or less acute that narrow at the petiole.

== Distribution and habitat ==
Pseudopodospermum libanoticum is endemic to the mountainous regions of the Levant in Lebanon and Syria; it grows in elevated meadows and pastures, rocky and grassy grounds, and old wall cracks

== Uses ==
The plant is used in folk medicine, its aerial parts are made into a decoction used orally to treat headaches. The plant's raw young shoots and leaves are edible.
