= Allium erdelii =

Scientific classification
- Kingdom: Plantae
- Clade: Tracheophytes
- Clade: Angiosperms
- Clade: Monocots
- Order: Asparagales
- Family: Amaryllidaceae
- Subfamily: Allioideae
- Genus: Allium
- Species: A. erdelii

Binomial name
- Allium erdelii Zucc.

Synonyms
- Allium erdelii var. hirtellum Oppenh.; Allium erdelii var. micranthum Oppenh.; Allium erdelii var. pilosum Pamp.; Allium erdelii var. roseum Boiss.; Allium philistaeum Boiss.

Species of plant

Allium erdelii is a plant species found in Israel, Palestine Lebanon, Syria, Iraq, Egypt, Libya and Jordan. It is a bulb-forming perennial with a small umbel of creamy-white flowers.
