= Allium sannineum =

Conservation status
- Endangered (IUCN 3.1)

Scientific classification
- Kingdom: Plantae
- Clade: Tracheophytes
- Clade: Angiosperms
- Clade: Monocots
- Order: Asparagales
- Family: Amaryllidaceae
- Subfamily: Allioideae
- Genus: Allium
- Species: A. sannineum

Binomial name
- Allium sannineum Gomb.

Species of flowering plant

Allium sannineum (Arabic ثوم صنين) is a plant species found in the Levant (Syria, Israel, Palestine, Jordan and Lebanon). It is a bulb-forming perennial with an umbel of flowers crowded together, resembling a head. Their tepals are deep blue of violet with fringed edges.

They can found at elevations between 1800 and 2300 m.
