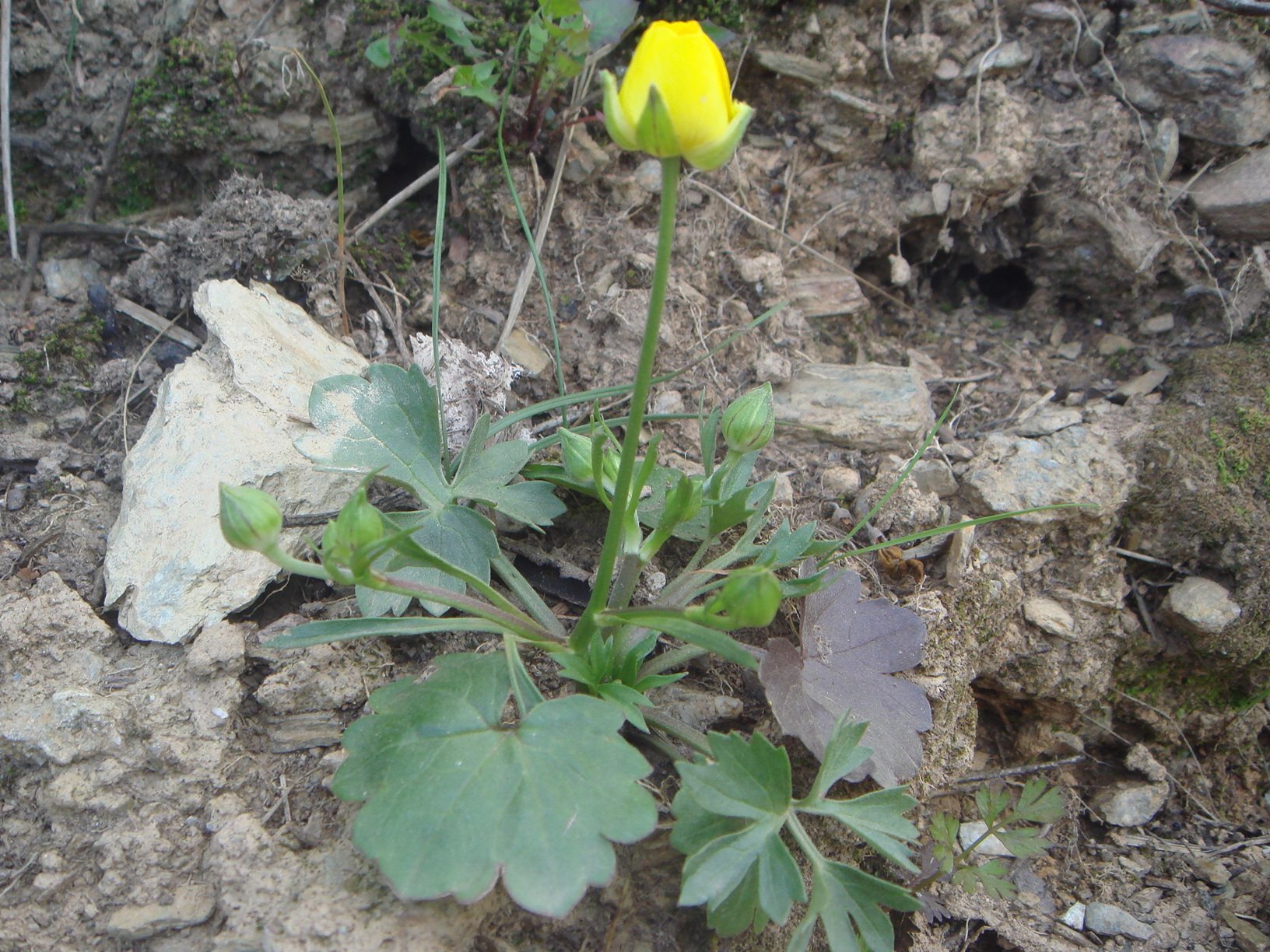

Scientific classification
- Kingdom: Plantae
- Clade: Tracheophytes
- Clade: Angiosperms
- Clade: Eudicots
- Order: Ranunculales
- Family: Ranunculaceae
- Genus: Ranunculus
- Species: R. paludosus

Binomial name
- Ranunculus paludosus Poir.

= Ranunculus paludosus =

Species of plant

Ranunculus paludosus is a species of perennial herb in the family Ranunculaceae. They have a self-supporting growth form and simple, broad leaves. Individuals can grow to 0.23 m.

== Sources ==
This article incorporates text from a free content work. Licensed under CC0 (license statement/permission). Text taken from Ranunculus paludosus. Encyclopedia of Life.
