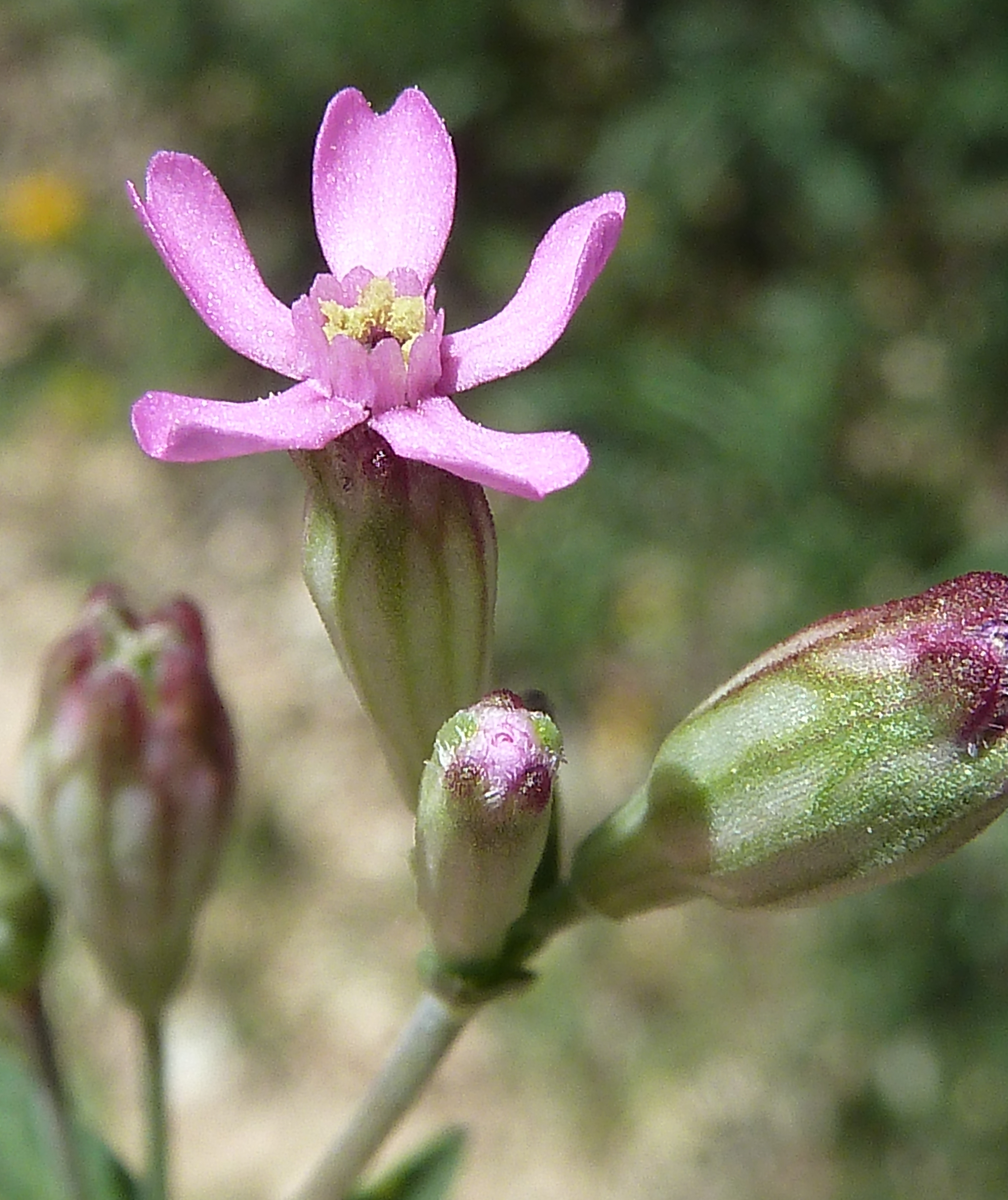

Scientific classification
- Kingdom: Plantae
- Clade: Tracheophytes
- Clade: Angiosperms
- Clade: Eudicots
- Order: Caryophyllales
- Family: Caryophyllaceae
- Genus: Silene
- Species: S. rubella

Binomial name
- Silene rubella L.

Synonyms
- Oncerum rubellum (L.) Dulac; Silene armeria Asso; Silene babylonica Boiss. & Noë; Silene crispa Poir.; Silene erigens Willd. ex Rohrb.; Silene glutinosa Dufour ex Cambess.; Silene inaperta DC.; Silene pseudolinum Ramond ex DC.; Silene undulata Pourr. ex Willk. & Lange

= Silene rubella =

Species of flowering plant

Silene rubella is a species of flowering plant in the family Caryophyllaceae.

The plant live along dry-farmed fields. The flowers have red petals and the calyx is also reddish.

The species is native to Cyprus, Egypt, Iran, Iraq, Italy, Lebanon, Syria, Morocco, Portugal, Spain, Tunisia, and in countries that used to made up Yugoslavia. It is also native to Western Sahara. In Egypt among winter weeds this species is rare.
