= Allium drusorum =

Scientific classification
- Kingdom: Plantae
- Clade: Tracheophytes
- Clade: Angiosperms
- Clade: Monocots
- Order: Asparagales
- Family: Amaryllidaceae
- Subfamily: Allioideae
- Genus: Allium
- Species: A. drusorum

Binomial name
- Allium drusorum Feinbrun

Species of flowering plant

Allium drusorum is a plant species in the amaryllis family. It is endemic to Syria.
