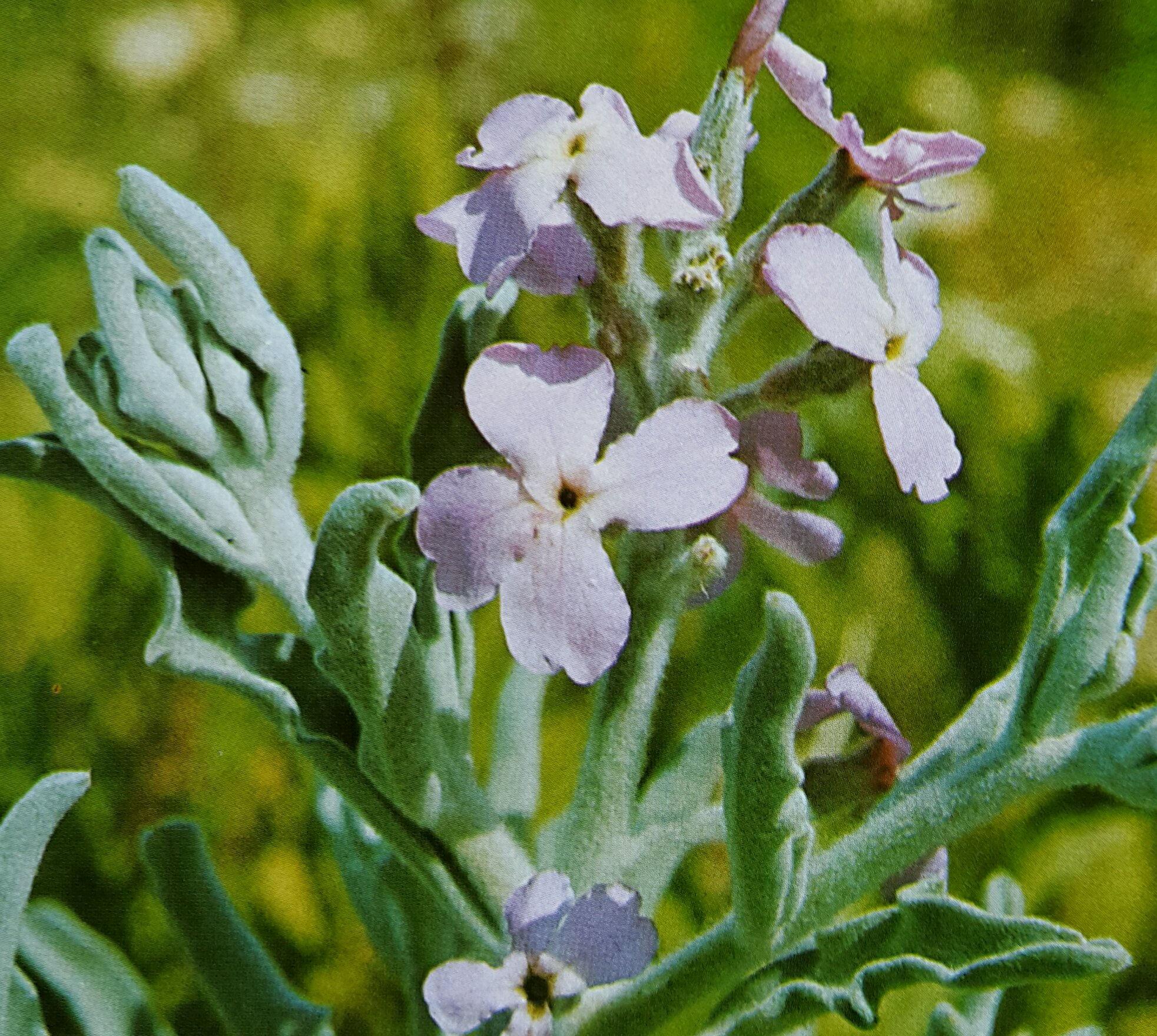

Scientific classification
- Kingdom: Plantae
- Clade: Embryophytes
- Clade: Tracheophytes
- Clade: Angiosperms
- Clade: Eudicots
- Clade: Rosids
- Order: Brassicales
- Family: Brassicaceae
- Genus: Matthiola
- Species: M. crassifolia

Binomial name
- Matthiola crassifolia Boiss. & Gaill.

Synonyms
- Hesperis integrifolia Kuntze

= Matthiola crassifolia =

Species of flowering plant

Matthiola crassifolia, the thick-leaved stock, is a species of plant in the family Brassicaceae.

== Description ==
Perennial, tomentose. Roots very thick. Flowering stems 20–80 cm. Radical leaves pinnatifid, sinuate or entire, reaching 16 cm long. Cauline leaves entire or folded on margins. Sepals white. 1 cm long. Petals 20 mm, purple pink. Siliques 10 cm long over 4 mm wide, not tapered at apex. Stigma with two lateral projections at base. It is an endangered species.

== Flowering ==
February–May.

== Habitat ==
Littoral rocks.

== Distribution ==
Littoral-coast.

== Geographic area ==
The thick-leaved stock, which adorns the rocks of Ras-Beirut in particular as of February, is endemic to Lebanon. Its generic name was coined to render homage to P.A. Matthioli, the Italian physician and famous botanist of the sixteenth century.
