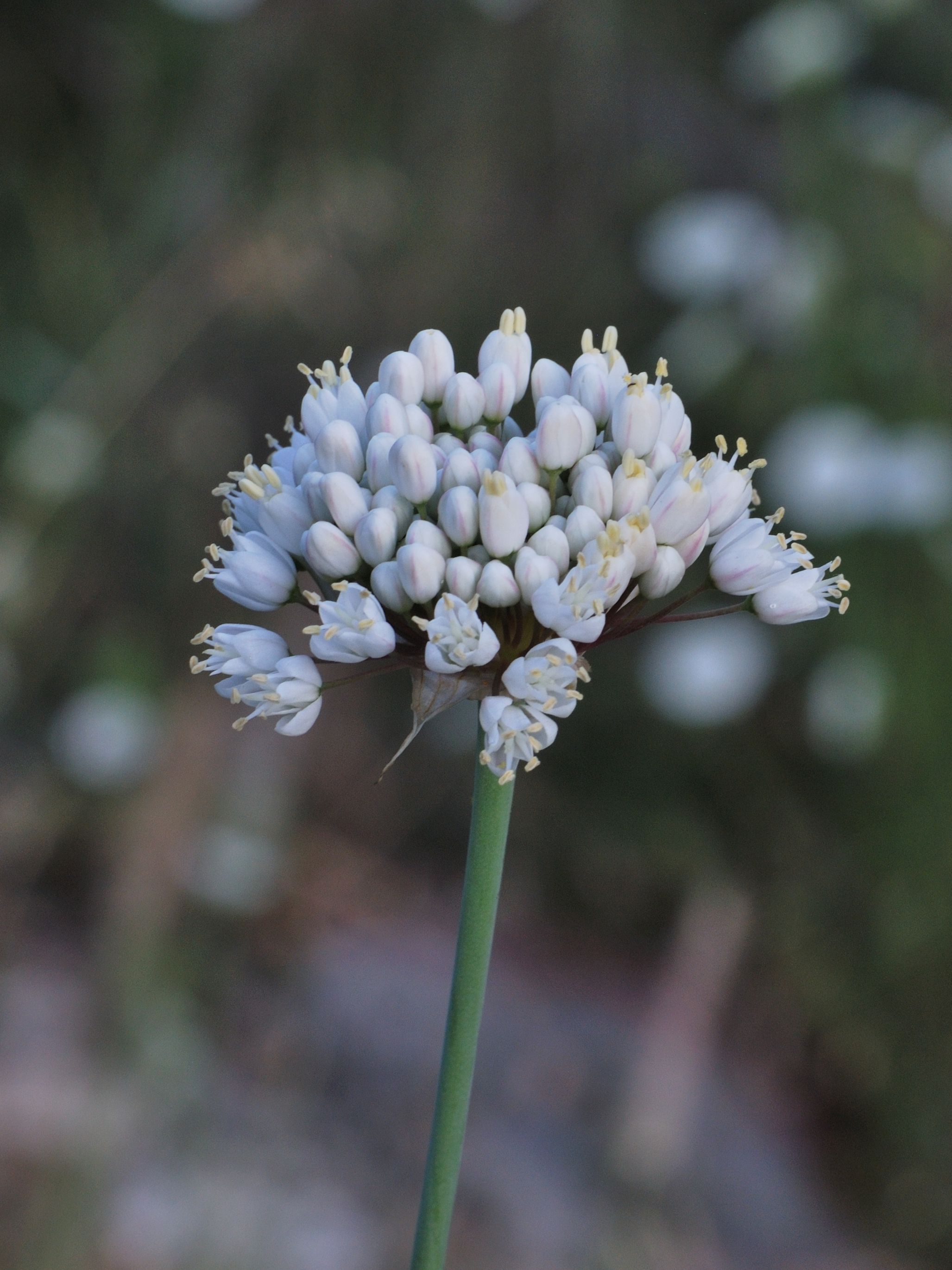

Conservation status
- Near Threatened (IUCN 3.1)

Scientific classification
- Kingdom: Plantae
- Clade: Embryophytes
- Clade: Tracheophytes
- Clade: Spermatophytes
- Clade: Angiosperms
- Clade: Monocots
- Order: Asparagales
- Family: Amaryllidaceae
- Subfamily: Allioideae
- Genus: Allium
- Species: A. carmeli

Binomial name
- Allium carmeli Boiss.

Synonyms
- Allium trichocoleum Bornm.

= Allium carmeli =

Species of flowering plant

Allium carmeli is a species of perennial in the Amaryllidaceae family. It is found in Israel, Syria and Lebanon.

The specific epithet, carmeli, refers to Mount Carmel in northern Israel.

== Description ==
Allium carmeli grows from 60 to 100 centimeters (2–3.3 feet) tall and flowers in late spring. The color of its flowers range from a white to a purple.
