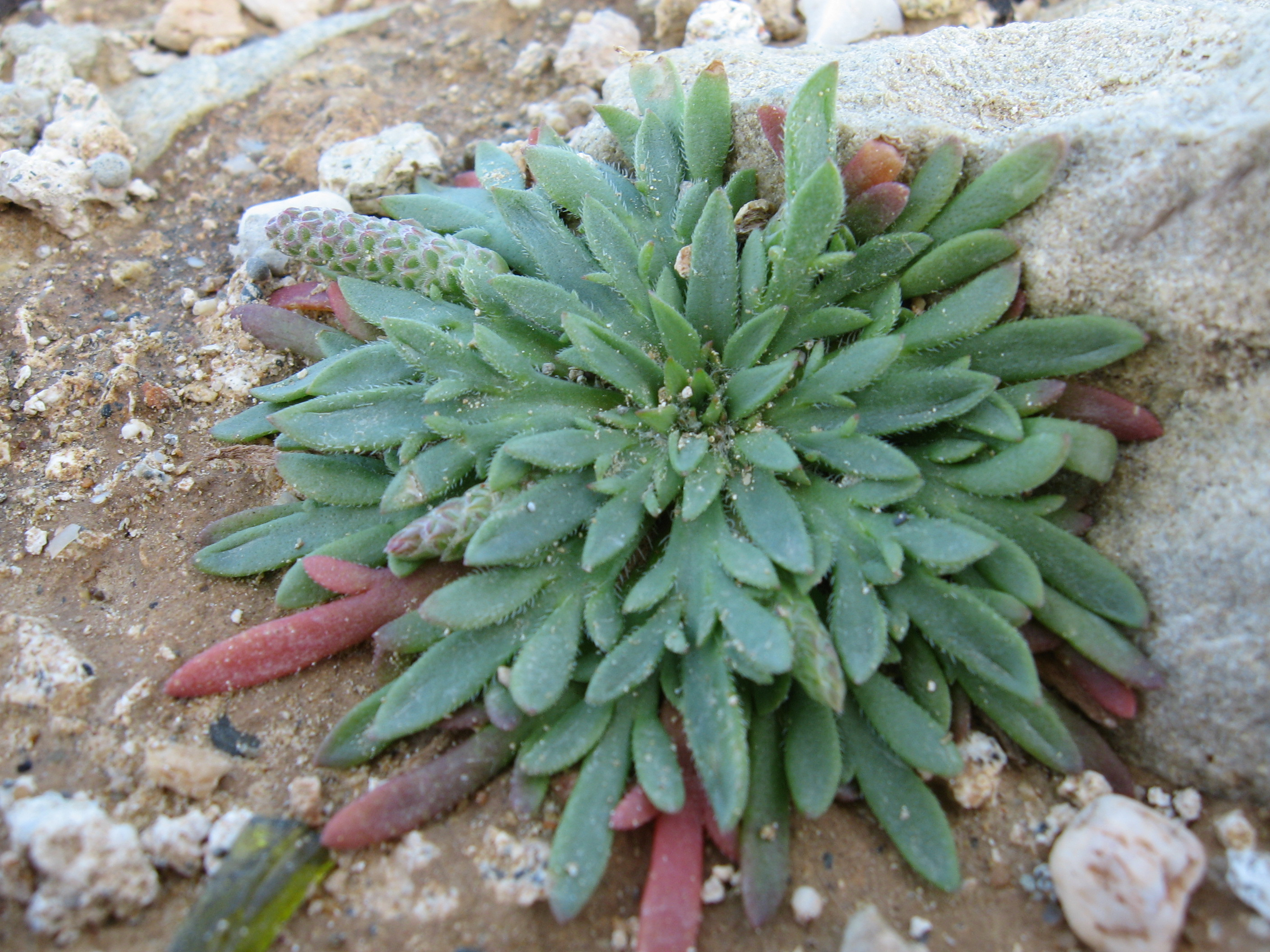

Scientific classification
- Kingdom: Plantae
- Clade: Tracheophytes
- Clade: Angiosperms
- Clade: Eudicots
- Clade: Asterids
- Order: Lamiales
- Family: Plantaginaceae
- Genus: Plantago
- Species: P. weldenii

Binomial name
- Plantago weldenii Rchb.

Synonyms
- Plantago coronopus subsp. weldenii

= Plantago weldenii =

Species of plant

Plantago weldenii is a species of annual herb in the family Plantaginaceae. They have a self-supporting growth form. Individuals can grow to 3.2 centimetres (1.3 in).

== Sources ==
This article incorporates text from a free content work. Licensed under CC0 (license statement/permission). Text taken from Plantago weldenii. Encyclopedia of Life.
