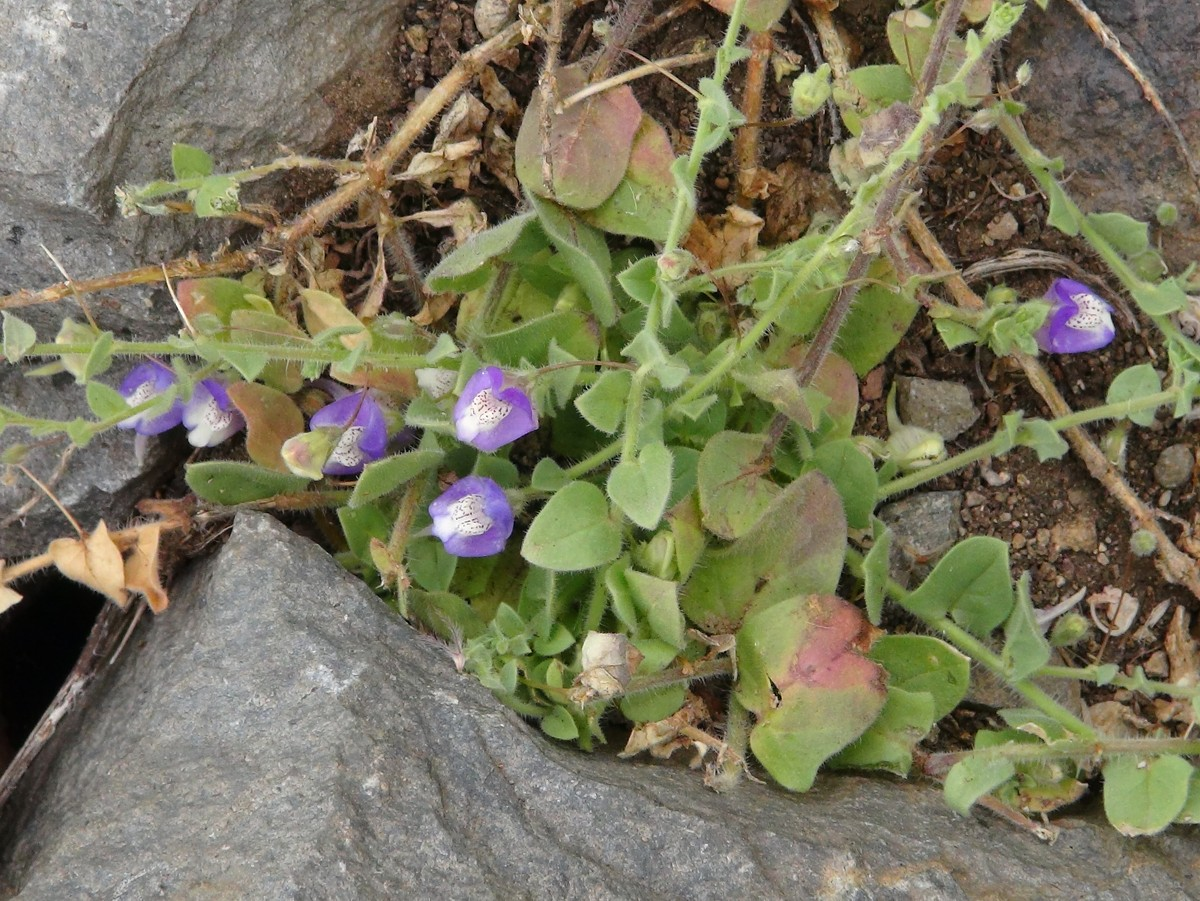

Scientific classification
- Kingdom: Plantae
- Clade: Tracheophytes
- Clade: Angiosperms
- Clade: Eudicots
- Clade: Asterids
- Order: Lamiales
- Family: Plantaginaceae
- Genus: Kickxia
- Species: K. commutata

Binomial name
- Kickxia commutata (Bernh. ex Rchb.) Fritsch

Synonyms
- Linaria commutata

= Kickxia commutata =

Species of plant

Kickxia commutata, the Mediterranean fluellen, is a species of perennial herb in the family Plantaginaceae. They have a self-supporting growth form and simple, broad leaves. Individuals can grow to 5 cm tall.

== Sources ==
This article incorporates text from a free content work. Licensed under CC0 (license statement/permission). Text taken from Kickxia commutata. Encyclopedia of Life.
