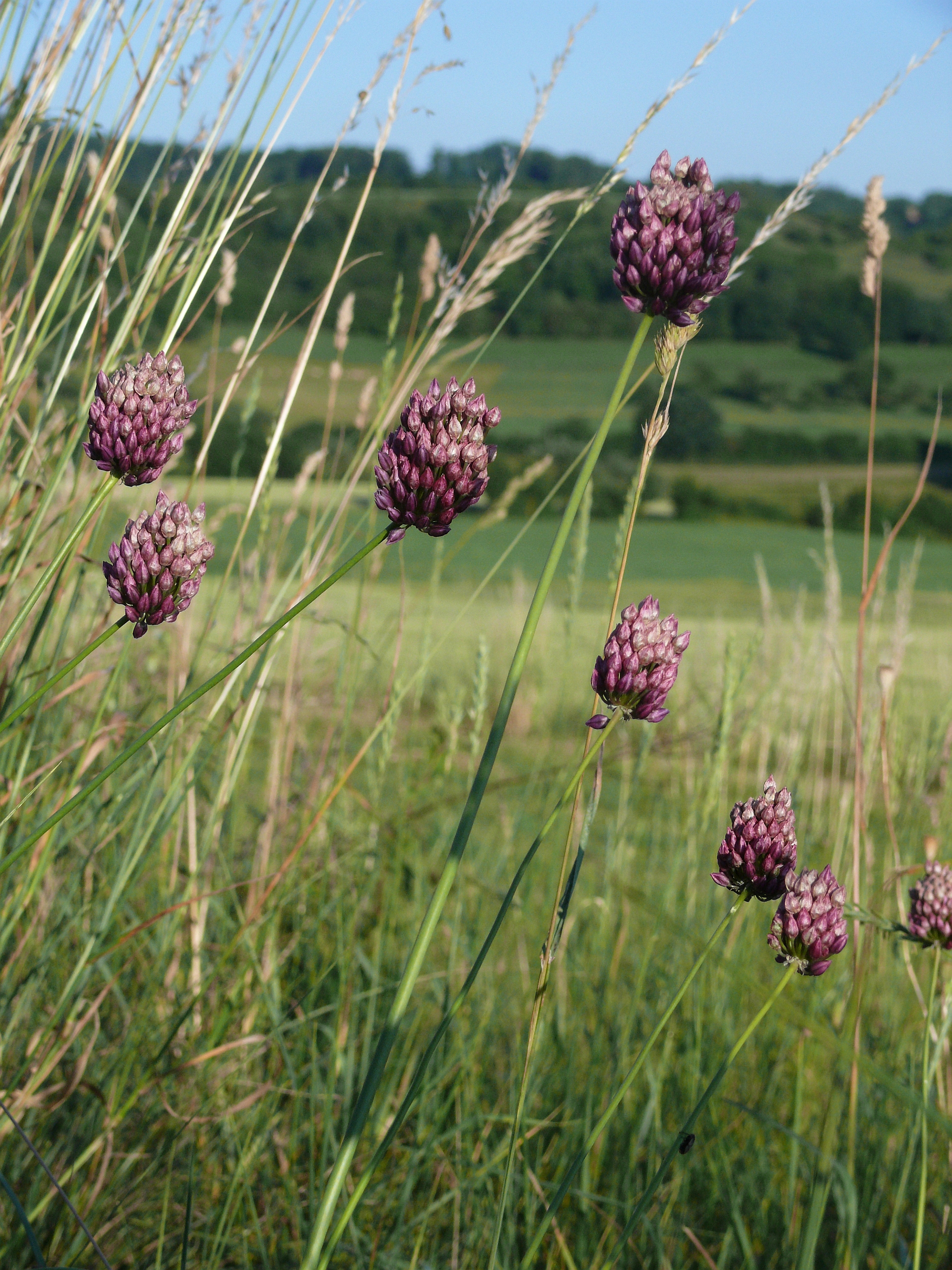

Scientific classification
- Kingdom: Plantae
- Clade: Tracheophytes
- Clade: Angiosperms
- Clade: Monocots
- Order: Asparagales
- Family: Amaryllidaceae
- Subfamily: Allioideae
- Genus: Allium
- Subgenus: A. subg. Allium
- Species: A. rotundum

Binomial name
- Allium rotundum L. 1762 not All. 1785 nor Wimm. & Grab. 1824

Synonyms
- Synonymy: Allium ampeloprasum Thunb. 1794, illegitimate homonym not L. 1753; Allium ampeloprasum var. paterfamilias (Boiss.) Nyman; Allium ampeloprasum subsp. paterfamilias (Boiss.) K.Richt.; Allium baumannianum K.Koch; Allium cambiasii De Not.; Allium cilicicum Boiss.; Allium descendens Pall. ex Schult. & Schult.f. 1830, illegitimate homonym not L. 1753; Allium erectum G.Don; Allium gracilescens Sommier & Levier; Allium jajlae Vved.; Allium jajlae var. baidarense Seregin; Allium multiflorum Kunth 1843, illegitimate homonym not Desf. 1798; Allium paterfamilias Boiss.; Allium porphyroprasum Heldr. & Sart. ex Boiss.; Allium preslianum Schult. & Schult.f.; Allium rotundifolium Lumn. ex Steud.; Allium rubellum C.Presl; Allium rubicundum Niven ex G.Don; Allium scariosum Jan ex Schult. & Schult.f.; Allium scorodoprasum subsp. jajlae (Vved.) Stearn; Allium scorodoprasum subsp. rotundum (L.) Stearn; Allium scorodoprasum subsp. waldsteinii (G.Don) Stearn; Allium tmoleum O.Schwarz; Allium waldsteinianum Schult. & Schult.f.; Allium waldsteinii G.Don; Porrum polyanthum Fourr.; Porrum rotundum (L.) Rchb.

= Allium rotundum =

Species of flowering plant

Allium rotundum, common name round-headed leek or purple-flowered garlic, is a Eurasian and North African species of wild onion. Its native range extends from Spain and Morocco to Iran and European Russia. It is sparingly naturalized in parts of the United States (Michigan and Iowa). The species grows in disturbed habitats such as roadsides, cultivated fields, etc.

Allium rotundum produces large clumps of as many as 50 egg-shaped bulbs, each up to 1.5 cm long. Leaves are up to 40 cm long. Scapes are up to 90 cm tall. Umbels look round from a distance, and can contain as many as 200 flowers. Flowers are bell-shaped, up to 7 mm across; tepals purple, sometimes with white margins; anthers yellow or purple; pollen yellow or white.
