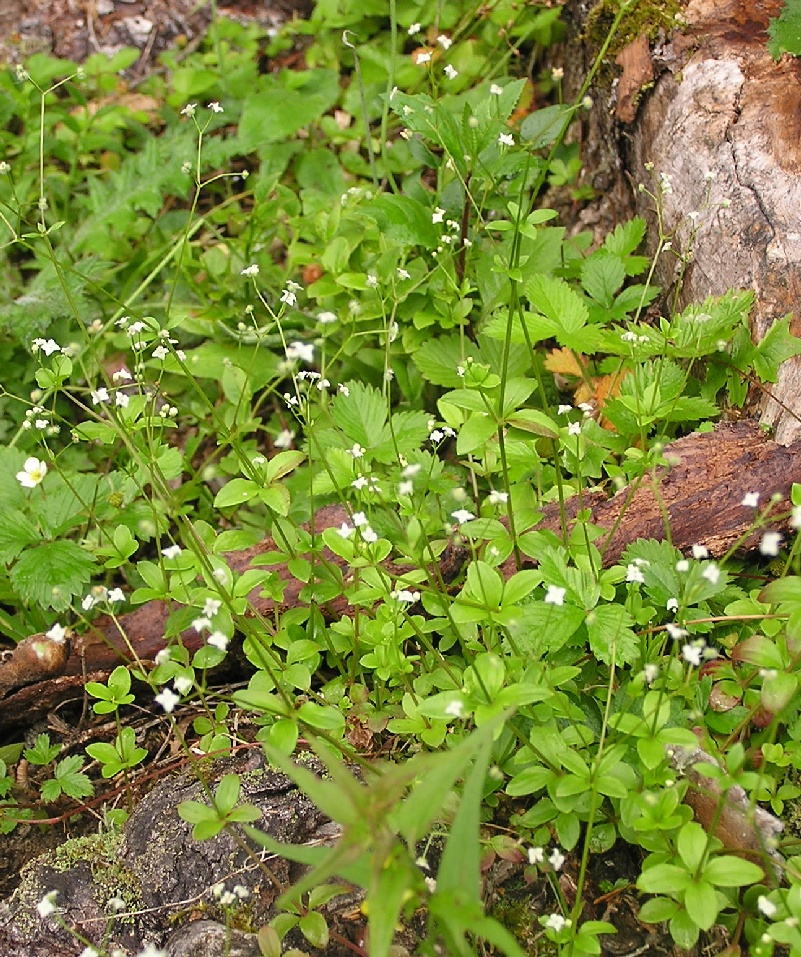

Scientific classification
- Kingdom: Plantae
- Clade: Tracheophytes
- Clade: Angiosperms
- Clade: Eudicots
- Clade: Asterids
- Order: Gentianales
- Family: Rubiaceae
- Genus: Galium
- Species: G. rotundifolium

Binomial name
- Galium rotundifolium L.

= Galium rotundifolium =

Round-leaved bedstraw

Species of plant

Galium rotundifolium (round-leaved bedstraw) is a plant species of the Rubiaceae. It is widespread across most of Europe, with the range extending into Morocco, the Caucasus, and southwest Asia from Turkey to Afghanistan. There are also reports of isolated populations in Vietnam, Sabah and Java.

Galium rotundifolium is an erect herb. Leaves are broadly ovate, almost round, usually in whorls of 4, with prominent veins. Flowers are in a widely branching terminal panicle. Fruits are green, with long hooked hairs.
