= Allium feinbergii =

Scientific classification
- Kingdom: Plantae
- Clade: Tracheophytes
- Clade: Angiosperms
- Clade: Monocots
- Order: Asparagales
- Family: Amaryllidaceae
- Subfamily: Allioideae
- Genus: Allium
- Species: A. feinbergii

Binomial name
- Allium feinbergii Oppenh.

Species of flowering plant

Allium feinbergii is a species of onions found on Mount Hermon, near where the three nations of Israel, Syria, and Lebanon meet. It is a bulb-forming perennial producing an umbel of flowers. Flowers are reddish-purple, narrowly urn-shaped, on long peduncles so that most of them are drooping.
