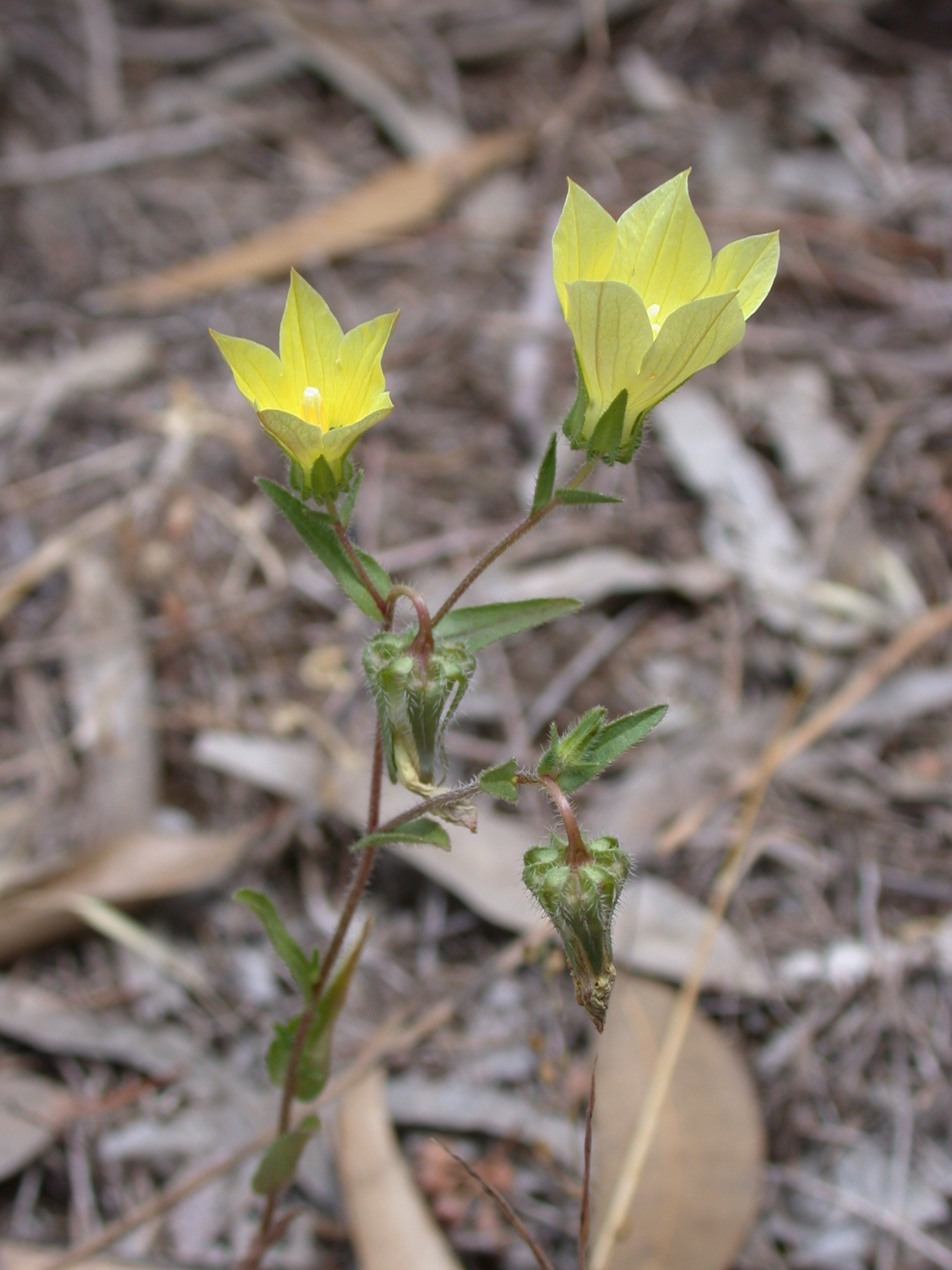

Scientific classification
- Kingdom: Plantae
- Clade: Tracheophytes
- Clade: Angiosperms
- Clade: Eudicots
- Clade: Asterids
- Order: Asterales
- Family: Campanulaceae
- Genus: Campanula
- Species: C. sulphurea

Binomial name
- Campanula sulphurea Boiss. (1849)

= Campanula sulphurea =

Species of plant

Campanula sulphurea, common name yellow bellflower, is a flowering plant in the genus Campanula. The native range of this species is Southwest Syria to Northeast Egypt. It is an annual and grows primarily in the subtropical biome. The flowers are a pale straw colour on the outside with an interior colour a sulphur yellow. It is native to Egypt and the Sinai Peninsula, Lebanon-Syria, Palestine and Israel.
