= Lotus gebelia =

Scientific classification
- Kingdom: Plantae
- Clade: Tracheophytes
- Clade: Angiosperms
- Clade: Eudicots
- Clade: Rosids
- Order: Fabales
- Family: Fabaceae
- Subfamily: Faboideae
- Genus: Lotus
- Species: L. gebelia

Binomial name
- Lotus gebelia Vent.

Species of plant

Lotus gebelia or the Lyadvenetz Gebeli is a plant in the genus Lotus ranging from the E. Medit. to Iran.

== Description ==
This species is identified by its pink pea like flowers. It is a perennial growing up to 10 – 15 cm. the leaves are compound. the stem surfaces are hairless or villous. It also has smallish leaflets.
