= Allium chloranthum =

Scientific classification
- Kingdom: Plantae
- Clade: Tracheophytes
- Clade: Angiosperms
- Clade: Monocots
- Order: Asparagales
- Family: Amaryllidaceae
- Subfamily: Allioideae
- Genus: Allium
- Subgenus: A. subg. Allium
- Species: A. chloranthum

Binomial name
- Allium chloranthum Boiss. 1854 not Schur 1866 nor Avé-Lall. ex Regel 1875

Species of flowering plant

Allium chloranthum is a species of onion native to Lebanon and southern Turkey.
