= List of native plants of Flora Palaestina (P–Z) =

This is an incomplete list of 2,700 species of vascular plants which are native to the Israel as defined by Flora Palaestina. Flora Palaestina is a work in four volumes published by Brill Academic Publishers between 1966 and 1986, edited by Michael Zohary and Naomi Feinbrun-Dothan. The region covered includes: the whole area of the State of Israel; the West Bank; the Gaza Strip; the Golan Heights; the Israeli part of Mount Hermon; and the East Bank.

The table below lists alphabetically all species with initial letters P–Z. For other species and some background information, click here:

- A–B
- C–D
- E–O

	Binomial name	Family	Hebrew name	English name	Arabic name	Notes	Image
1762	Paeonia mascula	Paeoniaceae	אדמונית החורש				
1763	Paliurus spina-christi	Rhamnaceae	שמיר קוצני				
1764	Pallenis spinosa	Asteraceae	מוצית קוצנית				
1765	Pancratium maritimum	Amaryllidaceae	חבצלת החוף				
1766	Pancratium parviflorum	Amaryllidaceae	חבצלת קטנת-פרחים				
1767	Pancratium sickenbergeri	Amaryllidaceae	חבצלת הנגב				
1768	Panicum coloratum	Poaceae	דוחן מכחיל				
1769	Panicum maximum	Poaceae	דוחן קיפח	Guinea grass			
1770	Panicum repens	Poaceae	דוחן זוחל				
1771	Panicum turgidum	Poaceae	דוחן אשון				
1772	Papaver argemone	Papaveraceae	פרג מוארך				
1773	Papaver carmeli	Papaveraceae	פרג הכרמל				
1774	Papaver decaisnei	Papaveraceae	פרג סיני				
1775	Papaver humile	Papaveraceae	פרג נחות				
1776	Papaver hybridum	Papaveraceae	פרג זיפני				
1777	Papaver polytrichum	Papaveraceae	פרג סמור				
1778	Papaver syriacum	Papaveraceae	פרג סורי				
1779	Papaver umbonatum	Papaveraceae	פרג אגסי				
1780	Paracaryum lamprocarpum	Boraginaceae	הילל מבריק				
1781	Paracaryum lithospermifolium	Boraginaceae	הילל חרמוני				
1782	Paracaryum rugulosum	Boraginaceae	הילל מקומט				
1783	Parapholis filiformis	Poaceae	דק-זנב נימי				
1784	Parapholis incurva	Poaceae	דק-זנב קשתני				
1785	Parapholis marginata	Poaceae	דק-זנב מכונף				
1786	Parentucellia latifolia	Scrophulariaceae	עלקלוק צהוב-פרחים				
1787	Parentucellia viscosa	Scrophulariaceae	עלקלוק דביק				
1788	Parietaria alsinifolia	Urticaceae	כתלית זעירה				
1789	Parietaria judaica	Urticaceae	כתלית יהודה				
1790	Parietaria lusitanica	Urticaceae	כתלית פורטוגלית				
1791	Paronychia arabica	Caryophyllaceae	אלמוות ערבי				
1792	Paronychia argentea	Caryophyllaceae	אלמוות הכסף				
1793	Paronychia capitata	Caryophyllaceae	אלמוות הקרקפות				
1794	Paronychia echinulata	Caryophyllaceae	אלמוות שיכני				
1795	Paronychia jordanica	Caryophyllaceae	אלמוות ירדני				
1796	Paronychia macrosepala	Caryophyllaceae	אלמוות גדול-גביע				
1797	Paronychia palaestina	Caryophyllaceae	אלמוות ארץ-ישראלי				
1798	Paronychia sinaica	Caryophyllaceae	אלמוות סיני				
1799	Paspalidium geminatum	Poaceae	פספלת התאומים				
1800	Peganum harmala	Zygophyllaceae	שבר לבן				
1801	Peltaria angustifolia	Brassicaceae	שלטה צרת-עלים				
1802	Pennisetum ciliare	Poaceae	זיף-נוצה ריסני		ثيوم هدبي		
1803	Pennisetum clandestinum	Poaceae	זיף-נוצה חבוי		ثيوم خفي		
1804	Pennisetum divisum	Poaceae	זיף-נוצה מדוקרן		ثيوم سبط		
1805	Pennisetum orientale	Poaceae	זיף-נוצה מחוספס		ثيوم شرقي		
1806	Pentatropis nivalis	Asclepiadaceae	מחומש לוליני				
1807	Pergularia tomentosa	Asclepiadaceae	דמיה לבידה				
1808	Periploca aphylla	Asclepiadaceae	חלביב רותמי				
1809	Periploca graeca	Asclepiadaceae	חלביב יווני				
1810	Persicaria acuminata	Polygonaceae	ארכובית מחודדת				
1811	Persicaria decipiens	Polygonaceae	ארכובית משונשנת				
1812	Persicaria lanigera	Polygonaceae	ארכובית צמירה				
1813	Persicaria lapathifolia	Polygonaceae	ארכובית הכתמים				
1814	Persicaria senegalensis	Polygonaceae	ארכובית סנגלית				
1815	Petrorhagia arabica	Caryophyllaceae	חלוק ערבי				
1816	Petrorhagia dubia	Caryophyllaceae	חלוק שעיר				
1817	Petrorhagia zoharyana	Caryophyllaceae	חלוק זהרי				
1818	Peucedanum depauperatum	Apiaceae	אחישבת מדולדל				
1819	Peucedanum junceum	Apiaceae	אחישבת ענף				
1820	Phagnalon barbeyanum	Asteraceae	צמרנית אדומית				
1821	Phagnalon rupestre	Asteraceae	צמרנית הסלעים				
1822	Phalaris aquatica	Poaceae	חפורית הפקעים				
1823	Phalaris brachystachys	Poaceae	חפורית מצויה				
1824	Phalaris canariensis	Poaceae	חפורית קנרית				
1825	Phalaris minor	Poaceae	חפורית קטנה				
1826	Phalaris paradoxa	Poaceae	חפורית מוזרה				
1827	Phillyrea latifolia	Oleaceae	בר-זית בינוני				
1828	Phleum exaratum	Poaceae	איטן החולות				
1829	Phleum montanum	Poaceae	איטן ההרים				
1830	Phleum subulatum	Poaceae	איטן מרצעני				
1831	Phlomis brachyodon	Lamiaceae	שלהבית קצרת-שיניים				
1832	Phlomis brachyodon x pungens	Lamiaceae	שלהבית הכלאיים				
1833	Phlomis brevilabris	Lamiaceae	שלהבית הררית				
1834	Phlomis chrysophylla	Lamiaceae	שלהבית צהובת-עלים				
1835	Phlomis kurdica	Lamiaceae	שלהבית כורדית				
1836	Phlomis platystegia	Lamiaceae	שלהבית המדבר				
1837	Phlomis pungens	Lamiaceae	שלהבית הגלגל				
1838	Phlomis rigida	Lamiaceae	שלהבית אשונה				
1839	Phlomis syriaca	Lamiaceae	שלהבית סורית				
1840	Phlomis viscosa	Lamiaceae	שלהבית דביקה				
1841	Phoenix dactylifera	Palmae	תמר מצוי				
1842	Phragmites australis	Poaceae	קנה מצוי				
1843	Phragmites frutescens	Poaceae	קנה קוצני				
1844	Phyla nodiflora	Verbenaceae	ליפיה זוחלת				
1845	Phyllanthus rotundifolius	Euphorbiaceae	פילנתוס עגול-עלים				
1846	Physalis peruviana	Solanaceae	בוען נאכל				
1847	Physocaulis nodosus	Apiaceae	מפריק נפוח				
1848	Picnomon acarna	Asteraceae	בן-קוצן מאפיר				
1849	Picris altissima	Asteraceae	מררית מצויה				
1850	Picris amalecitana	Asteraceae	מררית החוף				
1851	Picris asplenioides	Asteraceae	מררית שסועה				
1852	Picris babylonica	Asteraceae	מררית בבלית				
1853	Picris cyanocarpa	Asteraceae	מררית כחולת-זרעון				
1854	Picris galilaea	Asteraceae	מררית הגליל				
1855	Picris longirostris	Asteraceae	מררית דמשקאית				
1856	Picris strigosa	Asteraceae	מררית סמורה				
1857	Pilgerochloa blanchei	Poaceae	בשנית עדינה				
1858	Pimpinella corymbosa	Apiaceae	כמנון ענף				
1859	Pimpinella cretica	Apiaceae	כמנון כרתי				
1860	Pimpinella eriocarpa	Apiaceae	כמנון שעיר				
1861	Pimpinella peregrina	Apiaceae	כמנון קיפח				
1862	Pinus halepensis	Pinaceae	אורן ירושלים				
1863	Piptatherum blancheanum	Poaceae	נשרן מכחיל				
1864	Piptatherum holciforme	Poaceae	נשרן שעיר				
1865	Piptatherum miliaceum	Poaceae	נשרן הדוחן				
1866	Piptatherum thomasii	Poaceae	נשרן צפוף				
1867	Pistacia atlantica	Anacardiaceae	אלה אטלנטית				
1868	Pistacia lentiscus	Anacardiaceae	אלת המסטיק				
1870	Pistacia saportae	Anacardiaceae	אלת הכלאיים				
1869	Pistacia terebinthus	Anacardiaceae	אלה ארץ-ישראלית				
1871	Pisum elatius	Papilionaceae	אפון קיפח				
1872	Pisum fulvum	Papilionaceae	אפון מצוי				
1873	Pisum sativum	Papilionaceae	אפון נמוך				
1874	Plantago afra	Plantaginaceae	לחך בלוטי				
1875	Plantago albicans	Plantaginaceae	לחך מלבין				
1876	Plantago amplexicaulis	Plantaginaceae	לחך לופת				
1877	Plantago arenaria	Plantaginaceae	לחך הודי				
1878	Plantago bellardii	Plantaginaceae	לחך פעוט				
1879	Plantago chamaepsyllium	Plantaginaceae	לחך הנגב				
1880	Plantago ciliata	Plantaginaceae	לחך ריסני				
1881	Plantago coronopus	Plantaginaceae	לחך שסוע				
1882	Plantago crassifolia	Plantaginaceae	לחך המלחות				
1883	Plantago cretica	Plantaginaceae	לחך כרתי				
1884	Plantago cylindrica	Plantaginaceae	לחך גלילני				
1885	Plantago lagopus	Plantaginaceae	לחך מצוי				
1886	Plantago lanceolata	Plantaginaceae	לחך אזמלני				
1887	Plantago major	Plantaginaceae	לחך גדול				
1888	Plantago maris-mortui	Plantaginaceae	לחך ים-המלח				
1889	Plantago notata	Plantaginaceae	לחך משונן				
1890	Plantago ovata	Plantaginaceae	לחך סגלגל				
1891	Plantago phaeostoma	Plantaginaceae	לחך חום-לוע				
1892	Plantago sarcophylla	Plantaginaceae	לחך בשרני				
1893	Plantago squarrosa	Plantaginaceae	לחך החוף				
1894	Platanthera holmboei	Orchidaceae	מרונית סרגלית				
1895	Platanus orientalis	Platanaceae	דולב מזרחי				
1896	Plicosepalus acaciae	Loranthaceae	הרנוג השיטים				
1897	Pluchea dioscoridis	Asteraceae	פלגית שיחנית				
1898	Plumbago europaea	Plumbaginaceae	עפרית אירופית				
1899	Poa annua	Poaceae	סיסנית חד-שנתית		قبأ حولي		
1900	Poa bulbosa	Poaceae	סיסנית הבולבוסין		قبأ بصلي		
1901	Poa diversifolia	Poaceae	סיסנית שונת-עלים		قبأ متعدد الأوراق		
1902	Poa eigii	Poaceae	סיסנית איג				
1903	Poa infirma	Poaceae	סיסנית הגינות				
1904	Poa nemoralis	Poaceae	סיסנית היערות		قبأ الغابات		
1905	Poa pratensis	Poaceae	סיסנית האחו		قبأ المروج		
1906	Poa sinaica	Poaceae	סיסנית סיני		قبأ سيناء		
1907	Poa trivialis	Poaceae	סיסנית הביצות		قبأ خشن		
1908	Podonosma orientalis	Boraginaceae	מציץ סורי				
1909	Polycarpaea repens	Caryophyllaceae	פריינית שרועה				
1910	Polycarpaea robbairea	Caryophyllaceae	פריינית קירחת				
1911	Polycarpon succulentum	Caryophyllaceae	רב-פרי בשרני				
1912	Polycarpon tetraphyllum	Caryophyllaceae	רב-פרי מצוי				
1913	Polygala hohenackeriana	Polygalaceae	מרבה-חלב אדומי				
1914	Polygala monspeliaca	Polygalaceae	מרבה-חלב מונפלייני				
1915	Polygala negevensis	Polygalaceae	מרבה-חלב נגבי				
1916	Polygonum arenarium	Polygonaceae	ארכובית ורודה				
1917	Polygonum arenastrum	Polygonaceae	ארכובית הציפורים				
1918	Polygonum argyrocoleum	Polygonaceae	ארכובית צפופה				
1919	Polygonum aviculare	Polygonaceae	ארכובית צרת-עלים				
1920	Polygonum bellardii	Polygonaceae	ארכובית חד-שנתית				
1921	Polygonum cedrorum	Polygonaceae	ארכובית הארזים				
1922	Polygonum cognatum	Polygonaceae	ארכובית חרמונית				
1923	Polygonum equisetiforme	Polygonaceae	ארכובית שבטבטית				
1924	Polygonum libani	Polygonaceae	ארכובית לבנונית				
1925	Polygonum maritimum	Polygonaceae	ארכובית החוף				
1926	Polygonum palaestinum	Polygonaceae	ארכובית ארץ-ישראלית				
1927	Polygonum polycnemoides	Polygonaceae	ארכובית הררית				
1928	Polygonum setosum	Polygonaceae	ארכובית זיפנית				
1929	Polypodium cambricum	Polypodiaceae	רב-רגל פשוט				
1930	Polypogon maritimus	Poaceae	עבדקן החוף				
1931	Polypogon monspeliensis	Poaceae	עבדקן מצוי				
1932	Polypogon viridis	Poaceae	עבדקן הדורים				
1933	Populus euphratica	Salicaceae	צפצפת הפרת		حور فراتي		
1934	Portulaca oleracea	Portulacaceae	רגלת הגינה		بقلة زيتية		
1935	Potamogeton berchtoldii	Potamogetonaceae	נהרונית קרומית				
1936	Potamogeton crispus	Potamogetonaceae	נהרונית מסולסלת				
1937	Potamogeton filiformis	Potamogetonaceae	נהרונית חוטית				
1938	Potamogeton lucens	Potamogetonaceae	נהרונית שקופה				
1939	Potamogeton nodosus	Potamogetonaceae	נהרונית צפה				
1940	Potamogeton pectinatus	Potamogetonaceae	נהרונית מסרקנית				
1941	Potamogeton perfoliatus	Potamogetonaceae	נהרונית לופתת				
1942	Potamogeton trichoides	Potamogetonaceae	נהרונית נימית				
1943	Potentilla geranioides	Rosaceae	חמשן נדיר				
1944	Potentilla reptans	Rosaceae	חמשן זוחל				
1945	Potentilla supina	Rosaceae	חמשן קטן				
1946	Prangos ferulacea	Apiaceae	שעמון מצולע				
1947	Prasium majus	Lamiaceae	פרסיון גדול				
1948	Prosopis farcta	Mimosaceae	ינבוט השדה				
1949	Prunus ursina	Rosaceae	שזיף הדוב		خوخ الدب		
1950	Pseuderucaria clavata	Brassicaceae	שלחלח האלה				
1951	Pseudognaphlium luteo-album	Asteraceae	לבדנית צהבהבת				
1952	Pseudorlaya pumila	Apiaceae	גזרנית החוף				
1953	Psilurus incurvus synonym of Festuca incurva	Poaceae	נימית ממולענת				
1954	Psylliostachys spicata	Plumbaginaceae	עדעדית משובלת				
1955	Pteranthus dichotomus	Caryophyllaceae	כנפן קוצני				
1956	Pteridium aquilinum	Hypolepidaceae	אברנית הנשר				
1957	Pteris vittata	Pteridaceae	אברה ארוכת-עלים				
1958	Pterocephalus brevis	Dipsacaceae	נוציץ עטוף				
1959	Pterocephalus plumosus	Dipsacaceae	נוציץ מנוצה				
1960	Pterocephalus pulverulentus	Dipsacaceae	נוציץ המדבר				
1961	Plocama calycoptera	Rubiaceae	מכנפיים מדבריים				
1962	Ptilostemon chamaepeuce	Asteraceae	ארנין ההרים				
1963	Ptilostemon diacantha	Asteraceae	ארנין קוצני				
1964	Puccinellia distans	Poaceae	בן-בצת מרוחק				
1965	Pulicaria arabica	Asteraceae	פרעושית ערבית				
1966	Pulicaria auranitica	Asteraceae	פרעושית החורן				
1967	Pulicaria dysenterica	Asteraceae	פרעושית משלשלת				
1968	Pulicaria incisa	Asteraceae	פרעושית גלונית				
1969	Pulicaria inuloides	Asteraceae	פרעושית טיונית				
1970	Pulicaria sicula	Asteraceae	פרעושית סיצילית				
1971	Pulicaria undulata	Asteraceae	פרעושית מסולסלת				
1972	Pulicaria vulgaris	Asteraceae	פרעושית פשוטה				
1973	Plocama calabrica	Rubiaceae	פואנית איטלקית				
1974	Pycnocycla saxatilis	Apiaceae	עבדור הסלעים				
1975	Pyrus syriaca	Rosaceae	אגס סורי		أجاص سوري		
1976	Quercus boissieri	Fagaceae	אלון התולע				
1977	Quercus calliprinos	Fagaceae	אלון מצוי		بلوط قلبريني		
1978	Quercus cerris	Fagaceae	אלון שסוע		سنديان أشعر		
1979	Quercus ithaburensis	Fagaceae	אלון התבור		سنديان طبراني		
1980	Quercus libani	Fagaceae	אלון הלבנון		سنديان لبناني		
1981	Quercus look	Fagaceae	אלון חרמוני				
1982	Quidproquo confusum	Brassicaceae	צנון משתלשל				
1983	Ranunculus arvensis	Ranunculaceae	נורית השדה		حوذان بستاني		
1984	Ranunculus asiaticus	Ranunculaceae	נורית אסיה		حوذان آسيوي		
1985	Ranunculus chius	Ranunculaceae	נורית קטנה				
1986	Ranunculus constantinopolitanus	Ranunculaceae	נורית קושטא		حوذان اسطنبولي		
1987	Ranunculus cornutus	Ranunculaceae	נורית הקרן		حوذان قرني		
1988	Ranunculus damascenus	Ranunculaceae	נורית דמשקאית		حوذان دمشقي		
1989	Ranunculus demissus	Ranunculaceae	נורית השלג		حوذان منخفض		
1990	Ranunculus ficaria	Ranunculaceae	נורית הלב		حوذان تيني		
1991	Ranunculus ficarioides	Ranunculaceae	נורית חרוקה				
1992	Ranunculus lateriflorus	Ranunculaceae	נורית חיקית		حوذان طرفي الأزهار		
1993	Ranunculus millefolius	Ranunculaceae	נורית ירושלים	Jerusalem buttercup	حوذان ألفي الأوراق	known as "nurit" in Israel	
1994	Ranunculus muricatus	Ranunculaceae	נורית הזיזים		حوذان أرجواني		
1995	Ranunculus myosuroides	Ranunculaceae	נורית זנובה				
1996	Ranunculus neocuneatus	Ranunculaceae	נורית יתדית				
1997	Ranunculus ophioglossifolius	Ranunculaceae	נורית הביצות				
1998	Ranunculus paludosus	Ranunculaceae	נורית מניפנית				
1999	Ranunculus peltatus	Ranunculaceae	נורית המים		حوذان هلالي		
2000	Ranunculus pinardii	Ranunculaceae	נורית סלילנית				
2001	Ranunculus saniculifolius	Ranunculaceae	נורית עגולת-עלים				
2002	Ranunculus scandicinus	Ranunculaceae	נורית המלל				
2003	Ranunculus sceleratus	Ranunculaceae	נורית ארסית				
2004	Ranunculus sphaerospermus	Ranunculaceae	נורית כדורית				
2005	Ranunculus trichophyllus	Ranunculaceae	נורית נימית				
2006	Raphanus raphanistrum	Brassicaceae	צנון מצוי				
2007	Raphanus rostratus	Brassicaceae	צנון פגיוני		فجل منقاري		
2008	Rapistrum rugosum	Brassicaceae	בקבוקון מקומט				
2009	Reaumuria hirtella	Tamaricaceae	אשליל שעיר				
2010	Reaumuria negevensis	Tamaricaceae	אשליל הנגב				
2011	Reichardia intermedia	Asteraceae	תמריר בינוני				
2012	Reichardia tingitana	Asteraceae	תמריר מרוקני				
2013	Reseda alba	Resedaceae	רכפה לבנה				
2014	Reseda alopecuros	Resedaceae	רכפה גדולה				
2015	Reseda arabica	Resedaceae	רכפה ערבית				
2016	Reseda boissieri	Resedaceae	רכפת בואסיה				
2017	Reseda decursiva	Resedaceae	רכפה קטנת-פרחים				
2018	Reseda globulosa	Resedaceae	רכפה כרסתנית				
2019	Reseda lutea	Resedaceae	רכפה צהובה				
2020	Reseda luteola	Resedaceae	רכפת הצבעים				
2021	Reseda muricata	Resedaceae	רכפה מגובששת				
2022	Reseda orientalis	Resedaceae	רכפה מזרחית				
2023	Reseda stenostachya	Resedaceae	רכפה דקת-שיבולת				
2024	Reseda urnigera	Resedaceae	רכפת ים-המלח				
2025	Retama raetam	Papilionaceae	רותם המדבר				
2026	Rhagadiolus edulis	Asteraceae	כוכבן נאכל				
2027	Rhagadiolus stellatus	Asteraceae	כוכבן מצוי				
2028	Rhamnus alaternus	Rhamnaceae	אשחר רחב-עלים				
2029	Rhamnus disperma	Rhamnaceae	אשחר דו-זרעי				
2030	Rhamnus libanotica	Rhamnaceae	אשחר הלבנון				
2031	Rhamnus lycioides	Rhamnaceae	אשחר ארץ-ישראלי				
2032	Rhamnus punctata	Rhamnaceae	אשחר מנוקד				
2033	Rheum palaestinum	Polygonaceae	ריבס המדבר				
2034	Rheum ribes	Polygonaceae	ריבס אמתי				
2035	Rhizocephalus orientalis	Poaceae	גמדונית מזרחית				
2036	Rhus coriaria	Anacardiaceae	אוג הבורסקאים				
2037	Rhus pentaphylla	Anacardiaceae	אוג מחומש				
2038	Rhus tripartita	Anacardiaceae	אוג קוצני				
2039	Rhynchosia minima	Papilionaceae	חרטום זעיר				
2040	Ricotia lunaria	Brassicaceae	כרמלית נאה				
2041	Ridolfia segetum	Apiaceae	נירית הקמה				
2042	Rochelia disperma	Boraginaceae	רושליה דו-זרעית				
2043	Roemeria hybrida	Papaveraceae	בן-פרג סגול				
2044	Roemeria procumbens	Papaveraceae	בן-פרג שרוע				
2045	Romulea bulbocodium	Iridaceae	רומולאה סגלולית				
2046	Romulea columnae	Iridaceae	רומולאה זעירה				
2047	Romulea nivalis	Iridaceae	רומולאת השלג				
2048	Romulea petraea	Iridaceae	רומולאה אדומית				
2049	Romulea phoenicia	Iridaceae	רומולאה צידונית				
2050	Rorippa amphibia	Brassicaceae	רוריפה טובענית				
2051	Rosa canina	Rosaceae	ורד הכלב				
2052	Rosa phoenicia	Rosaceae	ורד צידוני				
2053	Rosa pulverulenta	Rosaceae	ורד דביק				
2054	Rostraria cristata	Poaceae	דגנין מצוי				
2055	Rostraria obtusiflora	Poaceae	דגנין קהה				
2056	Rostraria pumila	Poaceae	דגנין גמוד				
2057	Rostraria smyrnacea	Poaceae	דגנין בירותי				
2058	Rosularia libanotica	Crassulaceae	שושנתית הלבנון				
2059	Rosularia lineata	Crassulaceae	שושנתית מסורטטת				
2060	Rubia danaensis	Rubiaceae	פואת דנא				
2061	Rubia tenuifolia	Rubiaceae	פואה מצויה				
2062	Rubia tinctorum	Rubiaceae	פואת הצבעים				
2063	Rubus canescens	Rosaceae	פטל לביד				
2064	Rubus sanguineus	Rosaceae	פטל קדוש				
2065	Rumex bucephalophorus	Polygonaceae	חומעת ראש-הסוס				
2066	Rumex cassius	Polygonaceae	חומעת החורש				
2067	Rumex conglomeratus	Polygonaceae	חומעה מגובבת				
2068	Rumex crispus	Polygonaceae	חומעה מסולסלת				
2069	Rumex cyprius	Polygonaceae	חומעה ורודה				
2070	Rumex dentatus	Polygonaceae	חומעה משוננת				
2071	Rumex maritimus	Polygonaceae	חומעת החוף				
2072	Rumex nepalensis	Polygonaceae	חומעה נפלית				
2073	Rumex occultans	Polygonaceae	חומעה עטויה				
2074	Rumex pictus	Polygonaceae	חומעה מגוידת				
2075	Rumex pulcher	Polygonaceae	חומעה יפה				
2076	Rumex roseus	Polygonaceae	חומעה מרוקנית				
2077	Rumex rothschildianus	Polygonaceae	חומעת האווירון				
2078	Rumex tuberosus	Polygonaceae	חומעת הפקעת				
2079	Rumex vesicarius	Polygonaceae	חומעה משולחפת				
2080	Ruppia cirrhosa	Ruppiaceae	רופיה לוליינית				
2081	Ruppia maritima	Ruppiaceae	רופיית הים				
2082	Ruscus aculeatus	Liliaceae	עצבונית החורש				
2083	Ruta chalepensis	Rutaceae	פיגם מצוי				
2084	Saccharum ravennae	Poaceae	קנה-סוכר גבוה				
2085	Saccharum spontaneum	Poaceae	קנה-סוכר מצרי				
2086	Saccharum strictum	Poaceae	קנה-סוכר זקוף				
2087	Sageretia thea	Rhamnaceae	אשחרית המדבר				
2088	Sagina apetala	Caryophyllaceae	סגינה זעירה				
2089	Sagina maritima	Caryophyllaceae	סגינה חופית				
2090	Salicornia europaea	Chenopodiaceae	פרקן עשבוני				
2091	Salix acmophylla	Salicaceae	ערבה מחודדת				
2092	Salix alba	Salicaceae	ערבה לבנה				
2093	Salix pseudosafsaf	Salicaceae	ערבה מדומה				
2094	Salix triandra	Salicaceae	ערבת שלושת-האבקנים				
2095	Salsola boissieri	Chenopodiaceae	מלחית מאפירה				
2096	Salsola cyclophylla	Chenopodiaceae	מלחית מסורגת		روثا دائرية الأوراق		
2097	Salsola gaetula	Chenopodiaceae	מלחית הערבה				
2098	Salsola imbricata	Chenopodiaceae	מלחית מבאישה				
2099	Salsola incanescens	Chenopodiaceae	מלחית עדינה				
2100	Salsola inermis	Chenopodiaceae	מלחית חומה		روثا غير مسننة		
2101	Salsola jordanicola	Chenopodiaceae	מלחית הירדן		روثا أردنية		
2102	Salsola oppositifolia	Chenopodiaceae	מלחית נגדית		روثا متقابلة الأوراق		
2103	Salsola orientalis	Chenopodiaceae	מלחית מזרחית		روثا مشرقية		
2104	Salsola schweinfurthii	Chenopodiaceae	מלחית הישימון				
2105	Salsola soda	Chenopodiaceae	מלחית הבורית				
2106	Salsola tetrandra	Chenopodiaceae	מלחית קשקשית		روثا رباعية الأسدية		
2107	Salsola tragus	Chenopodiaceae	מלחית אשלגנית				
2108	Salsola vermiculata	Chenopodiaceae	מלחית אשונה		روثا دودية		
2109	Salvadora persica	Salvadoraceae	סלוודורה פרסית				
2110	Salvia aegyptiaca	Lamiaceae	מרווה מצרית		مريمية مصرية		
2111	Salvia bracteata	Lamiaceae	מרוות החפים				
2112	Salvia ceratophylla	Lamiaceae	מרווה שסועה				
2113	Salvia deserti	Lamiaceae	מרוות המדבר		مريمية صحراوية		
2114	Salvia dominica	Lamiaceae	מרווה ריחנית				
2115	Salvia eigii	Lamiaceae	מרוות איג				
2116	Salvia fruticosa	Lamiaceae	מרווה משולשת		مريمية شجيرية		
2117	Salvia hierosolymitana	Lamiaceae	מרוות ירושלים				
2118	Salvia indica	Lamiaceae	מרווה כחולה		مريمية هندية		
2119	Salvia judaica	Lamiaceae	מרוות יהודה		مريمية خليلية		
2120	Salvia lanigera	Lamiaceae	מרווה צמירה				
2121	Salvia microstegia	Lamiaceae	מרווה בוצינית				
2122	Salvia multicaulis	Lamiaceae	מרווה רחבת-גביע				
2123	Salvia palaestina	Lamiaceae	מרווה ארץ-ישראלית		مريمية فلسطينية		
2124	Salvia pinardii	Lamiaceae	מרוות פינר				
2125	Salvia pinnata	Lamiaceae	מרווה מנוצה		مريمية ريشية		
2126	Salvia rubifolia	Lamiaceae	מרוות הפטל				
2127	Salvia samuelssonii	Lamiaceae	מרווה מלבינה				
2128	Salvia sclarea	Lamiaceae	מרווה מרושתת				
2129	Salvia spinosa	Lamiaceae	מרווה קוצנית		مريمية شائكة		
2130	Salvia syriaca	Lamiaceae	מרווה סורית		مريمية سورية		
2131	Salvia verbenaca	Lamiaceae	מרווה מצויה				
2132	Salvia viridis	Lamiaceae	מרווה דגולה		مريمية خضراء		
2133	Salvia viscosa	Lamiaceae	מרווה דביקה				
2134	Sambucus ebulus	Caprifoliaceae	סמבוק אמיתי				
2135	Samolus valerandi	Primulaceae	ערידת הביצות				
2136	Sanguisorba minor	Rosaceae	בן-סירה מיובל				
2137	Saponaria mesogitana	Caryophyllaceae	בורית אדומה				
2138	Saponaria pumilio	Caryophyllaceae	בורית מאובקת				
2139	Sarcocornia fruticosa (now Salicornia fruticosa)	Chenopodiaceae	שרשר שיחני				
2140	Sarcocornia perennis (now Salicornia perennis)	Chenopodiaceae	שרשר רב-שנתי				
2141	Sarcopoterium spinosum	Rosaceae	סירה קוצנית				
2142	Satureja nabateorum	Lamiaceae	צתרה נבטית				
2143	Satureja thymbra	Lamiaceae	צתרה ורודה				
2144	Satureja thymbrifolia	Lamiaceae	צתרה מדברית				
2145	Savignya parviflora	Brassicaceae	סוויניה עדינה				
2146	Saxifraga hederacea	Saxifragaceae	בקעצור החורש				
2147	Saxifraga tridactylites	Saxifragaceae	בקעצור שלוש-האונות				
2148	Scaligeria hermonis	Apiaceae	סקליגריה חרמונית				
2149	Scaligeria napiformis	Apiaceae	סקליגריה כרתית				
2150	Scandix australis	Apiaceae	מסרק דרומי				
2151	Scandix falcata	Apiaceae	מסרק מגלני				
2152	Scandix grandiflora	Apiaceae	מסרק גדול-פרח				
2153	Scandix palaestina	Apiaceae	מסרק ארץ-ישראלי				
2154	Scandix pecten-veneris	Apiaceae	מסרק שולמית				
2155	Scandix stellata	Apiaceae	מסרק כוכבי				
2156	Scandix verna	Apiaceae	מסרק מזרחי				
2157	Schedonorus arundinaceus	Poaceae	בן-אפר מצוי				
2158	Schimpera arabica	Brassicaceae	חרטומית ערבית				
2159	Schismus arabicus	Poaceae	שסיע ערבי				
2160	Schismus barbatus	Poaceae	שסיע שעיר				
2161	Schoenefeldia gracilis	Poaceae	שנפלדיה עדינה				
2162	Schoenus nigricans	Cyperaceae	אחיגומא משחיר				
2163	Scilla autumnalis	Liliaceae	בן-חצב סתווני				
2164	Scilla cilicica	Liliaceae	בן-חצב החורש				
2165	Scilla hanburyi	Liliaceae	בן-חצב מדברי				
2166	Scilla hyacinthoides	Liliaceae	בן-חצב יקינתוני				
2167	Scirpus cernuus	Cyperaceae	אגמון נטוי				
2168	Scirpus holoschoenus	Cyperaceae	אגמון הכדורים				
2169	Scirpus lacustris	Cyperaceae	אגמון האגם				
2170	Scirpus litoralis	Cyperaceae	אגמון החוף				
2171	Scirpus maritimus	Cyperaceae	אגמון ימי				
2172	Scirpus supinus	Cyperaceae	אגמון שרוע				
2173	Scleranthus orientalis	Caryophyllaceae	נוקשן מזרחי				
2174	Sclerocephalus arabicus	Caryophyllaceae	רב-גולה ערבי				
2175	Sclerochloa dura	Poaceae	יקשן שרוע				
2176	Scolymus hispanicus	Asteraceae	חוח ספרדי				
2177	Scolymus maculatus	Asteraceae	חוח עקוד				
2178	Scorpiurus muricatus	Papilionaceae	זנב-עקרב שיכני				
2179	Scorzonera judaica	Asteraceae	הרדופנין יהודה				
2180	Scorzonera mollis	Asteraceae	הרדופנין רך				
2181	Scorzonera multiscapa	Asteraceae	הרדופנין צר-עלים				
2182	Scorzonera papposa	Asteraceae	הרדופנין הציצית				
2183	Scorzonera pusilla	Asteraceae	הרדופנין נמוך				
2184	Scorzonera rigida	Asteraceae	הרדופנין אשון				
2185	Scorzonera subintegra	Asteraceae	הרדופנין מנוצה				
2186	Scorzonera syriaca	Asteraceae	הרדופנין סורי				
2187	Scrophularia deserti	Scrophulariaceae	לוענית המדבר				
2188	Scrophularia hierochuntina	Scrophulariaceae	לוענית יריחו				
2189	Scrophularia hypericifolia	Scrophulariaceae	לוענית החולות				
2190	Scrophularia libanotica	Scrophulariaceae	לוענית הלבנון				
2191	Scrophularia macrophylla	Scrophulariaceae	לוענית גדולת-עלים				
2192	Scrophularia nusairiensis	Scrophulariaceae	לוענית נוצירית				
2193	Scrophularia peyronii	Scrophulariaceae	לוענית מפושקת				
2194	Scrophularia pinardii	Scrophulariaceae	לוענית פינר				
2195	Scrophularia rubricaulis	Scrophulariaceae	לוענית גדולה				
2196	Scrophularia umbrosa	Scrophulariaceae	לוענית הצל				
2197	Scrophularia xanthoglossa	Scrophulariaceae	לוענית מצויה				
2198	Scrophularia xylorrhiza	Scrophulariaceae	לוענית הסלעים				
2199	Scutellaria brevibracteata	Lamiaceae	קערורית סגולה				
2200	Scutellaria galericulata	Lamiaceae	קערורית הביצה				
2201	Scutellaria tomentosa	Lamiaceae	קערורית שיחנית				
2202	Scutellaria utriculata	Lamiaceae	קערורית נאדית				
2203	Secale strictum	Poaceae	שיפון ההרים				
2204	Securigera cretica	Papilionaceae	כתרון כרתי				
2205	Securigera parviflora	Papilionaceae	כתרון זעיר-פרח				
2206	Securigera securidaca	Papilionaceae	קרדומית השדה				
2207	Sedum amplexicaule	Crassulaceae	צורית דקת-עלים				
2208	Sedum caespitosum	Crassulaceae	צורית אדומה				
2209	Sedum hispanicum	Crassulaceae	צורית ספרדית				
2210	Sedum laconicum	Crassulaceae	צורית יוונית				
2211	Sedum litoreum	Crassulaceae	צורית חופית				
2212	Sedum palaestinum	Crassulaceae	צורית ארץ-ישראלית				
2213	Sedum rubens	Crassulaceae	צורית בלוטית				
2214	Sedum sediforme	Crassulaceae	צורית גבוהה				
2215	Seetzenia lanata	Zygophyllaceae	זצניה מזרחית				
2216	Seidlitzia rosmarinus	Chenopodiaceae	שנהבית הרוזמרין				
2217	Senecio doriiformis	Asteraceae	סביון ההרים				
2218	Senecio flavus	Asteraceae	סביון צהוב				
2219	Senecio glaucus	Asteraceae	סביון הערבות				
2220	Senecio joppensis	Asteraceae	סביון יפו				
2221	Senecio vernalis	Asteraceae	סביון אביבי				
2222	Senecio vulgaris	Asteraceae	סביון פשוט				
2223	Senna alexandrina	Caesalpiniaceae	סנא מחודד				
2224	Senna italica	Caesalpiniaceae	סנא מדברי				
2225	Senna obtusifolia	Caesalpiniaceae	סנא קהה				
2226	Serapias levantina	Orchidaceae	שפתן מצוי				
2227	Serratula cerinthifolia	Asteraceae	קרקפן צהוב				
2228	Serratula pusilla	Asteraceae	קרקפן נמוך				
2229	Sesbania sesban	Papilionaceae	ססבניה מצרית				
2230	Setaria adhaerens	Poaceae	זיפן מצוי				
2231	Setaria pumila	Poaceae	זיפן כחלחל				
2232	Setaria verticillata	Poaceae	זיפן הדורים				
2233	Setaria viridis	Poaceae	זיפן ירוק				
2234	Sherardia arvensis	Rubiaceae	ששית מצויה				
2235	Sideritis libanotica	Lamiaceae	ברזילון הלבנון				
2236	Sideritis montana	Lamiaceae	ברזילון הררי				
2237	Sideritis perfoliata	Lamiaceae	ברזילון ריסני				
2238	Sideritis pullulans	Lamiaceae	ברזילון ענף				
2239	Sideritis remota	Lamiaceae	ברזילון מרחק				
2240	Siebera nana	Asteraceae	סיברה ננסית				
2241	Silene aegyptiaca	Caryophyllaceae	ציפרנית מצרית				
2242	Silene alexandrina	Caryophyllaceae	ציפרנית אלכסנדרונית				
2243	Silene arabica	Caryophyllaceae	ציפרנית ערבית				
2244	Silene behen	Caryophyllaceae	ציפרנית כרסנית				
2245	Silene colorata	Caryophyllaceae	ציפרנית מגוונת				
2246	Silene coniflora	Caryophyllaceae	ציפרנית מעורקת				
2247	Silene conoidea	Caryophyllaceae	ציפרנית מחורטת				
2248	Silene crassipes	Caryophyllaceae	ציפרנית עבת-עוקץ				
2249	Silene damascena	Caryophyllaceae	ציפרנית דמשקאית				
2250	Silene danaensis	Caryophyllaceae	ציפרנית דנא				
2251	Silene decipiens	Caryophyllaceae	ציפרנית מקופחת				
2252	Silene dichotoma	Caryophyllaceae	ציפרנית ענפה				
2253	Silene fuscata	Caryophyllaceae	ציפרנית שחומה				
2254	Silene gallica	Caryophyllaceae	ציפרנית צרפתית				
2255	Silene grisea	Caryophyllaceae	ציפרנית אפורה				
2256	Silene hussonii	Caryophyllaceae	ציפרנית הוסון				
2257	Silene italica	Caryophyllaceae	ציפרנית איטלקית				
2258	Silene libanotica	Caryophyllaceae	ציפרנית הלבנון				
2259	Silene linearis	Caryophyllaceae	ציפרנית דקיקה				
2260	Silene longipetala	Caryophyllaceae	ציפרנית מפושקת				
2261	Silene macrodonta	Caryophyllaceae	ציפרנית גדולת-שיניים				
2262	Silene modesta	Caryophyllaceae	ציפרנית חופית				
2263	Silene muscipula	Caryophyllaceae	ציפרנית דביקה				
2264	Silene nocturna	Caryophyllaceae	ציפרנית לילית				
2265	Silene odontopetala	Caryophyllaceae	ציפרנית שנונת-כותרת				
2266	Silene oxyodonta	Caryophyllaceae	ציפרנית חדת-שיניים				
2267	Silene palaestina	Caryophyllaceae	ציפרנית ארץ-ישראלית				
2268	Silene papillosa	Caryophyllaceae	ציפרנית שרונית				
2269	Silene physalodes	Caryophyllaceae	ציפרנית מצויצת				
2270	Silene reinwardtii	Caryophyllaceae	ציפרנית מצוירת				
2271	Silene rubella	Caryophyllaceae	ציפרנית אדמומית				
2272	Silene sedoides	Caryophyllaceae	ציפרנית זעירה				
2273	Silene stenobotrys	Caryophyllaceae	ציפרנית צרת-עלים				
2274	Silene succulenta	Caryophyllaceae	ציפרנית בשרנית				
2275	Silene swertiifolia	Caryophyllaceae	ציפרנית גדולה				
2276	Silene telavivensis	Caryophyllaceae	ציפרנית תל-אביבית				
2277	Silene tridentata	Caryophyllaceae	ציפרנית משוננת				
2278	Silene villosa	Caryophyllaceae	ציפרנית החולות				
2279	Silene vivianii	Caryophyllaceae	ציפרנית מדברית				
2280	Silene vulgaris	Caryophyllaceae	ציפרנית נפוחה				
2281	Silybum marianum	Asteraceae	גדילן מצוי				
2282	Sinapis alba	Brassicaceae	חרדל לבן				
2283	Sinapis arvensis	Brassicaceae	חרדל השדה				
2284	Sison exaltatum	Apiaceae	סיסון קיפח				
2285	Sisymbrium damascenum	Brassicaceae	תודרה דמשקאית				
2286	Sisymbrium erysimoides	Brassicaceae	תודרה מעובה				
2287	Sisymbrium irio	Brassicaceae	תודרה סייגית				
2288	Sisymbrium officinale	Brassicaceae	תודרה רפואית				
2289	Sisymbrium orientale	Brassicaceae	תודרה מזרחית				
2290	Sisymbrium runcinatum	Brassicaceae	תודרה מצויצת				
2291	Sisymbrium septulatum	Brassicaceae	תודרה נאה				
2292	Sixalix arenaria	Dipsacaceae	נזרית חופית				
2293	Sixalix eremophila	Dipsacaceae	נזרית מדברית				
2294	Smilax aspera	Liliaceae	קיסוסית קוצנית				
2295	Smyrniopsis syriaca	Apiaceae	נדד סורי				
2296	Smyrnium connatum	Apiaceae	מורית קלוטה				
2297	Smyrnium olusatrum	Apiaceae	מורית גדולה				
2298	Solanum dulcamara	Solanaceae	סולנום עדין				
2299	Solanum incanum	Solanaceae	סולנום החדק				
2300	Solanum nigrum	Solanaceae	סולנום שחור				
2301	Solanum sinaicum	Solanaceae	סולנום סיני				
2302	Solanum villosum	Solanaceae	סולנום שעיר				
2303	Solenanthus stamineus	Boraginaceae	סולננתה האבקנים				
2304	Solenostemma arghel	Asclepiadaceae	חרגל המדבר				
2305	Sonchus asper	Asteraceae	מרור מכחיל				
2306	Sonchus maritimus	Asteraceae	מרור ימי				
2307	Sonchus microcephalus	Asteraceae	מרור קטן-קרקפת				
2308	Sonchus oleraceus	Asteraceae	מרור הגינות				
2309	Sonchus suberosus	Asteraceae	מרור שנהבי				
2310	Sonchus tenerrimus	Asteraceae	מרור עדין				
2311	Sorbus torminalis	Rosaceae	בן-חוזרר הררי				
2312	Sorbus umbellata	Rosaceae	בן-חוזרר סוככי				
2313	Sorghum halepense	Poaceae	דורת ארם-צובא				
2314	Sparganium erectum	Sparganiaceae	כדורן ענף				
2315	Spartium junceum	Papilionaceae	אחירותם החורש				
2316	Spergula arvensis	Caryophyllaceae	דורית השדה				
2317	Spergula fallax	Caryophyllaceae	דורית רפה				
2318	Spergularia bocconei	Caryophyllaceae	אפזרית בוקון				
2319	Spergularia diandra	Caryophyllaceae	אפזרית דו-אבקנית				
2320	Spergularia maritima	Caryophyllaceae	אפזרית מלולה				
2321	Spergularia rubra	Caryophyllaceae	אפזרית אדומה				
2322	Spergularia salina	Caryophyllaceae	אפזרית מלוחה				
2323	Sphenopus divaricatus	Poaceae	יתדן מפושק				
2324	Spirodela polyrhiza	Lemnaceae	אגמית רבת-שורשים				
2325	Sporobolus indicus	Poaceae	מדחול הודי				
2326	Sporobolus pungens	Poaceae	מדחול דוקרני				
2327	Stachys aegyptiaca	Lamiaceae	אשבל מצרי				
2328	Stachys arabica	Lamiaceae	אשבל ערבי				
2329	Stachys arvensis	Lamiaceae	אשבל השדה				
2330	Stachys cretica	Lamiaceae	אשבל כרתי				
2331	Stachys distans	Lamiaceae	אשבל מופסק				
2332	Stachys ehrenbergii	Lamiaceae	אשבל הארזים				
2333	Stachys libanotica	Lamiaceae	אשבל הלבנון				
2334	Stachys longispicata	Lamiaceae	אשבל ארך-שיבולת				
2335	Stachys neurocalycina	Lamiaceae	אשבל מעורק				
2336	Stachys nivea	Lamiaceae	אשבל צחור				
2337	Stachys palaestina	Lamiaceae	אשבל ארץ-ישראלי				
2338	Stachys paneiana	Lamiaceae	אשבל נמרוד				
2339	Stachys spectabilis	Lamiaceae	אשבל נאה				
2340	Stachys viticina	Lamiaceae	אשבל הביצה				
2341	Stachys woronowii	Lamiaceae	אשבל ברזילוני				
2342	Stachys zoharyana	Lamiaceae	אשבל זהרי				
2343	Stellaria cupaniana	Caryophyllaceae	כוכבית גדולה				
2344	Stellaria media	Caryophyllaceae	כוכבית מצויה				
2345	Stellaria pallida	Caryophyllaceae	כוכבית חיוורת				
2346	Sternbergia clusiana	Amaryllidaceae	חלמונית גדולה				
2347	Sternbergia colchiciflora	Amaryllidaceae	חלמונית זעירה				
2348	Sternbergia lutea	Amaryllidaceae	חלמונית צהובה				
2349	Stipa arabica	Poaceae	מלעניאל הנוצות				
2350	Stipa bromoides	Poaceae	מלעניאל קצר-מלענים				
2351	Stipa capensis	Poaceae	מלעניאל מצוי				
2352	Stipa hohenackeriana	Poaceae	מלעניאל המזרח				
2353	Stipa holosericea	Poaceae	מלעניאל המשי				
2354	Stipa parviflora	Poaceae	מלעניאל קטן-פרחים				
2355	Stipa pellita	Poaceae	מלעניאל ארוך				
2356	Stipagrostis ciliata	Poaceae	מלענן ריסני				
2357	Stipagrostis drarii	Poaceae	מלענן דראר				
2358	Stipagrostis hirtigluma	Poaceae	מלענן שעיר-גלומה				
2359	Stipagrostis lanata	Poaceae	מלענן החוף				
2360	Stipagrostis obtusa	Poaceae	מלענן קהה				
2361	Stipagrostis plumosa	Poaceae	מלענן מנוצה				
2362	Stipagrostis raddiana	Poaceae	מלענן יפה-שער				
2363	Stipagrostis scoparia	Poaceae	מלענן המטאטאים				
2364	Styrax officinalis	Styracaceae	לבנה רפואי				
2365	Suaeda aegyptiaca	Chenopodiaceae	אוכם מצרי				
2366	Suaeda asphaltica	Chenopodiaceae	אוכם מדברי				
2367	Suaeda fruticosa	Chenopodiaceae	אוכם שיחני				
2368	Suaeda hortensis	Chenopodiaceae	אוכם הגינות				
2369	Suaeda monoica	Chenopodiaceae	אוכם חד-ביתי				
2370	Suaeda palaestina	Chenopodiaceae	אוכם ארץ-ישראלי				
2371	Suaeda splendens	Chenopodiaceae	אוכם חופי				
2372	Suaeda vera	Chenopodiaceae	אוכם אמיתי				
2373	Suaeda vermiculata	Chenopodiaceae	אוכם תולעני				
2374	Symphytum brachycalyx	Boraginaceae	סינפיטון ארץ-ישראלי				
2375	Syringodium isoetifolium	Cymodoceaceae	צינורית גלילנית				
2376	Taeniatherum caput-medusae	Poaceae	מלענת ארוכת-מלענים				
2377	Tamarix amplexicaulis	Tamaricaceae	אשל חובק				
2378	Tamarix aphylla	Tamaricaceae	אשל הפרקים				
2379	Tamarix aravensis	Tamaricaceae	אשל הערבה				
2380	Tamarix gennessarensis	Tamaricaceae	אשל הכינרת				
2381	Tamarix hampeana	Tamaricaceae	אשל עב-שיבולת				
2382	Tamarix jordanis	Tamaricaceae	אשל הירדן				
2383	Tamarix negevensis	Tamaricaceae	אשל הנגב				
2384	Tamarix nilotica	Tamaricaceae	אשל היאור				
2385	Tamarix palaestina	Tamaricaceae	אשל ארץ-ישראלי				
2386	Tamarix parviflora	Tamaricaceae	אשל קטן-פרחים				
2387	Tamarix passerinoides	Tamaricaceae	אשל מתנני				
2388	Tamarix tetragyna	Tamaricaceae	אשל מרובע				
2389	Tamus communis	Dioscoreaceae	טמוס מצוי				
2390	Tamus orientalis	Dioscoreaceae	טמוס מזרחי				
2391	Tanacetum aucheri	Asteraceae	בן-חרצית דק-עלה				
2392	Tanacetum densum	Asteraceae	בן-חרצית צפוף				
2393	Tanacetum sinaicum	Asteraceae	בן-חרצית גזור				
2394	Taraxacum cyprium	Asteraceae	שינן עב-שורש				
2395	Taraxacum syriacum	Asteraceae	שינן סורי				
2396	Teesdalia coronopifolia	Brassicaceae	טיסדליה שסועה				
2397	Telephium imperati	Caryophyllaceae	טלפיון חרמוני				
2398	Telephium sphaerospermum	Caryophyllaceae	טלפיון כדורי				
2399	Telmissa microcarpa	Crassulaceae	זערורית קטנת-פרי				
2400	Tephrosia apollinea	Papilionaceae	טפרוסיה נאה				
2401	Tephrosia nubica	Papilionaceae	טפרוסיה נובית				
2402	Tetradiclis tenella	Zygophyllaceae	אבי-ארבע מלוח				
2403	Tetragonolobus palaestinus	Papilionaceae	ארבע-כנפות מצויות				
2404	Tetragonolobus requienii	Papilionaceae	ארבע-כנפות צהובות				
2405	Tetrapogon villosus	Poaceae	ארבעוני שעיר				
2406	Teucrium capitatum	Lamiaceae	געדה מצויה				
2407	Teucrium creticum	Lamiaceae	געדה כרתית				
2408	Teucrium divaricatum	Lamiaceae	געדה מפושקת				
2409	Teucrium lamiifolium	Lamiaceae	געדת החורש				
2410	Teucrium leucocladum	Lamiaceae	געדה מלבינה				
2411	Teucrium montbretii	Lamiaceae	געדת הסלעים				
2412	Teucrium orientale	Lamiaceae	געדה מזרחית				
2413	Teucrium parviflorum	Lamiaceae	געדה זעירת-פרחים				
2414	Teucrium procerum	Lamiaceae	געדה קיפחת				
2415	Teucrium pruinosum	Lamiaceae	געדה מאובקת				
2416	Teucrium scordium	Lamiaceae	געדת הביצות				
2417	Teucrium spinosum	Lamiaceae	געדה קוצנית				
2418	Thalassodendron ciliatum	Cymodoceaceae	בת-גלית ריסנית				
2419	Thalictrum isopyroides	Ranunculaceae	דק-נוף צהבהב				
2420	Theligonum cynocrambe	Theligonaceae	טרשנית שרועה				
2421	Thelypteris palustris	Thelypteridaceae	גפית הביצה				
2422	Thesium bergeri	Santalaceae	חלוקה הררית				
2423	Thesium humile	Santalaceae	חלוקה ננסית				
2424	Thlaspi arvense	Brassicaceae	חפניים נדירים				
2425	Thlaspi brevicaule	Brassicaceae	חופניים נמוכים				
2426	Thlaspi perfoliatum	Brassicaceae	חפנים מצויים				
2427	Thymbra spicata	Lamiaceae	צתרנית משובלת				
2428	Thymelaea gussonei	Thymelaeaceae	מתנן צמיר				
2429	Thymelaea hirsuta	Thymelaeaceae	מתנן שעיר				
2430	Thymelaea passerina	Thymelaeaceae	מתנן מצוי				
2431	Thymus bovei	Lamiaceae	בת-קורנית הערבות				
2432	Tolpis barbata	Asteraceae	קיטה סוככנית				
2433	Tolpis virgata	Asteraceae	קיטה רותמית				
2434	Tordylium aegyptiacum	Apiaceae	דרכמונית מצרית				
2435	Tordylium carmeli	Apiaceae	דל-קרניים כרמלי				
2436	Tordylium cordatum	Apiaceae	סלסילת הכרמל				
2437	Tordylium syriacum	Apiaceae	דרכמונית סורית				
2438	Tordylium trachycarpum	Apiaceae	סלסילה מצויה				
2439	Torilis arvensis	Apiaceae	גזיר מזיק				
2440	Torilis gaillardotii	Apiaceae	גזיר גיירדו				
2441	Torilis japonica	Apiaceae	גזיר נדיר				
2442	Torilis leptophylla	Apiaceae	גזיר צר-עלים				
2443	Torilis nodosa	Apiaceae	גזיר המפרקים				
2444	Torilis tenella	Apiaceae	גזיר דקיק				
2445	Torilis webbii	Apiaceae	גזיר מגובשש				
2446	Trachomitum venetum	Apocynaceae	סם-כלב מזרחי				
2447	Trachyspermum ammi	Apiaceae	כמנונית קופטית				
2448	Traganum nudatum	Chenopodiaceae	זיזיים חשופים				
2449	Tragopogon buphthalmoides	Asteraceae	זקן-תיש צהוב				
2450	Tragopogon coelesyriacus	Asteraceae	זקן-תיש ארוך				
2451	Tragopogon collinus	Asteraceae	זקן-תיש מדברי				
2452	Tribulus bimucronatus	Zygophyllaceae	קוטב דו-זיזי				
2453	Tribulus macropterus	Zygophyllaceae	קוטב הערוצים				
2454	Tribulus pentandrus	Zygophyllaceae	קוטב מכונף				
2455	Tribulus terrestris	Zygophyllaceae	קוטב מצוי				
2456	Trichodesma africana	Boraginaceae	צמרורה אפריקנית				
2457	Trichodesma boissieri	Boraginaceae	צמרורת בואסיה				
2458	Trichodesma ehrenbergii	Boraginaceae	צמרורת אהרנברג				
2459	Tricholaena teneriffae	Poaceae	בן-דוחן מדברי				
2460	Trifolium alexandrinum	Papilionaceae	תלתן אלכסנדרוני				
2461	Trifolium angustifolium	Papilionaceae	תלתן צר-עלים				
2462	Trifolium argutum	Papilionaceae	תלתן האלמוות				
2463	Trifolium arvense	Papilionaceae	תלתן השדה				
2464	Trifolium berytheum	Papilionaceae	תלתן בירותי				
2465	Trifolium billardierei	Papilionaceae	תלתן דגול				
2466	Trifolium blancheanum	Papilionaceae	תלתן בלאנש				
2467	Trifolium boissieri	Papilionaceae	תלתן בואסיה				
2468	Trifolium bullatum	Papilionaceae	תלתן גולתי				
2469	Trifolium campestre	Papilionaceae	תלתן חקלאי				
2470	Trifolium cherleri	Papilionaceae	תלתן הכפתורים				
2471	Trifolium clusii	Papilionaceae	תלתן קלוז				
2472	Trifolium clypeatum	Papilionaceae	תלתן תריסני				
2473	Trifolium constantinopolitanum	Papilionaceae	תלתן קושטא				
2474	Trifolium dasyurum	Papilionaceae	תלתן נאה				
2475	Trifolium dichroanthum	Papilionaceae	תלתן דו-גוני				
2476	Trifolium echinatum	Papilionaceae	תלתן חדוד				
2477	Trifolium eriosphaerum	Papilionaceae	תלתן צמיר				
2478	Trifolium erubescens	Papilionaceae	תלתן מאדים				
2479	Trifolium fragiferum	Papilionaceae	תלתן הביצות				
2480	Trifolium glanduliferum	Papilionaceae	תלתן בלוטי				
2481	Trifolium glomeratum	Papilionaceae	תלתן מגובב				
2482	Trifolium grandiflorum	Papilionaceae	תלתן הדור				
2483	Trifolium hirtum	Papilionaceae	תלתן שעיר				
2484	Trifolium israeliticum	Papilionaceae	תלתן ישראלי				
2485	Trifolium lappaceum	Papilionaceae	תלתן קיפודני				
2486	Trifolium leucanthum	Papilionaceae	תלתן לבן				
2487	Trifolium meironense	Papilionaceae	תלתן מרוני				
2488	Trifolium micranthum	Papilionaceae	תלתן נימי				
2489	Trifolium nigrescens	Papilionaceae	תלתן רפה				
2490	Trifolium palaestinum	Papilionaceae	תלתן ארץ-ישראלי				
2491	Trifolium pauciflorum	Papilionaceae	תלתן דל-פרחים				
2492	Trifolium philistaeum	Papilionaceae	תלתן פלשתי				
2493	Trifolium physodes	Papilionaceae	תלתן משולחף				
2494	Trifolium pilulare	Papilionaceae	תלתן הכדורים				
2495	Trifolium plebeium	Papilionaceae	תלתן נחות				
2496	Trifolium prophetarum	Papilionaceae	תלתן הנביאים				
2497	Trifolium purpureum	Papilionaceae	תלתן הארגמן				
2498	Trifolium repens	Papilionaceae	תלתן זוחל				
2499	Trifolium resupinatum	Papilionaceae	תלתן הפוך				
2500	Trifolium salmoneum	Papilionaceae	תלתן סלמוני				
2501	Trifolium scabrum	Papilionaceae	תלתן דוקרני				
2502	Trifolium scutatum	Papilionaceae	תלתן המגן				
2503	Trifolium spumosum	Papilionaceae	תלתן הקצף				
2504	Trifolium stellatum	Papilionaceae	תלתן כוכבני				
2505	Trifolium subterraneum	Papilionaceae	תלתן תת-קרקעי				
2506	Trifolium suffocatum	Papilionaceae	תלתן חנוק				
2507	Trifolium sylvaticum	Papilionaceae	תלתן היערות				
2508	Trifolium tomentosum	Papilionaceae	תלתן לביד				
2509	Trifolium vavilovii	Papilionaceae	תלתן ווילוב				
2510	Trigonella arabica	Papilionaceae	גרגרנית ערבית				
2511	Trigonella balansae	Papilionaceae	גרגרנית מקרינה				
2512	Trigonella berythea	Papilionaceae	גרגרנית בירותית				
2513	Trigonella brachycarpa	Papilionaceae	גרגרנית קצרת-פרי				
2514	Trigonella caelesyriaca	Papilionaceae	גרגרנית סורית				
2515	Trigonella cylindracea	Papilionaceae	גרגרנית גלילנית				
2516	Trigonella filipes	Papilionaceae	גרגרנית נימית				
2517	Trigonella glabra	Papilionaceae	גרגרנית מואבית				
2518	Trigonella hamosa	Papilionaceae	גרגרנית מאונקלת				
2519	Trigonella hierosolymitana	Papilionaceae	גרגרנית ירושלים				
2520	Trigonella lilacina	Papilionaceae	גרגרנית לילכית				
2521	Trigonella maritima	Papilionaceae	גרגרנית החוף				
2522	Trigonella schlumbergeri	Papilionaceae	גרגרנית מדברית				
2523	Trigonella sibthorpii	Papilionaceae	גרגרנית יהודה				
2524	Trigonella spicata	Papilionaceae	גרגרנית משובלת				
2525	Trigonella spinosa	Papilionaceae	גרגרנית הטבעת				
2526	Trigonella spruneriana	Papilionaceae	גרגרנית ספרונר				
2527	Trigonella stellata	Papilionaceae	גרגרנית כוכבנית				
2528	Triplachne nitens	Poaceae	תלת-חוד מבריק				
2529	Tripleurospermum auriculatum	Asteraceae	בבונגית אוזנית				
2530	Tripleurospermum oreades	Asteraceae	בבונגית ההרים				
2531	Tripodion tetraphyllum	Papilionaceae	שלחופן קרומי				
2532	Tripteris vaillantii	Asteraceae	שלוש-כנפות מדבריות				
2533	Trisetaria glumacea	Poaceae	שילשון גלומני				
2534	Trisetaria koelerioides	Poaceae	שילשון חופי				
2535	Trisetaria linearis	Poaceae	שילשון סרגלני				
2536	Trisetaria macrochaeta	Poaceae	שילשון מדברי				
2537	Trisetaria michelii	Poaceae	שילשון מישל				
2538	Trisetum flavescens	Poaceae	שלשית מצהיבה				
2539	Triticum	Poaceae	חיטת הבר				
2540	Tulipa agenensis	Liliaceae	צבעוני ההרים				
2541	Tulipa lownei	Liliaceae	צבעוני החרמון				
2542	Tulipa polychroma	Liliaceae	צבעוני ססגוני				
2543	Tulipa systola	Liliaceae	צבעוני המדבר				
2544	Turgenia latifolia	Apiaceae	טורגניה רחבת-עלים				
2545	Turritis laxa	Brassicaceae	טורית רפה				
2546	Typha angustifolia	Typhaceae	סוף צר-עלים				
2547	Typha domingensis	Typhaceae	סוף מצוי				
2548	Typha elephantina	Typhaceae	סוף הקרין				
2549	Typha latifolia	Typhaceae	סוף רחב-עלים				
2550	Ulmus minor	Ulmaceae	בוקיצה שעירה				
2551	Umbilicus intermedius	Crassulaceae	טבורית נטויה				
2552	Drimia maritima (syn. Urginea maritima)	Asparagaceae	חצב מצוי				
2553	Drimia undata (syn. Urginea undulata)	Asparagaceae	חצב גלוני				
2554	Urochloa mutica	Poaceae	נסמנית קיפחת				
2555	Urochloa panicoides	Poaceae	נסמנית הדוחן				
2556	Urochloa texana	Poaceae	נסמנית טקסס				
2557	Urospermum picroides	Asteraceae	אזנב מצוי				
2558	Urtica kioviensis	Urticaceae	סרפד חולה				
2559	Urtica membranacea	Urticaceae	סרפד קרומי				
2560	Urtica pilulifera	Urticaceae	סרפד הכדורים				
2561	Urtica urens	Urticaceae	סרפד צורב				
2562	Utricularia australis	Lentibulariaceae	נאדיד המים				
2563	Utricularia gibba	Lentibulariaceae	נאדיד עדין				
2564	Vaccaria hispanica	Caryophyllaceae	סבונית השדות				
2565	Valantia hispida	Rubiaceae	חגווית שעירה				
2566	Valantia muralis	Rubiaceae	חגווית החומות				
2567	Valeriana dioscoridis	Valerianaceae	ולריינה איטלקית				
2568	Valerianella carinata	Valerianaceae	ולריינית הקרינים				
2569	Valerianella coronata	Valerianaceae	ולריינית עטורה				
2570	Valerianella dactylophylla	Valerianaceae	ולריינית מאוצבעת				
2571	Valerianella dufresnia	Valerianaceae	ולריינית מכונפת				
2572	Valerianella echinata	Valerianaceae	ולריינית דוקרנית				
2573	Valerianella kotschyi	Valerianaceae	ולריינית קוטשי				
2574	Valerianella muricata	Valerianaceae	ולריינית קטועה				
2575	Valerianella orientalis	Valerianaceae	ולריינית מזרחית				
2576	Valerianella oxyrrhyncha	Valerianaceae	ולריינית שתי-שיניים				
2577	Valerianella pumila	Valerianaceae	ולריינית זעירה				
2578	Valerianella sclerocarpa	Valerianaceae	ולריינית קשת-פרי				
2579	Valerianella szovitsiana	Valerianaceae	ולריינית ערבתית				
2580	Valerianella tuberculata	Valerianaceae	ולריינית מגובששת				
2581	Valerianella vesicaria	Valerianaceae	ולריינית משולחפת				
2582	Vallisneria spiralis	Hydrocharitaceae	וליסנריה סלולה				
2583	Velezia fasciculata	Caryophyllaceae	גביעול מאוגד				
2584	Velezia rigida	Caryophyllaceae	גביעול אשון				
2585	Verbascum agrimoniifolium	Scrophulariaceae	בוצין שונה-עלים				
2586	Verbascum berytheum	Scrophulariaceae	בוצין בירותי				
2587	Verbascum caesareum	Scrophulariaceae	בוצין קיסריון				
2588	Verbascum cedreti	Scrophulariaceae	בוצין הארזים				
2589	Verbascum damascenum	Scrophulariaceae	בוצין דמשקאי				
2590	Verbascum decaisneanum	Scrophulariaceae	בוצין קטן-פרחים				
2591	Verbascum eremobium	Scrophulariaceae	בוצין המדבר				
2592	Verbascum fruticulosum	Scrophulariaceae	בוצין שיחני				
2593	Verbascum gaillardotii	Scrophulariaceae	בוצין לקוי				
2594	Verbascum galilaeum	Scrophulariaceae	בוצין הגליל				
2595	Verbascum jordanicum	Scrophulariaceae	בוצין הירדן				
2596	Verbascum leptostachyum	Scrophulariaceae	בוצין דק-שיבולת				
2597	Verbascum levanticum	Scrophulariaceae	בוצין אפקי				
2598	Verbascum orientale	Scrophulariaceae	בוצין מזרחי				
2599	Verbascum petrae	Scrophulariaceae	בוצין פטרה				
2600	Verbascum qulebicum	Scrophulariaceae	בוצין הבשן				
2601	Verbascum schimperianum	Scrophulariaceae	בוצין שימפר				
2602	Verbascum sinaiticum	Scrophulariaceae	בוצין סיני				
2603	Verbascum sinuatum	Scrophulariaceae	בוצין מפורץ				
2604	Verbascum tiberiadis	Scrophulariaceae	בוצין טברייני				
2605	Verbascum tripolitanum	Scrophulariaceae	בוצין טריפולי				
2606	Verbena officinalis	Verbenaceae	ורבנה רפואית				
2607	Verbena supina	Verbenaceae	ורבנה שרועה				
2608	Veronica anagallis-aquatica	Scrophulariaceae	ורוניקת המים				
2609	Veronica anagalloides	Scrophulariaceae	ורוניקה עדינה				
2610	Veronica arvensis	Scrophulariaceae	ורוניקת השדה				
2611	Veronica biloba	Scrophulariaceae	ורוניקה דו-אונתית				
2612	Veronica campylopoda	Scrophulariaceae	ורוניקה כפופת-עוקץ				
2613	Veronica cymbalaria	Scrophulariaceae	ורוניקה לבנה				
2614	Veronica hederifolia	Scrophulariaceae	ורוניקה קיסוסית				
2615	Veronica hispidula	Scrophulariaceae	ורוניקה מחוספסת				
2616	Veronica leiocarpa	Scrophulariaceae	ורוניקה קירחת				
2617	Veronica lysimachioides	Scrophulariaceae	ורוניקת החולה				
2618	Veronica macrostachya	Scrophulariaceae	ורוניקה ארוכת-שיבולת				
2619	Veronica orientalis	Scrophulariaceae	ורוניקה מזרחית				
2620	Veronica panormitana	Scrophulariaceae	ורוניקה קטנת-פרחים				
2621	Veronica persica	Scrophulariaceae	ורוניקה פרסית				
2622	Veronica polifolia	Scrophulariaceae	ורוניקה אפרפרה				
2623	Veronica polita	Scrophulariaceae	ורוניקה מבריקה				
2624	Veronica scardica	Scrophulariaceae	ורוניקה סקרדית				
2625	Veronica syriaca	Scrophulariaceae	ורוניקה סורית				
2626	Veronica viscosa	Scrophulariaceae	ורוניקה דביקה				
2627	Viburnum tinus	Caprifoliaceae	מורן החורש				
2628	Vicia basaltica	Papilionaceae	בקיית הבזלת				
2629	Vicia benghalensis	Papilionaceae	בקיה ארגמנית				
2630	Vicia bithynica	Papilionaceae	בקיה אנטולית				
2631	Vicia cuspidata	Papilionaceae	בקיה חדודה				
2632	Vicia cypria	Papilionaceae	בקיית קפריסין				
2633	Vicia ervilia	Papilionaceae	בקיית הכרשינה				
2634	Vicia esdraelonensis	Papilionaceae	בקיית יזרעאל				
2635	Vicia galeata	Papilionaceae	בקיית הביצות				
2636	Vicia galilaea	Papilionaceae	בקיית הגליל				
2637	Vicia hulensis	Papilionaceae	בקיית החולה				
2638	Vicia hybrida	Papilionaceae	בקיית הכלאיים				
2639	Vicia lathyroides	Papilionaceae	בקיה טופחנית				
2640	Vicia lutea	Papilionaceae	בקיה צהובה				
2641	Vicia monantha	Papilionaceae	בקיה מדורבנת				
2642	Vicia narbonensis	Papilionaceae	בקיה צרפתית				
2643	Vicia palaestina	Papilionaceae	בקיה ארץ-ישראלית				
2644	Vicia parviflora	Papilionaceae	בקיה דקיקה				
2645	Vicia peregrina	Papilionaceae	בקיה מצויה				
2646	Vicia pubescens	Papilionaceae	בקיה קטנה				
2647	Vicia sativa	Papilionaceae	בקיה תרבותית				
2648	Vicia sericocarpa	Papilionaceae	בקיית המשי				
2649	Vicia tenuifolia	Papilionaceae	בקיה דקת-עלים				
2650	Vicia tetrasperma	Papilionaceae	בקיה עדינה				
2651	Vicia villosa	Papilionaceae	בקיה שעירה				
2652	Vigna luteola	Papilionaceae	לוביה מצרית				
2653	Vinca herbacea	Apocynaceae	וינקה עשבונית				
2654	Vincetoxicum dionysiense	Asclepiadaceae	איסם קטן-פרחים				
2655	Viola kitaibeliana	Violaceae	סיגל ססגוני				
2656	Viola modesta	Violaceae	סיגל צנוע				
2657	Viola occulta	Violaceae	סיגל עטוי				
2658	Viola odorata	Violaceae	סיגל ריחני				
2659	Viola parvula	Violaceae	סיגל קטן				
2660	Viola pentadactyla	Violaceae	סיגל תמים				
2661	Viscum cruciatum	Loranthaceae	דבקון הזית				
2662	Vitex agnus-castus	Verbenaceae	שיח-אברהם מצוי				
2663	Vitex pseudo-negundo	Verbenaceae	שיח-אברהם קיפח				
2664	Vitis vinifera	Vitaceae	גפן היערות				
2665	Volutaria crupinoides	Asteraceae	ישימונית דו-גונית				
2666	Volutaria lippii	Asteraceae	ישימונית ורודה				
2667	Vulpia brevis	Poaceae	שעלב קצר				
2668	Vulpia ciliata	Poaceae	שעלב ריסני				
2669	Vulpia fasciculata	Poaceae	שעלב מקופח				
2670	Vulpia membranacea	Poaceae	שעלב קרומי				
2671	Vulpia muralis	Poaceae	שעלב ארוך				
2672	Vulpia myuros	Poaceae	שעלב מצוי				
2673	Vulpia persica	Poaceae	שעלב פרסי				
2674	Vulpia unilateralis	Poaceae	שעלב עדין				
2675	Wiedemannia orientalis	Lamiaceae	וידמניה מזרחית				
2676	Withania obtusifolia	Solanaceae	ויתניה קהה				
2677	Withania somnifera	Solanaceae	ויתניה משכרת				
2678	Wolffia arrhiza	Lemnaceae	כדרורית המים				
2679	Xanthium spinosum	Asteraceae	לכיד קוצני				
2680	Xanthium strumarium	Asteraceae	לכיד הנחלים				
2681	Xeranthemum cylindraceum	Asteraceae	יבשוש גלילני				
2682	Xolantha guttata	Cistaceae	שמשונית הטיפין				
2683	Zaleya pentandra	Aizoaceae	זליה מחומשת				
2684	Zannichellia palustris	Zannichelliaceae	חוטית הביצות				
2685	Zilla spinosa	Brassicaceae	סילון קוצני				
2686	Zingeria biebersteiniana	Poaceae	רפרפון עדין				
2687	Ziziphora capitata	Lamiaceae	אבובית מקורקפת				
2688	Ziziphora clinopodioides	Lamiaceae	אבובית החרטומים				
2689	Ziziphora tenuior	Lamiaceae	אבובית עדינה				
2690	Ziziphus lotus	Rhamnaceae	שיזף השיח				
2691	Ziziphus nummularia	Rhamnaceae	שיזף שעיר				
2692	Ziziphus spina-christi	Rhamnaceae	שיזף מצוי		عناب		
2693	Zoegea leptaurea	Asteraceae	זגאה כתומה				
2694	Zoegea purpurea	Asteraceae	זגאה ארגמנית				
2695	Zosima absinthiifolia	Apiaceae	זוזימה מדברית				
2696	Zygophyllum album	Zygophyllaceae	זוגן לבן				
2697	Zygophyllum coccineum	Zygophyllaceae	זוגן אדום				
2698	Zygophyllum dumosum	Zygophyllaceae	זוגן השיח				
2699	Zygophyllum fabago	Zygophyllaceae	זוגן רחב				
2700	Zygophyllum simplex	Zygophyllaceae	זוגן פשוט				
