= Polygonum littorale =

Polygonum littorale is a botanical synonym of four species of plant:

- Bistorta vivipara, Polygonum littorale (Greene) Fedde, publish 1905, nomen illegitimum
- Polygonum aviculare, Polygonum littorale Link, published 1821, nomen illegitimum
- Polygonum maritimum, Polygonum littorale Pers., published 1805
- Polygonum roberti, Polygonum littorale Gren. & Godr., published 1855, nomen illegitimum
