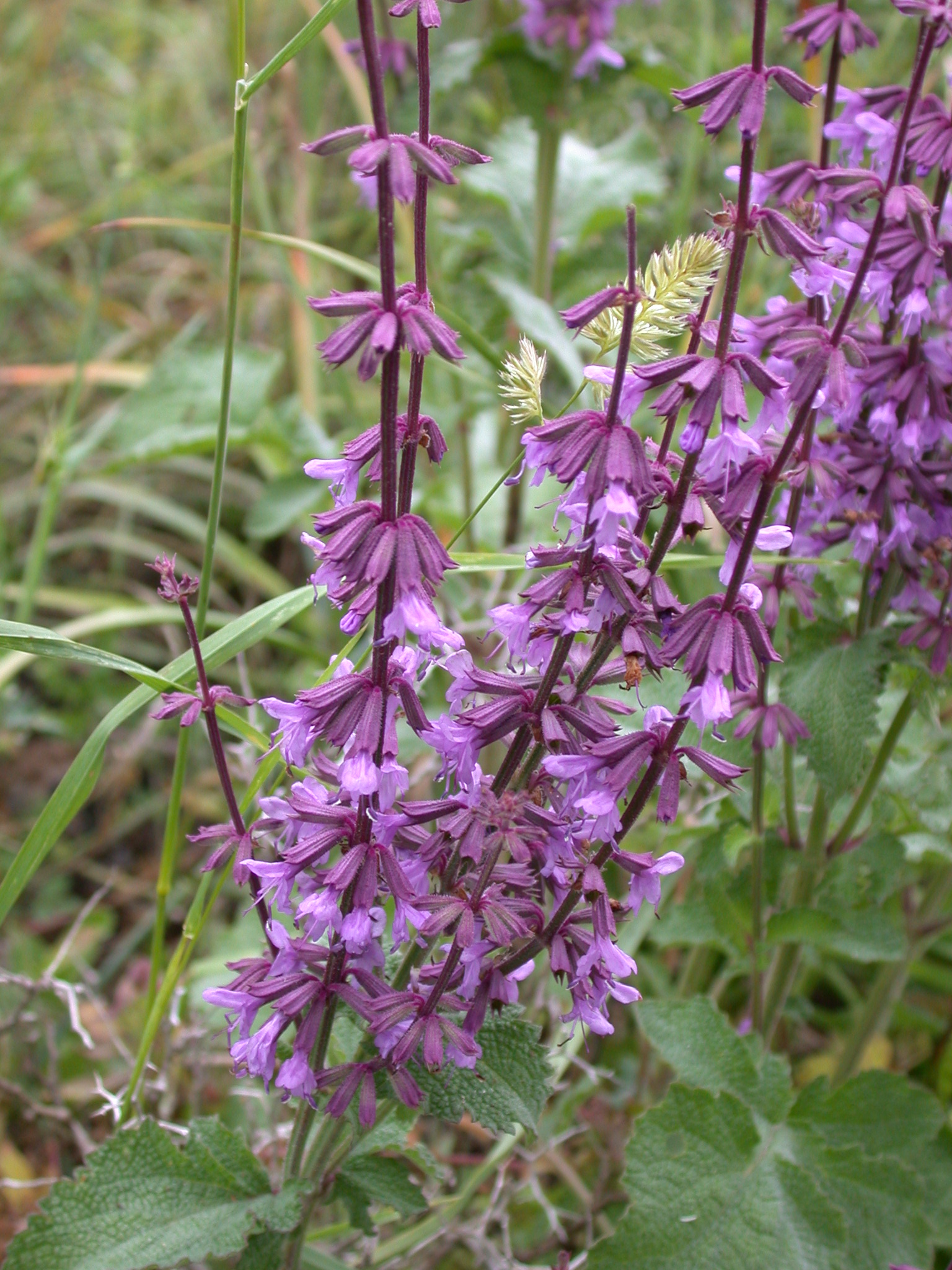

Scientific classification
- Kingdom: Plantae
- Clade: Tracheophytes
- Clade: Angiosperms
- Clade: Eudicots
- Clade: Asterids
- Order: Lamiales
- Family: Lamiaceae
- Genus: Salvia
- Species: S. judaica

Binomial name
- Salvia judaica Boiss.

= Salvia judaica =

Species of plant in the mint family

Salvia judaica is a species of flowering plant in the Lamiaceae family. It is a perennial commonly called Judean sage that is native to Mediterranean woodlands and shrublands, with violet flowers blooming from April to June.
