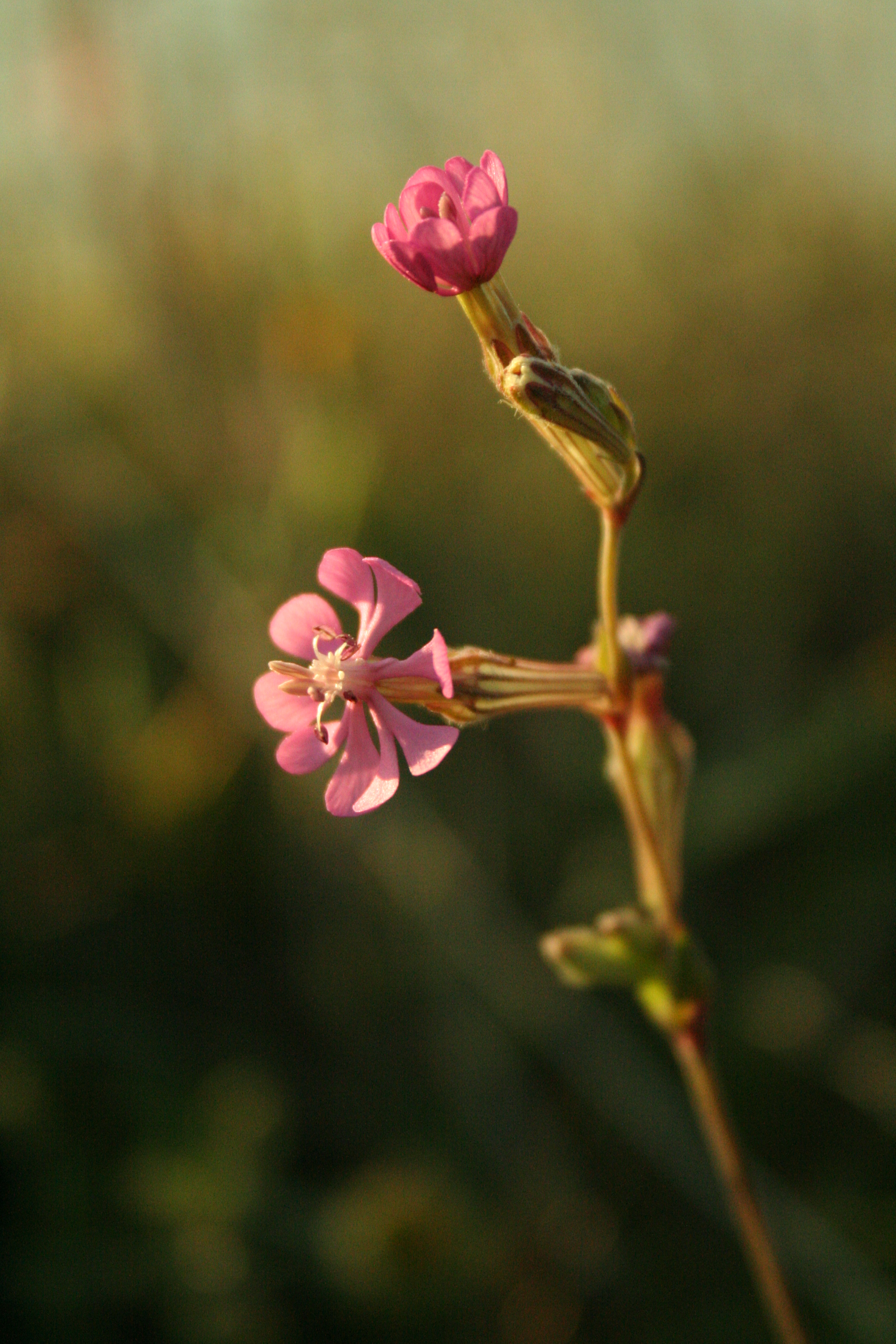

Scientific classification
- Kingdom: Plantae
- Clade: Tracheophytes
- Clade: Angiosperms
- Clade: Eudicots
- Order: Caryophyllales
- Family: Caryophyllaceae
- Genus: Silene
- Species: S. colorata

Binomial name
- Silene colorata Poir.

= Silene colorata =

Species of flowering plant

Silene colorata is a species of plant in the family Caryophyllaceae. It is native to Lebanon and surrounding mediterranean areas.
