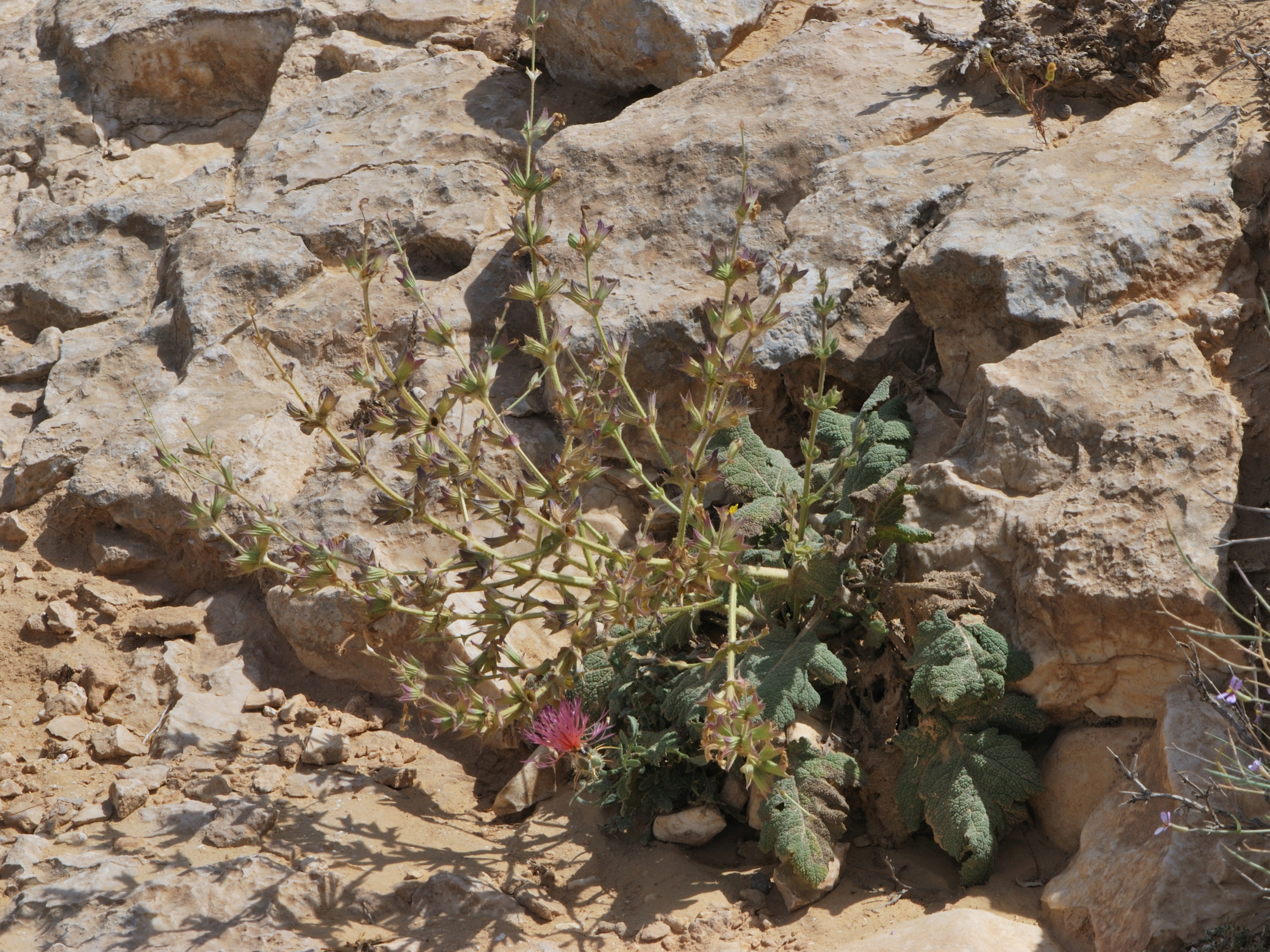

Scientific classification
- Kingdom: Plantae
- Clade: Embryophytes
- Clade: Tracheophytes
- Clade: Spermatophytes
- Clade: Angiosperms
- Clade: Eudicots
- Clade: Asterids
- Order: Lamiales
- Family: Lamiaceae
- Genus: Salvia
- Species: S. palaestina

Binomial name
- Salvia palaestina Benth.

= Salvia palaestina =

Species of plant

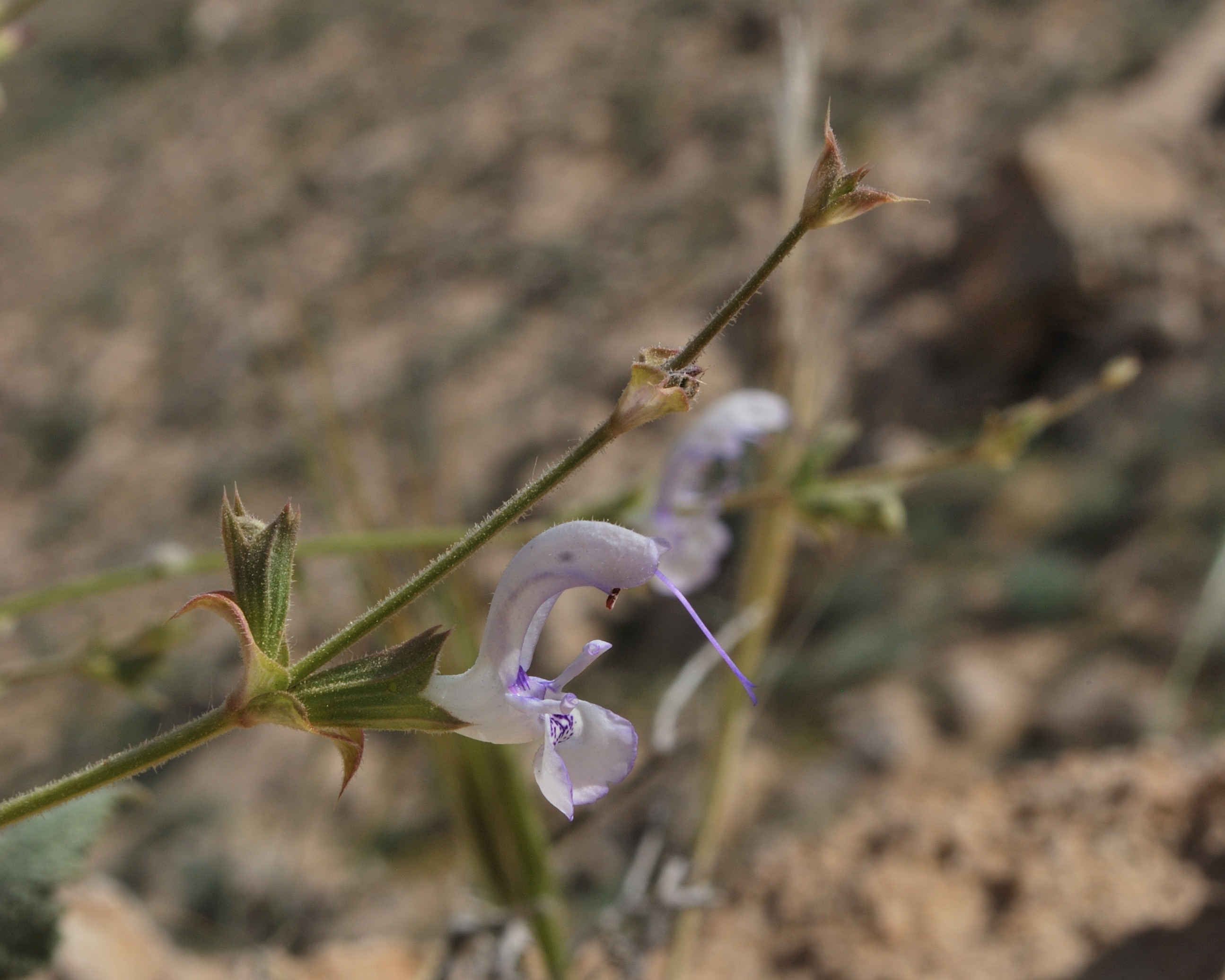
Salvia palaestina flower close-up

Salvia palaestina is a herbaceous perennial native to a wide area including Palestine, and is also native to Turkey, Syria, Israel, Lebanon, Iraq, Iran, the Sinai peninsula and northeastern Egypt. It was named and described by George Bentham in 1835, with the specific epithet (palaestina) referring to its geographical distribution "in Palæstinæ montibus inter Gaza et Jerusalem", or the mountains between Gaza and Jerusalem.

S. palaestina grows in a wide variety of habitats, between 1,000 to 4,000 ft (300 to 1,220 m) elevation. It was introduced into horticulture in the 1990s. The plant grows 1 to 2 ft (0.30 to 0.61 m) tall, with an upright habit and many square stems growing from basal roots. The mid-green rugose leaves vary in shape and size, with light hairs on both sides, and glands that release a scent when rubbed or crushed. The 12 in (30 cm) inflorescences grow candelabrum-like at the top of the stems, with 4–6 flowers per whorl. The .5 in (1.3 cm) flowers are straight and tubular, ranging in color from white to pale lilac.
