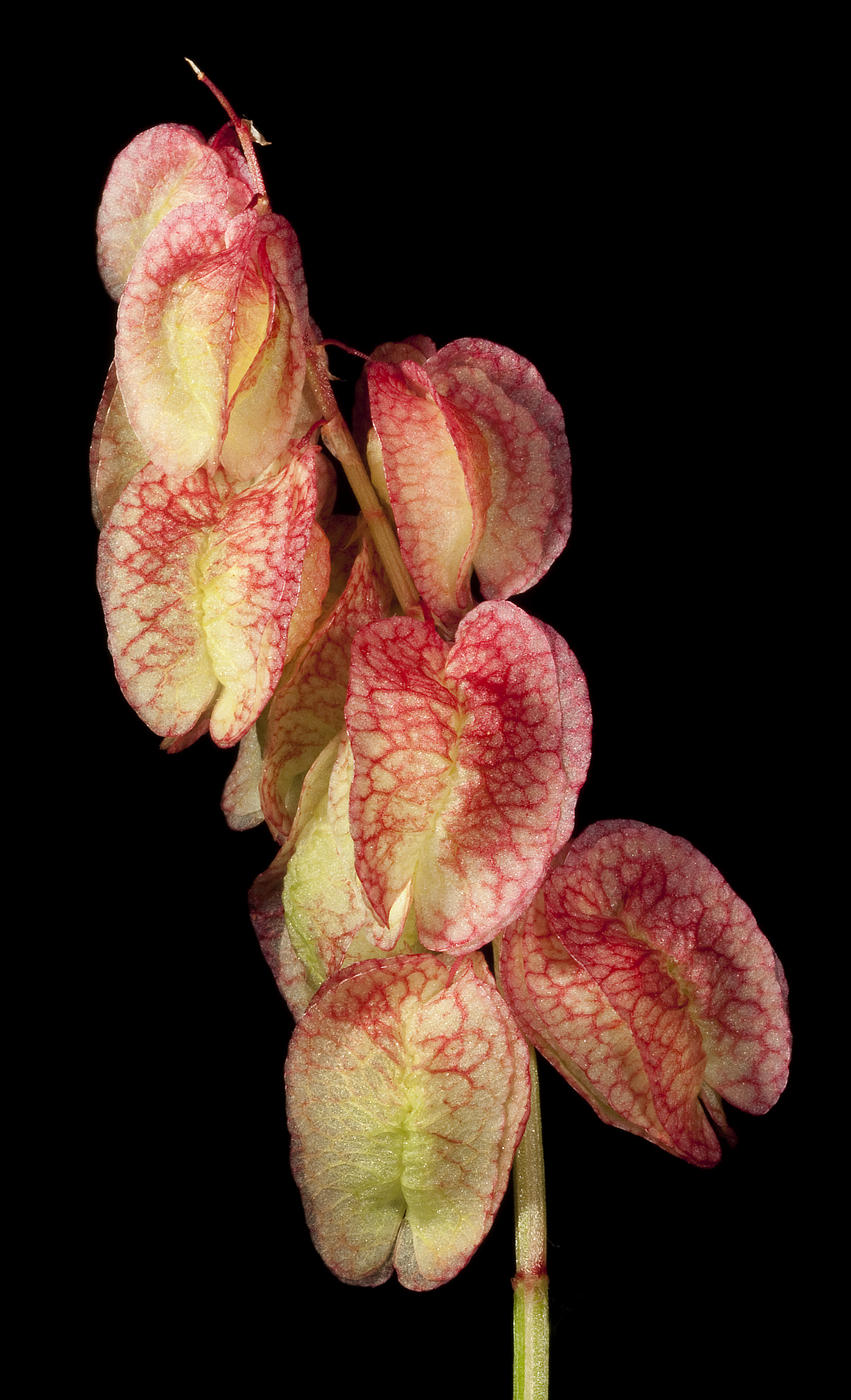

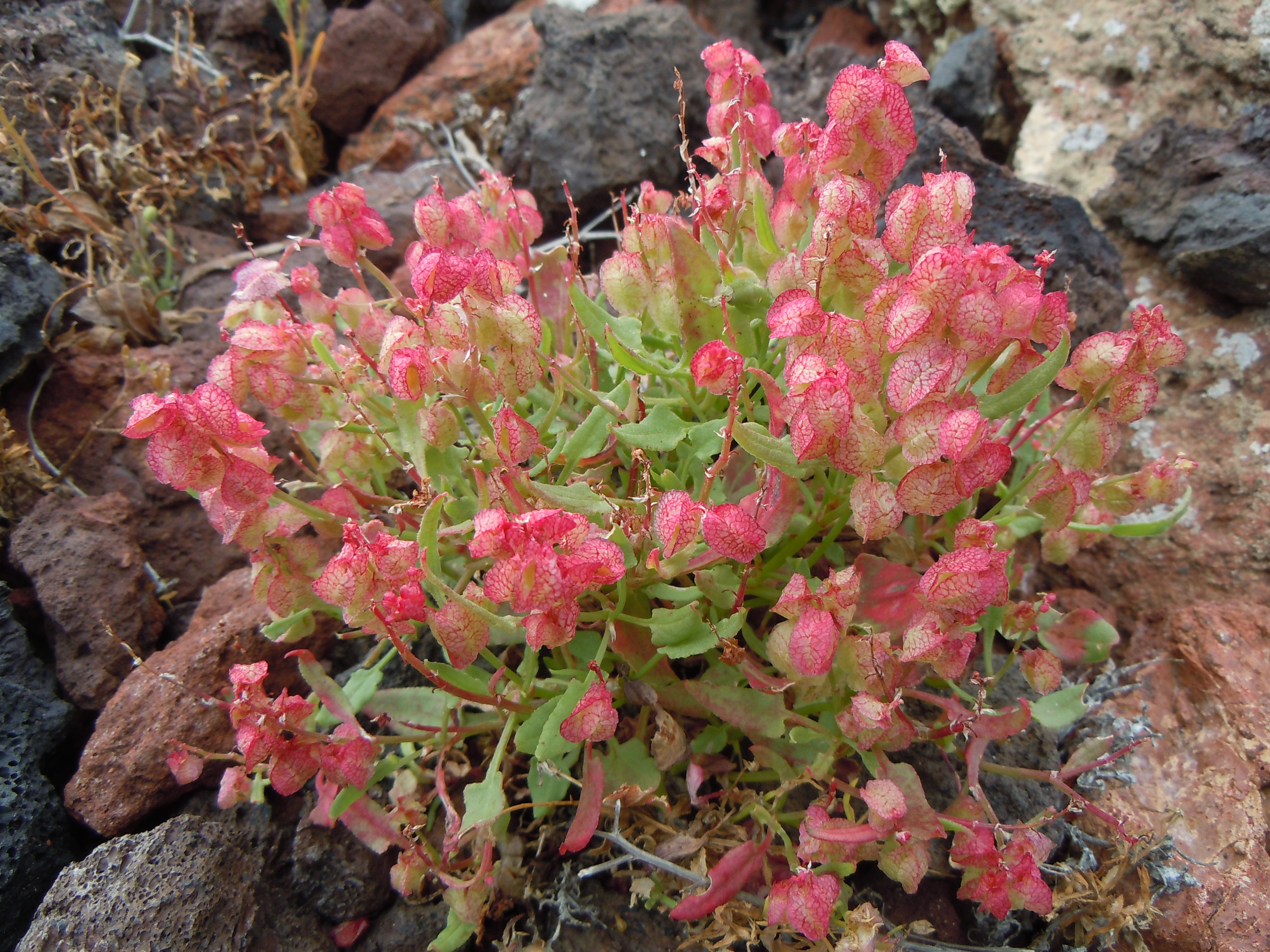
- Cultivar

Scientific classification
- Kingdom: Plantae
- Clade: Tracheophytes
- Clade: Angiosperms
- Clade: Eudicots
- Order: Caryophyllales
- Family: Polygonaceae
- Genus: Rumex
- Species: R. vesicarius

Binomial name
- Rumex vesicarius L.

Synonyms
- Acetosa vesicaria (L.) Á.Löve; Lapathum vesicarium (L.) Moench; Rumex americanus Campd.; Rumex bolosii Stübing, Peris & Romo; Rumex clementii Domin

= Rumex vesicarius =

Species of flowering plant

Rumex vesicarius, also known as ruby dock, rosy dock or bladder dock, is a species of perennial flowering plant in the family Polygonaceae. According to Plants of the World Online, Rumex vesicarius is native to tropical and temperate Asia, Africa, and Western Australia. However, the Council of Heads of Australasian Herbaria asserts that within Australia it is naturalised in Western Australia, the Northern Territory, South Australia, Queensland and New South Wales.

== Description ==
It is an erect, succulent annual herb which grows to up about 60 cm high, and has triangular to ovate leaves which are truncate or cordate at the base and about 5–10 cm long, with entire margins. The stipules form an almost complete sheath around the stem which disintegrates. The flowers are green with a red tinge, and have six perianth segments with the inner three becoming enlarged and papery when fruiting. The hard, red and reticulately veined fruit persist, giving rise to spectacular displays.

== Etymology ==
The specific epithet, vesicarius, derives from the Latin word, vesica, meaning "bladder", to give an adjective which describes the fruit of the plant as "inflated", "bladder-like".

== Popular culture ==
The plant appears in the children's story book The Story of Rosy Dock by Jeannie Baker. The collage picture book uses the arrival and naturalisation of the rosy dock to draw on themes of colonisation and sustainability for children.
