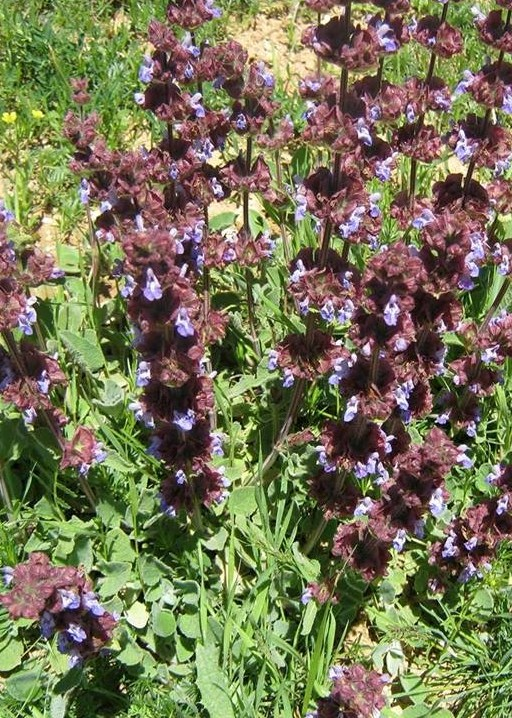
- Salvia multicaulis growing in its natural habitat in Tannourine cedar reserve, Lebanon

Scientific classification
- Kingdom: Plantae
- Clade: Tracheophytes
- Clade: Angiosperms
- Clade: Eudicots
- Clade: Asterids
- Order: Lamiales
- Family: Lamiaceae
- Genus: Salvia
- Species: S. multicaulis

Binomial name
- Salvia multicaulis Vahl

Synonyms
- S. acetabulosa

= Salvia multicaulis =

Species of shrub

Salvia multicaulis is a low-growing perennial shrub native to Turkey and bordering countries. Plants grow into mats up to 90 cm (3.0 ft) wide, with erect woody stems. The plant reaches 15 cm (5.9 in) tall, though the flowering stems reach 30 to 45 cm (12 to 18 in). The oval leaves are grey-green, 3 cm (1.2 in) long by 2 cm (0.79 in) wide, with a rugose upper surface and whitish hairy underside.

Small violet flowers grow in whorls of 4–10 with conspicuous reddish-brown bracts. It has been reported that the plant has significant antioxidant and antimicrobial activity.
