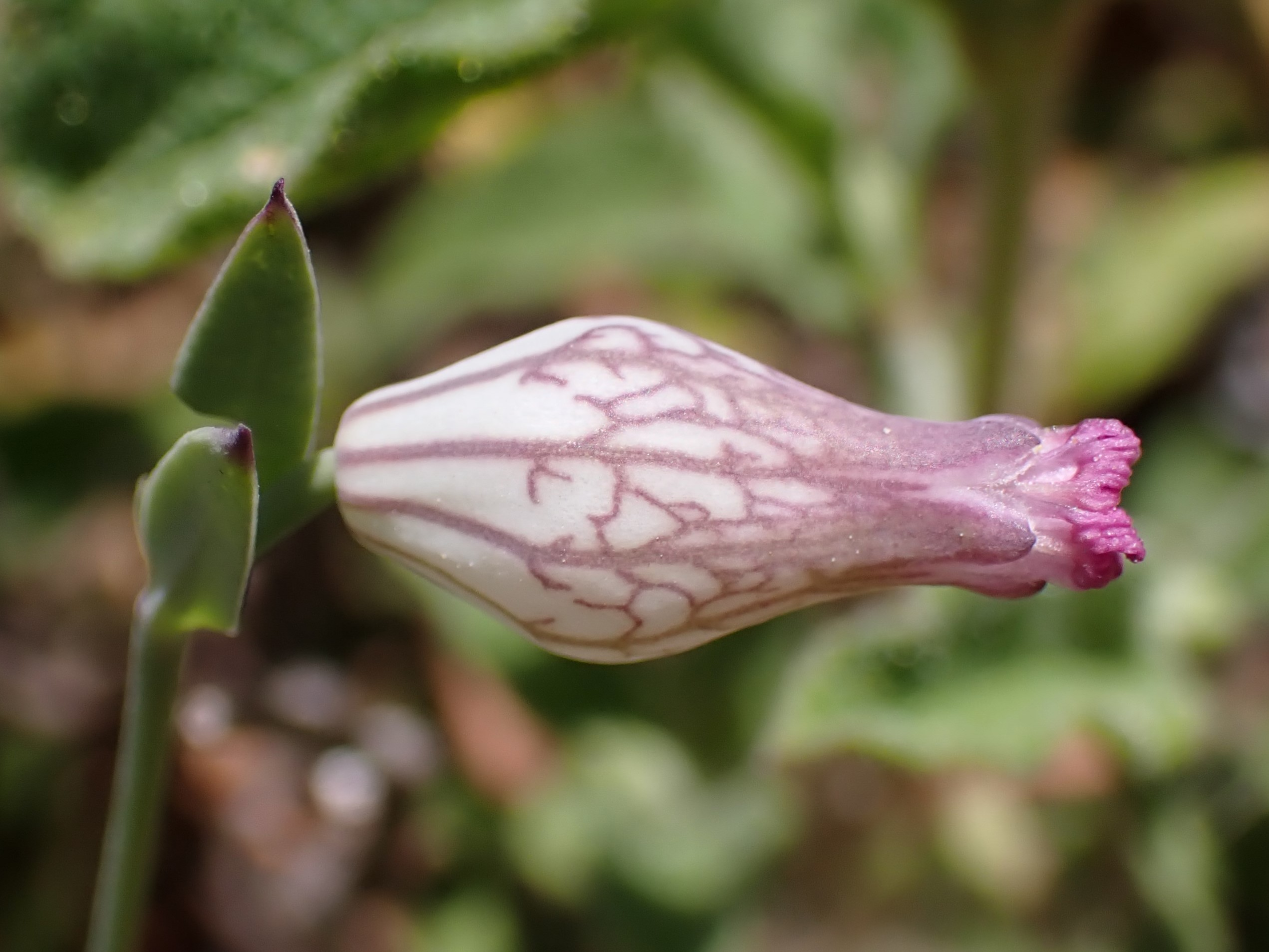

Scientific classification
- Kingdom: Plantae
- Clade: Embryophytes
- Clade: Tracheophytes
- Clade: Angiosperms
- Clade: Eudicots
- Order: Caryophyllales
- Family: Caryophyllaceae
- Genus: Silene
- Species: S. behen

Binomial name
- Silene behen L.

= Silene behen =

Species of plant

Silene behen is a species of annual herb in the family Caryophyllaceae (carpetweeds). They have a self-supporting growth form and simple, broad leaves. Individuals can grow to 0.4 metres (1 1/2 feet).
