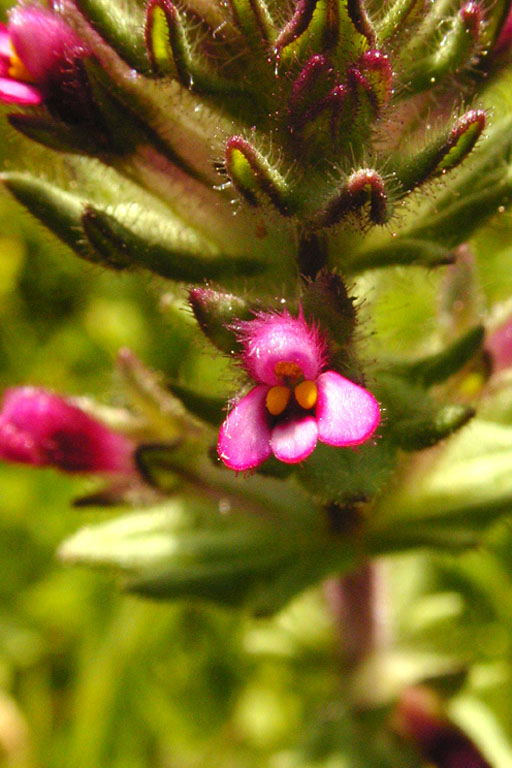

Scientific classification
- Kingdom: Plantae
- Clade: Tracheophytes
- Clade: Angiosperms
- Clade: Eudicots
- Clade: Asterids
- Order: Lamiales
- Family: Orobanchaceae
- Genus: Parentucellia
- Species: P. latifolia

Binomial name
- Parentucellia latifolia (L.) Caruel

= Parentucellia latifolia =

Species of flowering plant

Parentucellia latifolia is a species of flowering plant in the family Orobanchaceae known by several common names, including red bartsia, red tarweed, and broadleaf glandweed. It is native to Europe, but it can be found on other continents, including Australia, as an introduced species. This is an erect annual herb producing a stiff, slender stem coated in hairs and sticky glands. It reaches a maximum height near 30 centimeters. The hairy leaves are divided into triangular or lance-shaped lobes. The inflorescence is a raceme of flowers at the end of the stem. The flower is tubular, the calyx of sepals extending about halfway along the centimeter-long corolla. The corolla is magenta in color, sometimes with white areas, and bearing two raised yellow appendages in the lobed throat.
