= Tamarix gennessarensis =

Scientific classification
- Kingdom: Plantae
- Clade: Tracheophytes
- Clade: Angiosperms
- Clade: Eudicots
- Order: Caryophyllales
- Family: Tamaricaceae
- Genus: Tamarix
- Species: T. gennessarensis

Binomial name
- Tamarix gennessarensis Zohary

Species of plant

Tamarix gennessarensis is a species of flowering plant in the tamarisk family Tamaricaceae, native to the Anti-Lebanon Mountains of Lebanon and Syria, and to northeastern Israel. It is a shrub of riparian habitats.
