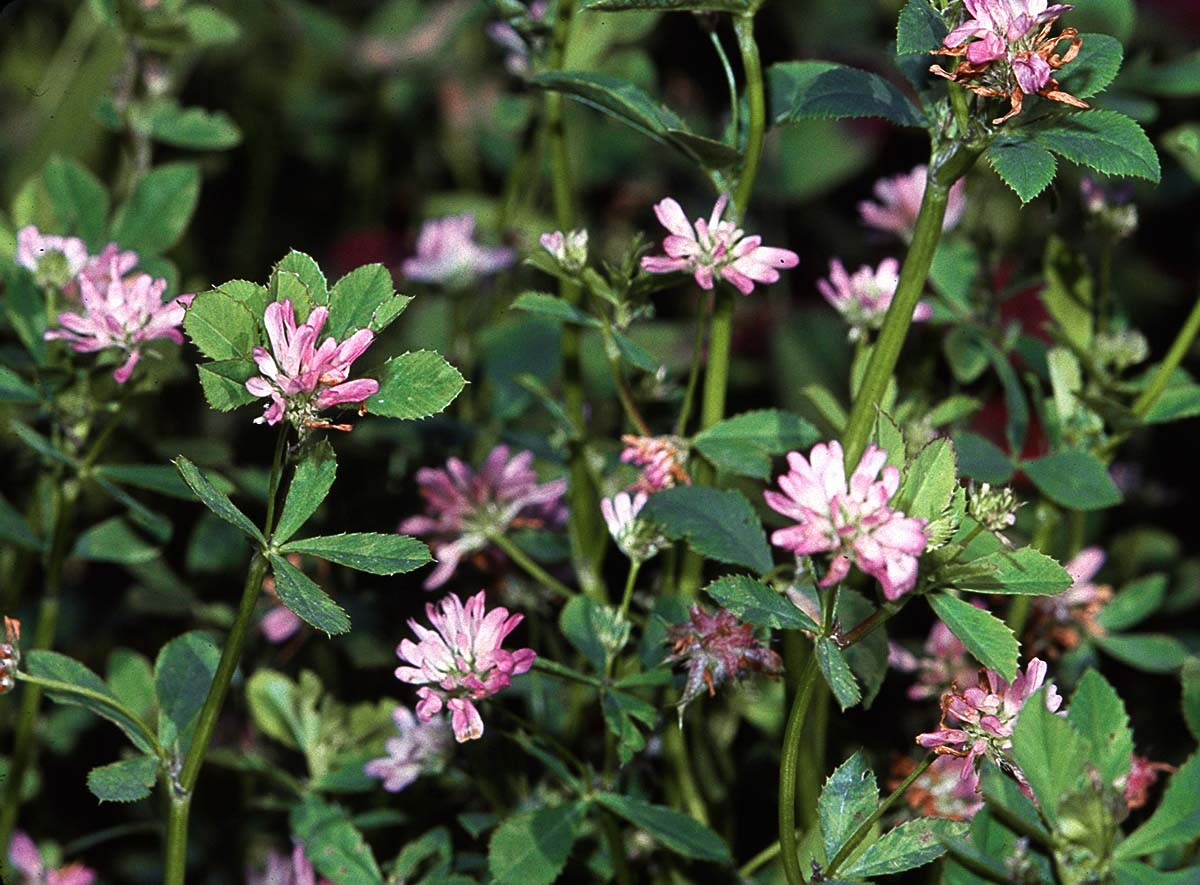

Scientific classification
- Kingdom: Plantae
- Clade: Tracheophytes
- Clade: Angiosperms
- Clade: Eudicots
- Clade: Rosids
- Order: Fabales
- Family: Fabaceae
- Subfamily: Faboideae
- Genus: Trifolium
- Species: T. resupinatum

Binomial name
- Trifolium resupinatum L.

= Trifolium resupinatum =

Species of legume

Trifolium resupinatum (reversed clover, Persian clover, shaftal, syn. T. resupinatum L. var. majus Boss., T. suaveolens Willd.) is an annual clover used as fodder and hay, which reaches 60 cm (24 in) tall when cultivated, and forms rosettes when grazed or mowed.

It is native to central and southern Europe, the Mediterranean, and southwest Asia as far south as the Punjab. It is an important hay crop in cold regions of Iran, Afghanistan and other Asian areas with cold winters.

== Subspecies ==
- Trifolium resupinatum var. majus Boss (syn. T. suaveolens Willd.)
- Trifolium resupinatum var. resupinatum Gib & Belli.
- Trifolium resupinatum var. microcephalum Zoh.
