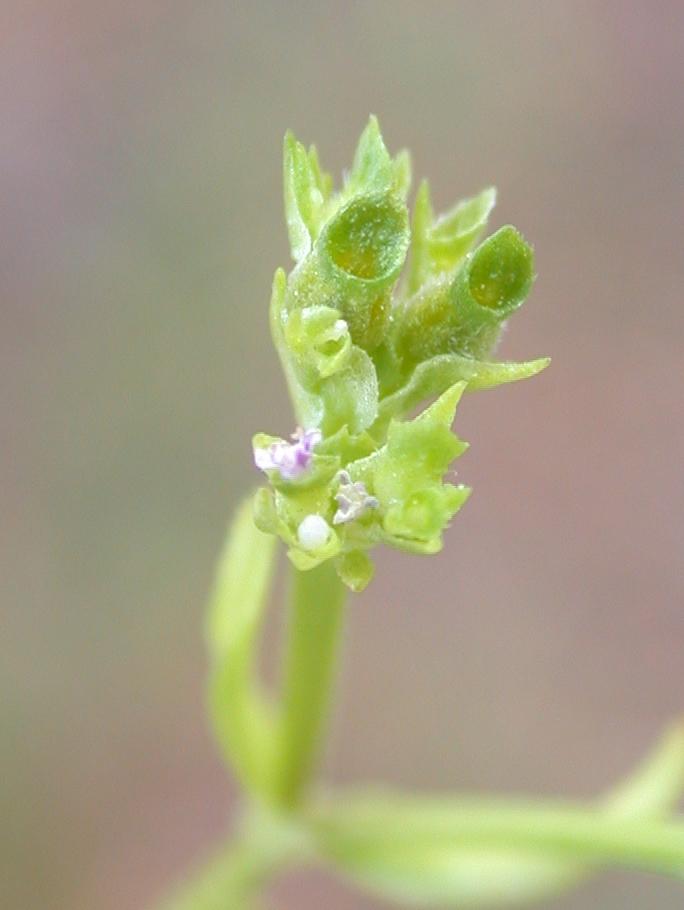

Scientific classification
- Kingdom: Plantae
- Clade: Tracheophytes
- Clade: Angiosperms
- Clade: Eudicots
- Clade: Asterids
- Order: Dipsacales
- Family: Caprifoliaceae
- Genus: Valeriana
- Species: V. muricata

Binomial name
- Valeriana muricata (Steven ex M.Bieb.) Sennikov (2021)

Synonyms
- Fedia dentata Sieber ex Betcke (1826), nom. illeg.; Fedia eriocarpa Steven (1817), nom. illeg.; Fedia muricata Steven ex M.Bieb. (1817) (basionym); Fedia truncata Rchb. (1824); Valerianella eriocarpa Krok ex Grossh. (1934), nom. illeg.; Valerianella eriocarpa subsp. muricata (Steven ex M.Bieb.) Nyman (1879); Valerianella eriocarpa var. muricata (Steven ex M.Bieb.) Krok (1864); Valerianella eriocarpa subsp. truncata (Rchb.) Burnat (1915); Valerianella eriocarpa var. truncata (Rchb.) Batt. (1889); Valerianella ibizae Sennen & Elías (1928 publ. 1929); Valerianella muricata (Steven ex M.Bieb.) W.H.Baxter (1850); Valerianella truncata (Rchb.) Betcke (1826); Valerianella truncata var. muricata (Steven ex M.Bieb.) Boiss. (1875), nom. superfl.

= Valeriana muricata =

Species of flowering plant

Valeriana muricata, synonym Valerianella muricata, is a species of flowering plant in the family Caprifoliaceae. It is an annual which ranges from Greece and the Eastern Mediterranean through western and central Asia, the Caucasus, and the western Himalayas.

== Sources ==
This article incorporates text from a free content work. Licensed under CC0 (license statement/permission). Text taken from Valerianella muricata. Encyclopedia of Life.
