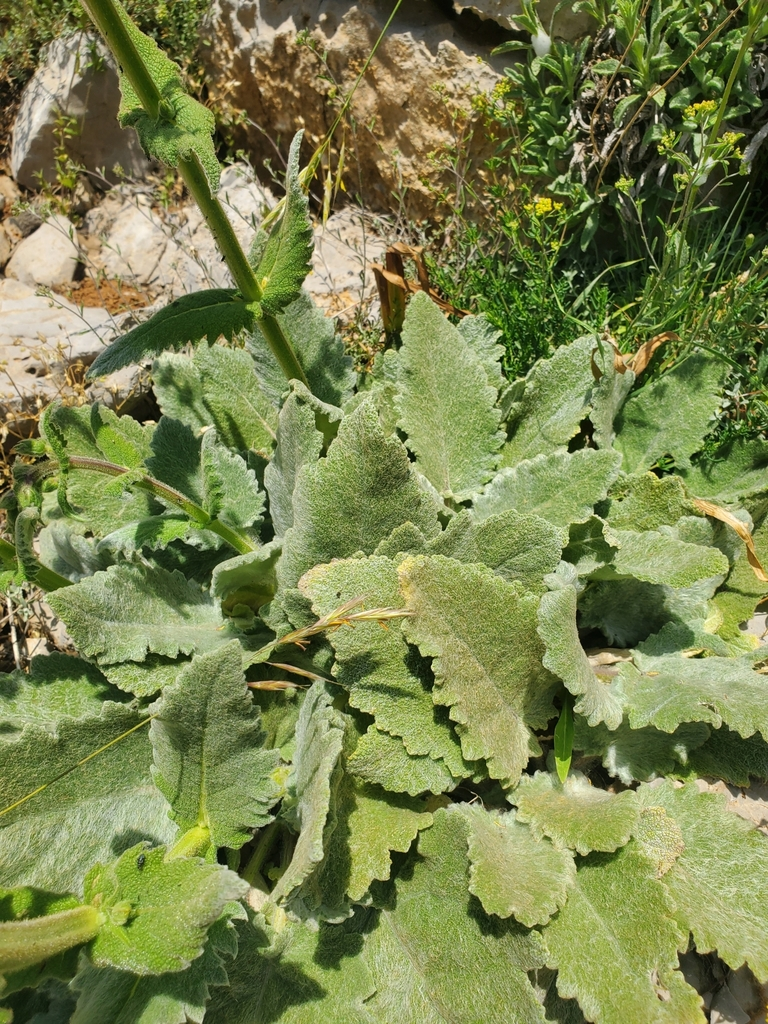

Scientific classification
- Kingdom: Plantae
- Clade: Tracheophytes
- Clade: Angiosperms
- Clade: Eudicots
- Clade: Asterids
- Order: Lamiales
- Family: Lamiaceae
- Genus: Salvia
- Species: S. microstegia

Binomial name
- Salvia microstegia Boiss. & Balansa

Synonyms
- Salvia chnoodes Stapf

= Salvia microstegia =

Species of plant in the mint family

Salvia microstegia is a herbaceous perennial plant in the family Lamiaceae. It is native to Israel, growing on Mount Hermon. The plant has white or pale violet flowers, blooming from June to September.
