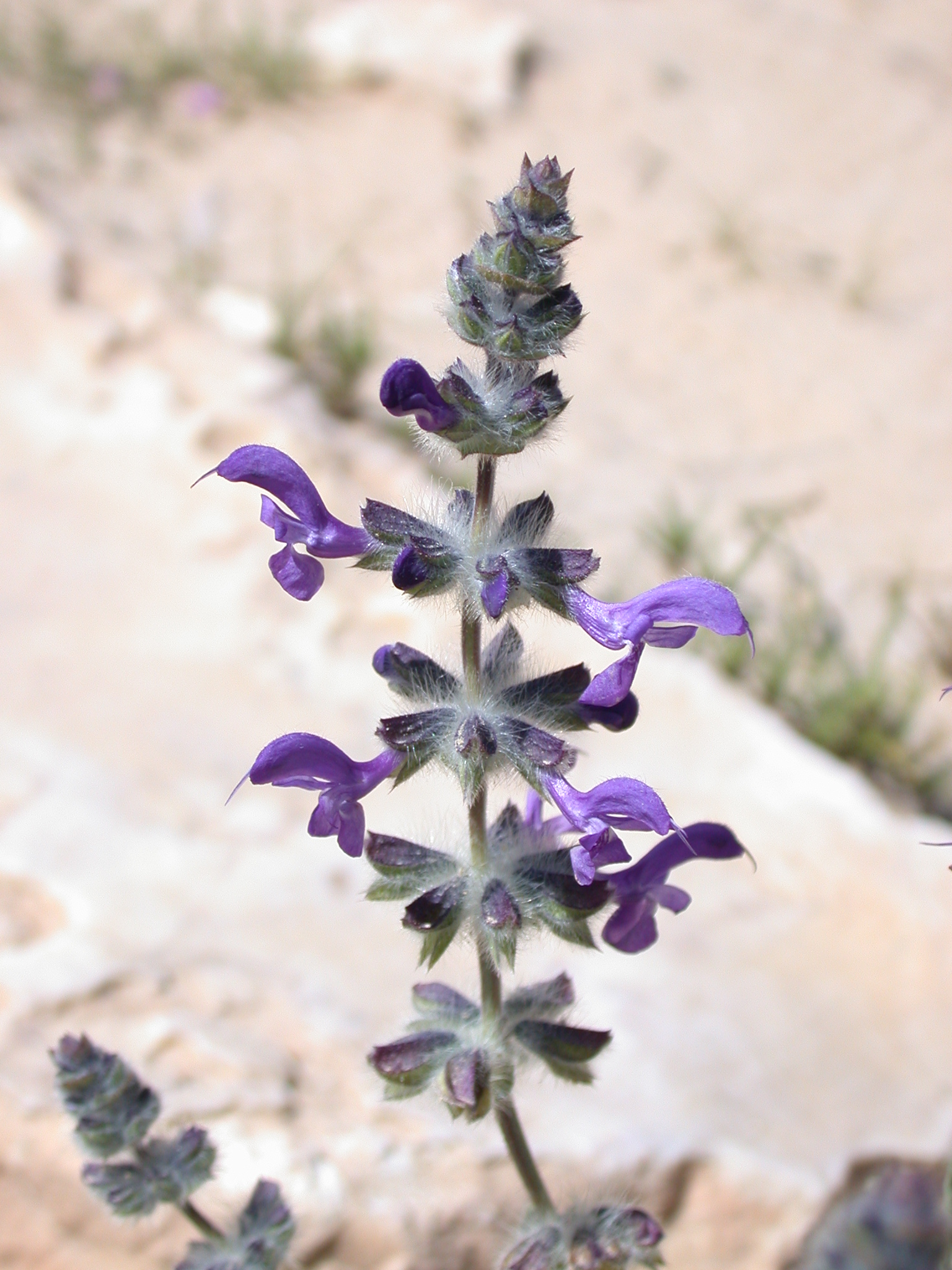

Scientific classification
- Kingdom: Plantae
- Clade: Tracheophytes
- Clade: Angiosperms
- Clade: Eudicots
- Clade: Asterids
- Order: Lamiales
- Family: Lamiaceae
- Genus: Salvia
- Species: S. lanigera

Binomial name
- Salvia lanigera Poir.

= Salvia lanigera =

Species of plant

Salvia lanigera (Libyan wild clary) is a small herbaceous perennial that is native from northern Egypt and Arabia, to the south of Turkey and Iran. It grows in low altitude deserts, in sandy loam and chalky sandstone soils. The specific epithet "lanigera" means "wool-bearing" or "fleecy", referring to the hairs that cover all parts of the plant. It was first described in 1817 by Jean Louis Marie Poiret, a French clergyman sent by Louis XVI to Algeria to study the native plants. Following the French Revolution, Poiret became a professor at the Grandes écoles in Aisne.

In cultivation it grows from 4-8 inches high, and up to 1 foot in its native habitat. The plant is a soft pale gray-green color, giving off a pungent odor when brushed, and is covered with short erect hairs. The narrow leaves are deeply divided, with linear segments. The violet flowers grow in whorls of 6–8, and are held in a tiny calyx covered in long white hairs. In cold climates it is treated as an annual, freely reseeding itself, with seeds overwintering even in sub-freezing climates. It adapts itself to small spaces in between other plants, preferring full sun, lean soil, moderate irrigation, and good drainage.
