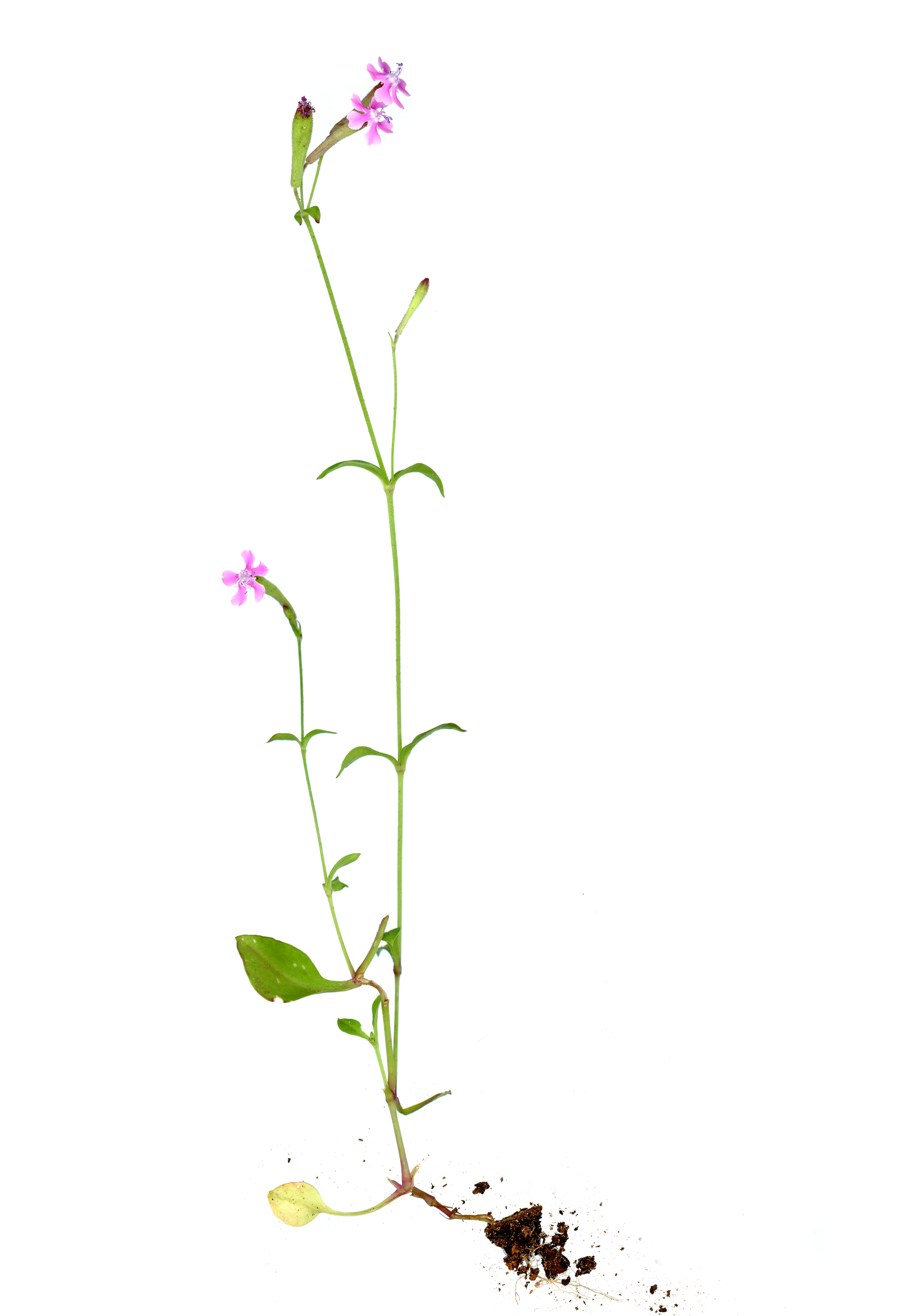

Scientific classification
- Kingdom: Plantae
- Clade: Tracheophytes
- Clade: Angiosperms
- Clade: Eudicots
- Order: Caryophyllales
- Family: Caryophyllaceae
- Genus: Silene
- Species: S. aegyptiaca

Binomial name
- Silene aegyptiaca (L.) L.f.

Synonyms
- Cucubalus aegyptiacus L.; Saponaria atocioides Boiss.; Silene atocia St.-Lag.; Silene atocion L.; Silene orchidea L.f.; Silene retroflexa Steud.

= Silene aegyptiaca =

Species of flowering plant

Silene aegyptiaca is a species of flowering plant in the family Caryophyllaceae. The common name for this species is Egyptian campion or Egyptian catchfly.

The species can be found across the Middle East.
