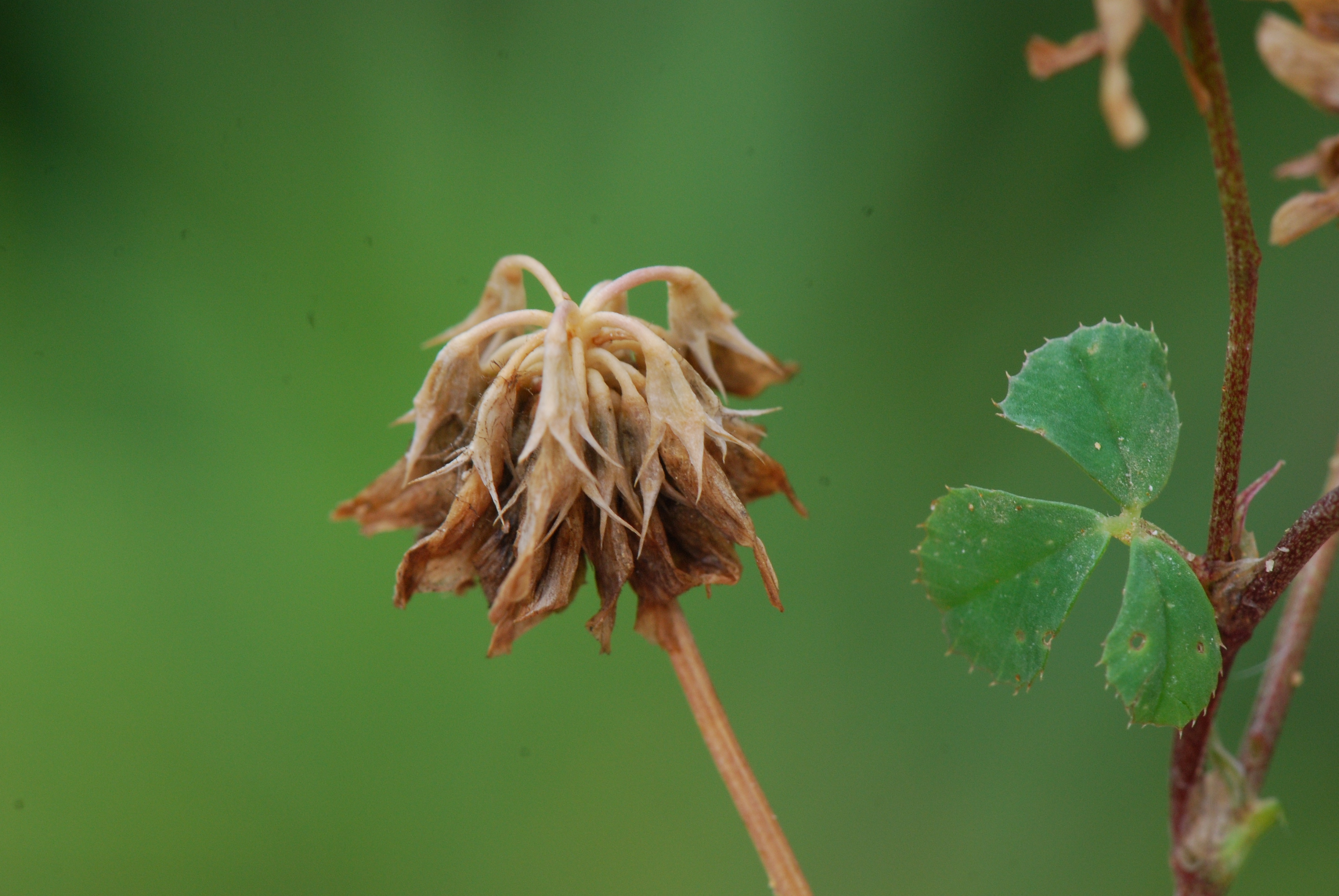

Scientific classification
- Kingdom: Plantae
- Clade: Tracheophytes
- Clade: Angiosperms
- Clade: Eudicots
- Clade: Rosids
- Order: Fabales
- Family: Fabaceae
- Subfamily: Faboideae
- Genus: Trifolium
- Species: T. nigrescens

Binomial name
- Trifolium nigrescens Viv., 1808

= Trifolium nigrescens =

Species of legume

Trifolium nigrescens, the small white clover, is an annual species which is widespread around the Mediterranean, including north Africa, and the Middle East.
