= Thalictrum isopyroides =

Scientific classification
- Kingdom: Plantae
- Clade: Embryophytes
- Clade: Tracheophytes
- Clade: Spermatophytes
- Clade: Angiosperms
- Clade: Eudicots
- Order: Ranunculales
- Family: Ranunculaceae
- Genus: Thalictrum
- Species: T. isopyroides

Binomial name
- Thalictrum isopyroides C.A.Mey.

Species of plant

Thalictrum isopyroides, the isopyrum-like meadow rue, is a species of flowering plant in the family Ranunculaceae. It has an Irano-Turanian distribution. A dwarf herbaceous perennial with tiny fern-like leaves, it is available from commercial suppliers.
