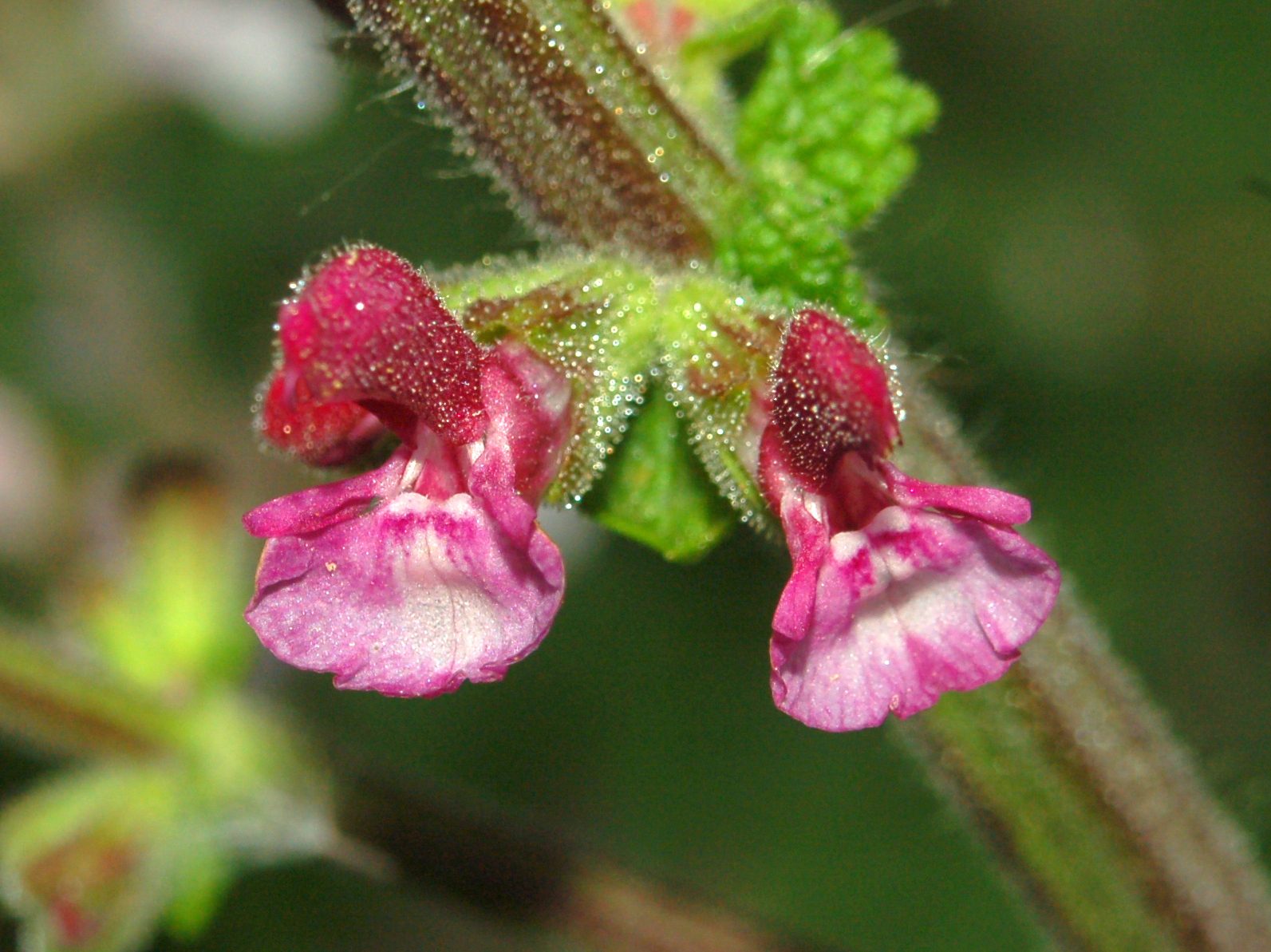
- Flowers of Salvia viscosa at the botanical garden of Villa Durazzo-Pallavicini, Genova Pegli

Scientific classification
- Kingdom: Plantae
- Clade: Tracheophytes
- Clade: Angiosperms
- Clade: Eudicots
- Clade: Asterids
- Order: Lamiales
- Family: Lamiaceae
- Genus: Salvia
- Species: S. viscosa

Binomial name
- Salvia viscosa Jacq.

= Salvia viscosa =

Species of flowering plant

Salvia viscosa is a herbaceous perennial native to a small area of mountains in Lebanon and Israel. It was first described in 1781 by Nikolaus Joseph von Jacquin but only began being sold in nurseries in the 1990s.

Salvia viscosa grows a small cluster of leaves from which 1 foot (0.30 m) inflorescences arise in midsummer. The misty green leaves are oblate-oblong, growing up to 4 inches (10 cm) long and 2 inches (5.1 cm) wide, with both surfaces covered by soft hairs, and whitish-green veining on the underside. The burgundy-red flowers are about .75 inches (1.9 cm) long, growing in whorls that are widely spaced along the thin stem, and are held in a tiny wine-colored calyx that is covered with hairs. The plant seeds profusely.
