= Polygonum maritimum =

- Praia Grande Nascente in district Faro in Portugal

Scientific classification
- Kingdom: Plantae
- Clade: Tracheophytes
- Clade: Angiosperms
- Clade: Eudicots
- Order: Caryophyllales
- Family: Polygonaceae
- Genus: Polygonum
- Species: P. maritimum

Binomial name
- Polygonum maritimum L.

Synonyms
- Centinodia maritima (L.) Fourr.; Polygonum aviculare var. littorale Chapm.

Plant species in the buckwheat family

Polygonum maritimum, the sea knotgrass, is a plant in the buckwheat family that is native to the beaches and areas near the sea around the Black Sea, Mediterranean Sea, the northwestern Atlantic coast of Europe, and the southern tip of Africa.

== Description ==
Sea knotgrass is a perenial plant that grows stems that are 10 to 50 centimeters tall. They are branched, thick, and spreading with a woody base.

The leaves are narrowly elliptical in shape, measuring 0.5–2.5 cm long with edges that roll towards the back of the leaf. They are hairless and usually turn black when they dry.

The small flowers are pink to fairly white and are found in the axils of the bracts, which resemble leaves. The flowers can be solitary or in groups of up to four.

== Taxonomy ==
Polygonum maritimum was named by Carl Linnaeus in 1753. The botanist Alvan Wentworth Chapman described it as a variety of Polygonum aviculare that he named littorale in 1860, but this did not become accepted. Likewise the 1869 proposal by Jules Pierre Fourreau of moving to Centinodia is also not accepted. The species is classified in the Polygonum within the Polygonaceae family. It has no accepted varieties, but has three among its eleven synonyms.

Table of Synonyms
Name	Year	Rank	Notes
Avicularia maritima Didr.	1850	species	= het.
Centinodia maritima (L.) Fourr.	1869	species	≡ hom.
Polygonum argenteum Ehrenb. ex Meisn.	1856	species	= het., not validly publ.
Polygonum aviculare var. littorale Chapm.	1860	variety	≡ hom.
Polygonum chilense K.Koch	1849	species	= het.
Polygonum littorale Pers.	1805	species	= het.
Polygonum maritimum Cham. & Schltdl.	1828	species	= het., nom. illeg. homonym. post.
Polygonum maritimum var. chilense (K.Koch) Skottsb.	1913	variety	= het.
Polygonum maritimum var. confusum Rouy	1910	variety	= het.
Polygonum maritimum var. roseum Pursh	1813	variety	= het.
Polygonum sanguinaria J.Rémy	1851	species	= het.
Notes: ≡ homotypic synonym; = heterotypic synonym

In English it is known by the common name sea knotgrass.

== Range and habitat ==
Sea knotgrass is native to western and southern Europe, western Asia near the Mediterranean, northern Africa, and the country of South Africa. The northernmost part of its natural range is in the British Isles, growing in southern England and Cornwall. Due to climate change it is likely that this species is growing further north due to warmer summers, and increasing number of the plant found in southern England support this idea. However, the occurrence in County Waterford in southern Ireland has not been documented since 1974, and it was similarly only found once in the Netherlands on the coast of Noord-Beveland in 1962. In northern France it grows as far east as Normandy.

Plants generally grow in sand or shingle near the oceans.
