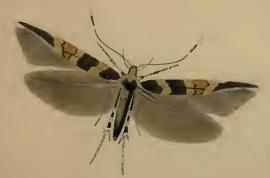

Scientific classification
- Kingdom: Animalia
- Phylum: Arthropoda
- Class: Insecta
- Order: Lepidoptera
- Family: Cosmopterigidae
- Genus: Cosmopterix
- Species: C. schmidiella

Binomial name
- Cosmopterix schmidiella (Frey, 1856)

Synonyms
- Cosmopteryx schmidiella Frey, 1856; Cosmopterix schmidiella ab. obsoleta Banks

= Cosmopterix schmidiella =

Species of moth

Cosmopterix schmidiella is a moth of the family Cosmopterigidae. It is found from most of Great Britain to Romania, and from Japan through central Russia to the Iberian Peninsula. It is believed to be extinct in Britain.

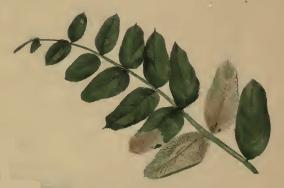
A leaf of Vicia sepium with leaflets discoloured by larva

Larva

The wingspan is 9-9.5 mm. Adults are on wing from August to May. Then the larva hibernates outside of the mine in a hibernaculum.

The larvae feed on Lathyrus montanus, Lathyrus niger, Vicia sepium and Vicia pisiformis. They mine the leaves of their host plant.

== Subspecies ==
- Cosmopterix schmidiella schmidiella
- Cosmopterix schmidiella mongoliella Sinev, 1979 (Mongolia)
