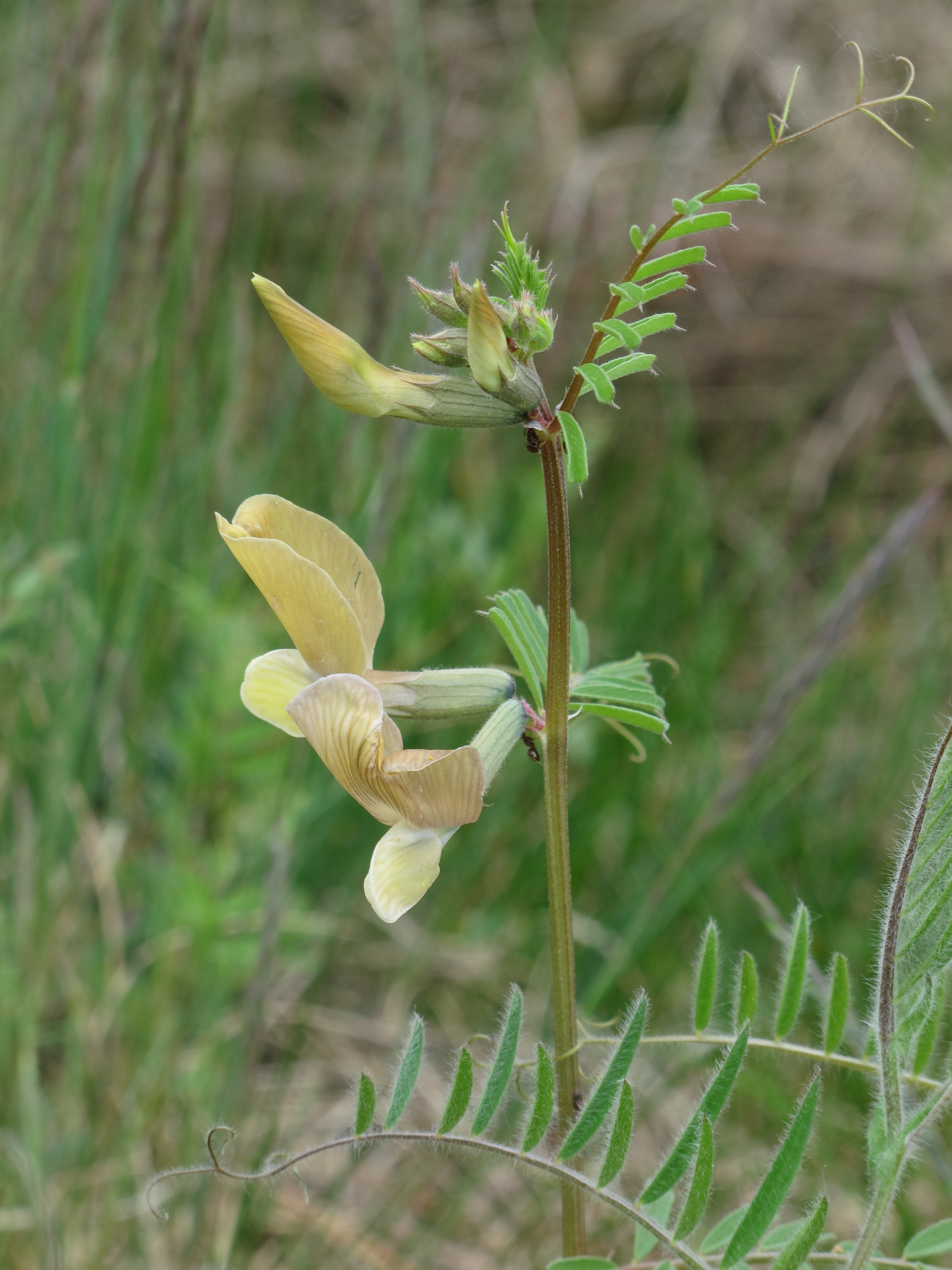

Conservation status
- Least Concern (IUCN 3.1)

Scientific classification
- Kingdom: Plantae
- Clade: Tracheophytes
- Clade: Angiosperms
- Clade: Eudicots
- Clade: Rosids
- Order: Fabales
- Family: Fabaceae
- Subfamily: Faboideae
- Genus: Vicia
- Species: V. grandiflora

Binomial name
- Vicia grandiflora Scop., 1772

Subspecies
- Vicia grandiflora grandiflora; Vicia grandiflora sordida (Alef.) Dostál

Synonyms
- Cujunia grandiflora (Scop.) Alef.; Vicia hungarica Heuff.; Vicia kitaibeliana (W.D.J.Koch) Stank.; Vicia kitaibeliana Schur.; Vicia lutea Pall.; Vicia lutea Pall. ex M.Bieb.; Vicia serrata Pant.; Vicia sordida Waldst. & Kit.; Vicia sordida Waldst. & Kit. ex Willd., 1802

= Vicia grandiflora =

Species of plant

Vicia grandiflora, commonly known as large yellow vetch and bigflower vetch, as well as large-flowered vetch, is a common herbaceous plant species in the family Fabaceae, which occurs as a native plant species in Europe and Asia, as well as an introduced vetch species in North America.

== Etymology ==
Its genus name Vicia is a Latin term for "vetch", while its species name, grandiflora, refers to the species' relatively large flowers and means "large-flowered".

== Taxonomy ==
Austrian naturalist Giovanni Antonio Scopoli described this species in 1772 in his work Flora Carniolica.

Taxonomists recognize two subspecies and a few varieties:

- Vicia grandiflora var. biebersteinii Griseb.
- Vicia grandiflora var. dissecta Boiss.
- Vicia grandiflora var. kitaibeliana W.D.J. Koch
- Vicia grandiflora var. sordida Griseb.
- Vicia. grandiflora subsp. grandiflora
- Vicia grandiflora subsp. sordida Dostál

== Description ==
This relatively common annual legume species can reach from 30 to 60 centimetres of height. It is usually an upright-growing and spread out hirsute vine plant. Vicia grandiflora has alternate leaves that are petiolate and pinnately compound, with its leaflets (pinna) being round to obovate in Vicia grandiflora subsp. grandiflora, and linear to oblanceolate, sometimes narrowly cordate, in Vicia grandiflora subsp. sordida. There are from 6 to 14 leaflets. Each leaflet ends with short and sharpened point. On the other hand, each leaf ends with three-part tendril.

This species is an entomophilous plant and flowers in spring time, usually from April to June. Vicia grandiflora has typical bilaterally symmetrical papilionaceous flower, that consists of banner, keel and wing, with petals being yellow. After time flowers lose their bright yellow colour and sometimes fade to pale lavender shade. Each flower measures from 2 to 3 centimetres, with a few combined flowers constituting an inflorescence. The latter can be both sessile and petiolate with short leafstalk. This species' sepals are fused together into a long calyx tube that is sometimes hirsute and ends with pointed calyx teeth.

This plant's dried fruit is a legume, that can measure from 3 to 5 centimetres. Usually the legume gets darker as it ages. When ripe, the legume splits open and releases seeds.

Vicia grandiflora can be mistaken for similar vetches Vicia lutea and Vicia pannonica, as well as the vetchling Lathyrus pratensis.

== Distribution and conservation ==
Vicia grandiflora grows in Europe and some parts of Asia as a native vetch species. The species can be found in Armenia, Austria, Azerbaijan, Belgium, Bosnia & Herzegovina, Bulgaria, Croatia, Czech Republic, France, Georgia, Germany, Greece, Hungary, Italy, Luxembourg, Netherlands, Norway, Poland, Slovakia, Slovenia, Sweden, Switzerland, Syria, Tajikistan, Turkey, Ukraine, as well as United Kingdom. This plant was also introduced into North America; probably as a forage material for grazing animals. In North America it is mostly restricted to east and southeastern states of USA, in some parts being also an invasive species.

Vicia grandiflora usually grows in a diverse collection of different habitats, which also include some anthropologically modified urban areas. This legume can be found growing on various meadows, in bright forests, on fields and gardens, as well as ruderal landscapes. It rarely grows in mountains, it occurs only at elevations up to 1,800 metres. The plant is a generalist, yet it still prefers warm and sunny growing surfaces.

This species is listed as least concern (LC) species on the IUCN Red list, with its population being rated as stable.

== Gallery ==
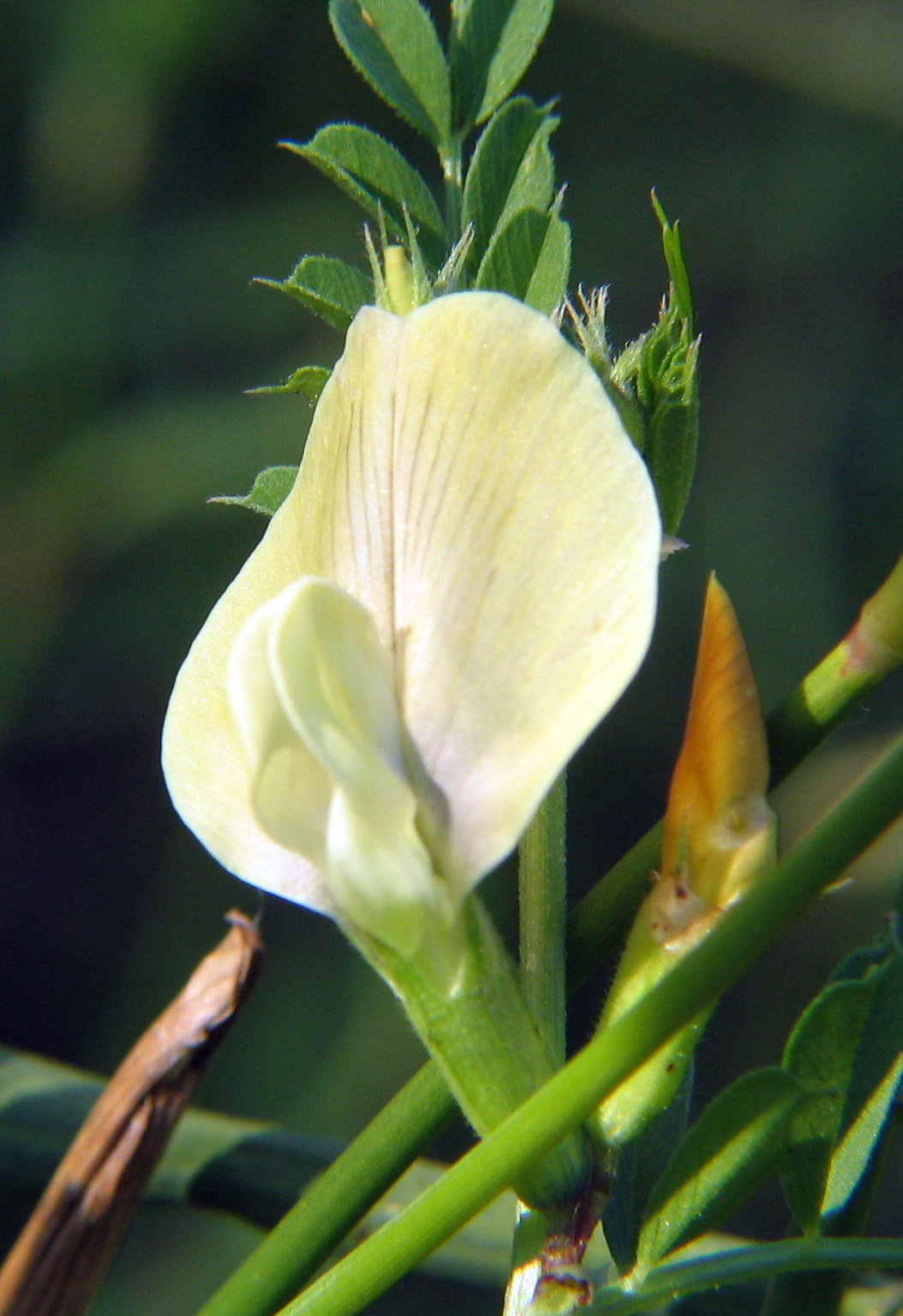

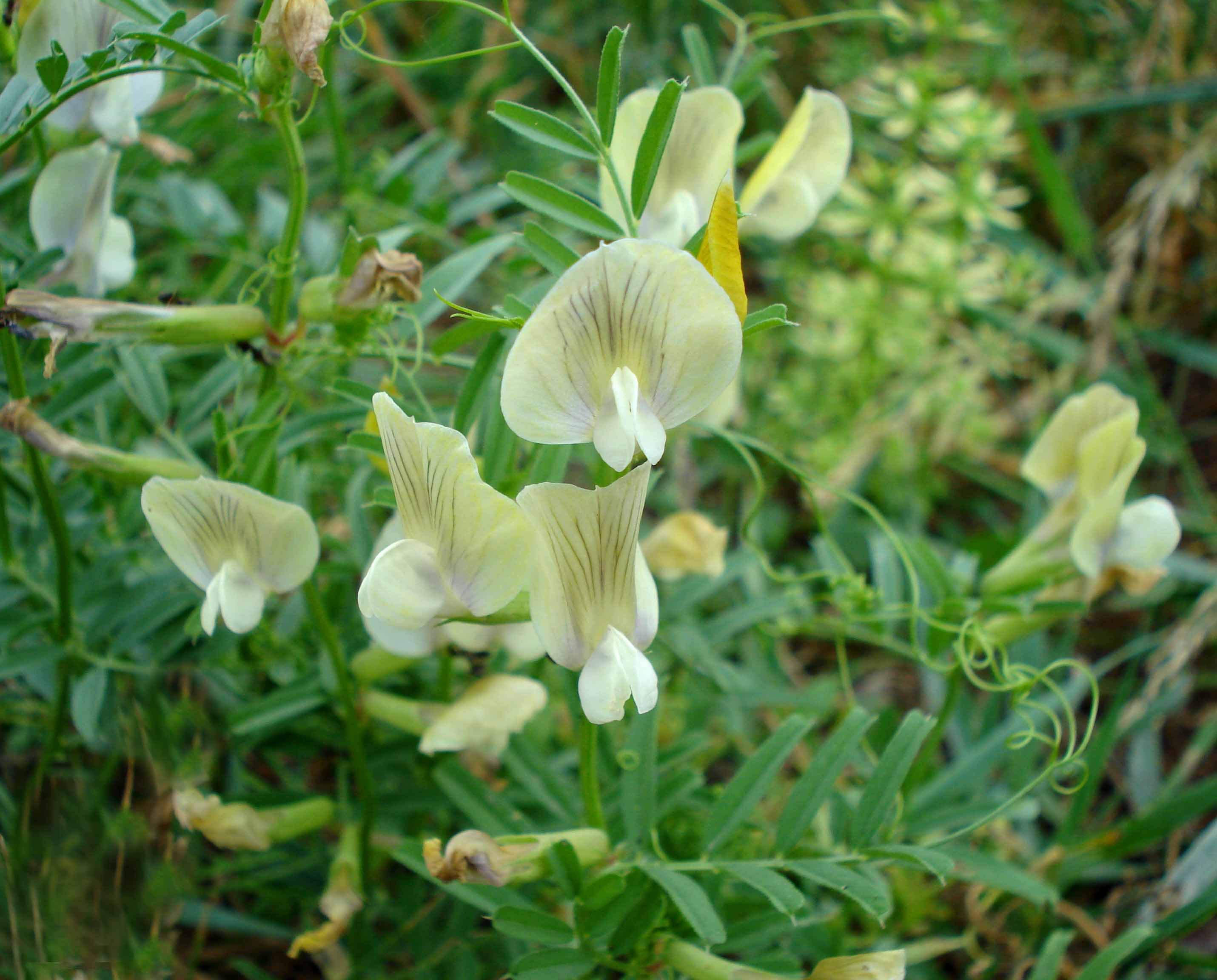

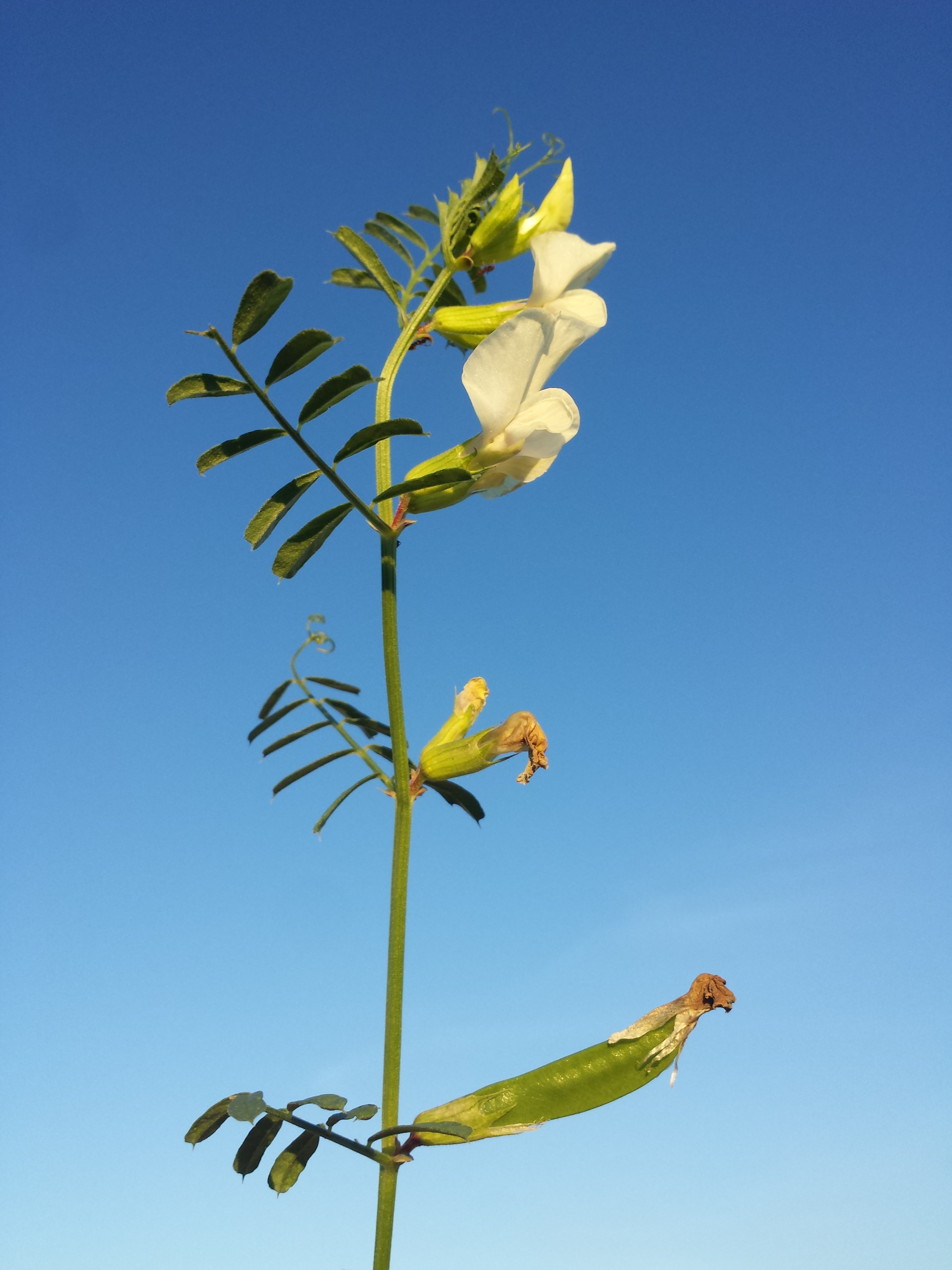

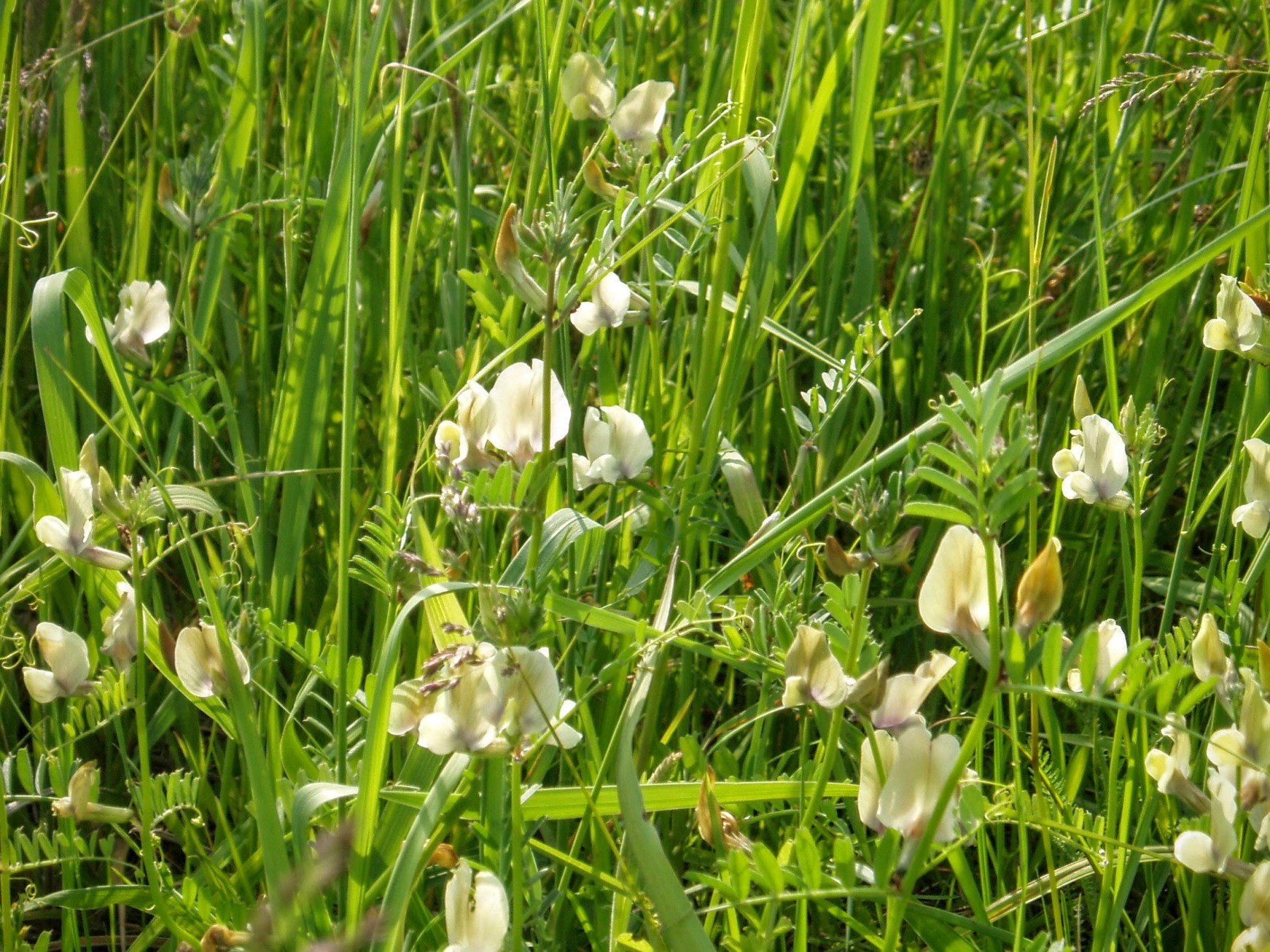

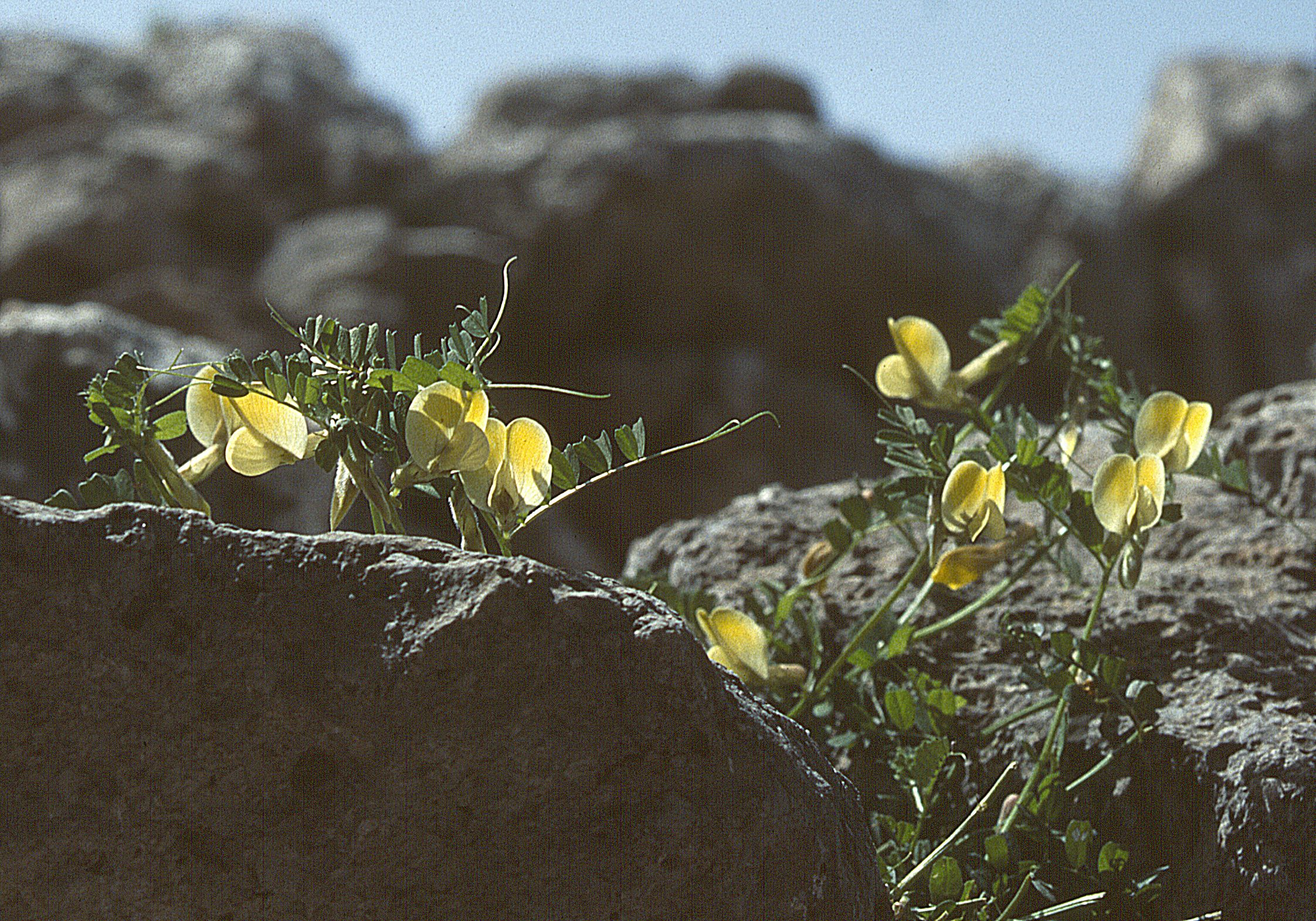

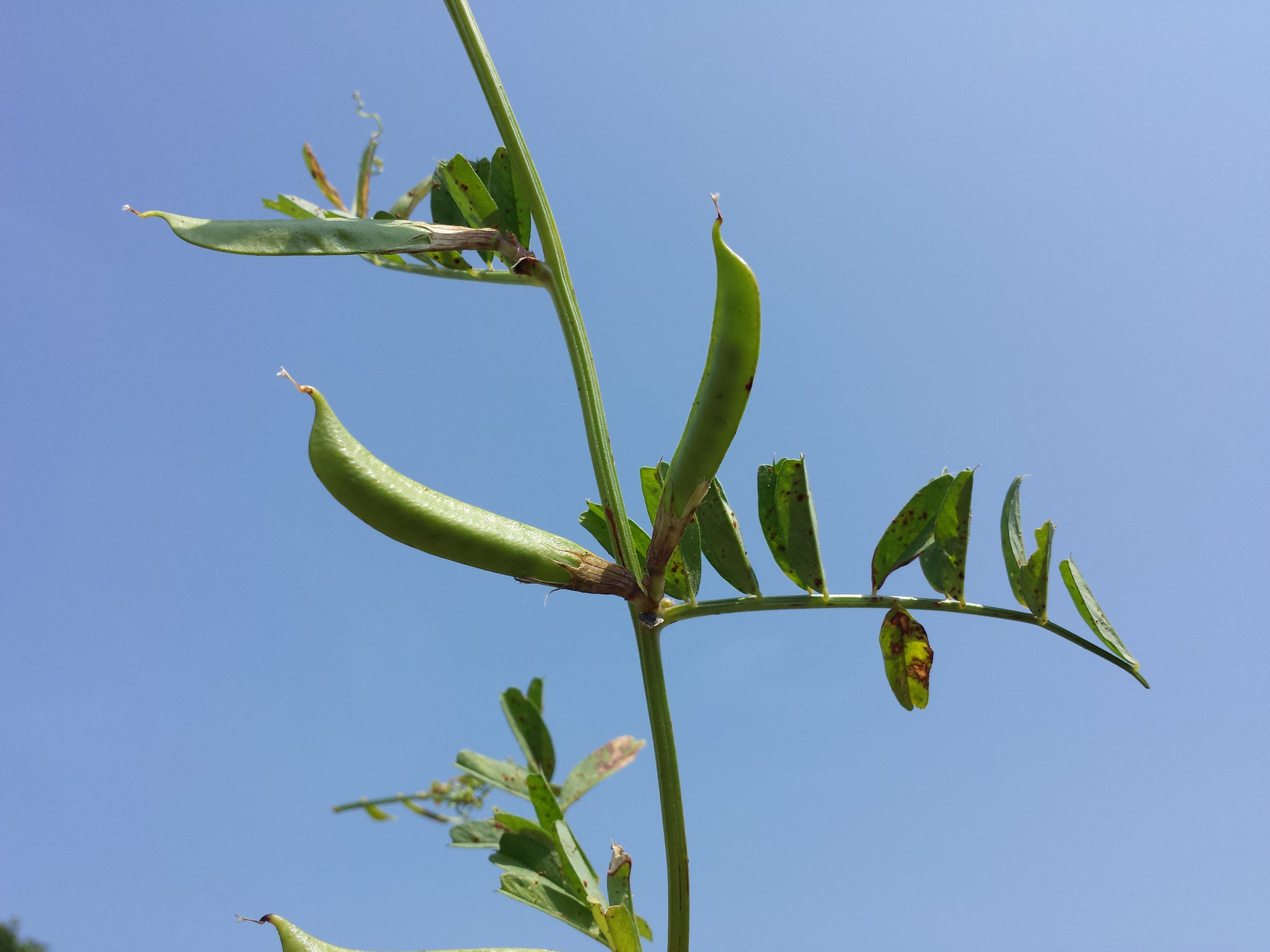

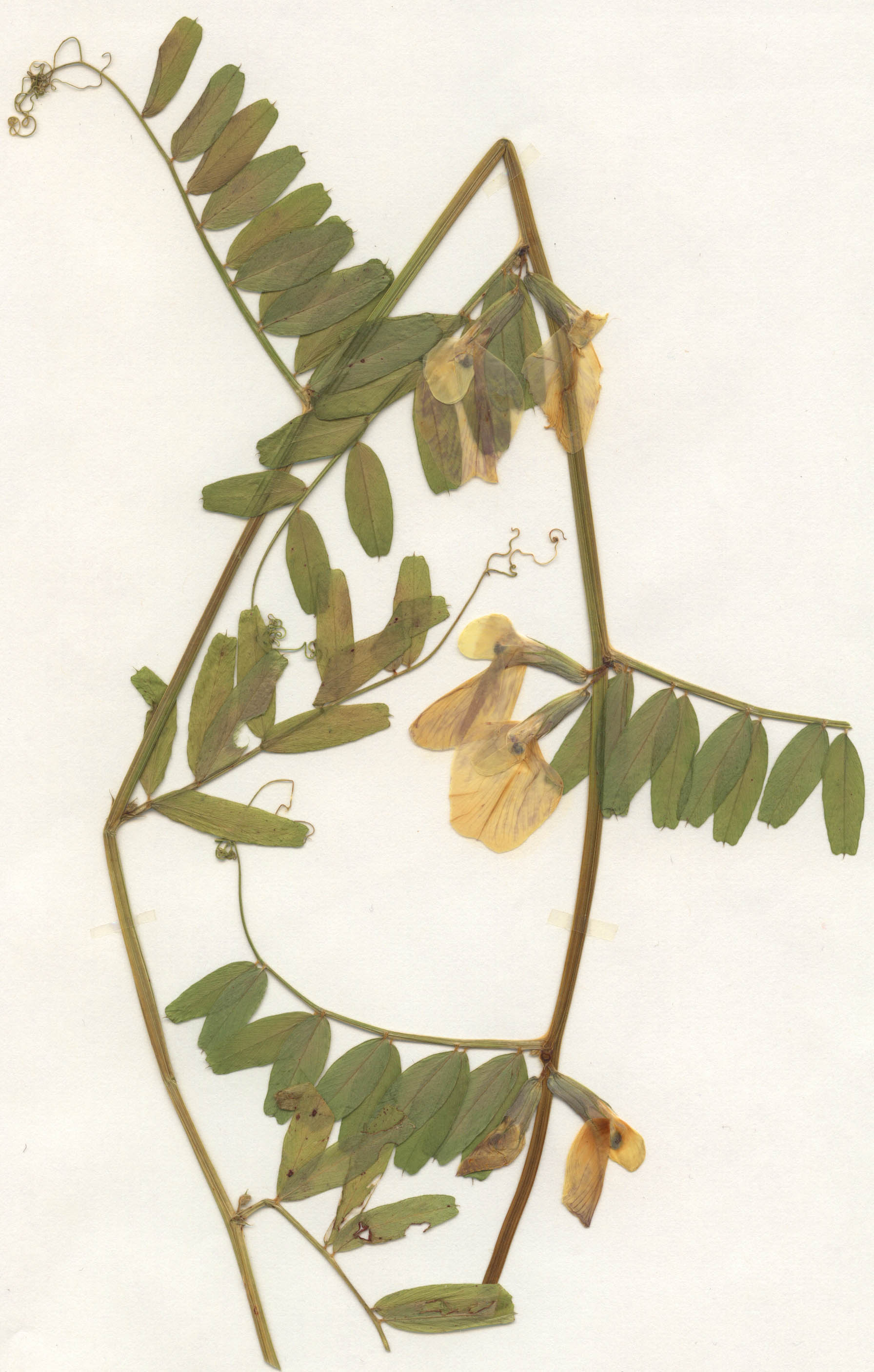

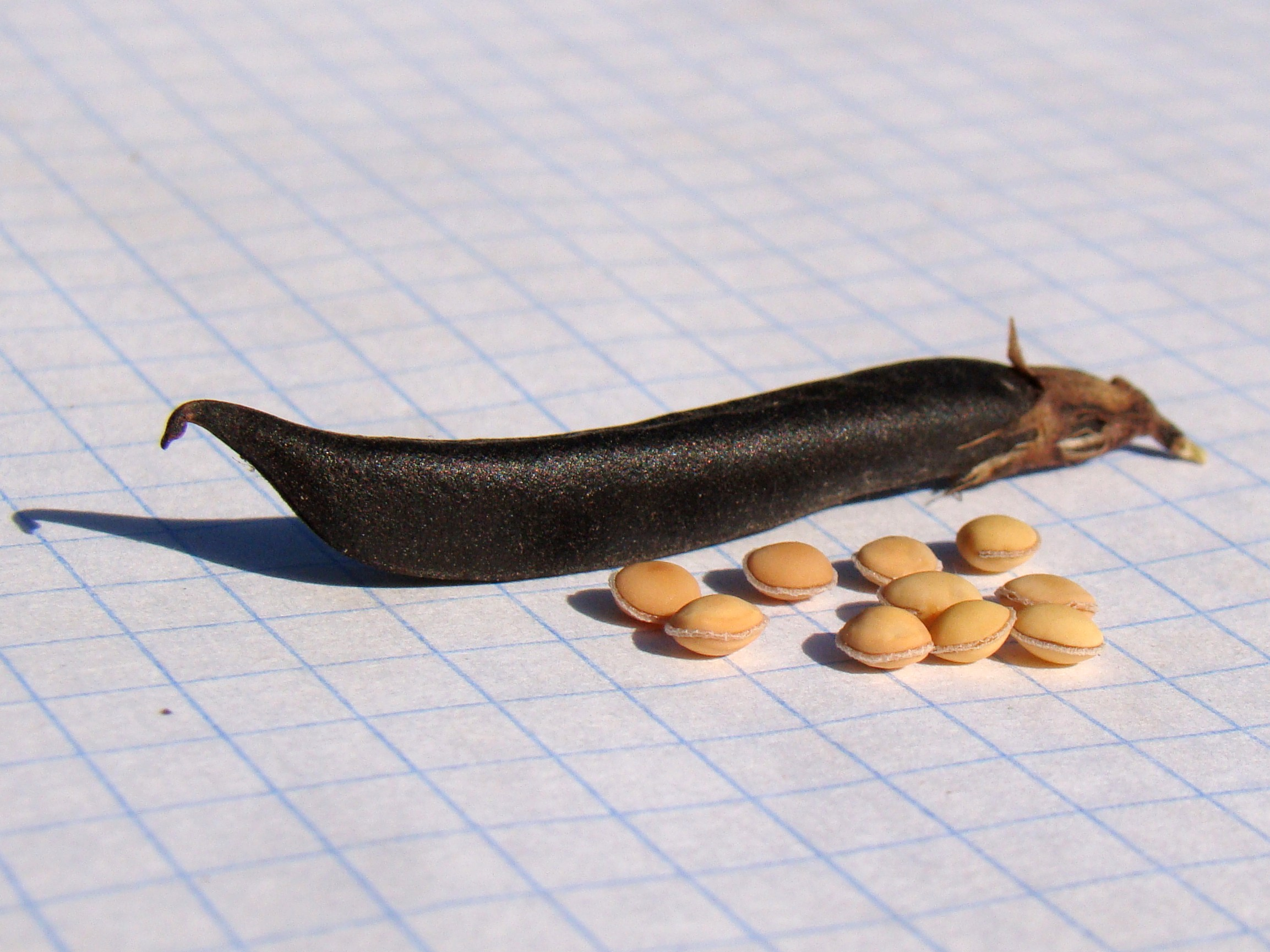

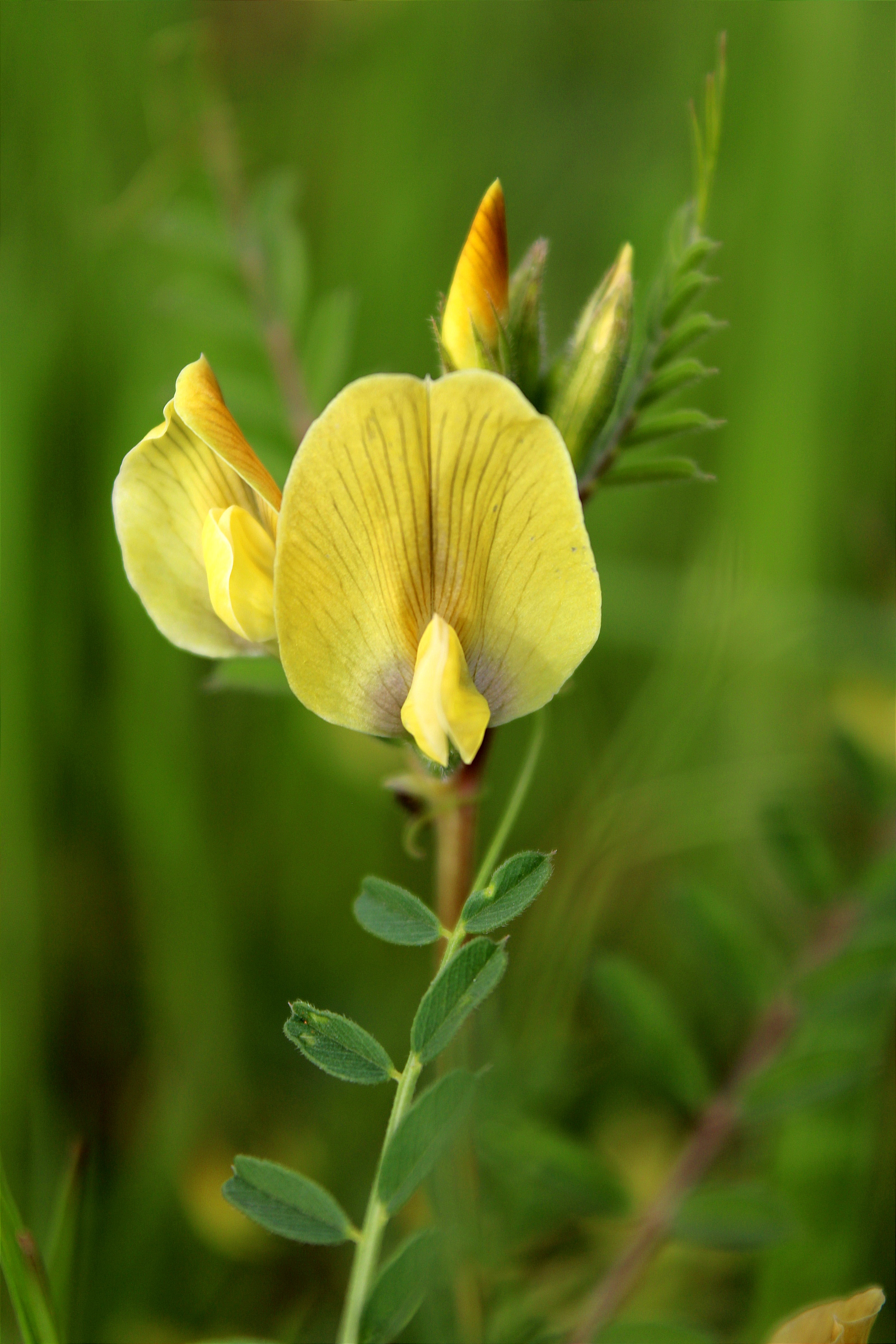
