= 4-Chloroindole-3-acetic acid =

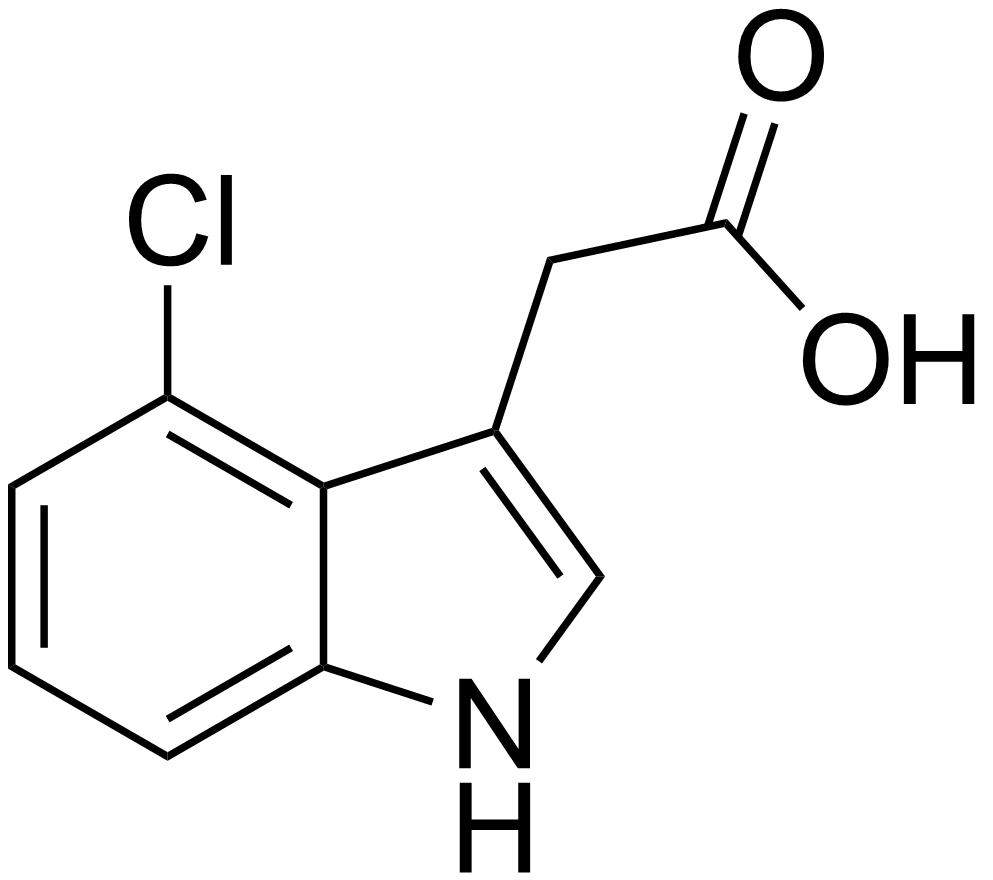

Names
- Preferred IUPAC name (4-Chloro-1H-indol-3-yl)acetic acid
- Other names 2-(4-Chloro-1H-indol-3-yl)acetic acid

Identifiers
CAS Number	2519-61-1
3D model (JSmol)	Interactive image
ChEBI	CHEBI:20339
ChEMBL	ChEMBL309993
ChemSpider	90727
ECHA InfoCard	100.255.860
PubChem CID	100413
UNII	RF78HU5XXV
CompTox Dashboard (EPA)	DTXSID10179857
- InChI: InChI=1S/C10H8ClNO2/c11-7-2-1-3-8-10(7)6(5-12-8)4-9(13)14/h1-3,5,12H,4H2,(H,13,14) Key: WNCFBCKZRJDRKZ-UHFFFAOYSA-N; InChI=1/C10H8ClNO2/c11-7-2-1-3-8-10(7)6(5-12-8)4-9(13)14/h1-3,5,12H,4H2,(H,13,14) Key: WNCFBCKZRJDRKZ-UHFFFAOYAY
- SMILES: Clc1cccc2c1c(c[nH]2)CC(=O)O

Properties
Chemical formula	C_{10}H_{8}ClNO_{2}
Molar mass	209.63 g·mol^{−1}
- Except where otherwise noted, data are given for materials in their standard state (at 25 °C [77 °F], 100 kPa). verify (what is ?) Infobox references

4-Chloroindole-3-acetic acid (4-Cl-IAA) is an organic compound that functions as a plant hormone.

== Synopsis ==
It is a member of the class of compounds known as auxins and a chlorinated analogue of the more common indole-3-acetic acid (IAA) auxin. 4-Cl-IAA is found in the seeds of a variety of plants, particularly legumes such as peas and broad beans. In one study it is written that the substance is "mainly found in reproductive structures" and "is thought to be restricted to members of the leguminous tribe Fabeae, specifically "the genera Vicia, Pisum, Lathyrus, Lens, and Vavilovia". In Pisum sativum, 4-Cl-IAA biosynthesis diverges from IAA biosynthesis when the amino acid tryptophan is chlorinated to form 4-chlorotryptophan (4-Cl-Trp); the biosynthesis of 4-Cl-IAA then precedes parallel to that of IAA.

Engvild hypothesized in 1996 that 4-Cl-IAA may be a "death hormone" that maturing seeds use to trigger death of the parent plant by mobilizing nutrients to be stored in the seed.

Lam et al found the substance in the seeds of Medicago truncatula, Melilotus indicus, and three species of Trifolium.
