= V. lutea =

V. lutea may refer to:

- Vicia lutea, an annual herb
- Vigna lutea, a creeping vine
- Vinca lutea, a North American vine
- Viola lutea, a European violet
