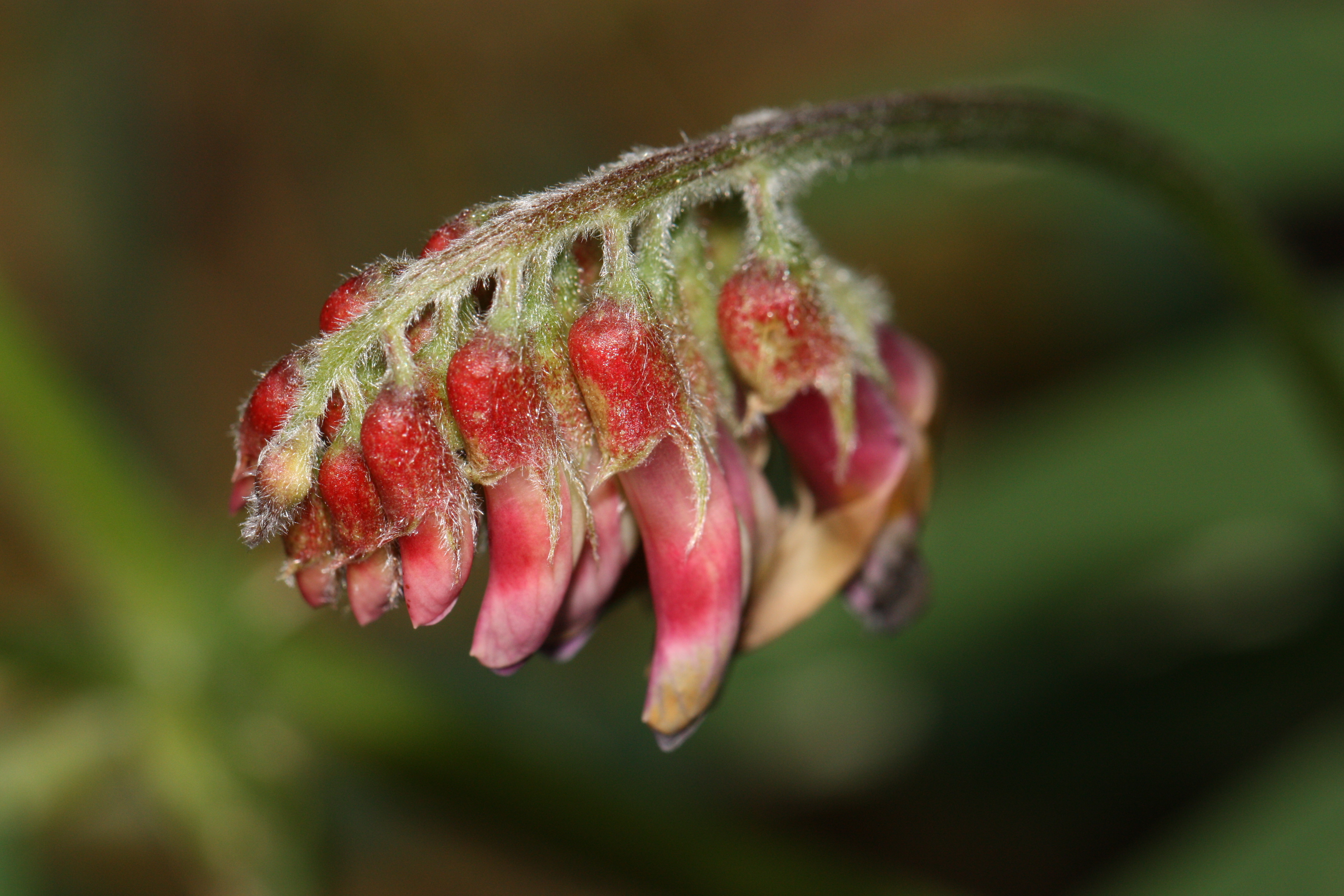
- ssp. gigantea

Scientific classification
- Kingdom: Plantae
- Clade: Tracheophytes
- Clade: Angiosperms
- Clade: Eudicots
- Clade: Rosids
- Order: Fabales
- Family: Fabaceae
- Subfamily: Faboideae
- Tribe: Fabeae
- Genus: Vicia
- Species: V. nigricans

Binomial name
- Vicia nigricans Hook. & Arn.

Synonyms
- Vicia gigantea Hook. (non Bunge)

= Vicia nigricans =

Species of legume

Vicia nigricans is a species of vetch known by the common name black vetch. It has a disjunct distribution, its two subspecies divided by thousands of miles in range.

== Subspecies ==
Image	Subspecies	Distribution
	Vicia nigricans subsp. gigantea (Hook.) S.L. Broich giant vetch	western North America from Alaska to northern California, where it occurs in coastal and moist inland habitat and disturbed areas.
	Vicia nigricans subsp. nigricans	southern South America, in Argentina and Chile.

== Description ==
This vetch is a perennial herb with stout, hollow, and ridged climbing stems that may reach two meters in length. It attaches to objects and other plants by its large branched tendrils for support. The leaves are made up of 9 to 13 pairs of lance-shaped or elongated oval leaflets that may measure up to 4 centimeters in length. The inflorescence is a one-sided raceme of up to 15 or 20 flowers which have pale pink to dark reddish purple or sometimes yellowish to orange corollas. The flowers, each with a calyx about half as long as the corolla, are 1 to 2 centimeters long. They yield fruits which are legume pods measuring up to 4 centimeters long by 1.5 wide. As they dry they turn black.
