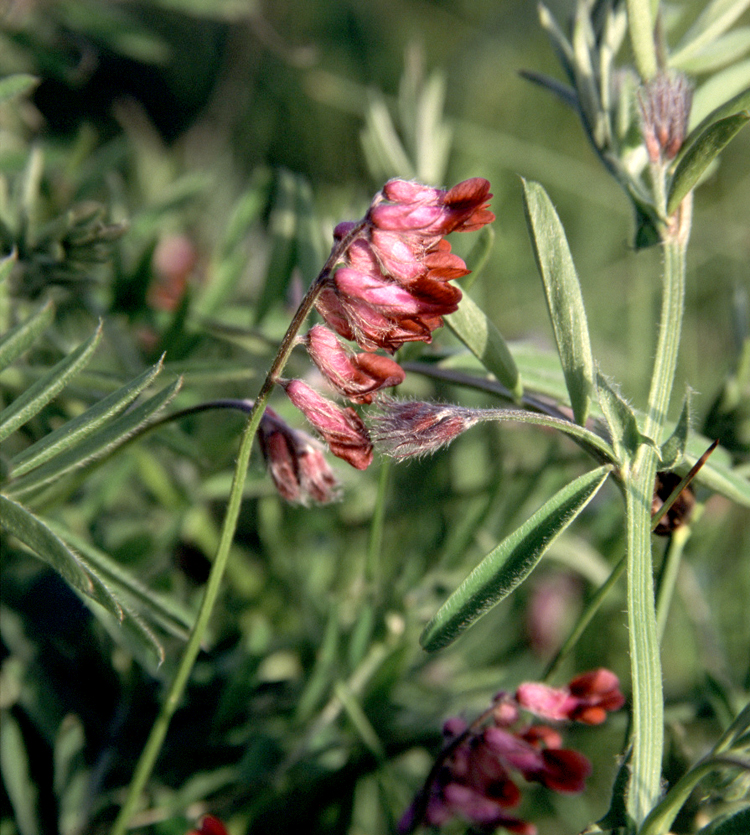

Scientific classification
- Kingdom: Plantae
- Clade: Tracheophytes
- Clade: Angiosperms
- Clade: Eudicots
- Clade: Rosids
- Order: Fabales
- Family: Fabaceae
- Subfamily: Faboideae
- Tribe: Fabeae
- Genus: Vicia
- Species: V. benghalensis

Binomial name
- Vicia benghalensis L.

Synonyms
- Vicia atropurpurea

= Vicia benghalensis =

Species of legume

Vicia benghalensis is a species of vetch known by the common names purple vetch and reddish tufted vetch. It is native to southern Europe, North Africa, and nearby islands, and it is utilized elsewhere in agriculture and may be present in the wild as an introduced species. It is an annual herb with a climbing stem which is coated in hairs, often densely, making the plant appear silvery white. Each leaf is made up of several pairs of elongated leaflets which measure up to 3 centimeters in length. The inflorescence is a one-side raceme of several dark reddish purple flowers. Each flower has a densely hairy calyx of sepals and a tubular corolla between one and two centimeters in length. The fruit is a flat, hairy legume pod up to 3.5 centimeters long containing multiple seeds.

This plant is used as a cover crop and green manure for the purposes of soil improvement and weed and pest control. It is used in crop rotation, for hay and fodder, and as a honey plant, and it has a very high biomass yield. Purple vetch seeds and forage have been reported to cause poisoning in humans and in livestock, so caution is required when feeding them.
