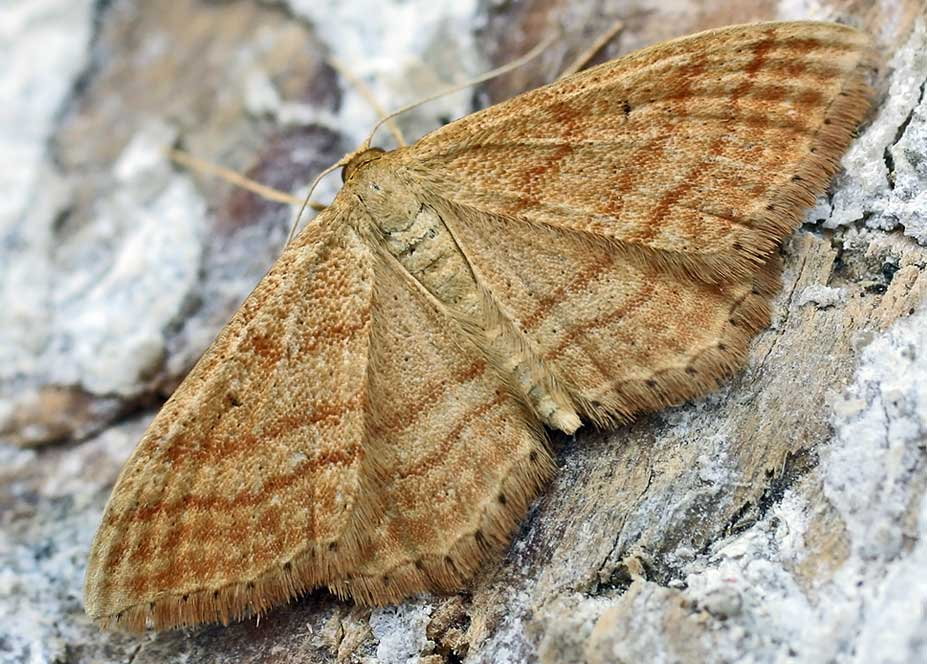

Scientific classification
- Kingdom: Animalia
- Phylum: Arthropoda
- Clade: Pancrustacea
- Class: Insecta
- Order: Lepidoptera
- Family: Geometridae
- Genus: Idaea
- Species: I. ochrata

Binomial name
- Idaea ochrata (Scopoli, 1763)

= Idaea ochrata =

Bright wave

Species of moth

Idaea ochrata, the bright wave, is a moth of the family Geometridae. It is found in Europe.

The species has a wingspan of 21–24 mm. The adults fly at night from late June to early August in one generation. The species overwinters as a larva.

The larvae feed on the flowers of hawk's beard (Crepis sp.), dandelion (Taraxacum) and coltsfoot (Tussaligo) in captivity. In the wild the larvae feed on Smooth Tare and the flowers of Hare's-foot Clover.

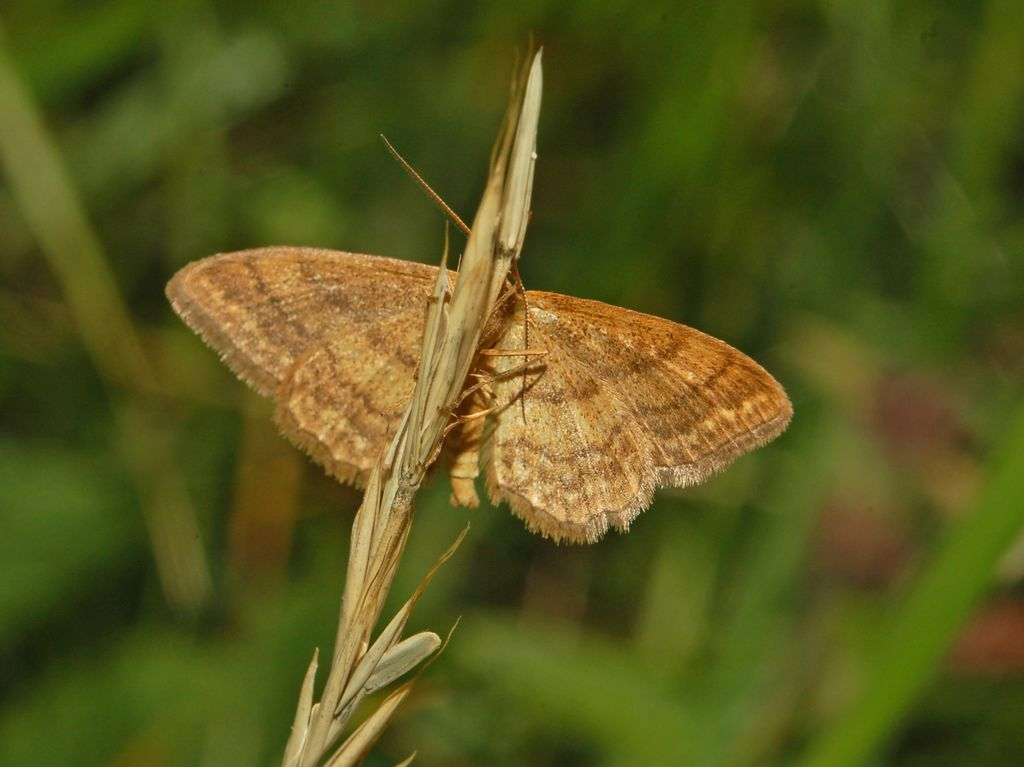
Ventral view

1. The flight season refers to the British Isles. This may vary in other parts of the range.
