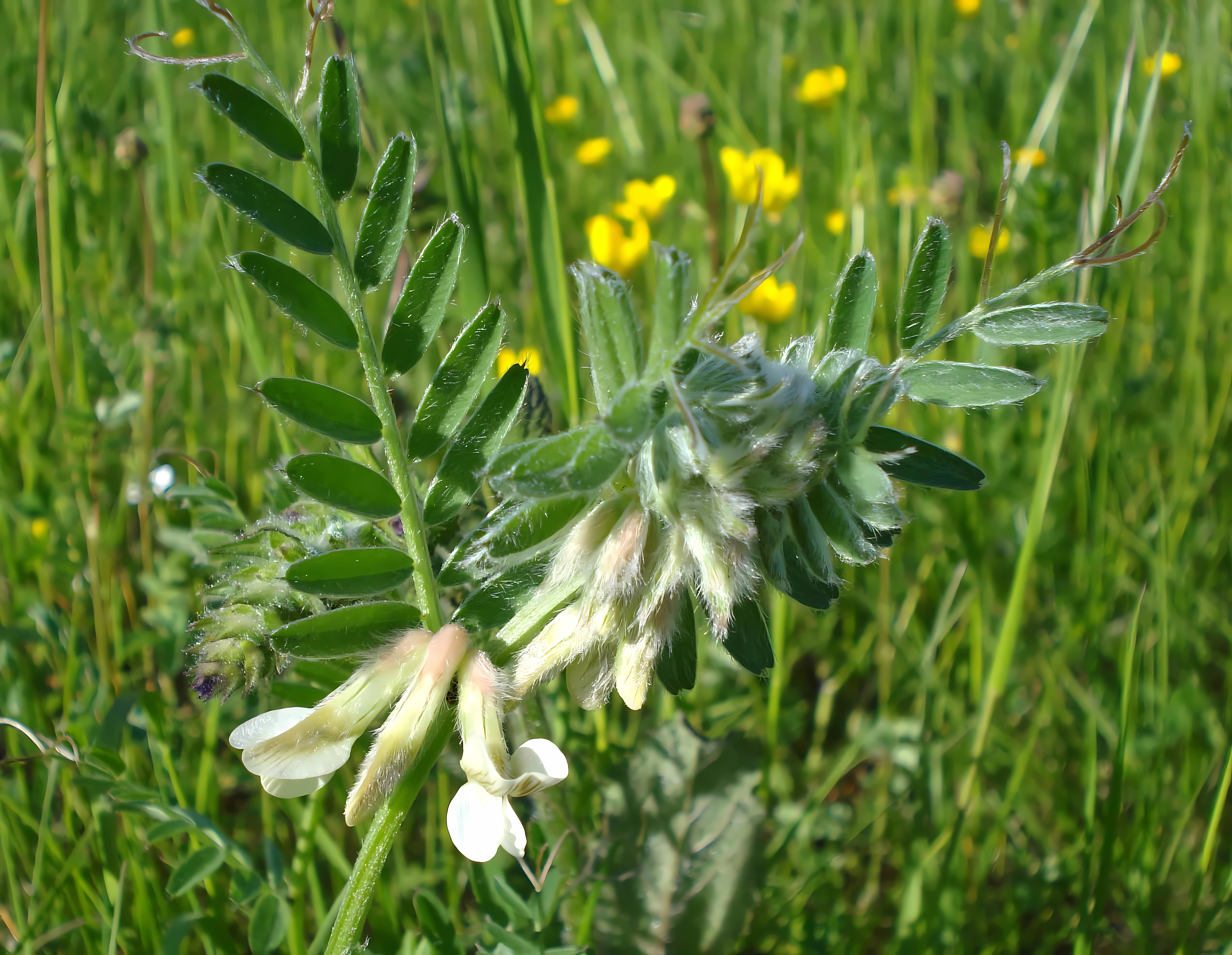

Scientific classification
- Kingdom: Plantae
- Clade: Tracheophytes
- Clade: Angiosperms
- Clade: Eudicots
- Clade: Rosids
- Order: Fabales
- Family: Fabaceae
- Subfamily: Faboideae
- Tribe: Fabeae
- Genus: Vicia
- Species: V. pannonica

Binomial name
- Vicia pannonica Crantz

= Vicia pannonica =

Species of legume

Vicia pannonica is a species of vetch known by the common name Hungarian vetch. It is native to southern, central Europe and western Asia, and it is sometimes cultivated as an agricultural crop for use as hay and fodder. It may escape cultivation and grow as a casual roadside weed.

== Description ==
This is an annual herb producing a hairy, climbing stem supported by the tendrils on its leaf-tips. The leaves are each made up of 10 to 20 oval or oblong leaflets measuring up to 2.5 centimeters in length. The inflorescence bears two to four pealike flowers each up to 2 centimeters long. The flower corolla is yellow or purple-marked and the back of the banner (the large top petal) is coated in soft hairs. The fruit is a hairy legume pod 2 to 3 centimeters long.
