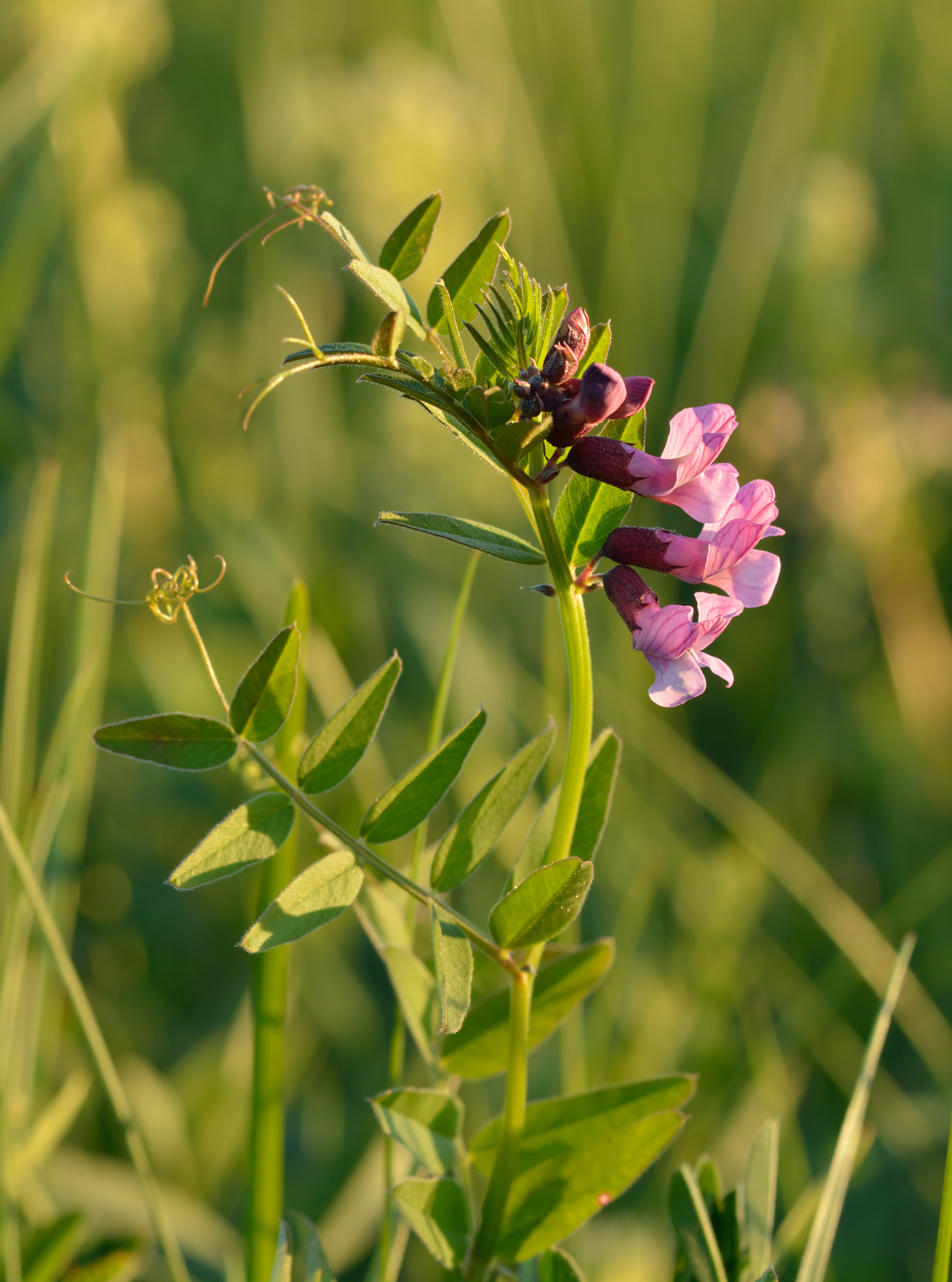

Scientific classification
- Kingdom: Plantae
- Clade: Tracheophytes
- Clade: Angiosperms
- Clade: Eudicots
- Clade: Rosids
- Order: Fabales
- Family: Fabaceae
- Subfamily: Faboideae
- Tribe: Fabeae
- Genus: Vicia
- Species: V. sepium

Binomial name
- Vicia sepium L.

= Vicia sepium =

Species of legume

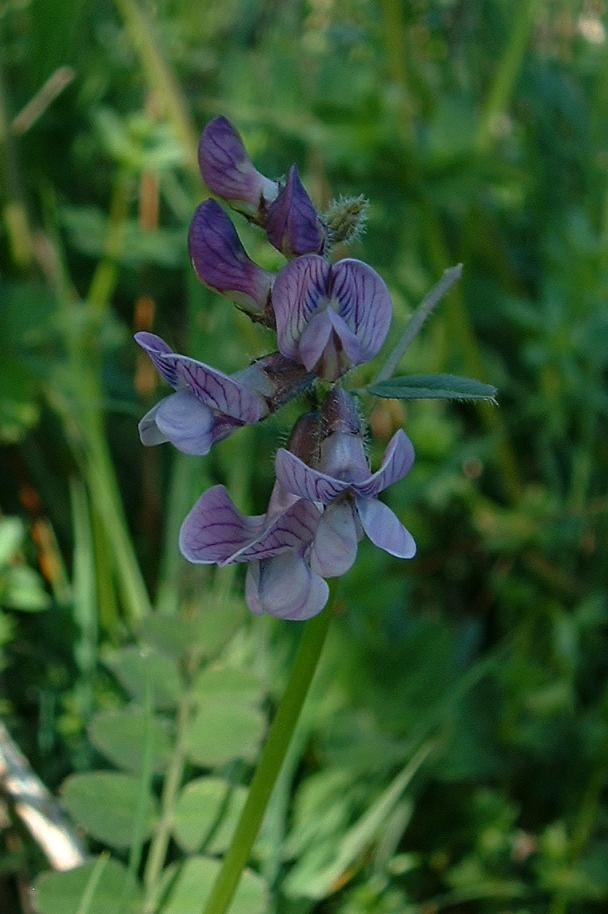

Vicia sepium or bush vetch is a species of flowering plant in the pea and bean family Fabaceae. A nitrogen-fixing, perennial, leguminous climbing plant that grows in hedgerows, grasslands, the edges of woodland, roadsides and rough ground. It occurs in western Europe, Crimea of Ukraine, Russia including Siberia, Caucasus and Central Asia. It can also be found in eastern Canada, north-eastern states of the USA and, where suitable habitat occurs, in Greenland. It is native to, and has been recorded in, almost all parts of Britain, Ireland and associated islands.

== Description ==
A rhizomatous plant. Its climbing habit is enabled by branched tendrils at the end of each leaf stem, which curl around surrounding plants. The stems are not branched, are almost glabrous, sometimes with rare soft hairs, single, mostly 30 to 40 cm long but sometimes as much as 100 cm. The leaves are compound and pinnate with 4 to 8 pairs of opposite leaflets ending in branched tendrils. Leaflets are 20 to 30 mm long, 8 to 10 mm wide, elongated elliptical in form with broad bases and glabrous at both sides. Flower stalks are very short with 2 to 6 almost sessile flowers on each. Flowers are 12 to 15 mm long, reddish-lilac or lilac-blue. Similar in appearance to common vetch (Vicia sativa) but each stem of the latter has more flowers, and bush vetch is usually hairless whereas V. sativa is slightly hairy.

Flowers between May and August, occasionally into November. Mainly cross pollinated by insects. The resultant pods or legumes ripen mainly during July to August, are 30 to 40 mm long, 6 to 8 mm wide, elongated, rhomboid and black in colour. The seeds within are black or brown.

It is a forage crop with nutritional value, characterized by seed productivity in less favorable years. It can be used for hay or silage, particularly arable silage from perennial grass-vetch mixtures.

Bush vetch supports a variety of generalist legume feeders including beetles, weevils and caterpillars. Bumblebees and honeybees seek out the flowers for their nectar.

== Ecology ==
Hedges and grass thickets.
