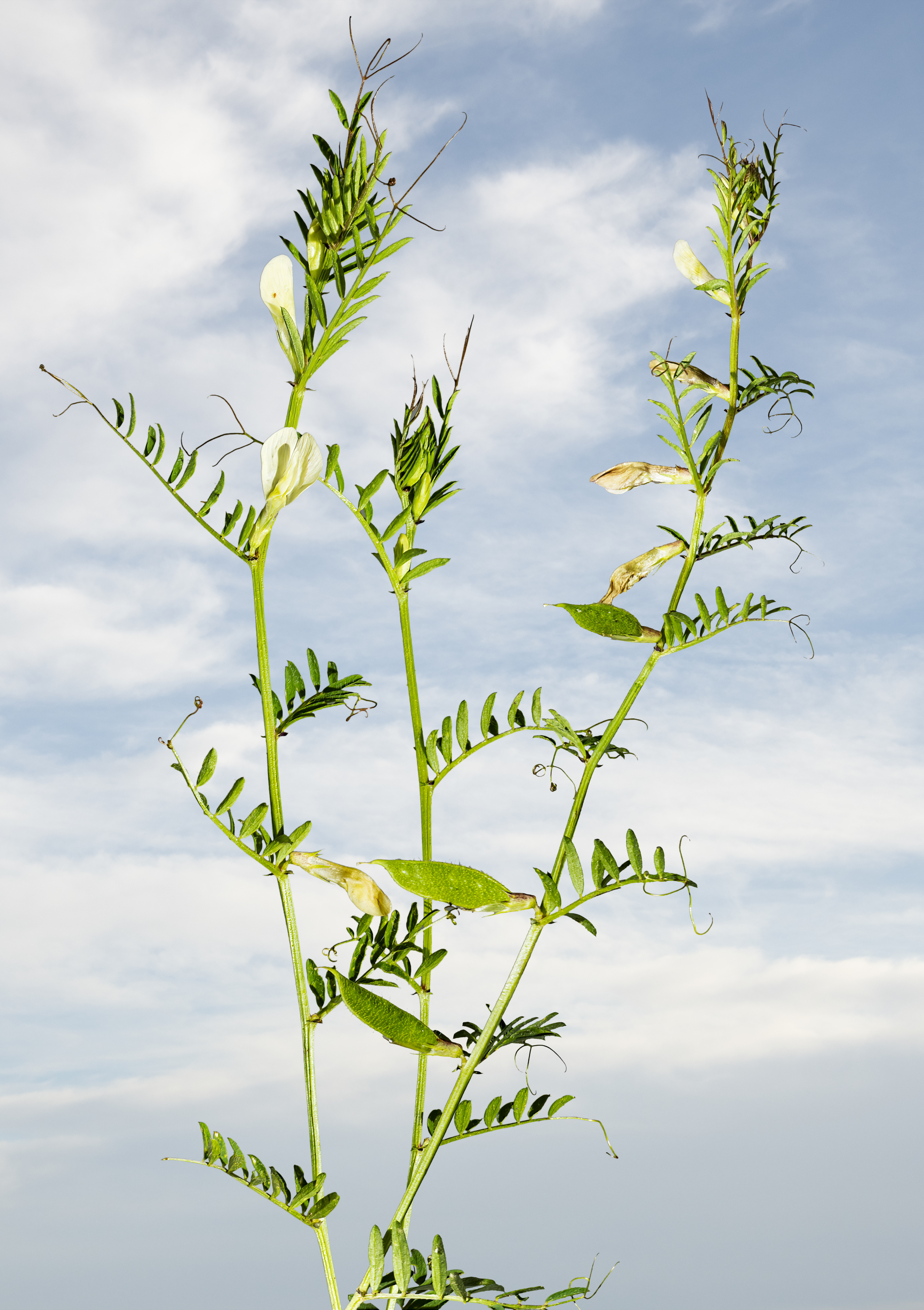

Conservation status
- Least Concern (IUCN 3.1)

Scientific classification
- Kingdom: Plantae
- Clade: Tracheophytes
- Clade: Angiosperms
- Clade: Eudicots
- Clade: Rosids
- Order: Fabales
- Family: Fabaceae
- Subfamily: Faboideae
- Tribe: Fabeae
- Genus: Vicia
- Species: V. lutea

Binomial name
- Vicia lutea L.

= Vicia lutea =

Species of flowering plant in the bean family

Vicia lutea (yellow vetch, smooth yellow vetch) is a species of flowering plant in the bean family Fabaceae.

== Distribution ==
It is native to Europe, western Asia, and North Africa, and it is known on other continents as an introduced species.

== Description ==
It is an annual herb. It has leaves made up of several pairs of oblong or linear leaflets each 1 to 2 centimeters long. It produces solitary flowers or clusters of up to 3 flowers with yellow or purple-tinged corollas up to 3 centimeters in length.

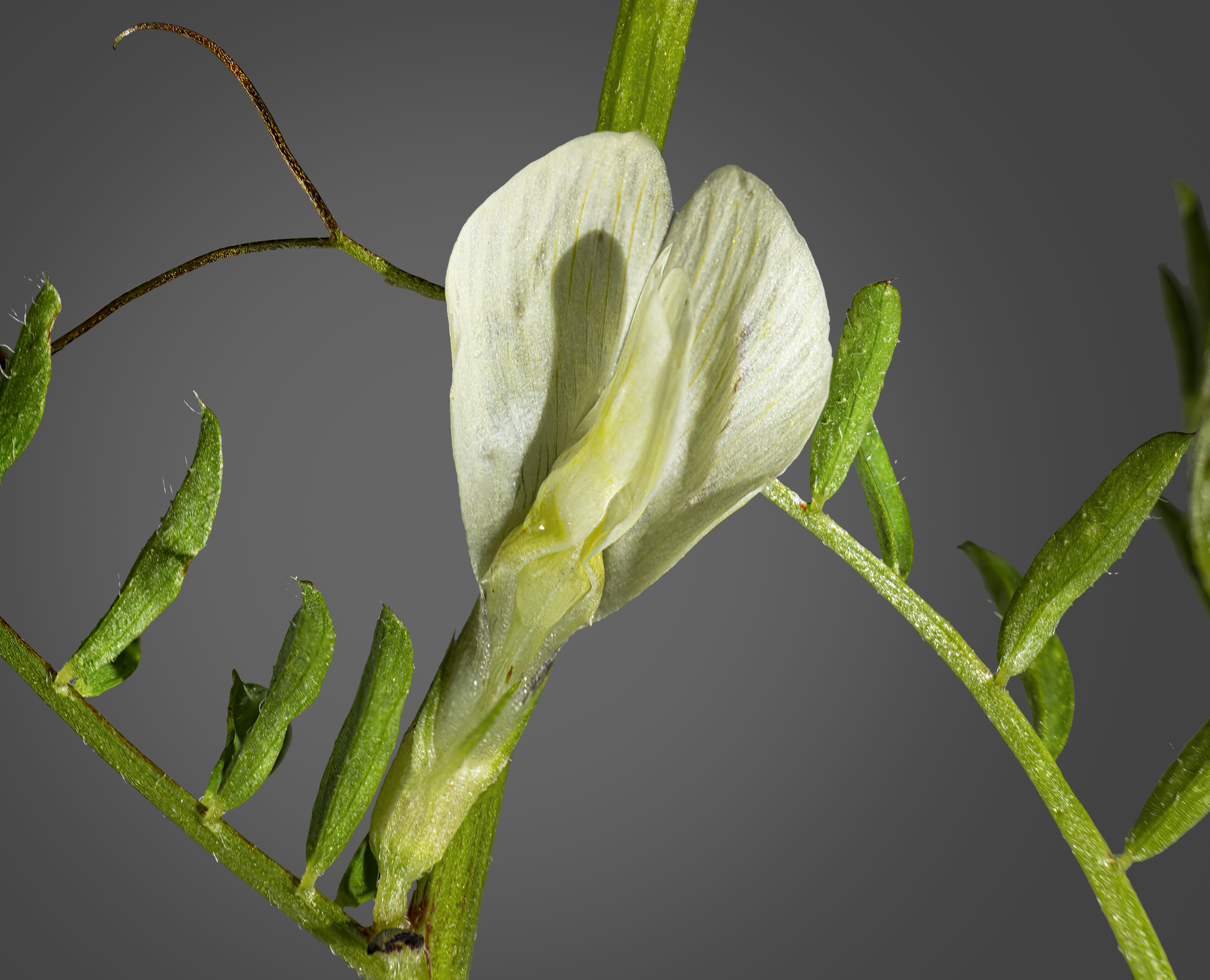
Flower

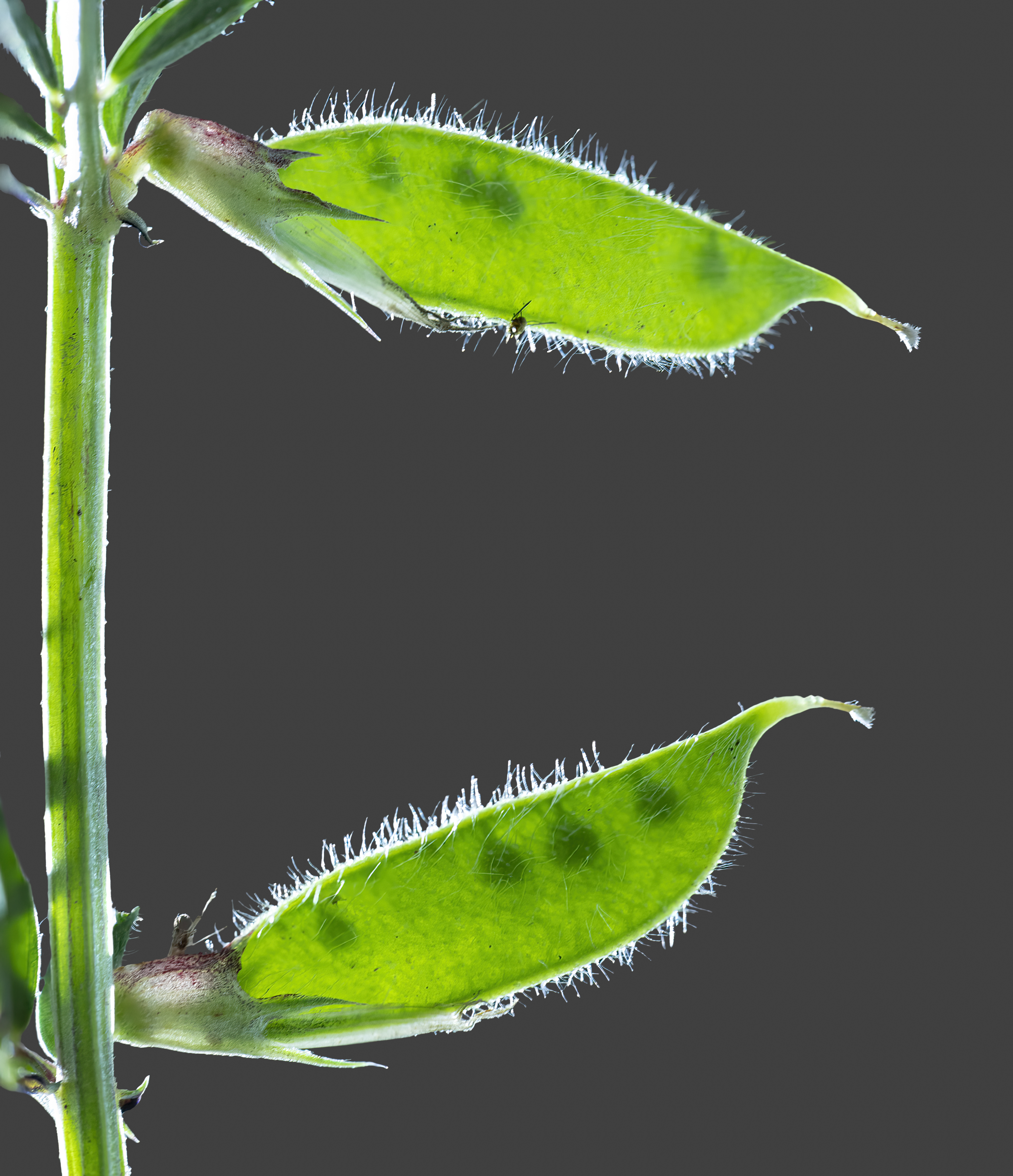
Immature fruits
