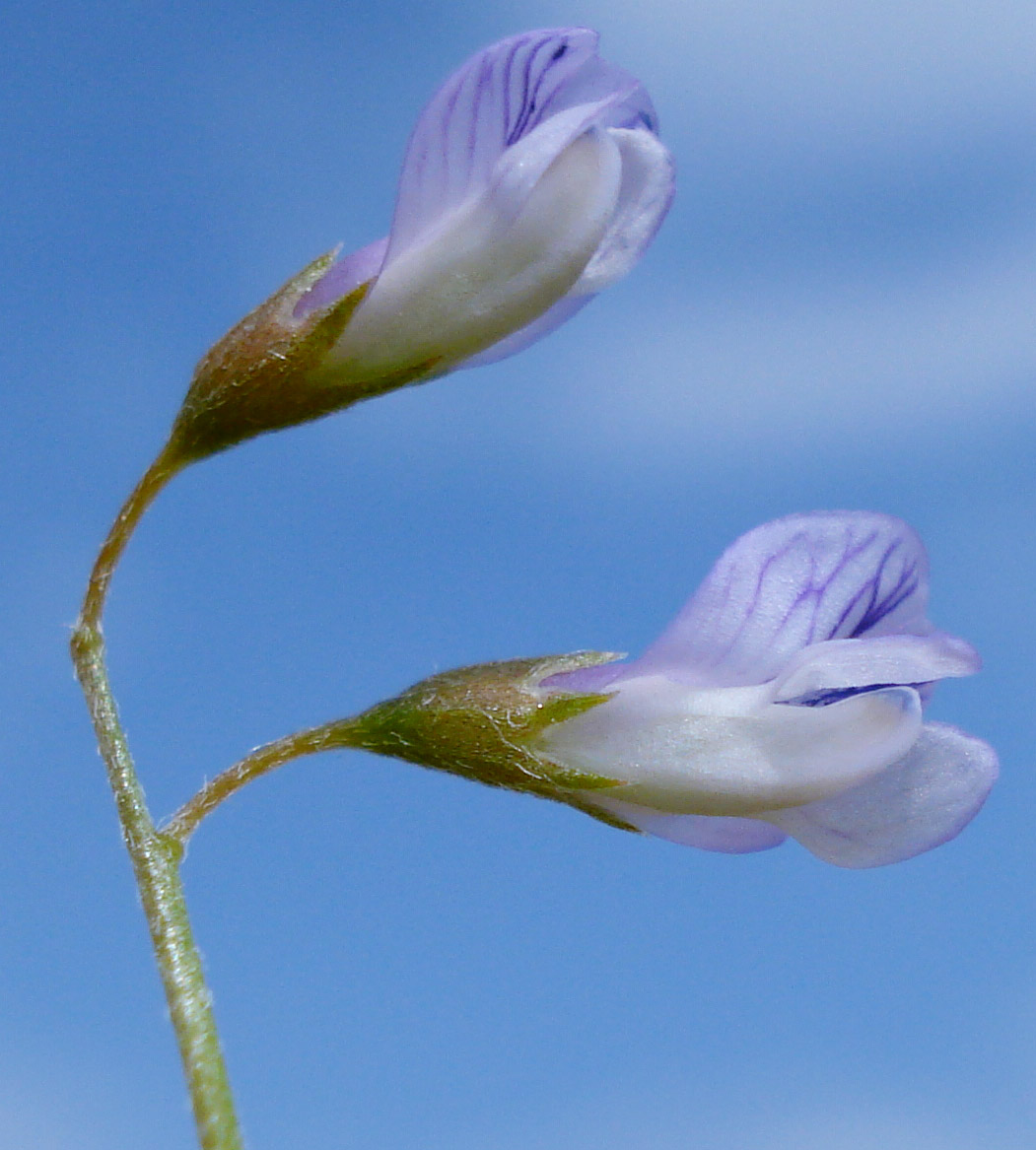

Scientific classification
- Kingdom: Plantae
- Clade: Tracheophytes
- Clade: Angiosperms
- Clade: Eudicots
- Clade: Rosids
- Order: Fabales
- Family: Fabaceae
- Subfamily: Faboideae
- Tribe: Fabeae
- Genus: Vicia
- Species: V. tetrasperma

Binomial name
- Vicia tetrasperma (L.) Schreb.

Synonyms
- Vicia tetrasperma (L.) Moench; Ervum tetraspermum L.

= Vicia tetrasperma =

Species of legume

Vicia tetrasperma (syn. Ervum tetraspermum) the smooth tare, smooth vetch, lentil vetch or sparrow vetch, is a species of flowering plant in the bean family Fabaceae.

== Description ==
Vicia tetrasperma is an annual plant growing up to 60 cm (24 in) tall. The leaflets are 10 to 20 mm (0.39 to 0.79 in) and are in four to six pairs, the leaf ending with a simple tendril. The pale blue flowers are in racemes of one or two flowers, each about 4 mm (0.16 in) long. Four seeds are produced in a pod 12 to 15 mm (0.47 to 0.59 in) long. The pod is dehiscent.

== Distribution ==
This vetch is native to Europe, Asia, and North Africa, and it can be found on other continents as an introduced species. It can be invasive.

== Habitat ==
Grassy places, local.
