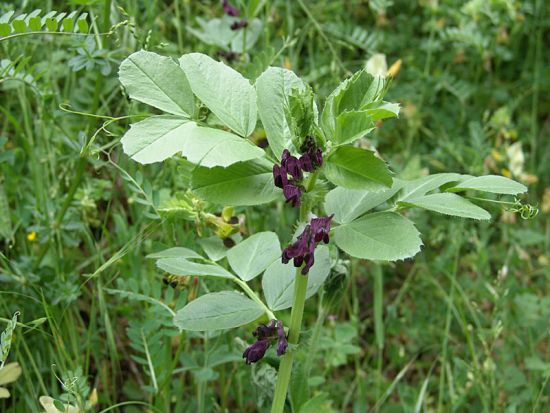
- In bloom

Conservation status
- Least Concern (IUCN 3.1)

Scientific classification
- Kingdom: Plantae
- Clade: Tracheophytes
- Clade: Angiosperms
- Clade: Eudicots
- Clade: Rosids
- Order: Fabales
- Family: Fabaceae
- Subfamily: Faboideae
- Genus: Vicia
- Species: V. narbonensis

Binomial name
- Vicia narbonensis L.

Synonyms
- List: Bona narbonensis (L.) Medik.; Bona speciosa Medik.; Faba bona Medik.; Faba bona subsp. minuta (Alef.) Soják; Faba narbonensis (L.) Schur; Faba serratifolia Fuss; Vicia heterophylla Rchb.; Vicia latifolia Moench; Vicia monadelpha Roth; Vicia narbonensis var. jordanica H.I.Schäf.; Vicia narbonensis var. salmonea (Mouterde) H.I.Schäf.; Vicia pauciflora Formánek; Vicia platycarpos Roth

= Vicia narbonensis =

Species of flowering plant

Vicia narbonensis, called Narbon bean, Narbon vetch, Narbonne vetch and moor's pea, is a widely distributed species of flowering plant in the family Fabaceae. It is native to Madeira and the Mediterranean countries through to Central Asia and the western Himalayas, and has been introduced to central and eastern Europe, and scattered other locations. It has some palatability issues, but has potential as a green manure and forage crop, and for its beans. It is the namesake of the Vicia narbonensis species complex.
