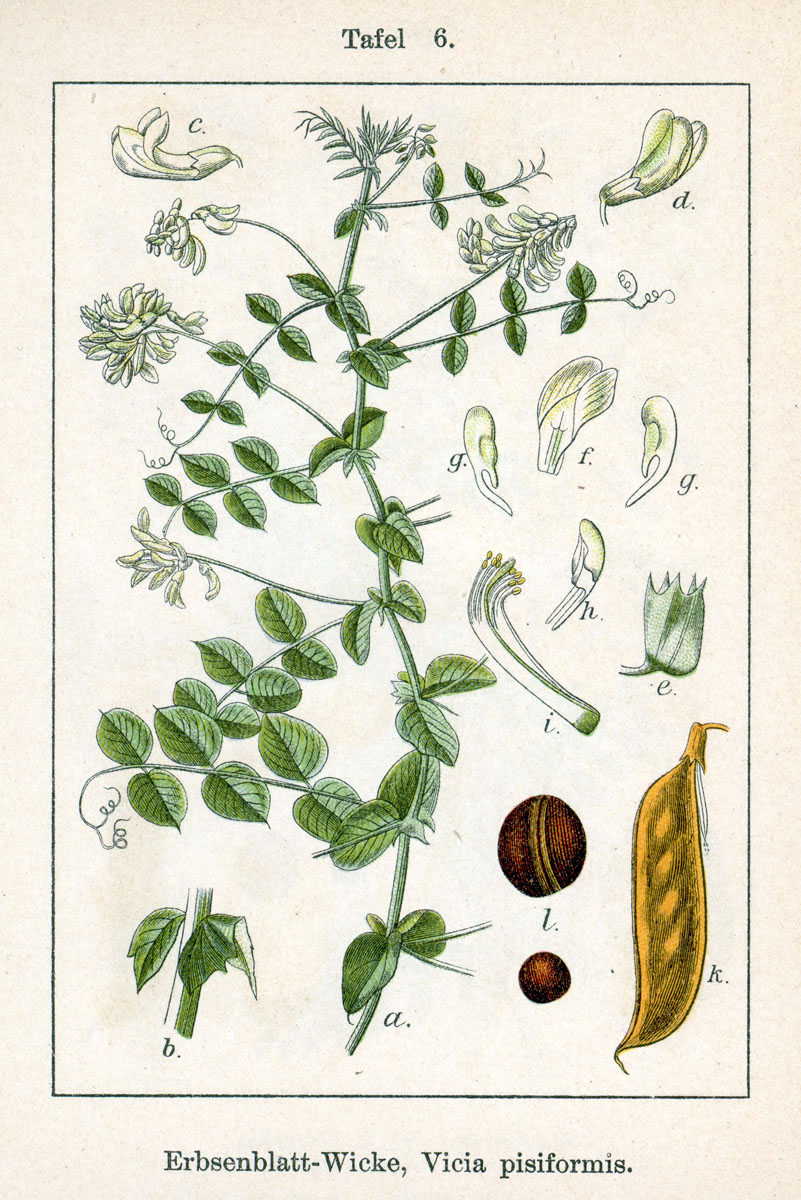

Scientific classification
- Kingdom: Plantae
- Clade: Tracheophytes
- Clade: Angiosperms
- Clade: Eudicots
- Clade: Rosids
- Order: Fabales
- Family: Fabaceae
- Subfamily: Faboideae
- Genus: Vicia
- Species: V. pisiformis

Binomial name
- Vicia pisiformis L.

= Vicia pisiformis =

Species of legume

Vicia pisiformis is a species of flowering plant belonging to the family Fabaceae.

Its native range is Europe to Western Siberia, and Caucasus.
