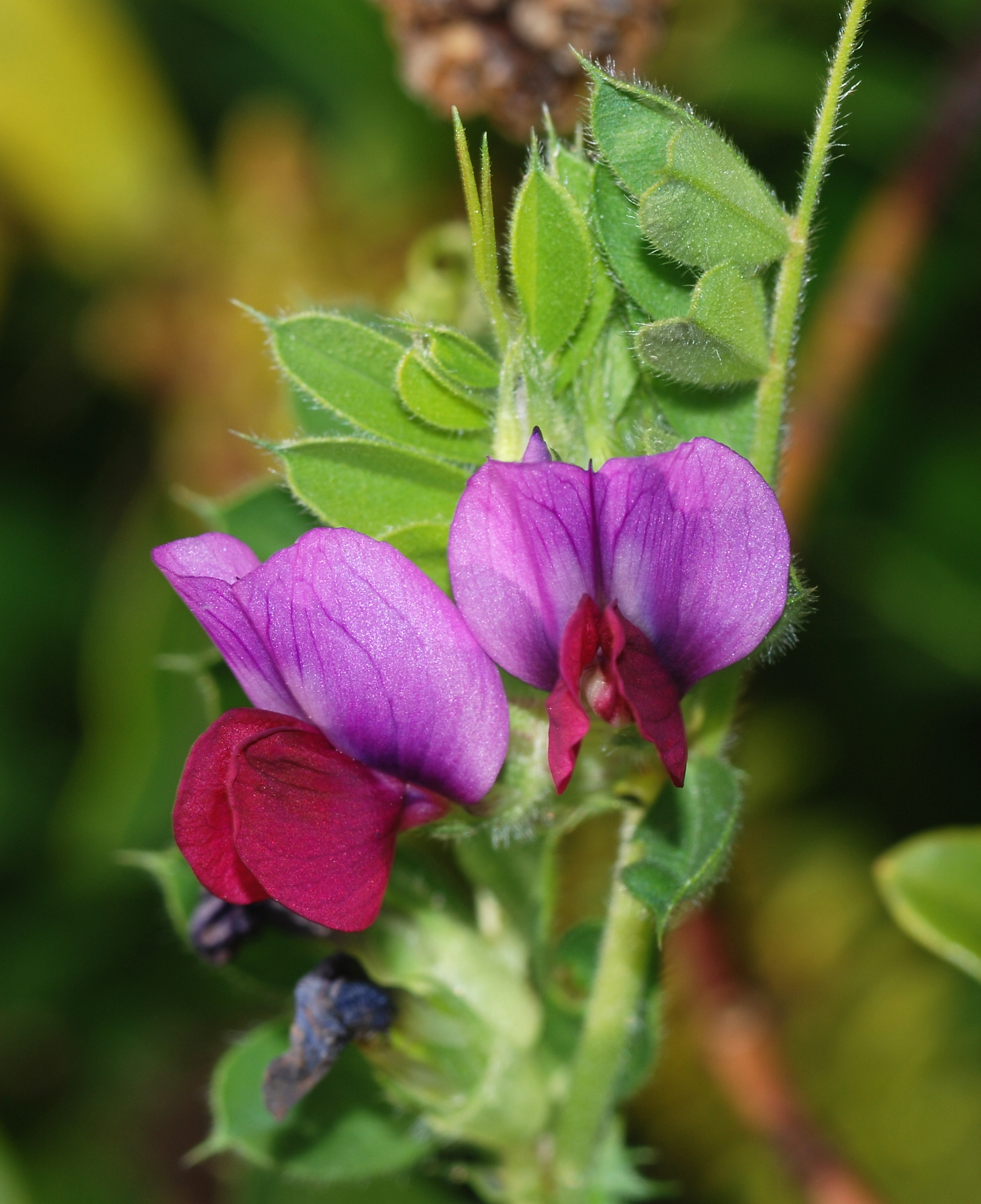
- Vicia sativa

Scientific classification
- Kingdom: Plantae
- Clade: Tracheophytes
- Clade: Angiosperms
- Clade: Eudicots
- Clade: Rosids
- Order: Fabales
- Family: Fabaceae
- Subfamily: Faboideae
- Clade: Meso-Papilionoideae
- Clade: Non-protein amino acid-accumulating clade
- Clade: Hologalegina
- Clade: Inverted repeat-lacking clade
- Tribe: Fabeae; Rchb.

Synonyms
- Vicieae DC. 1825; Vicieae Bronn

= Fabeae =

Tribe of legumes

The tribe Fabeae (sometimes referred to as "Vicieae") is one of the subdivisions of the plant family Fabaceae. It is included within the Inverted repeat-lacking clade (IRLC). Four genera are included:

- Lathyrus L. (vetchlings)
- Pisum L. (peas)
- Vavilovia Fed.
- Vicia L. (vetches, including lentils)
