= List of Vicia species =

The following species in the genus Vicia, the vetches, are accepted by Plants of the World Online. The taxonomy of this economically important genus remains unresolved, which hinders the development of underutilized crop species.

- Vicia abbreviata Fisch. ex Spreng.
- Vicia acutifolia Elliott
- Vicia afghanica Chrtková
- Vicia aintabensis Boiss. & Hausskn.
- Vicia aktoensis Y.H.Wu
- Vicia alpestris Steven
- Vicia altissima Desf.
- Vicia americana Muhl. ex Willd.
- Vicia amoena Fisch. ex Ser.
- Vicia amurensis Oett.
- Vicia anatolica Turrill
- Vicia andicola Kunth
- Vicia andina Phil.
- Vicia anguste-pinnata Nakai
- Vicia aphylla C.Sm. ex Link
- Vicia araucana Phil.
- Vicia argaea (P.H.Davis) Greuter
- Vicia argentea Lapeyr.
- Vicia armena Boiss.
- Vicia articulata Hornem.
- Vicia assyriaca Boiss.
- Vicia aucheri Jaub. & Spach
- Vicia bakeri Ali
- Vicia balansae Boiss.
- Vicia basaltica Plitmann
- Vicia benghalensis L.
- Vicia benthamiana Ali
- Vicia berteroana Phil.
- Vicia biebersteinii Besser ex M.Bieb.
- Vicia biennis L.
- Vicia bifolia Nakai
- Vicia bifoliolata J.J.Rodr.
- Vicia bijuga Gillies ex Hook. & Arn.
- Vicia bithynica (L.) L.
- Vicia brulloi Sciandr., Giusso, Salmeri & Miniss.
- Vicia bungei Ohwi
- Vicia caesarea Boiss. & Balansa
- Vicia canescens Labill.
- Vicia cappadocica Boiss.
- Vicia capreolata Lowe
- Vicia caroliniana Walter
- Vicia cassia Boiss.
- Vicia cassubica L.
- Vicia caucasica Ekutim.
- Vicia cedretorum Font Quer
- Vicia chaetocalyx Webb & Berthel.
- Vicia chianschanensis (P.Y.Fu & Y.A.Chen) Z.D.Xia
- Vicia chinensis Franch.
- Vicia chosenensis Ohwi
- Vicia ciceroidea Boiss.
- Vicia ciliatula Lipsky
- Vicia × colladensis Pérez Dacosta
- Vicia coquimbensis Martic.
- Vicia costae A.Hansen
- Vicia costata Ledeb.
- Vicia cracca L.
- Vicia cretica Boiss. & Heldr.
- Vicia crocea (Desf.) B.Fedtsch.
- Vicia cusnae Foggi & Ricceri
- Vicia cuspidata Boiss.
- Vicia cypria Kotschy
- Vicia dadianorum Sommier & Levier
- Vicia dalmatica A.Kern.
- Vicia davisii Greuter
- Vicia dennesiana H.C.Watson
- Vicia dichroantha Diels
- Vicia dionysiensis Mouterde
- Vicia disperma DC.
- Vicia dumetorum L.
- Vicia elegans Guss.
- Vicia epetiolaris Burkart
- Vicia eriocarpa (Hausskn.) Halácsy
- Vicia eristalioides Maxted
- Vicia ervilia (L.) Willd.
- Vicia erzurumica N.Demirkuș & S.Erik
- Vicia esdraelonensis Warb. & Eig
- Vicia faba L.
- Vicia fairchildiana Maire
- Vicia fauriei Franch.
- Vicia fedtschenkoana V.A.Nikitin
- Vicia ferreirensis Goyder
- Vicia filicaulis Webb & Berthel.
- Vicia floridana S.Watson
- Vicia freyniana Bornm.
- Vicia fulgens Batt.
- Vicia galeata Boiss.
- Vicia galilaea Plitmann & Zohary
- Vicia garinensis Dehshiri
- Vicia geminiflora Trautv.
- Vicia giacominiana Segelb.
- Vicia glareosa P.H.Davis
- Vicia glauca C.Presl
- Vicia gracilior (Popov) Popov
- Vicia graminea Sm.
- Vicia grandiflora Scop.
- Vicia × guyotii Beauverd
- Vicia hassei S.Watson
- Vicia hatschbachii Burkart ex Vanni & D.B.Kurtz
- Vicia hirsuta (L.) Gray
- Vicia hololasia Woronow
- Vicia hulensis Plitmann
- Vicia humilis Kunth
- Vicia hyaeniscyamus Mouterde
- Vicia hybrida L.
- Vicia hyrcanica Fisch. & C.A.Mey.
- Vicia iberica Grossh.
- Vicia incana Gouan
- Vicia inconspicua Phil.
- Vicia iranica Boiss.
- Vicia jadhavii R.Kr.Singh & Arigela
- Vicia janeae Mardal.
- Vicia japonica A.Gray
- Vicia johannis Tamamsch.
- Vicia jordanovii Velchev
- Vicia kalakhensis Khattab, Maxted & F.A.Bisby
- Vicia khokhriakovii Vorosch.
- Vicia kioshanica L.H.Bailey
- Vicia koeieana Rech.f.
- Vicia kokanica Regel & Schmalh.
- Vicia kotschyana Boiss.
- Vicia kulingana L.H.Bailey
- Vicia kurdica Jalilian
- Vicia laeta Ces.
- Vicia lanceolata Phil.
- Vicia larissae Prima
- Vicia lathyroides L.
- Vicia latibracteolata K.T.Fu
- Vicia lecomtei Humbert & Maire
- Vicia lens (L.) Coss. & Germ.
- Vicia lenticula (Hoppe) Janka
- Vicia lentoides (Ten.) Coss. & Germ.
- Vicia leucantha Biv.
- Vicia leucomalla Bornm.
- Vicia leucophaea Greene
- Vicia lilacina Ledeb.
- Vicia linearifolia Hook. & Arn.
- Vicia loiseleurii (M.Bieb.) Litv.
- Vicia lomensis J.F.Macbr.
- Vicia ludoviciana Nutt.
- Vicia lunata (Boiss. & Balansa) Boiss.
- Vicia lutea L.
- Vicia macrantha Jurtzev
- Vicia macrograminea Burkart
- Vicia magellanica Hook.f.
- Vicia megalotropis Ledeb.
- Vicia melanops Sm.
- Vicia menziesii Spreng.
- Vicia michauxii Biehler
- Vicia micrantha Lowe
- Vicia mingyueshanensis Z.Y.Xiao & X.C.Li
- Vicia minutiflora D.Dietr.
- Vicia modesta Phil.
- Vicia mollis Boiss. & Hausskn.
- Vicia monantha Retz.
- Vicia monardii Boiss. & Reut.
- Vicia montbretii Fisch. & C.A.Mey.
- Vicia montenegrina Rohlena
- Vicia montevidensis Vogel
- Vicia mucronata Clos
- Vicia mulleriana B.L.Turner
- Vicia multicaulis Ledeb.
- Vicia multijuga (Boiss.) Rech.f.
- Vicia murbeckii Maire
- Vicia nana Vogel
- Vicia narbonensis L.
- Vicia nataliae U.Reifenb. & A.Reifenb.
- Vicia nigricans Hook. & Arn.
- Vicia nipponica Matsum.
- Vicia noeana Boiss. & Reut.
- Vicia nummularia Hand.-Mazz.
- Vicia ocalensis R.K.Godfrey & Kral
- Vicia ochroleuca Ten.
- Vicia ohwiana Hosok.
- Vicia olchonensis (Peschkova) O.D.Nikif.
- Vicia onobrychioides L.
- Vicia orientalis (Boiss.) Bég. & Diratz.
- Vicia oroboides Wulfen
- Vicia orobus DC.
- Vicia palaestina Boiss.
- Vicia pallida Hook. & Arn.
- Vicia pampicola Burkart
- Vicia pannonica Crantz
- Vicia parviflora Cav.
- Vicia parvula Ziel.
- Vicia paucifolia Baker
- Vicia pectinata Lowe
- Vicia peregrina L.
- Vicia perelegans K.T.Fu
- Vicia peruviana Vilchez
- Vicia pinetorum Boiss. & Spruner
- Vicia pisiformis L.
- Vicia platensis Speg.
- Vicia popovii O.D.Nikif.
- Vicia pseudo-orobus Fisch. & C.A.Mey.
- Vicia pseudocassubica Rech.f.
- Vicia pubescens (DC.) Link
- Vicia pulchella Kunth
- Vicia pyrenaica Pourr.
- Vicia qatmensis Gomb.
- Vicia quadrijuga P.H.Davis
- Vicia ramosissima Franch.
- Vicia ramuliflora (Maxim.) Ohwi
- Vicia raynaudii Coulot & Dobignard
- Vicia rigidula Royle
- Vicia sabinarum J.Gil
- Vicia sativa L.
- Vicia scandens R.P.Murray
- Vicia semenovii (Regel & Herder) B.Fedtsch.
- Vicia semiglabra Rupr. ex Boiss.
- Vicia sepium L.
- Vicia sericocarpa Fenzl
- Vicia serratifolia Jacq.
- Vicia sessei G.Don
- Vicia sessiliflora Clos
- Vicia setifolia Kunth
- Vicia sibthorpii Boiss.
- Vicia sicula (Raf.) Guss.
- Vicia sinaica Boulos
- Vicia singarensis Boiss. & Hausskn.
- Vicia sosnowskyi Ekutim.
- Vicia sparsiflora Ten.
- Vicia splendens P.H.Davis
- Vicia stenophylla Vogel
- Vicia subrotunda (Maxim.) Czefr.
- Vicia subserrata Phil.
- Vicia subvillosa (Ledeb.) Boiss.
- Vicia sylvatica L.
- Vicia taipaica K.T.Fu
- Vicia tenera Benth.
- Vicia tenoi Marrero Rodr.
- Vicia tenuifolia Roth
- Vicia tenuissima (M.Bieb.) Schinz & Thell.
- Vicia tephrosioides Vogel
- Vicia ternata Z.D.Xia
- Vicia tetrantha H.W.Kung
- Vicia tetrasperma (L.) Schreb.
- Vicia tibetica Prain ex C.E.C.Fisch.
- Vicia tigridis Mouterde
- Vicia × tikeliana Starm.
- Vicia tsydenii Malyschev
- Vicia unijuga A.Braun
- Vicia uralensis Knjaz., Kulikov & E.G.Philippov
- Vicia variegata Willd.
- Vicia venosa (Willd. ex Link) Maxim.
- Vicia venulosa Boiss. & Hohen.
- Vicia vicina Clos
- Vicia vicioides (Desf.) Cout.
- Vicia villosa Roth
- Vicia voggenreiteriana J.Gil, R.Mesa & M.L.Gil
- Vicia vulcanorum J.Gil & M.L.Gil
- Vicia woroschilovii N.S.Pavlova
- Vicia wushanica Z.D.Xia
- Vicia × zabelii Asch. & Graebn.
