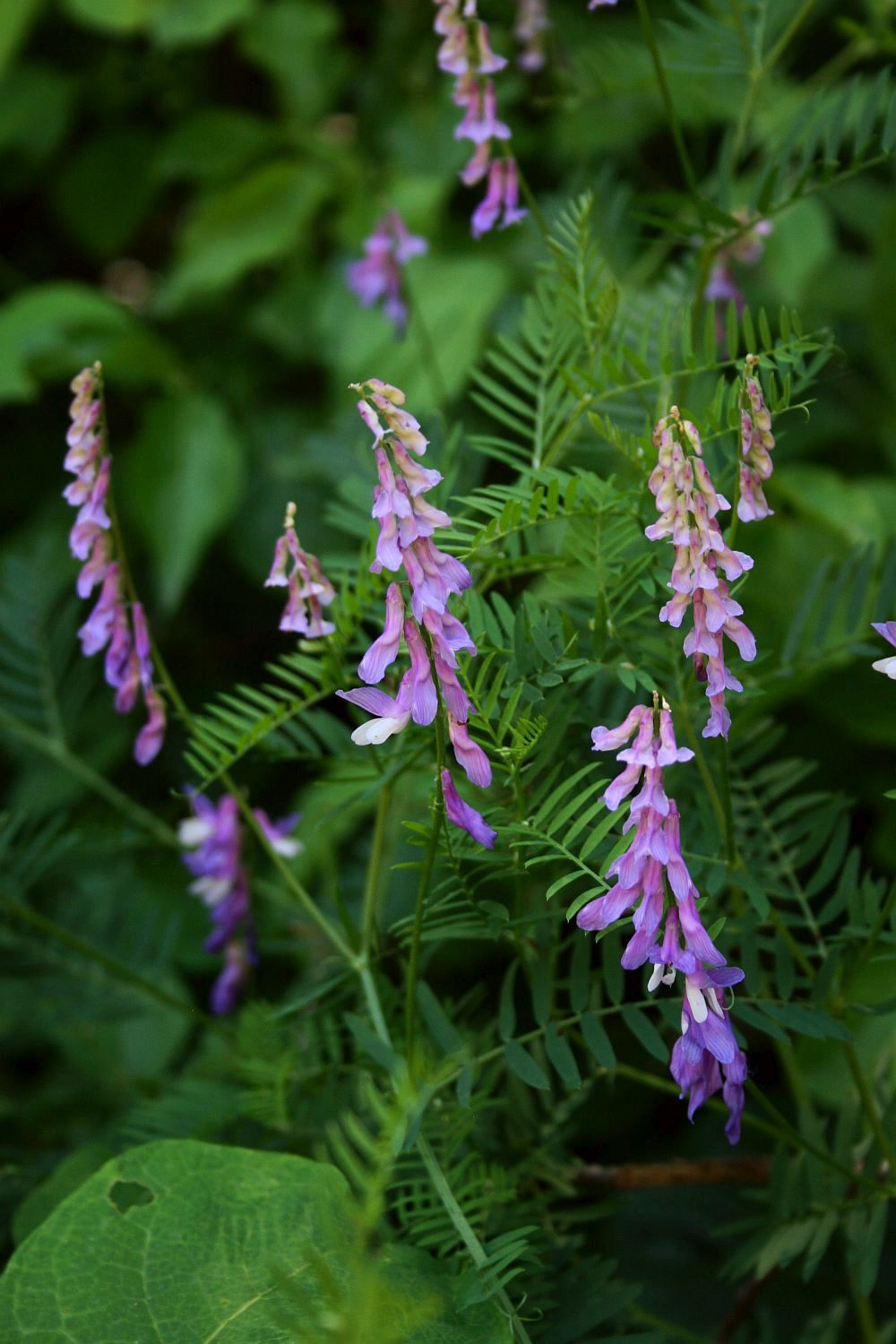

Conservation status
- Least Concern (IUCN 3.1)

Scientific classification
- Kingdom: Plantae
- Clade: Tracheophytes
- Clade: Angiosperms
- Clade: Eudicots
- Clade: Rosids
- Order: Fabales
- Family: Fabaceae
- Subfamily: Faboideae
- Genus: Vicia
- Species: V. tenuifolia

Binomial name
- Vicia tenuifolia Roth, 1788

Synonyms
- List: Cracca tenuifolia (Roth) Gren. & Godr.; Cracca tenuifolia (Roth) Opiz; Ervum tenuifolium (Roth) Trautv.; Vicia boissieri Freyn; Vicia cracca subsp. tenuifolia (Roth) Bonnier & Layens; Vicia cracca subsp. tenuifolia (Roth) Gaudin; Vicia cracca var. tenuifolia (Roth) G.Gaertn., B.Mey. & Scherb., 1801; Vicia tenuifolia subsp. boissieri (Freyn) Radhzi; Vicia tenuifolia subsp. boissieri Dinsm., 1932; Vicia variabilis Freyn & Sint.

= Vicia tenuifolia =

Species of plant

Vicia tenuifolia, the fine-leaved vetch, cow vetch, fodder vetch or bramble vetch, is a herbaceous perennial plant species in the family Fabaceae. This species is widespread in Europe and some parts of both Asia and Africa. In some other areas it occurs as an introduced species. In a few countries this edible vetch is used as food for both humans and farm animals.

== Taxonomy ==
Vicia tenuifolia was described by German botanist Albrecht Wilhelm Roth in his work Tentamen florae germanicae in 1788. Some taxonomists treat this species as a subspecies of Vicia cracca, while most recognize it as its own species.

There are a few recognized subspecies:

- Vicia tenuifolia subsp. atroviolacea (Bornm.) Greuter & Burdet
- Vicia tenuifolia subsp. delmasii (Emb. & Maire) Dobignard
- Vicia tenuifolia subsp. subalpina (Grossh.) Zernov
- Vicia tenuifolia subsp. tenuifolia
- Vicia tenuifolia subsp. variabilis (Freyn & Sint.) Dinsm.
- Vicia tenuifolia subsp. villosa (Batt.) Greuter

== Description ==
This herbaceous and perennial legume can reach from 30 to 150 centimetres of height. It is usually an upright-growing and spread out vetch with rough stem that is either hairless or hirsute. As with many other pea family species, Vicia tenuifolia is a nitrogen-fixing plant.

Its alternately arranged leaves are pinnately compound and most of the times consist of 10–18 pairs of narrowly linear to oblong leaflets. Pinna can be both hirsute or hairless and usually measure from 2 to 6 millimetres. Vicia tenuifolia has so called paripinnate leaves, that end with a split tendril. Stipules are present; they are narrowly linear, with entire leaf margin and end with a sharpened point.

The species is an entomophilous plant and flowers between June and August. Vicia tenuifolia has typical bilaterally symmetrical papilionaceous flowers, that consists of a banner, keel and wing, with the flower's petals being red, pink or blueish purple. The biggest petal – the so-called banner – is brighter than other petals, with its limb being as long as its claw. From 15 to 30 small flowers are arranged into an raceme inflorescence, that has long leafstalk (the latter is usually twice as long as the inflorescence). The flower's sepals are fused together into a few millimetres long calyx tube that ends with 5 short calyx tooth. Each flower has 10 anthers; the latter are fused together till the last third of anther's length.

This species' dried fruit is a brownish and hairless legume that can measure from 3 to 5 centimetres.

Vicia grandiflora can be confused with the similar vetch species Vicia dalmatica, Vicia cracca, Vicia incana and Vicia villosa.

== Distribution and conservation ==
This vetch species is widely distributed across Europe (especially the Euro-Mediterranean region, south and central Europe) and occurs also in some parts of Asia (usually those that are either temperate either tropical, mostly southwestern and central Asia), as well as in northern Africa. In north-western Europe it is not a native species. Vicia tenuifolia was once introduced to Hawaii. In some areas it is treated as an invasive species.

Vicia tenuifolia usually grows in a variety of habitats, which can include both natural and urban areas. This vetch is mostly an inhabitant of lowlands, where it can be found in dry meadows and forest edges, as well as on grassy banks, verges or waste ground, especially near railways, where it is a ruderal species. V. tenuifolia rarely occurs in uplands, with its maximum elevation being around 2,900 metres.

This species is listed as least concern (LC) species on the IUCN Red list, with its population being rated as stable.

== Gallery ==
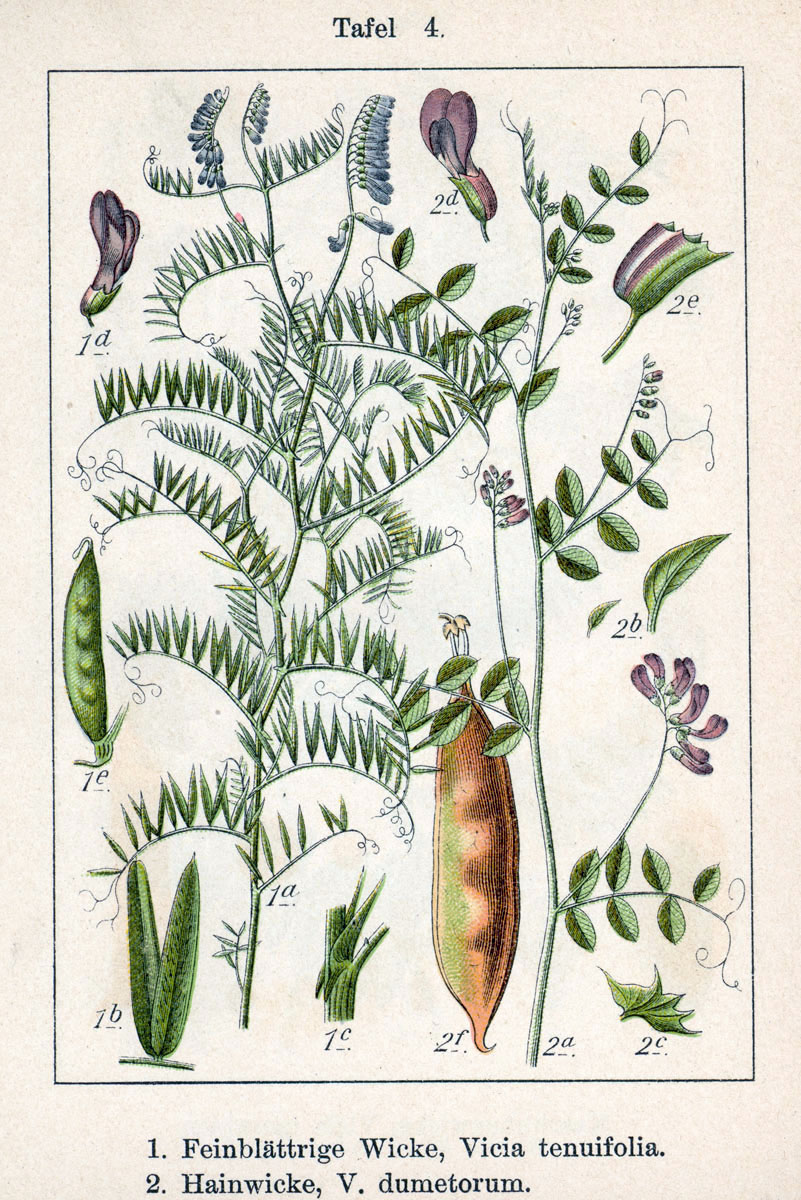

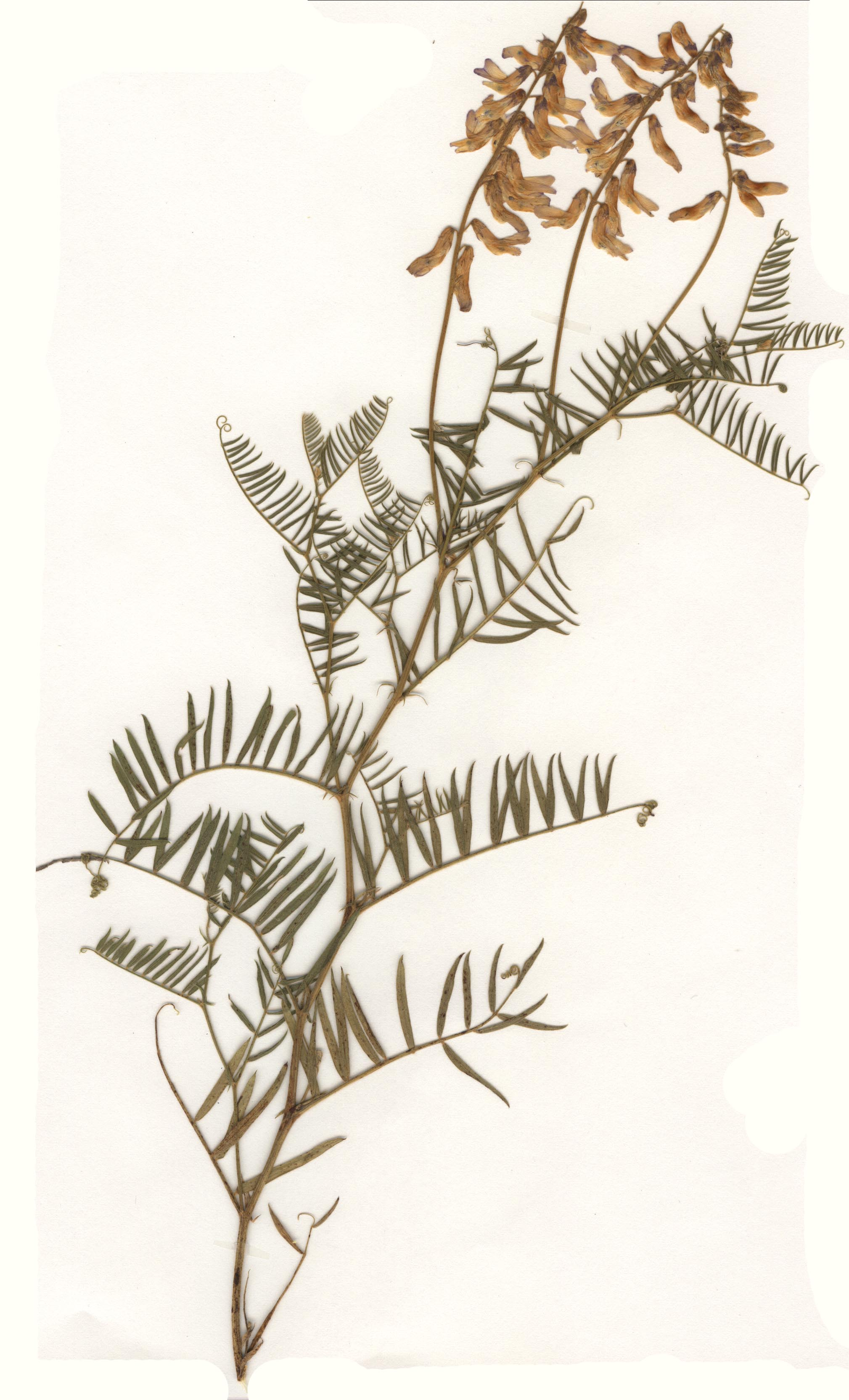

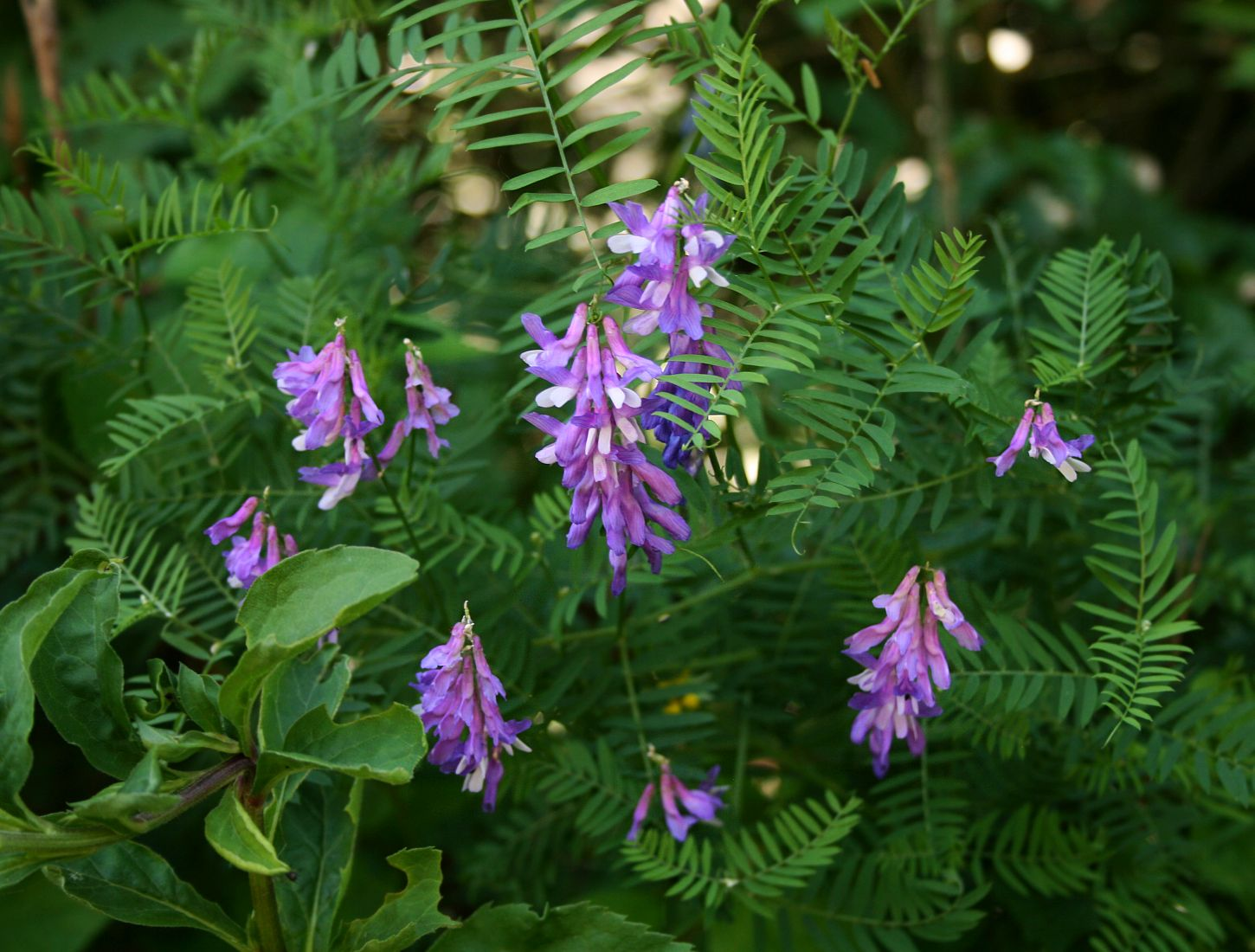

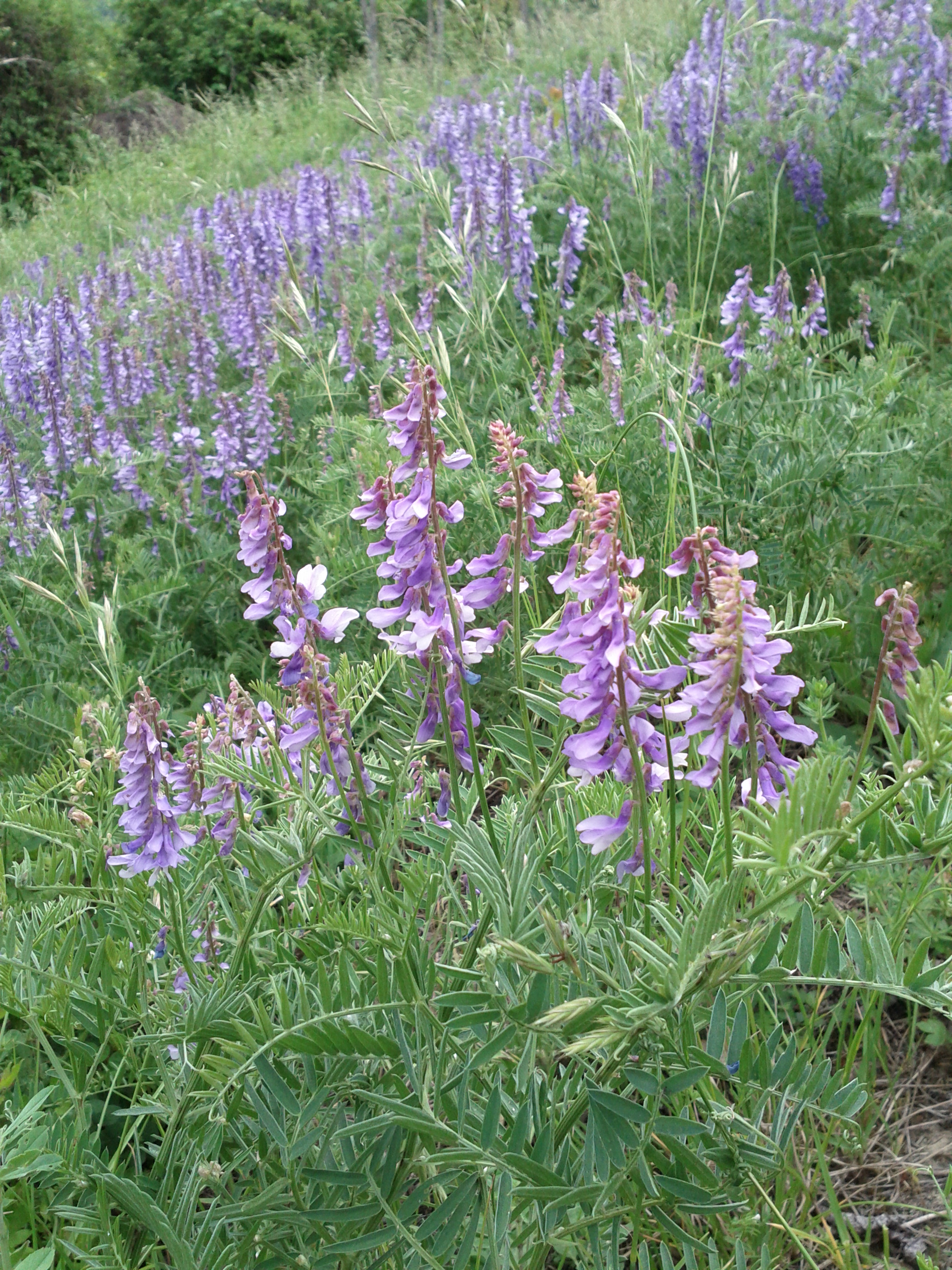

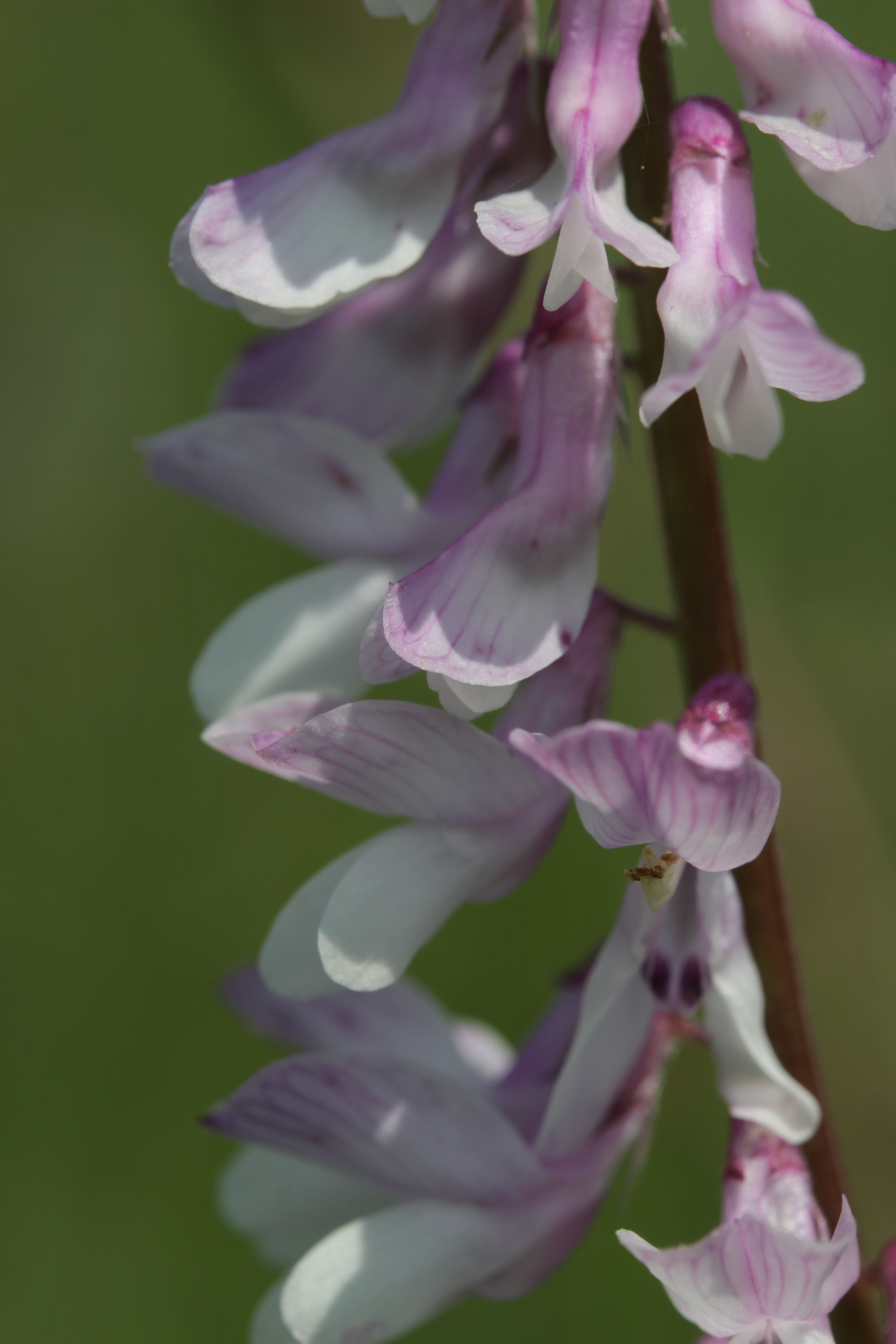

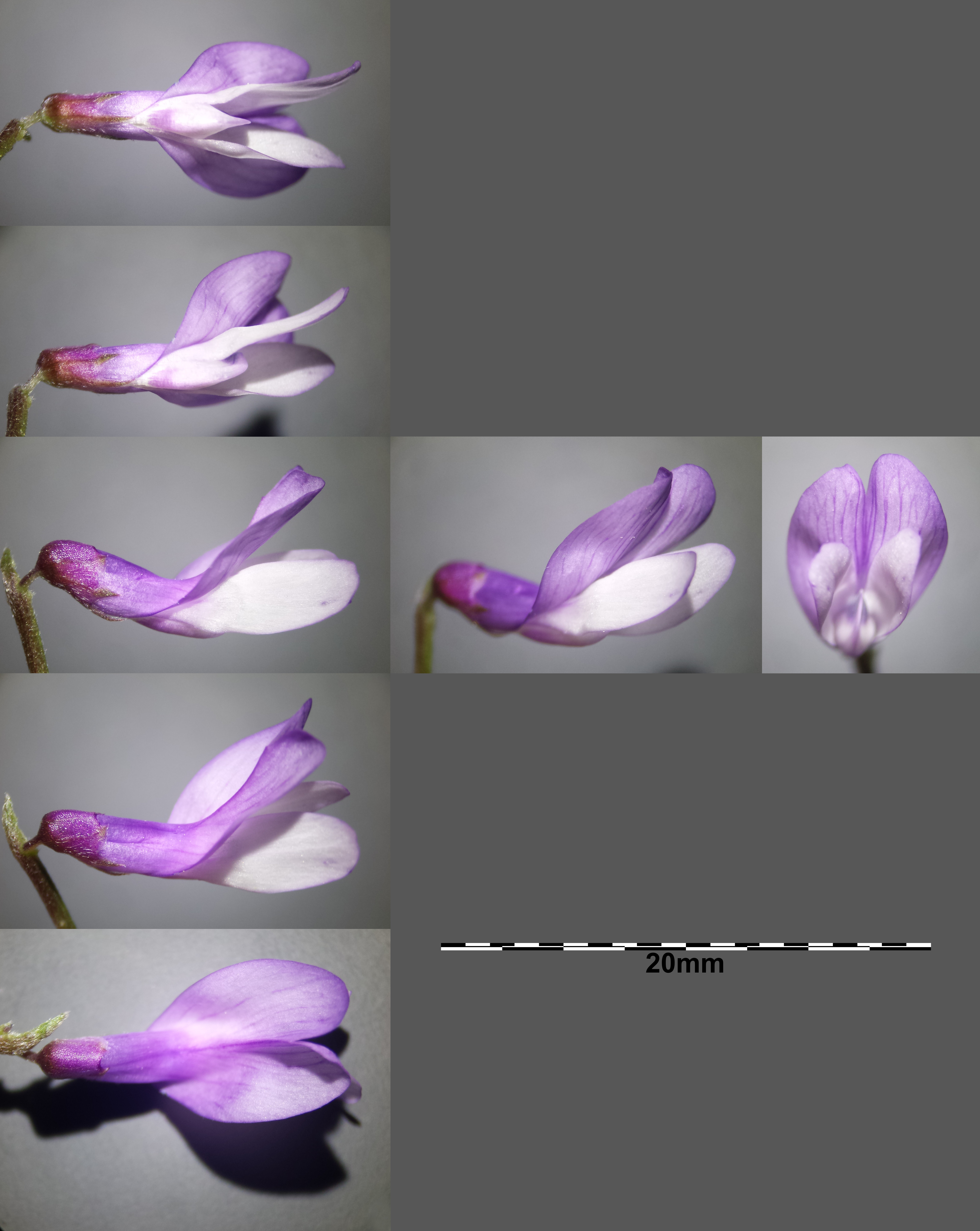

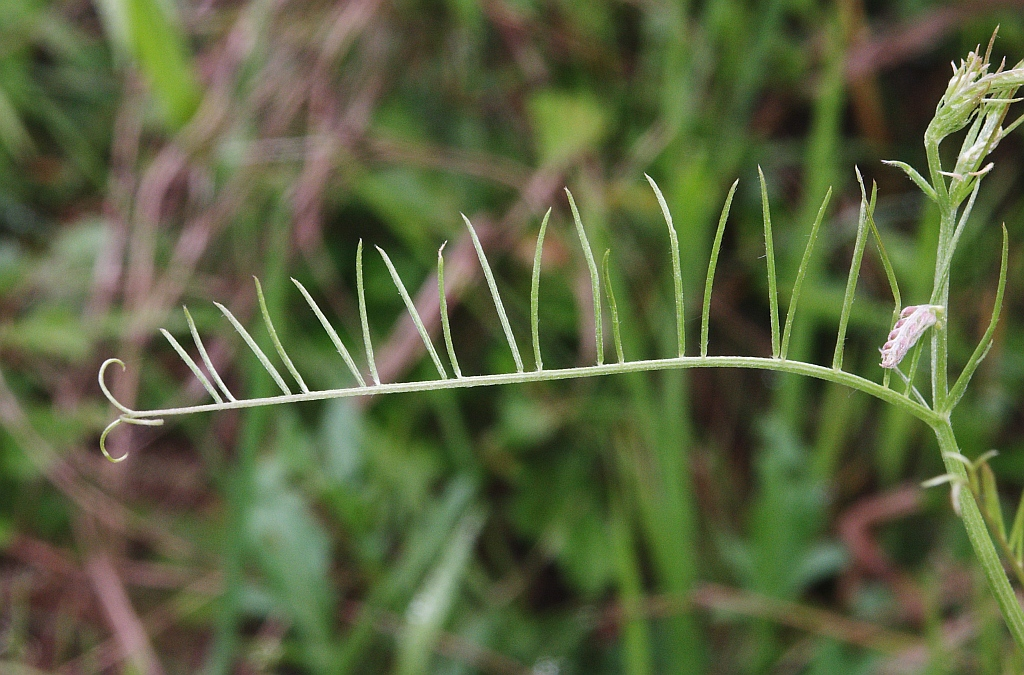

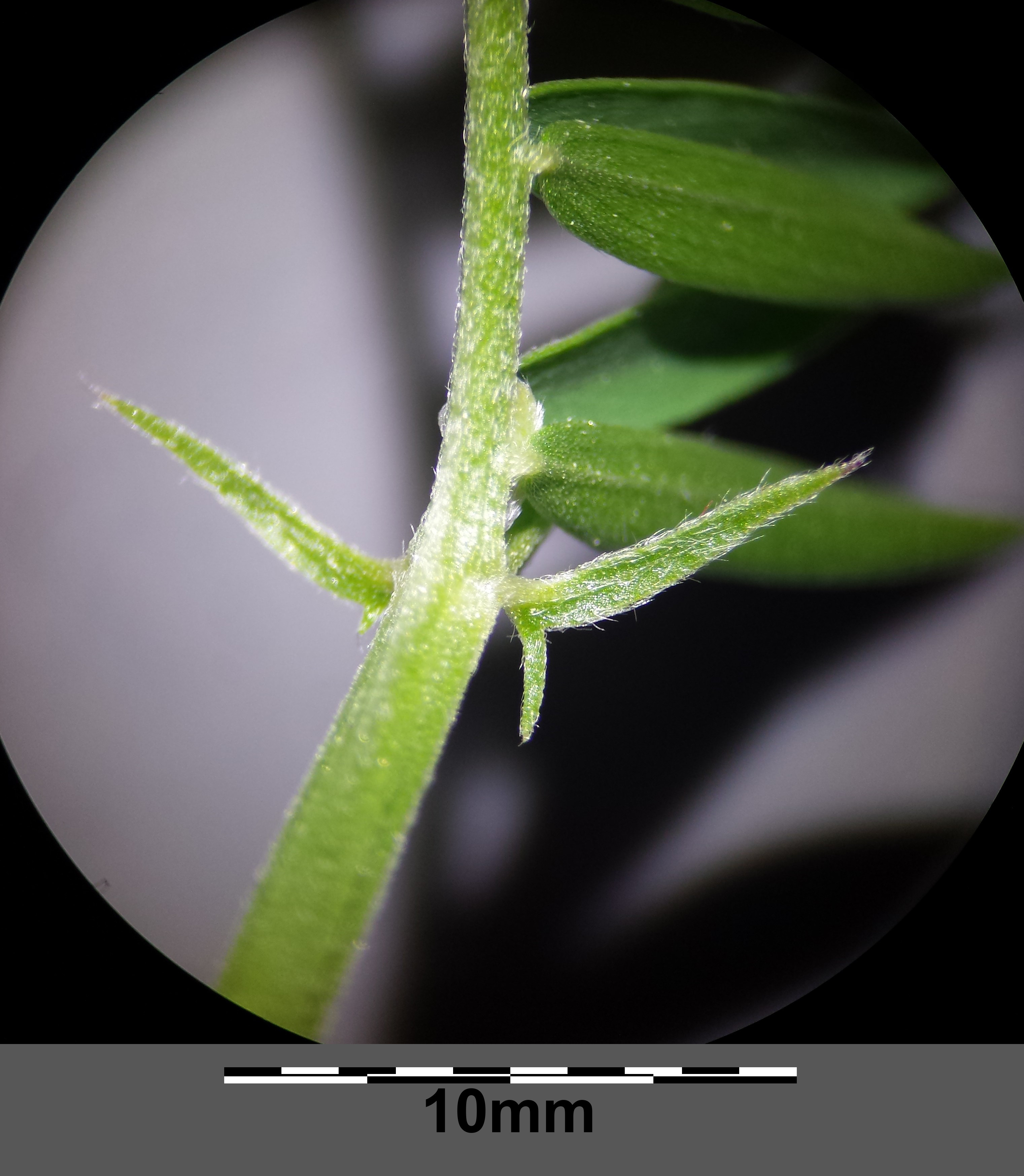
