= Vicia × zabelii =

Hybrid species of flowering plant

Vicia x zabelli is a hybrid native to Germany of Vicia cracca and Vicia sylvatica.
