= Allium antiatlanticum =

Scientific classification
- Kingdom: Plantae
- Clade: Tracheophytes
- Clade: Angiosperms
- Clade: Monocots
- Order: Asparagales
- Family: Amaryllidaceae
- Subfamily: Allioideae
- Genus: Allium
- Species: A. antiatlanticum

Binomial name
- Allium antiatlanticum Emb. & Maire

Synonyms
- Allium paniculatum subsp. antiatlanticum (Emb. & Maire) Maire & Weiller; Allium paniculatum var. rifanum Maire

Species of flowering plant

Allium antiatlanticum is a plant species native to Morocco and Algeria. It is a bulb-forming perennial with a scent resembling that of garlic or leeks. It has a bulb and is pollinated by bees and other insects.
