= Hairy vetch =

Hairy vetch is a common name for several plants and may refer to:

- Vicia hirsuta
- Vicia sativa
- Vicia villosa, native to Europe and western Asia
