= Agriculture in Massachusetts =

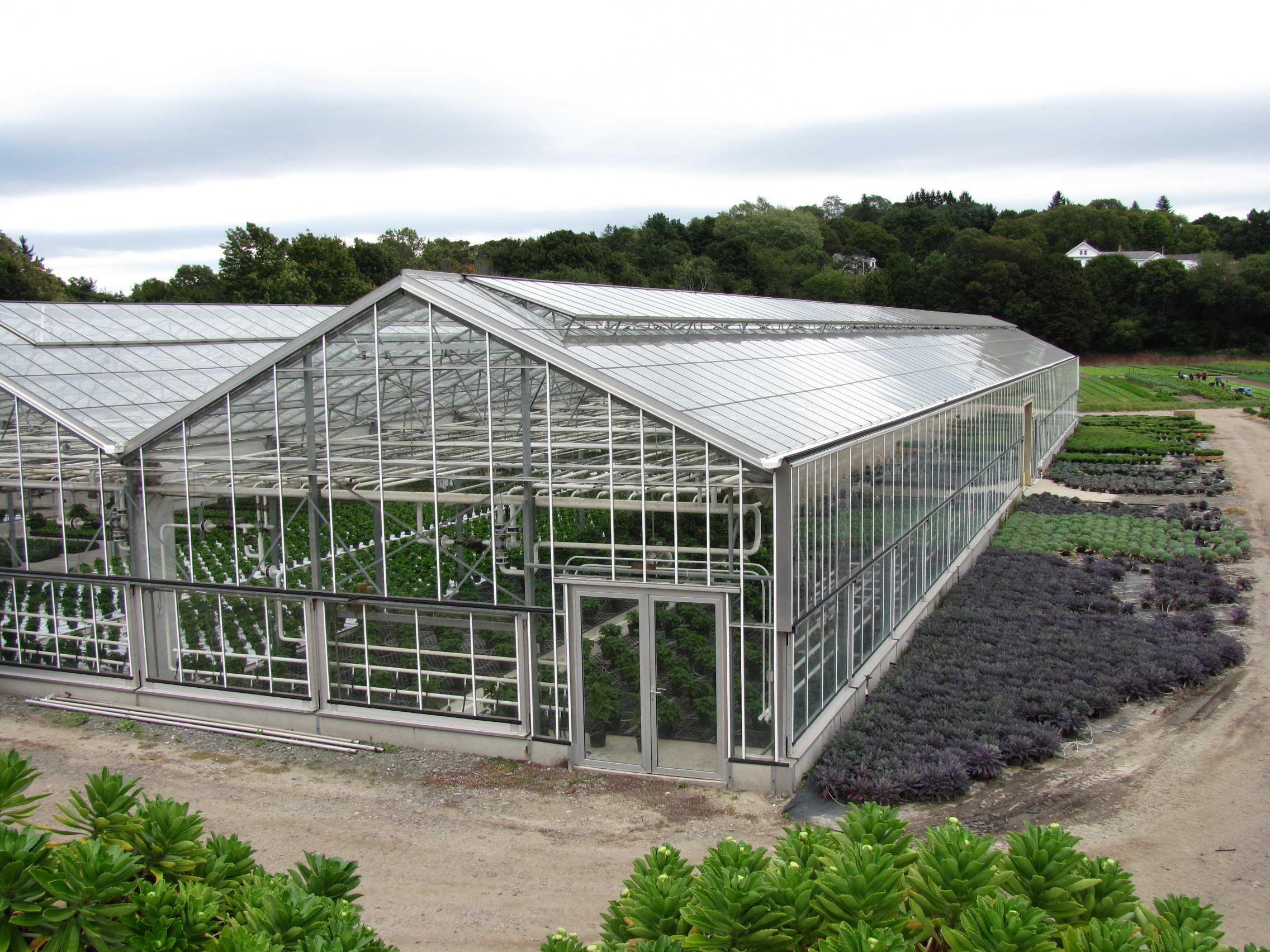
Greenhouse farming in East Lexington

Greenhouse, floriculture, and sod products – including the ornamental market – make up more than one third of the state's agricultural output. Cranberries, sweet corn and apples are also large sectors of production. Fruit cultivation is an important part of the state's agricultural revenues. Massachusetts is the second-largest cranberry-producing (Vaccinium macrocarpon) state in the union after Wisconsin.

As of 2012, there were 7,755 farms in Massachusetts encompassing a total of 523,517 acres (2,120 km^{2}), averaging 67.5 acres (27.3 hectares) apiece, but by 2017 this had declined somewhat again, to 7,241 farms in the state. Agriculture in the state is served and represented by the Department of Agricultural Resources (MDAR). The UMass Extension Fruit Program provides information to support growers.

Strawberries grown in Massachusetts suffer from Botrytis Gray Mold (Botrytis cinerea) and Tarnished Plant Bug (Lygus lineolaris).

The Asian long-horned beetle (ALB, Anoplophora glabripennis) was detected in Worcester in 2008 and as of April 2021 is still uneradicated. However, a ALB population in Boston that was detected in 2010 has since been successfully eradicated.

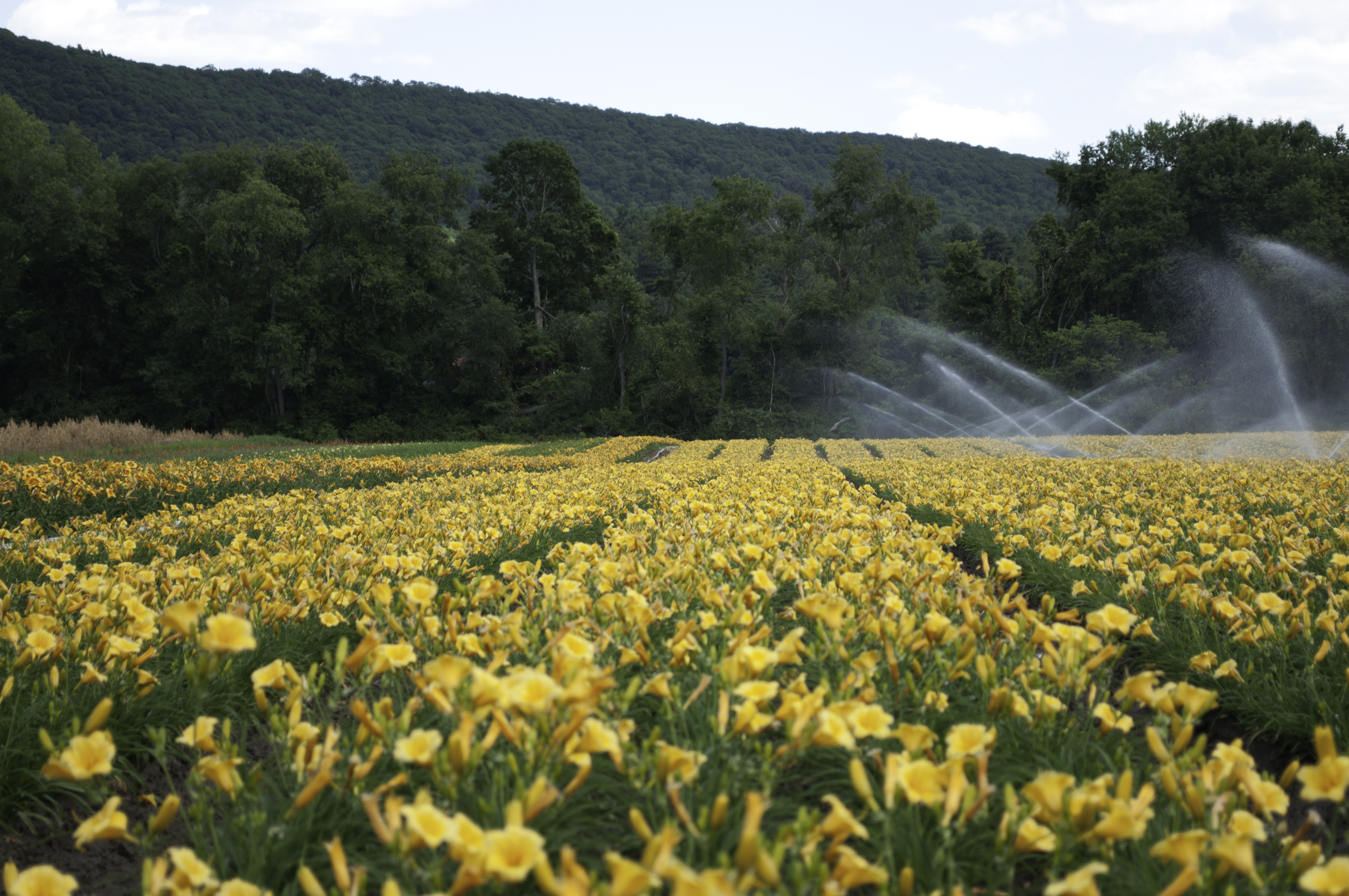
Flowers grown on a farm in Deerfield

Cover cropping has been successful elsewhere and can be used here. Akbari et al. 2019 finds that Winter rye (Secale cereale) and Hairy vetch (Vicia villosa) are effective covers for weed control in Massachusetts.
