= V. nana =

V. nana may refer to:

- Vicia nana, a flowering plant species found in South America
- Vampirolepis nana, a synonym for Hymenolepis nana, the dwarf tapeworm, a cosmopolitan cestode species that is one of the most common cestodes of humans in the world

== See also ==
- Nana (disambiguation)
