= Vicia sinaica =

Scientific classification
- Kingdom: Plantae
- Clade: Tracheophytes
- Clade: Angiosperms
- Clade: Eudicots
- Clade: Rosids
- Order: Fabales
- Family: Fabaceae
- Subfamily: Faboideae
- Genus: Vicia
- Species: V. sinaica

Binomial name
- Vicia sinaica Boulos

Species of plant

Vicia sinaica is a species of flowering plant in the family Fabaceae, endemic to the Sinai Peninsula. A very rare therophyte found in plains, depressions, and wadis, it is believed to be extinct.
