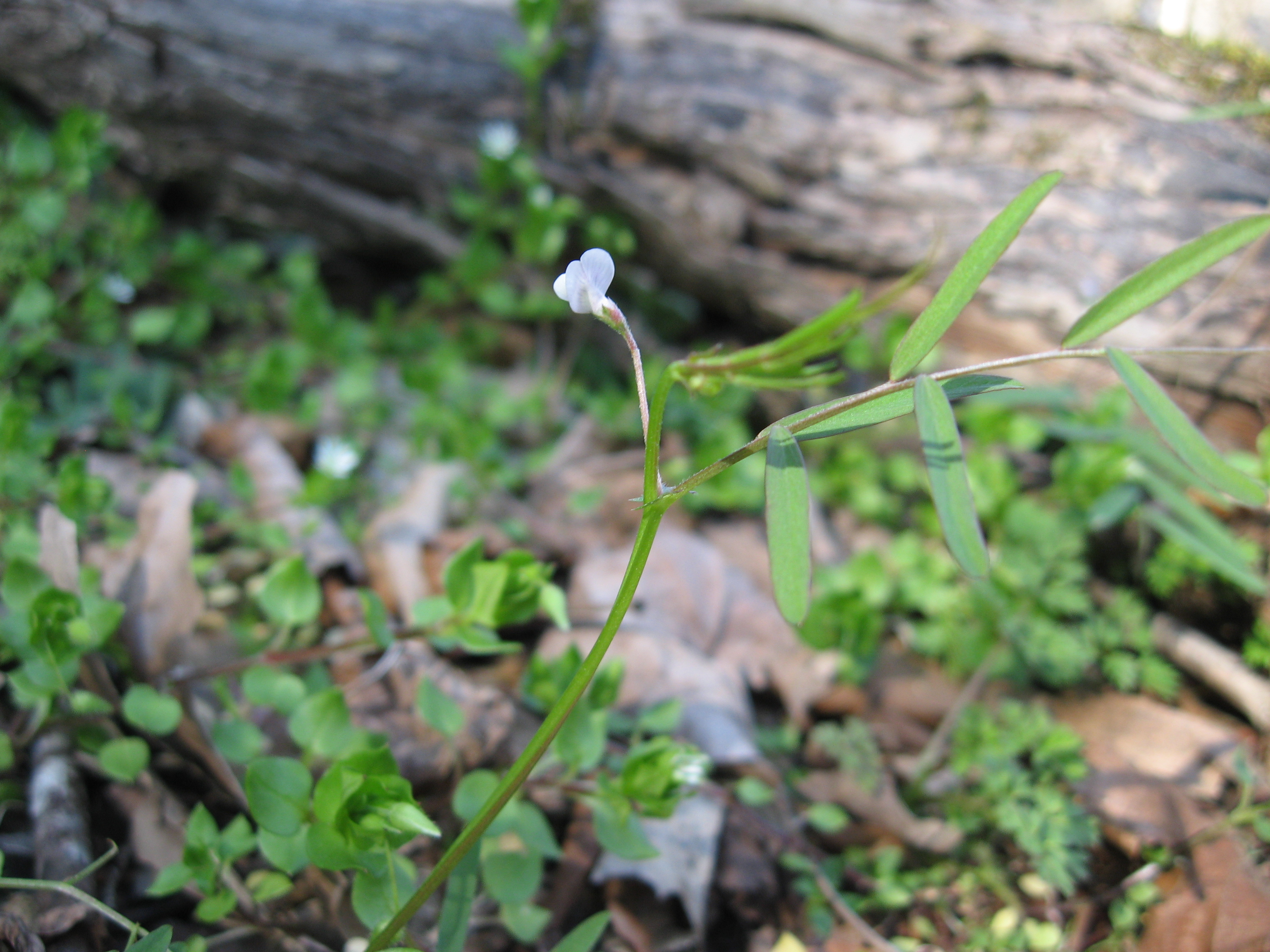

Conservation status
- Least Concern (IUCN 3.1)

Scientific classification
- Kingdom: Plantae
- Clade: Embryophytes
- Clade: Tracheophytes
- Clade: Spermatophytes
- Clade: Angiosperms
- Clade: Eudicots
- Clade: Rosids
- Order: Fabales
- Family: Fabaceae
- Subfamily: Faboideae
- Tribe: Fabeae
- Genus: Vicia
- Species: V. minutiflora

Binomial name
- Vicia minutiflora F.G. Dietrich

= Vicia minutiflora =

Species of legume

Vicia minutiflora, commonly known as pygmyflower vetch or smallflower vetch, is a species of plant in the legume family. It is native to the Southeastern United States, where it is most often found in dry, open woodlands.

It produces small white flowers in early spring.
