= Vicia popovii =

Scientific classification
- Kingdom: Plantae
- Clade: Tracheophytes
- Clade: Angiosperms
- Clade: Eudicots
- Clade: Rosids
- Order: Fabales
- Family: Fabaceae
- Subfamily: Faboideae
- Genus: Vicia
- Species: V. popovii

Binomial name
- Vicia popovii O.D.Nikif.

Synonyms
- Vicia multicaulis subsp. popovii (O.D.Nikif.) Vorosch.

Species of plant in the legume family

Vicia popovii is a species of flowering plant in the vetch genus Vicia, family Fabaceae, native to Chita and Amur Oblasts of Russia. It is a climber.
