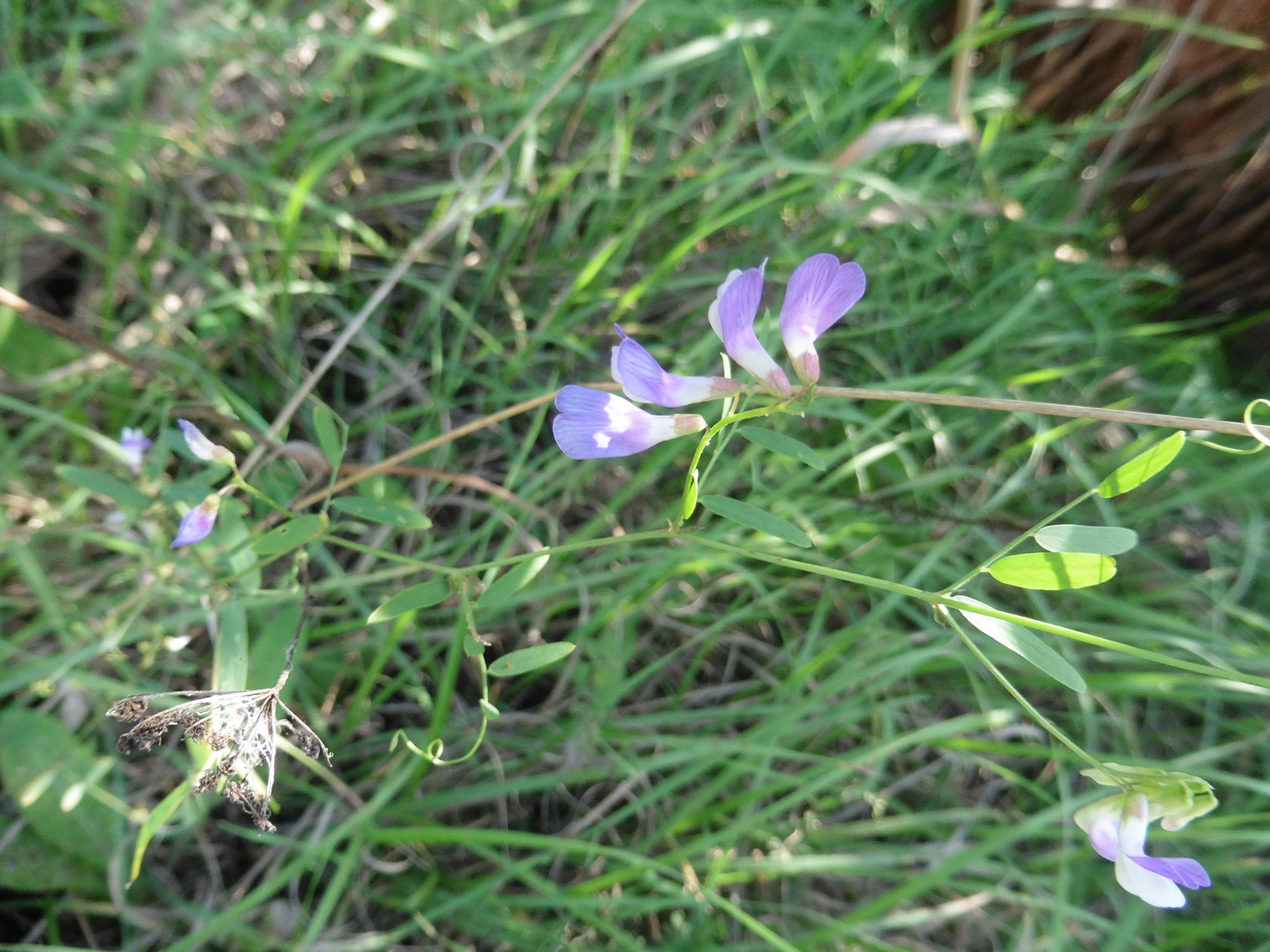

Scientific classification
- Kingdom: Plantae
- Clade: Tracheophytes
- Clade: Angiosperms
- Clade: Eudicots
- Clade: Rosids
- Order: Fabales
- Family: Fabaceae
- Subfamily: Faboideae
- Genus: Vicia
- Species: V. biennis

Binomial name
- Vicia biennis L.

= Vicia biennis =

Species of legume

Vicia biennis is a species of flowering plant belonging to the family Fabaceae.

Its native range is Hungary to Western Siberia and Caucasus.
