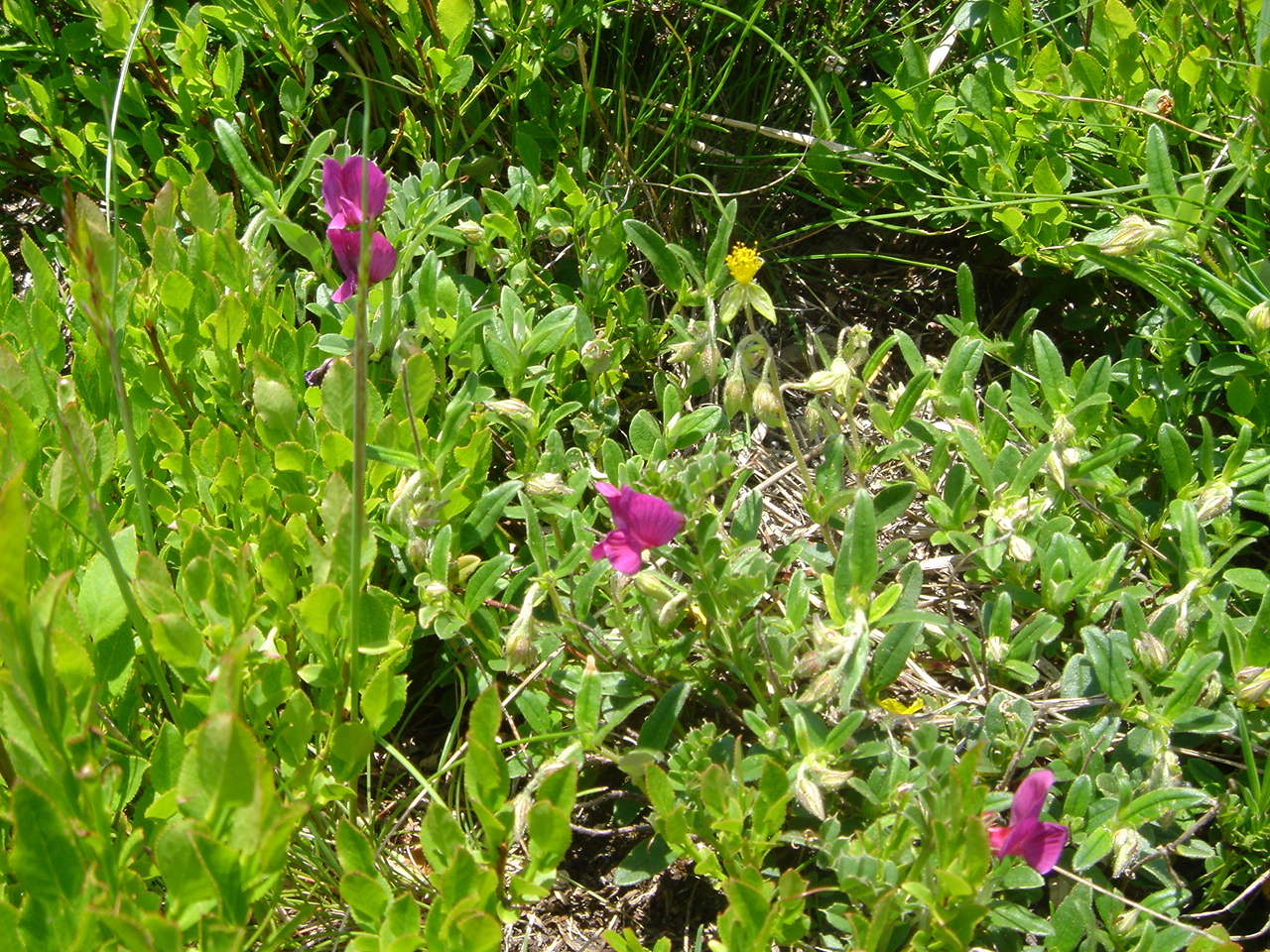

Scientific classification
- Kingdom: Plantae
- Clade: Tracheophytes
- Clade: Angiosperms
- Clade: Eudicots
- Clade: Rosids
- Order: Fabales
- Family: Fabaceae
- Subfamily: Faboideae
- Tribe: Fabeae
- Genus: Vicia
- Species: V. pyrenaica

Binomial name
- Vicia pyrenaica Pourr.

= Vicia pyrenaica =

Species of legume

Vicia pyrenaica, known as Pyrenean vetch, is a species of flowering plant in the bean family Fabaceae. It is grown as an ornamental and is a hardy perennial with compact foliage that produces deep crimson flowers in Summer.
