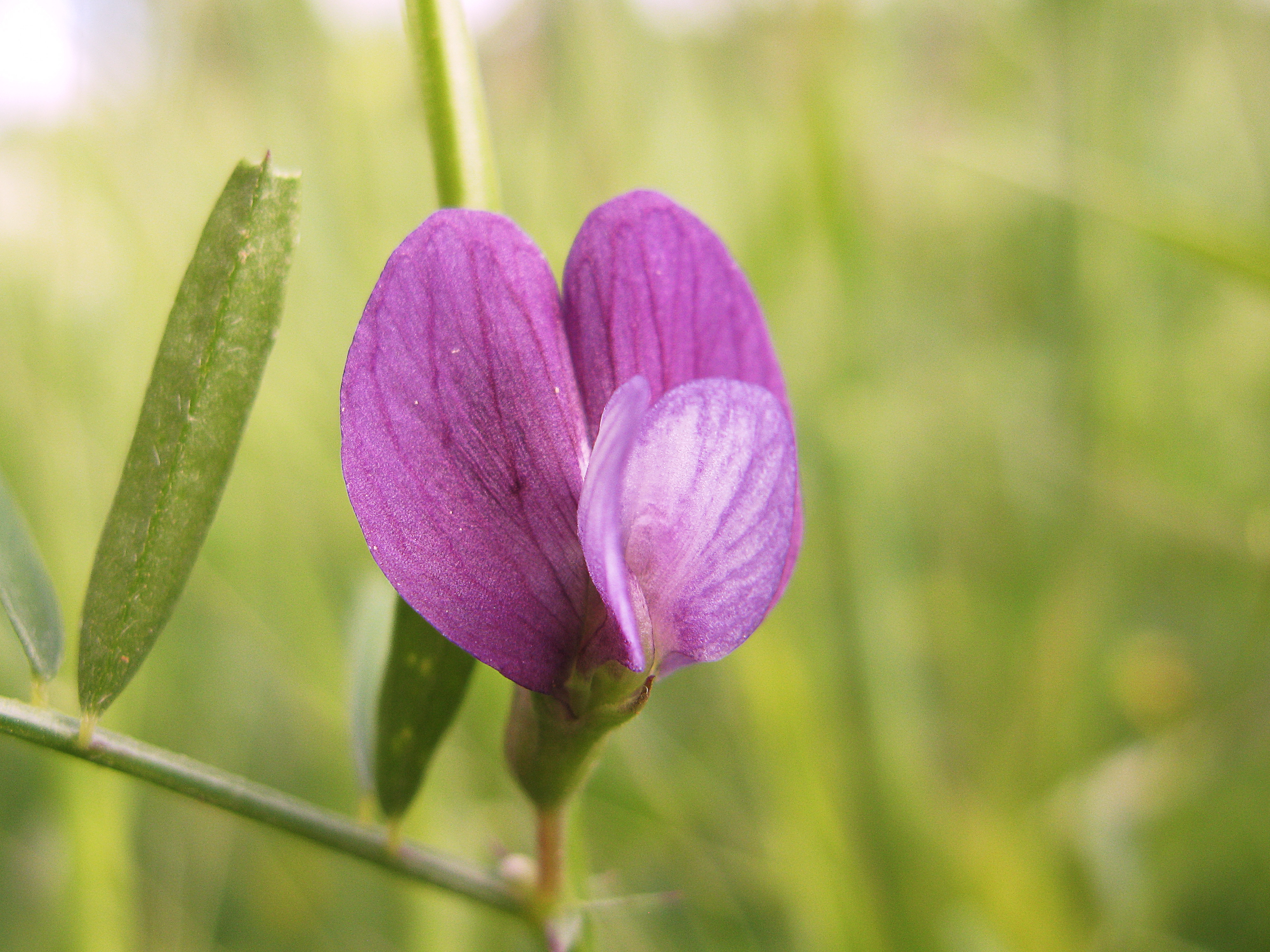

Conservation status
- Least Concern (IUCN 3.1)

Scientific classification
- Kingdom: Plantae
- Clade: Tracheophytes
- Clade: Angiosperms
- Clade: Eudicots
- Clade: Rosids
- Order: Fabales
- Family: Fabaceae
- Subfamily: Faboideae
- Genus: Vicia
- Species: V. peregrina

Binomial name
- Vicia peregrina L.

Synonyms
- Vicia leptophylla

= Vicia peregrina =

Species of plant

Vicia peregrina, the wandering vetch, is a species of annual herb in the family Fabaceae. They are climbers and have compound, broad leaves. Individuals can grow to 0.32 m.

== Sources ==
This article incorporates text from a free content work. Licensed under CC0 (license statement/permission). Text taken from Vicia peregrina. Encyclopedia of Life.
