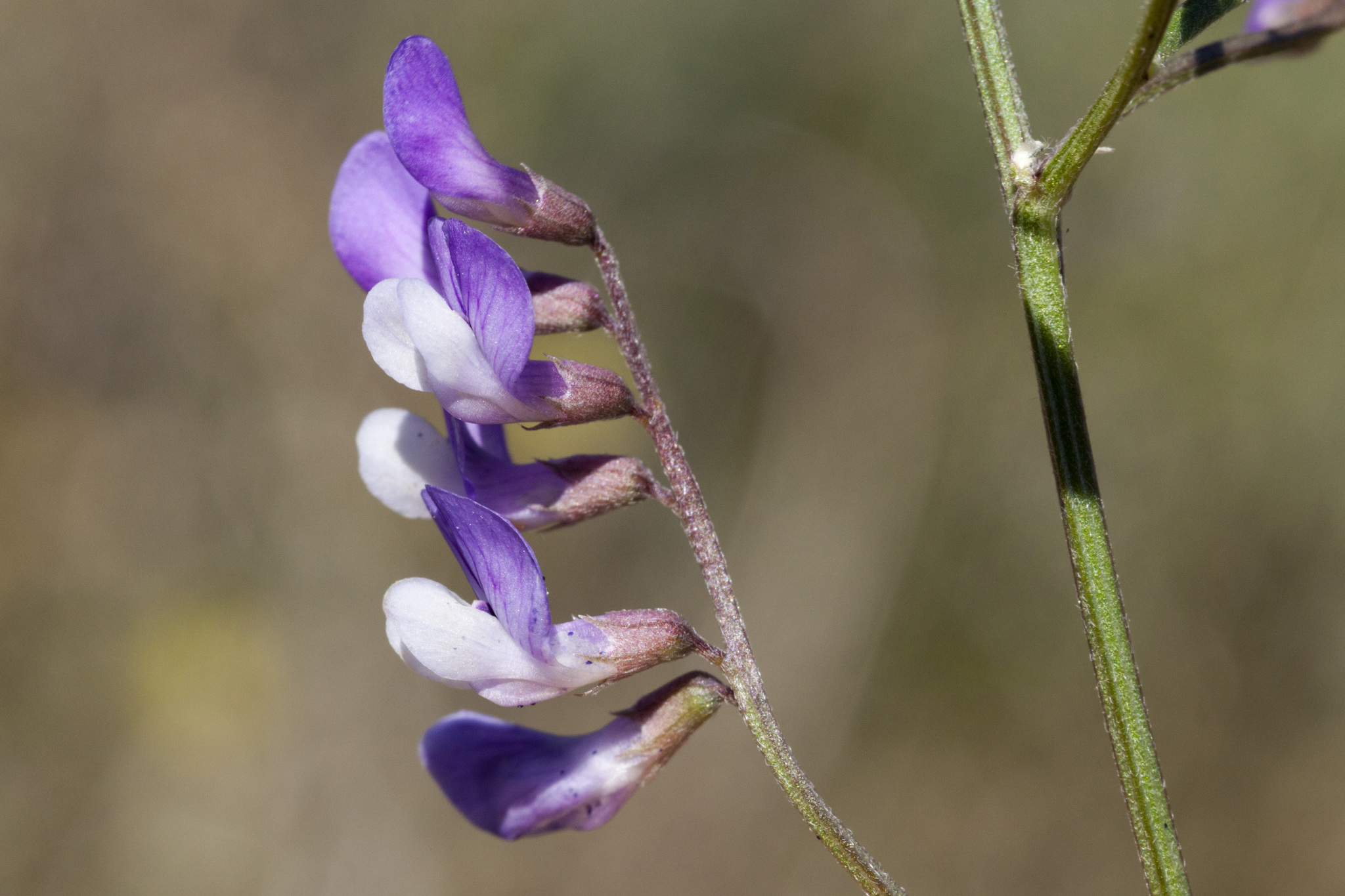

Conservation status
- Secure (NatureServe)

Scientific classification
- Kingdom: Plantae
- Clade: Tracheophytes
- Clade: Angiosperms
- Clade: Eudicots
- Clade: Rosids
- Order: Fabales
- Family: Fabaceae
- Subfamily: Faboideae
- Genus: Vicia
- Species: V. ludoviciana

Binomial name
- Vicia ludoviciana Nutt.

Varieties
- Vicia ludoviciana var. laxiflora Shinners; Vicia ludoviciana var. leavenworthii (Torr. & A.Gray) Broich; Vicia ludoviciana var. ludoviciana

Synonyms
- List: Cracca ludoviciana (Nutt.) Alef. (1861); Ervum ludovicianum (Nutt.) Stank. (1982); Vicia ludoviciana var. typica Shinners (1948)

= Vicia ludoviciana =

Species of flowering plant

Vicia ludoviciana, also known by its common name slender vetch is a species from the genus Vicia.
