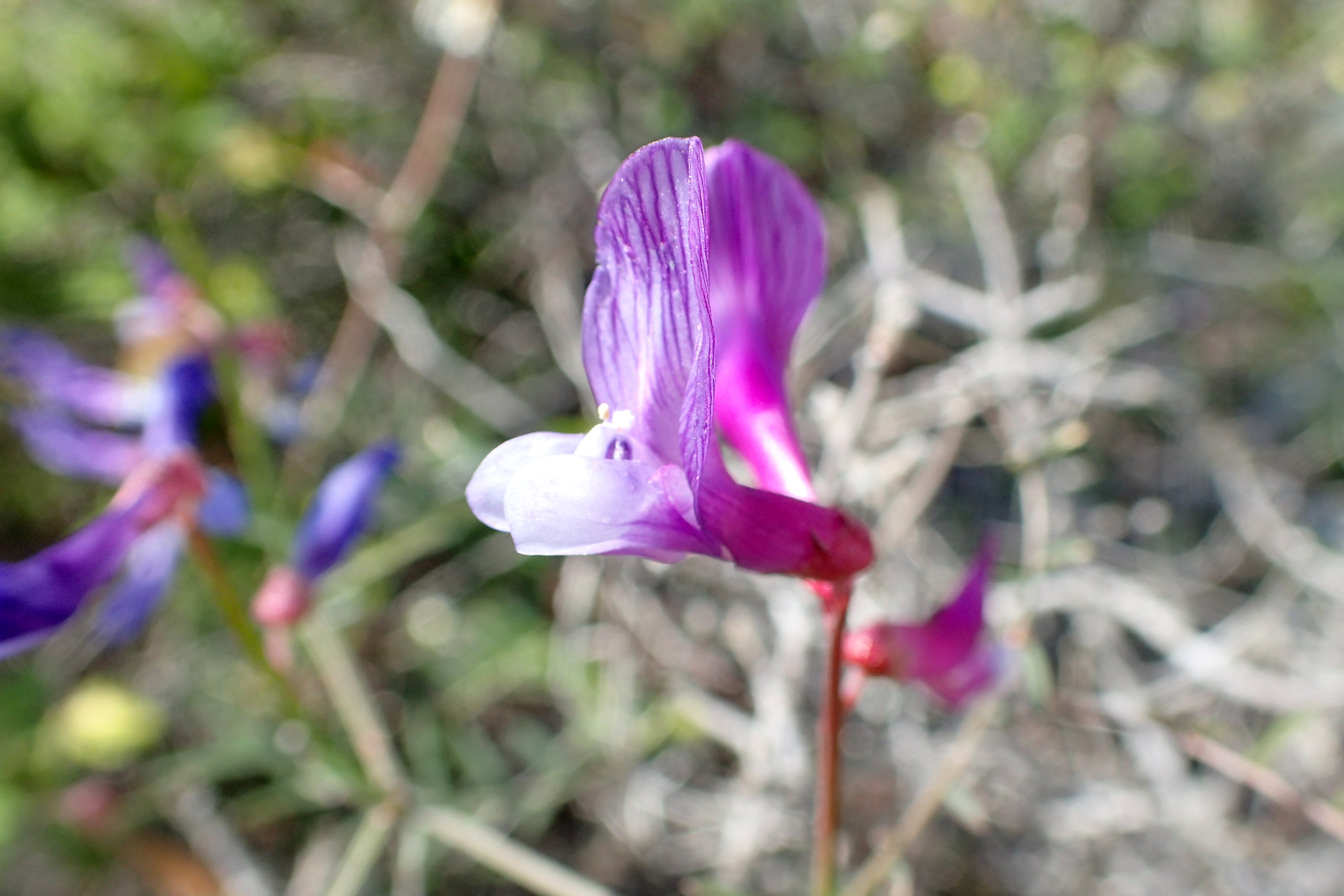
- Close-up of flower
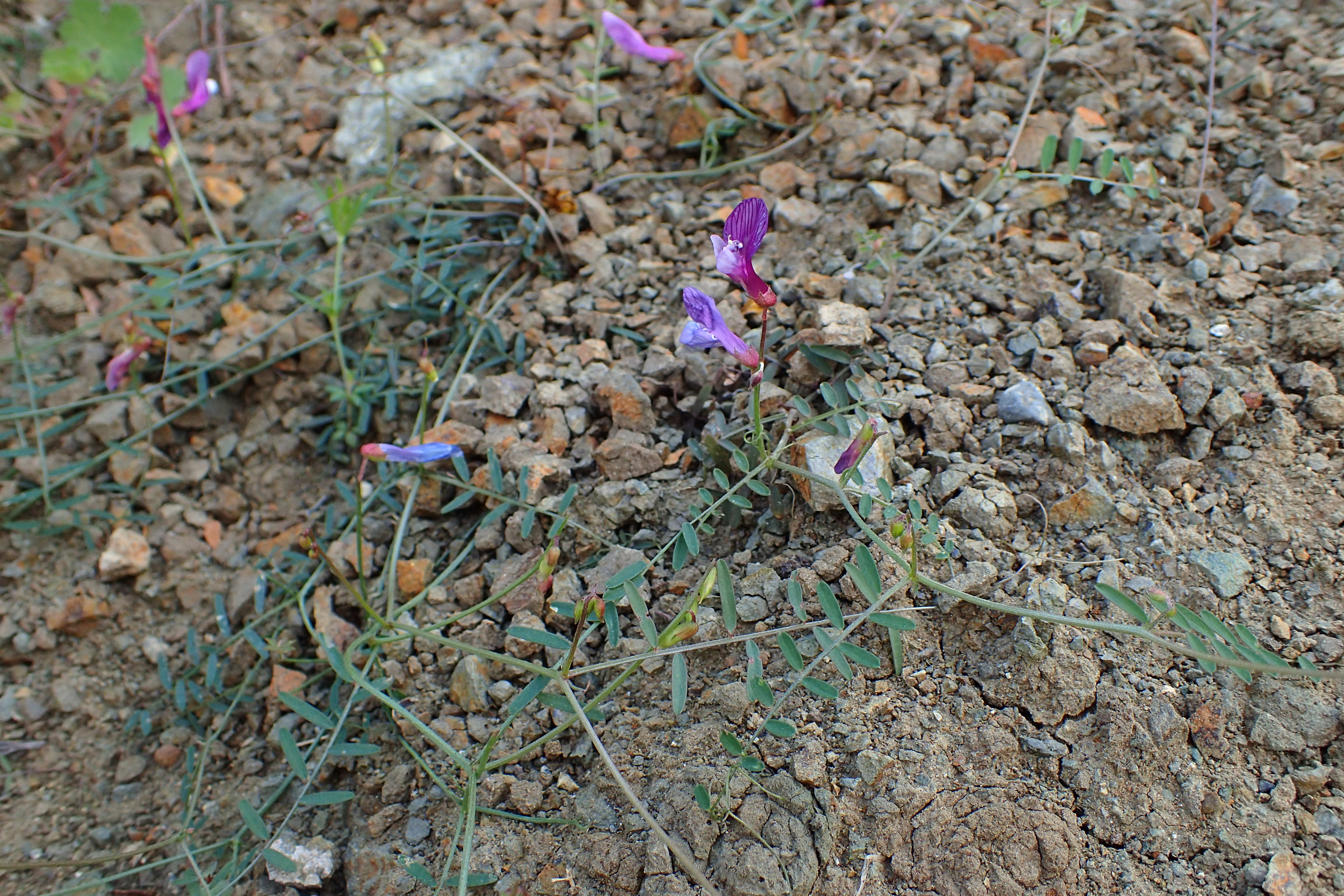
- Habit

Scientific classification
- Kingdom: Plantae
- Clade: Tracheophytes
- Clade: Angiosperms
- Clade: Eudicots
- Clade: Rosids
- Order: Fabales
- Family: Fabaceae
- Subfamily: Faboideae
- Genus: Vicia
- Species: V. palaestina

Binomial name
- Vicia palaestina Boiss.

Synonyms
- Ervum palaestinum (Boiss.) Stank.; Vicia fleischeri Hochst. & Steud. ex Boiss.

= Vicia palaestina =

Species of plant in the legume family

Vicia palaestina, the Palestine vetch, is a species of flowering plant in the family Fabaceae. It is native to the eastern Mediterranean region; Greece, the Aegean Islands, Turkey, Cyprus, the Levant, Sinai, and Iraq. Carbonized remains of its seeds have been tentatively identified in Mousterian Neanderthal deposits in Kebara Cave, Mount Carmel, Israel. Unlike many species of vetch, its seeds are non-toxic, and are edible even when raw.
