= Vicia anatolica =

Scientific classification
- Kingdom: Plantae
- Clade: Tracheophytes
- Clade: Angiosperms
- Clade: Eudicots
- Clade: Rosids
- Order: Fabales
- Family: Fabaceae
- Subfamily: Faboideae
- Genus: Vicia
- Species: V. anatolica

Binomial name
- Vicia anatolica Turrill

Synonyms
- Vicia hajastana Grossh.

Species of plant in the legume family

Vicia anatolica (syn. Vicia hajastana) is a species of flowering plant in the vetch genus Vicia, family Fabaceae. It is native to Crimea, the Caucasus, Turkey, Iran, Turkmenistan, and Kyrgyzstan. As its synonym Vicia hajastana it is used in studies of cytoskeletal structures and other cellular functions since it is amenable to laboratory media culturing.
