= Loutfy Boulos =

Egyptian botanist (1932–2015)

- Born: May 14, 1932; Qena, Egypt
- Died: April 27, 2015 (aged 82); Cairo, Egypt
- Education: Cairo University (BS, MS); University of Montpellier (PhD)
- Known for: Flora of Egypt
- Scientific career
- Fields: Botanist
- Institutions: Alexandria University
- Doctoral advisor: Louis Emberger

Loutfy Boulos Tawadros (May 14, 1932 – April 27, 2015) was an Egyptian botanist. He is known for his four-volume reference book Flora of Egypt, published from 1999 to 2005. Boulos has authored more than 100 papers and articles, and is credited as author or editor of 15 books. He has described many new genera and species. Atractylis boulosii and Fagonia boulosii are named in his honor.

== Career ==
He studied chemistry and botany at Cairo University. He earned his doctorate in botany from the University of Montpellier in 1963. His doctoral advisor was Louis Emberger. He was a professor of botany at the Alexandria University.

Boulos established the National Herbarium of Libya, the National Herbarium of Jordan and the National Herbarium of Kuwait.

== Select bibliography ==
- Medicinal plants of North Africa
- The Weed Flora of Egypt
- The Weed Flora of Kuwait
- Plant Diversity in Egypt
