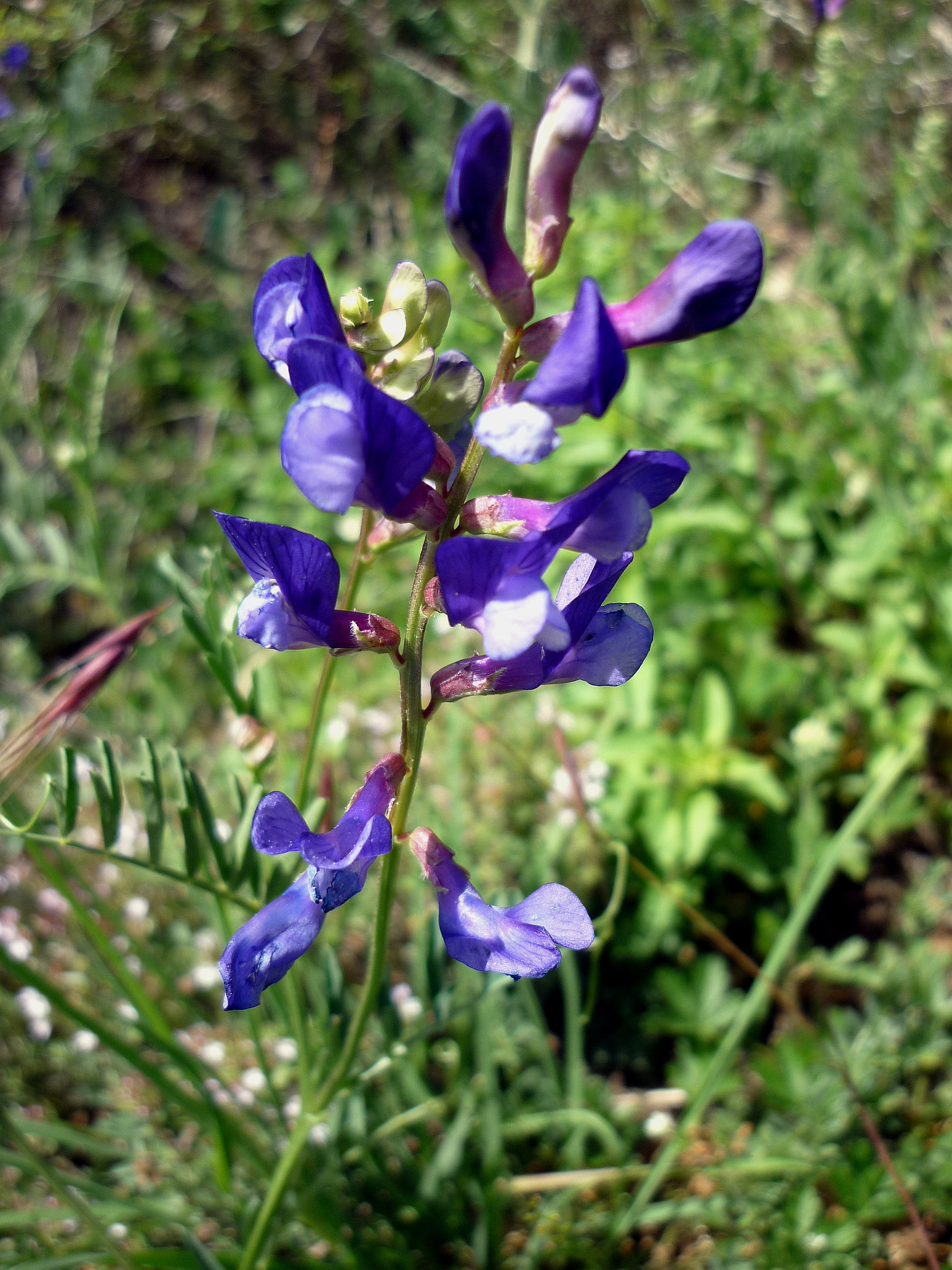

Scientific classification
- Kingdom: Plantae
- Clade: Embryophytes
- Clade: Tracheophytes
- Clade: Spermatophytes
- Clade: Angiosperms
- Clade: Eudicots
- Clade: Rosids
- Order: Fabales
- Family: Fabaceae
- Subfamily: Faboideae
- Genus: Vicia
- Species: V. onobrychioides

Binomial name
- Vicia onobrychioides (Linnaeus, 1753)

Synonyms
- Abacosa onobrychioides (L.) Alef., 1861; Vicia punctata Schleich. ex Pers. Vicia violacea Dulac, 1867

= Vicia onobrychioides =

Species of legume

Vicia onobrychioides, commonly known as the Saffoin vetch, is a species of flowering plant in the family Fabaceae. The species is native to southern Europe and northwestern Africa. The species has also been introduced in the Czech Republic, Slovakia, the Baltic States and the Kaliningrad Oblast.

The species contains the following subspecies:

- Vicia onobrychioides subsp. alborosea Dobignard
- Vicia onobrychioides subsp. onobrychioides
