= Vicia canescens =

Scientific classification
- Kingdom: Plantae
- Clade: Tracheophytes
- Clade: Angiosperms
- Clade: Eudicots
- Clade: Rosids
- Order: Fabales
- Family: Fabaceae
- Subfamily: Faboideae
- Tribe: Fabeae
- Genus: Vicia
- Species: V. canescens

Binomial name
- Vicia canescens Labill.

Synonyms
- Vicia rechingeri Chrtková

Species of plant

Vicia canescens is a species of legume in the vetch genus that is endemic to Lebanon.

== Description ==
An attractive and sturdy perennial plant, it grows 1 ft (30 cm) to 1.5 ft (46 cm) tall with 8 to 10 pairs of erect or ascending, densely hairy, subcanescent to sericeous leaves. The uppermost leaves may have short tendrils. The elliptic to linear-lanceolate leaves measure 5 to 40 mm in length with entire, semi-hastate stipules. The attractive inflorescence comprises a raceme with 3 to 18 closely arranged flowers with long stalks. The flowers are large, 17 to 25 mm long, lilac, or violet-blue with a 6 to 13 mm long, purple, scarcely gibbous calyx. The plant produces a villous, oblong fruit, 26–35 mm long and 7–11 mm wide, with ciliate sutures. The fruit contains several seeds.

== Distribution and habitat ==
Vicia canescens is endemic to the mountains of Mount-Lebanon.
