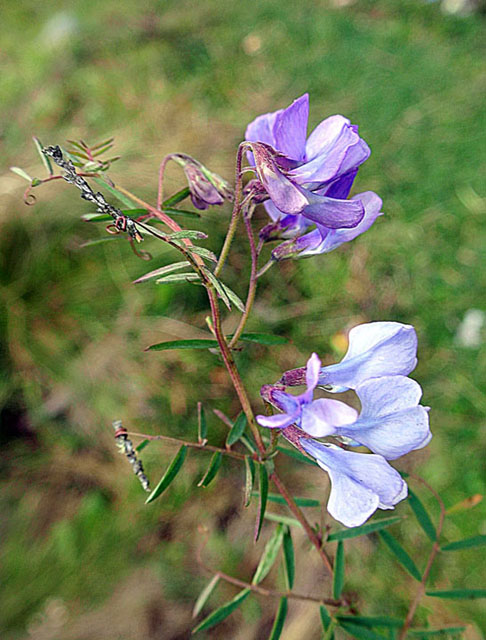

Scientific classification
- Kingdom: Plantae
- Clade: Tracheophytes
- Clade: Angiosperms
- Clade: Eudicots
- Clade: Rosids
- Order: Fabales
- Family: Fabaceae
- Subfamily: Faboideae
- Tribe: Fabeae
- Genus: Vicia
- Species: V. andicola

Binomial name
- Vicia andicola Kunth

= Vicia andicola =

Species of plant

Vicia andicola is a species of herb in the family Fabaceae. It is native to the Andes from Venezuela to northern Argentina but it is prominent in west coast countries of South America.
