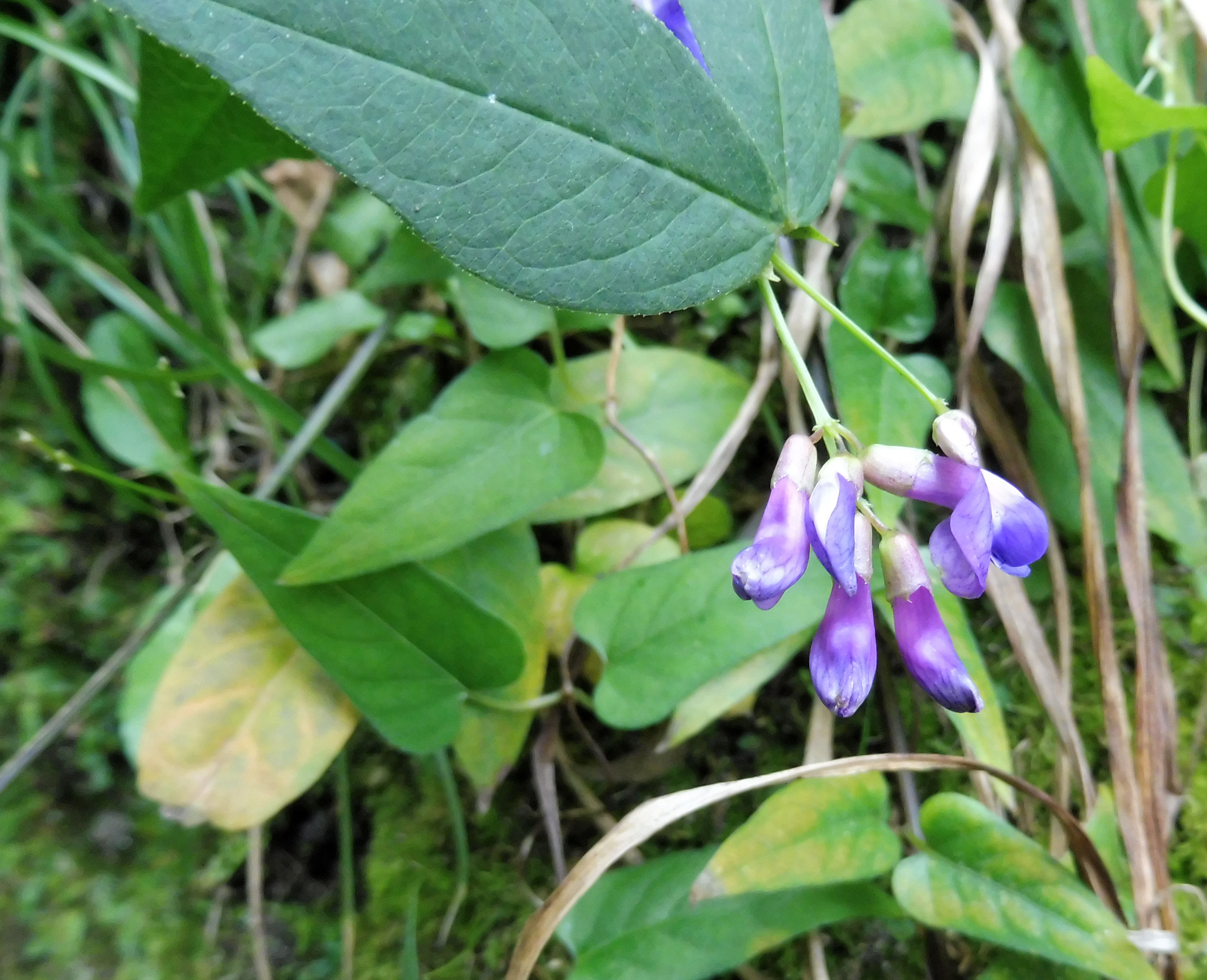

Scientific classification
- Kingdom: Plantae
- Clade: Tracheophytes
- Clade: Angiosperms
- Clade: Eudicots
- Clade: Rosids
- Order: Fabales
- Family: Fabaceae
- Subfamily: Faboideae
- Tribe: Fabeae
- Genus: Vicia
- Species: V. unijuga

Binomial name
- Vicia unijuga A.Braun

Synonyms
- Ervum unijugum (A.Braun) Alef. Lathyrus messerschmidii Franch. & Sav. Orobus lathyroides L. Vicia austrohigoensis Honda; Vicia linearifolia Y.N.Lee; Vicia unijuga var. austrohigoensis (Honda) Sugim. ex Yonek. Vicia unijuga subsp. minor (Nakai) Y.N.Lee; Vicia unijuga f. trifoliolata (Z.D.Xia) Y.Endo & H.Ohashi; Vicia unijuga var. trifoliolata Z.D.Xia; Vicia unijuga var. ulsaniana M.Kim & H.Jo; Vicia unijuga var. waldeniana S.Y.Hu

= Vicia unijuga =

Species of plant in the legume family

Vicia unijuga, commonly called two-leaf vetch, is a species of flowering plant in the legume family.

It is native to eastern Asia, where it is widespread, its range extending through China, Korea, Mongolia, Japan and Russia. It is very common in both China and Japan, and may be the most common species of Vicia in China. It is found in a variety of forested and open habitats.

It is a perennial that produces purple flowers in the summer and fall. This species contains a considerable amount of morphological variation, with some forms and varieties being named.

Vicia unijuga historically included the similar-looking Vicia ohwiana, which has now been given the rank of species.
