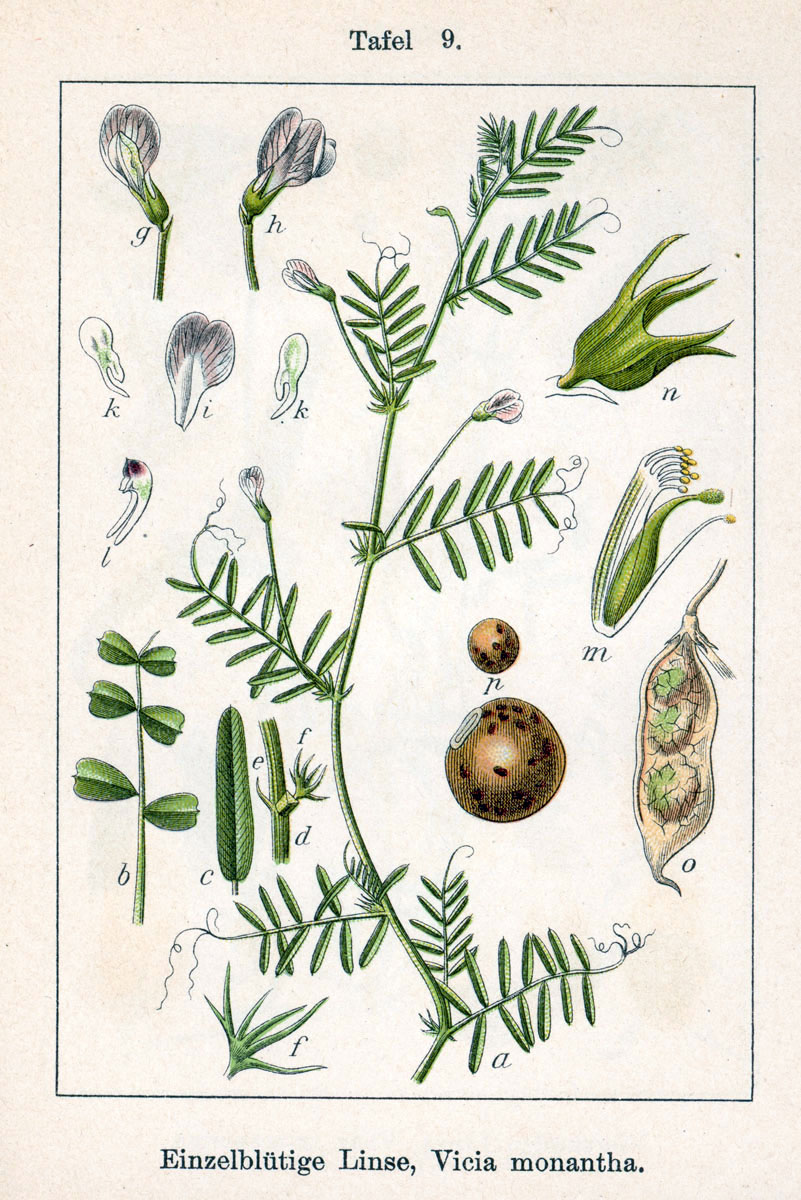

Scientific classification
- Kingdom: Plantae
- Clade: Tracheophytes
- Clade: Angiosperms
- Clade: Eudicots
- Clade: Rosids
- Order: Fabales
- Family: Fabaceae
- Subfamily: Faboideae
- Genus: Vicia
- Species: V. monantha

Binomial name
- Vicia monantha Retz.

Synonyms
- Vicia biflora

= Vicia monantha =

Species of plant

Vicia monantha, the barn vetch, is a widespread species of annual herb in the family Fabaceae. It native to the Mediterranean region, and western and central Asia, and has been introduced to Australia. Typical of vetches, it has a climbing habit and pinnate leaves.
