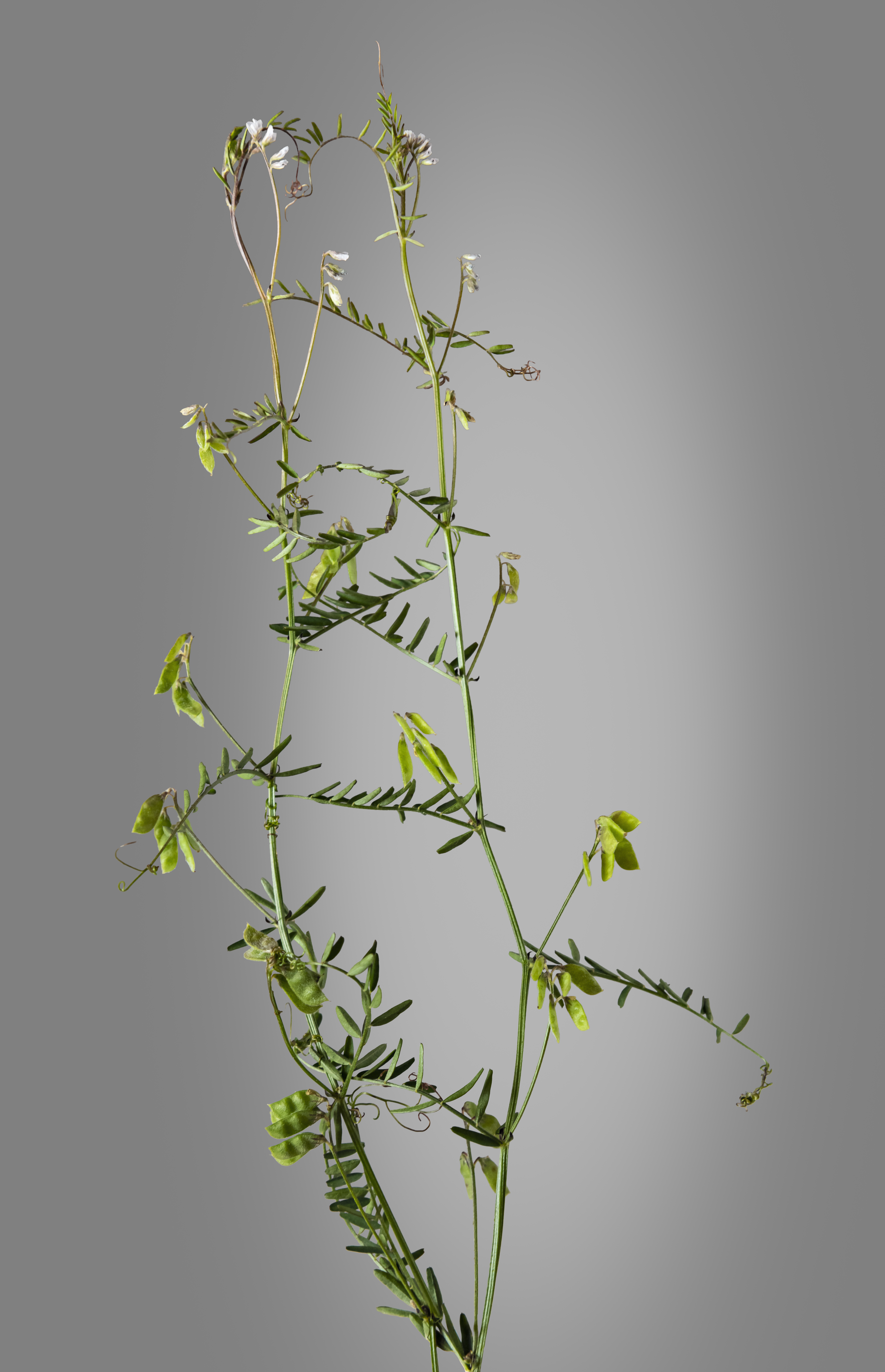

Scientific classification
- Kingdom: Plantae
- Clade: Tracheophytes
- Clade: Angiosperms
- Clade: Eudicots
- Clade: Rosids
- Order: Fabales
- Family: Fabaceae
- Subfamily: Faboideae
- Tribe: Fabeae
- Genus: Vicia
- Species: V. hirsuta

Binomial name
- Vicia hirsuta (L.) Gray

Synonyms
- Vicia parviflora Lapeyr. (non Cav.: preoccupied) Ervilia hirsuta (L) Opiz

= Vicia hirsuta =

Species of legume

Vicia hirsuta (syn. Ervilia hirsuta) (hairy tare, hairy vetch, tiny vetch) is a species of flowering plant in the pea and bean family Fabaceae.

== Description ==
It is an annual herb producing a slender, often four-sided, hairless to lightly hairy, climbing stem up to 70 to 90 centimeters tall, and known to well exceed one meter at times. The leaves are tipped with tendrils that support the plant as it climbs, and are made up of up to 10 pairs of elongated leaflets each up to 2 centimeters in length with notched, flat, sharply pointed, or toothed tips. The inflorescence is a raceme of up to 8 flowers borne near the tip and often on one side only. Each flower is whitish or pale blue, just a few millimeters in length, and short-lived. The fruit is a legume pod up to a centimeter long by half a centimeter wide and hairy, often densely so. It is pale green to nearly black in color and contains usually two seeds.

== Distribution ==
It is native to Europe and Western Asia. It can be found on other continents as an introduced species. For example, hairy vetch is commonly used in cover crops and green manures on farms in North America. Typically, common vetch or hairy vetch provides the leguminous component of the crop, usually comingled with a grassy component as a nurse crop and an addition of more cellulose to the resultant organic matter (for example, rye or winter wheat). The species Vicia villosa is also called hairy vetch.
