= Vicia nana =

Scientific classification
- Kingdom: Plantae
- Clade: Tracheophytes
- Clade: Angiosperms
- Clade: Eudicots
- Clade: Rosids
- Order: Fabales
- Family: Fabaceae
- Subfamily: Faboideae
- Genus: Vicia
- Species: V. nana

Binomial name
- Vicia nana Vogel

Synonyms
- Vicia dentata Hook. Vicia valdiviana Phil.

Species of legume

Vicia nana is a flowering plant species in the genus Vicia found in South America.
