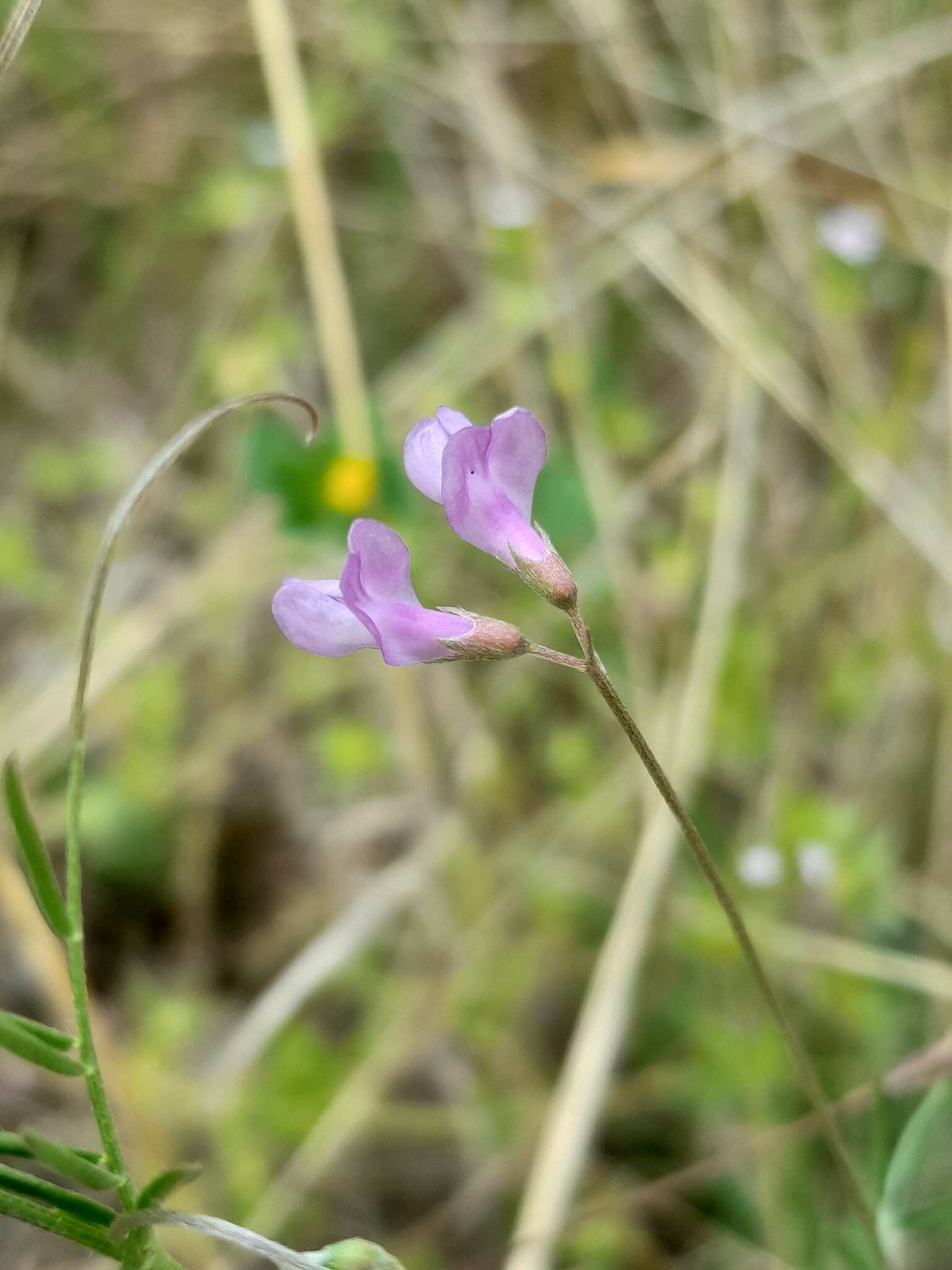

Scientific classification
- Kingdom: Plantae
- Clade: Tracheophytes
- Clade: Angiosperms
- Clade: Eudicots
- Clade: Rosids
- Order: Fabales
- Family: Fabaceae
- Subfamily: Faboideae
- Genus: Vicia
- Species: V. parviflora

Binomial name
- Vicia parviflora Cav.

Synonyms
- Vicia tenuissima

= Vicia parviflora =

Species of plant

Vicia parviflora, the slender vetch, is a species of annual herb in the family Fabaceae. They are climbers and have compound, broad leaves. Individuals can grow to 0.24 m.

== Sources ==
This article incorporates text from a free content work. Licensed under CC0 (license statement/permission). Text taken from Vicia tenuissima. Encyclopedia of Life.
