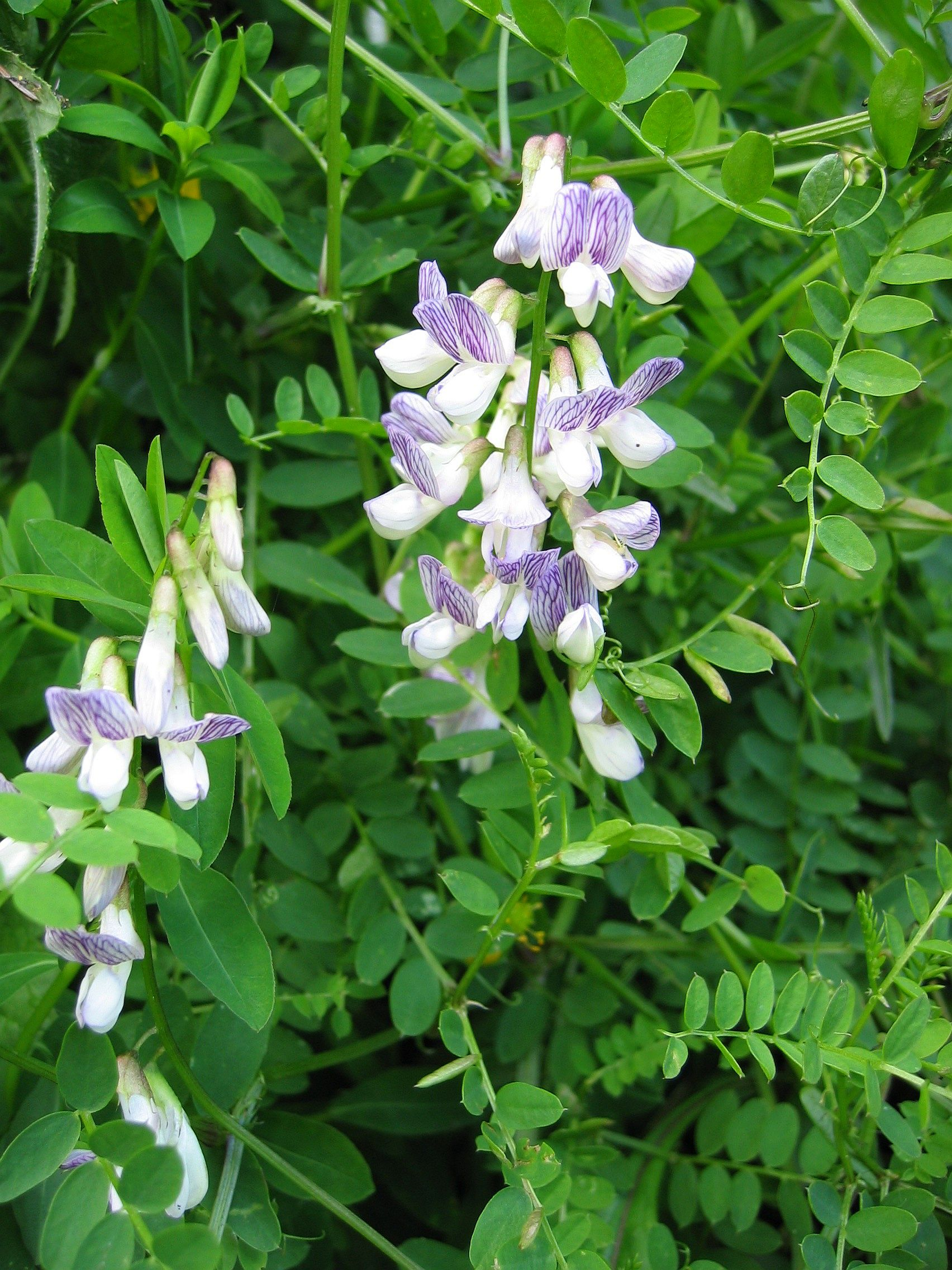

Scientific classification
- Kingdom: Plantae
- Clade: Tracheophytes
- Clade: Angiosperms
- Clade: Eudicots
- Clade: Rosids
- Order: Fabales
- Family: Fabaceae
- Subfamily: Faboideae
- Tribe: Fabeae
- Genus: Vicia
- Species: V. sylvatica

Binomial name
- Vicia sylvatica L.

Synonyms
- Ervilia sylvatica (L.) Schur

= Vicia sylvatica =

Species of flowering plant

Vicia sylvatica (syn. Ervilia sylvatica), known as wood vetch, is a species of flowering plant in the bean family Fabaceae. It was described by Carl Linnaeus.

== Description ==
This species is a herbaceous perennial with climbing stems. The leaves have 4 to 12 pairs of leaflets and end in branched tendrils. The flowers are 15 to 20 mm long arranged in racemes of up to 18 flowers. The petals are white with purple veins and the fruit is a pod or legume with 4 to 5 seeds.

== Habitat ==
It is found in woods, on rocky ground and scree.

== Distribution ==
This species has been recorded in much of Ireland.
