= Louis Emberger =

French botanist (1897–1969)

- Born: 23 January 1897; Thann, Haut-Rhin, France
- Died: 30 November 1969 (aged 72); Saint-Sulpice, Savoie, France
- Education: University of Lyon
- Scientific career
- Fields: Botany
- Workplaces: University of Montpellier
- Doctoral advisor: Marie Antoine Alexandre Guilliermond
- Doctoral students: Loutfy Boulos
- Author abbrev. (botany): Emb.

Marie Louis Emberger (23 January 1897 – 30 November 1969) was a French botanist and phytogeographer. He worked at the University of Montpellier.

== Life ==
Emberger was born at Thann, in Haut-Rhin, France in 1897, which was then part of German occupied Alsace. He developed an interest in Natural History, exploring the Rhine plain of Alsace, and the nearby Vosges mountains. At the age of 17, to avoid conscription into the German army, he escaped to Lyon, in France. There he began studies in biologie at the University of Lyon, and obtained a degree in sciences naturelles in 1918. He obtained his doctorate under Professor Marie Antoine Alexandre Guilliermond, then head of the Department of Agricultural Botany, at Lyon. Following his studies, his first position was as an organic chemistry technician in the Faculty of Medicine and Pharmacy. There he produced his first publication in 1919 in the Bulletin de la Société Botanique de France, an account of his exploration at Grande Chartreuse. He began working as a pharmacist in 1920 and within a year had had six papers presented at the Académie des Sciences by Gaston Bonnier. In 1921 he was appointed as a lecturer in the Faculty of Pharmacy at the University of Montpellier. Within five years he had been appointed head of the botany department at the Institut scientifique de Rabat in Morocco (1926–1936). Returning to France he was, for a short time, professor at the Faculty of Science at Clermont-Ferrand, before once more taking a position in Montpellier, succeeding his step-father, Charles Flahault as head of the botany department (Directeur de l'Institut botanique de l'Université et du Centre d'Etudes phytosocio-logiques de Montpellier). There he worked closely with Josias Braun-Blanquet, also a student of Flahault. He remained in that position until his death at St Sulpice in Savoie in 1969.

== Work ==
Emberger's scientific contributions cover four main areas of research, cytology, biogeography, comparative morphology and phylogeny, and biosystematics. His cytological work focussed on the ferns, horsetails, and the lycopods. His biogeographical work concentrated on the vegetation of the Mediterranean basin and in particular the western High Atlas region of Morocco. He published work on the distribution and classification of Moroccan flora, in particular, halfah grass (Stipa tenacissima). His Moroccan work also included studies on the altitudinal zonation of the mountain regions there and the phytogeography of the desert climate, in particular the argan tree (Argania spinosa). Other work included studies of association in equatorial forests, which led to a biogeographical classification of climate, in which he drew comparisons between Australia and homologous zones of the Mediterranean. In biosystematics he developed a classification scheme for vascular plants.

== Selected publications ==
- Braun-Blanquet, Josias; Emberger, Louis; Molinier, René (1947). Instructions pour l'établissement de la carte des groupements végétaux (in French). Montpellier: Causse, Graille, Castelnau.
- Emberger, Marie Louis; Maire, René-Charles-Joseph-Ernest (1929). Plantae maroccanae novae vel minus cognitae (in Latin). Rabat: Imprimerie de Lunéville.
- Emberger, Louis; Font-Quer, Pío; Maire, René-Charles-Joseph-Ernest (1928). La végétation de l'Atlas rifain occidental (in French). Paris: Société de biogéographie.
- Chaudefaud, Marius; Emberger, Louis (1960). Traité de Botanique systématique 2 vols (in French). Paris: Masson.

see also Taxon. Lit., ed. 2 (TL2),

== Legacy ==
Louis Embeerger is the authority for 168 taxa, such as Agropyron pseudofestucoides Emb.

== Bibliography ==
- Stafleu, Frans A.; Cowan, Richard S. (1976). "Emberger, Louis". Taxonomic literature: a selective guide to botanical publications and collections with dates, commentaries and types. Vol. 1. A–G (2nd ed.). Utrecht: Bohn, Scheltema & Holkema. pp. 329–332. ISBN 978-3-904144-17-9.
- Emberger, L (1971). Travaux de botanique et d'écologie: choisis et présentés par les soins d'un groupe de ses amis et élèves à l'occasion de son jubilé scientifique. Paris: Masson.
- Jaeger, Paul; Ochsenbein, Gonthier (1982–2003). "Emberger, Louis Marie". In Baechler, Charles; Kintz, Jean-Pierre (eds.). Nouveau dictionnaire de biographie alsacienne. Vol. 9. Fédération des sociétés d'histoire et d'archéologie d'Alsace. p. 795.
- Dahlgren, Rolf; Clifford, H. T. (1982). The monocotyledons: A comparative study. London and New York: Academic Press. ISBN 9780122006807.
- Wit, Hendrik C. D. de (1994) [1982]. Histoire du developpement de la biologie. translated by A. Baudiere. Originally published by Pudoc, Wagengigen, Netherlands as Ontwikkelingsgeschiedenis. Lausanne: Presses polytechniques et universitaires romandes. ISBN 9782880742645.
- Mangenot, G. (1972). "Louis Emberger (1897–1969)". Bulletin de la Société Botanique de France. 119 (Sup. 3): 7–14. Bibcode:1972BSBF..119S...7M. doi:10.1080/00378941.1972.10839127.
- Marres, Paul (1972). "Louis Emberger, 1897-1969". Annales de Géographie. 81 (448): 748–751. Bibcode:1972BSBF..119S...7M. doi:10.1080/00378941.1972.10839127.
- Buvat, Roger (15 June 1970). "Notice nécrologique sur M. Louis Emberger, Correspondant de la section de Botanique" (PDF). Comptes Rendus de l'Académie des Sciences de Paris. 270: 132–137.
- "Emberger, Marie Louis". Harvard University Herbaria & Libraries: Index of Botanists. 2015.
- "Tropicos". Missouri Botanical Garden. 2015.
- "Emberger, Louis". Ville de Thann: Personnalités illustres (in French). Archived from the original on 2 February 2017.
