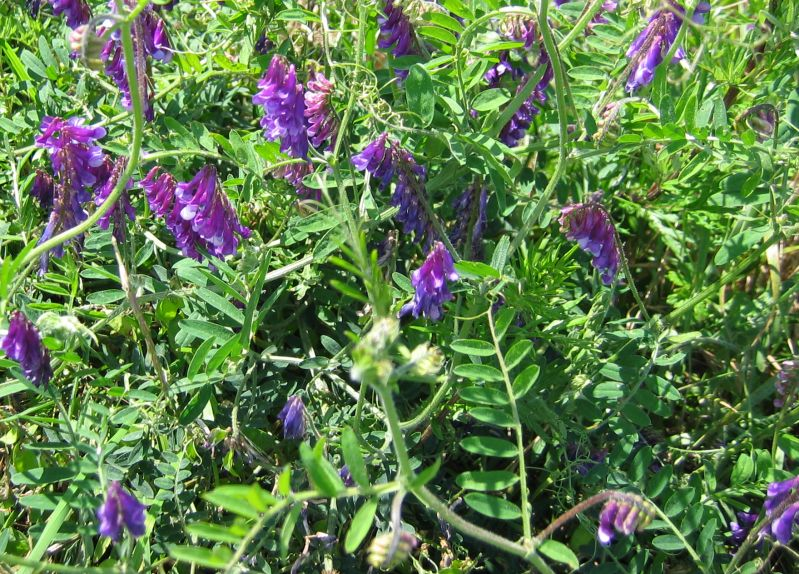

Scientific classification
- Kingdom: Plantae
- Clade: Tracheophytes
- Clade: Angiosperms
- Clade: Eudicots
- Clade: Rosids
- Order: Fabales
- Family: Fabaceae
- Subfamily: Faboideae
- Genus: Vicia
- Species: V. villosa

Binomial name
- Vicia villosa Roth

Synonyms
- List: Cracca villosa (Roth) Gren. & Godr. (1848); Ervum villosum (Roth) Trautv. (1874); Vicia godronii Rouy (1899); Vicia unguiculata Clavaud ex Bonnier & Layens (1894); Vicia unguiculata subsp. villosa (Roth) Bonnier & Layens (1894); Vicia varia subsp. villosa (Roth) H.J.Coste (1906)

= Vicia villosa =

Hairy vetch

Plant species in the pea family

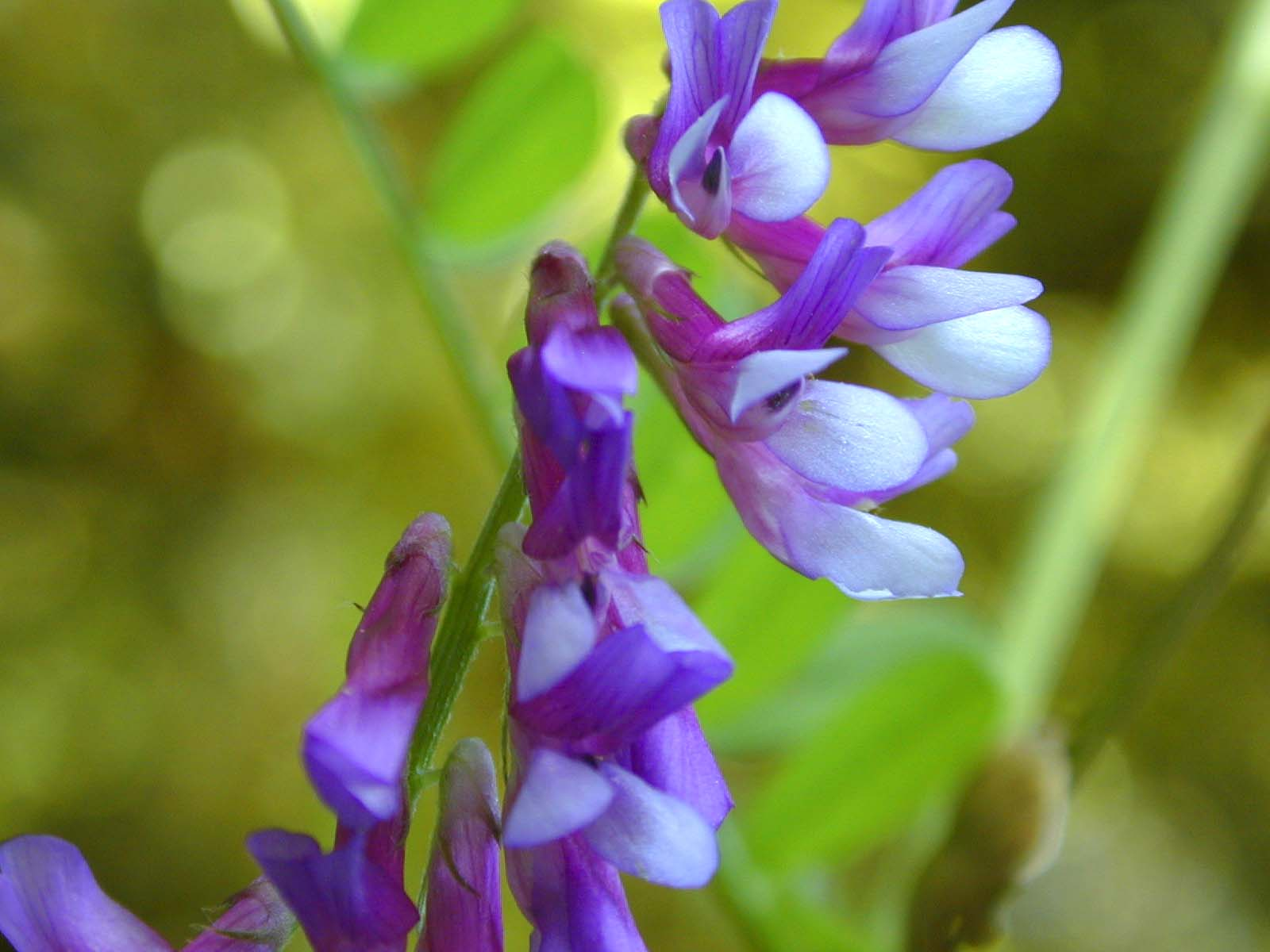
Hairy vetch (Vicia villosa), Monte Bello Open Space Preserve, California

Vicia villosa, known as the hairy vetch, fodder vetch or winter vetch, is a plant native to some of Europe and western Asia. It is a legume, grown as a forage crop, fodder crop, cover crop, and green manure. Although non-native, it occurs in all US states and is considered invasive by some states, such as Alaska, Florida, Georgia, Kansas, Michigan, Minnesota, Nebraska, Oregon, and Washington state — as well as in Japan and some parts of Europe where it is not native. It is also found in most Canadian provinces.

Hairy vetch is very similar to tufted vetch (Vicia cracca), the most noticeable difference being that tufted vetch has a smooth stem.

Several subspecies are recognized:

- Vicia villosa ssp. ambigua (Guss.) Kerguelen (= ssp. elegantissima, ssp. pseudocracca)
- Vicia villosa ssp. eriocarpa (Hausskn.) P.W.Ball
- Vicia villosa ssp. microphylla (d'Urv.) P.W.Ball
- Vicia villosa ssp. varia (Host) Corb. (= ssp. dasycarpa)
- Vicia villosa ssp. villosa

The species Vicia hirsuta is also called hairy vetch.

== Cultivation ==
Hairy vetch is widely used by organic growers in the United States as a winter cover crop and in no-till farming, as it is both winter hardy and can fix as much as 200 lb/acre of atmospheric nitrogen. Disadvantages of hairy vetch in production agriculture are related to the crop having a portion of hard seed and its tendency to shatter seed early in the season, leading to it remaining in the field as a weed later in the season. This can be a particular problem in wheat production.

== Companion plant ==
Organic gardeners often plant hairy vetch (a nitrogen-fixing legume) as a companion plant to tomatoes, as an alternative to rotating crops in small growing areas. When it is time to plant tomatoes in the spring, the hairy vetch is cut to the ground and the tomato seedlings are planted in holes dug through the matted residue and stubble. The vetch vegetation provides both nitrogen and an instant mulch that preserves moisture and keeps weeds from sprouting.

== Alien or invasive species ==
It is regulated in the state of Florida. Some sources consider it generally invasive in areas with suitable climate for it to out-compete native species, in a manner similar to how cow vetch, Vicia cracca, is regarded. With both vetches, their agricultural usefulness is typically given precedence over concerns regarding potential ecological degradation. Despite being native to part of Europe it is considered an alien or invasive species in some European countries, such as Belgium, the Czech Republic, France, Germany, Italy, Poland, and Spain.

== See also ==
- Vicia spp. (vetch)
- List of companion plants
