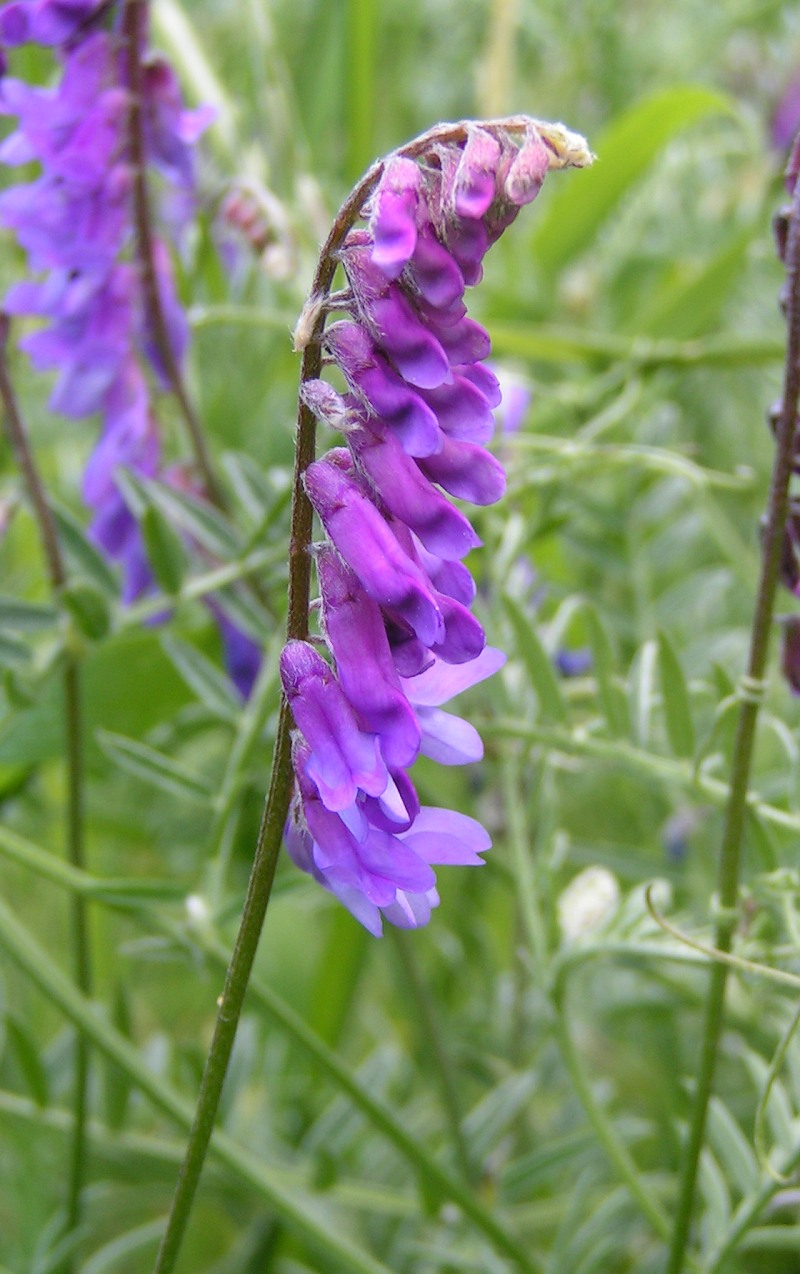

Scientific classification
- Kingdom: Plantae
- Clade: Tracheophytes
- Clade: Angiosperms
- Clade: Eudicots
- Clade: Rosids
- Order: Fabales
- Family: Fabaceae
- Subfamily: Faboideae
- Tribe: Fabeae
- Genus: Vicia
- Species: V. cracca

Binomial name
- Vicia cracca L.

= Vicia cracca =

Species of flowering plant

Vicia cracca (tufted vetch, cow vetch, bird vetch, blue vetch, boreal vetch), is a species of flowering plant in the pea and bean family Fabaceae. It is native to Europe and Asia. It occurs on other continents as an introduced species, including North America, where it is a common weed. It often occurs in disturbed habitats, including old fields and roadside ditches.

== Description ==
Cow vetch is in the family Fabaceae and similar to a pea in growth habit with climbing stems growing to 150 cm long, perennial, sending out noose-like branched tendrils from the tips of its leaves when it contacts another plant and securely fastens itself. This can cause "strangling" of smaller plants. An individual plant may reach a length (or height) of 2 m with a white taproot, which may extend up to 1 m. The leaves are 3–8 cm long, pinnate, with 8–12 pairs of leaflets, each leaflet 5–10 mm long.

The plant is fast-growing and flowers prolifically, sending out 10 to 40 flowered one-sided racemes cascading pea-flower shaped purple to violet flowers from the leaf axil during its late spring to late summer flowering period. The flowers are mostly visited by bumblebees; when the flowers drop off and tiny bright green seed pods 10–20 mm long, start to form. Cow vetch is very similar to hairy vetch (Vicia villosa), but is distinguished from the latter by its smooth stem.

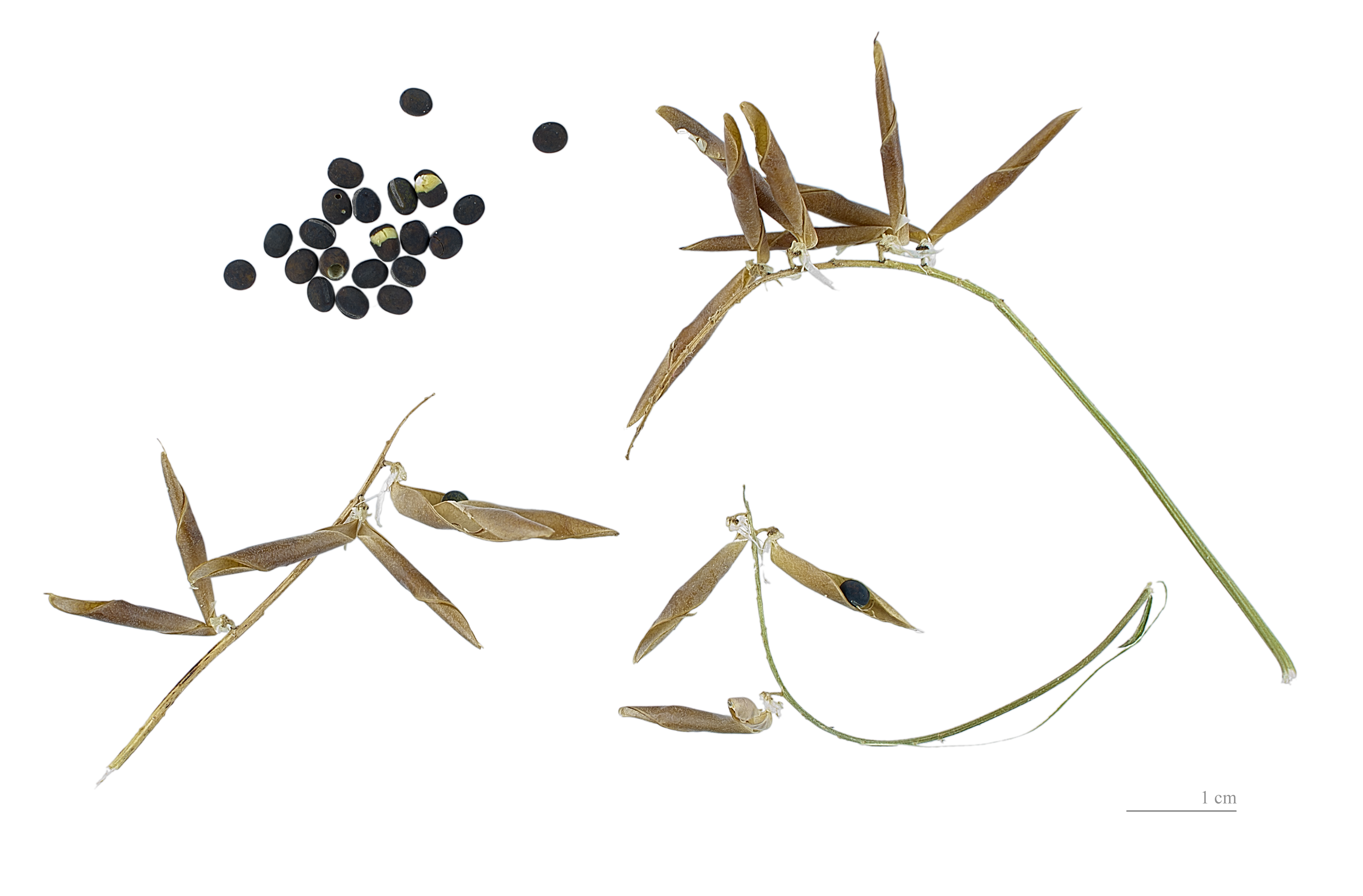
Legumes and seeds

The seed pods are 2 cm long and contain 6 to 8 seeds. They resemble those of a very small pea. The tiny seeds within are ripe when the pods have turned black. Unripened seeds are swollen and have a green tint to them, but they unswell when they become ripe. The seed pods vary from light brown to dark brown with black spots.

== Distribution ==
Vicia cracca is native to Europe and Asia, and has been introduced to large areas of North America.

== Habitat ==
Recorded as very frequent on waste ground as an introduced species occurring casually. In hedges and waste places.

== Cultivation and uses ==
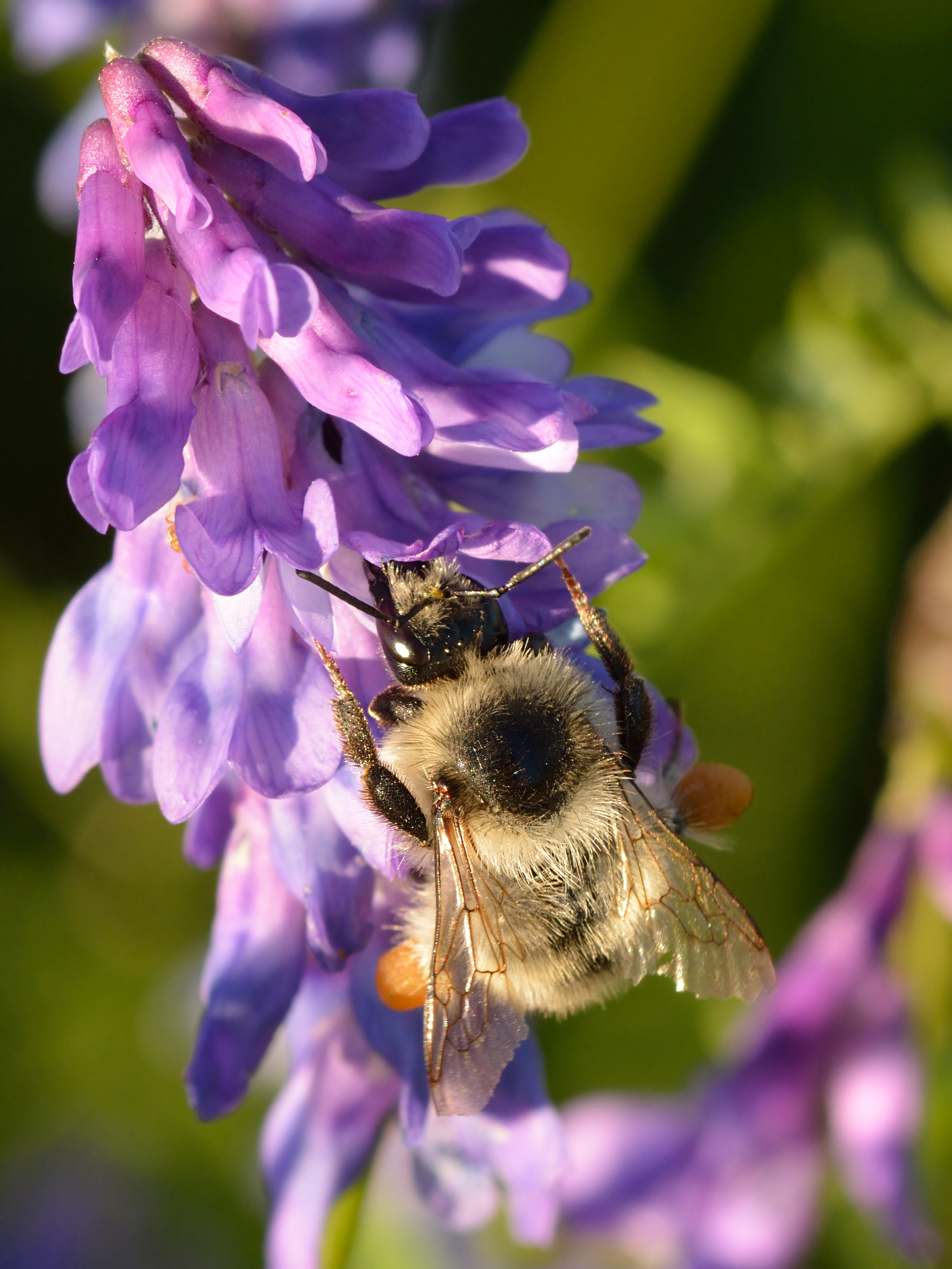
With Bombus sylvarum

Cow vetch is widely used as a forage crop for cattle, and is beneficial to other plants because, like other leguminous plants, it enriches the soil in which it grows by its nitrogen-fixing properties. Cow vetch is also much appreciated by bees and butterflies as a source of nectar. The plant may also be used to curb erosion.

Owners of pet birds such as budgerigars often use cow vetch as a nutritious food; the birds are especially fond of the seeds but may also eat the foliage.

Its utility as a cover crop and source of green manure has encouraged the introduction and naturalisation of cow vetch far beyond its native range. In North America the plant is naturalised from southern Canada to upstate South Carolina; it is considered an invasive weed in some areas and its sale may be regulated.

Cow vetch can be a potentially detrimental species in areas where it is not native. The vetch may crowd out native plants, especially in areas of disturbed soil where the vetch may dominate before other plants have a chance to take hold. This is especially a concern in prairie and other natural habitat restoration or land reclamation projects in North America.
