= Tulipa cuspidata =

Tulipa cuspidata can refer to:

- Tulipa cuspidata Regel, a synonym of Tulipa sylvestris subsp. primulina (Baker) Maire & Weiller
- Tulipa cuspidata Stapf, a synonym of Tulipa systola Stapf
