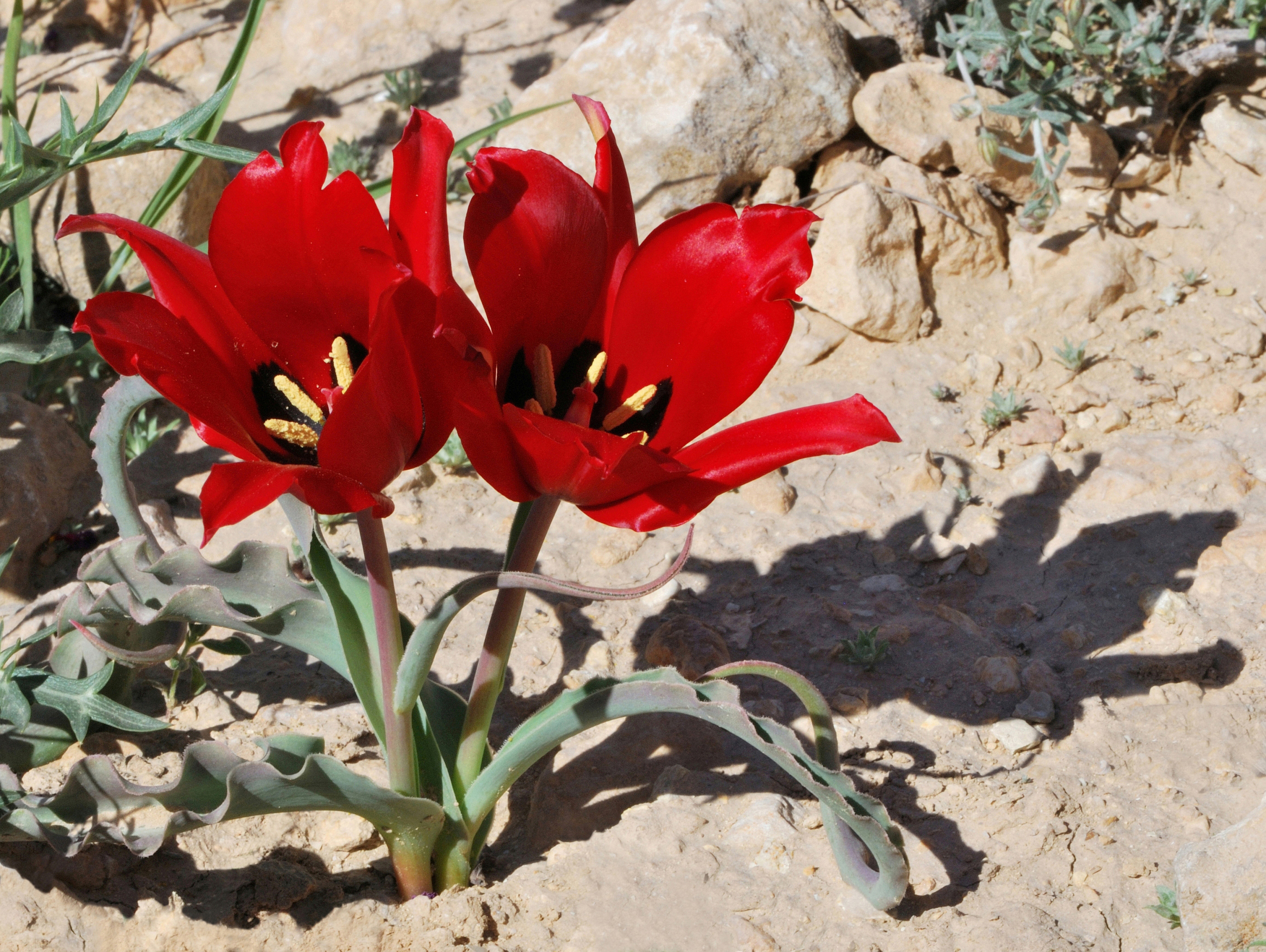
- Flowering in the Negev, Israel

Scientific classification
- Kingdom: Plantae
- Clade: Embryophytes
- Clade: Tracheophytes
- Clade: Spermatophytes
- Clade: Angiosperms
- Clade: Monocots
- Order: Liliales
- Family: Liliaceae
- Subfamily: Lilioideae
- Genus: Tulipa
- Species: T. systola

Binomial name
- Tulipa systola Stapf

Synonyms
- List: Tulipa cuspidata Stapf; Tulipa florenskyi Woronow; Tulipa levieri Sprenger; Tulipa stapfii Turrill; Tulipa straussii Bornm.; Tulipa sultanabadensis Sprenger

= Tulipa systola =

Species of flowering plant

Tulipa systola, the desert tulip, is a species of tulip native to the Middle East; Sinai, the Levant, Anatolia, Iraq and Iran. A geophyte adapted to arid conditions, it can remain dormant or produce only leaves in bad years based on environmental cues.
