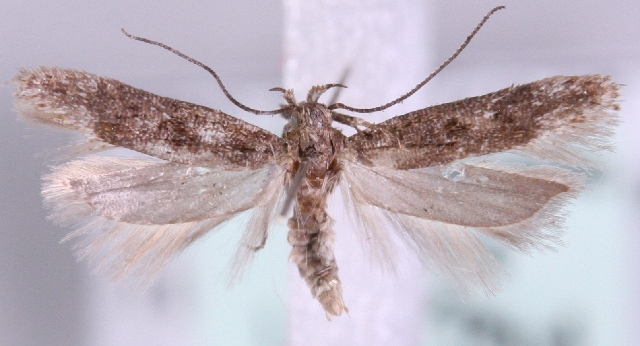
- Scrobipalpa salinella salicorniae

Scientific classification
- Kingdom: Animalia
- Phylum: Arthropoda
- Clade: Pancrustacea
- Class: Insecta
- Order: Lepidoptera
- Family: Gelechiidae
- Genus: Scrobipalpa
- Species: S. salinella

Binomial name
- Scrobipalpa salinella (Zeller, 1847)

Synonyms
- Gelechia salinella Zeller, 1847; Scrobipalpa trebujenae Povolný, 1977; Lita salicorniae E. Hering, 1889; Scrobipalpa salicorniae; Lita zernyella Rebel, 1918; Gnorimoschema corsicanum Gregor & Povolný, 1954; Gnorimoschema ignotum Gregor & Povolný, 1954; Lita caliacrae Caradja, 1932

= Scrobipalpa salinella =

Species of moth

Scrobipalpa salinella, the sea-aster groundling, is a moth of the family Gelechiidae. It is found Europe, along the coast and in inland halophytic habitats. In the east, the range extends through Siberia and Central Asia to Mongolia. It is also found in North Africa.

The wingspan is 11–15 mm (0.43–0.59 in). Adults have been recorded on wing from June to September.

The larvae feed on Salicornia fruticosa (syn. Arthrocnemum fruticosum), Arthrocaulon macrostachyum (syn. Arthrocnemum macrostachyum) and Salicornia europaea. They mine the leaves of their host plant.

== Subspecies ==
- Scrobipalpa salinella salinella
- Scrobipalpa salinella salicorniae (E. Hering, 1889) (coasts of northern Europe, Central Europe, southern Urals)

Scrobipalpa salicorniae is sometimes considered a distinct species. Other authors treat salicorniae as a northern subspecies, living on Salicornia, while the southern (typical) subspecies feeds on former Arthrocnemum species.
