= Arthrocnemum =

Genus of flowering plants

Arthrocnemum was a genus of shrubs in the family Amaranthaceae. Two or three species were included in the genus. They are halophytes with fleshy, apparently articulated plant stems and reduced leaves and flowers.

== Description ==
Species formerly placed in Arthrocnemum are low shrubs up to 1.5 metres (5 ft), much branched from base, and often forming mats. Young stems are succulent, glaucous (sometimes yellowish), glabrous, and appear to be articulated. The opposite leaves are sessile, joined at base and forming a cup around the stem, fleshy, glabrous, their blades reduced to small, cuspidate scales up to 5 mm.

The spike-like inflorescences stand terminal on lateral branches, they are not branched or with short lateral branches. Cymes of three flowers are sitting in the axils of fleshy, opposite bracts. The flowers are bisexual (sometimes the stamens of the lateral flowers mey be missing) and proterandric. The central flower is four-angled, the two lateral flowers are three-angled. The perianth consists of 3–4 joined tepals usually concrescent to the apex, these are directed upwards and protrude the length of the bracts by up to one-third to one-half. They consist of several layers of parenchymatous, thin-walled cells with some scattered lignified cells, but are never completely indurated. There are 1–2 stamens exserting the flower, 0.8–1.3 mm, and a conical ovary with two stigmas.

The fruit wall (pericarp) is parenchymatous, thick and few-layered in the upper part and thinning in the lower part. The seed is reddish when unripe, becoming black. The seed coat is crustaceous, mostly with papillose, conic outgrowths along one side. The vertical embryo is curved (comma-shaped). The seed contains copious perisperm (feeding tissue).

== Systematics ==
The genus Arthrocnemum was first published in 1840 by Alfred Moquin-Tandon. As a type is not yet given, the genus will be typified with a conserved name. The genus was considered to be distinct, either via phylogenetic research published in 2006 or by the morphology of its species' fruit. A study in 2017 did not uphold this conclusion, and species formerly placed in the genus were divided between two new genera, Arthrocaulon and Arthroceras.

Former species include:

- Arthrocnemum franzii Sukhor., now Arthrocaulon franzii – native to western tropical Africa: Cape Verde on the islands Sal, Maio and Boa Vista
- Arthrocnemum macrostachyum (Moric.) K.Koch, now Arthrocaulon macrostachyum – widely distributed in the Mediterranean region, Macaronesia, northern Sahara, and Southwest Asia.
- Arthrocnemum subterminale (Parish) Standl., now Arthroceras subterminale – native to North America: in California and Mexico
