= Coleophora minimella =

Scientific classification
- Kingdom: Animalia
- Phylum: Arthropoda
- Class: Insecta
- Order: Lepidoptera
- Family: Coleophoridae
- Genus: Coleophora
- Species: C. minimella

Binomial name
- Coleophora minimella Toll, 1952

Species of moth

Coleophora minimella is a moth of the family Coleophoridae. It is found in Algeria and Egypt.

The larvae feed on Kalidium, Halostachis and Halocnemum species. They feed on the assimilation shoots of their host plant.
