= Scrobipalpa selectella =

Scientific classification
- Kingdom: Animalia
- Phylum: Arthropoda
- Class: Insecta
- Order: Lepidoptera
- Family: Gelechiidae
- Genus: Scrobipalpa
- Species: S. selectella

Binomial name
- Scrobipalpa selectella (Caradja, 1920)

Synonyms
- Gelechia selectella Caradja, 1920; Scrobipalpa fraterna Povolný, 1969

Species of moth

Scrobipalpa selectella is a moth in the family Gelechiidae. It was described by Aristide Caradja in 1920. It is found in Tunisia, Greece, Turkey, Uralsk, Ukraine, Kazakhstan, China (Hebei, Inner Mongolia, Ningxia, Tianjin, Xinjiang) and Mongolia.

The length of the forewings is about 7 mm (0.28 in).

The larvae feed on Halostachys belangeriana and Halocnemum strobilaceum.
