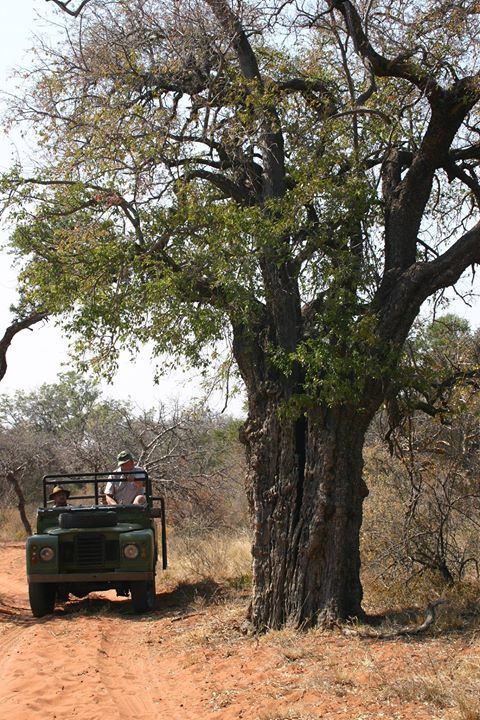
- Spirostachys africana

Scientific classification
- Kingdom: Plantae
- Clade: Tracheophytes
- Clade: Angiosperms
- Clade: Eudicots
- Clade: Rosids
- Order: Malpighiales
- Family: Euphorbiaceae
- Subfamily: Euphorbioideae
- Tribe: Hippomaneae
- Subtribe: Hippomaninae
- Genus: Spirostachys; Sond. 1850 not Ung.-Sternb. 1866 nor Sternb. ex S. Wats. 1874, both of the latter in Amaranthaceae

Synonyms
- Excoecariopsis Pax

= Spirostachys =

Genus of flowering plants

Spirostachys is a plant genus of the family Euphorbiaceae first described as a genus in 1850. It is native to Africa.

The genus name is derived from Ancient Greek speiros = spiral, stachys = spike, in allusion to the spiral arrangement of the florets on the flower spike.

Species

1. Spirostachys africana Sond. - E + SE + S Africa (Kenya, Tanzania, Mozambique, Angola, Zimbabwe, Botswana, Namibia, Swaziland, Limpopo, Mpumalanga, KwaZulu-Natal, Cape Province)
2. Spirostachys venenifera (Pax) Pax - Somalia, Kenya, Tanzania

formerly included

moved to other genera (Excoecaria Spegazziniophytum )

1. Spirostachys madagascariensis, syn of Excoecaria madagascariensis
2. Spirostachys patagonica, syn of Spegazziniophytum patagonicum

names in Amaranthaceae

The same genus name, Spirostachys, was used twice to name genera in the Amaranthaceae. Thus were created two illegitimate homonyms, unacceptable according to the rules of nomenclature. The species assigned to these genera have been placed in the genera Allenrolfea and Heterostachys, as follows:

1. Spirostachys occidentalis (S. Watson) S. Watson 1874, now Allenrolfea occidentalis (S.Watson) Kuntze
2. Spirostachys olivascens Speg. 1902, now Heterostachys olivascens (Speg.) Molfino
3. Spirostachys ritteriana (Moq.) Ung.-Sternb. 1866, now Heterostachys ritteriana (Moq.) Ung.-Sternb.
4. Spirostachys vaginata Griseb. 1874, now Allenrolfea vaginata (Griseb.) Kuntze
5. Spirostachys vaginata Benth. & Hook.f. - unresolved
