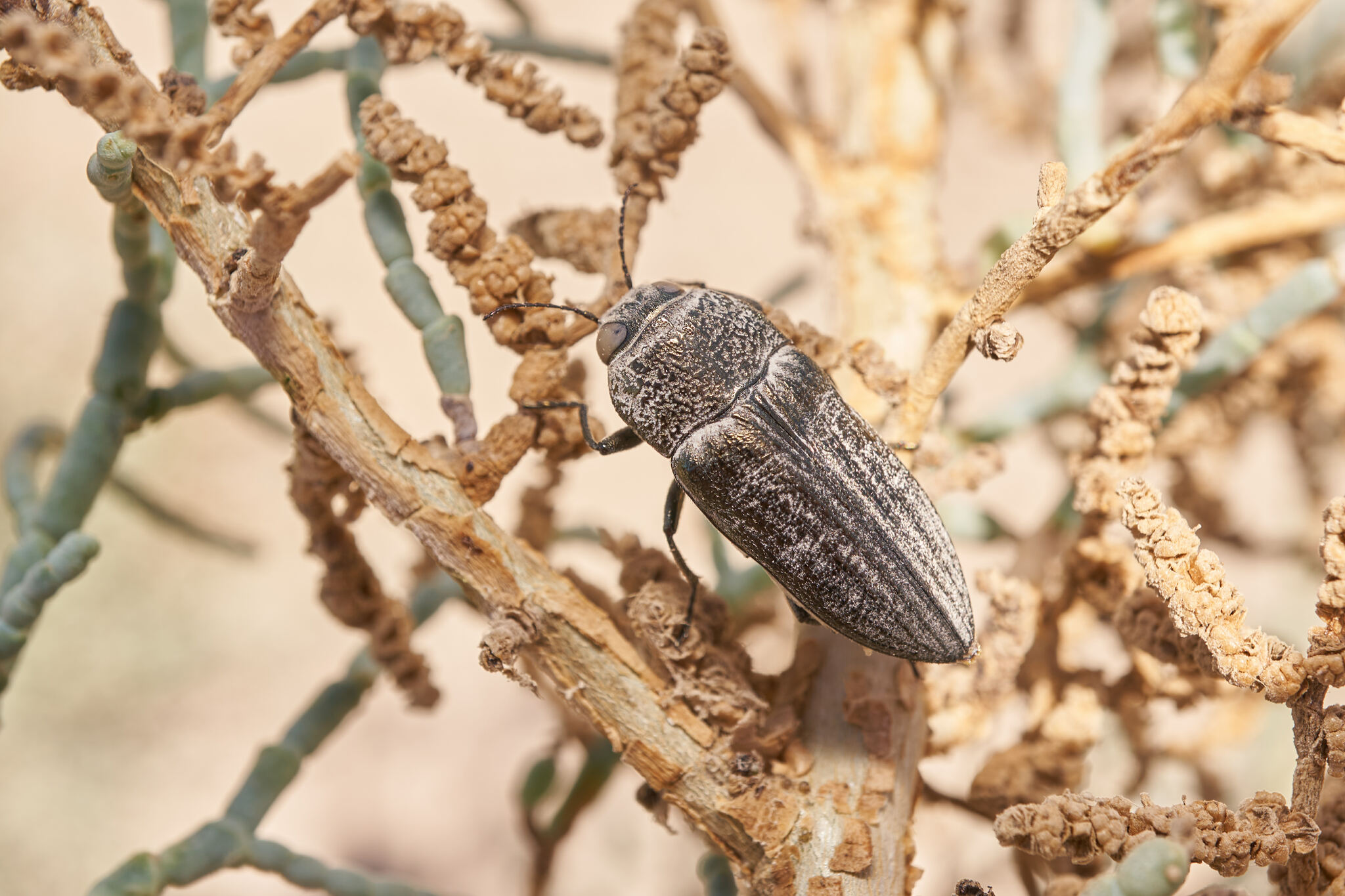

Scientific classification
- Kingdom: Animalia
- Phylum: Arthropoda
- Class: Insecta
- Order: Coleoptera
- Suborder: Polyphaga
- Infraorder: Elateriformia
- Family: Buprestidae
- Genus: Gyascutus
- Species: G. allenrolfeae

Binomial name
- Gyascutus allenrolfeae (Verity, 1978)

Synonyms
- Hippomelas allenrolfeae Verity, 1978

= Gyascutus allenrolfeae =

Species of beetle

Gyascutus allenrolfeae is a large species of buprestid metallic wood-boring beetle endemic to the Sonoran Desert.

== Description ==
Gyascutus allenrolfeae is a large buprestid beetle, averaging 16.8-19.5mm in length for adults. Adult males are somewhat smaller than adult females, with both showing a brassy-gray coloration.

== Distribution and habitat ==
Gyascutus allenrolfeae is found only in alkali flats and desert lowlands within the western Sonoran Desert, with the species most frequently seen near the shores of the Salton Sea. Records also exist from near Yuma, Arizona and as far south as Bahia Santa Maria south of San Felipe in Baja California. It is always found associated with its host plant, iodine bush.

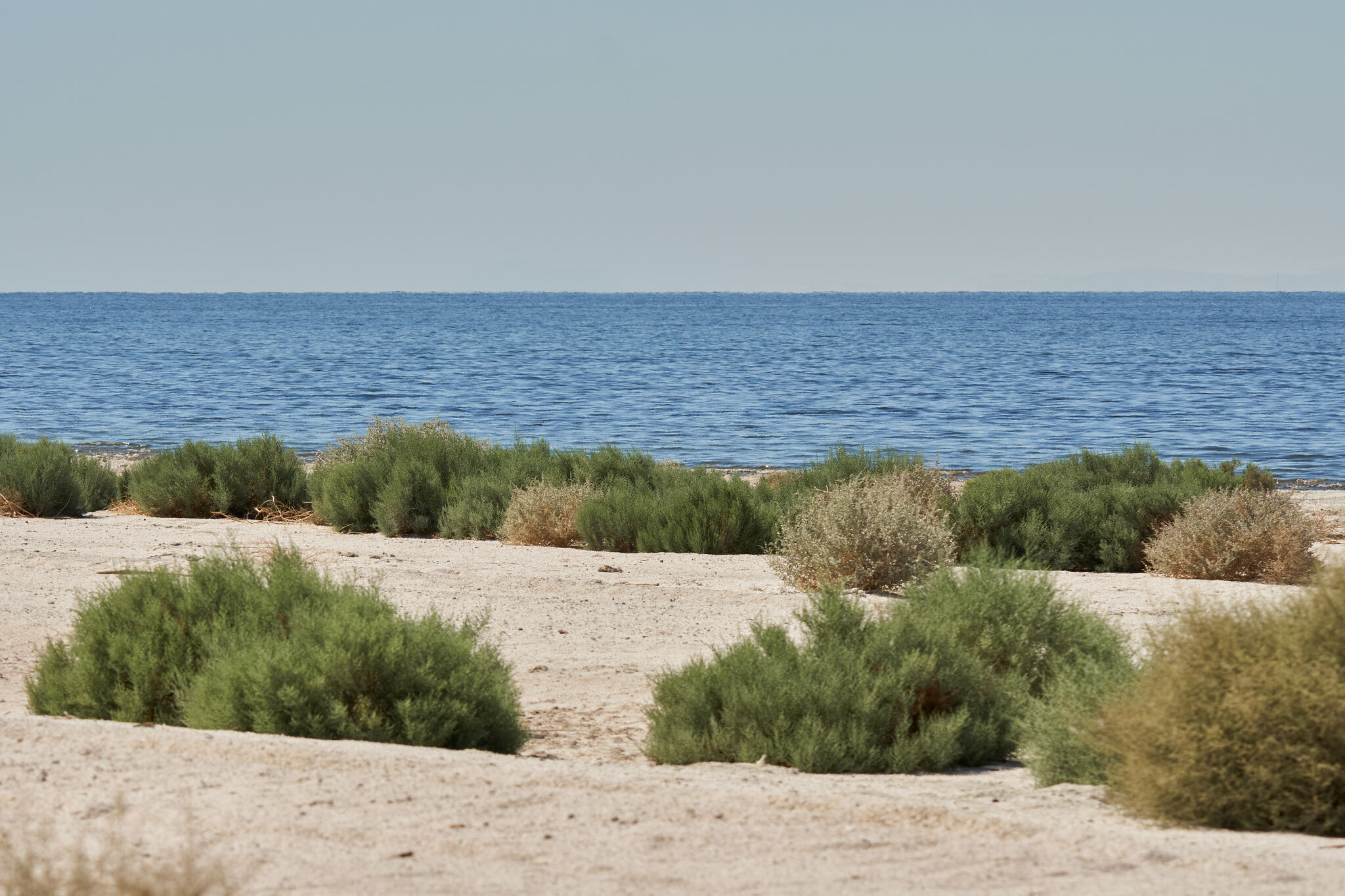
Habitat near Niland, California on the shore of the Salton Sea, with abundant iodine bush

== Ecology ==
Larvae feed in the roots of iodine bush. Adults emerge in summer and can be found between late June and August.

== Etymology ==
The specific name allenrolfeae refers to the species' sole host plant Allenrolfea occidentalis, or iodine bush.
