= Coleophora halocnemi =

Scientific classification
- Kingdom: Animalia
- Phylum: Arthropoda
- Class: Insecta
- Order: Lepidoptera
- Family: Coleophoridae
- Genus: Coleophora
- Species: C. halocnemi

Binomial name
- Coleophora halocnemi (Falkovitsh, 1994)

Synonyms
- Aureliania halocnemi Falkovitsh, 1994; Ecebalia halocnemi

Species of moth

Coleophora halocnemi is a moth of the family Coleophoridae. It is found in the lower Volga area of southern Russia and central Asia. It occurs in desert-steppe and desert biotopes.

Adults are on wing from late May to June.

The larvae feed on Halocnemum strobilaceum. They feed on the carpels of their host plant.
