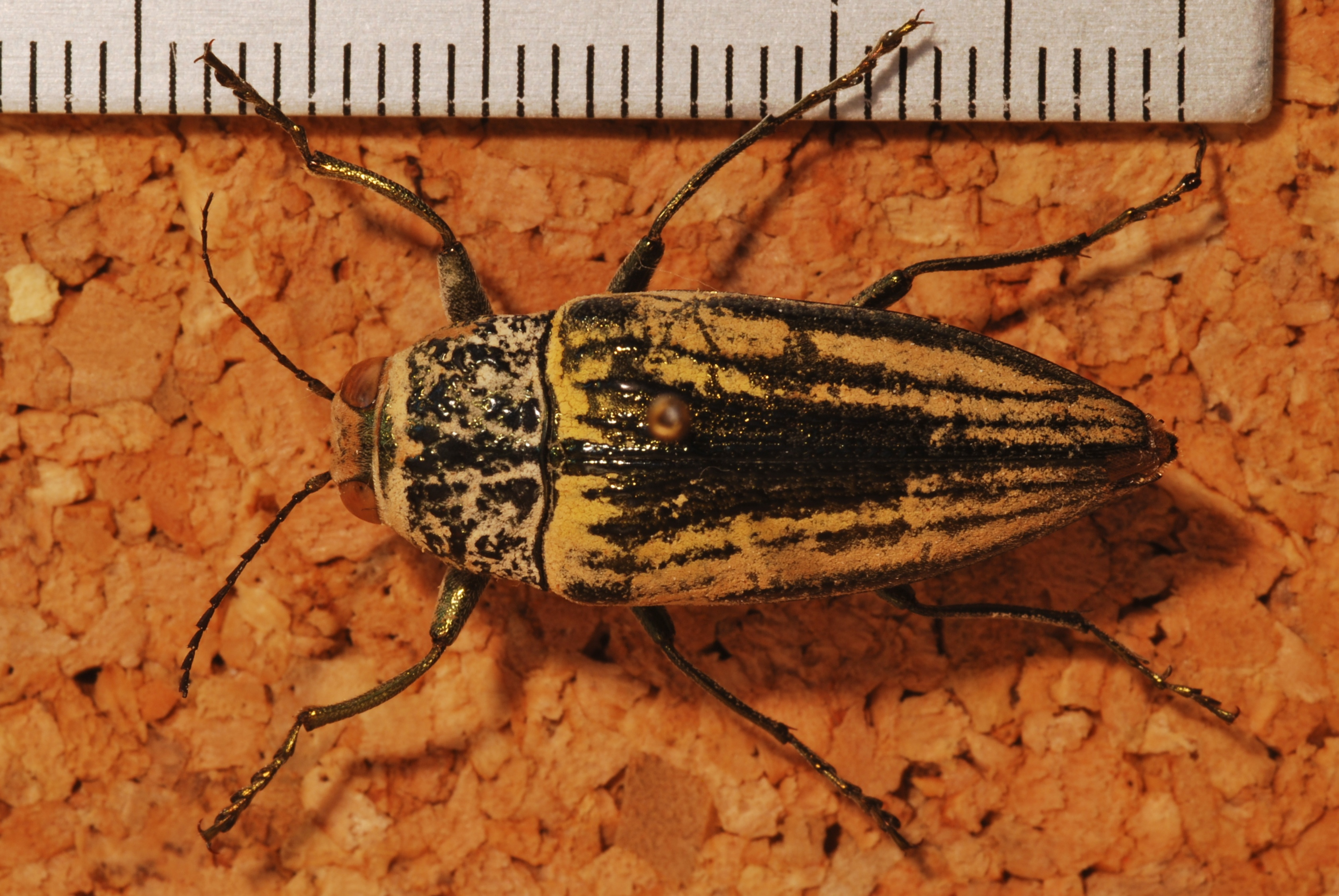

Scientific classification
- Domain: Eukaryota
- Kingdom: Animalia
- Phylum: Arthropoda
- Class: Insecta
- Order: Coleoptera
- Suborder: Polyphaga
- Infraorder: Elateriformia
- Family: Buprestidae
- Genus: Gyascutus
- Species: G. planicosta

Binomial name
- Gyascutus planicosta (LeConte, 1858)

= Gyascutus planicosta =

Species of beetle

Gyascutus planicosta is a species of metallic wood-boring beetle in the family Buprestidae. It is found in Central America and North America.

== Subspecies ==
These three subspecies belong to the species Gyascutus planicosta:

- Gyascutus planicosta cribriceps Casey, 1909
- Gyascutus planicosta obliteratus (LeConte, 1858)
- Gyascutus planicosta planicosta (LeConte, 1858)
