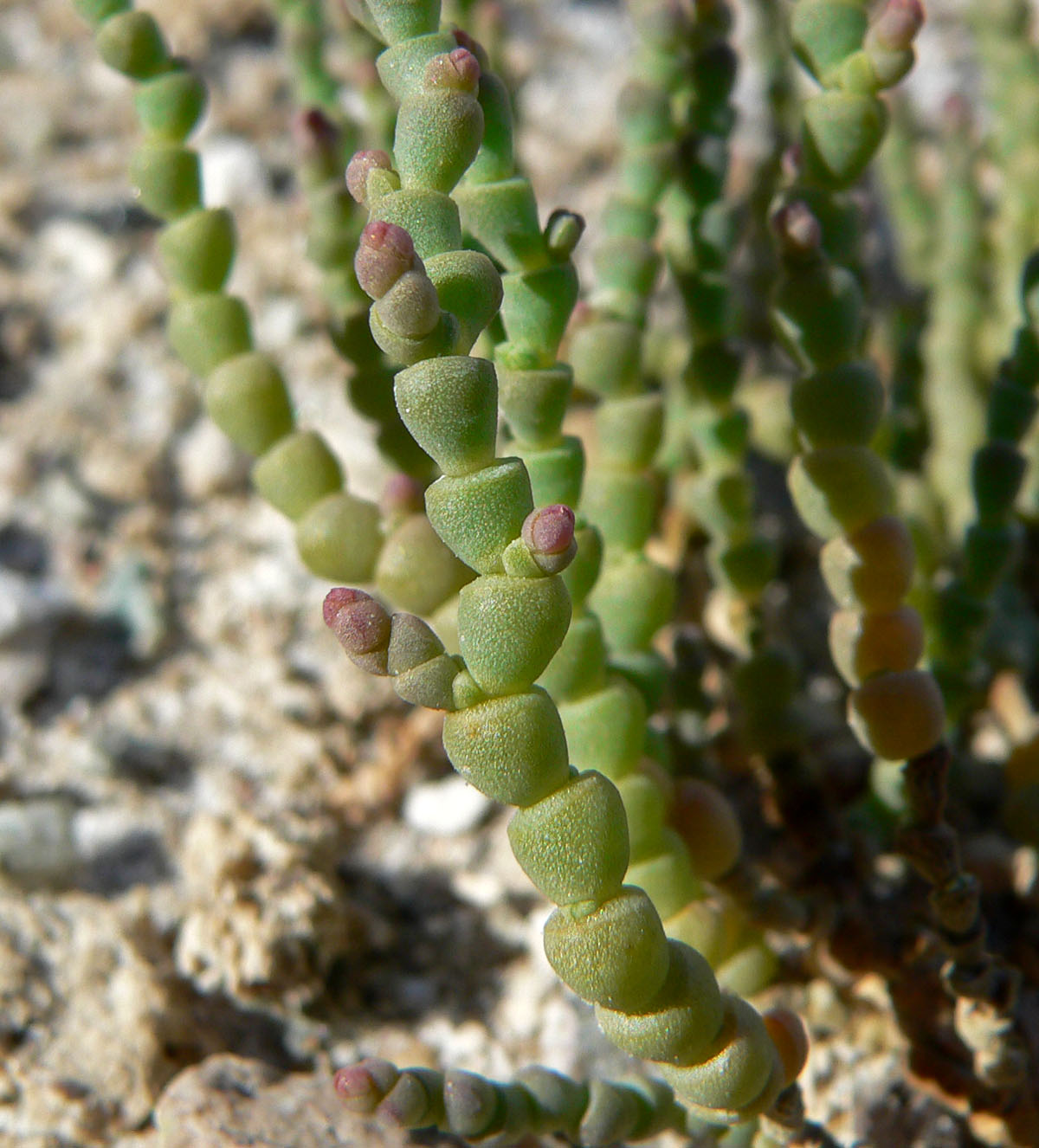
- Allenrolfea occidentalis

Scientific classification
- Kingdom: Plantae
- Clade: Tracheophytes
- Clade: Angiosperms
- Clade: Eudicots
- Order: Caryophyllales
- Family: Amaranthaceae
- Subfamily: Salicornioideae
- Genus: Allenrolfea; Kuntze

Species
- Allenrolfea occidentalis (S.Watson) Kuntze; Allenrolfea patagonica (Moq.) Kuntze; Allenrolfea vaginata (Griseb.) Kuntze

= Allenrolfea =

Genus of flowering plants

Allenrolfea is a genus of shrubs in the family Amaranthaceae. The genus was named for the English botanist Robert Allen Rolfe. There are three species, ranging from North America to South America.

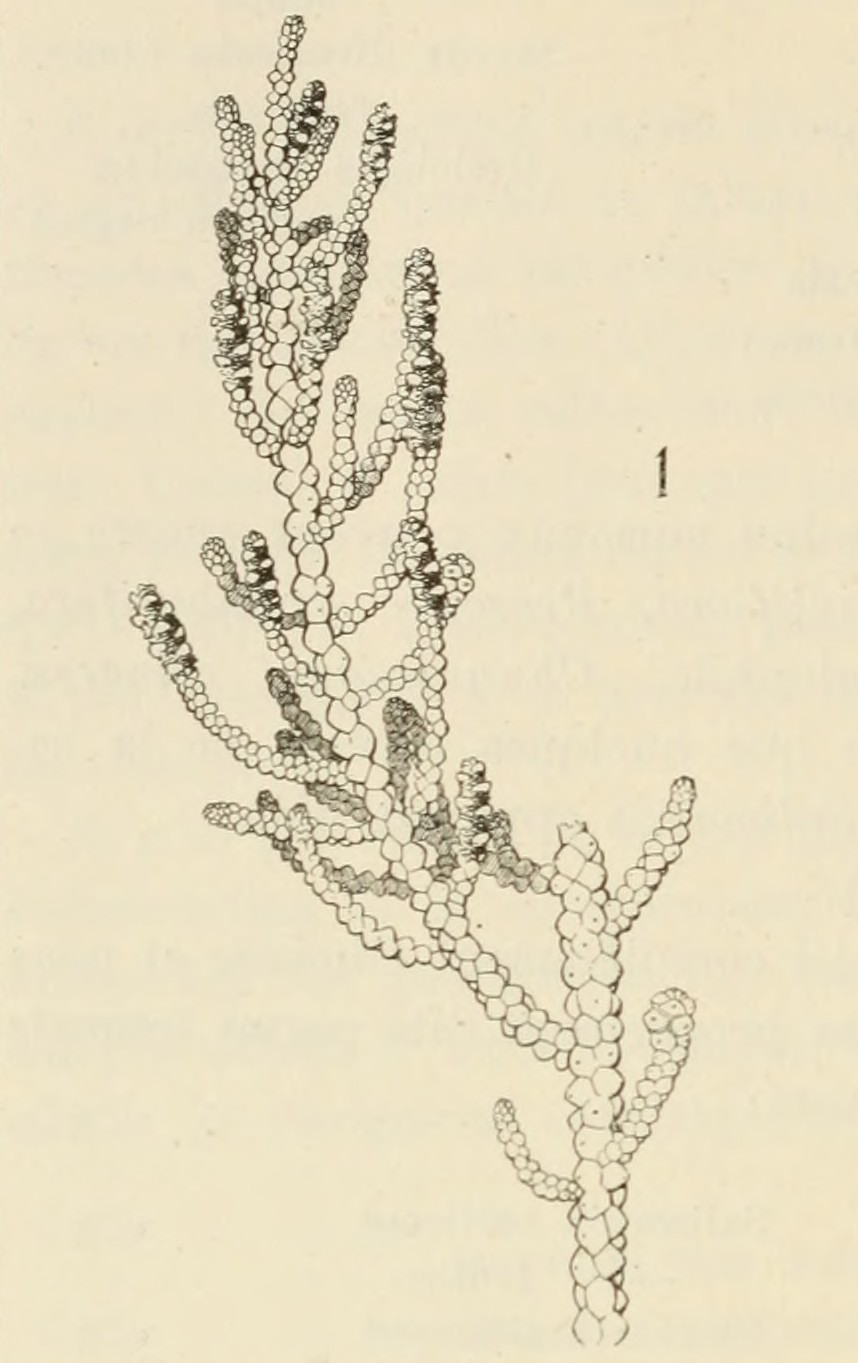
Allenrolfea patagonica

== Description ==
The species of Allenrolfea are subshrubs or shrubs with erect or decumbent growth. The stems are much branched, succulent, glabrous and appear to be articulated. The alternate leaves are sessile and stem-clasping, fleshy, glabrous, their blades reduced to small, broadly triangular scales, with entire margins and acute apex.

The inflorescences are terminal spikes with spirally arranged flowers. Cymes of three or five flowers are sitting in the axils of deciduous, peltate, fleshy bracts. The flowers are bisexual. The perianth consists of 4-5 joined tepals, their lobes angled and truncate distally. There are 1-2 stamens exserting the flower and an ovary with 2(-3) stigmas.

The fruit in an ovoid, compressed utricle with membranous pericarp. The erect seed is brown or reddish brown, oblong, with smooth surface. It contains copious perisperm (feeding tissue), and a half-annular embryo.

The chromosome basic number is x = 9.

== Occurrence ==
The species of Allenrolfea are distributed in North America (southwestern United States), Mexico, Central America, and South America (Argentina). They grow on alkaline soils, on sandy hummocks in salt playas, and in mud flats. In the USA they are found at about 1000–1700 m above sea level.

== Systematics ==
The first publication of the genus Allenrolfea was made in 1891 by Otto Kuntze. With this description, he replaced the invalid name Spirostachys S.Watson from 1874, (which is illegitimate, as Spirostachys Sond. already existed since 1850). The type species is Allenrolfea occidentalis.

The genus consists of three species:

- Allenrolfea occidentalis (S.Watson) Kuntze, in North America (southwestern USA: Arizona, California, Idaho, New Mexico, Nevada, Oregon, Texas, Utah), and in Mexico.
- Allenrolfea patagonica (Moq.) Kuntze, endemic in Argentina.
- Allenrolfea vaginata (Griseb.) Kuntze, endemic to Argentina.

Allenrolfea is a near relative of the genus Heterostachys, which also is distributed in America. Their common lineage seems to have evolved early in the evolution of the subfamily Salicornioideae, dating back to the Early to Middle Oligocene. It might have reached America long before the other American taxa of Salicornioideae.
