= Gyascutus pacificus =

Scientific classification
- Domain: Eukaryota
- Kingdom: Animalia
- Phylum: Arthropoda
- Class: Insecta
- Order: Coleoptera
- Suborder: Polyphaga
- Infraorder: Elateriformia
- Family: Buprestidae
- Genus: Gyascutus
- Species: G. pacificus

Binomial name
- Gyascutus pacificus (Chamberlin, 1938)

Species of beetle

Gyascutus pacificus is a species of metallic wood-boring beetle in the family Buprestidae. It is found in North America.
