= Mangleticornia =

Scientific classification
- Kingdom: Plantae
- Clade: Tracheophytes
- Clade: Angiosperms
- Clade: Eudicots
- Order: Caryophyllales
- Family: Amaranthaceae
- Subfamily: Salicornioideae
- Genus: Mangleticornia; P.W.Ball, G.Kadereit & Cornejo (2017)
- Species: M. ecuadorensis

Binomial name
- Mangleticornia ecuadorensis P.W.Ball, G.Kadereit & Cornejo (2017)

Genus of plants

Mangleticornia is a monotypic genus of flowering plants belonging to the family Amaranthaceae. The only species is Mangleticornia ecuadorensis.

It is a shrub native to southwestern Ecuador and northern Peru (Tumbes Region).
