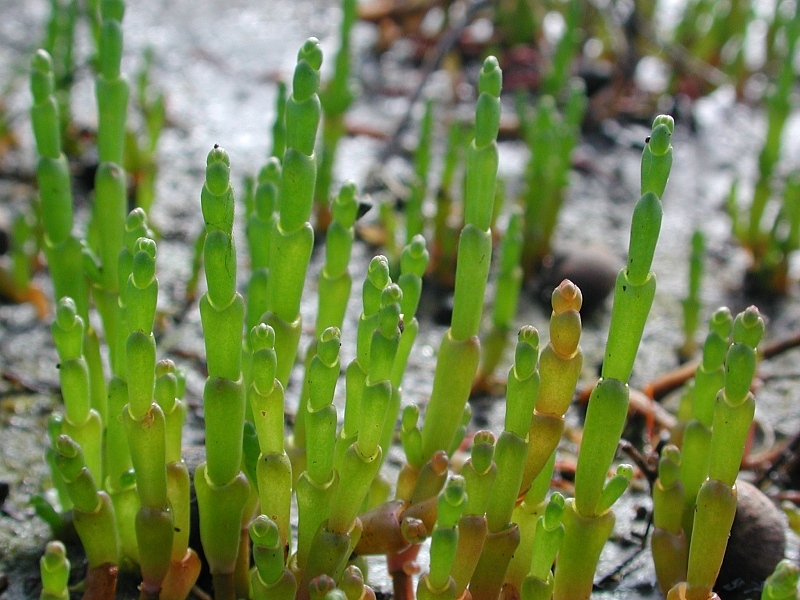
- Salicornia europaea

Scientific classification
- Kingdom: Plantae
- Clade: Tracheophytes
- Clade: Angiosperms
- Clade: Eudicots
- Order: Caryophyllales
- Family: Amaranthaceae
- Subfamily: Salicornioideae; Ulbr.

Genera
- About 11 genera, see text

= Salicornioideae =

Subfamily of flowering plants

The Salicornioideae are a subfamily of the flowering plant family Amaranthaceae (sensu lato, including the Chenopodiaceae). Important characters are succulent, often articulated stems, strongly reduced leaves, and flowers aggregated in thick, dense spike-shaped thyrses. These halophytic plants are distributed worldwide. Many are edible (see Samphire)

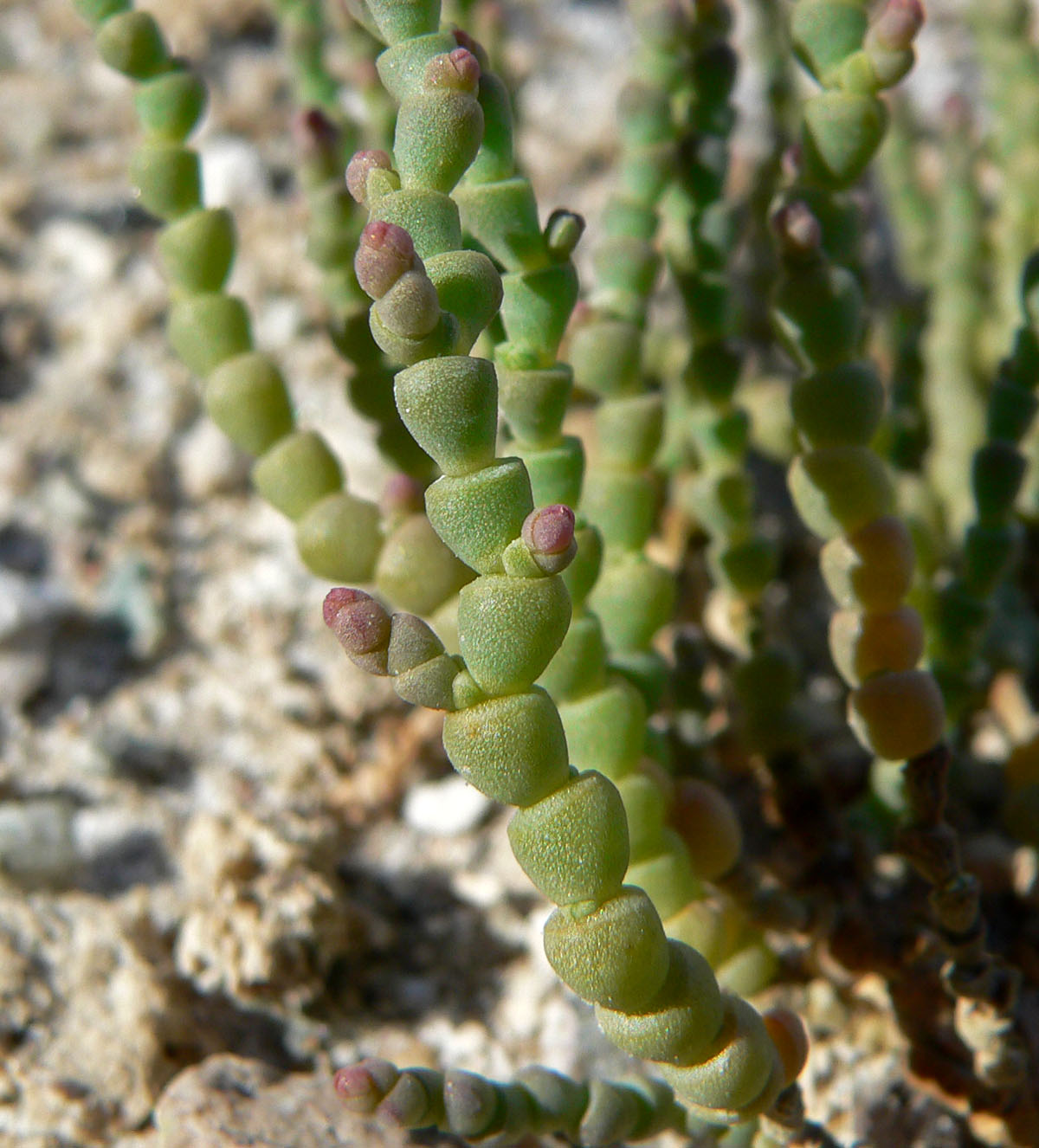
Allenrolfea occidentalis

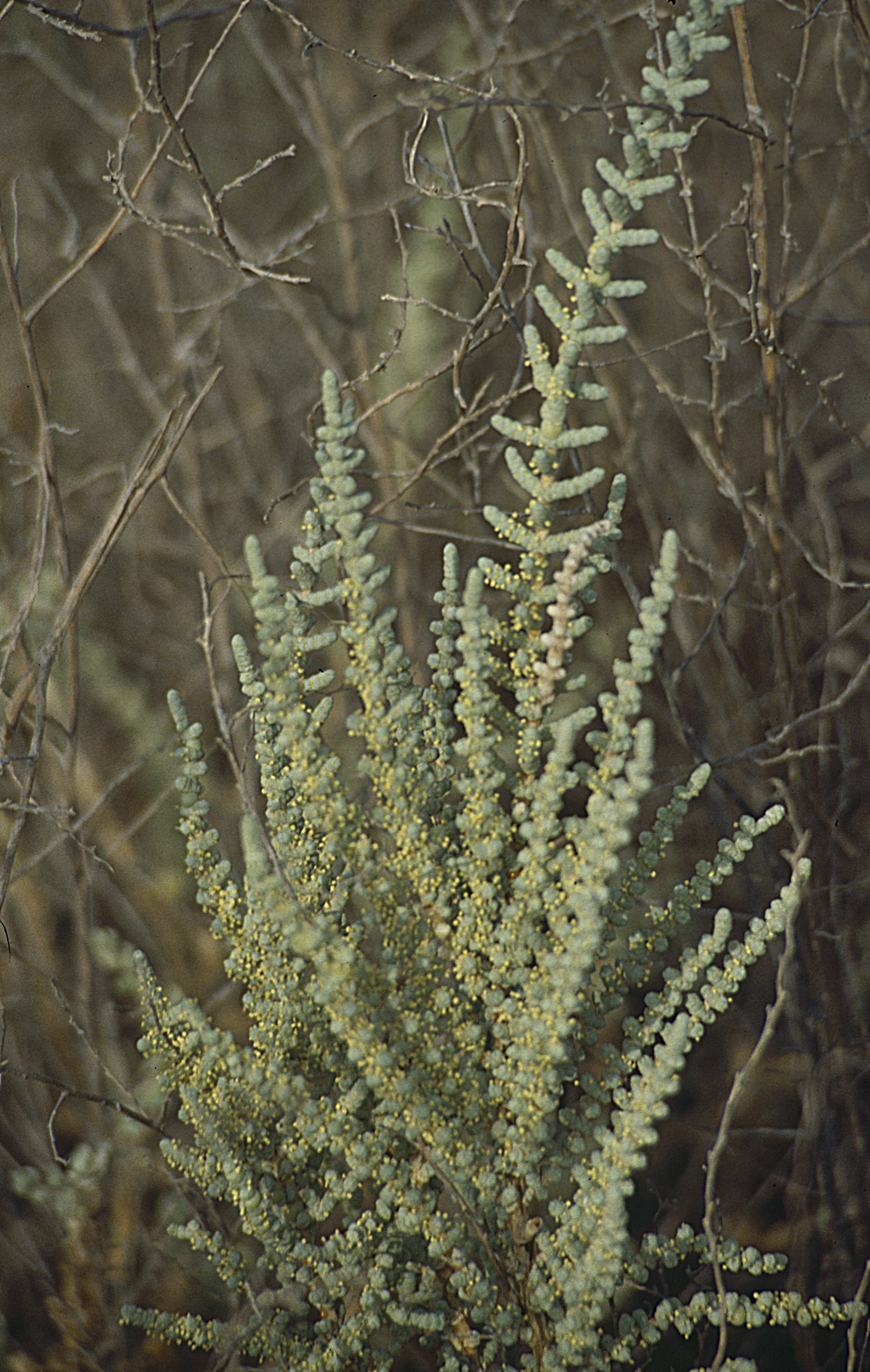
Halocnemum cruciatum

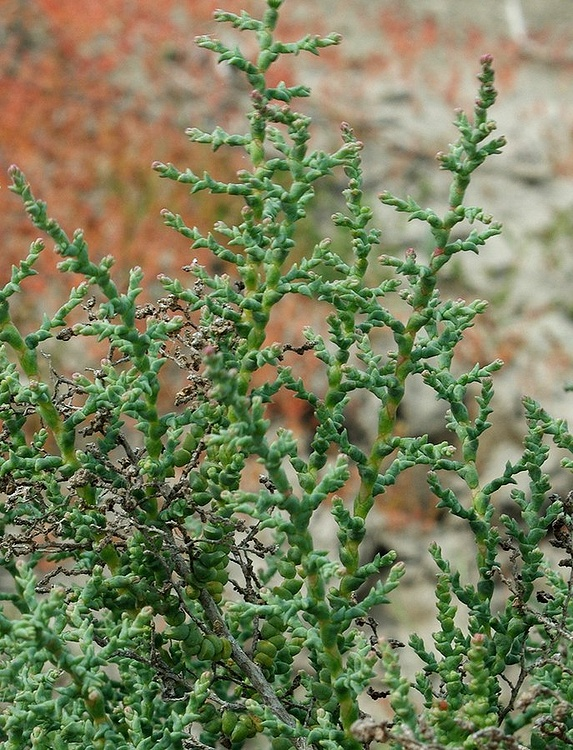
Kalidium caspicum

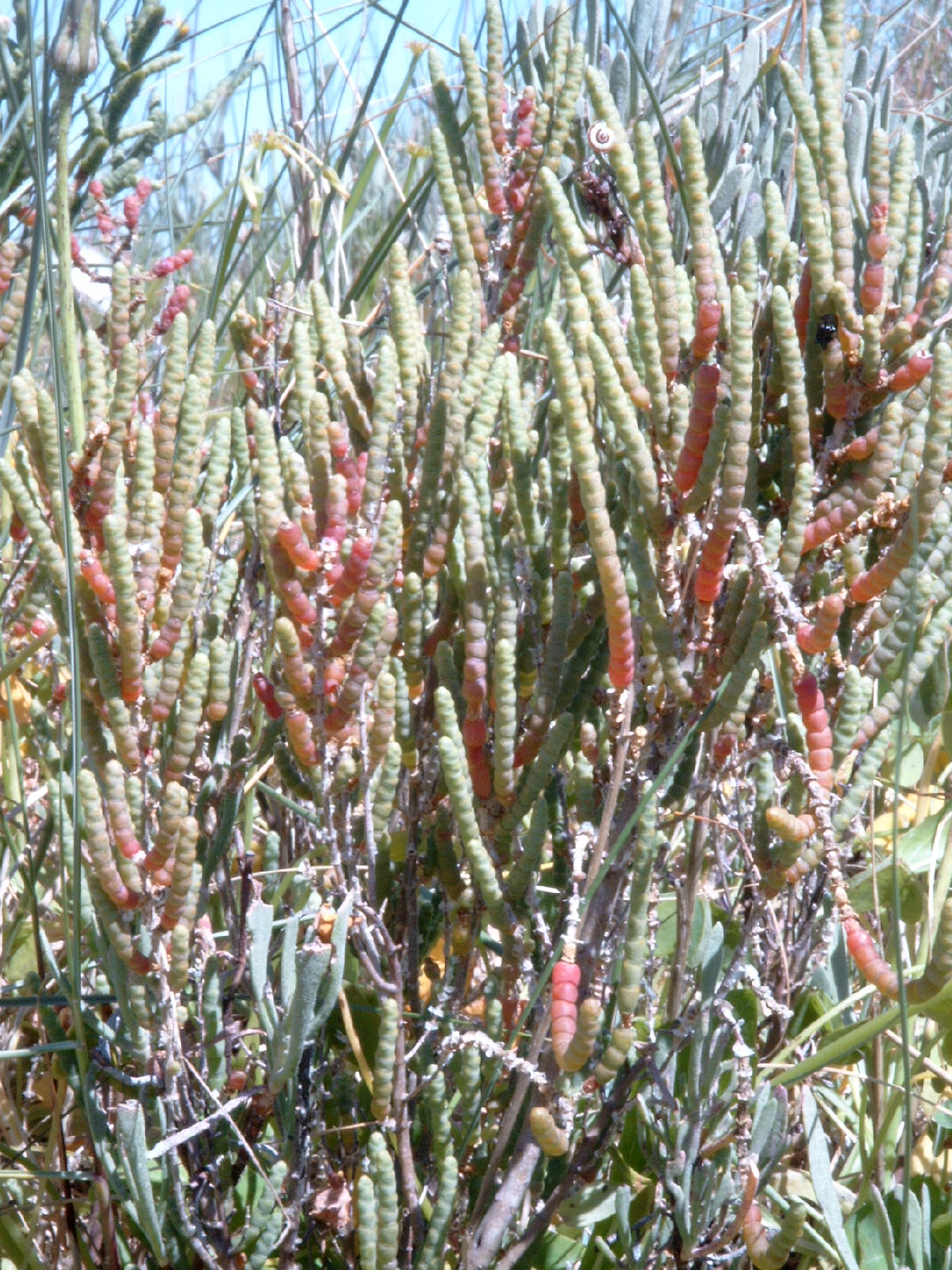
Salicornia perennis

== Description ==
The Salicornioideae are annual or perennial herbs, subshrubs, or low shrubs. Their stems are glabrous and often apparently jointed. The alternate or opposite leaves are fleshy, glabrous, often basally connate and stem-clasping (thus forming the joints), with missing or short free leaf blades.

The spike-shaped inflorescences consist of alternate or opposite bracts, these are often connate and stem-clasping, sometimes free. In the axil of each bract, there are one to five (rarely to twelve) flowers, free or sometimes fused to each other, to the bract, and to the inflorescence axis. The flowers are usually bisexual (the lateral flowers may be unisexual). The 2-5-lobed perianth consists of two to five connate tepals. There are one or two stamens and an ovary with mostly two stigmas.

In fruiting phase, the perianth remains membranous or becomes spongy, crustaceous, or horny. The fruit wall (pericarp) may be membranous, fleshy, chartaceous, crustaceous, woody, or horny. The seed is disc-shaped, lenticular, ovoid or wedge-shaped. Its surface may be smooth, papillose, reticulate, tuberculate or longitudinally ribbed. The embryo is curved, half-annular or horseshoe-shaped, rarely only slightly curved. In most genera, the seed contains copious perisperm, but a feeding tissue is missing in Salicornia.

== Photosynthesis pathway ==
The majority of the Salicornieae species are C_{3}-plants. There is only one species that has developed C_{4}-photosynthesis, Tecticornia indica (syn. Halosarcia indica).

== Distribution and evolution ==
Plants from the Salicornioideae are found around the world. All are halophytes, growing in coastal or inland saline habitats.

The Salicornioideae originated in Eurasia about 38-28 million years ago, during the Late Eocene/Early Oligocene, and radiated rapidly into its major lineages. Kalidium, the Halocnemum/Halostachys-lineage, Halopeplis, and the Allenrolfea/Heterostachys-lineage were branching off early. Later developed the Arthrocnemum/Microcnemum-lineage, the Halosarcia-lineage (with Halosarcia, Pachycornia, Tecticornia, Sclerostegia, Tegicornia), and the Salicornia/Sarcocornia-lineage. Already in the Middle Miocene, about 19-14 million years ago, all major lineages were present.

== Systematics ==
The taxon was first published in 1849 by Alfred Moquin-Tandon as a tribe Salicornieae within the family Chenopodiaceae. In 1934, Oskar Eberhard Ulbrich raised the taxon to subfamily level and named it Salicornioideae (in: A. Engler & K. Prantl (eds.): Die natürlichen Pflanzenfamilien, ed. 2, Vol. 16c).

The family Chenopodiaceae is now included in Amaranthaceae s.l.

Phylogenetic research supports the monophyly of the subfamily. According to Kadereit et al. (2006) and Piirainen et al. (2017), it comprises just one tribe, the Salicornieae. Traditionally two tribes had been distinguished, Halopeplideae and Salicornieae, but these are not monophyletic.

- Tribus Salicornieae: with 12 genera and over 100 species:
  - Allenrolfea Kuntze, with 3 species in North and South America.
  - Arthrocaulon Piirainen & G.Kadereit (formerly part of Arthrocnemum)
  - Arthroceras Piirainen & G.Kadereit (formerly part of Arthrocnemum)
  - Halocnemum M.Bieb., with 2 species, from Southern Europe and North Africa to Asia.
  - Halopeplis Bunge ex Ung.-Sternb., with 3 species, from the Mediterranean basin and North Africa to Southwest Asia and Central Asia.
  - Halostachys C.A.Mey. ex Schrenk, with only one species:
    - Halostachys belangeriana in Central and Southwest Asia and southeastern Europe
  - Heterostachys Ung.-Sternb.: with 2 species in Central and South America
  - Kalidium Moq. (Syn.: Kalidiopsis Aellen): with 6 species in Central and Southwest Asia and Southeast Europe
  - Mangleticornia P. W. Ball, G. Kadereit and X. Cornejo, with one species:
    - Mangleticornia ecuadorensis in Equatorial-Pacific mangroves of South America.
  - Microcnemum Ung.-Sternb., with only one species:
    - Microcnemum coralloides in Spain, Turkey, Armenia, and northwestern Iran
  - Salicornia L., with over 50 species worldwide when Sarcocornia is included, especially in the Northern Hemisphere
  - Tecticornia Hook f. (inclusive Halosarcia Paul G.Wilson, Pachycornia Hook. f., Sclerostegia Paul G.Wilson, Tegicornia Paul G.Wilson), with about 44 species, in Australia, and along tropical coasts of the Indian Ocean to eastern and western tropical Africa.

Sarcocornia A.J.Scott, with about 30 species worldwide, is now sunk into Salicornia.
