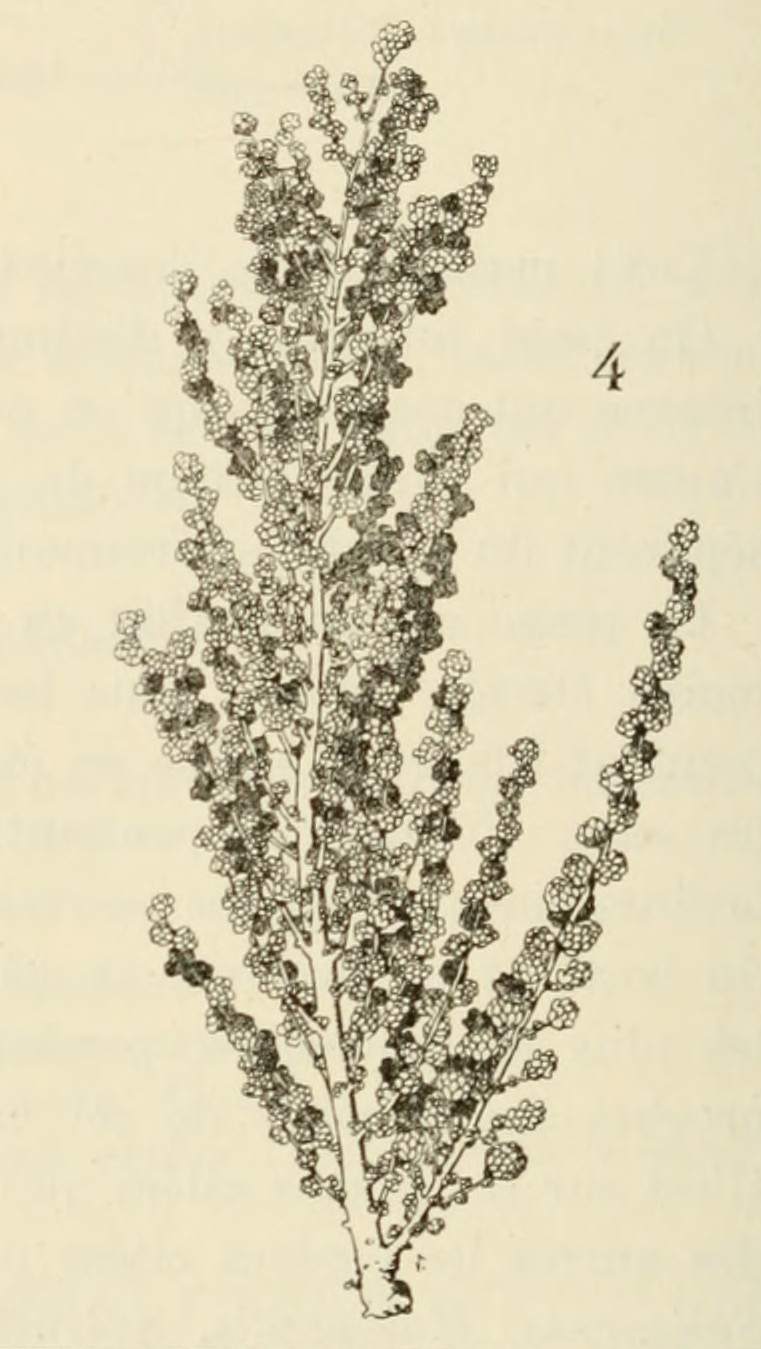
- Heterostachys olivascens

Scientific classification
- Kingdom: Plantae
- Clade: Tracheophytes
- Clade: Angiosperms
- Clade: Eudicots
- Order: Caryophyllales
- Family: Amaranthaceae
- Subfamily: Salicornioideae
- Genus: Heterostachys; Ung.-Sternb.

Species
- Heterostachys olivascens (Speg.) Molfino; Heterostachys ritteriana (Moq.) Ung.-Sternb.

= Heterostachys =

Genus of flowering plants

Heterostachys is a genus of flowering plants in the plant family Amaranthaceae. The two species are shrubby halophytes native to South America and Central America.

== Description ==
The species of Heterostachys grow as subshrubs or low shrubs. The stems are much branched, glabrous, and not jointed. The alternate leaves are fleshy, glabrous, scale-like, stem-clasping, with very short free blades (1–2 mm).

The inflorescences are orbicular to cone-like, with alternate to nearly opposite scale-like bracts, and with one free flower sitting in the axil of each bract. The flowers are bisexual. The four-lobed perianth consists of four half-connate unequal tepals. There are two stamens and an ovary with two stigmas.

In fruit, the perianth becomes thick and spongy. The fruit wall (pericarp) is membranous. The seed is lenticular to edge-shaped with tuberculate surface. It contains a semi-annular embryo and copious perisperm (feeding tissue).

== Distribution and habitat ==
Heterostachys is distributed in South America and Central America (Hispaniola). The plants are halophytes and grow in coastal lagoons and salty inland habitats.

== Systematics ==
The genus Heterostachys was first published in 1876 by Franz Ungern-Sternberg. With this description, he replaced the invalid name Spirostachys Ung.-Sternb. from 1866, (which is illegitimate, as Spirostachys Sond. already existed since 1850). The type species is Heterostachys ritteriana.

The genus comprises two species:

- Heterostachys olivascens (Speg.) Molfino - endemic to Argentina (Buenos Aires, Mendoza, Río Negro), at 0–500 m above sea level.
- Heterostachys ritteriana (Moq.) Ung.-Sternb. - widely distributed in South America and Central America: Argentina, Paraguay, Venezuela, Peru, Haiti, Dominican Republic.

Heterostachys is closely related to the genus Allenrolfea, which also is distributed in America. Their common lineage seems to have evolved early in the evolution of the subfamily Salicornioideae, dating back to the Early to Middle Oligocene. It might have reached America long before the other American taxa of Salicornioideae.
