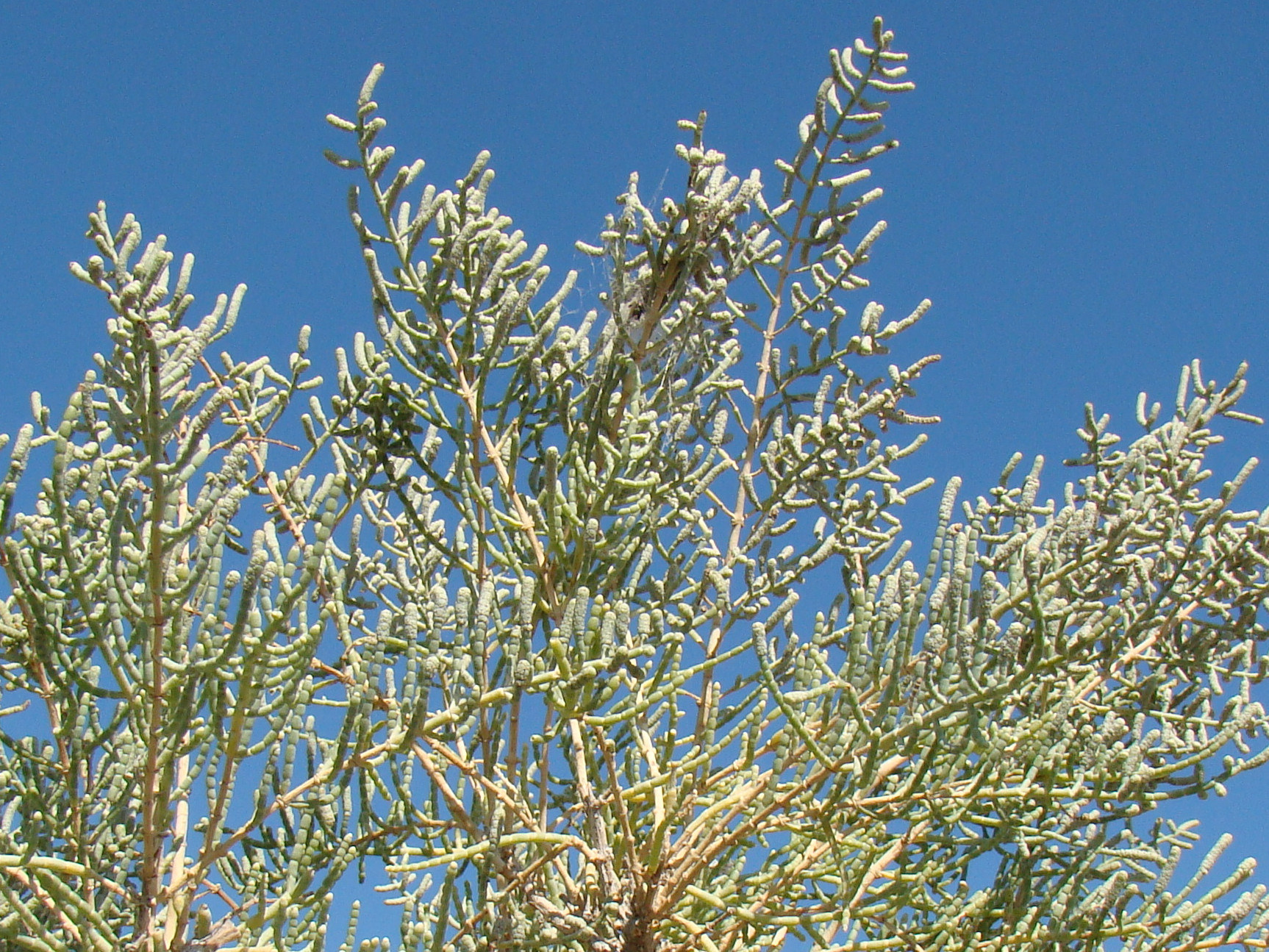

Conservation status
- Least Concern (IUCN 3.1)

Scientific classification
- Kingdom: Plantae
- Clade: Embryophytes
- Clade: Tracheophytes
- Clade: Angiosperms
- Clade: Eudicots
- Order: Caryophyllales
- Family: Amaranthaceae
- Subfamily: Salicornioideae
- Genus: Halostachys; C.A.Mey. ex Schrenk
- Species: H. caspica

Binomial name
- Halostachys caspica (M.Bieb.) C.A.Mey.

Synonyms
- Arthrocnemum belangerianum Moq.; Arthrocnemum caspicum (M.Bieb.) Moq.; Halocnemum caspicum M.Bieb.; Halostachys belangeriana (Moq.) Botsch.; Halostachys songarica Schrenk; Salicornia caspica Pall.

= Halostachys =

Genus of flowering plants

Halostachys is a genus of flowering plants in the plant family Amaranthaceae, containing a single species, Halostachys caspica. The plants are small to medium halophytic shrubs with apparently jointed fleshy stems and scale-like leaves. They are native to western and central Asia and northern China.

== Description ==
Halostachys caspica grows as a shrub to 1–3 m height and width. The erect stems are much branched, older twigs are mostly leafless. The young twigs are blue-green, fleshy, apparently jointed (articulated), with glabrous fine papillose surface. The opposite leaves are fleshy, glabrous, connate basally and surrounding the stem (thus forming the joints), with very short scale-like triangular blades.

The inflorescences consist of numerous opposite lateral cylindrical spikes, 15-30 × 2–5 mm, on jointed peduncles. Groups of three bisexual flowers are sitting in the axils of rhombic-quadrate bracts. The opposite bracts are not connate to each other. The obovoid to obpyramidal perianth consists of three connate tepals, the apex with three incurved lobes. There is one stamen exserting the flower. The ovoid ovary bears two subulate papillate stigmas. The flowering and fruiting phase reaches from July to November.

The fruit is enclosed by the fleshy, somewhat inflated, three-angled, shiny perianth. The fruit wall (pericarp) is membranous. The erect seed is oblong and red-brown, containing the half-annular embryo and copious perisperm (feeding tissue).

== Systematics ==
The genus Halostachys was first published in 1843 by Alexander von Schrenk. At that time, the genus comprised three species (Halostachys caspica, Halostachys nodulosa, and Halostachys songarica). The name had been introduced by Carl Anton von Meyer in 1838 (as "Halostachys caspia"), but without giving a genus description. In 1874, Halostachys songarica was chosen as the lectotype of the genus. But this was problematic, as in 1866 Halostachys songarica and H. nodulosa had been transferred to the genus Halopeplis by Franz Ungern-Sternberg. Mikko Piirainen (2015) proposed to conserve the name Halostachys with the conserved type Halostachys caspica, (of which Halostachys belangeriana is a synonym).

Today Halostachys includes just one species, Halostachys caspica (Moq.) Botsch.. The earliest description of this species was made in 1771 by Peter Simon Pallas as Salicornia caspica Pall., but this name is illegitimate (as Salicornia caspica L. existed already since 1753). The synonyms Halocnemum caspicum (Pall.) M.Bieb., Halostachys caspia (Pall.) C.A.Mey. (nom. inval.), Halostachys caspica (Pall.) C.A.Mey. ex Schrenk, and Arthrocnemum caspicum (Pall.) Moq. (p.p., nom. confus.) are all based on this illegitimate name. Halostachys caspica is now a conserved name.

Phylogenetic research confirmed that Halostachys is closely related to the genus Halocnemum.

== Distribution and habitat ==
The distribution area of Halostachys caspica reaches from Southeast Europe, Caucasus (Russia, Armenia, eastern Turkey), Southwest Asia (northern Iran, Afghanistan, Pakistan), Central Asia (Turkmenistan, Mongolia) to Xinjiang and western Gansu (China).

The plants are halophytes and grow in salt marshes, salty and alkaline mudflats, salty ditches, in dry river beds, and along the shores of salt lakes.

== Uses ==
Halostachys caspica grows under extreme ecological conditions, and is a good fodder plant for the sustainable development on salty soils. The best fodder quality is achieved during the flowering phase. Economically important phytochemicals are flavonoids with antimicrobial and antioxidant properties.
