= Gyascutus caelatus =

Scientific classification
- Kingdom: Animalia
- Phylum: Arthropoda
- Clade: Pancrustacea
- Class: Insecta
- Order: Coleoptera
- Suborder: Polyphaga
- Infraorder: Elateriformia
- Family: Buprestidae
- Genus: Gyascutus
- Species: G. caelatus

Binomial name
- Gyascutus caelatus (LeConte, 1858)

Synonyms
- Gyascutus laticornis (Casey, 1909); Gyascutus pollens (Casey, 1909)

Species of beetle

Gyascutus caelatus is a species of metallic wood-boring beetle in the family Buprestidae. It is found in Central America and North America.
