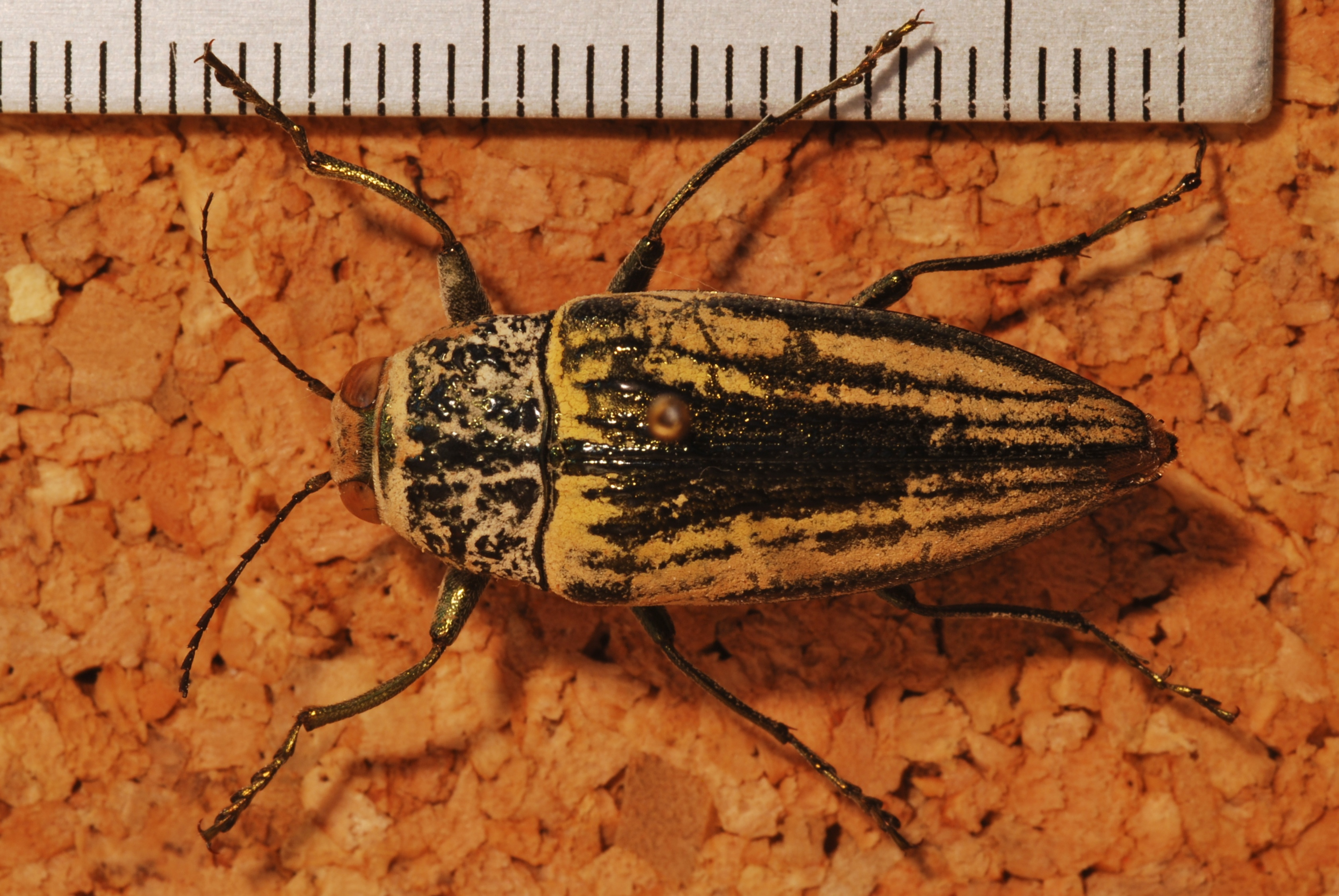
- Jewel Beetle (Gyascutus planicosta)

Scientific classification
- Kingdom: Animalia
- Phylum: Arthropoda
- Clade: Pancrustacea
- Class: Insecta
- Order: Coleoptera
- Suborder: Polyphaga
- Infraorder: Elateriformia
- Family: Buprestidae
- Subtribe: Hippomelanina
- Genus: Gyascutus; LeConte, 1858

= Gyascutus =

Genus of beetles

Gyascutus is a genus of beetles in the family Buprestidae, containing the following species:

- Gyascutus allenrolfeae (Verity, 1978)
- Gyascutus caelatus (LeConte, 1858)
- Gyascutus carolinensis Horn, 1883
- Gyascutus castaneus (Helfer, 1953)
- Gyascutus dianae (Helfer, 1954)
- Gyascutus fulgidus (Barr, 1969)
- Gyascutus granulatus (Van Dyke, 1942)
- Gyascutus insularis (Helfer, 1953)
- Gyascutus jeanae (Nelson, 1988)
- Gyascutus pacificus (Chamberlin, 1938)
- Gyascutus paragranulatus Nelson, 2000
- Gyascutus planicosta (LeConte, 1858)
- Gyascutus westcotti Nelson, 2000
