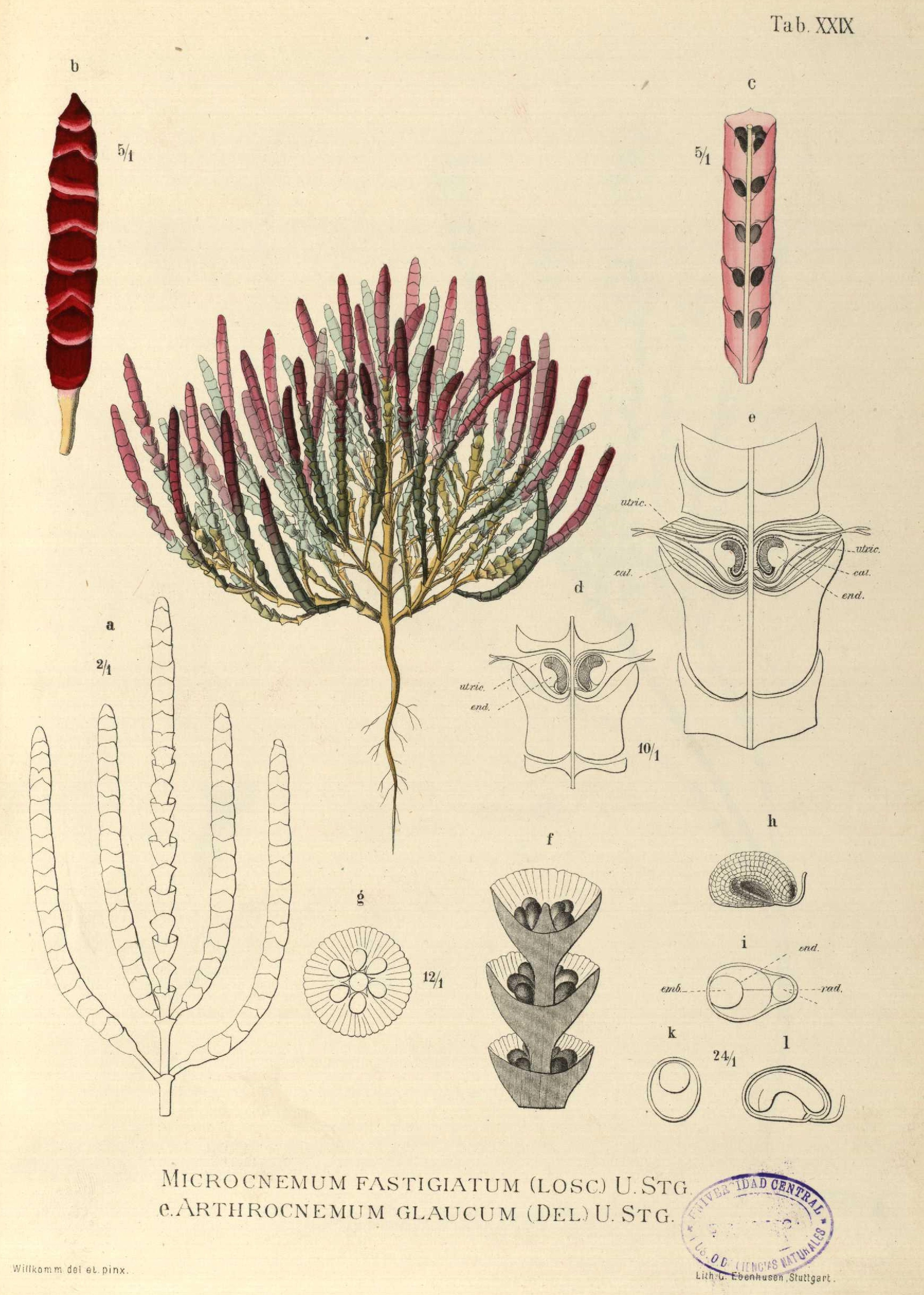
- Microcnemum coralloides

Conservation status
- Vulnerable (IUCN 3.1)

Scientific classification
- Kingdom: Plantae
- Clade: Tracheophytes
- Clade: Angiosperms
- Clade: Eudicots
- Order: Caryophyllales
- Family: Amaranthaceae
- Subfamily: Salicornioideae
- Genus: Microcnemum; Ung.-Sternb. (1876)
- Species: M. coralloides

Binomial name
- Microcnemum coralloides (Loscos & J.Pardo) Buen (1883)

Subspecies
- Microcnemum coralloides subsp. anatolicum Wagenitz; Microcnemum coralloides subsp. coralloides

Synonyms
- Arthrocnemum coralloides Loscos & J.Pardo (1863)

= Microcnemum =

Genus of flowering plants

Microcnemum is a genus in the plant family Amaranthaceae, containing a single species, Microcnemum coralloides. It is a dwarf annual halophyte with fleshy, apparently jointed stems and reduced leaves and flowers. The two subspecies show a disjunct distribution in Spain and Western Asia.

== Description ==
Microcnemum coralloides grows as a low annual herb of 5 to 10 cm (2.0 to 3.9 in) height. The color is variable, the subspecies Microcnemum coralloides subsp. coralloides is often purplish. The erect stems are branched. The opposite leaves are fleshy small scales, connate in the lower part and cup-like stem-clasping.

All branches are terminating in cone-like inflorescences, 1.5 to 3 cm (0.59 to 1.18 in) long. Cymes consist of (two or) three minute flowers that are sunk in the axil of each opposite bract. The bisexual flowers are free. The connate tepals are reduced to a minute membranous lobe or sometimes absent, especially in fruit. There is only one stamen and an ovary with two stigmas.

The vertical seed is ovoid, somewhat flattened, reddish-magenta, with tubercular or papillose surface. The seed contains the terete curved embryo and copious perisperm (feeding tissue).

== Distribution and habitat ==
Microcnemum coralloides is distributed in the Mediterranean region and Western Asia. The two subspecies show remarkable disjunct areals: Microcnemum coralloides subsp. coralloides occurs in central and eastern Spain, Microcnemum coralloides subsp. anatolicum occurs in Turkey, Syria, Armenia, and Iran.

The plants are halophytes and grow at the shores of very saline flat lagoons and inland saltpans, often on thick salt crusts, together with few other halophytes, tolerating extreme salinity during the dry season. Microcnemum coralloides is a rare species.

== Systematics and phylogeny ==
The first valid species description was made in 1863 by Francisco Loscos Bernal and José Pardo Sastrón as Arthrocnemum coralloides Loscos & J.Pardo (in: Willkomm, H.M.: Series Inconfecta Plantarum Aragoniae, Dresde: p. 90). Before that, the authors had used the name Salicornia fastigiata in an unpublished manuscript, "Flora de Aragón". In 1876, Franz Ungern-Sternberg transferred the species to a new monotypic genus, Microcnemum. But his Microcnemum fastigiatum (Loscos & J.Pardo) Ung.-Sternb. was an illegitimate name, because it is based on an unpublished name. Odón de Buen corrected the combination to Microcnemum coralloides (Loscos & J.Pardo) Buen in 1883. A further synonym is Loscosia aragonensis Willk. ex Pau (nomen illegit).

The genus comprises just one species, Microcnemum coralloides. There are two subspecies differing mainly by their seed characters. Slight differences concerning height, succulence, branching, and coloration (the eastern subspecies is never purplish) are variable and seem to be influenced by seasonal fluctuations of rainfall and soil salinity.

- Microcnemum coralloides (Loscos & J.Pardo) Buen subsp. coralloides - with granulose or slightly papillose surface of the seed coat.
- Microcnemum coralloides subsp. anatolicum Wagenitz - with densely and distinctly papillose surface of the seed coat.

Microcnemum, together with the phylogenetic lineages of Sarcocornia/Salicornia and the Australian members (Tecticornia) of the subfamily Salicornioideae, probably evolved during the Mid Miocene at the shores of the Thetys Sea.

Phylogenetic research indicates that Microcnemum coralloides originated in the East Mediterranean region, the split of the subspecies ranging from 2.8 to 0.5 million years ago. Microcnemum coralloides subsp. coralloides seems to have evolved during cold periods of the Early Pleistocene, when lower sea level allowed westward migration along coastal saline lagoons. Probably soon after the arrival in Iberia, the distribution range was interrupted during a following warm period.
