= Gyascutus carolinensis =

Scientific classification
- Domain: Eukaryota
- Kingdom: Animalia
- Phylum: Arthropoda
- Class: Insecta
- Order: Coleoptera
- Suborder: Polyphaga
- Infraorder: Elateriformia
- Family: Buprestidae
- Genus: Gyascutus
- Species: G. carolinensis

Binomial name
- Gyascutus carolinensis Horn, 1883

Synonyms
- Gyascutus aeneoviridis Casey, 1909; Gyascutus compactus Casey, 1909; Gyascutus cylindrinus Casey, 1909; Gyascutus debilis Casey, 1909; Gyascutus juniperinus Wickham, 1905; Gyascutus obesus Casey, 1909; Gyascutus solidus Casey, 1909; Gyascutus tenuis Casey, 1909

Species of beetle

Gyascutus carolinensis is a species of metallic wood-boring beetle in the family Buprestidae. It is found in Central America and North America.
