= Gyascutus fulgidus =

Scientific classification
- Domain: Eukaryota
- Kingdom: Animalia
- Phylum: Arthropoda
- Class: Insecta
- Order: Coleoptera
- Suborder: Polyphaga
- Infraorder: Elateriformia
- Family: Buprestidae
- Genus: Gyascutus
- Species: G. fulgidus

Binomial name
- Gyascutus fulgidus (Barr, 1969)

Species of beetle

Gyascutus fulgidus is a species of metallic wood-boring beetle in the family Buprestidae. It is found in North America.
