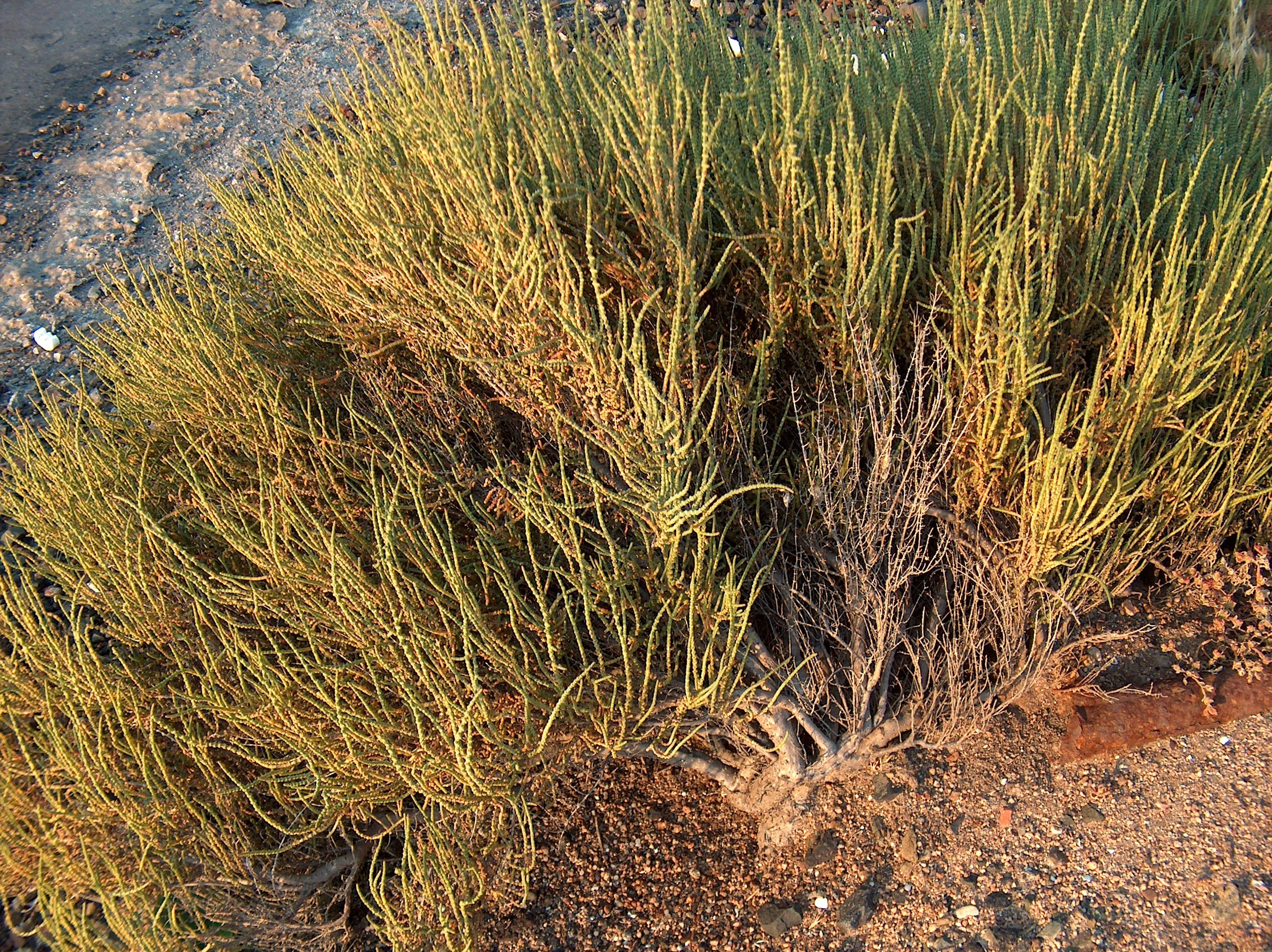

Scientific classification
- Kingdom: Plantae
- Clade: Tracheophytes
- Clade: Angiosperms
- Clade: Eudicots
- Order: Caryophyllales
- Family: Amaranthaceae
- Genus: Halocnemum
- Species: H. strobilaceum

Binomial name
- Halocnemum strobilaceum (Pall.) Bieb., 1819

= Halocnemum strobilaceum =

Species of plant

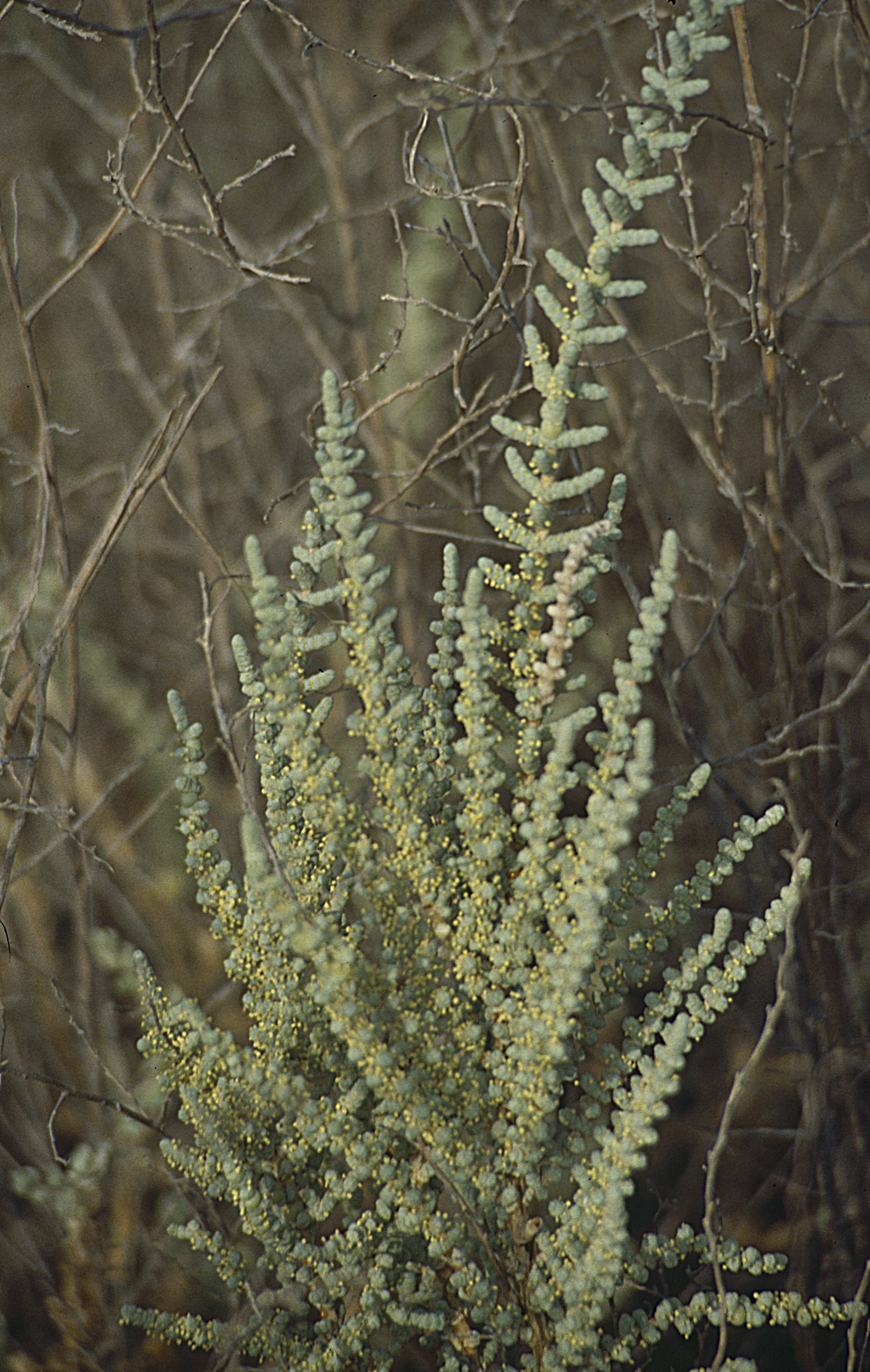
Halocnemum strobilaceum

Halocnemum strobilaceum is a species of flowering plant in the subfamily Salicornioideae of the family Amaranthaceae. It is native to coastal areas of the Mediterranean Sea and the Red Sea and parts of the Middle East and central Asia, where it grows in coastal and inland salt marshes, alkali flats, and other habitats with saline soils.

== Description ==
Halocnemum strobilaceum is a much-branched, semi-prostrate, sub-shrub with erect branches up to a metre or so high. The woody stems at the base are jointed and have sterile, rounded or conical shaped buds, arranged in whorls on the terminal part of each portion. The erect stems are cylindrical and succulent, with green joints that turn yellow as they age. The stubby, bluish-green, scale-like leaves clasp the stem at each node. The flowers are hermaphrodite and very small, and are arranged in whorls of three on the upper part of the branches.

== Distribution and habitat ==
Halocnemum strobilaceum is found around the coasts bordering on the Mediterranean Sea and the Red Sea. It is also present in the Middle East and central Asia as far east as Mongolia and China. In Iran and Pakistan, it grows in the muddy coastal swamps immediately inland from the mangroves (Avicennia marina) that border the coast of the Persian Gulf. In the delta region of the Mediterranean coast of Egypt, it dominates some plant communities in the salt marsh habitats. In Abu Dhabi it grows in lagoons with muddy substrates in association with Arthrocnemum macrostachyum, and along the storm ridges of shelly sand that form higher up the beach. Gelatinous crusts of cyanobacteria sometimes form in depressions in the ground, and when these get dusted with windblown sand, H. strobilaceum colonises these habitats too. It grows along the sandy Tunisian coast, forming hummocks, growing alongside Bassia muricata, Cutandia memphitica and Traganum nudatum.

In northwestern China in the provinces of Xinjiang and Gansu, it is one of the dominant plants on saline plains, on the shores of salt lakes and at the edges of alluvial fans. Along with glasswort and A. macrostachyum, H. strobilaceum was one of the first plants to recolonise oil-polluted marshland in the Persian Gulf after the soil had been churned up and aerated by the action of crabs.

== Gallery ==
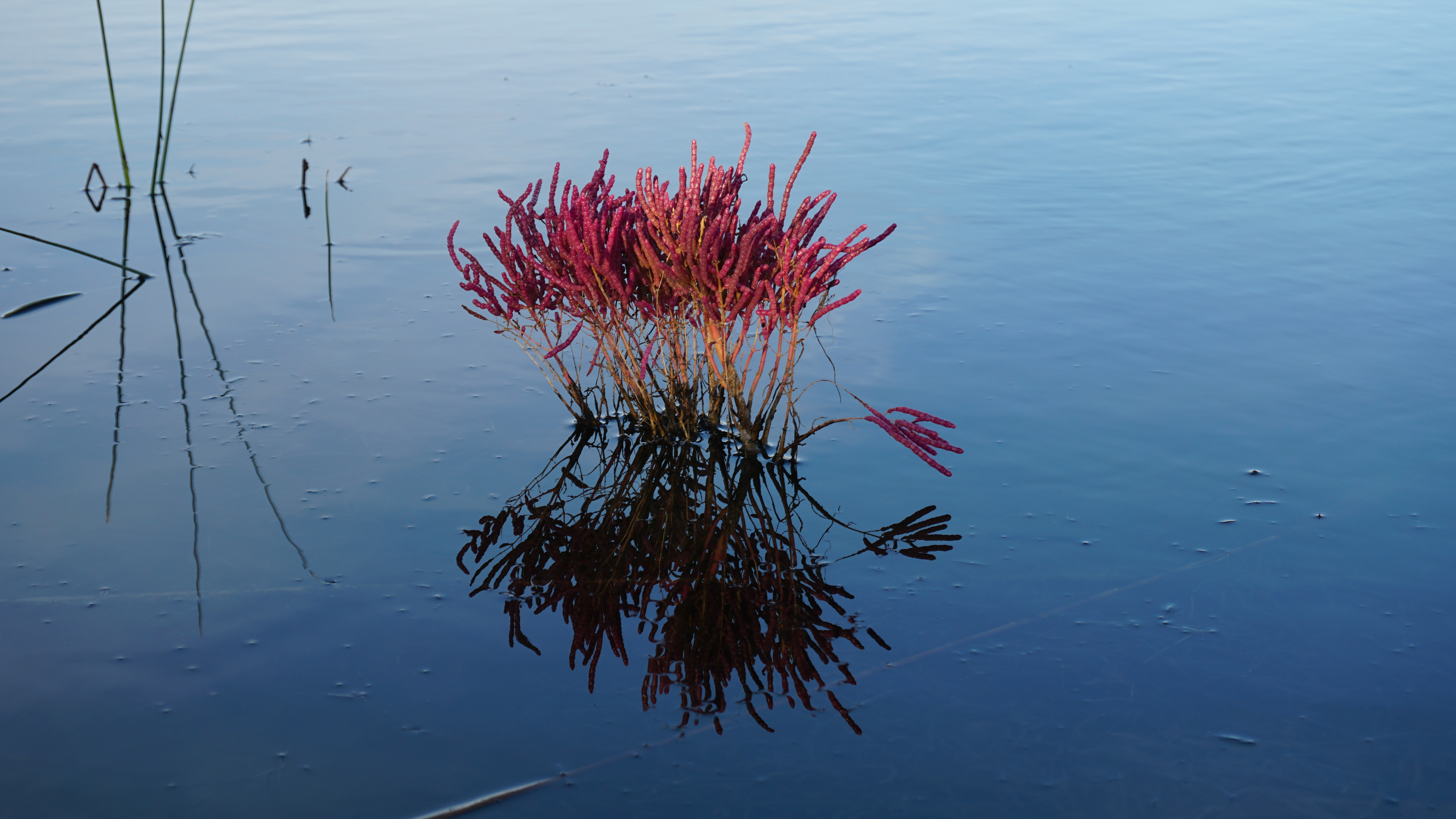
Halocnemum strobilaceum. Prokopos Lagoon, Western Achaia, Greece.

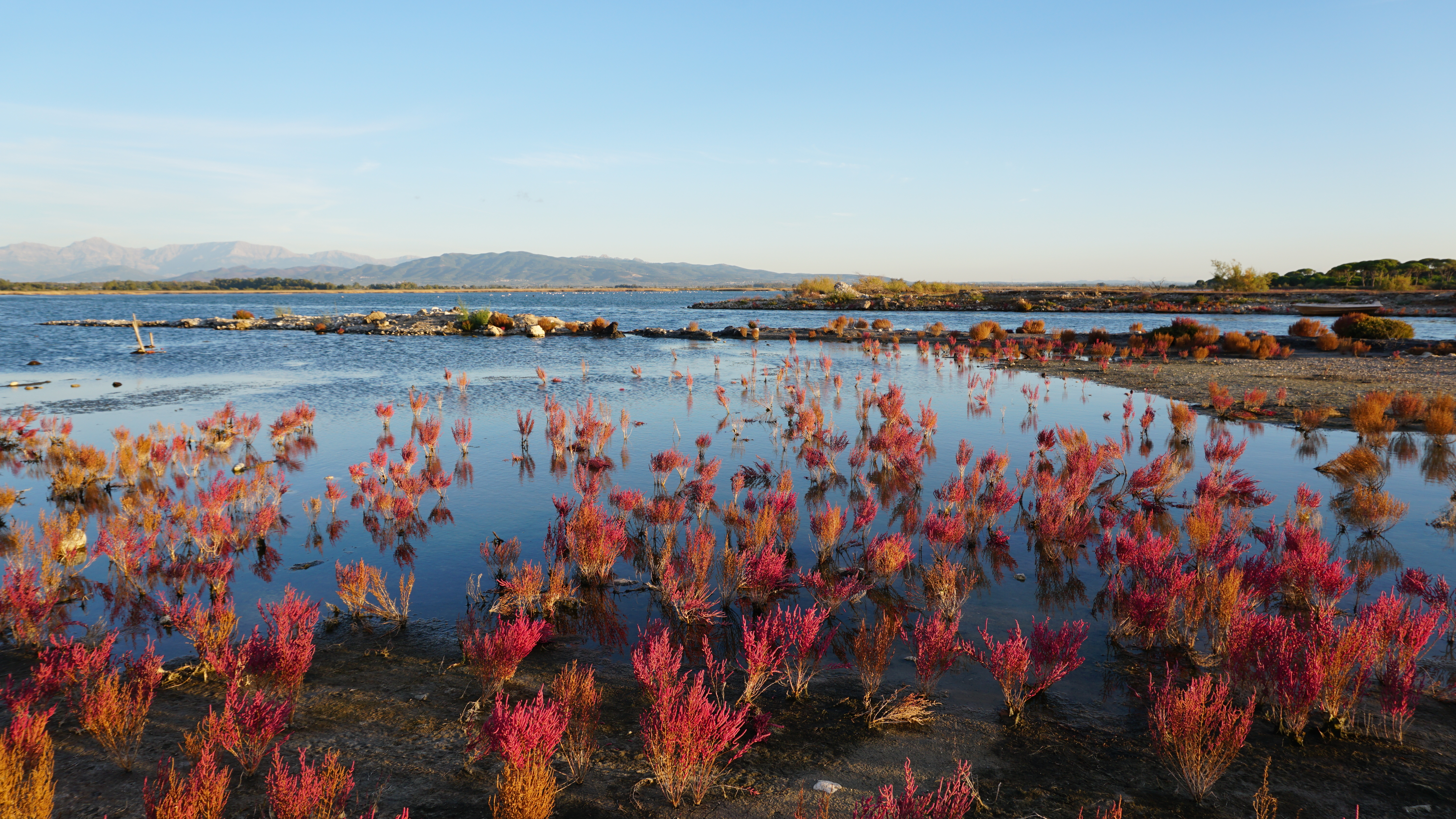
Halocnemum strobilaceum. Prokopos Lagoon, Western Achaia, Greece.

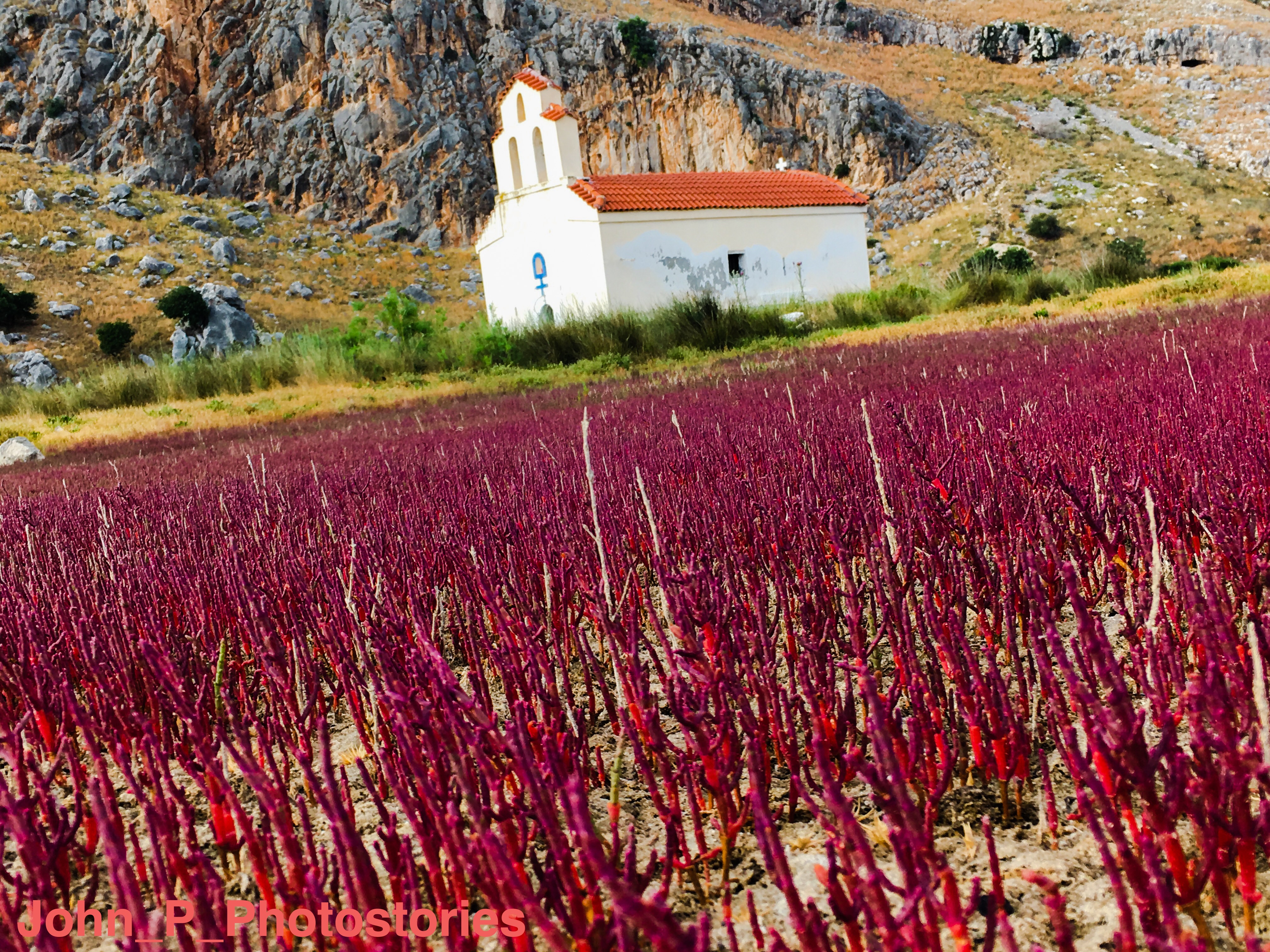
Halocnemum strobilaceum. Prokopos Lagoon, Western Achaia, Greece.
