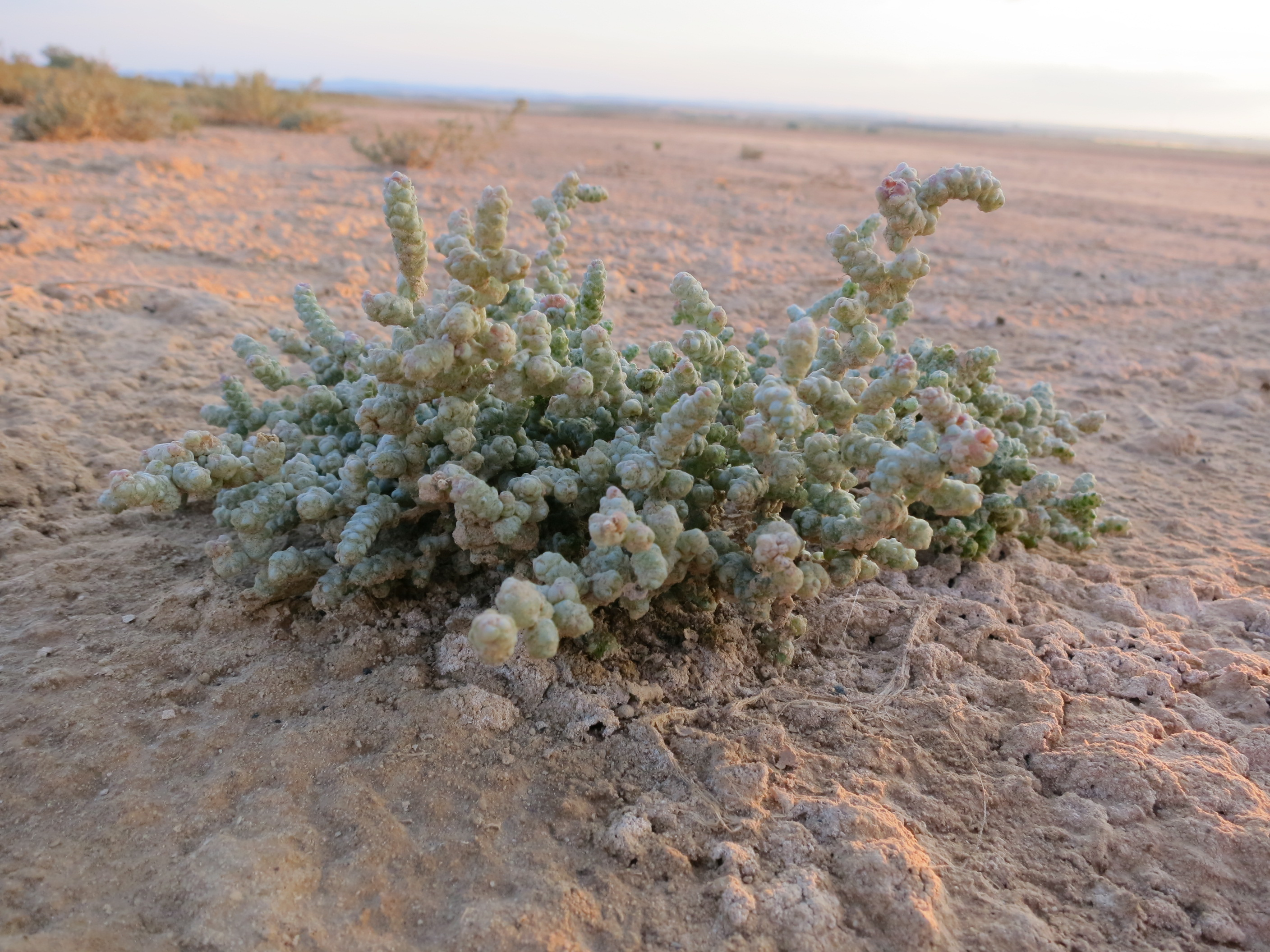
- Halopeplis amplexicaulis

Scientific classification
- Kingdom: Plantae
- Clade: Tracheophytes
- Clade: Angiosperms
- Clade: Eudicots
- Order: Caryophyllales
- Family: Amaranthaceae
- Subfamily: Salicornioideae
- Genus: Halopeplis; Bunge ex Ung.-Sternb.

Species
- 3 species (see text)

= Halopeplis =

Genus of flowering plants

Halopeplis is a genus in the family Amaranthaceae. The plants are halophytes with not articulated stems and fleshy stem-clasping leaves. There are three species, occurring from the Mediterranean basin and North Africa to Southwest Asia and Central Asia.

== Description ==
The species of Halopeplis are succulent annual ore perennial herbs with glabrous, not jointed plant stems. The alternate or nearly opposite leaves are fleshy, glabrous, globular or ovate, sessile and stem-clasping, with distinct or reduced leaf blades.

The cylindrical spike-like inflorescences are standing laterally or terminally in the upper parts of the plants. In spirally arranged cymes groups of three flowers are sitting in the axils of fleshy bracts. The mostly bisexual flowers are immersed in the inflorescence axis and more or less connate to each other, to the bract, and to the axis. The inconspicuously three-lobed perianth consists of three connate tepals. There are one ore two (rarely three) stamens shortly exserting the flower, and an ovary with two stigmas.

The fruit remains enclosed in the inflorescence axis, the fruit wall (pericarp) is membranous. The seed is ovoid to circular, compressed, with leathery, smooth or papillose seed coat. The seed contains the half-annular, uncinate or curved embryo and copious perisperm (feeding tissue).

== Distribution and habitat ==
The distribution area of Halopeplis covers the Mediterranean region, North Africa, Southwest Asia, Central Asia to China (Xinjiang).

The plants are halophytes and grow on wet salty soils at sea shores, lagoons, or inland at the edge of salt lakes and in saline mudflats.

== Systematics ==
The genus Halopeplis was first published in 1866 by Franz Ungern-Sternberg. In 1857, Alexander Bunge had introduced the name Halopeplis, but without a valid description. The lectotype of the genus is Halopeplis nodulosa, which is a synonym of Halopeplis amplexicaulis.

The genus Halopeplis comprises three species:

- Halopeplis amplexicaulis (Vahl) Ung.-Sternb. ex Ces., Pass. & Gibelli: annual, occurring in inland salt flats and at salt lakes, distributed in the southern Mediterranean Basin and in North Africa.
- Halopeplis perfoliata (Forssk.) Bunge ex Asch. & Schweinf.: perennial, occurring at sea shores from the Red Sea, Sinai Peninsula, Arabian Peninsula, to southwestern Pakistan (Baluchistan).
- Halopeplis pygmaea (Pall.) Bunge ex Ung.-Sternb.: annual, occurring in inland salt flats and at salt lakes, distributed from the North Caucasus, Caspian Sea, southern Iraq, Iran, Central Asia to China (Xinjiang).
