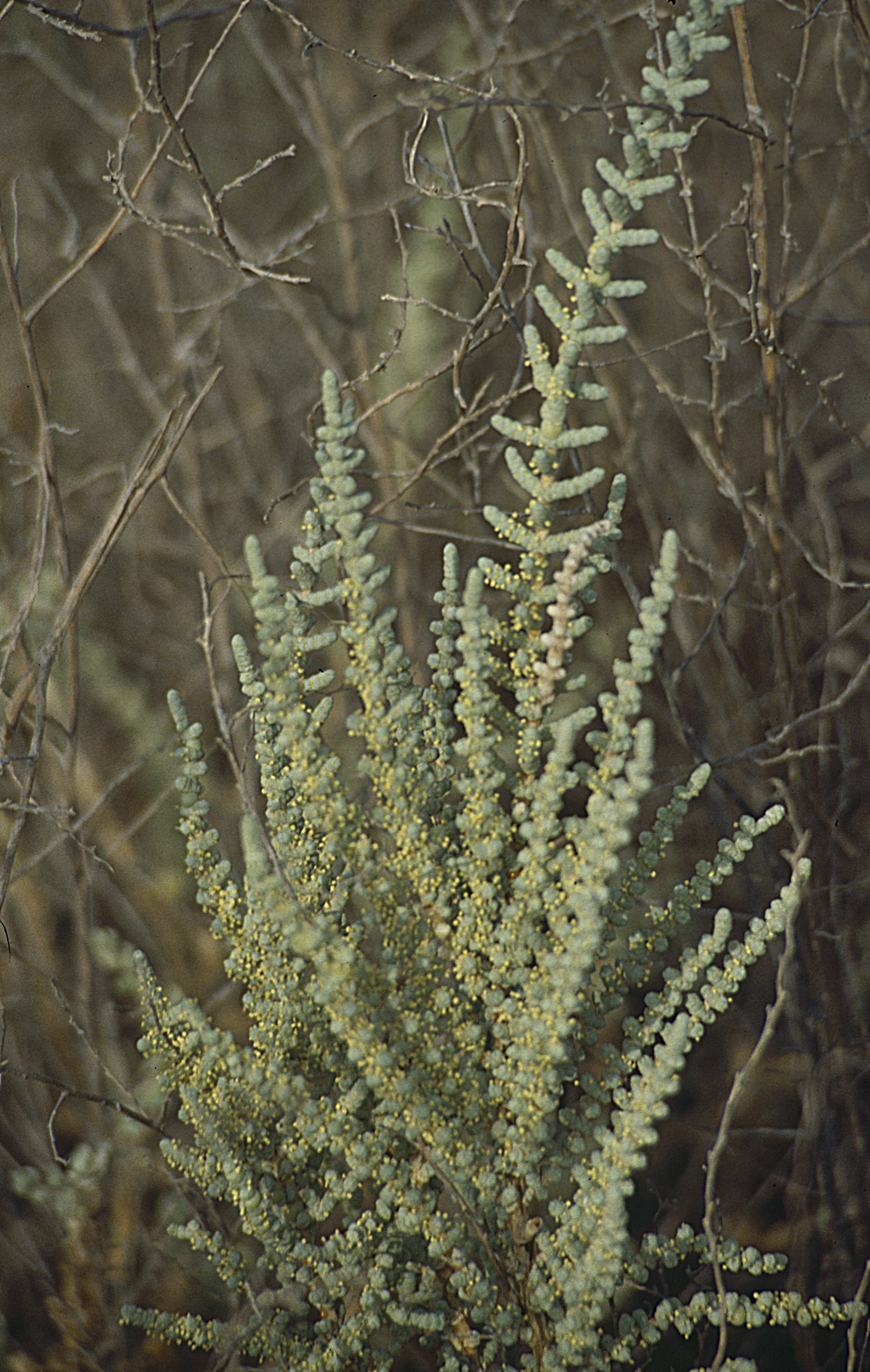
- Halocnemum strobilaceum

Scientific classification
- Kingdom: Plantae
- Clade: Tracheophytes
- Clade: Angiosperms
- Clade: Eudicots
- Order: Caryophyllales
- Family: Amaranthaceae
- Subfamily: Salicornioideae
- Genus: Halocnemum; M.Bieb. (1819)

Species
- 3; see text

Synonyms
- Halimocnemum Lindem. (1880); Sarcathria Raf. (1837), nom. superfl.

= Halocnemum =

Genus of flowering plants

Halocnemum is a genus of halophytic shrubs in the family Amaranthaceae. The plants are fleshy and apparently articulated with characteristic globular or short-cylindrical lateral branches, and reduced leaves and flowers. There are three or two species, occurring from Southern Europe and North Africa to Asia.

== Description ==
The species of Halocnemum are subshrubs or low shrubs up to 1.5 m, much branched from base. Young stems are succulent, glabrous, apparently articulated, with characteristic globular to short-cylindrical lateral branches. The opposite leaves are fleshy, glabrous, sessile, joined at base and surrounding the stem, their blades reduced to small scales.

The inflorescences are terminal or numerous opposite lateral, short-cylindrical or orbicular spikes. Cymes of (two to) three flowers are sitting in the axils of shield-like, opposite bracts. The mostly bisexual flowers are somewhat immersed in the inflorescence axis. The perianth consists of three subequal, membranous tepals that are loosely connate at base. There is one stamen exserting the flower and an ovoid ovary with a thick style and two stigmas.

In fruit the perianth remains unchanged. The fruit is obovoid and free. The vertical seed is orange to red-brown, with slightly papillose seed coat. The seed contains the curved embryo and copious perisperm (feeding tissue).

== Distribution and habitat ==
The distribution area of Halocnemum covers Southern Europe, the Mediterranean region, North Africa, Eastern Europe, Southwest Asia, Middle Asia to China (Xinjiang, Gansu).

The plants grow in coastal salt marshes or wet inland salt flats, sabkhas, on salty clay, in salt steppes or dried river beds, up to 1200 m above sea level.

== Systematics ==
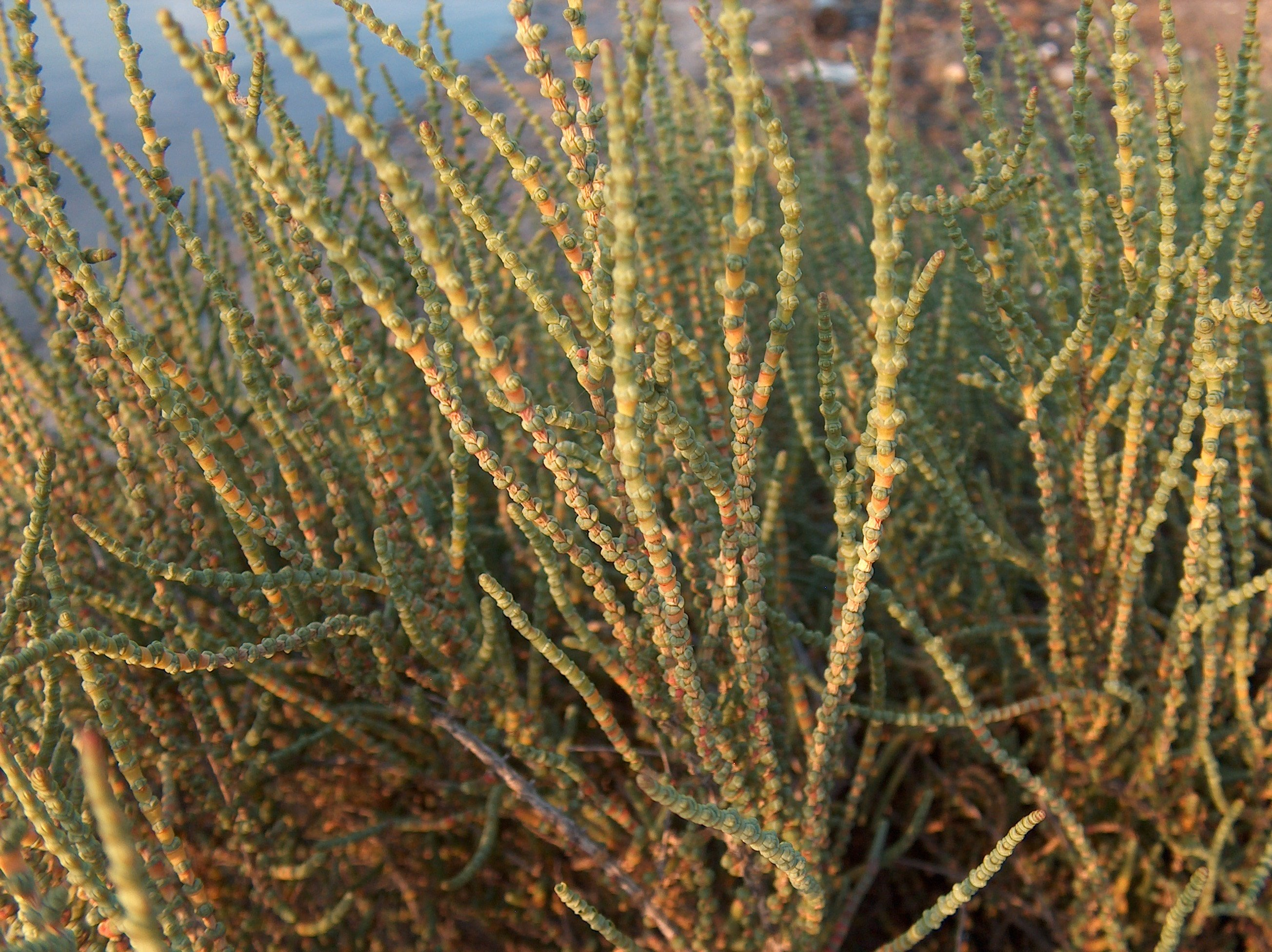
Halocnemum cruciatum

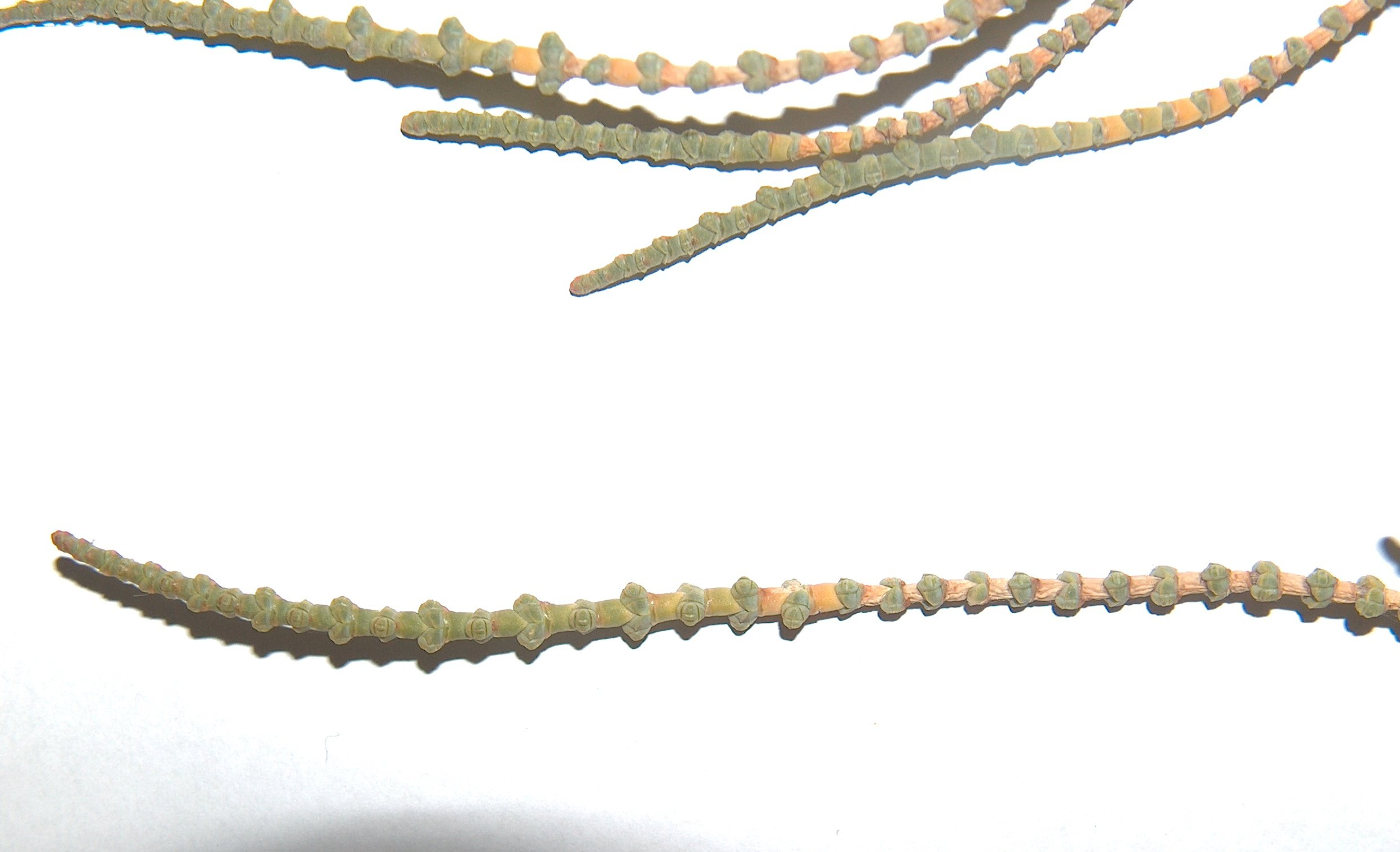
twigs of Halocnemum cruciatum with globular lateral branches

The genus Halocnemum was first published in 1819 by Friedrich August Marschall von Bieberstein, at that time comprising two species, Halocnemum strobilaceum and Halocnemum caspicum (the latter is now a synonym of Halostachys belangeriana). Halocnemum strobilaceum was selected as the type species. During the 19th century further species were added, later these were grouped into other genera or treated just as synonyms of Halocnemum strobilaceum. For many years the genus Halocnemum has been regarded as monotypic. In 2008, the new species Halocnemum yurdakulolii was discovered, although some treat it as a synonym of Halocnemum cruciatum in 2012.

Phylogenetic research confirmed, that Halocnemum is closely related to the genus Halostachys.

=== Species ===
According to Bacchetta et al. (2012) and Biondi et al. (2013), Halocnemum comprises two species. Plants of the World Online (2024) also accepts H. yurdakulolii.

- Halocnemum cruciatum (Forssk.) Tod., an upright shrub up to 1,5 m, pale yellowish-green, all lateral branches globular, and seeds papillose along the raphe (seed-edge). Distributed mainly at the coasts of the Mediterranean Sea: southern Spain and southern Italy (Sicily, Sardinia), Tunisia, Egypt, Libya (Cyrenaica), Cyprus, southern coast of Turkey, more rarely in inland (Sinai Peninsula, Morocco, salt basins of the Sahara and the Saharo-Arabian area).
- Halocnemum strobilaceum (Pall.) M. Bieb.: a dwarf prostrate-ascendent shrub up to 60 cm, glaucous, with globular or cylindrical lateral branches and spikes, and more or less smooth seeds. Widely distributed in Eastern Europe (from Italy and Greece to Ukraine) and in Asia (Anatolia, Caucasus region, Iran, Iraq, Afghanistan, Pakistan, Arabia, Kazakhstan, Siberia, Mongolia, western China).
- Halocnemum yurdakulolii Yaprak, endemic to southern Turkey. Bacchetta et al. treat it as a synonym of H. cruciatum.

== Uses ==
Halocnemum strobilaceum has small economic value as a grazing plant for camels and sheep. Plants are very good prime colonizers and are often used to rehabilitate pastures on highly saline soils. They are used as source of potash and as fuel by nomadic tribes.
