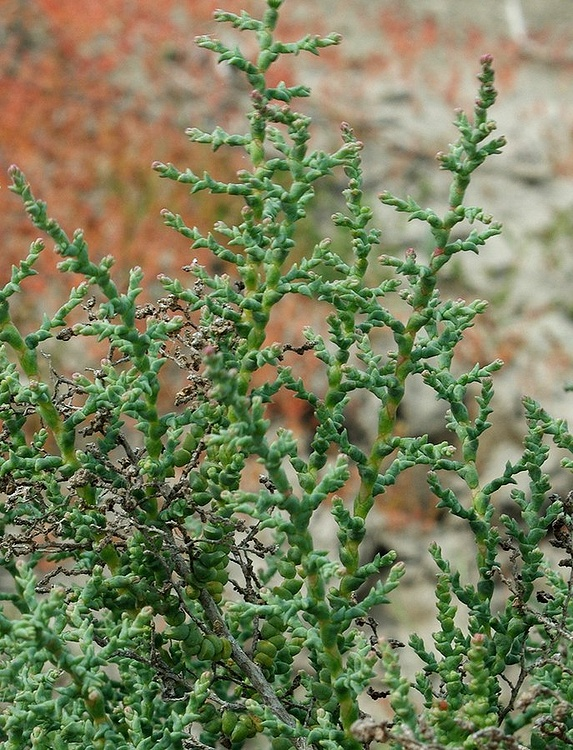
- Kalidium caspicum

Scientific classification
- Kingdom: Plantae
- Clade: Tracheophytes
- Clade: Angiosperms
- Clade: Eudicots
- Order: Caryophyllales
- Family: Amaranthaceae
- Subfamily: Salicornioideae
- Genus: Kalidium; Moq.

Species
- 6 species, see text

= Kalidium =

Genus of flowering plants

Kalidium is a genus of flowering plants in the plant family Amaranthaceae. The species are shrubby halophytes distributed in Southeast Europe, Southwest Asia and Central Asia to China.

== Description ==
The species of Kalidium grow as subshrubs or low shrubs. The stems are much branched and glabrous. Older stems are not jointed, younger stems may appear jointed or not. The alternate leaves are fleshy, glabrous, stem-clasping and decurrent, nearly orbicular to semiterete, their free blades 0.5–12 mm long.

The pedunculate inflorescences are spike-like, with alternate scale-like free bracts. In the axil of each bract, there are one to three flowers, partially fused to each other, to the bract and to the inflorescence axis, appearing sunken into fleshy axis. The flowers are bisexual. The 4-5-lobed perianth consists of four to five connate tepals. There are two stamens and an ovoid ovary with two stigmas.

In fruiting phase, the perianth becomes thick and spongy and encloses the fruit. Towards the apex, the perianth is widened, flattened, and furnished with a wing-like margin. The fruit wall (pericarp) is membranous. The vertical seed is disc-shaped with tuberculate to papillose surface. It contains a semi-annular embryo and copious perisperm (feeding tissue).

== Distribution and habitat ==
The species of Kalidium are distributed from Southeast Europe to Southwest Asia and Central Asia to China.

The plants are halophytes and grow in saline mudflats, on alkaline soils, at margins of alluvial fans, and at the shores of salt lakes.

== Systematics ==
The genus Kalidium was first published in 1849 by Alfred Moquin-Tandon. Kalidium foliatum was chosen as lectotype of the genus. A synonym is Kalidiopsis Aellen.

The genus comprises six species:

- Kalidium caspicum (L.) Ung.-Sternb. - widely distributed from Southeast Europe, Caucasus and eastern Turkey, Southwest Asia, and Central Asia to China (northern Xinjiang).
- Kalidium cuspidatum (Ung.-Sternb.) Grubov - occurring in Mongolia and China (Gansu, Hebei, Inner Mongolia, Ningxia, Qinghai, Shaanxi, Xinjiang).
- Kalidium foliatum (Pall.) Moq. - widely distributed from Southeast Europe, Southwest Asia, Central Asia, Russia (southern Siberia), Mongolia, to China (northern Gansu, northern Hebei, Heilongjiang, Inner Mongolia, Ningxia, Qinghai, Xinjiang).
- Kalidium gracile Fenzl - occurring in Mongolia and China (Inner Mongolia, Xinjiang).
- Kalidium schrenkianum Bunge ex Ung.-Sternb. - occurring in Kazakhstan and China (Xinjiang).
- Kalidium wagenitzii (Aellen) Freitag & G.Kadereit (Syn.: Kalidiopsis wagenitzii Aellen) - endemic in Turkey (Anatolia, Tuz Gölü area). This species has sometimes been included in Kalidium foliatum.
