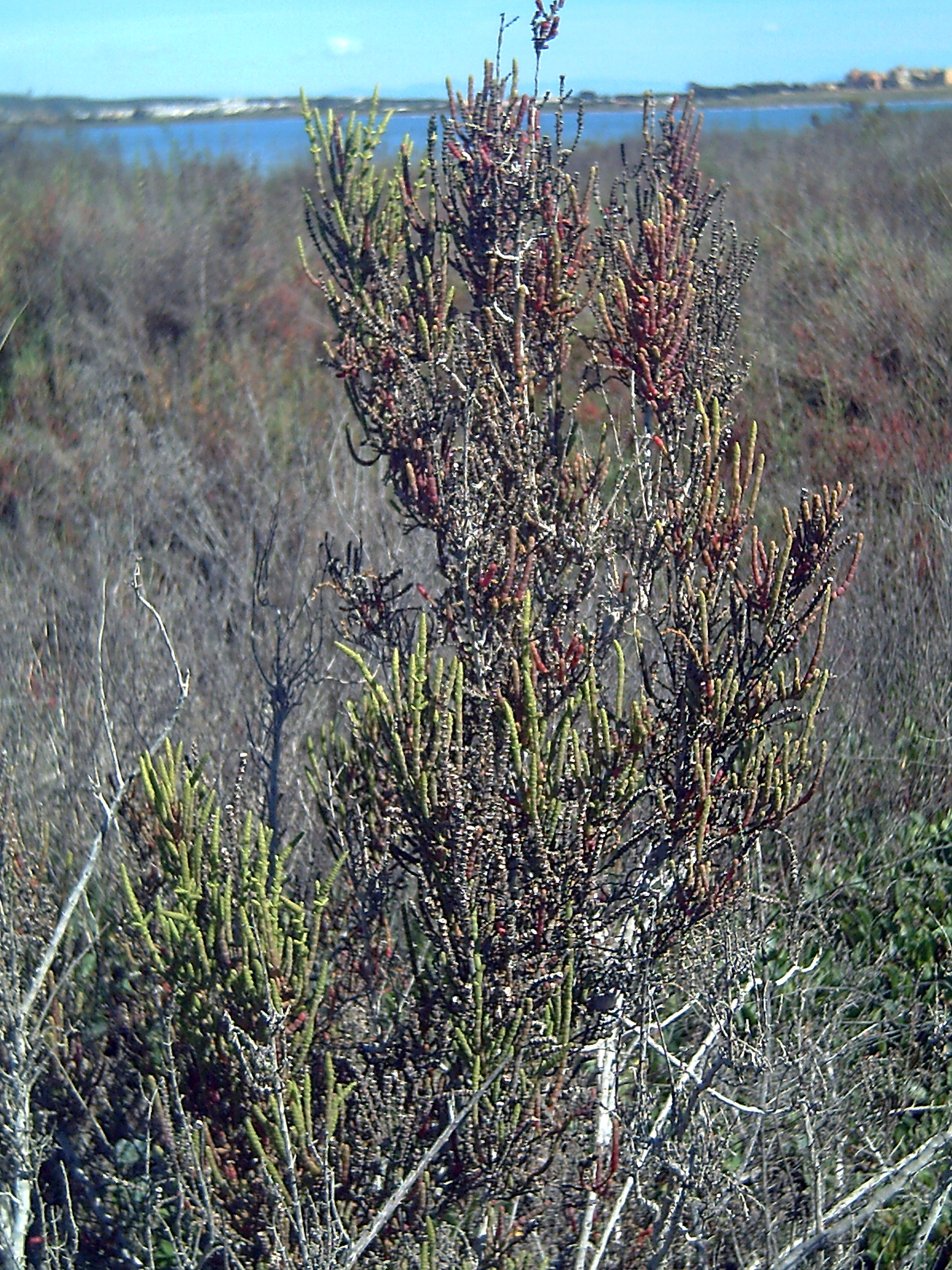
- Arthrocnemum macrostachyum

Scientific classification
- Kingdom: Plantae
- Clade: Tracheophytes
- Clade: Angiosperms
- Clade: Eudicots
- Order: Caryophyllales
- Family: Amaranthaceae
- Subfamily: Salicornioideae
- Genus: Arthrocaulon; Piirainen & G.Kadereit

= Arthrocaulon =

Genus of flowering plants

Arthrocaulon is a genus of flowering plants belonging to the family Amaranthaceae.

Its native range is Macaronesia, Mediterranean to Arabian Peninsula and Senegal, Angola.

Species:

- Arthrocaulon franzii (Sukhor.) Piirainen & G.Kadereit
- Arthrocaulon macrostachyum (Moric.) Piirainen & G.Kadereit
- Arthrocaulon meridionalis Est.Ramírez, Rufo, Sánchez Mata & Fuente
