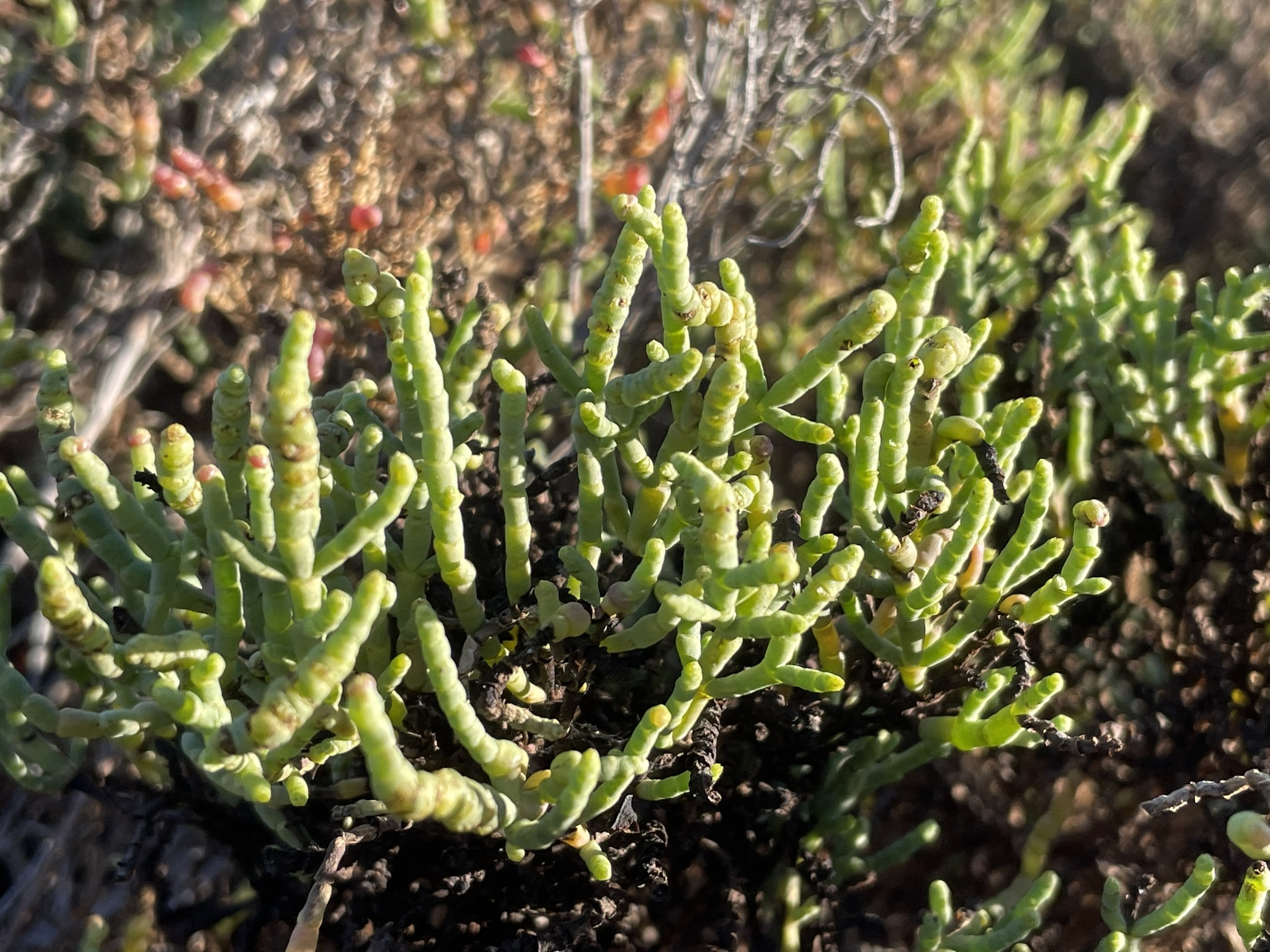

Scientific classification
- Kingdom: Plantae
- Clade: Tracheophytes
- Clade: Angiosperms
- Clade: Eudicots
- Order: Caryophyllales
- Family: Amaranthaceae
- Subfamily: Salicornioideae
- Genus: Arthroceras
- Species: A. subterminale

Binomial name
- Arthroceras subterminale (Parish) Piirainen & G.Kadereit

Synonyms
- Arthrocnemum subterminale (Parish) Standl.; Salicornia subterminalis Parish

= Arthroceras subterminale =

Species of flowering plant

Arthroceras subterminale is a species of flowering plant in the Amaranth family known by the common name Parish's glasswort. It is the only species in the genus Arthroceras. This coastal and inland California native plant is a shrub that is found southerly into northern Mexico, also in both coastal and inland areas, including salt marshes, alkali flats, and other habitats with saline soils.

As a halophyte, capable of growing in substrates with high salt concentrations, this glasswort is a perennial herb or subshrub growing in low clumps up to a meter wide mature plants having woody bases branching into fleshy, jointed green stems. The leaves appear as fused rings around stem, the tip of each individual blade narrowing to a point. The inflorescence is a fleshy, sticklike spike of minute flowers, each flower just a pocket made up of the joined sepals; there are no petals.
