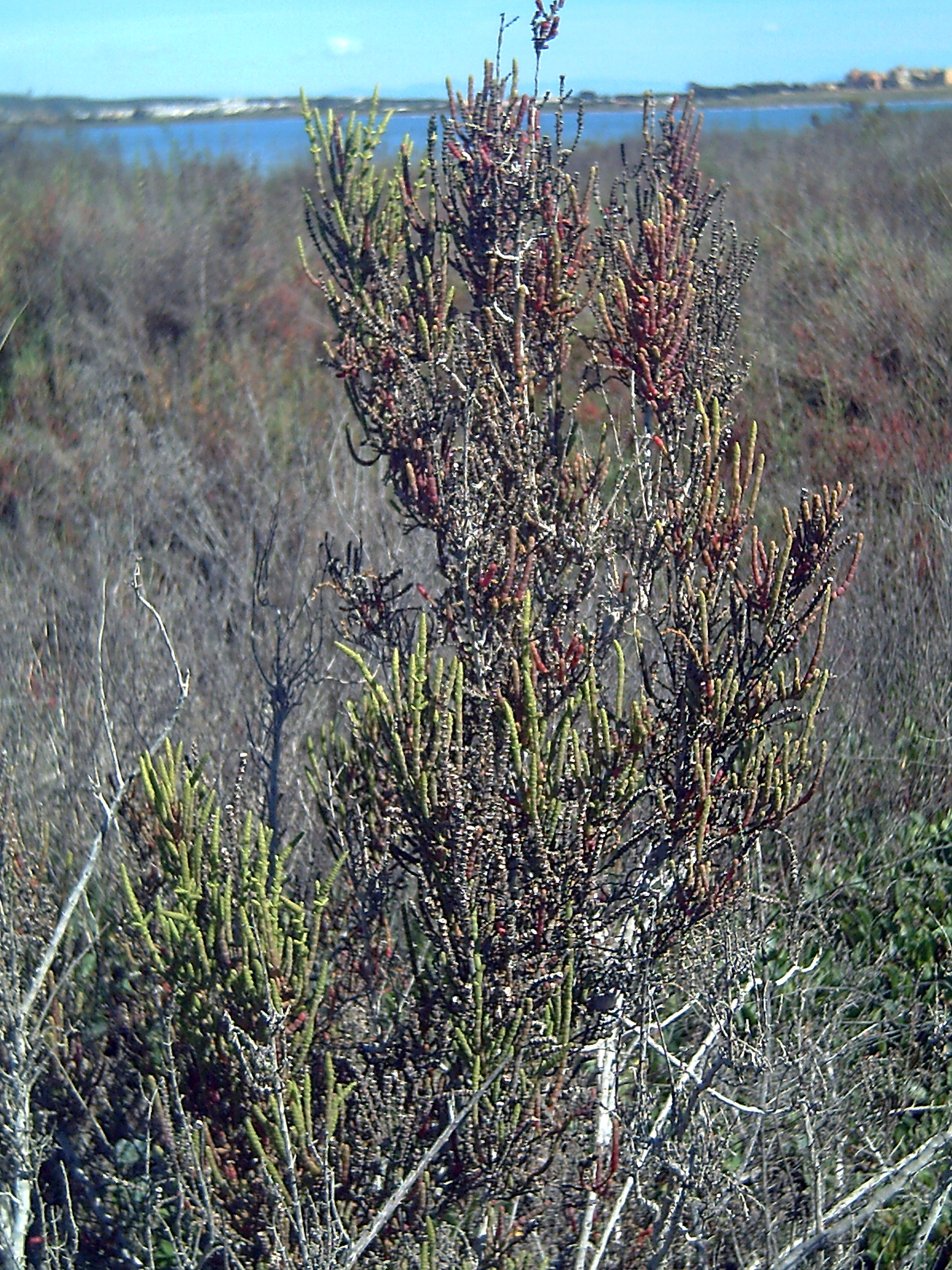

Scientific classification
- Kingdom: Plantae
- Clade: Tracheophytes
- Clade: Angiosperms
- Clade: Eudicots
- Order: Caryophyllales
- Family: Amaranthaceae
- Genus: Arthrocaulon
- Species: A. macrostachyum

Binomial name
- Arthrocaulon macrostachyum (Moric.) Piirainen & G.Kadereit

Synonyms
- Arthrocnemum fruticosum var. glaucum Moq.; Arthrocnemum fruticosum var. macrostachyum (Moric.) Moq.; Arthrocnemum glaucum (Moq.) Ung.-Sternb.; Arthrocnemum macrostachyum (Moric.) K.Koch; Halocnemum glaucum C.Presl; Salicornia arbuscula Moric. ex Steud.; Salicornia glauca Delile; Salicornia macrostachya Moric.; Salicornia virginica Forssk.

= Arthrocaulon macrostachyum =

Species of flowering plant

Arthrocaulon macrostachyum, synonym Arthrocnemum macrostachyum, is a species of flowering plant in the amaranth family. It is native to coastal areas of the Mediterranean Sea and the Red Sea and parts of the Middle East, where it grows in coastal and inland salt marshes, alkali flats, and other habitats with saline soils.

== Description ==
Arthrocaulon macrostachyum is a much-branched subshrub growing in clumps up to a metre high (3 ft). The plants have horizontal woody stems that may root at the nodes, branching into erect, jointed, succulent green stems. The leaves are small and scale-like, clasping the stem but with the tips free. The flowers are minute, produced in threes in terminal, cylindrical spikes. The perianth is conical and has three teeth. The hermaphrodite flowers are wind-pollinated, and the fruit is small, has a membranous pericarp, and contains a single seed.

== Distribution and habitat ==
A. macrostachyum is found around the coasts bordering on the Mediterranean Sea and the Red Sea, and ranges northwards into the Jordan Valley. It is also present in the Middle East, including Iran and Pakistan, where it grows in the muddy coastal swamps immediately inland from the mangroves (Avicennia marina) that border the coast. In the delta region of the Mediterranean coast of Egypt, it dominates some plant communities in the salt marsh habitats.

== Research ==
In a study, plants of A. macrostachyum were germinated at six sodium chloride (NaCl) concentrations, and grew best at 200 to 400 mM NaCl. It was found that the plants were salt-tolerant and grew well at a range of salt concentrations. About 60% of their dry mass was ash, and the plants were capable of accumulating a substantial quantity of sodium and chlorine ions. The seeds of many halophytes germinate after rains which reduce the salinity levels of the soil surface layer. A. macrostachyum can germinate at salinity levels of at least 800 mM NaCl, and at even higher concentrations in the presence of added calcium ions.

Research was undertaken into the remediation of oil-contaminated soil in the Persian Gulf. The marshland concerned was covered by an algal mat but was otherwise vegetation-free. The creation of drainage channels was followed by the return of crabs to the affected areas close to the channels. They churned up the mud and increased the oxygen content, which was quickly followed by the germination of A. macrostachyum, Halocnemum strobilaceum and Salicornia europaea. The crabs advanced into the polluted area at the rate of about one metre per year (3 ft), resulting in a gradual increase in the vegetated area.

A. macrostachyum tolerates levels of cadmium in the soil that other plants find toxic. It can bioaccumulate the metal and play a role in the phytoremediation of sites contaminated by cadmium.

The seeds of A. macrostachyum contain between 22% and 25% oil, with an unsaturated fatty acid content of 65% to 74%, and are being investigated as a possible source of edible oil.
