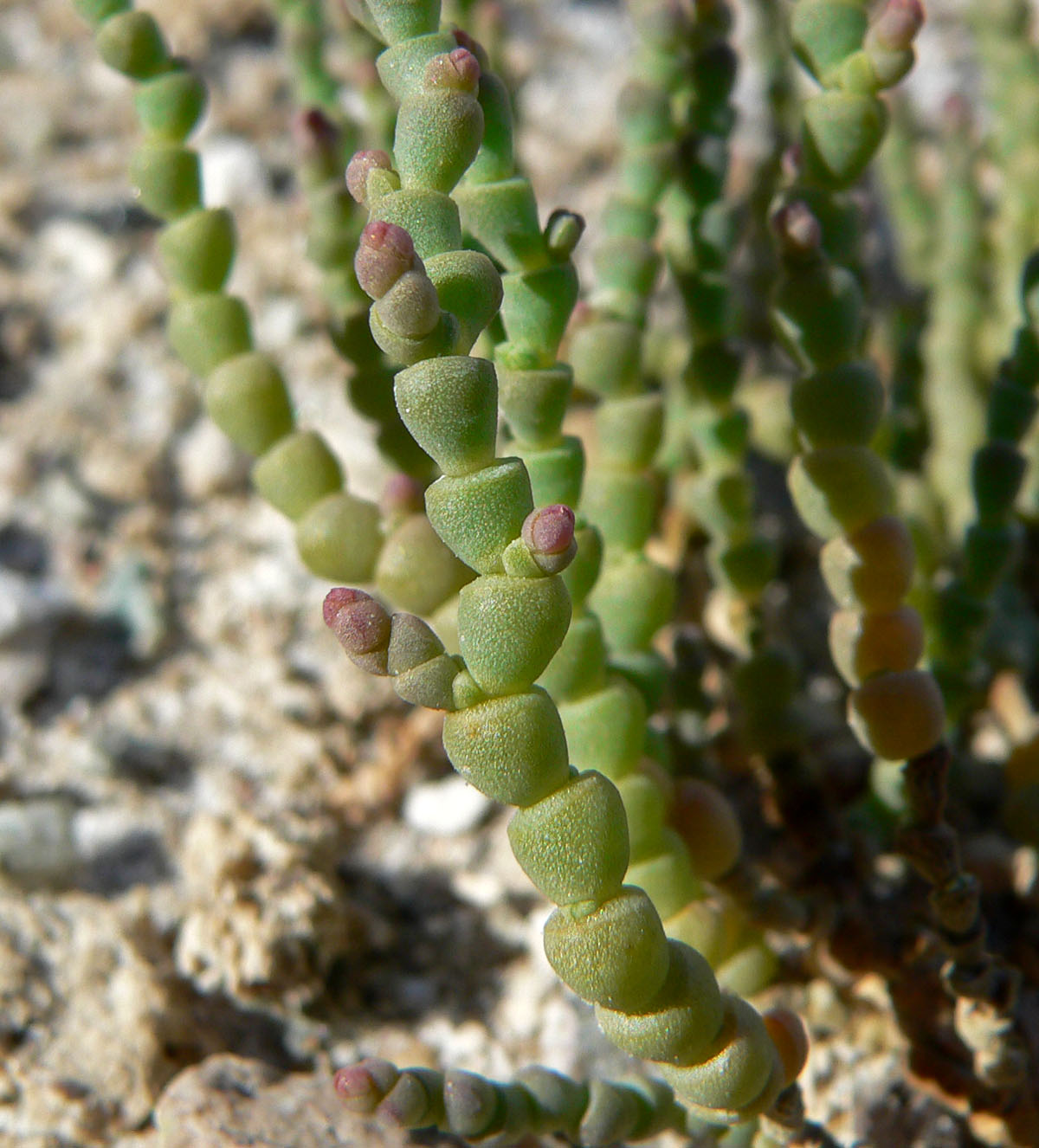

Conservation status
- Secure (NatureServe)

Scientific classification
- Kingdom: Plantae
- Clade: Tracheophytes
- Clade: Angiosperms
- Clade: Eudicots
- Order: Caryophyllales
- Family: Amaranthaceae
- Genus: Allenrolfea
- Species: A. occidentalis

Binomial name
- Allenrolfea occidentalis (S.Wats.) Kuntze

Synonyms
- Allenrolfea mexicana Lundell; Halostachys occidentalis S. Watson

= Allenrolfea occidentalis =

Iodinebush

Species of flowering plant

Allenrolfea occidentalis, the iodine bush, is a low-lying shrub of the Southwestern United States, California, Idaho, and northern Mexico.

It grows in sandy, often salty, distinctly alkaline soils, such as desert washes and saline dry lakebeds. It is a common halophyte member of the alkali flat ecosystem.

== Description ==
The knobby green stems are fleshy and appear jointed at the internodes between segments. Often the segments are so short they are nearly round. The leaves appear as flaky scales scattered across the surface of the stems. The genus was named for the English botanist Robert Allen Rolfe. It grows up to 6 ft (1.8 m) tall.

The seeds of iodinebush have been used as food in North America in prehistory.
