= Qurm Nature Reserve =

Estuary and protected area in Muscat, Oman

- IUCN category IV (habitat/species management area)
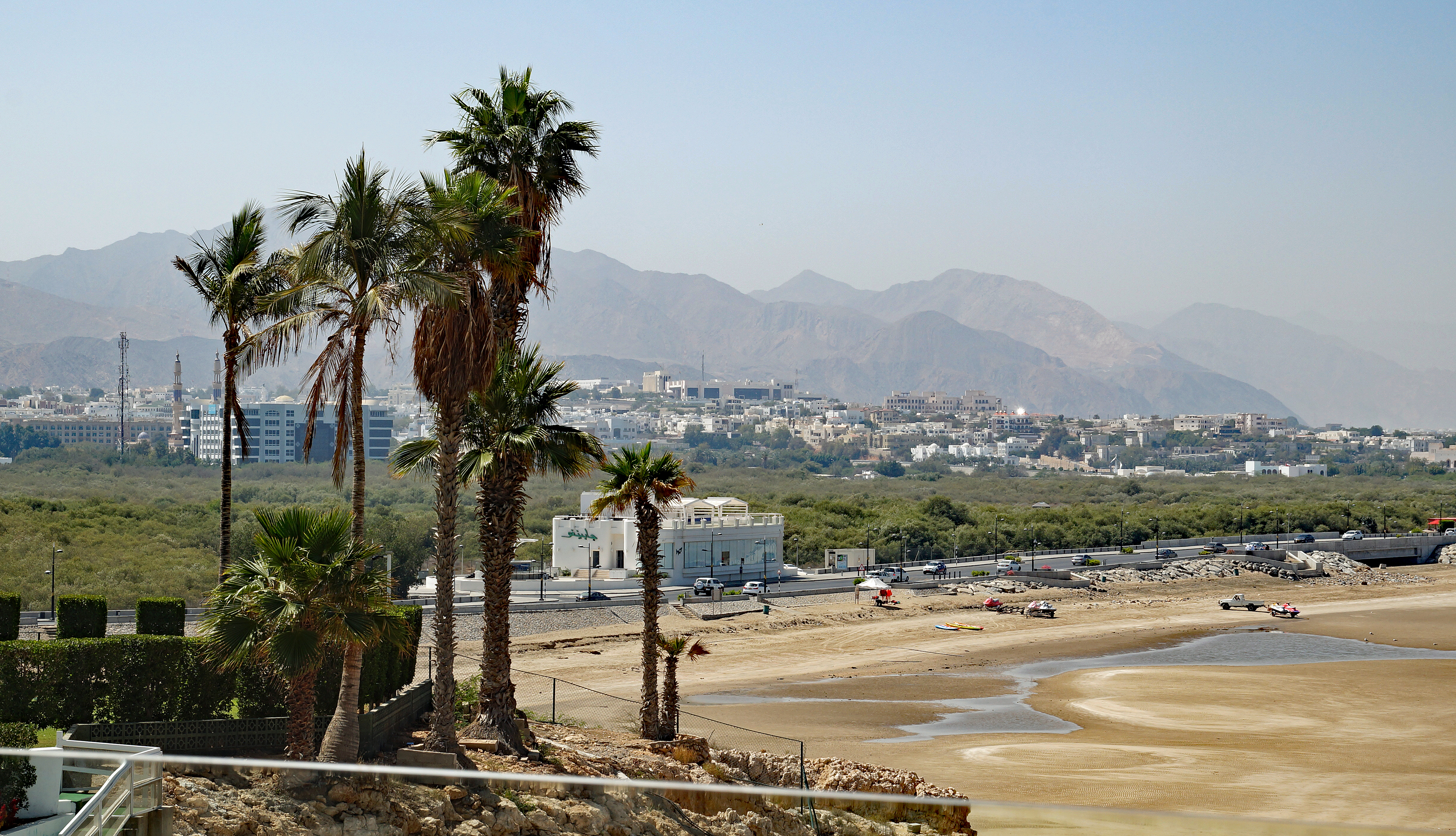
- Qurm wetlands and beach

- Location within Oman
- Location: Muscat Governorate, Oman
- Coordinates: 23°37′12″N 58°28′48″E
- Area: 1.72 km^{2} (0.66 sq mi)
- Established: 1975

Ramsar Wetland
- Official name: Qurm Nature Reserve
- Designated: 19 April 2013
- Reference no.: 2144

Qurm Nature Reserve is a national nature reserve in Muscat Governorate, Oman. Located on the Gulf of Oman coast, the reserve protects a mangrove forest and the surrounding wetland in a small estuary within the urban area of Qurm. Established in 1975, the reserve has been designated as an Important Bird Area since 1994, and as a protected Ramsar site since 2013.

== Features ==
Qurm Nature Reserve is a coastal wetland nature reserve in the urban area of Qurm, in Bawshar Province, Muscat Governorate, in northeastern Oman. Both the town and the reserve are named after a local term for the grey mangroves (القرم, al-qurm) that dominate the ecosystem along the coast. Established in 1975 by a decree of Sultan Qaboos bin Said, the reserve protects an area of roughly 172 ha (430 acres) around the estuary and former delta of Wadi Aday, between the Gulf of Oman coast and the foot of the Hajar Mountains. The reserve was recognized as an Important Bird Area in 1994; 106.8 ha (264 acres) of the lower portion of the reserve were designated as a protected Ramsar site on 19 April 2013.

Moving southeastward from the coast inland, the reserve includes a beach zone that rises to coastal dunes, which separate the beach from an area of sabkha tidal flats cut by tidal channels and gullies. Uphill from this is an alluvial plain of sand and gravel deposited by the wadi, terminating in karstic bedrock outcroppings to the northeast and south. Within the tidal flats, freshwater from several wadis and groundwater flow mixes with saltwater that enters through two main tidal channels to form a polyhaline environment that supports a high level of biodiversity. The region exhibits Oman's characteristic hot desert climate, with hot summers and more evaporation than precipitation.

== Flora and fauna ==
The outermost coastal dunes support Halopyrum mucronatum grasses, transitioning to Sphaerocoma hookeri in less saline parts of the inner dunes and Suaeda fruticosa, Cistanche phelypaea, and Suaeda vermiculata in more saline areas. Sheltered hollows among the dunes exhibit communities of Lotus garcinii, Cyperus conglomeratus, and Heliotropium ramosissimum. In the tidal channels, gullies, and other low-lying areas that are flooded at high tide, the grey mangrove (Avicennia marina) forms dense mangrove forests. The moist, sandy, saline soils of the sabkha flats just above high tide feature Suaeda aegyptiaca, S. fruticosa, Cressa cretica, Aeluropus lagopoides, Halopeplis perfoliata, Arthrocaulon macrostachyum, Zygophyllum qatarense, and other halophytes.

The moderately drained alluvial plain above the sabkha hosts scattered woodland vegetation, featuring Vachellia tortilis, Prosopis cineraria, Ziziphus spina-christi, and Vachellia flava trees, as well as Lycium shawii and Bassia muricata shrubs. The stony hills to the south and northeast feature trees and shrubs similar to the alluvial plain, together with Euphorbia larica, Commiphora myrrha, Grewia tenax, and Ochradenus arabicus trees, shrubs of Cleome brachycarpa, Cometes surattensis, Leucas inflata, Plocama hymenostephana, Seddera latifolia, and Vernonia arabica, and Cenchrus pennisetiformis grasses. The eastern end of the reserve includes an abandoned grove of Phoenix dactylifera date palms that have intermingled with the wild vegetation.

Aquatic animal species found in the wetland include a variety of crabs, such as Gelasimus vocans, Austrua lactea, and Gelasimus tetragonon in the mangrove swamps; Scylla serrata, Portunus pelagicus, Callinectes sapidens, Thalamita sp., and Grapsus tenuicrustatus in the mangrove channels; and Ashtoret lunaris and Ocypode saratan in the tidal channels and on the beach. Notable mollusc species include hooded oysters growing on the mangroves' aerial roots, and giant mangrove whelks in the mud between the mangroves. Many species of finfish live in the wetland, particularly Arabian toothcarp, tiger perch, goby, and common silver-biddy, while the reserve provides a feeding ground and nursery habitat for other species such as mullet, bigeye snapper, shad, carangids, and seabream, as well as commercially important shrimp species. The mangroves' shed leaves feed various marine detritivores.

One study found nearly two hundred bird species in the reserve, such as Kentish plover, black-headed gull, white-cheeked tern, Caspian gull, dunlin, bar-tailed godwit, Socotra cormorant, greater flamingo, little stint, ruddy turnstone, and slender-billed gull. Terrestrial fauna include the Arabian red fox and Balochistan gerbil; sea turtles are thought to have visited the area until recent increases in human development.

== Conservation value ==
Qurm Nature Reserve protects one of the largest mangrove forests in the Gulf of Oman ecoregion, a biome that supports a diverse variety of marine, terrestrial, and avian wildlife. Plankton and detritus from the reserve are transported out to sea by the tides, providing raw material for the marine ecosystems in the adjoining coastal waters. This injection of nutrients increases marine productivity, indirectly supporting the populations of commercially important fish species. Oman is part of the Central Asian-Indian Flyway for migratory birds, and the reserve, like other estuaries, provides a stopover ground where waterbirds can rest and feed during their migrations. The mangrove forest also contributes to shoreline stabilization in the face of tropical storms, and it improves water quality by retaining and filtering storm run-off.

Archaeological studies have found evidence of the presence of Stone Age humans in what is now the reserve as long as 6000 years ago, seasonally harvesting oysters and whelks from the mangrove forests.
