= Scrobipalpa suaedella =

Scientific classification
- Domain: Eukaryota
- Kingdom: Animalia
- Phylum: Arthropoda
- Class: Insecta
- Order: Lepidoptera
- Family: Gelechiidae
- Genus: Scrobipalpa
- Species: S. suaedella

Binomial name
- Scrobipalpa suaedella (Richardson, 1893)

Synonyms
- Lita suaedella Richardson, 1893; Phthorimaea flavidorsella Amsel, 1952; Scrobipalpa hartigi Povolný, 1977

Species of moth

Scrobipalpa suaedella, the sea-blite groundling, is a moth in the family Gelechiidae. It was described by Richardson in 1893. It is found in Libya, Portugal, Spain, France, Italy, Great Britain, Germany, Corsica, Sardinia, Cyprus and Turkey.

The wingspan is about 14 mm (0.55 in). The ground colour of the forewings is ochreous, much marbled with darker and lighter shades of the same colour, and with slate coloured or dark greyish-ochreous scales, which are distributed more or less regularly in single rows along the veins. The hindwings are pale fuscous, with the veins darker. Adults are on wing in June and July in western Europe.

The larvae feed on Suaeda vera and Suaeda maritima. They feed in a gallery amongst the flowers and leaves.
