= Coleophora atriplicivora =

Scientific classification
- Kingdom: Animalia
- Phylum: Arthropoda
- Class: Insecta
- Order: Lepidoptera
- Family: Coleophoridae
- Genus: Coleophora
- Species: C. atriplicivora

Binomial name
- Coleophora atriplicivora Cockerell, 1898

Species of moth

Coleophora atriplicivora is a moth of the family Coleophoridae. It is found in the United States, including New Mexico.

The larvae feed on the seeds of Atriplex and Suaeda species. They create a trivalved, tubular silken case.
