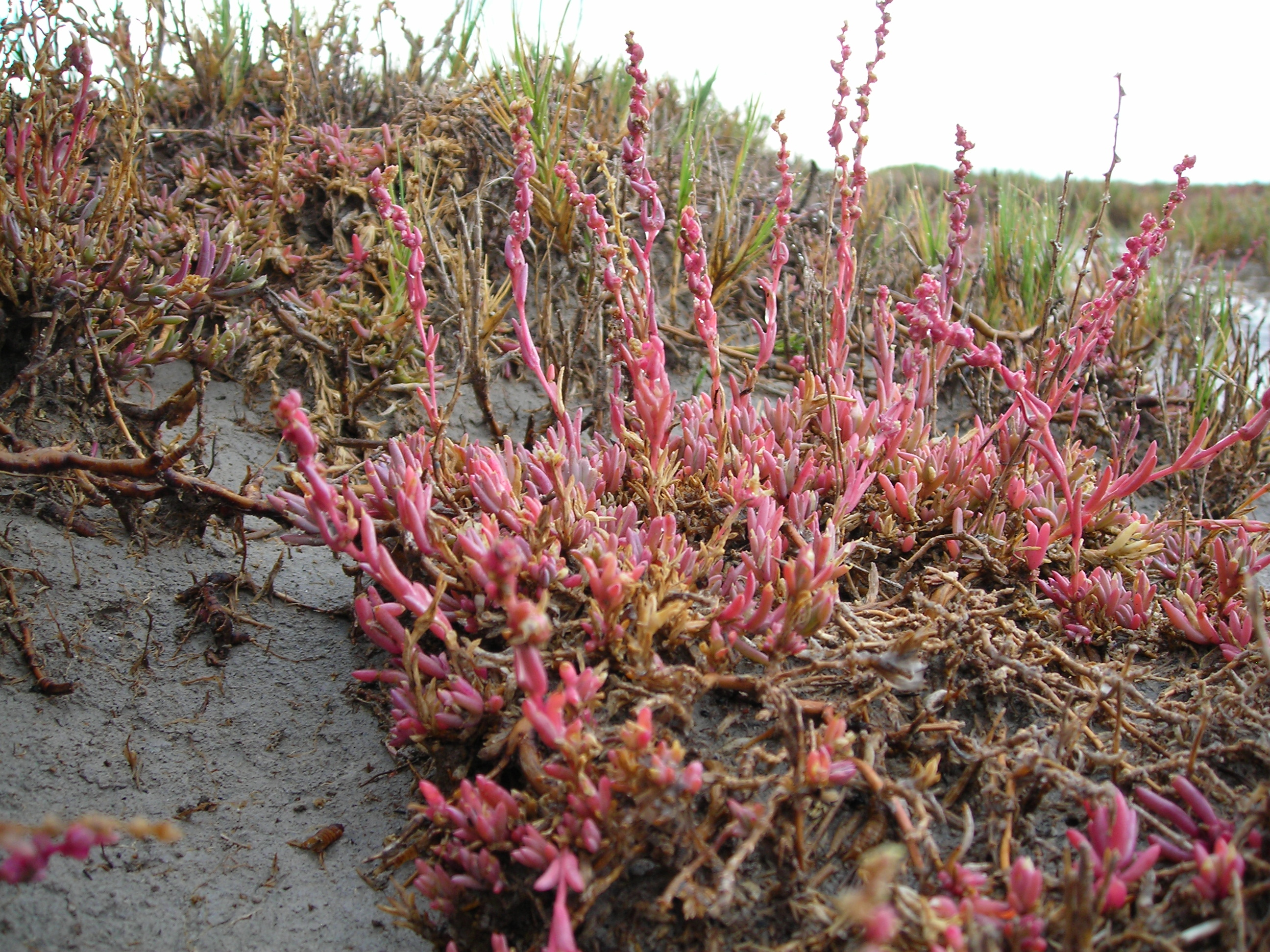

Scientific classification
- Kingdom: Plantae
- Clade: Tracheophytes
- Clade: Angiosperms
- Clade: Eudicots
- Order: Caryophyllales
- Family: Amaranthaceae
- Genus: Suaeda
- Species: S. pulvinata

Binomial name
- Suaeda pulvinata Alvarado Reyes & Flores Olv.

= Suaeda pulvinata =

Species of flowering plant

Suaeda pulvinata is an endemic seepweed from Mexico. It lives in the shores of Lake Texcoco and Lake Totolcingo. It lives underwater as an aquatic plant for half of the year and on dry land as a terrestrial plant for the other half due to the changing levels of the lakes that it inhabits. It is a perennial flat herbaceous herb with prostrate stems. Its leaves and inflorescences are green to reddish in color.

This species is important for people that live in the states of Puebla and Tlaxcala, as it is an edible vegetable. The dish that is prepared using this species is known as romeritos.

It has been found in molecular phylogenetic studies that this taxon is monophyletic. Due to differences in its phylogenetic position in its nuclear ITS tree and its chloroplast rpl32-trnL tree, it is thought this species is the result of hybridization of ancestral species of Suaeda.

The first scientific collector who found this plant was Efraim Hernández Xolocotzi. (Later, it was cited by Guadalupe Ramos in her university degree thesis.) However, he misidentified it for S. nigra. It was in 2013 that Ernesto Alvarado Reyes and Hilda Flores Olvera noticed it was a different species.
