= Kalawy Bay =

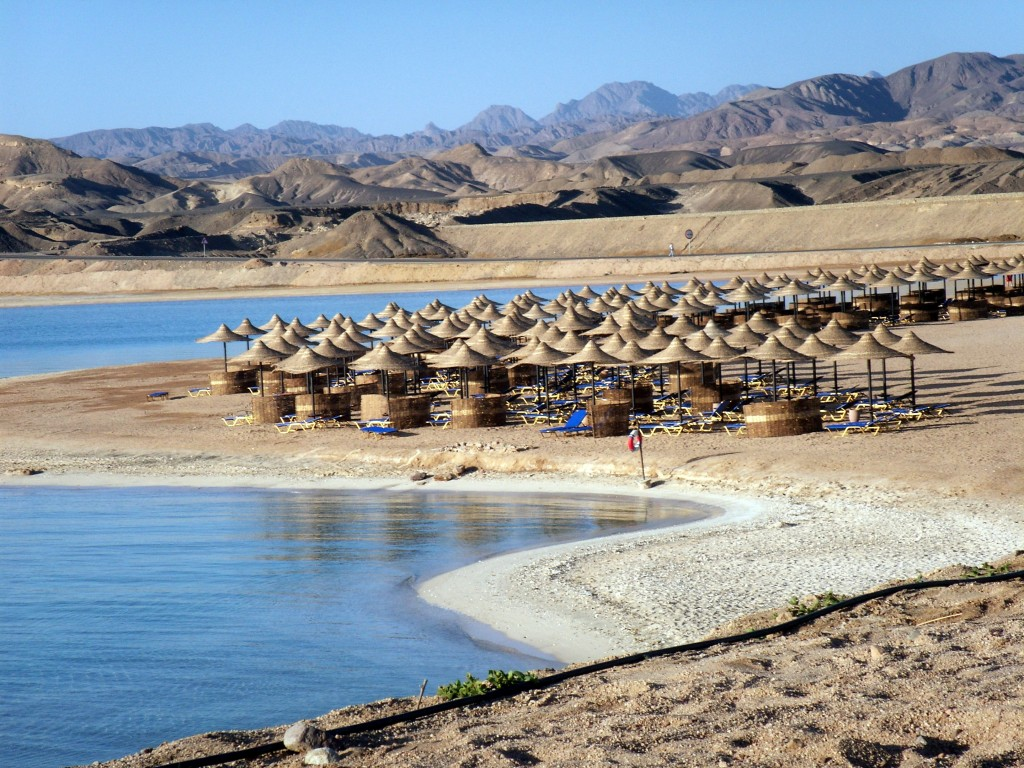

- Location in Egypt
- Coordinates: 26°30′N 34°04′E
- Country: Egypt
- Region: Eastern Desert
- Governorate: Red Sea Governorate
- Time zone: UTC+2 (EET)
  - Summer (DST): UTC+3 (EEST)

Kalawy Bay is a resort on the Red Sea in the Red Sea Governorate of southeastern Egypt. The Eastern Desert region of the Sahara begins behind the resort on the west.

== Resort ==
Kalawy Bay is a newly built and tourist dominated holiday village located in a small bay of the same name on the Red Sea. The settlement consists of a hotel complex, located 32 kilometers south of Safaga. A short distance in front of the beach are some of the smaller reefs of the sea.

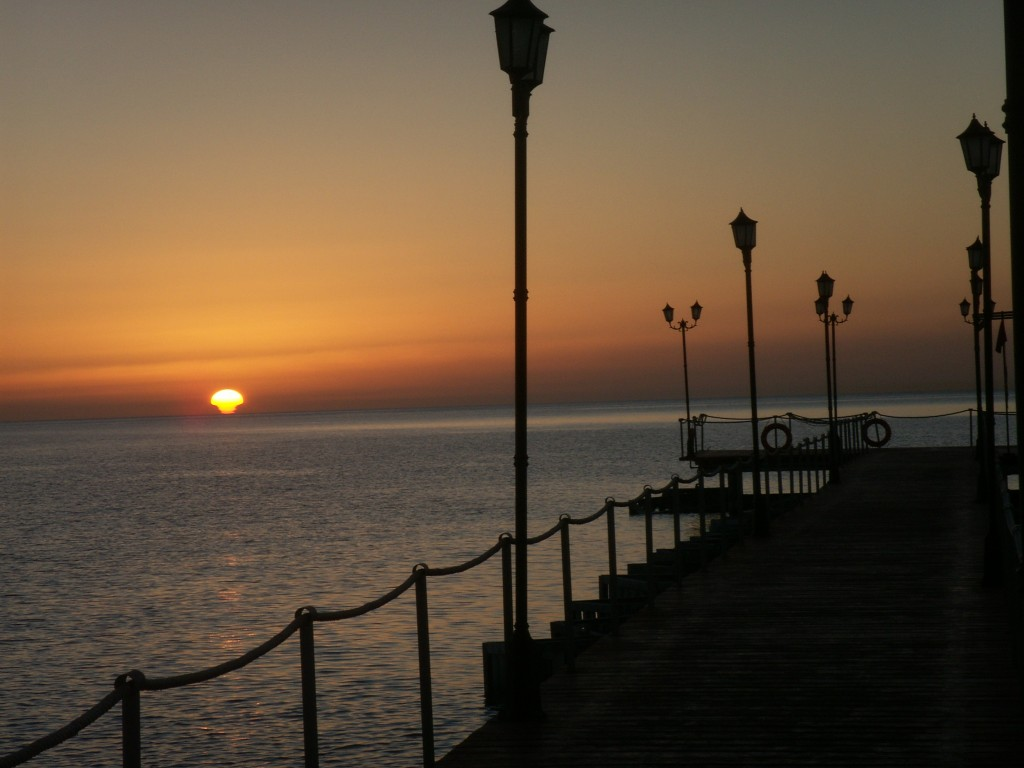
Kalawy Bay

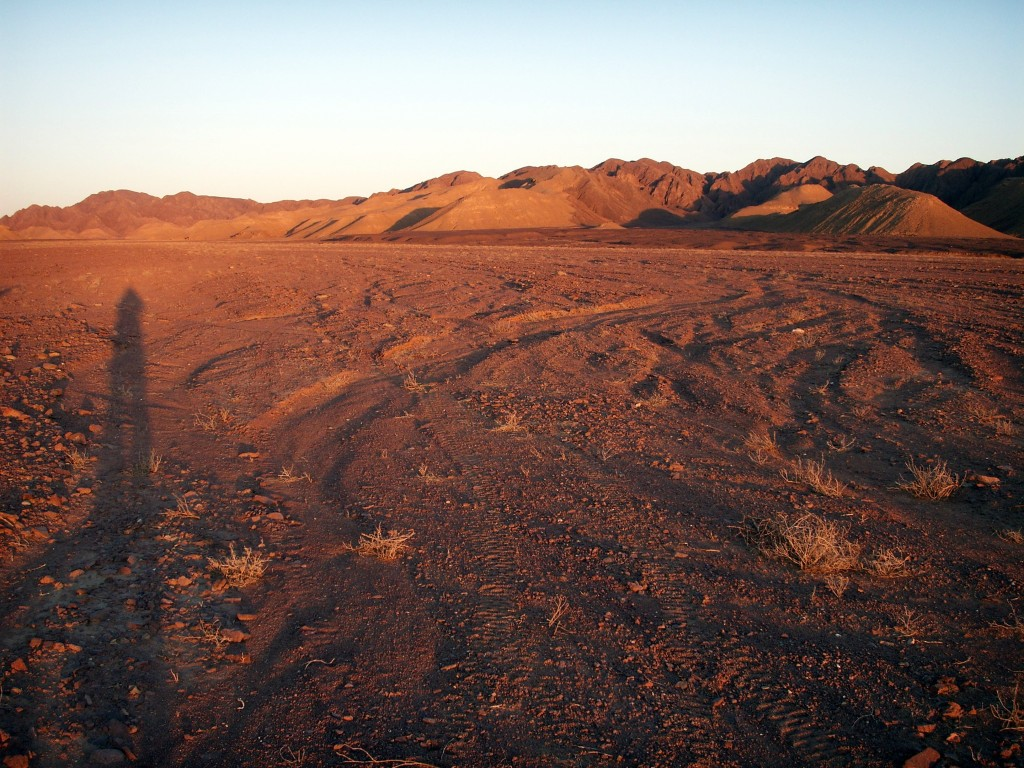
Eastern Desert near Kalawy Bay.

== See also ==
- Eastern Desert
