= Wadi Dib ring complex =

Geological structure in the Eastern Desert of Egypt

Wadi Dib Ring Formation
- Type: Geological formation

Location
- Coordinates: 27°34′41″N 32°56′32″E
- Region: Eastern Desert
- Country: Egypt

The Wadi Dib ring complex in the Eastern Desert of Egypt is a circular geological structure visible from space. It is the result of an upwelling of magma that solidified into a series of different rock types, each rock type having a distinct color. It has a diameter of 2 kilometres (1.2 mi).
