= Coleophora pechi =

Scientific classification
- Kingdom: Animalia
- Phylum: Arthropoda
- Class: Insecta
- Order: Lepidoptera
- Family: Coleophoridae
- Genus: Coleophora
- Species: C. pechi

Binomial name
- Coleophora pechi Baker, 1888

Synonyms
- Coleophora subcastanea Walsingham, 1907; Coleophora lepigreella Lucas, 1933

Species of moth

Coleophora pechi is a moth of the family Coleophoridae that is endemic to Algeria.

The larvae feed on Suaeda vermiculata. They feed within stem galls on their host plant.
