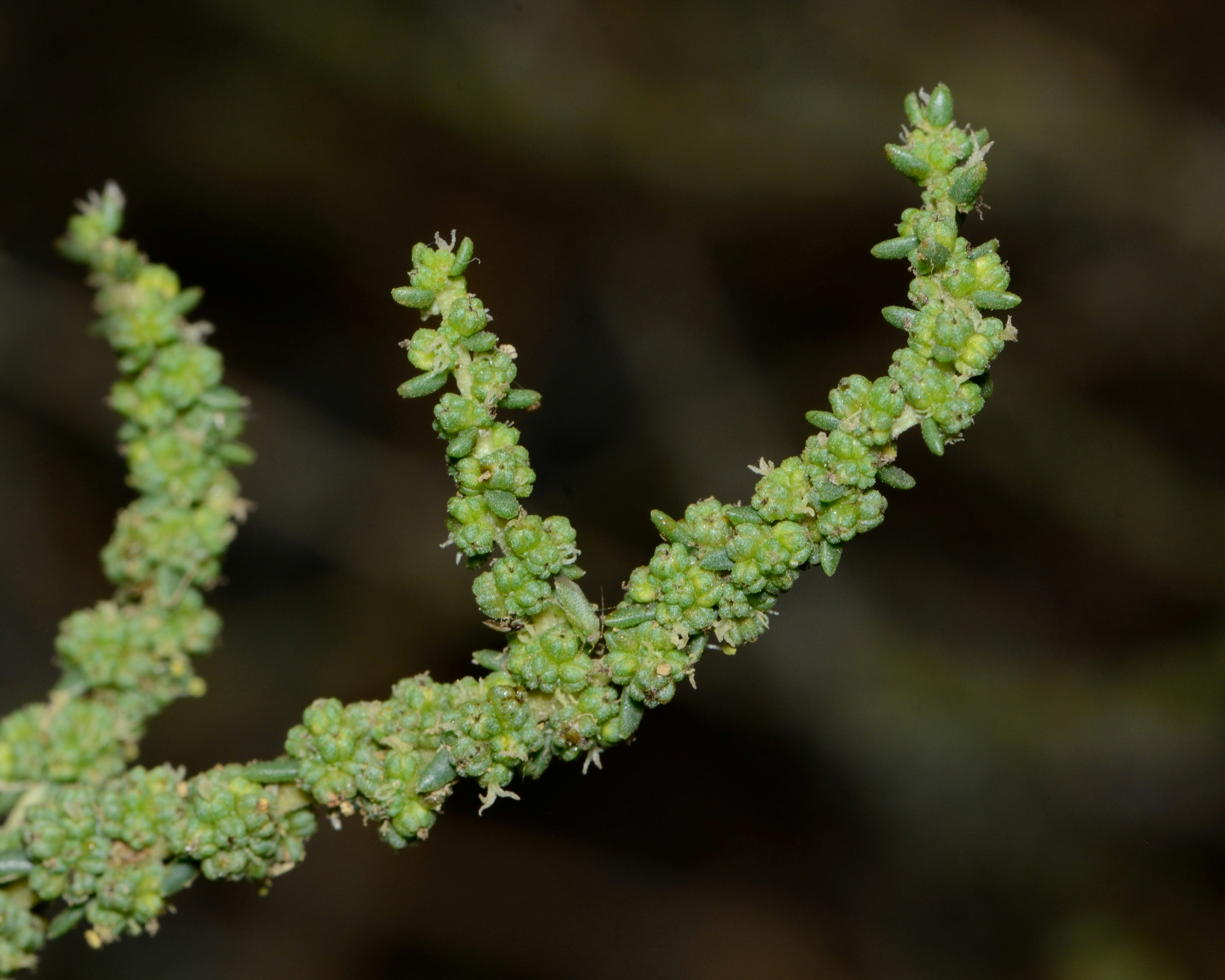

Scientific classification
- Kingdom: Plantae
- Clade: Tracheophytes
- Clade: Angiosperms
- Clade: Eudicots
- Order: Caryophyllales
- Family: Amaranthaceae
- Genus: Suaeda
- Species: S. fruticosa

Binomial name
- Suaeda fruticosa Forssk. ex J.F.Gmel.

= Suaeda fruticosa =

Species of plant

Suaeda fruticosa is a species of flowering plant in the family Amaranthaceae (formerly placed in the family Chenopodiaceae). It is a small shrub, with very variable appearance over its wide range. It is a halophyte, and occurs in arid and semi-arid saltflats, salt marshes and similar habitats.

== Description ==
Suaeda fruticosa is a low shrub growing to a height of about 1 to 2 m (3 to 7 ft). It is extremely variable throughout its wide range in height, growth habit, colouring, internode length, leaf shape, and the size and orientation of inflorescences and fruits. It is usually a rounded, much-branched bush but can be prostrate, climbing or straggling. It is densely-branched, the stems feeling very rough when the leaves are shed, pale green at first, becoming grey and fissured. The leaves are succulent, the smaller ones being long and narrow while the larger ones are elliptical. The flowers grow in clusters in the leaf axils. Some are bisexual, being drum-shaped and up to 1.5 mm (0.06 in) wide, with five succulent tepals fused to a third of their length. Others are entirely female, rather smaller with non-succulent tepals, fused for half their length, persistent and partly concealing the fruit. There are three stigmas. The perianth enlarges in the bisexual fruits but remains unchanged in the female fruits. Reproduction is mainly by seed, which are black and shining, slightly flattened, globular or drop-shaped. It has a chromosome number of 2n=36.

== Taxonomy ==
The species has a complicated taxonomic history, and other species have been called S. fruticosa for a very long time. Two later homonyms of Suaeda fruticosa Forssk. ex J.F.Gmel. exist:

- Suaeda fruticosa (L.) Delile is a synonym of Suaeda vera Forssk. ex J.F.Gmel..
- Suaeda fruticosa Hook. & Arn. is a synonym of Suaeda nigra (Raf.) J.F.Macbr.

In Europe, what was formerly called S. fruticosa is now known to be S. vera, whereas in Africa what was formerly identified as S. fruticosa is now thought to be either S. vera or S. vermiculata. The 'real' S. fruticosa Forssk. ex J.F.Gmel. occurs from the Arabian Peninsula and the Middle East eastwards to the Indian subcontinent, however, here it has in some cases been misidentified as S. vermiculata. In Israel all three species may occur (or not), elsewhere S. fruticosa does not appear to occur in the same countries as the other two species.

The name S. fruticosa has furthermore also been misapplied in North America to plants of the species S. nigra.

== Distribution ==
It occurs in the Arabian peninsula, Iran, Afghanistan and the Indian sub-continent.

== Ecology ==
It is a common and widespread species growing on sometimes-flooded alluvial land, drier areas, coastal regions, salt flats and salt marshes on soils that are sandy and soils that have a lot of clay.

This plant is common in the saltlands of the Indian sub-continent, and is one of the dominant plants in the Tamarix/Salvadora/Suaeda climax vegetation. Other associated plants include Zygophyllum simplex, Cressa cretica, Caroxylon imbricatum, Salsola stocksii, Aeluropus lagopoides and Sporobolus helvolus. The few trees and shrubs growing in these saline habitats include Salvadora persica, Salvadora oleoides, Tamarix dioica and Capparis decidua.

== Uses ==
It is one of a number of plants high in sodium known as barilla which were used to make soda ash for use in the soap and glass industries. Large quantities were exported from India in the 18th and 19th centuries, and S. fruticosa and various chenopods, are still collected from the seasonal salt marshes in the Rann of Kutch for local use in the manufacture of soap and baking soda. It also provides forage for camels.

The seeds could be a potential source of edible oils which are rich in unsaturated fatty acids. The plant is an obligate halophyte and can be used to reduce the salinity of soils.
