= Suaeda albescens =

Scientific classification
- Kingdom: Plantae
- Clade: Tracheophytes
- Clade: Angiosperms
- Clade: Eudicots
- Order: Caryophyllales
- Family: Amaranthaceae
- Genus: Suaeda
- Species: S. albescens

Binomial name
- Suaeda albescens Lázaro Ibiza

Species of flowering plant

Suaeda albescens is a species of flowering plant in the family Amaranthaceae. It is a prostrate shrub native to Spain and Portugal.
