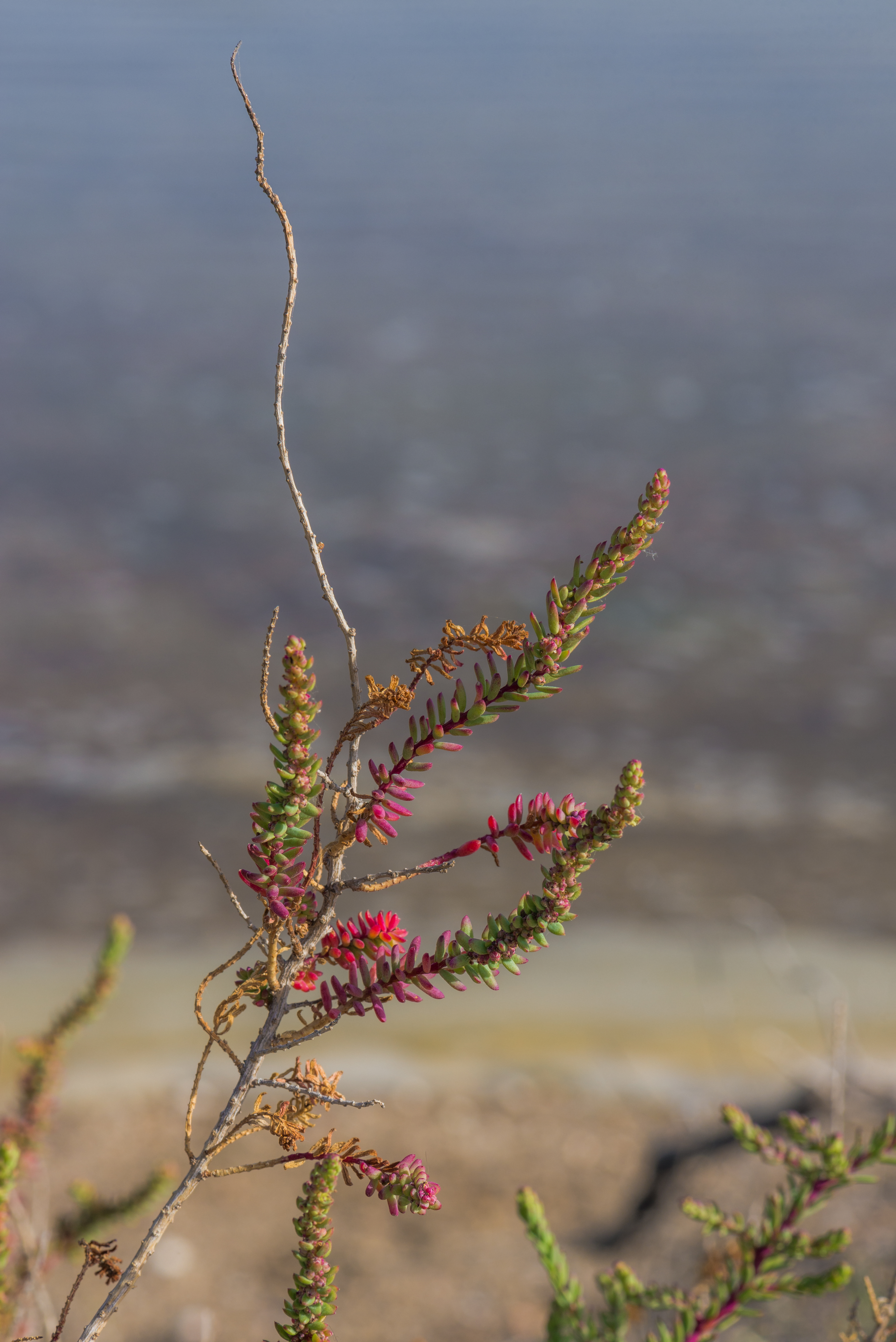

Scientific classification
- Kingdom: Plantae
- Clade: Tracheophytes
- Clade: Angiosperms
- Clade: Eudicots
- Order: Caryophyllales
- Family: Amaranthaceae
- Genus: Suaeda
- Species: S. vera

Binomial name
- Suaeda vera Forssk. ex J.F.Gmel.

= Suaeda vera =

Species of flowering plant in the amaranth family

Suaeda vera, also known as shrubby sea-blite, shrubby seablight or in the US sometimes as alkali seepweed, is a species of flowering plant in the family Amaranthaceae (formerly classified under the Chenopodiaceae). It is a small shrub, with very variable appearance over its wide range. It is a halophyte, and occurs in arid and semi-arid saltflats, salt marshes and similar habitats.

== Taxonomy ==
This species was first described according to the modern Linnaean system of taxonomy by Linnaeus himself in 1753, who called the species Chenopodium fruticosum. A student of his, Peter Forsskål, joined an expedition undertaking a scientific exploration of Egypt, Saudi Arabia, Yemen and further in 1760. Only one explorer survived the journey, but Forsskål's journal and notes made it safely back to Copenhagen, and in 1775 his new data was summarised by the last remaining member of the expedition. Forsskål named a number of Suaeda species from the region, including S. vera, S. vermiculata and S. fruticosa, but the 1775 work was not validly published and therefore the names nomima invalida. In 1776 Forsskål's new genus Suaeda was validated by Johann Friedrich Gmelin, and in 1791 Gmelin validated the species. However, what Forsskål called S. vera was the same as Linnaeus's Chenopodium fruticosum, whereas what Forsskål called S. fruticosa was a species that does not occur in Europe, the Near East or North Africa. Nonetheless, the identities were switched, such that S. fruticosa, with the incorrect authority attribution (L.) Forssk. was and still is commonly used across the region, although the switched identity was discovered in the mid-20th century.

William Forsyth Jr. translated Gmelin's 1791 thirteenth edition of the Systema Naturae into English as A Botanical nomenclator in 1794, but decided to move this species to Salsola vera in his translation, and gives Gmelin's 1776 work as the publication of the basionym, further confusing the issue.

Another name and taxon tangled up in this confusion is S. vermiculata. According to Petteri Uotila, writing for the EUR+MED flora project in 2011, this is a species which is only found in Europe in Spain and Sicily, and is otherwise distributed in Africa, four of the Canary Islands, and the Middle East. The African Plants Database agrees with Uotila that S. fruticosa does not occur in Africa, but states that the name was misapplied to populations of S. vermiculata in Africa, not to S. vera, while listing the same works. The Database does agree that S. vera occurs in the Maghreb, and also gives S. fruticosa as a synonym, but S. fruticosa under a different authority attribution!

G. Tutin's Flora Europaea (last edition in 1993) uses the name S. fruticosa for this taxon.

=== Britain ===
The British botanist Clive A. Stace uses the name S. fruticosa for this species in his New Flora of the British Isles. This usage was also found in the 1958 List of British Vascular Plants by James Edgar Dandy, but in 1969 Dandy corrected the nomenclature to S. vera. Other British authorities use the name S. vera.

=== Iraq and Israel ===
The 2016 Flora of Iraq accepts S. fruticosa and S. vermiculata in the flora of Iraq, but not S. vera. One of the only botanical authorities to recognise all three taxa within the country are Avinoam Danin and Ori Fragman-Sapir in Israel. According to them, all three taxa are valid species and each has a different habitat, with S. vera occurring along the Mediterranean coast and in the highlands of the central Negev Desert, S. fruticosa occurring around the shores of the Dead Sea, and with S. vermiculata in the valley of Arabah. A further complication is that according to the Suaeda specialist Helmut Freitag in the 2001 Flora of Pakistan, the S. vermiculata in the 1966 Flora Palestina by Daniel Zohary is misidentified, and is actually S. fruticosa.

=== Spain and Portugal ===
The name Suaeda vera was itself misapplied to a collection of S. vermiculata, which was reported in error in Portugal. In the 1990 volume of the Flora Ibérica, only S. vera was stated to occur in Spain, not S. vermiculata or S. fruticosa. The EUR+MED flora project has both S. vera and S. vermiculata occurring in Spain, but not S. fruticosa.

== Description ==
It has a chromosome number of 2n=36.

== Distribution ==
The range of this species is primarily along the coasts of the Mediterranean region. In Europe the range extends northwards along the Atlantic coasts of Spain, Portugal, France to south-eastern England. It does not extend around the Black Sea.

Because of the taxonomic confusion, the distribution in Africa is somewhat more complicated. It occurs in the Canary Islands, the Maghreb countries of northern Africa, and likely into the Sahel countries of Sudan and Mauritania, but it is unclear if the populations further in southern Africa, formerly classified as Suaeda fruticosa, belong to S. vera or S. vermiculata. For example, the 1988 Atlas Florae Europaeae, which is based on an older edition of the Flora Europaea, includes Cape Verde for S. fruticosa, which this population is not, but it is not clear to which taxon it actually belongs.

In Asia it appears that this species is limited to around the Mediterranean region in the Levant and along the coasts of southern Anatolia. It does not extend eastwards into Iraq or Pakistan, here the real S. fruticosa occurs. A similar situation seems to exist on the Arabian Peninsula.

== Ecology ==
Seeds germinate more readily in fresh than in salt water. In Britain it is a coastal species found particularly where shingle and salt marsh meet.

== Uses ==
It is one of a number of plants high in sodium known as 'barilla' which were used to make soda ash for use in the soap and glass industries. Large quantities were exported from North Africa in the 18th and 19th centuries. In a trial in Tunisia it has been found possible to grow both Suaeda and the cordgrass Spartina alterniflora using seawater to irrigate them and increase yields, but only when additional nitrogen and phosphorus are added. The high salt content of the plants will be likely to limit their use as stand alone forage crops, it being more likely they will be used as components of a feed mix.
