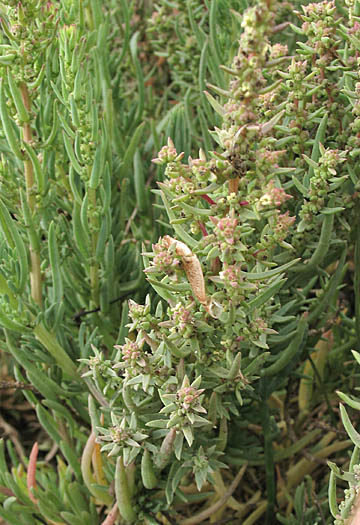

Scientific classification
- Kingdom: Plantae
- Clade: Tracheophytes
- Clade: Angiosperms
- Clade: Eudicots
- Order: Caryophyllales
- Family: Amaranthaceae
- Genus: Suaeda
- Species: S. esteroa

Binomial name
- Suaeda esteroa Ferren & Whitmore

= Suaeda esteroa =

Species of aquatic plant

Suaeda esteroa is a species of flowering plant in the family Amaranthaceae known by the common name estuary seablite. It is a yellow-green to reddish subshrub with fleshy, succulent leaves. It is native to the estuaries and salt marshes of coastal southern California and Baja California.
