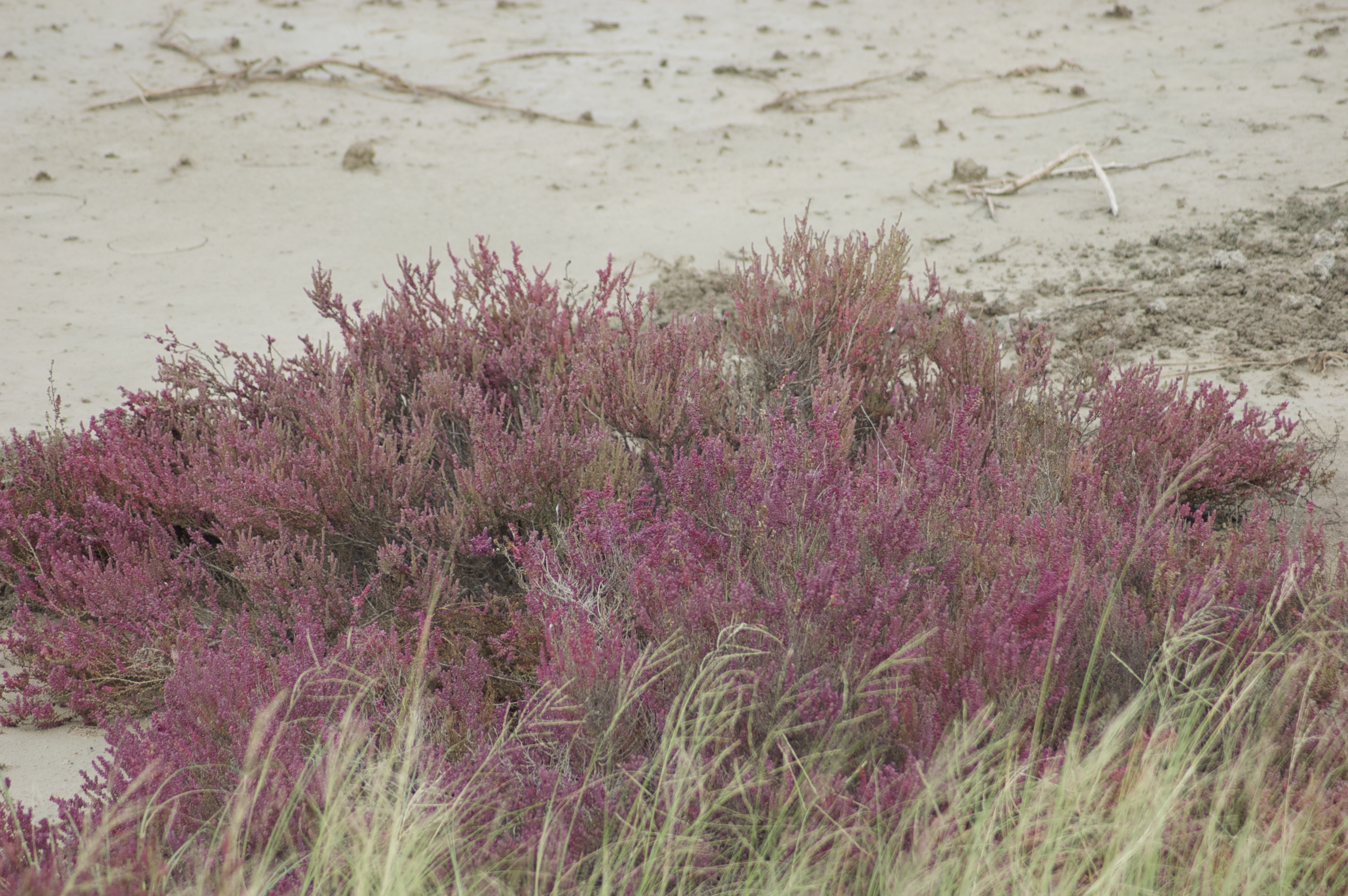

Conservation status
- Least Concern (IUCN 3.1)

Scientific classification
- Kingdom: Plantae
- Clade: Tracheophytes
- Clade: Angiosperms
- Clade: Eudicots
- Order: Caryophyllales
- Family: Amaranthaceae
- Genus: Suaeda
- Species: S. salina

Binomial name
- Suaeda salina B.Nord.

= Suaeda salina =

Species of flowering plant

Suaeda salina is a species of plant in the family Amaranthaceae. It is endemic to Namibia. Its natural habitat is cold desert.
