= Suaeda aralocaspica =

Scientific classification
- Kingdom: Plantae
- Clade: Tracheophytes
- Clade: Angiosperms
- Clade: Eudicots
- Order: Caryophyllales
- Family: Amaranthaceae
- Genus: Suaeda
- Species: S. aralocaspica

Binomial name
- Suaeda aralocaspica (Bunge) Freitag & Schütze

Synonyms
- Borszczowia aralocaspica Bunge

Species of flowering plant

Suaeda aralocaspica is a species of plant in the family Amaranthaceae that is restricted to the deserts of Central Asia. It is a halophyte and uses C_{4} carbon fixation but lacks the characteristic leaf anatomy of other C_{4} plants (known as kranz anatomy). Carrying out complete C_{4} photosynthesis within individual cells, these plants instead are known as single‐cell C4 system or SCC_{4} plants. This makes them distinct from typical C_{4} plants, which require the collaboration of two types of photosynthetic cells. SCC_{4} plants have features that make them potentially valuable in engineering higher photosynthetic efficiencies in agriculturally important C_{3} carbon fixation species such as rice. To address this, the 467 Mb genome of S. aralocaspica has been sequenced to help understanding of the evolution of SCC_{4} photosynthesis and contribute to the engineering of C_{4} photosynthesis into other economically important crops.

It is monoecious, annual and grows to a height of between 20 and 50 cm (7.9–19.7 in). It flowers in August, producing seeds of two different sizes that differ in their morphology, dormancy and germination characteristics.

The species was formerly classified in its own genus Borszczowia, which is now treated as section within genus Suaeda.
