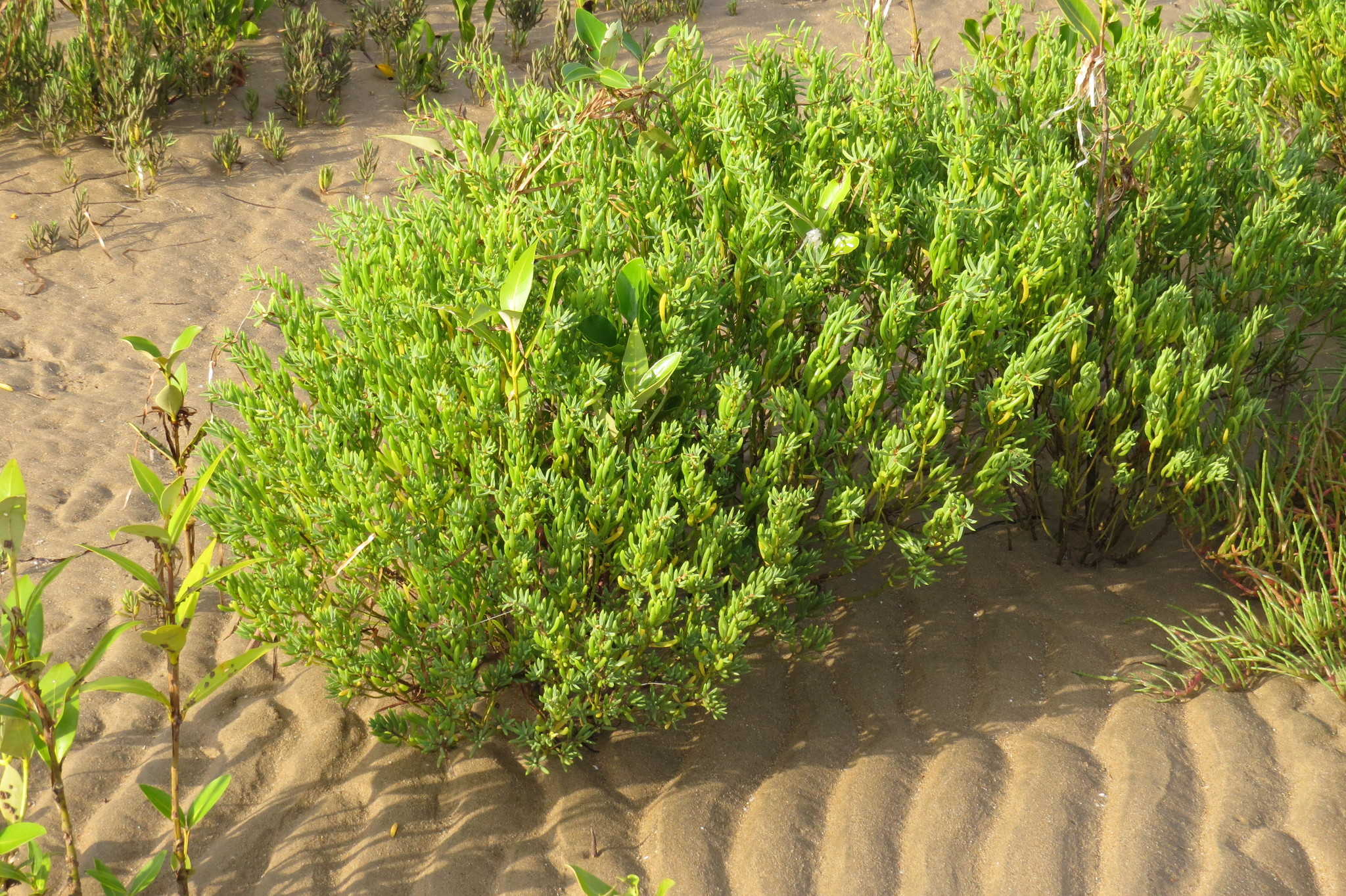

Conservation status
- Least Concern (NCA)

Scientific classification
- Kingdom: Plantae
- Clade: Embryophytes
- Clade: Tracheophytes
- Clade: Spermatophytes
- Clade: Angiosperms
- Clade: Eudicots
- Order: Caryophyllales
- Family: Amaranthaceae
- Genus: Suaeda
- Species: S. arbusculoides

Binomial name
- Suaeda arbusculoides L.S.Sm.

= Suaeda arbusculoides =

Species of flowering plant

Suaeda arbusculoides is a species of plant in the family Amaranthaceae native to northern Australia. It is a decumbent shrub up to 1 m (3 ft 3 in) in height with succulent leaves about 20 mm (0.8 in) long, 4 mm (0.16 in) wide and 3 mm (0.12 in) thick. It grows in tidal flats in mangrove communities from Moreton Bay in southeast Queensland, north and west along the coastlines all the way to Carnarvon in Western Australia.

== Conservation ==
This species is listed as least concern under the Queensland Government's Nature Conservation Act, and in Western Australia it has been classed as "not threatened". As of 11 July 2026, it has not been assessed by the International Union for Conservation of Nature.
