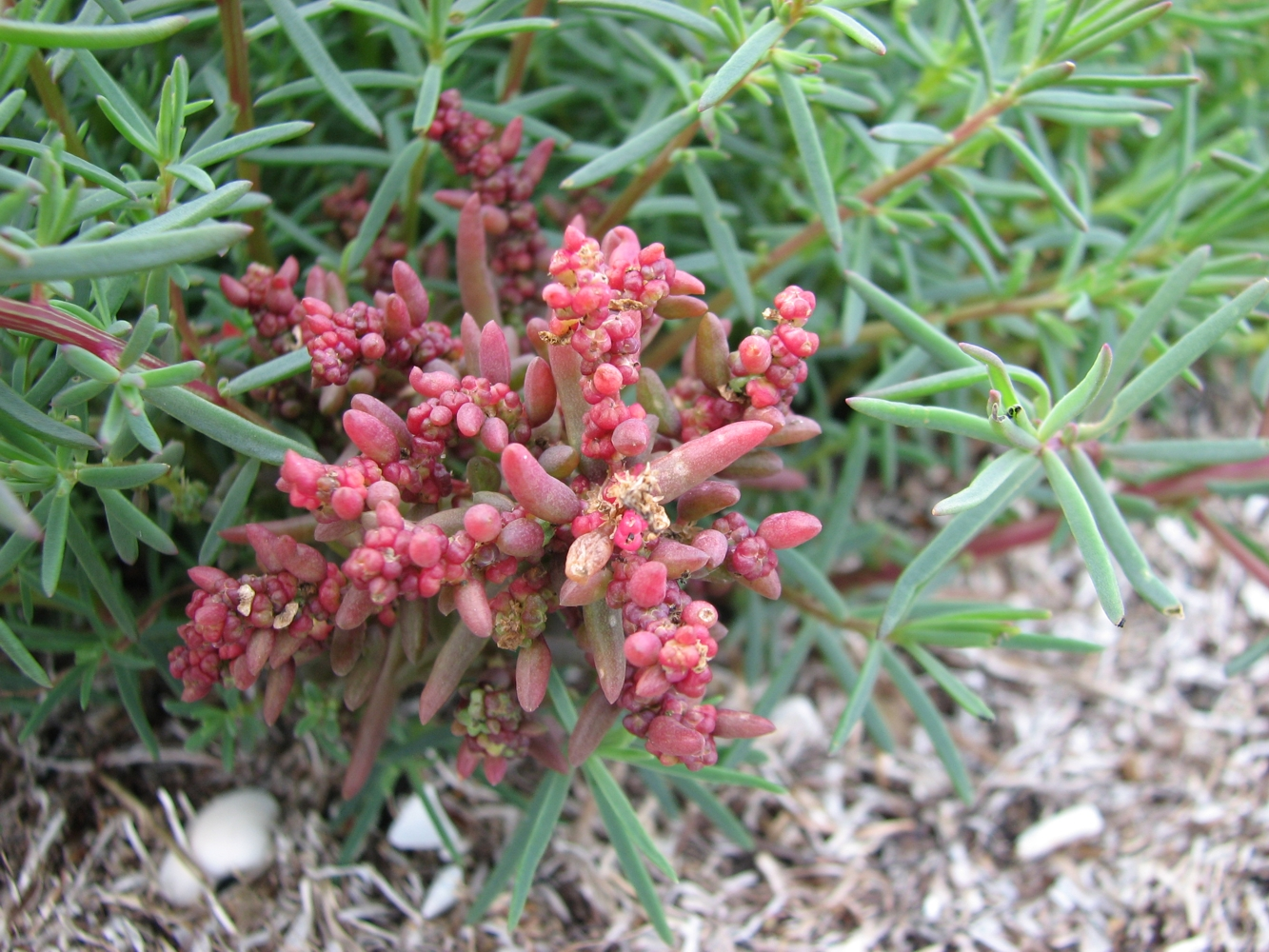

Scientific classification
- Kingdom: Plantae
- Clade: Tracheophytes
- Clade: Angiosperms
- Clade: Eudicots
- Order: Caryophyllales
- Family: Amaranthaceae
- Genus: Suaeda
- Species: S. australis

Binomial name
- Suaeda australis (R.Br.) Moq.

Synonyms
- Chenopodium australe R.Br.; Chenopodium insulare J.M.Black; Chenopodina australis (R.Br.) Moq.; Lerchia maritima var. australis (R.Br.) Kuntze; Schoberia australis (R.Br.) Steud.; Suaeda maritima var. australis (R.Br.) Domin

= Suaeda australis =

Species of plant

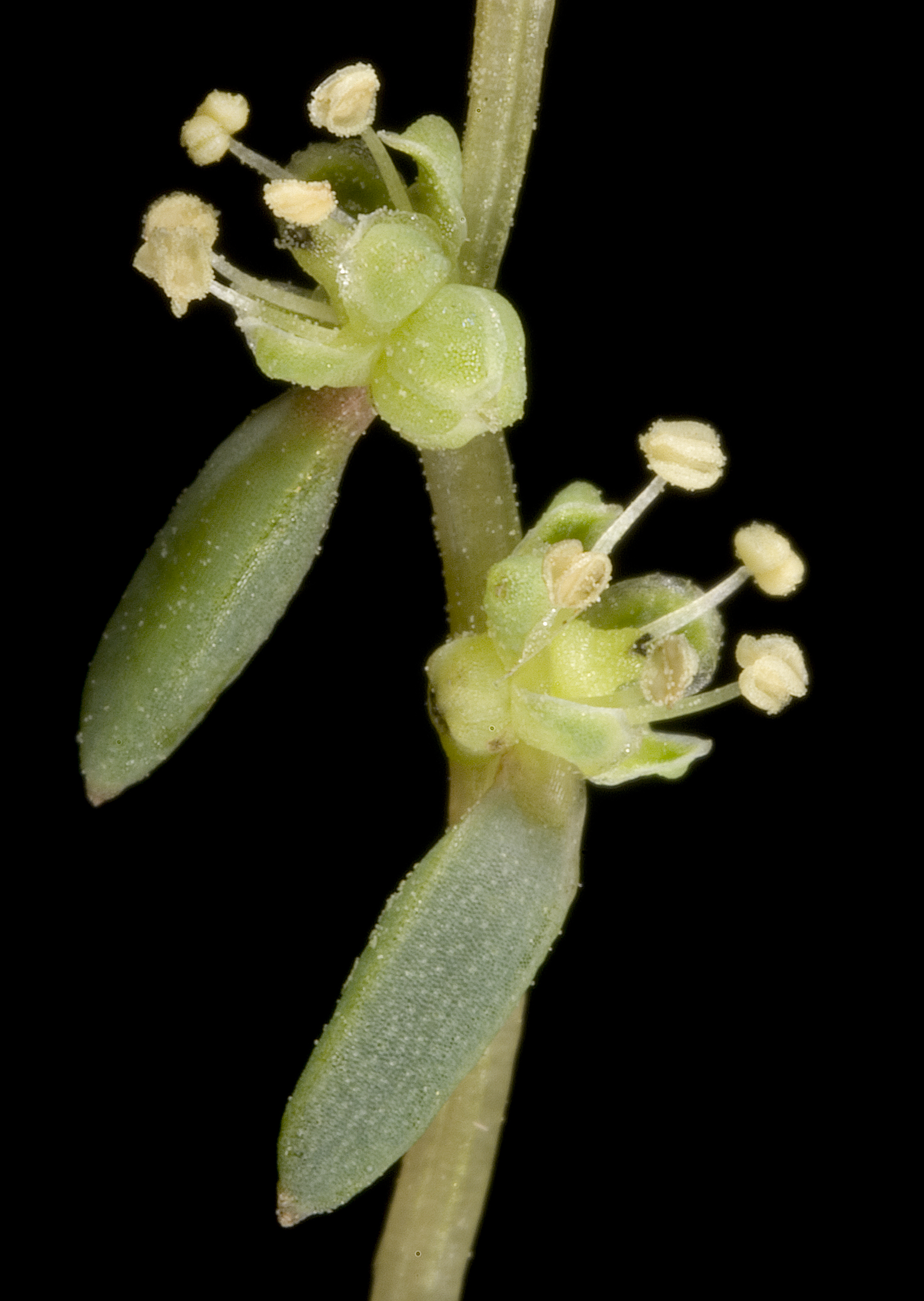
Suaeda australis

Suaeda australis, the austral seablite, is a species of plant in the family Amaranthaceae, native to Australia.It was first described in 1810 by Robert Brown as Chenopodium australe. In 1831 Alfred Moquin-Tandon transferred it to the genus, Suaeda, to give its present name.

== Description ==
It grows to 10 to 90 cm (4 to 35 in) in height, with a spreading habit and branching occurring from the base. The leaves are up to 40 mm in length and are succulent, linear and flattened. They are light green to purplish-red in colour.

The species occurs on shorelines in coastal or estuarine areas or in salt marshes. It is native across Australia including the states of Queensland, New South Wales, Victoria, Tasmania, South Australia and the south-west of Western Australia.

In irrigated areas, the species is known as a salinity indicator plant and is referred to as redweed.
