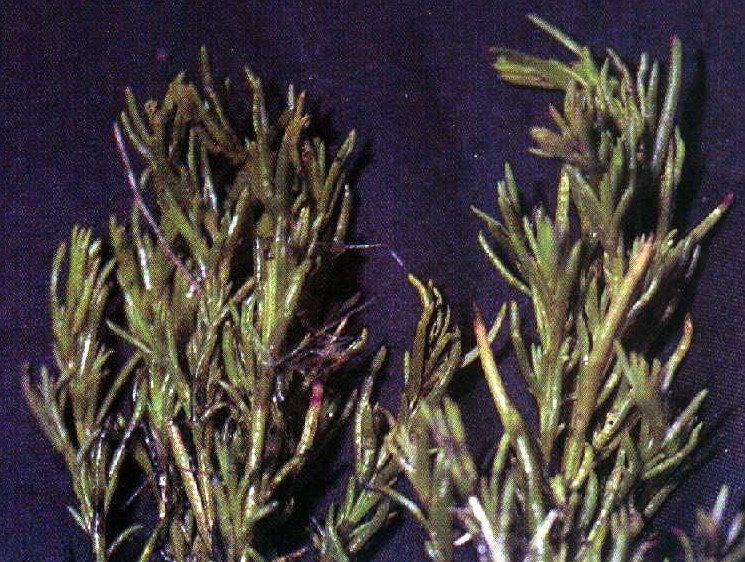

Conservation status
- Secure (NatureServe)

Scientific classification
- Kingdom: Plantae
- Clade: Tracheophytes
- Clade: Angiosperms
- Clade: Eudicots
- Order: Caryophyllales
- Family: Amaranthaceae
- Genus: Suaeda
- Species: S. calceoliformis

Binomial name
- Suaeda calceoliformis (Hook.) Moq.

Synonyms
- Suaeda americana; S. depressa; S. minutiflora

= Suaeda calceoliformis =

Species of flowering plant

Suaeda calceoliformis is a species of flowering plant in the family Amaranthaceae known by several common names, including the Pursh seepweed and horned seablite.

== Distribution ==
The plant is native to North America, where it can be found across most of the continent except for parts of the Southeastern United States. It is a halophyte, growing in areas of high soil salinity and alkalinity, such as playas, salt flats, beaches, marshes, and other wetlands, and the edges of roads that are salted in the winter.

== Description ==
Suaeda calceoliformis is an annual herb with waxy green to red or striped, bicolored stems growing up to 80 centimeters long. It may grow erect to prostrate in shape, the prostrate forms being more common in higher salinity substrates because they can retain more water. The fleshy, waxy leaves are up to 4 centimeters long, linear in shape, and lie nearly against the stem instead of spreading away from it.

The inflorescence is an elongated cyme of flowers shaped like a branching spike. It is dense with many tight clusters of flowers with leaflike bracts growing between them. There are three to five flowers per cluster, each with a calyx of horned sepals and no petals.

The fruit is an utricle that grows within the calyx.
