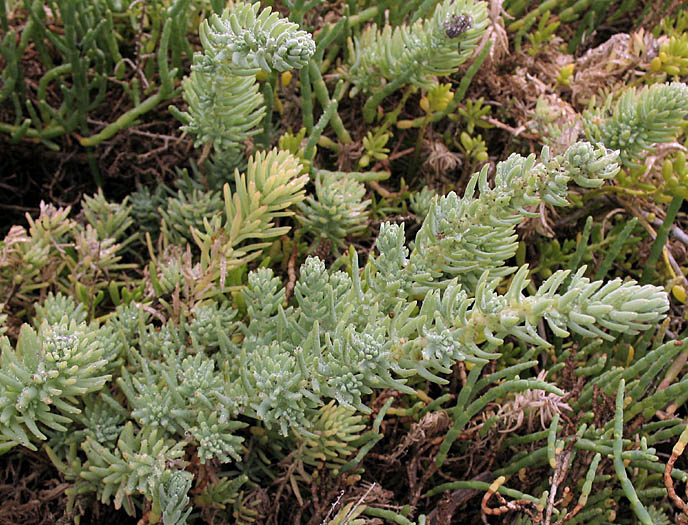

Scientific classification
- Kingdom: Plantae
- Clade: Tracheophytes
- Clade: Angiosperms
- Clade: Eudicots
- Order: Caryophyllales
- Family: Amaranthaceae
- Genus: Suaeda
- Species: S. taxifolia

Binomial name
- Suaeda taxifolia Standl.

= Suaeda taxifolia =

Species of aquatic plant

Suaeda taxifolia is a species of flowering plant in the family Amaranthaceae known by the common name woolly seablite.

It is native to the coastline of southern California and Baja California, where it grows in saline habitat such as salt marshes, beaches, dunes, and scrub. It is quite variable in appearance.

== Description ==
Suaeda taxifolia is a generally a shrub or subshrub spreading or growing erect to a maximum height near 1.5 metres (4.9 ft). It is hairless to densely hairy, and waxy in texture. It has woody lower stems and fleshy green to reddish upper stems.

The succulent leaves are lance-shaped to nearly oval, measuring up to 3 centimeters in length. They vary in color from bluish to green to yellowish or reddish. There is usually a knobby bump at the base of each.

Flowers occur in clusters along the stems, each cluster containing 1 to 3 flowers. Leaflike bracts accompany the clusters. The flower has no petals and is composed of a calyx of fleshy, rounded, hairy sepals.

The fruit is an utricle that grows within the calyx.
