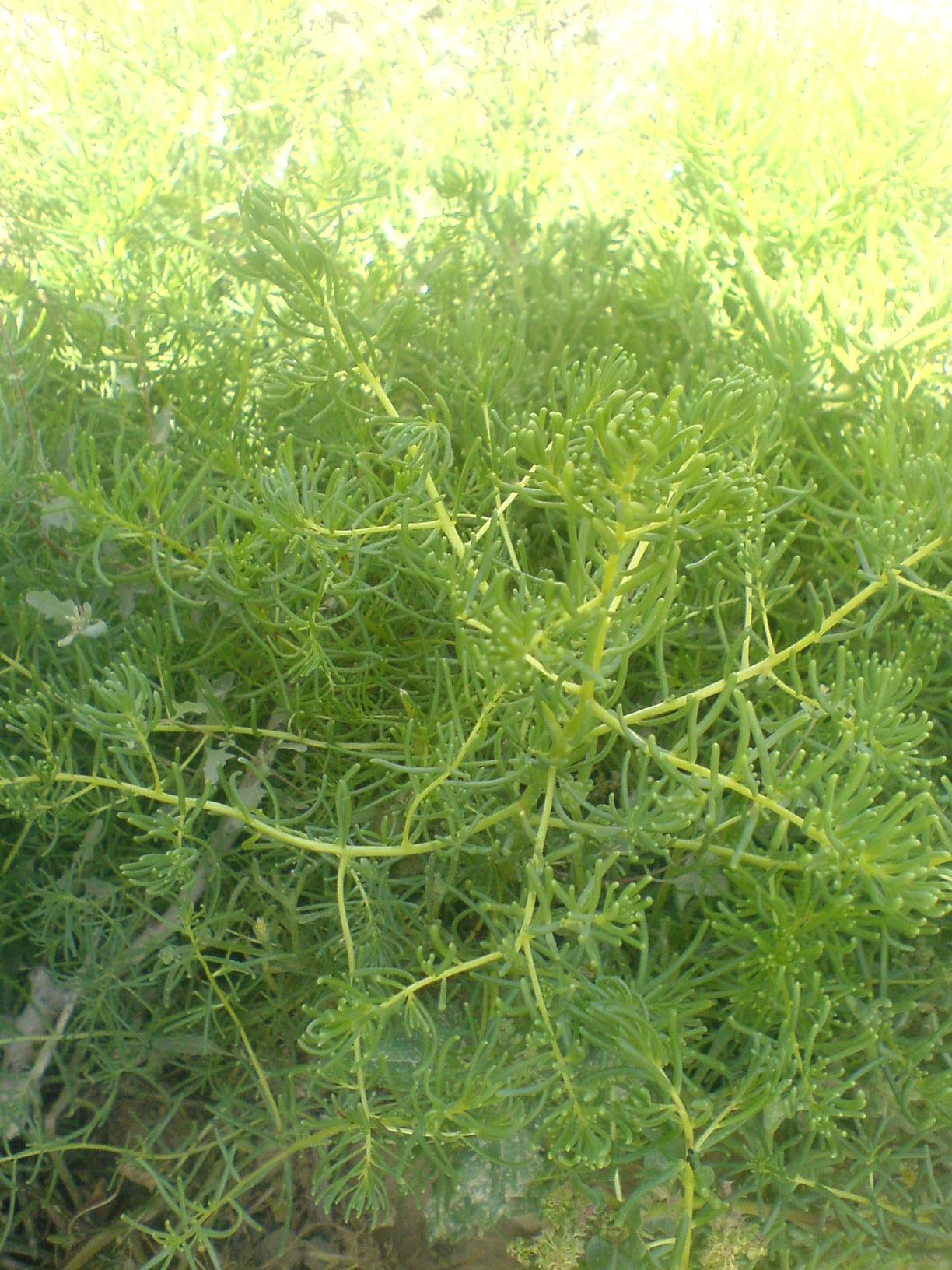
- Suaeda aegyptiaca in south of Iran

Scientific classification
- Kingdom: Plantae
- Clade: Tracheophytes
- Clade: Angiosperms
- Clade: Eudicots
- Order: Caryophyllales
- Family: Amaranthaceae
- Genus: Suaeda
- Species: S. aegyptiaca

Binomial name
- Suaeda aegyptiaca (Hasselq.) Zohary

Synonyms
- Chenopodium aegyptiacum Hasselq.; Chenopodium hortense (Forssk. ex J.F.Gmel.) Schult.; Enchylaena aegyptiaca (Hasselq.) Spreng.; Lerchia baccata (Forssk. ex J.F.Gmel.) Kuntze; Lerchia hortensis (Forssk. ex J.F.Gmel.) Kuntze; Salsola baccata (Forssk. ex J.F.Gmel.) Poir.; Salsola divergens Poir.; Salsola hortensis (Forssk. ex J.F.Gmel.) Forsyth f.; Salsola suaeda Forsyth f.; Schanginia aegyptiaca (Hasselq.) Aellen; Schanginia baccata (Forssk. ex J.F.Gmel.) Moq.; Schanginia hortensis (Forssk. ex J.F.Gmel.) Moq.; Schanginia linifolia Moq.; Schoberia hortensis (Forssk. ex J.F.Gmel.) Steud.; Suaeda baccata Forssk. ex J.F.Gmel.; Suaeda cavifolia Hausskn. ex Bornm. & Gauba; Suaeda hortensis Forssk. ex J.F.Gmel.; Suaeda maris-mortui Post; Suaeda platyphylla Ehrenb. ex Boiss.

= Suaeda aegyptiaca =

Species of plant

Suaeda aegyptiaca is a species of succulent plant in the family Amaranthaceae (formerly classified under the Chenopodiaceae), and salt-tolerant (halophyte) plant that is distributed in eastern North Africa, the Near East and West Asia.

Local vernacular names for this plant in Qatar are juliman, guluman, ikhreet or hamd.

== Taxonomy ==
The species was first described under the basionym Chenopodium aegyptiacum in 1757 by Fredrik Hasselqvist, an early Swedish scientific explorer of the Levant and Arabia, and a student of Linnaeus. Hasselqvist collected the holotype in Alexandria, Egypt, although the Suaeda specialist Helmut Freitag stated in 1989 that it is probably lost.

Although it has bounced around between genera over the centuries, at present the taxon is considered to belong within the genus Suaeda. It was moved to the genus Suaeda by the well-known Israeli botanist Daniel Zohary in 1957, also sometimes incorrectly said to be 1955.

Although the Plants of the World Online website and the Flora Somalia consider S. hortensis a synonym of S. aegyptiaca, in Israel, Avinoam Danin and Ori Fragman-Sapir regard both taxa as legitimate, differentiated species, although S. hortensis has only been recorded three times in the territory.

== Description ==
=== Habitus ===
This plant is a glaucous, usually prostrate, dwarf shrub or herb from 10 cm up to 70 cm in height, exceptionally up to 125 cm. A bush can be 5 to 30 cm in diameter, exceptionally up to 100 cm. It is said to usually tinted deep pink all over in Africa, although in the Flora of Pakistan it is said to be light green to fresh green in colour during normal vigorous growth, but under conditions of stress it often becomes yellowish. Dried specimens become pale green, and never dry to a brown or blackish colour. The Flora Somalia states that plants from the Red Sea coast with bright green leaves, which dry a pale green colour, possibly represent a distinct taxon.

This species is extremely variable in shape, the stems can be erect, ascending or decumbent. It is an annual, perhaps in some rare cases a short-lived perennial. The numerous, highly branched stems are glabrous, succulent, often becoming somewhat woody at the base of the main stem. This base can become up to 5 cm thick, exceptionally up to 10 cm. The young stems are completely coloured a pale green, later becoming whitish to cream-coloured, and are terete or delicately striate in cross-section. The larger branches at the top of the bush are often erect or ascending, whereas the lower branches are more prostrate on the ground. The stems end in a bracteate inflorescence, this is also variable in form: it can be either loose or densely flowered, and the floral spike can be either short or long. The very ends of the inflorescences are often flexuose.

This species uses a C4 carbon fixation pathway in its photosynthesis.

=== Leaves ===
Its very succulent, subterete or terete leaves are (7-)10 to 17(-20)mm long and 1 to 2.5mm thick. The lower leaves are linear to oblong or fusiform in shape, are not curved, and end in a sharp point. The upper leaves are narrowly obovate to clavate in shape, arched upwards to outwards, with a blunt end, and their bases attenuating into a short petiole. There are progressively less leaves produced along flowering stems. The leaves have a watery internal tissue.

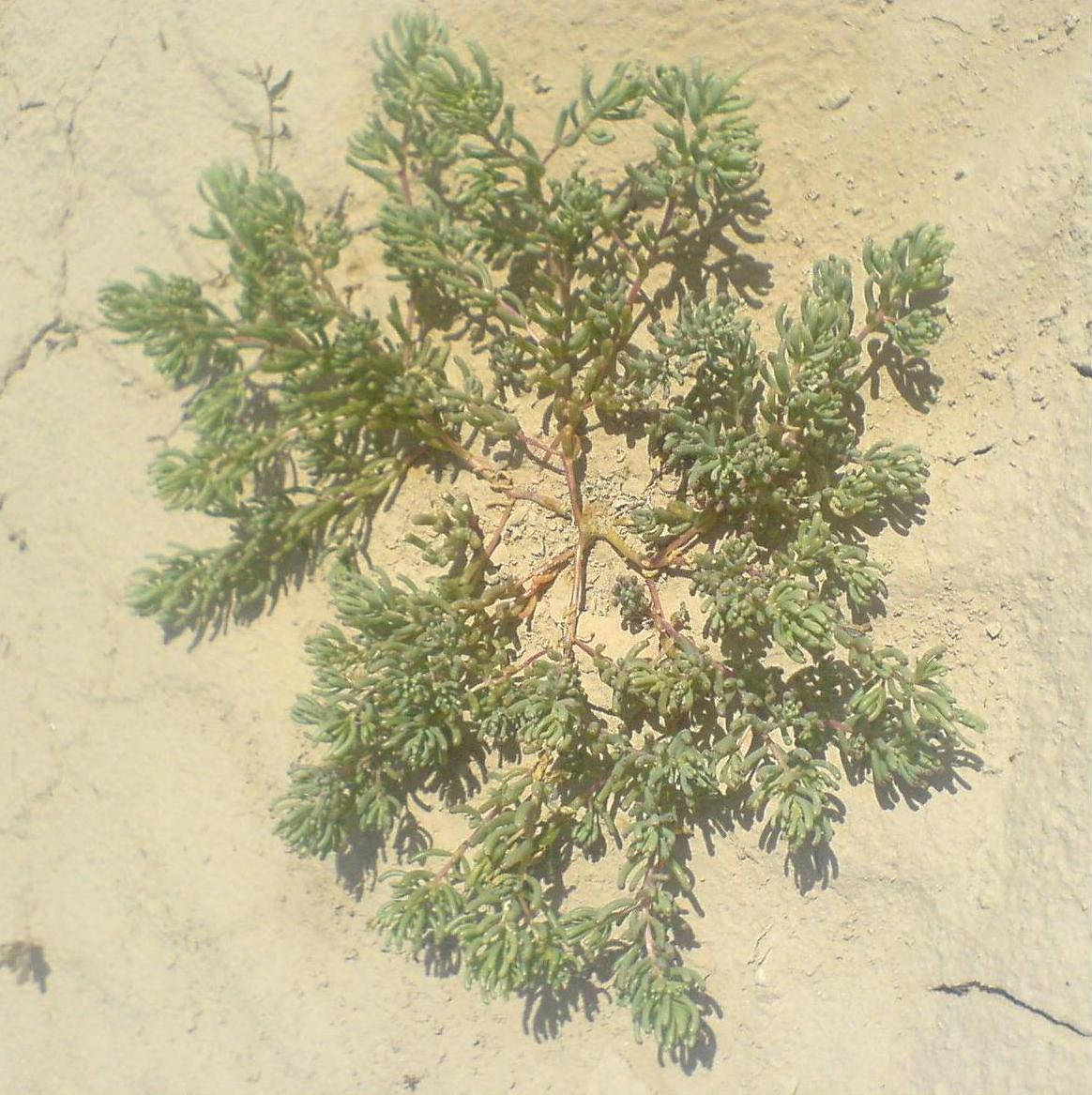
Suaeda aegyptiaca in South of Iran

=== Flowers ===
The bracts in the inflorescence can be subclavate to clavate, and are arched towards the stem but spread outwards. The lower bracts are much longer than the upper bracts. The upper bracts are as long as or shorter than the clusters of flowers or fruit they subtend. The bracteoles are 0.8 to 1mm in length, narrowly ovate, trullate or triangular in shape, and have an acute or acuminate tip, and lacerated to toothed margins.

The flowers can be either bisexual (perfect) or female. A rare solitary flower may occur, but the flowers are almost always grouped into dense clusters of 5 to 30 flowers, known as glomerules. These glomerules are usually simply found between the leaf and the stem, but are sometimes found fused to the very base of the petiole of the subtending bract, and are often inserted on very short axillary branches. The glomerules may sometimes form contiguous to somewhat interrupted spikes.

The tepals are very succulent, and fused together for 1/2 to 2/3 of their lower length. The free lobes of the tepals are also very succulent, curve inwards, are coloured green with hyaline margins, and somewhat cucullate. Thus the lowermost 1mm part of the flower forms a compact cone, and higher up this cone widens out into a bowl-like structure.

The perfect flowers have five stamens, are weakly protandrous, fig-shaped, about 2 to 2.5 in length, 2.5 to 3mm in diameter, have a deeply divided perianth, and are somewhat round-shaped. The stamens have thread-like filaments are connected to a rim formed on the base of the tepals (epitepalous), after anthesis the filaments elongate up to 1.5mm in length. The anthers are 0.6 to 0.7mm long by 0.5mm wide, and are divided for about half of their length. The semi-inferior, sharply tapered ovary is not attached to anything for part of its length, or is described as fused with the perianth on its lower, ovule-bearing part, with the upper part forming a slender column or cone, approximately 1mm in length. The three (rarely two or four) stigmas are filiform, and are 0.7 to 1.2mm in length, but can exceptionally be 1.5 to 2mm long. The stigmas have long papillae, and are connected to the centre of the collar or cone-like apex of the ovary.

In the smaller female flowers there are minute staminode-like appendages, the ovary is more or less entirely connected to the perianth, and there are three or four styles.

=== Fruit ===
As the pollinated flowers develop into fruit, the perianth base swells and somewhat enlarges up to 3mm long, and the upper part of the ovary swells and becomes partly or completely spongy. Sometimes the fruits which are derived from bisexual flowers have a slight basal constriction in the ovary swelling. The fruits are fig-shaped. The seeds are vertically placed within the fruit. The glossy, black or blackish seeds are 0.9 to 1.2mm in length, 0.75 to 1mm in width, 0.6 to 0.75mm thick, and orbicular to ovoid, and only slightly compressed or flattened, in shape, with a short beak. The testa of the seed coat has a smooth to delicately sculptured surface texture. The Flora Somalia states that the plants around the Red Sea develop a much more spongy perianth during fruiting, have oblique-shaped seeds, and with the base of the style not being conspicuously enlarged may belong to a different or new species.

== Distribution ==
Its main occurrence is in the Near Eastern countries east of the Mediterranean Sea, from northern Libya eastwards to Iraq, the southern half of Iran, southern Afghanistan, to Pakistani Baluchistan, and southwards to the Arabian Peninsula, Yemen and the Dhofar region of Oman. Around the Mediterranean it occurs in Libya, Egypt (including the Sinai), Israel, Jordan and Syria, perhaps also Lebanon. It occurs in Qatar and in the United Arab Emirates. It is particularly common in salt-affected regions of southern Iran.

There is a single specimen sheet in the Naturalis herbarium determined as this species which was said to be collected in Ethiopia. There are likewise two specimens collected in the estuary of the Jubba River in Somalia, of which at least one was said to unequivocally belong to this species in the early 1990s. Plants in Djibouti and further along the Red Sea coast were identified as this species, but are a different colour and have different fruit, and may belong to another species. Neither Djibouti nor Somalia are recognised as part of the range in the African Plants Database. This source, as well as Freitag in 2001, state it is native to Cyprus, but this is not recognised in the 2011 treatment in the EUR+MED flora project. The plant has also appeared in parts of southern Australia where it may have naturalized. Freitag states it occurs in northern Sudan, but this is not corroborated by the African Plants Database.

== Ecology ==
In Africa it grows at low altitudes near sea level, in a habitat of coastal bushland dominated by dwarf shrubs and Suaeda species in general. In Pakistan it has been recorded from sea level to 1,000 meters in altitude, exceptionally 1,800 meters. The species prefers usually saline areas which become temporarily flooded and then dry. It is a species which prefers somewhat to heavy disturbance to the environment, whether natural or anthropogenic. In Pakistan it has been found to grow in rather different plant communities and has been seen in various types of salt-marshes, along ditches and even sometimes as a weed in irrigated gardens and agricultural fields. It flowers in Pakistan from September to October.
