= Suaeda monoica =

Scientific classification
- Kingdom: Plantae
- Clade: Tracheophytes
- Clade: Angiosperms
- Clade: Eudicots
- Order: Caryophyllales
- Family: Amaranthaceae
- Genus: Suaeda
- Species: S. monoica

Binomial name
- Suaeda monoica Forssk. ex J.F.Gmel.

Synonyms
- List: Lerchia monoica (Forssk. ex J.F.Gmel.) Kuntze; Salsola lana Edgew.; Salsola monoica (Forssk. ex J.F.Gmel.) Forsyth f.; Schoberia monoica (Forssk. ex J.F.Gmel.) Steud.; Suaeda baluchestanica Akhani & Podlech; Suaeda nudiflora Thwaites; Suaeda vera subsp. brevifolia (Moq.) Castrov. & Cirujano

Species of flowering plant

Suaeda monoica is a species of flowering plant in the sea-blite genus Suaeda, largely native to the shores of the Indian Ocean from South Africa to Sri Lanka, and salty areas inland. It has been introduced in Argentina. It exhibits phenotypic plasticity, with leaves that are much more succulent when grown under higher salinity conditions. Its leaves are edible, and it is used as an animal fodder plant where it grows.
