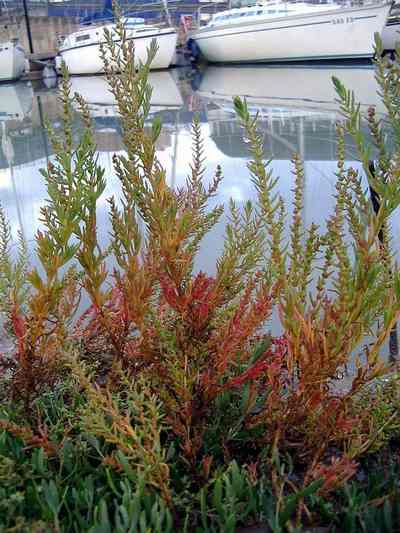
- Suaeda maritima

Scientific classification
- Kingdom: Plantae
- Clade: Embryophytes
- Clade: Tracheophytes
- Clade: Spermatophytes
- Clade: Angiosperms
- Clade: Eudicots
- Order: Caryophyllales
- Family: Amaranthaceae
- Subfamily: Suaedoideae
- Genus: Suaeda; Forssk. ex J.F. Gmel. (1776), nom. cons.

Species
- 94; see text

Synonyms
- Alexandra Bunge; Belowia Moq.; Borsczowia Bunge; Brezia Moq.); Calvelia Moq.; Chenopodina Moq.; Cochliospermum Lag.; Dondia Adans., nom. superfl.; Helicilla Moq.; Lerchia Haller ex Zinn, nom. rej.; Pterocalyx Schrenk; Schanginia C.A.Mey.; Schoberia C.A.Mey.; Trikalis Raf.

= Suaeda =

Genus of aquatic plants

Suaeda is a genus of plants also known as seepweeds and sea-blites. Most species are confined to saline or alkaline soil habitats, such as coastal salt-flats and tidal wetlands. Many species have thick, succulent leaves, a characteristic seen in various plant genera that thrive in salty habitats (halophile plants).

The most common species in northwestern Europe is S. maritima. It grows along the coasts, especially in saltmarsh areas, and is known in Britain as "common sea-blite", but as "herbaceous seepweed" in the US. It is also common along the east coast of North America from Virginia northward. One of its varieties is common in tropical Asia on the land-side edge of mangrove tidal swamps. Another variety of this polymorphic species is common in tidal zones all around Australia (Suaeda maritima var. australis is also classed as S. australis). On the coasts of the Mediterranean Sea a common Suaeda species is S. vera. This is known as "shrubby sea-blite" in English. It grows taller and forms a bush.

The name Suaeda comes from an oral (non-literary) Arabic name for the Suaeda vera species transliterated as suaed, sawād or suēd, and it was assigned as the genus name by the 18th century taxonomist Peter Forsskål during his visit to the Red Sea area in the early 1760s. Forsskål's book, Flora Aegyptiaco-Arabica, published 1775, in Latin, declares Suæda as a newly created genus name, with the name taken from an Arabic name Suæd and presents the species members of the new genus.

The genus includes plants using either C_{3} or C_{4} carbon fixation. The latter pathway evolved independently three times in the genus and is now used by around 40 species. S. aralocaspica, classified in its own section Borszczowia, uses a particular type of C_{4} photosynthesis without the typical "Kranz" leaf anatomy.

== Uses ==
In the medieval and early post-medieval centuries suaeda was harvested and burned, and the ashes were processed as a source for sodium carbonate for use in glass-making; see glasswort.

In Mexico, some species such as Suaeda pulvinata, called romeritos, are cooked in a traditional festive dish called either revoltijo or romeritos. It is also eaten as wild greens (quelites), or as edible herbs grown as part of the crop-growing system called milpa.

== Species ==
As of July 2026, Plants of the World Online accepts the following 94 species. Division into sections per Kapralov & Akhani (2006).

=== Subgenus Brezia ===
- Suaeda australis (R.Br.) Moq. – Austral seablite
- Suaeda calceoliformis (Hook.) Moq. – Pursh seepweed, broom seepweed, horned seablite
- Suaeda corniculata (C.A.Mey.) Bunge
- Suaeda heterophylla (Kar. & Kir.) Bunge ex Boiss.
- Suaeda kossinskyi Iljin
- Suaeda maritima (L.) Dumont.
- Suaeda occidentalis (S.Watson) S.Watson – western seepweed
- Suaeda pannonica Beck
- Suaeda patagonica Speg.
- Suaeda prostrata Pall.
- Suaeda spicata (Willd.) Moq.
- Suaeda tschujensis Lomon. & Freitag

=== Subgenus Suaeda ===
==== Section Alexandra ====
- Suaeda lehmannii (Bunge) Kapralov, Akhani & Roalson

==== Section Borszczowia ====
- Suaeda aralocaspica (Bunge) Freitag & Schütze – formerly known as Borszczowia aralocaspica

==== Section Salsina ====
- Suaeda altissima (L.) Pall.
- Suaeda arcuata Bunge
- Suaeda aegyptiaca (Hasselq.) Zohary
- Suaeda articulata Aellen
- Suaeda asphaltica (Boiss.) Boiss. – Asphaltic seablite
- Suaeda dendroides (C.A.Mey.) Moq.
- Suaeda divaricata Moq.
- Suaeda foliosa Moq.
- Suaeda fruticosa Forssk. ex J.F.Gmel.
- Suaeda microphylla Pall.
- Suaeda monoica Forssk. ex J.F.Gmel.
- Suaeda taxifolia (Standl.) Standl. – woolly seablite
- Suaeda vermiculata Forssk. ex J.F.Gmel.

==== Section Schanginia ====
- Suaeda linifolia Pall.
- Suaeda paradoxa (Bunge) Bunge

==== Section Schoberia ====
- Suaeda acuminata (C.A.Mey.) Moq.
- Suaeda carnosissima Post
- Suaeda cucullata Aellen
- Suaeda eltonica Iljin
- Suaeda microsperma (C.A.Mey.) Fenzl
- Suaeda splendens (Pourr.) Gren. & Godr.

==== Section Suaeda ====
- Suaeda vera Forssk. ex J.F.Gmel.

==== Section Physophora ====
- Suaeda ifniensis Caball. ex Maire
- Suaeda palaestina Eig & Zohary
- Suaeda physophora Pall.

=== Unsorted ===
- Suaeda albescens Lázaro Ibeza
- Suaeda anatolica (Aellen) Sukhor.
- Suaeda arbusculoides L.S.Sm.
- Suaeda arctica Jurtzev & V.V.Petrovsky
- Suaeda argentinensis A.Soriano
- Suaeda arguinensis Maire
- Suaeda braun-blanquetii (Pedrol & Castrov.) Rivas Mart., Cantó & Sánchez Mata
- Suaeda caboverdeana Rivas Mart., Lousã, J.C.Costa & Maria C.Duarte
- Suaeda caespitosa Dod
- Suaeda californica S.Watson – California seablite
- Suaeda conferta (Small) I.M.Johnst. – beach seepweed
- Suaeda densiflora Giusti ex Brignone
- Suaeda edulis Flores Olv. & Noguez
- Suaeda esteroa Ferren & S.A.Whitmore – estuary seablite
- Suaeda × genesiana Pedrol & Castrov.
- Suaeda glauca (Bunge) Bunge
- Suaeda inflata Aellen
- Suaeda iranshahrii Akhani & Freitag
- Suaeda jacoensis I.M.Johnst.
- Suaeda japonica Makino
- Suaeda khalijefarsica Akhani
- Suaeda kocheri Guss. ex C.Brullo, Brullo & Giusso
- Suaeda kulundensis Lomon. & Freitag
- Suaeda linearis (Elliott) Moq. – annual seepweed, narrow-leaf seablite
- Suaeda malacosperma H.Hara
- Suaeda merxmuelleri Aellen
- Suaeda mexicana (Standl.) Standl. – Mexican seepweed
- Suaeda micromeris Brenan
- Suaeda monodiana Maire
- Suaeda moschata A.J.Scott
- Suaeda multiflora Phil.
- Suaeda nesophila I.M.Johnst.
- Suaeda neuquenensis M.A.Alonso, Contic. & Cerazo
- Suaeda nigra (Raf.) J.F.Macbr. – bush seepweed, romerillo
- Suaeda nigrescens I.M.Johnst.
- Suaeda novae-zelandiae Allan
- Suaeda nudiflora (Willd.) Moq.
- Suaeda olufsenii Paulsen
- Suaeda palmeri (Standl.) Standl.
- Suaeda pelagica Bartolo, Brullo & P.Pavone
- Suaeda plumosa Aellen
- Suaeda pruinosa Lange
- Suaeda pterantha (Kar. & Kir.) Bunge
- Suaeda puertopenascoa M.C.Watson & Ferren
- Suaeda pulvinata Alvarado Reyes & Flores Olv.
- Suaeda rigida H.W.Kung & G.L.Chu
- Suaeda rolandii Bassett & Crompton – Roland's seablite
- Suaeda salina B.Nord.
- Suaeda salsa (L.) Pall.
- Suaeda scabra Lomon.
- Suaeda sibirica Lomon. & Freitag
- Suaeda stellatiflora G.L.Chu
- Suaeda tampicensis (Standl.) Standl. – coastal seepweed
- Suaeda turgida G.L.Chu
- Suaeda turkestanica Litv.
- Suaeda tuvinica Lomon. & Freitag

== Phylogeny ==
Abbreviated view of Kapralov & Akhani (2006), figure 3 (see original article for species-level phylogeny). Maximum likelihood, combined complete ITS, atpB-rbcL, and psbB-psbH.

- Suaedeae
  - - subg. Suaeda
      - - - - sect. Schoberia (C4)
            - sect. Alexandra (C3)
          - sect. Physophora (C3)
        - sect. Salsina (C4)
      - - - sect. Schanginia (C3)
          - sect. Borszczowia (C4)
        - sect. Suaeda (C3)
    - subg. Brezia (C3)
  - Bienertia (C4)
- Salicornioideae
