= Eastern Desert =

Sahara Desert east of the Nile River

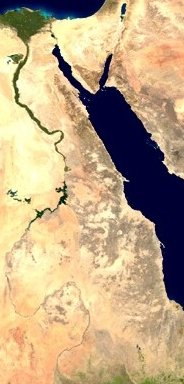
- The Nile River and the Eastern Desert

Geography
- Area: 223,000 km^{2} (86,000 mi^{2})
- Countries: Egypt; Eritrea; Ethiopia; Sudan
- Coordinates: 27°18′N 32°36′E
- Oceans or seas: Red Sea (eastern border)
- Rivers: Nile River (western border)
- Climate type: Arid

The Eastern Desert (known archaically as Arabia or the Arabian Desert) is the part of the Sahara Desert that is located east of the Nile River. It spans 223,000 square kilometres (86,000 sq mi) of northeastern Africa and is bordered by the Gulf of Suez and the Red Sea to the east, and the Nile River to the west. It extends through Egypt, Eritrea, Ethiopia, and the Sudan. The Eastern Desert consists of a mountain range which runs parallel to the coast (known as the Red Sea Hills), wide sedimentary plateaus extending from either side of the mountains and the Red Sea coast. The rainfall, climate, vegetation and animal life sustained in the desert varies between these different regions. The Eastern Desert has been a mining site for building materials, as well as precious and semi-precious metals, throughout history. It has historically contained many trade routes leading to and from the Red Sea, including the Suez Canal.

== Geography ==
=== Historical formation ===
Between 100 and 35 million years ago the area that is now the Eastern Desert was underwater, covered by the Tethys Ocean. During the Oligocene period, around 34 million years ago, the land began to tilt and the coastline was pushed back to the north and west. Concurrently, the basement complex to the east was uplifted, forming the mountain range of the Desert. In this same sequence of land movements, a rift which is now the Red Sea was opened up.

=== Mountains ===
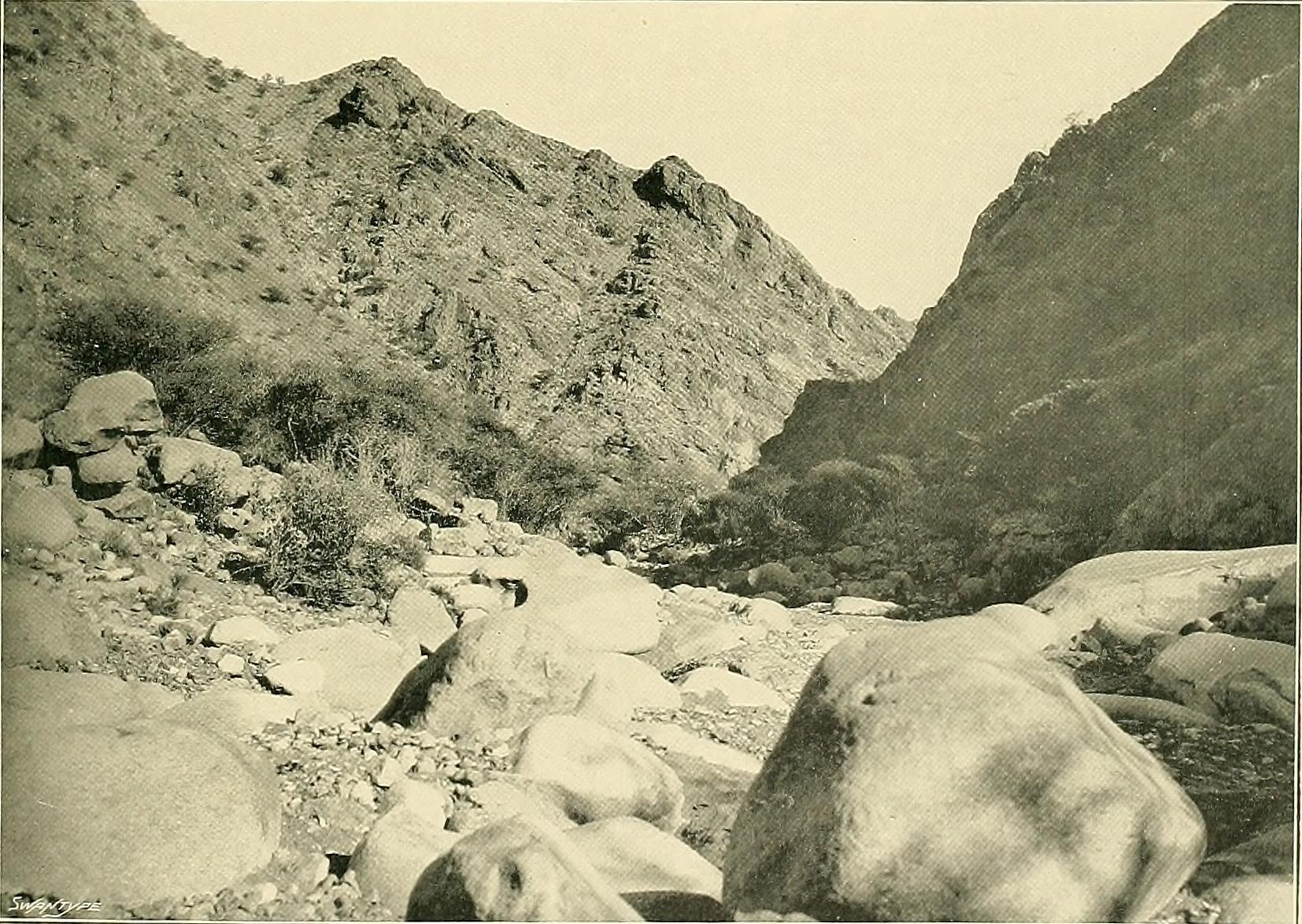
Wadi in the Eastern Desert

The mountain range of the Eastern Desert runs between 80 and 137 kilometres (50 and 85 mi) inland from and parallel to the Red Sea Coast. It has peaks around 1,500 metres (4,900 ft) above sea level. The southern mountains are predominantly composed of igneous rock while the mountains to the north are composed of limestone. Separating the mountains are wide wadis which allow for the runoff of rainfall from the mountains to the Red Sea and the Nile River. The mountain range's highest peak is Gabal Sha'ib El Banat at 2,184 metres (7,165 ft) above sea level. Other significant peaks include Jebel Erba (2,217 metres (7,274 ft)) Jabal Oda (2,160 metres (7,090 ft)), Jabal Shaib al Banat (2,087 metres (6,847 ft)), Jebel Hamata (1,961 metres (6,434 ft)), Gebel Amm Anad (1,782 metres (5,846 ft)), South Galala (1,464 metres (4,803 ft)), and North Galala (1,274 metres (4,180 ft)).

=== Plateaus ===
Sedimentary plateaus run on either side of the mountains. In general, the northern sections of these plateaus have a limestone base while the southern sections are sandstone. The plateau between the Nile River and the mountains is also known as the inland Eastern Desert and is subdivided into four sections: The Cairo-Suez Desert, The Limestone Desert, The Sandstone (Idfu-Kom Ombo) Desert, and the Nubian Desert.

=== Red Sea coast ===
The Red Sea coastland is the easternmost part of the Eastern Desert, running between Eritrea and the Gulf of Suez. The distance between the coastline and the base of the mountain range varies between 30 and 175 kilometres (19 and 109 mi).

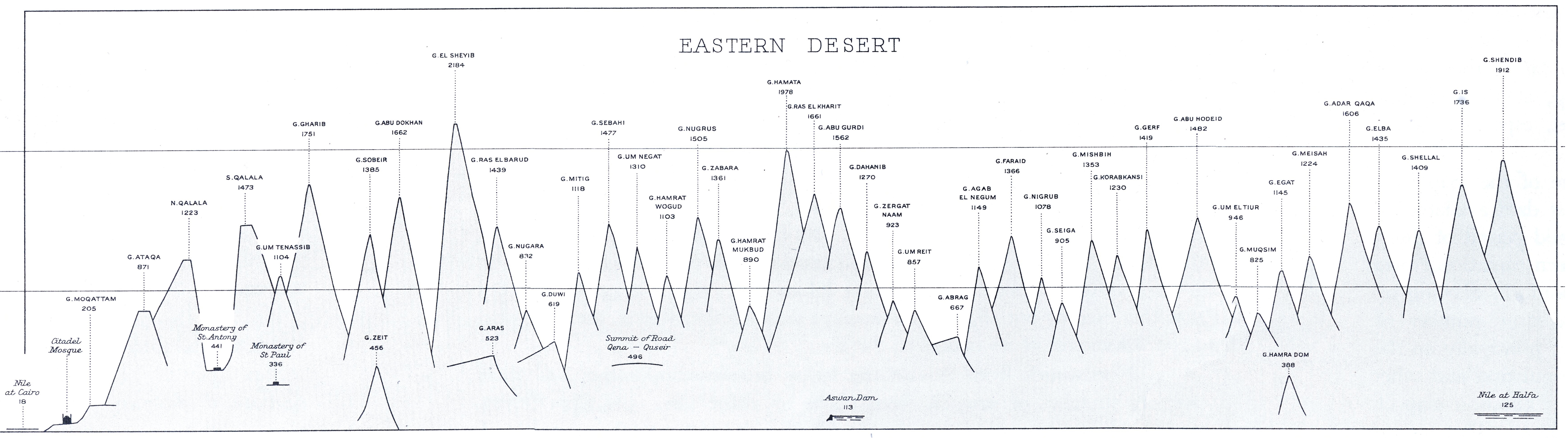
Comparative heights of the principal mountains of Egypt's Eastern Desert.

== Climate ==
The Eastern Desert has a semi-arid/arid/hyper-arid climate. On average, the region usually receives less than 25 millimetres (0.98 in) of rainfall per year in infrequent patterns. Most of the rainfall occurs during the winter months around the mountains. The mountains can create a rain shadow for the rest of the Desert, contributing to the arid environment.

Average temperatures are between 14 and 21 °C (57 and 70 °F) in winter (November–March) and 23.1 and 23.1 °C (73.6 and 73.6 °F) in summer (May–September). The weather is typically sunny; however, sandstorms can occur, usually between March and June. The storms (khamsins) are caused by tropical air moving up from Sudan, accompanied by strong winds and higher temperatures. The term khamsin comes from the Arabic word meaning fifty, as the storms occur on an average of fifty days per year.

=== Historic climate ===
Carbon dating of samples of fossil tufas, a type of limestone which is deposited in the presence of high groundwater levels, revealed that there had been two periods during which the Eastern Desert was significantly wetter than it is today. These occurred in the late Pleistocene, around 100,000 years ago, and the mid-Holocene, around 6,000 years ago. The most recent wet period is known to have been a result of summer monsoonal rains that moved over the Desert from the Indian Ocean. During these wet periods, some areas were swamps. The mountains and desert plateaus were also able to sustain more vegetation and animals. Between these wet periods the desert climate remained mostly arid, as it is today.

== Flora ==
Vegetation growing in the Eastern Desert is classified as either ephemeral or perennial. Ephemeral vegetation are plants which usually have a single season lifespan due to their dependence on rain. Perennial plants live for two or more years.

=== Coastal vegetation ===
There are three main ecosystems within the coastal region of the Eastern Desert: littoral salt marsh, coastal desert and coastal mountains. The presence of sea spray, tidal movements and salt water seepage means that vegetation in these areas must be well adapted to living in a saline environment.

==== Littoral salt marsh ====
The salt marsh is created as mud builds up on tidal flats and plants grow on the mud, making it a more stable and permanent ecosystem. The two main types of vegetation in this area are mangrove and salt marsh vegetation.

Avicennia marina, or grey mangrove is the dominant mangrove plant in the Red Sea area. It grows consistently along a large stretch of the Red Sea coast but is rarely seen to the North of the Egyptian city, Hurghada. Rhizophora mucronata, or loop-root mangrove, also grows co-dominantly with A.Marina in some areas along the coast but it is less prevalent. The loop-root mangrove is taller than the grey mangrove and thus, in areas where they do grow together, they form a two-tiered canopy of leaves. Small plants such as Cymodocea ciliata and Halophila oualis typically form the undergrowth of the mangrove community.

===== Salt marsh =====
The salt marsh vegetation is made up of a mix of shrub, succulent and grass species. The growth of these plants often creates the coastal dunes as the root systems hold the sand in place when other areas are left exposed to wind erosion.

Shrub communities

- Halocnemum strobilaceum is a woody sub-shrub which grows in the mud flats and on the sandy shoreline. It is most common on the northern section of the coast, near the Gulf of Suez.
- Arthrocaulon macrostachyum (syn. Arthrocnemum glaucum) is a flowering shrub which grows in similar areas to H. strobilaceum but is less prevalent in the North.
- Limonium pruinosum, also known as a species of sea lavender, grows commonly around the Gulf of Suez. Also from this family, the species of Limonium axillare contributes to up to 50% of vegetation cover on the South coast.
- Tamarix nilotica is a bush which grows in a variety of conditions along the Red Sea coast. The roots stabilise the sand to form dunes.

Succulent communities

- Zygophyllum album is a frequently occurring succulent community which is tolerant to different soil conditions and thus, is found all along the coast.
- Halopeplis perfoliata is a succulent species which commonly grows in the southern region of the Red Sea coast.
- Nitraria retusa and Suaeda monoica are succulent shrubs commonly located within the northern 700 km of the coast. They are separate communities but they grow together in the same area and they extend inland to the coastal desert plain area.
- Suaeda monoica grows in similar areas to N.retusa, however it is also found further south and is a common feature of the Eritrean and Sudanese coastal regions.

Grass communities

- Aeluropus brevifolius and Aeluropus lagopoides are two related species of creeping grasses which usually grows in dense patches all along the coast but are also known to form tall masses of interwoven roots and sand.
- Sporobolus spicatus, also known as salt grass, grows inland from A.brevifolius and A.lagopoides where sand deposits are deeper and the soil is less saline.
- Halopyrum mucronatum grows on hills and sand dunes. It is rare and is only found in a few locations along the coast.

==== Coastal desert ====
Coastal desert vegetation grow in the band between the littoral salt marsh and the base of the coastal mountains. In comparison to the littoral salt marsh area, the soil is non-saline and arid. The growing vegetation relies on the drainage of water from the mountains via wadis. As a result, growth of plants is seasonal, unlike in the littoral salt marsh. A greater variety of vegetation also grows in the area compared to the salt marsh area. The ephemeral vegetation includes a mix of grasses, succulents and herbaceous plants. Perennial vegetation is made up of succulents, grasses and woody shrub species.

==== Coastal mountains ====
The vegetation cover on the coastal mountains is more dense than on the coastal desert. There are over 400 plant species within the coastal mountains ecosystem, including shrubs, herbs and ferns. The distribution of these species varies subtly as the altitude changes.

=== Inland desert ===
The plants which grow on the inland plateaus vary greatly in their distribution and species due to the difference in sandstone and limestone rock bases and the varying amount of rain and runoff water from the wadis.

== Fauna ==
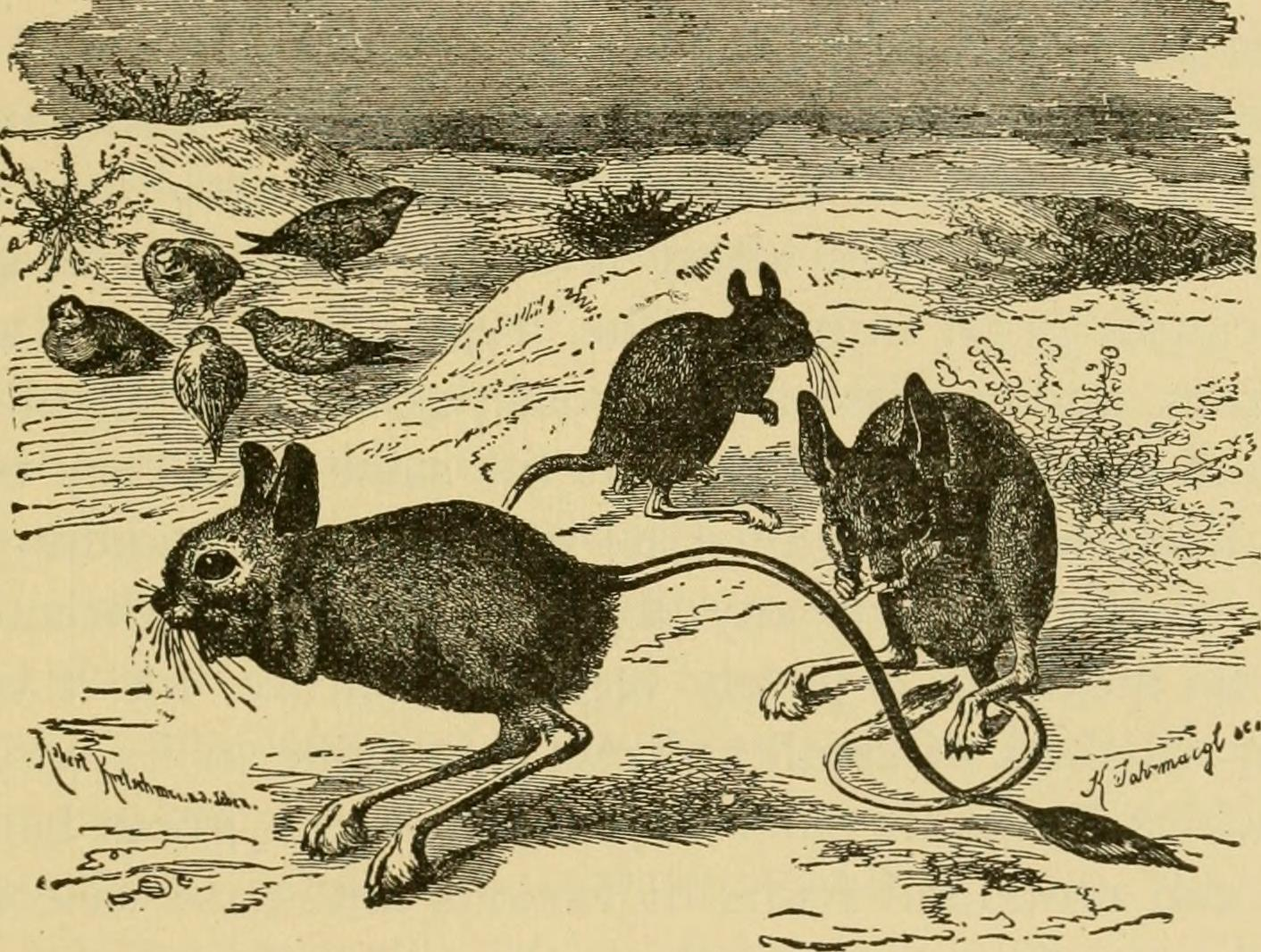
Drawing of jerboa in the desert

The wildlife of the Eastern Desert is quite different from that of the Western Desert, as the Nile River and Red Sea Mountains provide variable eco-regions. Small mammals such as the fennec fox, golden spiny mouse, bushy-tailed jird, jerboa and other rodents live on the plateaus of the Desert. Larger mammals include the hyrax, Egyptian mongoose and Egyptian wolf. The Red Sea Hills provide a unique mountainous habitat which increases the diversity of fauna in the Eastern Desert. Species found in the mountains include the aoudad, a mountain dwelling species of sheep, the Nubian ibex and the dorcas gazelle. The mountain range provides a habitat for a variety of birds including the golden eagle and the bearded vulture, which are rarely found in any other areas of the Sahara. The Nile Valley is a central location for bird migration and there are more than 200 species of birds which pass through the western side of the Eastern Desert during migration seasons.

== Natural resources and mining ==
The mining of precious metals dates back to ancient Egypt and continues today. From the early Pharaonic era (3000 BC), copper and gold were mined from the Desert and used to make tools and for jewellery and embellishment. It was not until much later, around 1000 BC, that iron was also discovered and began to be mined. Wadis were used as routes to cart the mined materials back to the civilisation. There were also mines for gemstones such as emeralds and amethysts that were discovered by the Ancient Egyptians, and used during the Roman and Islamic periods. Valuable building and sculpting materials have also been mined from the Eastern Desert such as limestone, granite and marble. Today, most of the mining that occurs in and around the Eastern Desert is for crude oil and natural gas.

== History ==
The earliest signs of humans in the desert was found in the form of flint tools from 250,000 BC.

=== The Mesolithic period (10,000–5,000 BC) ===
Around 25,000 BC, the land underwent significant climatic change which transformed the grassy plains into desert. This made the land much less habitable, driving nomads which had inhabited what is now the Eastern Desert towards the Nile River.

=== Pharaonic Egypt (3000–30 BC) ===
Trade routes from the Nile to the Red Sea were established through the Desert. Notably, there was a route between the Nile River and Mersa Gawasis, an ancient Egyptian port. There were also many mines and quarries along this route. Boats were carried in pieces across the desert through the wadis and then set up once they reached the port to embark on expeditions. The ancient Egyptians exploited the desert resources of copper, gold, iron and precious stones. As well as for trade, they used these resources to improve their society and in their burials.

=== Roman period (30 BC–AD 395) ===
Commercial trade increased further during the Roman period (30 BC–AD 395) and more trade routes were established across the desert. Red Sea ports were points of embarkation for trade with India. During the Ptolemaic and Roman period the chief port was Berenice Troglodytica, and the Via Hadriana led from Berenice to Antinoöpolis on the Nile. Items being traded diversified during this period to include goods such as fabrics and pearls. Imperial porphyry was quarried at Mons Claudianus into the Byzantine era. The Romans set up multiple ports along the Red Sea coast. Roman soldiers lived and worked at these ports. Their main sources of food were pigs, donkeys and camels.

=== Today ===
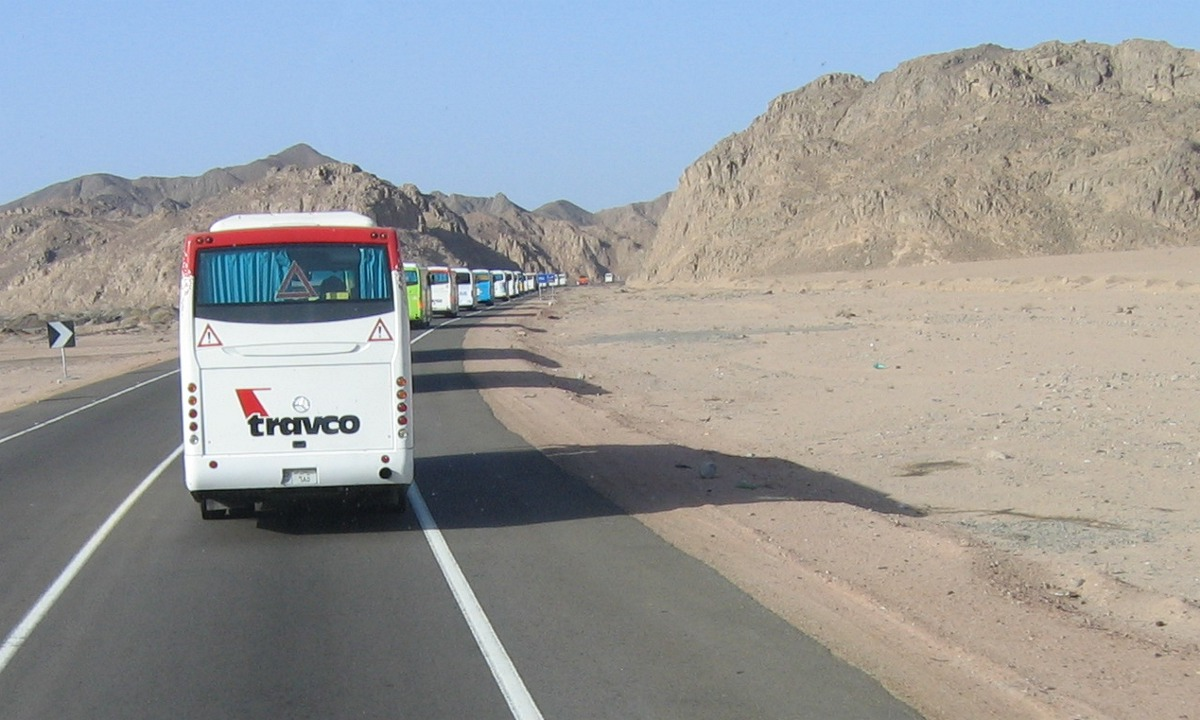
Tourist buses in the Eastern Desert

The Eastern Desert is a popular site for tours, safaris and other expeditions. Mining still occurs in the Desert.

In March 2025, archaeologists from the French Institute of Oriental Archaeology uncovered two sets of iron ankle shackles at the Ghozza gold mine dating to the 3rd century BCE, during the Ptolemaic period. The discovery provides evidence of forced labor in ancient Egyptian gold mining operations, corroborating historical texts that mention the use of prisoners of war and criminals in such mines.

== Gallery ==
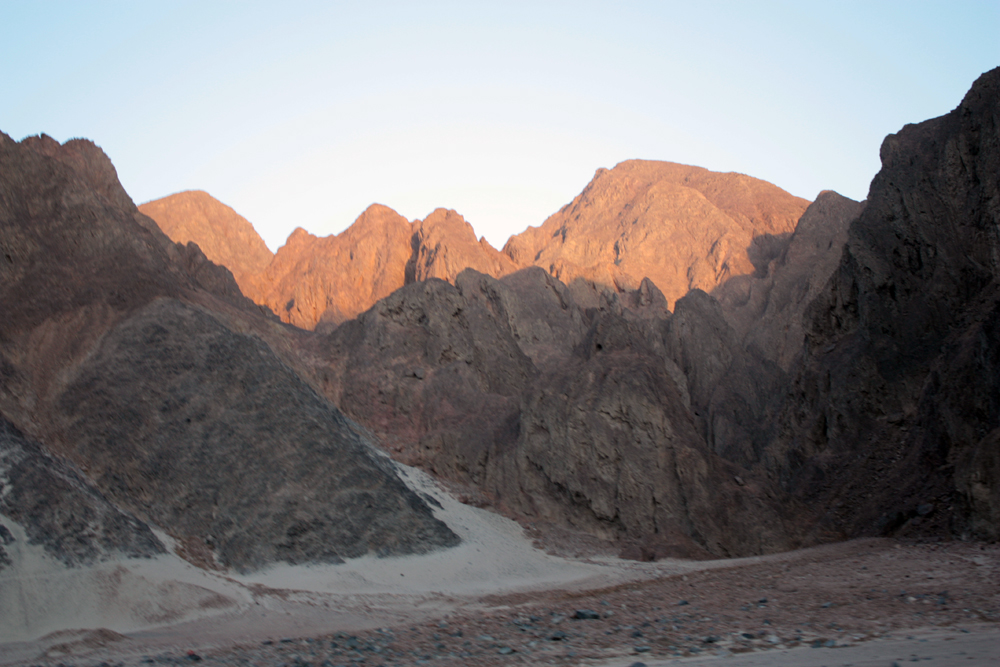
The Eastern Desert mountain range along the Safaga-Qena Road

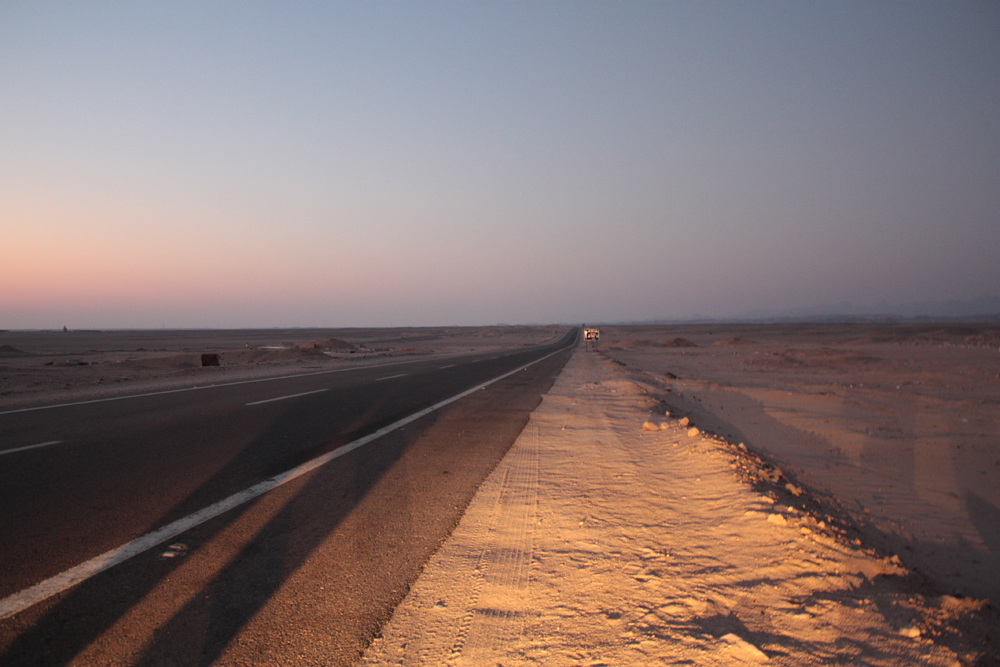
The Eastern Desert along the Hurghada-Safaga Road

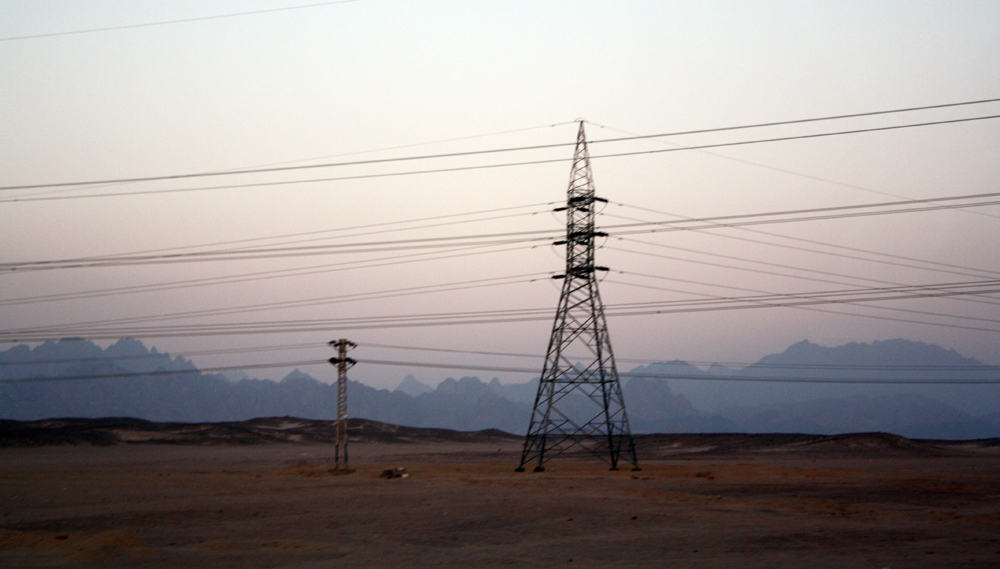
Early morning with the Eastern Desert mountain range on the horizon

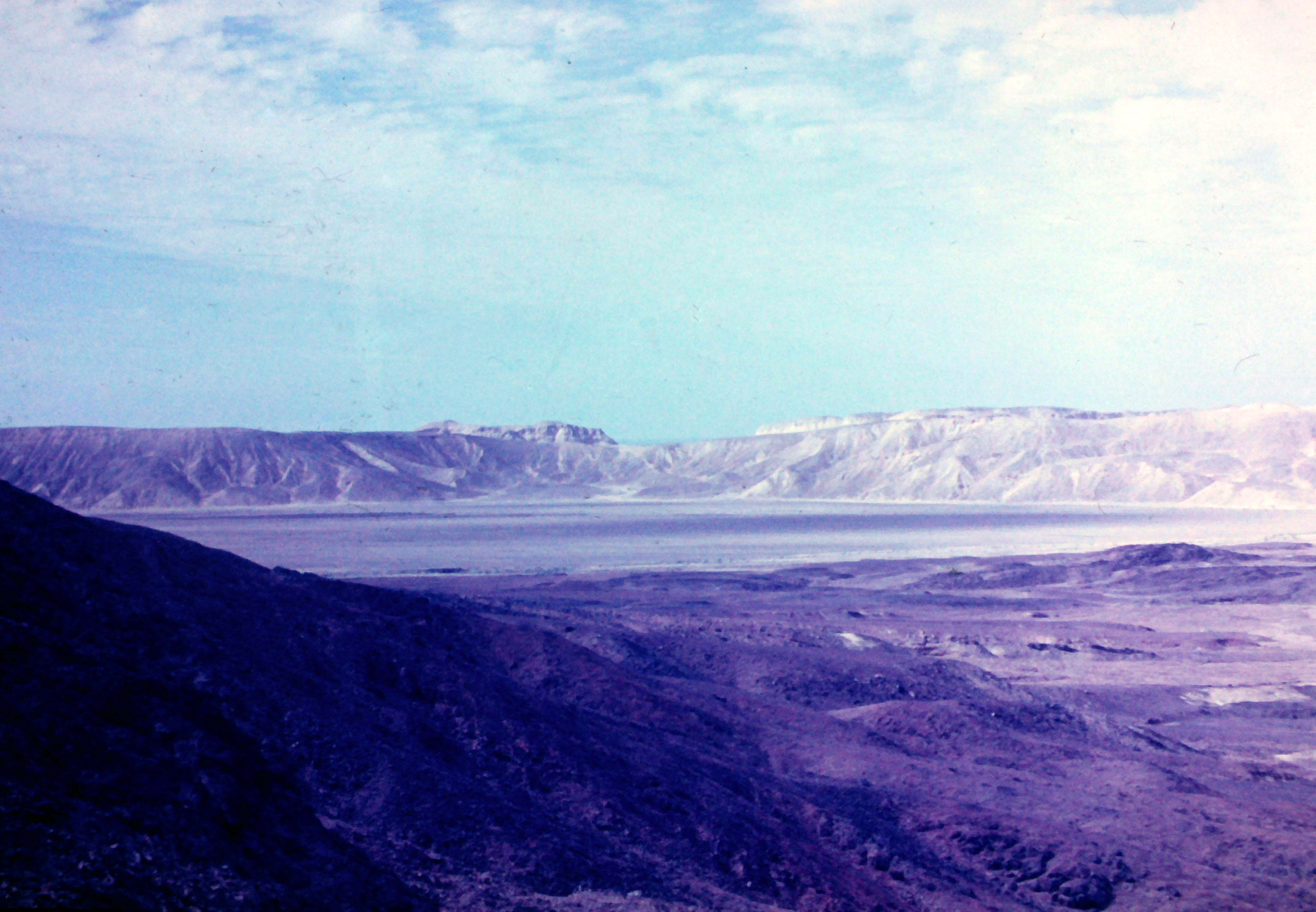
The Eastern Desert, with mountain ranges in view

== See also ==
- Anthony the Great
- Geography of Egypt
- Libyan Desert (Western Desert)

== General bibliography ==
- Ball, John (1912), The geography and geology of south-eastern Egypt , Cairo: Government Press.
- Bard, Kathryn A.; Fattovich, Rodolfo (2015). "Mersa/Wadi Gawasis and Ancient Egyptian Maritime Trade in the Red Sea". Near Eastern Archaeology. 78 (1). University of Chicago Press: 4–11. doi:10.5615/neareastarch.78.1.0004. ISSN 1094-2076. S2CID 164065135.
- Barnard, H., & Duistermaat, K. (2012). The history of the peoples of the Eastern Desert. University of California.
- Eastern Desert - Peakbagger.com. Peakbagger.com. (2021). Retrieved 23 April 2021, from https://www.peakbagger.com/range.aspx?rid=614.
- Egypt – The Eastern Desert. (2021). Retrieved from https://www.britannica.com/place/Egypt/The-Eastern-Desert
- Hoath, R. (2009). Field guide to the mammals of Egypt. The American University in Cairo Press.
- Johnston, Harry (2011). "The Eastern Basin of the Nile". The Nile Quest. Cambridge: Cambridge University Press. pp. 276–292. doi:10.1017/cbo9781139051811.028. ISBN 978-1-139-05181-1.
- Sanders, D. (2017). Mining Resources in Ancient Egypt. Retrieved from https://sciencing.com/mining-resources-ancient-egypt-11732.html
- The red land: the illustrated archaeology of Egypt's Eastern Desert. American Library Association. 1 September 2009.
- Van der Veen, M., Bouchaud, C., Cappers, R., & Newton, C. (2021). The Eastern Desert of Egypt during the Greco-Roman period: archaeological reports. College de France. https://orcid.org/0000-0003-4834-0269
- Williams, Martin (14 December 2018). The Nile Basin. Cambridge University Press. doi:10.1017/9781316831885. ISBN 978-1-316-83188-5. S2CID 133979638.
- Zahran, Mahmoud Abdel (1992). "The Sinai Peninsula". The Vegetation of Egypt. Dordrecht: Springer Netherlands. pp. 261–302. doi:10.1007/978-94-015-8066-3_5. ISBN 978-0-412-31510-7. S2CID 129238107.
