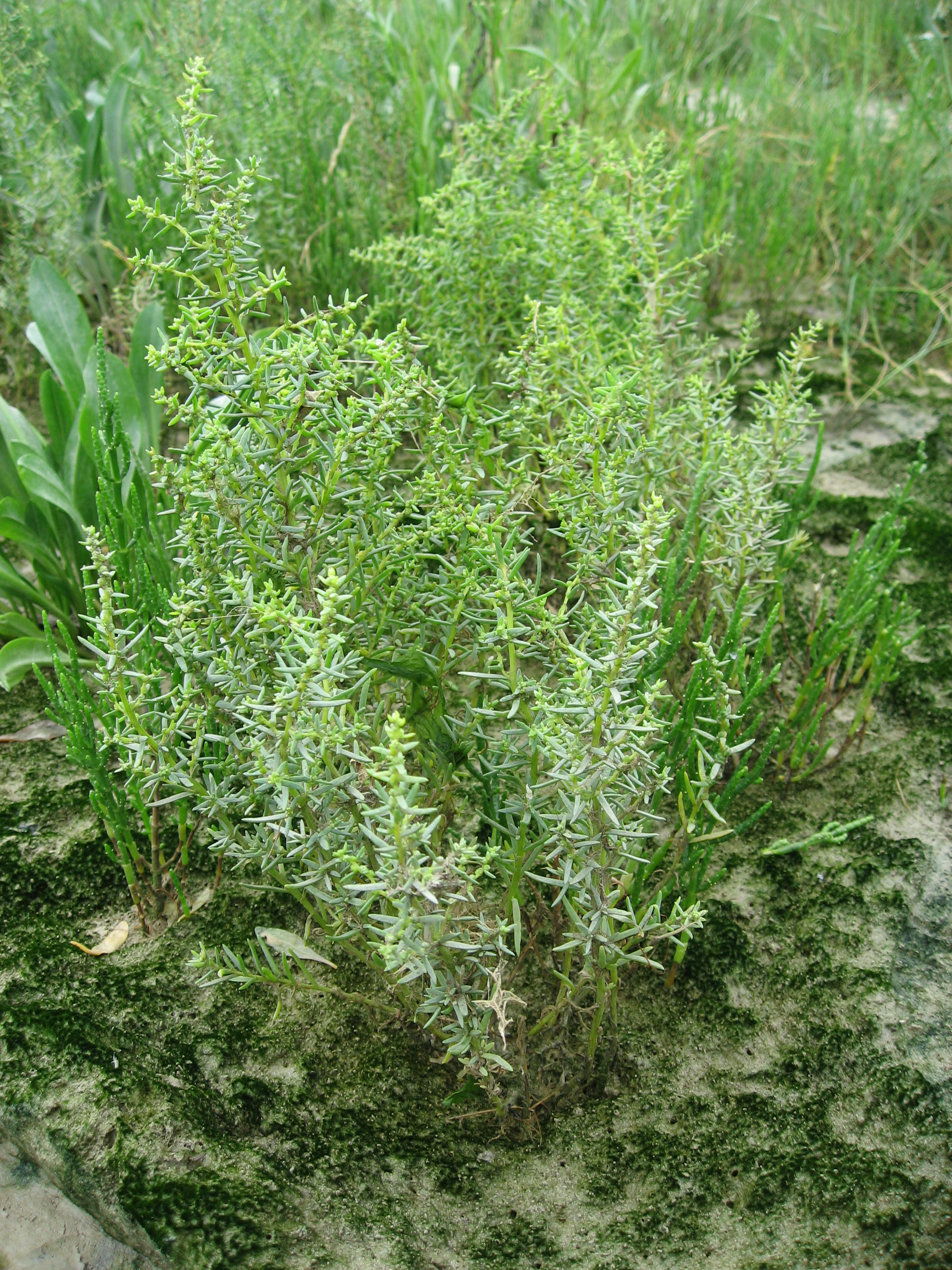

Scientific classification
- Kingdom: Plantae
- Clade: Tracheophytes
- Clade: Angiosperms
- Clade: Eudicots
- Order: Caryophyllales
- Family: Amaranthaceae
- Genus: Suaeda
- Species: S. maritima

Binomial name
- Suaeda maritima (L.) Dumort.

Synonyms
- List: Atriplex maritima (L.) Crantz; Chenopodina aestuaria Dumort.; Chenopodina bacciformis Dumort.; Chenopodina filiformis Moq.; Chenopodina maritima (L.) Moq.; Chenopodina maritima var. erecta Moq.; Chenopodina sativa Moq.; Chenopodina spicata Moq.; Chenopodina tortuosa Moq.; Chenopodium filiforme Dumort.; Chenopodium hostii Ledeb.; Chenopodium jacquinii Ten.; Chenopodium macrocarpum Desv.; Chenopodium maritimum L.; Chenopodium spicatum Schult.; Cochliospermum cavanillesii Lag.; Dondia fernaldii Standl.; Dondia maritima (L.) Druce; Dondia richii (Fernald) A.Heller; Kochia sedoides (L.) Schrad.; Lerchia maritima (L.) Kuntze; Salsola carnosa Moq.; Salsola chenopodiana Moq.; Salsola hostii Tratt.; Salsola indica Willd.; Salsola marina Moq.; Salsola maritima (L.) M.Bieb.; Salsola scabra Moq.; Salsola sedoides L.; Salsola strobilifera Moq.; Salsola succulenta Moq.; Schoberia crassifolia Steud.; Schoberia indica (Willd.) Kostel.; Schoberia macrocarpa C.A.Mey.; Schoberia maritima (L.) C.A.Mey.; Suaeda aestuaria Dumort.; Suaeda albescens Lázaro Ibiza; Suaeda bacciformis Dumort.; Suaeda cavanillesiana (Lázaro Ibiza) Cout.; Suaeda fernaldii (Standl.) Standl.; Suaeda filiformis Dumort.; Suaeda indica (Willd.) Moq.; Suaeda jacquinii Dumort.; Suaeda littoralis Grecescu; Suaeda macrocarpa Moq.; Suaeda maritima var. aestuaria (Dumort.) P.D.Sell; Suaeda maritima var. bacciformis (Dumort.) P.D.Sell; Suaeda maritima var. erecta (Moq.) P.D.Sell; Suaeda maritima var. purpurascens P.D.Sell; Suaeda richii Fernald; Suaeda tortuosa Moq.

= Suaeda maritima =

Species of flowering plant in the amaranth family

Suaeda maritima is a species of flowering plant in the family Amaranthaceae known by the common names herbaceous seepweed and annual seablite.

== Description ==
It is a yellow-green shrub with fleshy, succulent leaves and green flowers. It grows to about 35 cm (14 in) in salt marshes. It is edible as a leaf vegetable, and due to its high salt content it can be used in combination with other foods as a seasoning. It is found worldwide, but in North America it is primarily located on the northern east coast: in New England, S. maritima ssp. maritima is introduced, while the native species is S. maritima ssp. richii. The native New England species is on endangered rare plant lists in Massachusetts (rare) and Maine, New Hampshire and Rhode Island (extremely rare, S1), subject to protection and prohibition from disturbance.

== Habitat ==
This plant resides in aquatic, terrestrial, and wetland habitats. But mainly in salt marshes and sea shores, usually below the high water mark. Additionally, Suaeda maritima is able to catch mud and help build up the marshes.

== Development ==
The leaves are simple and arranged alternatively, with one leaf per node along the stem. Their leaves also absorb large amounts of salt and will turn red when oversaturated. The flower can be either radially symmetrical or bilaterally symmetrical.

== Life cycle ==
The life cycle of Suaeda maritima is known to be mainly annually. This plant will perform its entire life cycle from seed to flower then back to a seed within a single growing season. All roots, stems and leaves of the Suaeda maritima plant will die and the only thing that can bridge the gap between each generation is a dormant seed.

== Medicine ==
There are currently no known medical sources that the Suaeda maritima plant is used for.

== Food ==
As cited earlier, this plant may be subject to protection and prohibition from harvest or disturbance. The young leaves of sea blite can be consumed raw or cooked, although it has a strong salty flavor. The seeds are also consumable raw or cooked.

The ashes of the sea blite have been used to create a material used in making soap and glass.
