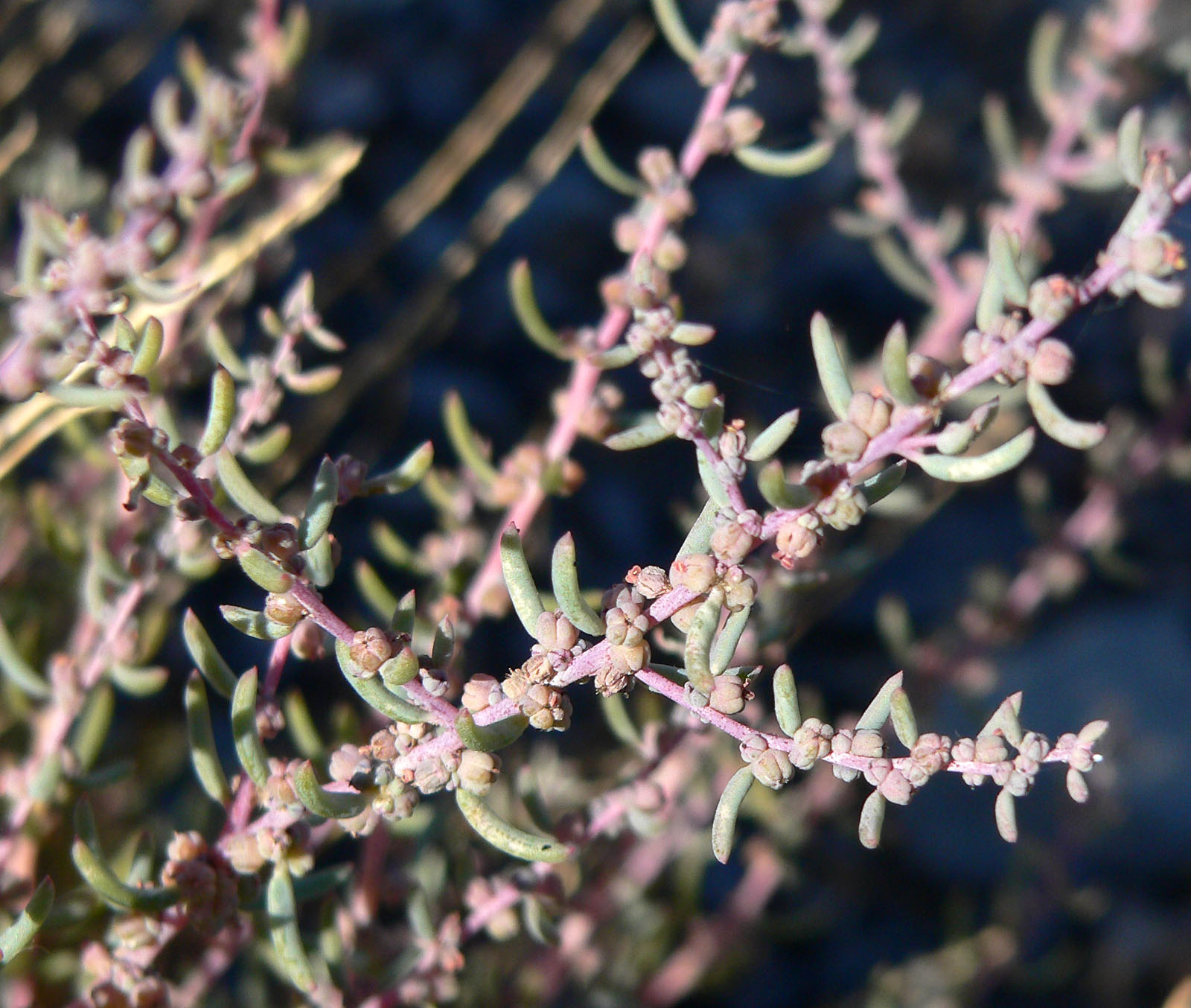

Scientific classification
- Kingdom: Plantae
- Clade: Tracheophytes
- Clade: Angiosperms
- Clade: Eudicots
- Order: Caryophyllales
- Family: Amaranthaceae
- Genus: Suaeda
- Species: S. nigra

Binomial name
- Suaeda nigra (Raf.) J.F.Macbr.

Synonyms
- Suaeda fruticosa misapplied, with the incorrect attribution (L.) Forssk.; Chenopodium nigrum Raf.; Chenopodina moquinii Torrey; Dondia ramosissima Standl.; Suaeda duripes I.M.Johnston; Suaeda intermedia S.Watson; Suaeda moquinii (Torrey) Greene; Suaeda nigrescens I.M.Johnston; Suaeda ramosissima (Standl.) I.M.Johnston; Suaeda suffrutescens S.Watson; Suaeda suffrutescens var. detonsa I.M.Johnston; Suaeda torreyana S.Watson; Suaeda torreyana var. ramosissima (Standley) Munz

= Suaeda nigra =

Species of flowering plant

Suaeda nigra, often still known by the former name Suaeda moquinii, is a species of flowering plant in the amaranth family, known by the vernacular names bush seepweed or Mojave sea-blite.

== Taxonomy ==
Suaeda nigra was first formally described as a new species by Constantine Samuel Rafinesque in 1832. Its holotype was collected by Edwin James along the Canadian River in the Texas panhandle in 1820. In 1827 John Torrey tentatively misidentified this specimen as "Chenopodium maritimum L. ?", but only in 1856 did Torrey finally describe the taxon as Chenopodina moquini. In 1889 Edward Lee Greene moved it to the genus Suaeda (he continued to misspell it as moquini). Aven Nelson corrected the name to moquinii in 1909, and the species was often known under the name Suaeda moquinii until the 21st century.

Rafinesque had named the Texas specimen Chenopodium nigrum on the basis of Torrey's 1827 summary description of the specimen. In 1918 James Francis Macbride moved it to the genus Suaeda, but in 1977 C. O. Hopkins and W. H. Blackwell argued that this name was both a nomen nudum and superfluous (not based on a real holotype), only for H. J. Schenk and W. R. Ferren Jr. to argue in 2001 that Rafinesque had clearly referenced Torrey's description of the specimen, and that it was thus provided with both a formal taxonomic description as well as a type.

== Description ==
Suaeda nigra is genetically diverse and quite variable in appearance. The species is a shrub or subshrub growing from a woody base with many spreading branches, reaching up to 1.5 metres (4.9 ft) in height. The plants may be facultative annuals when they find themselves growing in seasonally flooded wetlands.

It may be hairy to hairless but is usually waxy. It may be green to red to dark purple in color, sometimes almost black. The succulent leaves are linear to lance-shaped, 1 to 3 centimetres long, and flat or cylindrical.

Flowers occur in clusters along the upper stems, each cluster containing 1 to 12 flowers. Leaf-like bracts accompany the clusters. The flower has no petals and is composed of a calyx of fleshy, rounded sepals.

The fruit is an utricle that grows within the calyx.

== Distribution ==
Suaeda nigra is native to much of western North America, from central Canada through the Western United States, Great Basin, the Mojave Desert in California, and into northern Mexico.

== Ecology ==
It grows in many types of habitat with saline and alkaline substrates, such as desert flats, dry lakes (locally called 'playas') and seeps.

It is mostly an inland species but is occasionally seen in coastal areas, such as estuaries.
