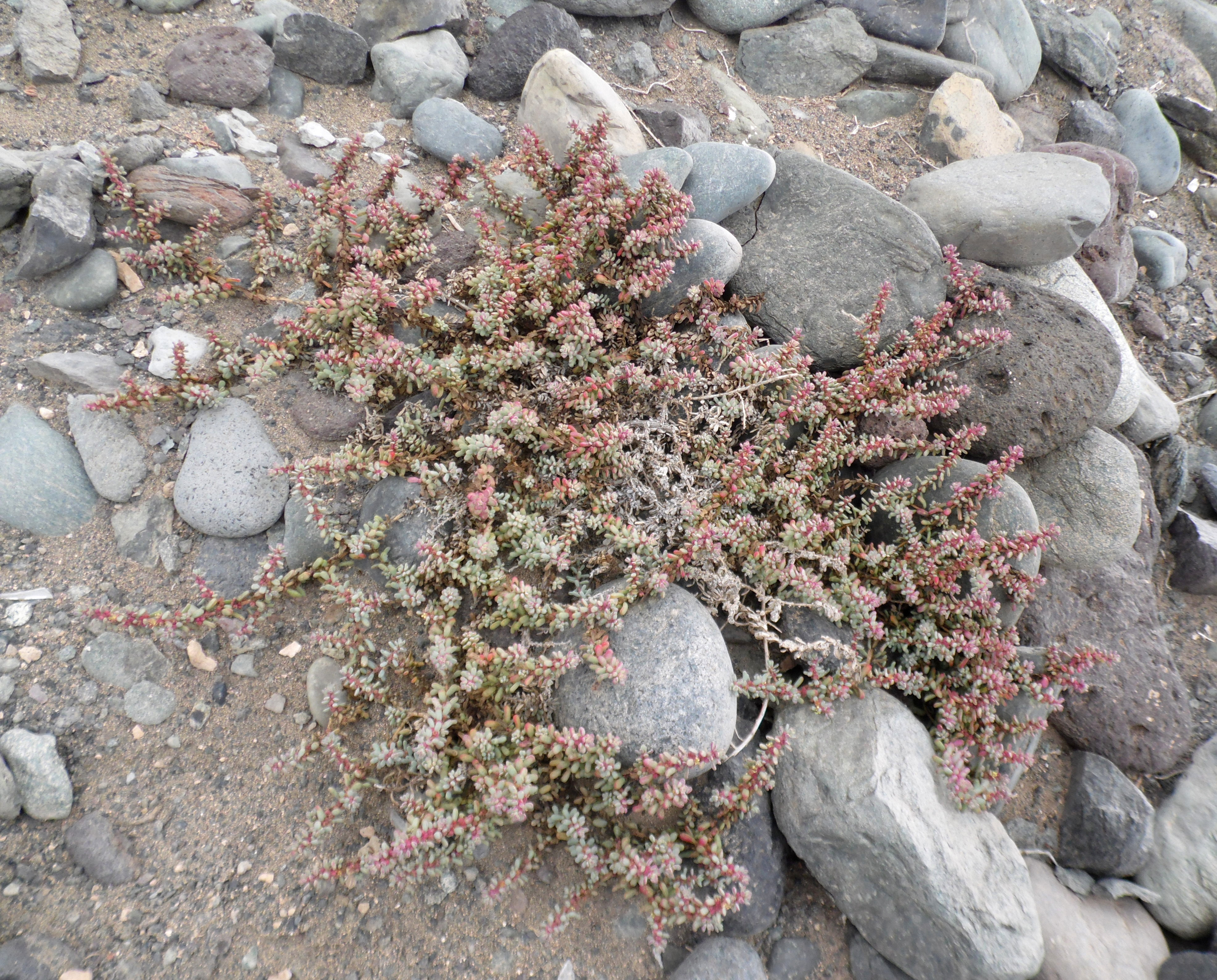
- -Suaeda vermiculata in Pozo de Izquierdo on Gran Canaria, Canary Islands

Scientific classification
- Kingdom: Plantae
- Clade: Tracheophytes
- Clade: Angiosperms
- Clade: Eudicots
- Order: Caryophyllales
- Family: Amaranthaceae
- Genus: Suaeda
- Species: S. vermiculata

Binomial name
- Suaeda vermiculata Forssk. ex. J.F.Gmel.

Synonyms
- Chenopodium alexandrinum Desf. ex Moq.

= Suaeda vermiculata =

Species of flowering plant

Suaeda vermiculata is a species of plant in the family Amaranthaceae (formerly classified under the Chenopodiaceae). It is a salt-tolerant plant (halophyte) that grows naturally in salt-affected areas.

== Description ==
It is a shrub and can grow to 0.4–1 m height, with woody stems at its base, very branched.

== Distribution ==
Its distribution includes Africa and the Middle East, including North Africa, the Arabian Peninsula, Yemen's Socotra, Iraq, Jordan and Palestine to the east of India as well as the Canary Islands in Cape Verde and from Senegal, Mauritania and Mali to Chad, Sudan, South Sudan, Kenya, Ethiopia and Somalia.

== Ecology ==
They are found in coastal bushlands as well as inland saline sites, sand plains, stony places and desert wadis between sea level and 400 meters in altitude. It also occurs in dry riverbeds and other saline locations in southern Africa in association with Tamarix usneoides and the grass Odyssea paucinervis.
