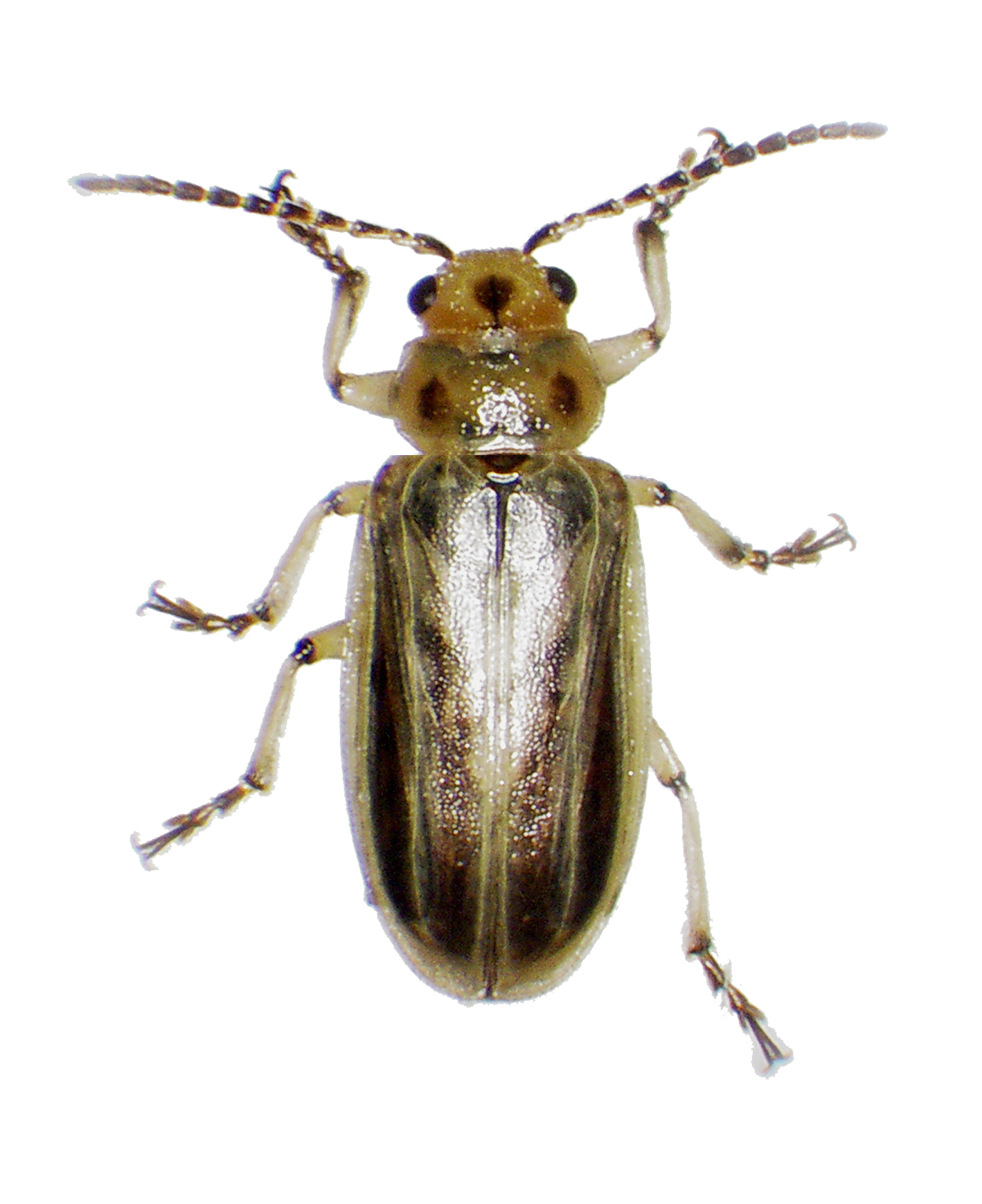

Scientific classification
- Kingdom: Animalia
- Phylum: Arthropoda
- Clade: Pancrustacea
- Class: Insecta
- Order: Coleoptera
- Suborder: Polyphaga
- Infraorder: Cucujiformia
- Family: Chrysomelidae
- Genus: Diorhabda
- Species: D. sublineata

Binomial name
- Diorhabda sublineata (H. Lucas, 1849)

Synonyms
- Galeruca sublineata H. Lucas, 1849; Diorhabda elongata sublineata (H. Lucas, 1849)

= Diorhabda sublineata =

Species of beetle

Diorhabda sublineata is a leaf beetle known as the subtropical tamarisk beetle (STB). The species was first described by Hippolyte Lucas in 1849. It feeds on tamarisk trees from Portugal, Spain and France to Morocco, Senegal, Algeria, Tunisia, Egypt, Yemen, and Iraq. It is used in North America as a biological pest control agent against saltcedar or tamarisk (Tamarix spp.), an invasive species in arid and semi-arid ecosystems (where the STB and its closely related sibling species also may be less accurately referred to as the 'saltcedar beetle', 'saltcedar leaf beetle', 'salt cedar leaf beetle', or 'tamarisk leaf beetle') (Tracy and Robbins 2009).

== Taxonomy ==
The STB was first described from Annaba, Algeria as Galeruca sublineata H. Lucas (1849). Reiche and Saulcy (1858) erroneously placed G. sublineata as a junior synonym to the sibling species G. elongata Brullé (the Mediterranean tamarisk beetle, Diorhabda elongata). Weise (1893) created the genus Diorhabda and proposed the variety Diorhaba elongata var. sublineata (H. Lucas). Gressitt and Kimoto (1963) proposed the subspecies D. e. sublineata. Tracy and Robbins (2009) restored D. sublineata (H. Lucas) as a valid species based on comparisons of the male and female genitalia, and provided illustrated taxonomic keys separating the STB from the four other sibling species of the D. elongata (Brullé) species group: Diorhabda elongata, Diorhabda carinata (Faldermann), Diorhabda carinulata (Desbrochers), and Diorhabda meridionalis Berti and Rapilly. In literature prior to 2009, D. sublineata was usually also referred to as D. elongata, or as a subspecies or color variant of D. elongata.

== Host plants ==
Field collections in Spain and north Africa reveal that the STB feeds on at least five species of tamarisks, including Tamarix gallica which hybridizes with the widely invasive T. ramosisima in western North America. The STB can become numerous in Egypt and Senegal, but reports on defoliation of tamarisk are lacking (Tracy and Robbins 2009). Extensive laboratory host range studies verified that STB is a specialist feeder on tamarisks, feeding only on plants of the tamarisk family, Tamaricaceae. In laboratory and field cage studies, the STB will also feed and complete development on Frankenia shrubs, distant relatives of tamarisks in the same plant order Caryophyllales, but STB greatly prefer to lay eggs upon tamarisk (Milbrath and DeLoach 2006).

== Life cycle ==
The STB overwinters as adults on the ground. Adults become active and begin feeding and mating in the early spring when tamarisk leaves are budding. Eggs are laid on tamarisk leaves and bark and hatch in about a week in warm weather. Three larval stages feed on tamarisk leaves for about two and a half weeks when they crawl to the ground and spend about 5 days as a C-shaped inactive prepupa before pupating about one week. Adults emerge from pupae to complete the life cycle in about 4–5 weeks in the summer. (For images of various life stages of a related species, see Diorhabda carinulata at Commons.) Five generations of STB occur through spring and fall in central Texas (Milbrath et al. 2007). Similar to the northern tamarisk beetle, adults begin to enter diapause in the late summer and early fall, ceasing reproduction and feeding to build fat bodies before seeking a protected place to overwinter (Lewis et al. 2003). Larvae and adults are sensitive to shorter daylengths as the summer progresses that signal the coming of winter and induce diapause (Bean et al. in prep.). Robert Bartelt and Allard Cossé (USDA-ARS, Peoria, Illinois) found that male STB emit a putative aggregation pheromone, similar to that found in Diorhabda carinulata (Cossé et al. 2005), that could serve to attract both males and females to certain tamarisk trees.

== Biological control agent ==
Establishment of the STB as a biological control agent for tamarisk along the Rio Grande in West Texas was confirmed in 2010 (Knutson 2010). Populations of STB from around 35°N latitude near Sfax, Tunisia were initially released by the USDA Agricultural Research Service in south Texas in 2005, but failed to establish. During the spring and summer of 2009, populations from around 34° latitude near Marith, Tunisia were released in south and west Texas (Tracy and Robbins 2009). These populations were showing promising signs of establishment on the Rio Grande, such as near Presidio, Texas at Alamito Marsh, by the fall of 2009 (MacCormack 2009). By August 2010, the STB had defoliated about 23 miles of tamarisk along the Rio Grande near Presidio, but it was causing concern by also defoliating the related but non-target athel tamarisk (Tamarix aphylla) trees, a taller species of tamarisk used around Presidio and neighboring Mexican communities for shade (Haines 2010). The STB may be better adapted to subtropical interior desert habitats and subtropical Mediterranean habitats than other Old World tamarisk beetles that are being introduced, such as the Mediterranean tamarisk beetle, Diorhabda elongata. The northern tamarisk beetle, Diorhabda carinulata, is probably better adapted to northern cold deserts in North America where it is widely established, and the larger tamarisk beetle, Diorhabda carinata, is probably better adapted to warm temperate grasslands and deserts (Tracy and Robbins 2009).

Tamarisk does not usually die from a single defoliation from tamarisk beetles, and it can resprout within several weeks of defoliation. Repeated defoliation of individual tamarisk trees can lead to severe dieback the next season and death of the tree within several years (DeLoach and Carruthers 2004). Tamarisk beetle defoliation over the course of at least one to several years can severely reduce the nonstructural carbohydrate reserves in the root crowns of tamarisk (Hudgeons et al. 2007). Biological control of tamarisk by the STB will not eradicate tamarisk but it has the potential to suppress tamarisk populations by 75–85%, after which both STB and tamarisk populations should reach equilibrium at lower levels (DeLoach and Carruthers 2004, Tracy and DeLoach 1999).

A primary objective of tamarisk biological control with the STB is to reduce competition by exotic tamarisk with a variety of native riparian flora, including trees (willows, cottonwoods, and honey mesquite), shrubs (wolfberry, saltbush, and baccharis), and grasses (alkali sacaton, saltgrass, and vinemesquite). Unlike expensive chemical and mechanical controls of tamarisk that often must be repeated, tamarisk biological control does not harm native flora and is self-sustaining in the environment. Recovery of native riparian grasses can be quite rapid under the once closed canopy of repeatedly defoliated tamarisk. However, tamarisk beetle defoliation can locally reduce nesting habitat for riparian woodland birds until native woodland flora are able to return. In some areas, tamarisk may be replaced by grasslands or shrublands, resulting in losses of riparian forest habitats for birds (Tracy and DeLoach 1999). Releases of tamarisk beetles in southern California, Arizona, and along the Rio Grande in western New Mexico, are currently delayed until concerns can be resolved regarding safety of tamarisk biological control to nesting habitats of the federally endangered southwestern willow flycatcher, Empidonax traillii Audubon subspecies extimus Phillips, which will nest in tamarisk (see DeLoach et al. 2000, Dudley and DeLoach 2004).
