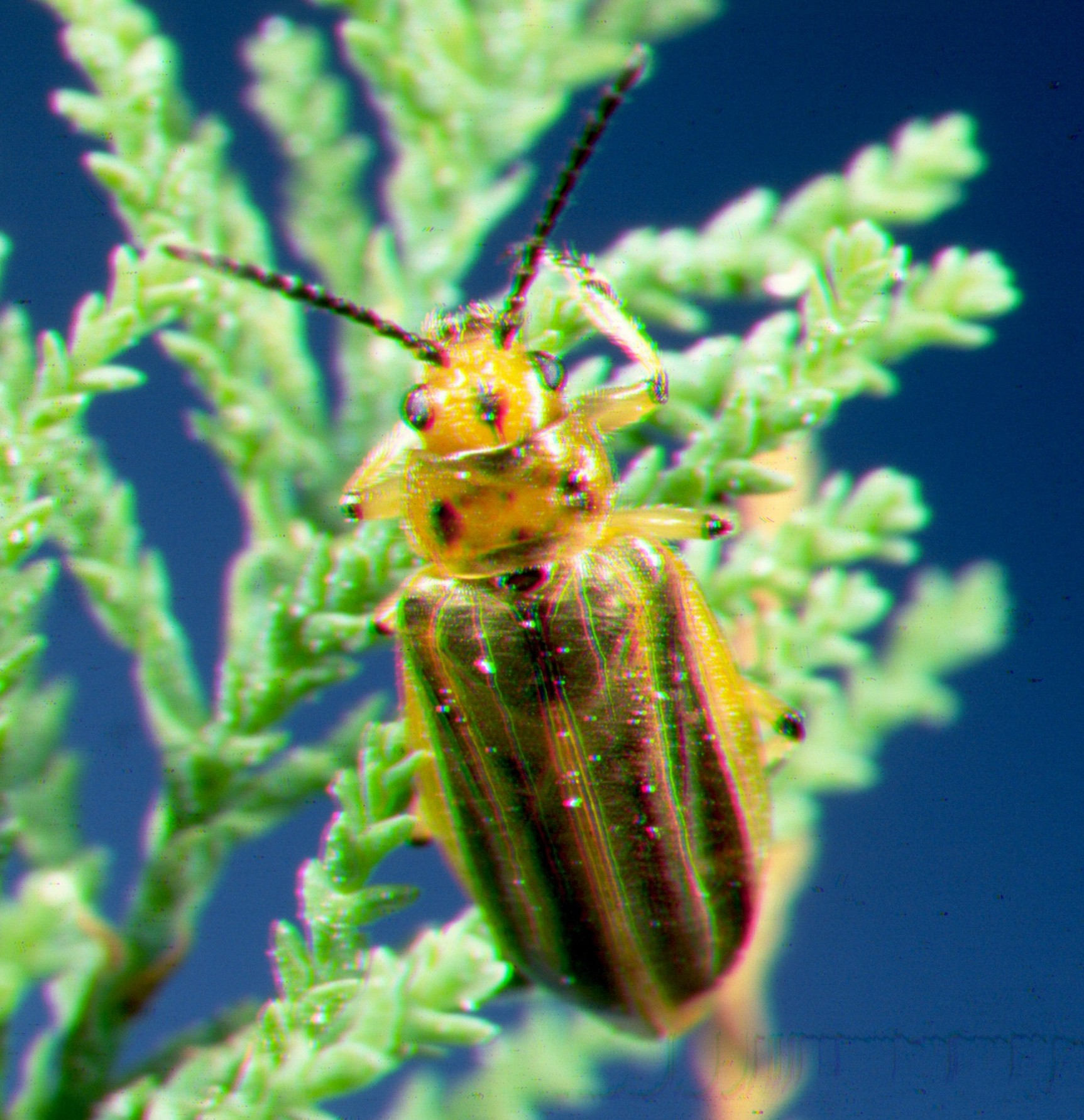

Scientific classification
- Kingdom: Animalia
- Phylum: Arthropoda
- Clade: Pancrustacea
- Class: Insecta
- Order: Coleoptera
- Suborder: Polyphaga
- Infraorder: Cucujiformia
- Family: Chrysomelidae
- Genus: Diorhabda
- Species: D. carinata

Binomial name
- Diorhabda carinata (Faldermann, 1837)

Synonyms
- Galeruca carinata Faldermann, 1837; Diorhabda elongata carinata (Faldermann, 1837)

= Diorhabda carinata =

Species of beetle

Diorhabda carinata is a species of leaf beetle known as the larger tamarisk beetle (larger tamarisk beetle) which feeds on tamarisk trees from Ukraine, eastern Turkey and Syria east to northwest China, Kyrgyzstan and Pakistan, extending as far south as southern Iran. (Note: Tracy and Robbins (2009) provide a detailed review of the distribution, biogeography, biology, and taxonomy of D. carinata.) It is used in North America as a biological pest control agent against saltcedar or tamarisk (Tamarix spp.), an invasive species in arid and semi-arid ecosystems (where the larger tamarisk beetle and its closely related sibling species also may be less accurately referred to as the 'saltcedar beetle', 'saltcedar leaf beetle', 'salt cedar leaf beetle', or 'tamarisk leaf beetle').

== Taxonomy ==
The larger tamarisk beetle was first described from the Transcaucasus (Georgia and Azerbaijan) as Galeruca carinata Faldermann, 1837. Reiche and Saulcy placed G. carinata as a junior synonym to the sibling species G. elongata Brullé (the Mediterranean tamarisk beetle, Diorhabda elongata). Weise created the genus Diorhabda in 1893 and proposed the color variant Diorhaba elongata var. carinata (Faldermann), and he also placed the sibling species Galeruca carinulata Desbrochers (the northern tamarisk beetle, Diorhabda carinulata) as a junior synonym of this variant. Jan Bechyné (1961) proposed the subspecies D. e. carinata listing specimens from Afghanistan. Berti and Rapilly (1973) recognized D. carinata and D. carinulata as separate species from one another, and, by implication, as separate species from D. elongata, based on detailed morphology of the endophallus of the male genitalia. Tracy and Robbins (2009) confirmed the 1973 findings of Berti and Rapilly, further characterized the male and female genitalia of D. carinata, and provided illustrated taxonomic keys separating the larger tamarisk beetle from the four other sibling species of the D. elongata (Brullé) species group: Diorhabda elongata, Diorhabda sublineata (Lucas), Diorhabda carinulata, and Diorhabda meridionalis Berti and Rapilly. In literature prior to 2009, D. carinata was usually also referred to as D. elongata, or subspecies of D. elongata.

== Host plants ==
Field collections in Eurasia reveal that the larger tamarisk beetle feeds on at least nine species of tamarisks, including Tamarix ramosissima which is widely invasive in western North America. The larger tamarisk beetle will severely defoliate tamarisk in Turkmenistan and Tajikistan. Extensive laboratory host range studies verified that larger tamarisk beetle is a specialist feeder on tamarisks, feeding only on plants of the tamarisk family, Tamaricaceae. In laboratory and field cage studies, the larger tamarisk beetle will also feed and complete development on Frankenia shrubs, distant relatives of tamarisks in the same plant order Caryophyllales, but larger tamarisk beetle greatly prefer to lay eggs upon tamarisk.

== Life cycle ==
The larger tamarisk beetle overwinters as adults on the ground. Adults become active and begin feeding and mating in the early spring when tamarisk leaves are budding. Eggs are laid on tamarisk leaves and bark and hatch in about a week in warm weather. Three larval stages feed on tamarisk leaves for about two and a half weeks when they crawl to the ground and spend about 5 days as a C-shaped inactive prepupa before pupating about one week. Adults emerge from pupae to complete the life cycle in about 4–5 weeks in the summer. Five generations of larger tamarisk beetle occur through spring and fall in central Texas. Similar to the northern tamarisk beetle, adults begin to enter diapause in the late summer and early fall, ceasing reproduction and feeding to build fat bodies before seeking a protected place to overwinter. Larvae and adults are sensitive to shorter daylengths as the summer progresses that signal the coming of winter and induce diapause. Robert Bartelt and Allard Cossé (USDA-ARS, Peoria, Illinois) found that male larger tamarisk beetle emit a putative aggregation pheromone, similar to that found in Diorhabda carinulata, that could serve to attract both males and females to certain tamarisk trees.

== Biological control agent ==
The larger tamarisk beetle is currently weakly established as a biological control agent for tamarisk in west Texas. Populations of larger tamarisk beetle from around 39°N latitude near Qarshi, Uzbekistan were initially released by the USDA Agricultural Research Service in west Texas in 2006. By 2008, the larger tamarisk beetle had defoliated about 0.2 hectares of tamarisk near Seymour, Texas. The larger tamarisk beetle may be better adapted to warm temperate grassland and desert habitats of west Texas than other Old World tamarisk beetles that are being introduced, such as the Mediterranean tamarisk beetle, Diorhabda elongata. The northern tamarisk beetle, Diorhabda carinulata, is probably better adapted to northern cold deserts in North America where it is widely established, and the subtropical tamarisk beetle, Diorhabda sublineata, may be better adapted to subtropical deserts.

Tamarisk does not usually die from a single defoliation from tamarisk beetles, and it can resprout within several weeks of defoliation. Repeated defoliation of individual tamarisk trees can lead to severe dieback the next season and death of the tree within several years. Tamarisk beetle defoliation over the course of at least one to several years can severely reduce the nonstructural carbohydrate reserves in the root crowns of tamarisk. Biological control of tamarisk by the larger tamarisk beetle will not eradicate tamarisk but it has the potential to suppress tamarisk populations by 75–85%, after which both larger tamarisk beetle and tamarisk populations should reach equilibrium at lower levels.

A primary objective of tamarisk biological control with the larger tamarisk beetle is to reduce competition by exotic tamarisk with a variety of native riparian flora, including trees (willows, cottonwoods, and honey mesquite), shrubs (wolfberry, saltbush, and baccharis), and grasses (alkali sacaton, saltgrass, and vinemesquite). Unlike expensive chemical and mechanical controls of tamarisk that often must be repeated, tamarisk biological control does not harm native flora and is self-sustaining in the environment. Recovery of native riparian grasses can be quite rapid under the once closed canopy of repeatedly defoliated tamarisk. However, tamarisk beetle defoliation can locally reduce nesting habitat for riparian woodland birds until native woodland flora are able to return. In some areas, tamarisk may be replaced by grasslands or shrublands, resulting in losses of riparian forest habitats for birds (Tracy and DeLoach 1999). Releases of tamarisk beetles in southern California, Arizona, and along the Rio Grande in western New Mexico, are currently delayed until concerns can be resolved regarding safety of tamarisk biological control to nesting habitats of the federally endangered southwestern willow flycatcher, Empidonax traillii Audubon subspecies extimus Phillips, which will nest in tamarisk.
