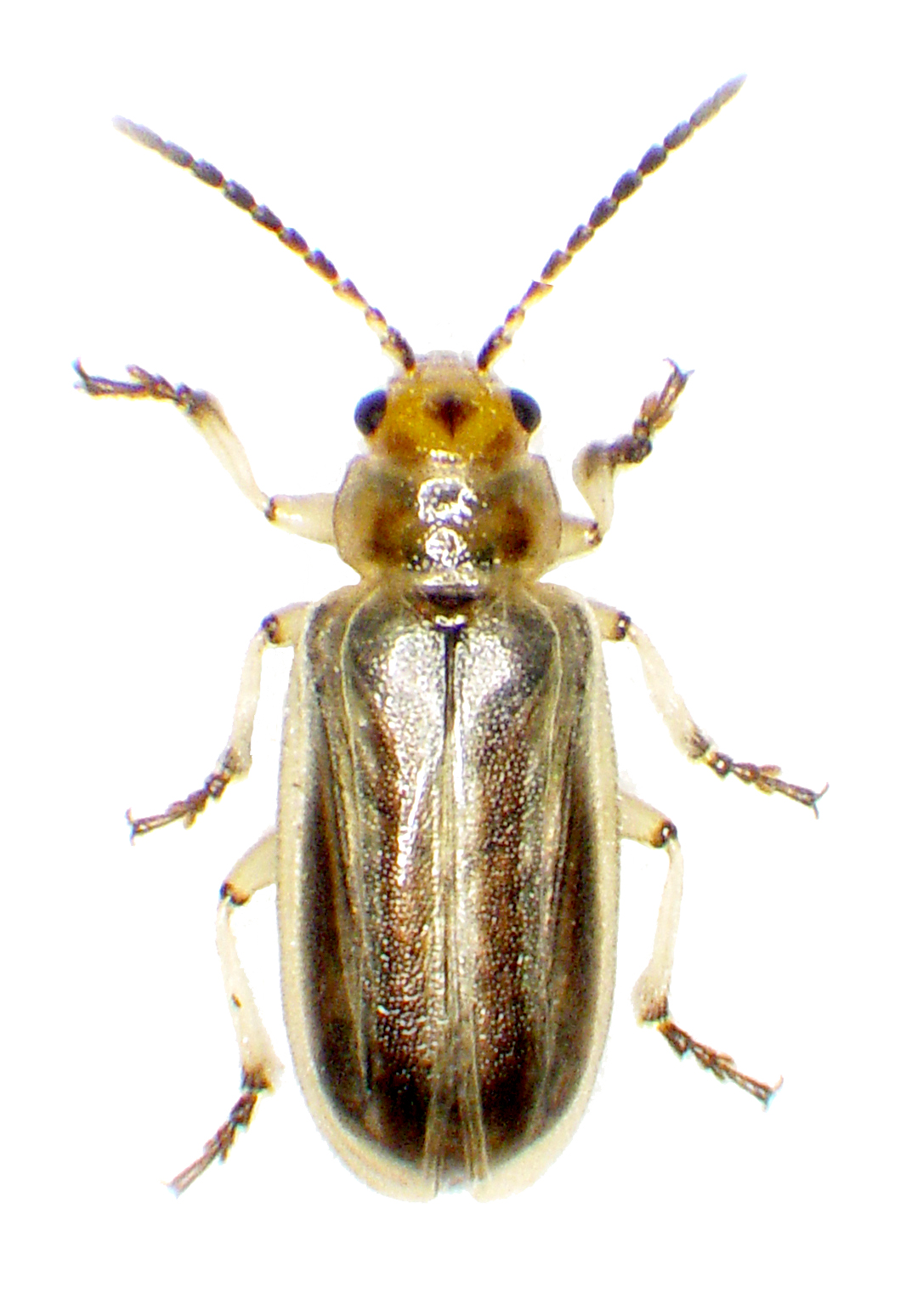

Scientific classification
- Kingdom: Animalia
- Phylum: Arthropoda
- Clade: Pancrustacea
- Class: Insecta
- Order: Coleoptera
- Suborder: Polyphaga
- Infraorder: Cucujiformia
- Family: Chrysomelidae
- Genus: Diorhabda
- Species: D. carinulata

Binomial name
- Diorhabda carinulata Desbrochers, 1870

Synonyms
- Diorhabda koltzei ab. basicornis Laboissière, 1935; Diorhabda elongata deserticola Chen, 1961; Diorhabda deserticola Chen, 1961

= Diorhabda carinulata =

Species of beetle

Diorhabda carinulata is a species of leaf beetle known as the northern tamarisk beetle, which feeds on tamarisk trees from southern Russia and Iran to Mongolia and western China. This beetle is used in North America as a biological pest control agent against saltcedar or tamarisk (Tamarix spp.), an invasive species in arid and semiarid ecosystems (where D. carinulata and its closely related sibling species are also less accurately referred to as the 'saltcedar beetle', 'saltcedar leaf beetle', 'salt cedar leaf beetle', or 'tamarisk leaf beetle').

== Taxonomy ==
The northern tamarisk beetle was first described from southern Russia as Galeruca carinulata Desbrochers (1870). Weise (1893) created the genus Diorhabda and erroneously placed the northern tamarisk beetle as a junior synonym of a sibling species, the Mediterranean tamarisk beetle, Diorhabda elongata (Brullé). Chen (1961) described the species in western China as a new subspecies Diorhabda elongata deserticola Chen. Yu et al. (1996) proposed the species D. deserticola. Berti and Rapilly (1973) recognized the northern tamarisk beetle as a separate species Diorhabda carinulata (Desbrochers) based on detailed morphology of the endophallus of the male genitalia. Tracy and Robbins (2009) confirmed the findings of Berti and Rapilly (1973), established D. e. deserticola as a junior synonym to D. carinulata, and provided illustrated taxonomic keys separating the northern tamarisk beetle from the four other sibling species of the D. elongata (Brullé) species group: Diorhabda elongata, Diorhabda carinata (Faldermann), Diorhabda sublineata (Lucas), and Diorhabda meridionalis Berti and Rapilly. In literature prior to 2009, D. carinulata was usually referred to as D. elongata, a China/Kazakhstan ecotype of D. elongata (in the US), or D. elongata deserticola.

== Host plants ==
The Extensive literature on the biology and host range of the northern tamarisk beetle in Kazakhstan, China, and Mongolia is found under the names D. elongata and D. e. deserticola. The northern tamarisk beetle is a well-known pest of tamarisk in western China, where in certain years large outbreaks of the beetle can defoliate thousands of acres of tamarisk trees. The species is controlled in western China to protect plantings of tamarisk for windbreaks and soil stabilization. In nature, the northern tamarisk beetle feeds on at least 14 species of tamarisk and the closely related genus Myricaria. All these food plants are restricted to the tamarisk plant family Tamaricaceae. Extensive laboratory host range studies verified it is a specialist feeder only on plants of the tamarisk family. In North America, it prefers T. ramosissima to T. parviflora in the field and this preference is also seen in laboratory studies. In laboratory and field cage studies, the northern tamarisk beetle will also feed and complete development on Frankenia shrubs, distant relatives of tamarisks in the same plant order Caryophyllales which have species native to North America, but they greatly prefer to lay eggs upon tamarisk. Field studies in Nevada confirm the beetle will not significantly attack Frankenia (Dudley and Kazmer 2005).

== Lifecycle ==
The northern tamarisk beetle overwinters as adults on the ground in the leaf litter beneath tamarisk trees. Adults become active and begin feeding and mating in the early spring when tamarisk leaves are budding. Eggs are laid on leaves, and hatch in about a week in warm weather. Three larval stages feed on tamarisk leaves for about two and a half weeks, when they crawl to the ground and spend about five days as a C-shaped inactive prepupa before pupating about one week. Adults emerge from pupae to complete the lifecycle in about 4–5 wk in the summer. (For images of various life stages, see Diorhabda carinulata at commons.) From two to four generations of tamarisk beetles occur through spring and fall in central Asia. In the late summer and early fall, adults begin to enter diapause in which they cease reproduction and feed to build fat bodies before seeking a protected place to overwinter beneath the tamarisk. Larvae and adults are sensitive to shorter day lengths as the summer progresses that signal the coming of winter and induces diapause. Cossé et al. (2005) identified an aggregation pheromone that adult male northern tamarisk beetles can emit to attract both males and females to certain tamarisk trees.

== Biological control agent ==
The northern tamarisk beetle is currently the most successful biological control agent for tamarisk in North America. Populations taken from around 44°N latitude at Fukang, China, and Chilik, Kazakhstan, were initially released by the USDA Agricultural Research Service in 2001. Since its release, the insect has defoliated tens of thousands of acres of tamarisk in Nevada, Utah, Colorado, and Wyoming. However, it appears to be poorly adapted to some areas where other species of Old World tamarisk beetles are being introduced, such as the Mediterranean tamarisk beetle, Diorhabda elongata, in northern California and parts of West Texas, and the larger tamarisk beetle, Diorhabda carinata (Faldermann), and the subtropical tamarisk beetle, Diorhabda sublineata (Lucas), in parts of West Texas.

Tamarisk does not usually die from a single defoliation from tamarisk beetles, and it can resprout within several weeks of defoliation. Repeated defoliation of individual tamarisk trees can lead to severe dieback the next season and death of the tree within several years. Tamarisk beetle defoliation over the course of at least one to several years can severely reduce the nonstructural carbohydrate reserves in the root crowns of tamarisk. Biological control of tamarisk by the northern tamarisk beetle will not eradicate tamarisk, but it has the potential to suppress by 75–85%, after which both northern tamarisk beetle and tamarisk populations should reach equilibrium at lower levels.

A primary objective of tamarisk biological control with the northern tamarisk beetle is to reduce competition by exotic tamarisk with a variety of native riparian flora, including trees (willows, cottonwoods, and honey mesquite), shrubs (wolfberry, saltbush, and baccharis), and grasses (alkali sacaton, saltgrass, and creeping and basin wild ryes). Unlike expensive chemical and mechanical controls of tamarisk that often must be repeated, biological control does not harm native flora and is self-sustaining in the environment. Recovery of native riparian grasses can be quite rapid under the once-closed canopy of repeatedly defoliated tamarisk. However, beetle defoliation can locally reduce nesting habitat for riparian woodland birds until the native woodland flora is able to return. In some areas, tamarisk may be replaced by grasslands or shrublands, resulting in losses of riparian forest habitats for birds. Releases of tamarisk beetles in southern California, Arizona, and along the Rio Grande in western New Mexico, are currently delayed until concerns can be resolved regarding safety of tamarisk biological control to nesting habitats of the federally endangered southwestern willow flycatcher (Empidonax traillii extimus), which will nest in tamarisk. The northern tamarisk beetle has defoliated some tamarisk nest trees of the southwestern willow flycatcher on the Virgin River in southern Utah, and actions to protect the flycatcher are under consideration. In 2010, the USDA Animal and Plant Health Inspection Service (APHIS) officially discontinued its program for release of the beetle in 13 northwestern states over concern for the flycatcher. The Colorado Department of Agriculture is continuing to redistribute beetles within their state, and they are seeing vigorous growth of native vegetation such as willows in response to reductions in tamarisk by the northern tamarisk beetle.
