= Tamarix leptopetala =

Scientific classification
- Kingdom: Plantae
- Clade: Tracheophytes
- Clade: Angiosperms
- Clade: Eudicots
- Order: Caryophyllales
- Family: Tamaricaceae
- Genus: Tamarix
- Species: T. leptopetala

Binomial name
- Tamarix leptopetala Bunge.

Species of plant

Tamarix leptopetala is a species of tree in the family Tamaricaceae. It is native to Iran and Turkmenistan and the Transcaucasus.

== Sources ==
This article incorporates text from a free content work. Licensed under CC0 (license statement/permission). Text taken from Tamarix kotschyi. Encyclopedia of Life.
