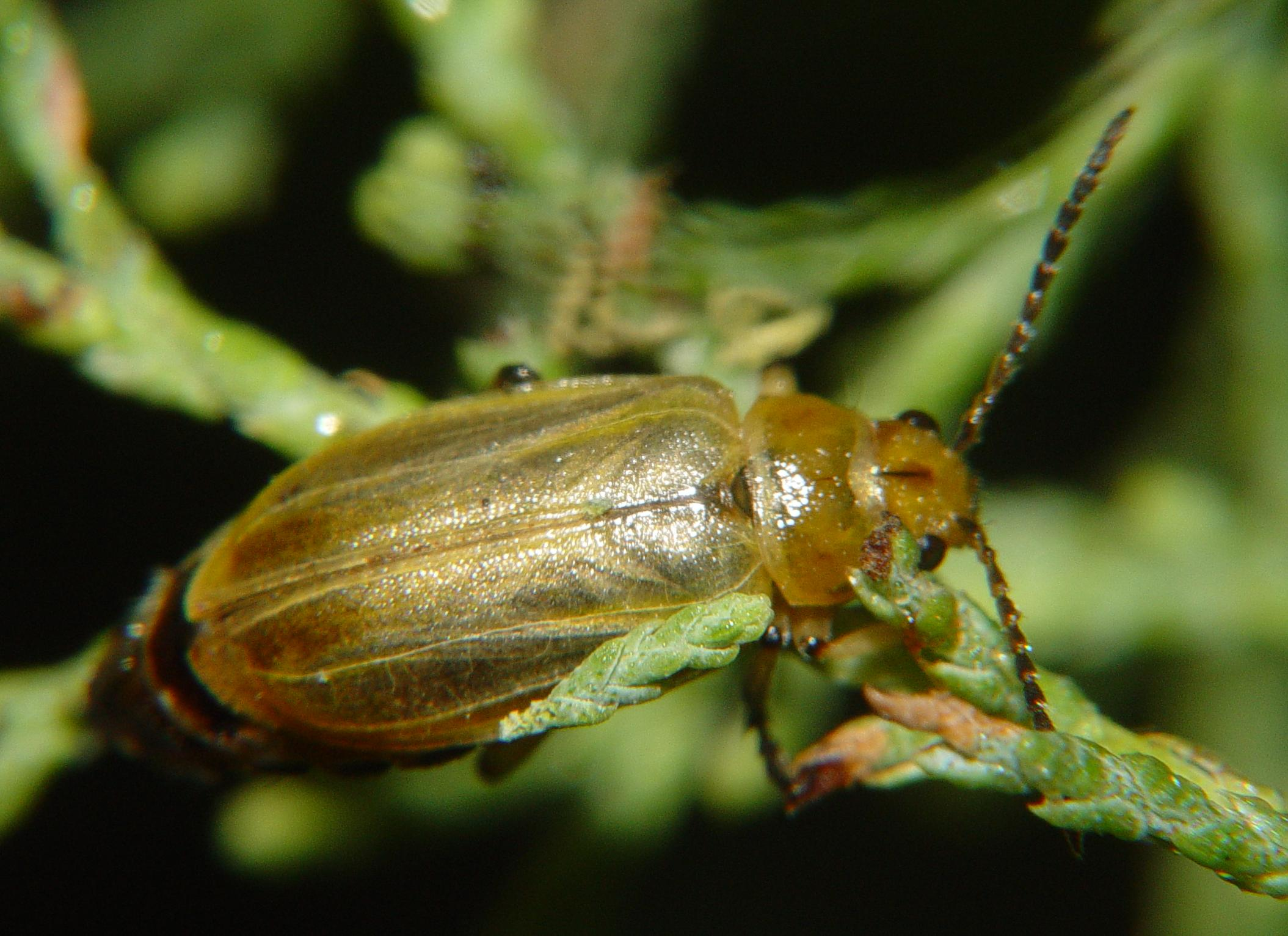

Scientific classification
- Kingdom: Animalia
- Phylum: Arthropoda
- Clade: Pancrustacea
- Class: Insecta
- Order: Coleoptera
- Suborder: Polyphaga
- Infraorder: Cucujiformia
- Family: Chrysomelidae
- Genus: Diorhabda
- Species: D. elongata

Binomial name
- Diorhabda elongata Brullé, 1832

Synonyms
- Galeruca elongata Brullé, 1832; Galeruca costalis Mulsant, 1852

= Diorhabda elongata =

Species of beetle

Diorhabda elongata is a species of leaf beetle known as the Mediterranean tamarisk beetle (MTB) which feeds on tamarisk trees from Portugal and Algeria east to southern Russia. The MTB is used in North America as a biological pest control agent against saltcedar or tamarisk (Tamarix spp.), an invasive species in arid and semi-arid ecosystems (where the MTB and its closely related sibling species are also less accurately referred to as the 'saltcedar beetle', 'saltcedar leaf beetle', 'salt cedar leaf beetle', or 'tamarisk leaf beetle') (Tracy and Robbins 2009).

== Taxonomy ==
The MTB was first described from the Pelopónnisos peninsula of Greece as Galeruca elongata Brullé (1832). Mulsant (Mulsant and Wachanru 1852) found the MTB in southwestern Turkey and described it as Galeruca costalis Mulsant. Reiche and Saulcy (1858) properly synonymized G. costalis under G. elongata, but erroneously placed two sibling species of tamarisk beetles, G. carinata Faldermann (1837) (the larger tamarisk beetle, Diorhabda carinata) and G. sublineata Lucas (1849) (the subtropical tamarisk beetle, Diorhabda sublineata) as junior synonyms of G. elongata. Weise (1893) created the genus Diorhabda and erroneously placed the sibling species G. carinulata Desbrochers (1870) (the northern tamarisk beetle, Diorhabda carinulata) as a junior synonym of Diorhabda elongata. Berti and Rapilly (1973) recognized D. carinata and D. carinulata as separate species from one another, and, by implication, as separate species from D. elongata, based on detailed morphology of the endophallus of the male genitalia. Tracy and Robbins (2009) confirmed the findings of Berti and Rapilly (1973), characterized the male and female genitalia of D. elongata, recognized D. sublineata as a separate species from D. elongata, and provided illustrated taxonomic keys separating the MTB from the four other sibling species of the D. elongata (Brullé) species group: Diorhabda carinata, Diorhabda sublineata, Diorhabda carinulata, and Diorhabda meridionalis Berti and Rapilly. In literature prior to 2009, D. carinata, D. sublineata, and D. carinulata were usually also referred to as D. elongata, or subspecies of D. elongata.

== Host plants ==
Field collections in Eurasia reveal that the MTB feeds on at least four species of tamarisks, including Tamarix parviflora, invasive in California, and T. smyrnensis, a close relative of T. ramosissima which is widely invasive in western North America. The MTB will defoliate entire tamarisk trees in southern Bulgaria (Tracy and Robbins 2009). Extensive laboratory host range studies verified that MTB is a specialist feeder on tamarisks, feeding only on plants of the tamarisk family, Tamaricaceae. In laboratory and field cage studies, the MTB will also feed and complete development on Frankenia shrubs, distant relatives of tamarisks in the same plant order Caryophyllales, but the MTB greatly prefer to lay eggs upon tamarisk (Milbrath and DeLoach 2006). Field studies in Texas confirm that the MTB will not significantly attack Frankenia (Moran et al. 2009).

== Life cycle ==
The MTB overwinters as adults on the ground. Adults become active and begin feeding and mating in the early spring when tamarisk leaves are budding. Eggs are laid on tamarisk leaves and hatch in about a week in warm weather. Three larval stages feed on tamarisk leaves for about two and a half weeks when they crawl to the ground and spend about 5 days as a C-shaped inactive prepupa before pupating about one week. Adults emerge from pupae to complete the life cycle in about 4–5 weeks in the summer. (For images of various life stages of a related species, see Diorhabda carinulata at commons) Five generations of MTB occur through spring and fall in central Texas (Milbrath et al. 2007, Tracy and Robbins 2009). Similar to the northern tamarisk beetle, adults begin to enter diapause in the late summer and early fall, ceasing reproduction and feeding to build fat bodies before seeking a protected place to overwinter (Lewis et al. 2003). Larvae and adults are sensitive to shorter daylengths as the summer progresses that signal the coming of winter and induce diapause (Bean et al. in prep.). Robert Bartelt and Allard Cossé (USDA-ARS, Peoria, Illinois) found that male MTB emit a putative aggregation pheromone, similar to that found in Diorhabda carinulata (Cossé et al. 2005), that could serve to attract both males and females to certain tamarisk trees.

== Biological control agent ==
The MTB is currently the most successful biological control agent for tamarisk in west Texas. Populations of MTB from around 35°N latitude near Sfakaki, Crete, Greece were initially released by the USDA Agricultural Research Service in west Texas and northern California in 2003. By 2008, the MTB had defoliated over 140 hectares in Texas and 250 hectares in California. However, the MTB may not be as well adapted to interior desert and grassland habitats of south and west Texas as three other species of Old World tamarisk beetles that are being introduced, the larger tamarisk beetle (Diorhabda carinata), in north Texas, the subtropical tamarisk beetle (Diorhabda sublineata) in south Texas, and the northern tamarisk beetle (Diorhabda carinulata) in extreme northern Texas. The southern tamarisk beetle, (Diorhabda meridionalis) has not been introduced into North America, but may be best adapted to subtropical maritime desert habitats (Tracy and Robbins 2009).

Tamarisk does not usually die from a single defoliation from tamarisk beetles, and it can resprout within several weeks of defoliation. Repeated defoliation of individual tamarisk trees can lead to severe dieback the next season and death of the tree within several years (DeLoach and Carruthers 2004). Tamarisk beetle defoliation over the course of at least one to several years can severely reduce the nonstructural carbohydrate reserves in the root crowns of tamarisk (Hudgeons et al. 2007). Biological control of tamarisk by the MTB will not eradicate tamarisk but it has the potential to suppress tamarisk populations by 75–85%, after which both MTB and tamarisk populations should reach equilibrium at lower levels (DeLoach and Carruthers 2004, Tracy and DeLoach 1999).

A primary objective of tamarisk biological control with the MTB is to reduce competition by exotic tamarisk with a variety of native riparian flora, including trees (willows, cottonwoods, and honey mesquite), shrubs (wolfberry, saltbush, and baccharis), and grasses (alkali sacaton, saltgrass, and vinemesquite). Unlike expensive chemical and mechanical controls of tamarisk that often must be repeated, tamarisk biological control does not harm native flora and is self-sustaining in the environment. Recovery of native riparian grasses can be quite rapid under the once closed canopy of repeatedly defoliated tamarisk. However, tamarisk beetle defoliation can locally reduce nesting habitat for riparian woodland birds until native woodland flora are able to return. In some areas, tamarisk may be replaced by grasslands or shrublands, resulting in losses of riparian forest habitats for birds (Tracy and DeLoach 1999). Releases of tamarisk beetles in southern California, Arizona, and along the Rio Grande in western New Mexico, are currently delayed until concerns can be resolved regarding safety of tamarisk biological control to nesting habitats of the federally endangered southwestern willow flycatcher, Empidonax traillii Audubon subspecies extimus Phillips, which will nest in tamarisk (see DeLoach et al. 2000, Dudley and DeLoach 2004).
