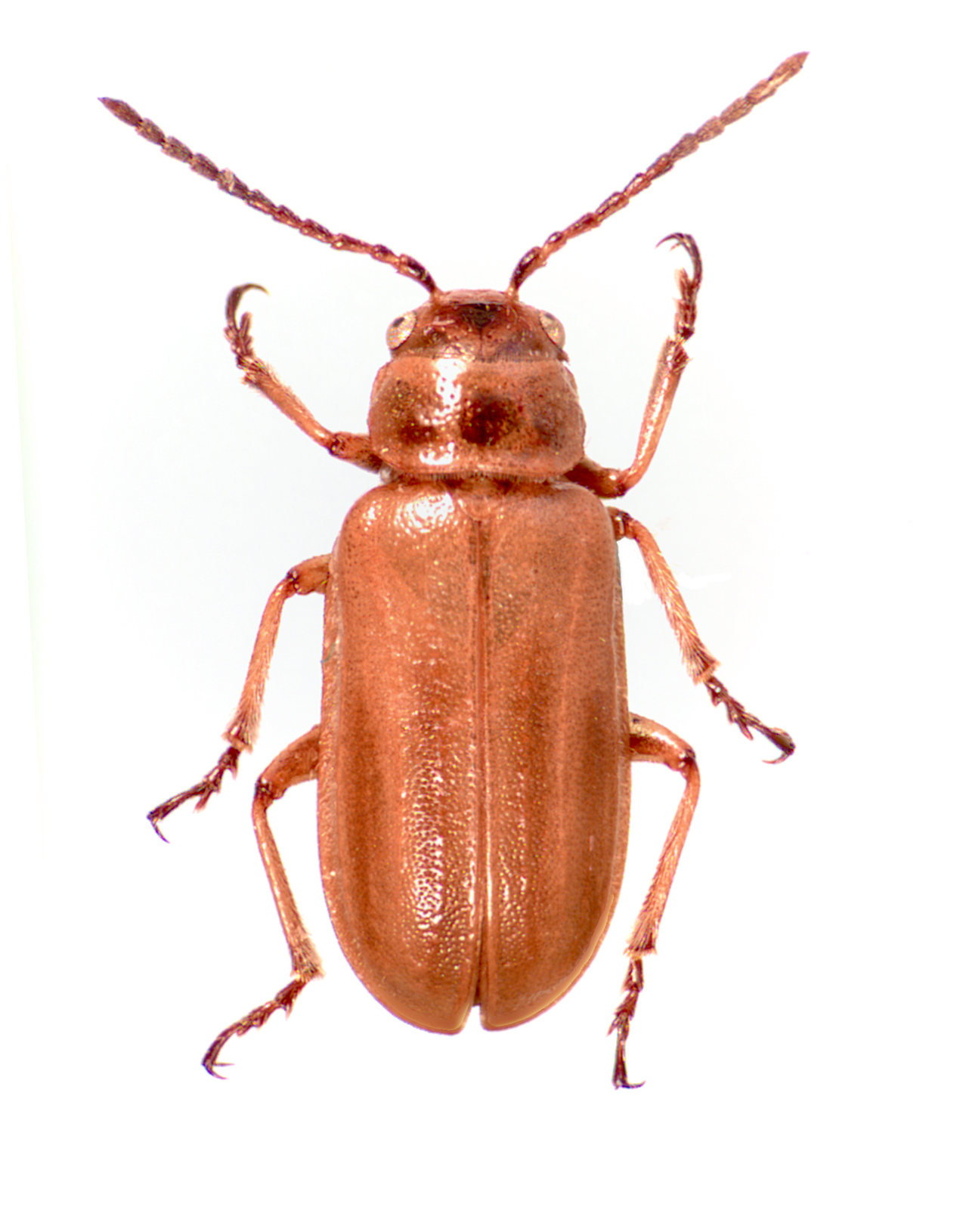

Scientific classification
- Kingdom: Animalia
- Phylum: Arthropoda
- Class: Insecta
- Order: Coleoptera
- Suborder: Polyphaga
- Infraorder: Cucujiformia
- Family: Chrysomelidae
- Genus: Diorhabda
- Species: D. meridionalis

Binomial name
- Diorhabda meridionalis Berti & Rapilly, 1973

Synonyms
- Diorhabda carinulata meridionalis (Berti & Rapilly, 1973)

= Diorhabda meridionalis =

Diorhabda meridionalis Southern Tamarisk Beetle

Species of beetle

Diorhabda meridionalis is a species of leaf beetle known as the southern tamarisk beetle (SoTB) which feeds on tamarisk trees from Syria to western and southern Iran and southern Pakistan. The SoTB may have potential for use in North America as a biological pest control agent against saltcedar or tamarisk (Tamarix spp.), an invasive species in arid and semi-arid ecosystems (where it might be less accurately referred to along with its closely related sibling species as the 'saltcedar beetle', 'saltcedar leaf beetle', 'salt cedar leaf beetle', or 'tamarisk leaf beetle') (Tracy and Robbins 2009).

== Taxonomy ==
The SoTB was first described from Minab, Iran as the subspecies Diorhabda carinulata meridionalis Berti and Rapilly (1973). Tracy and Robbins (2009) recognized Diorhabda meridionalis Berti and Rapilly as a separate species from Diorhabda carinulata (Desbrochers) based on comparisons of the male and female genitalia, and provided illustrated taxonomic keys separating the SoTB from the four other sibling species of the D. elongata (Brullé) species group: Diorhabda elongata (Brullé), Diorhabda carinata (Faldermann), Diorhabda sublineata (Lucas), and Diorhabda carinulata. (For additional information, see Wikispecies: Diorhabda meridionalis.)

== Host plants ==
Field collections in Iran reveal that the SoTB feeds on an unidentified species of tamarisk. Further field collections are needed to identify which tamarisk species serve as hosts.

== Life cycle ==
The life cycle of the SoTB has not been studied, but it is probably similar to that of the closely related northern tamarisk beetle, Diorhabda carinulata.

== Biological control agent ==
The SoTB might be able to serve as an effective biological control agent for tamarisk in North America. Laboratory host range studies are needed to verify that SoTB is a specialist feeder on tamarisks. The SoTB may be better adapted to subtropical desert habitats of south and west Texas than other Old World tamarisk beetles that are being introduced, such as the Mediterranean tamarisk beetle, Diorhabda elongata. The northern tamarisk beetle, Diorhabda carinulata, is probably better adapted to northern cold deserts in North America where it is widely established, and the larger tamarisk beetle, Diorhabda carinata, is probably better adapted to warm temperate grasslands and deserts. The subtropical tamarisk beetle, Diorhabda sublineata, is probably better adapted to subtropical Mediterranean and subtropical interior desert habitats (Tracy and Robbins 2009). (See articles on other tamarisk beetles listed above for additional information on biological control.)
