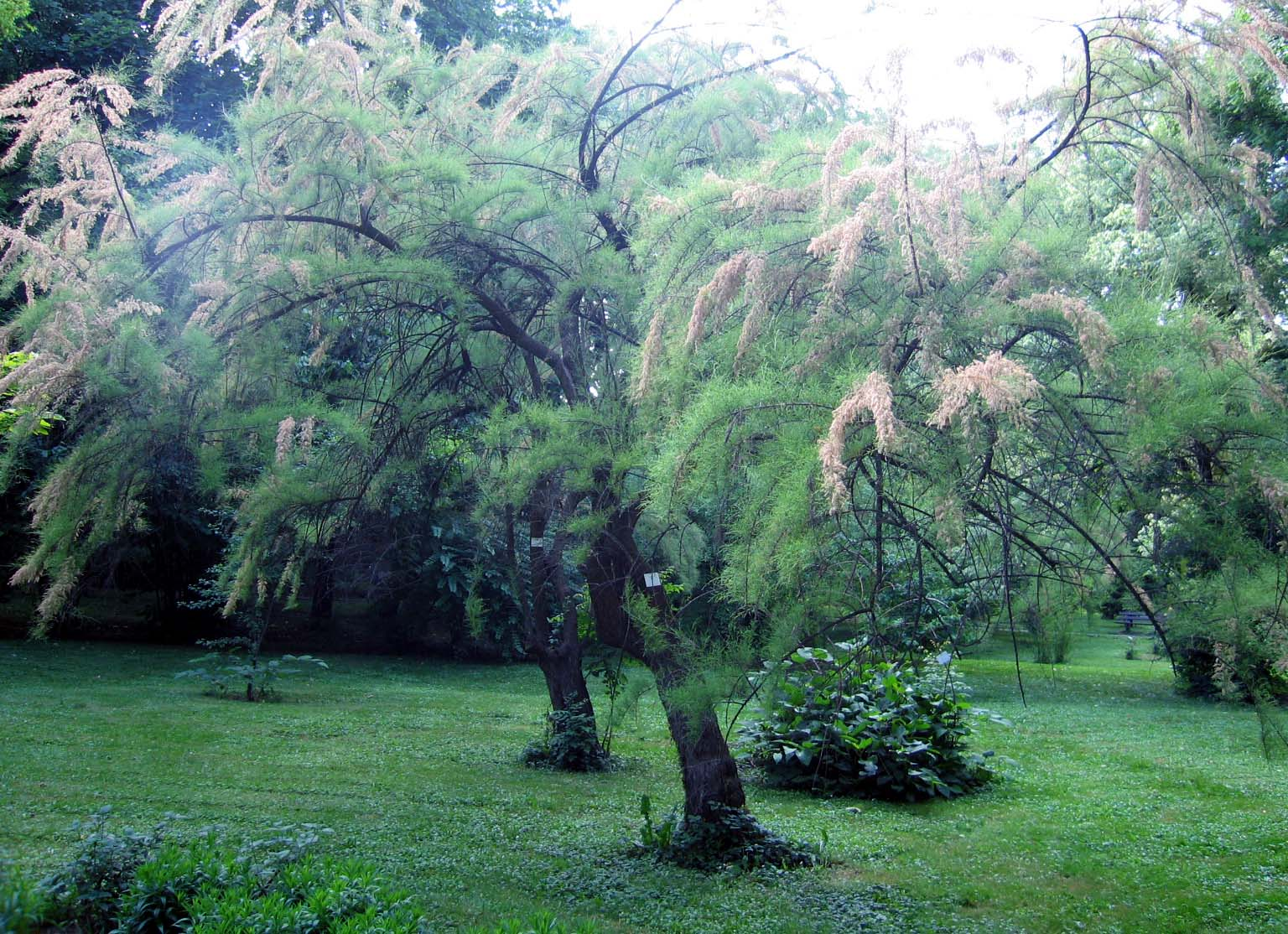

Scientific classification
- Kingdom: Plantae
- Clade: Embryophytes
- Clade: Tracheophytes
- Clade: Spermatophytes
- Clade: Angiosperms
- Clade: Eudicots
- Order: Caryophyllales
- Family: Tamaricaceae
- Genus: Tamarix
- Species: T. tetrandra

Binomial name
- Tamarix tetrandra Pall. ex M.Bieb.

= Tamarix tetrandra =

Species of flowering plant

Tamarix tetrandra is a species of flowering plant in the family Tamaricaceae, native to south eastern Europe, Turkey, Bulgaria and Crimea. Growing to 3 m (10 ft) tall and broad, it is a small deciduous tree with almost black arching branches, and tiny scale-like leaves arranged along the branches. Racemes of pale pink flowers are produced in late spring.

The binomial Tamarix tetrandra means "four-stamen tamarisk".

This plant is particularly associated with temperate coastal areas, but can also be grown inland in a sunny position with protection from winter winds. It has gained the Royal Horticultural Society's Award of Garden Merit.
