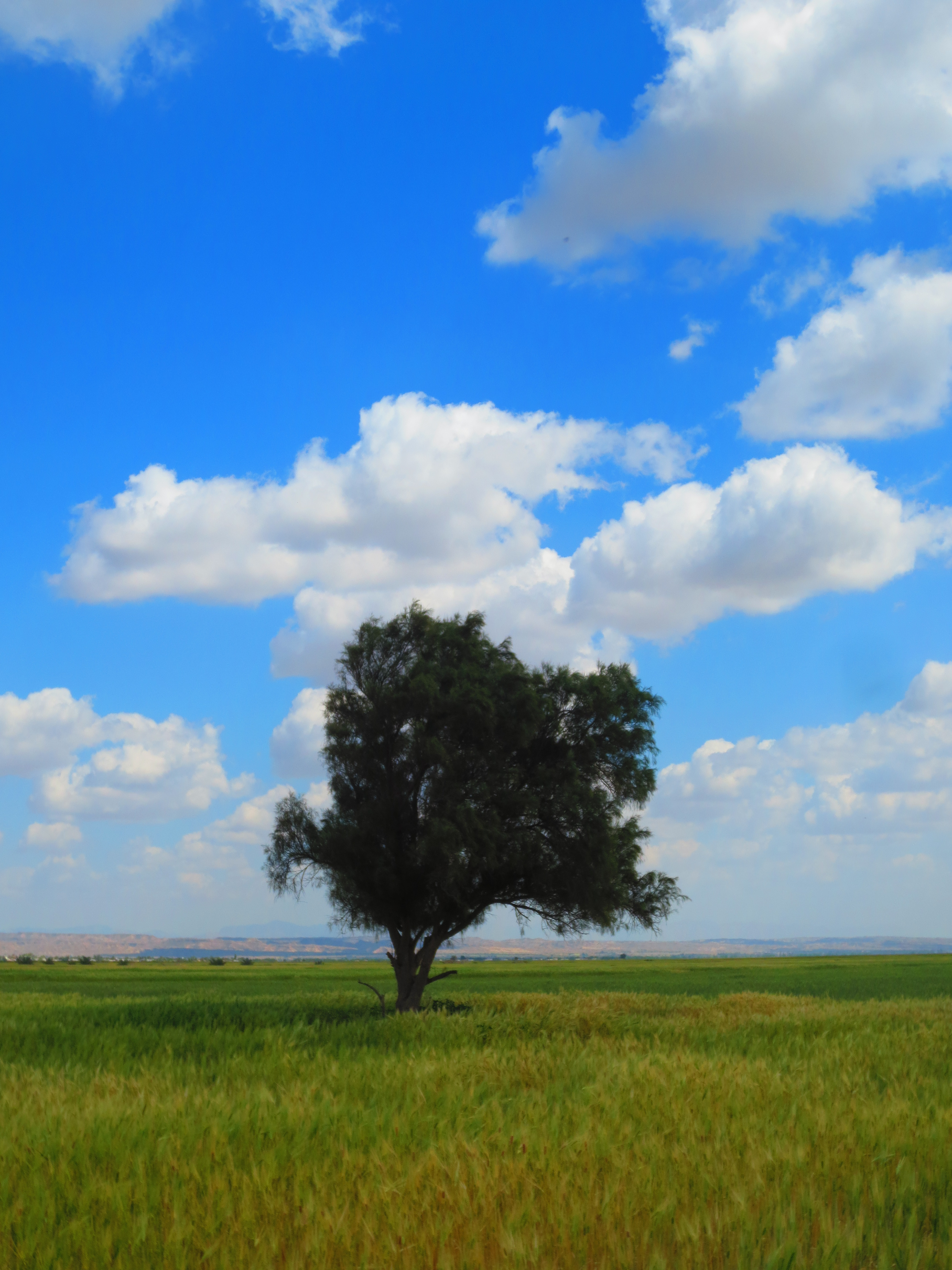

Scientific classification
- Kingdom: Plantae
- Clade: Tracheophytes
- Clade: Angiosperms
- Clade: Eudicots
- Order: Caryophyllales
- Family: Tamaricaceae
- Genus: Tamarix
- Species: T. stricta

Binomial name
- Tamarix stricta Boiss.

= Tamarix stricta =

Species of plant

Tamarix stricta is a species of tree in the family Tamaricaceae. It is native to Iran and Pakistan.

== Sources ==
This article incorporates text from a free content work. Licensed under CC0 (license statement/permission). Text taken from Tamarix stricta. Encyclopedia of Life.
