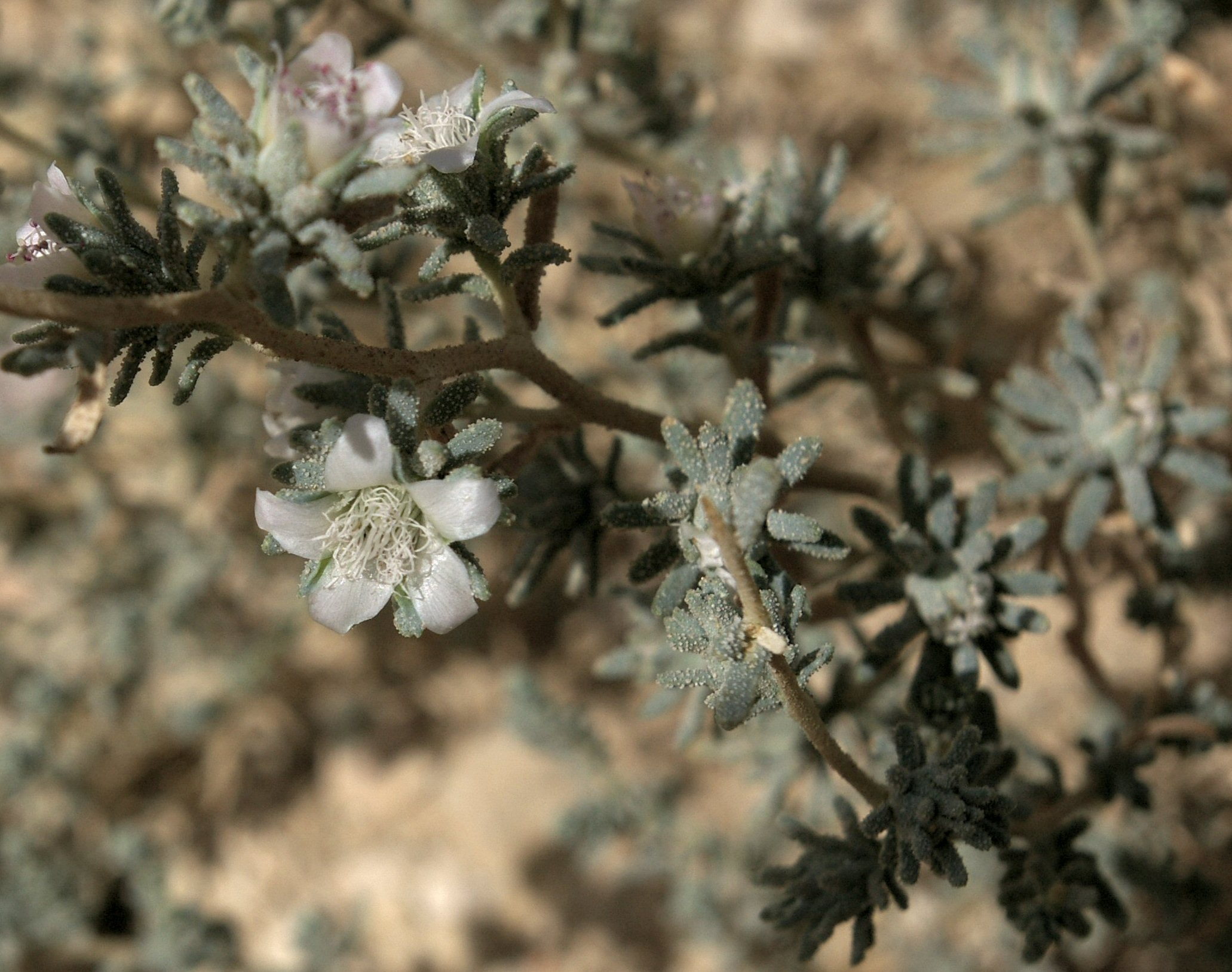
- Reaumuria hirtella

Scientific classification
- Kingdom: Plantae
- Clade: Tracheophytes
- Clade: Angiosperms
- Clade: Eudicots
- Order: Caryophyllales
- Family: Tamaricaceae
- Genus: Reaumuria; L.

Species
- See text

Synonyms
- Beaumulix Willd. ex Poir.; Eichwaldia Ledeb.; Hololachna Ehrenb.; Racletia Adans.

= Reaumuria =

Genus of flowering plants

Reaumuria is a genus of flowering plants in the family Tamaricaceae, found in North Africa, Sicily, Anatolia, the Middle East, the Caucasus, Pakistan, Central Asia, Mongolia, Tibet, and northern China. They tend to be perennial xerophytic and halophytic shrubs or subshrubs.

== Species ==
Currently accepted species include:

- Reaumuria alternifolia (Labill.) Britten
- Reaumuria atreki Botsch. & Zuckerw.
- Reaumuria babataghi Botsch.
- Reaumuria botschantzevii Zuckerw. & Kurbanov
- Reaumuria floyeri S.Moore
- Reaumuria fruticosa Boiss.
- Reaumuria halophila Podlech
- Reaumuria hirtella Jaub. & Spach
- Reaumuria kaschgarica Rupr.
- Reaumuria kermanensis Bornm.
- Reaumuria korovinii Botsch. & Lincz.
- Reaumuria kuznetzovii Sosn. & Manden.
- Reaumuria minfengensis D.F.Cui & M.J.Zhong
- Reaumuria negevensis Zohary & Danin
- Reaumuria oxiana (Ledeb.) Boiss.
- Reaumuria persica (Boiss.) Boiss.
- Reaumuria reflexa Lipsky
- Reaumuria sivasica Kit Tan & Yildiz
- Reaumuria sogdiana Kom.
- Reaumuria songarica (Pall.) Maxim.
- Reaumuria stocksii Boiss.
- Reaumuria tatarica Jaub. & Spach
- Reaumuria trigyna Maxim.
- Reaumuria turkestanica Gorschk.
- Reaumuria vermiculata L.
