= Jules Desbrochers des Loges =

French entomologist

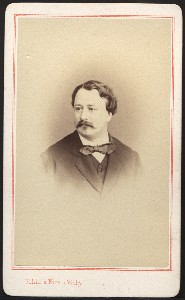
Jules Desbrochers des Loges

Jules Desbrochers des Loges (1836, Béthune, Pas de Calais-10 August 1913, Tours) was a French entomologist.

Desbrochers was an insect dealer at first based in Vitry-aux-Loges (1880–1887), then from 1888 in Tours. He described many species including the biological pest control agent Northern Tamarisk Beetle.

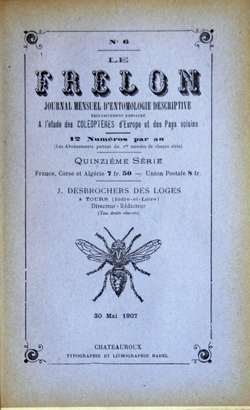
Le Frelon

== Works ==
Partial list

- 1870 Descriptions de Coléoptères nouveaux d’Europe et confins. L’Abeille, Volume 7, Part 1: 10–135.
- 1881 Insectes coléoptères du nord de l’Afrique nouveaux ou peuconnus. Premier mémoire. Ténébrionides.Bulletin de l’Académie d’Hippone, 16: 51–168.
- 1893. Révision des espèces de curculionides appartenant à la tribu des Gymnetridae d’Europe et circa. Le Frelon, 2 (10-11): 1–18.
- 1893 Révision des espèces de curculionides appartenant à la tribu des Gymnetridae d’Europe et circa. Le Frelon, 2 (12): 19-36
- 1893 Révision des espèces de curculionides appartenant à la tribu des Gymnetridae d’Europe et circa. Le Frelon, 3 (1-2): 37-68
