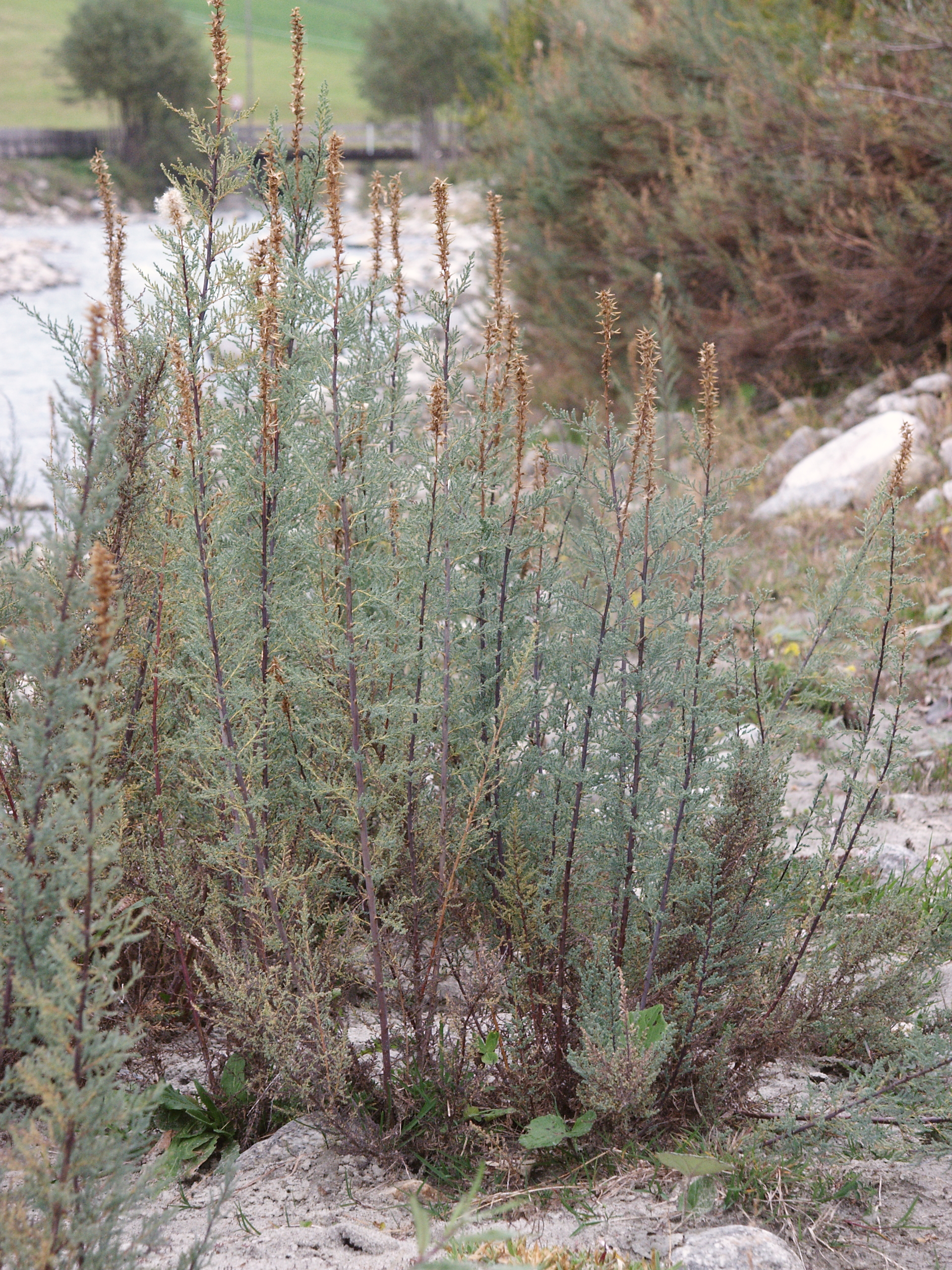
- On a riverbank
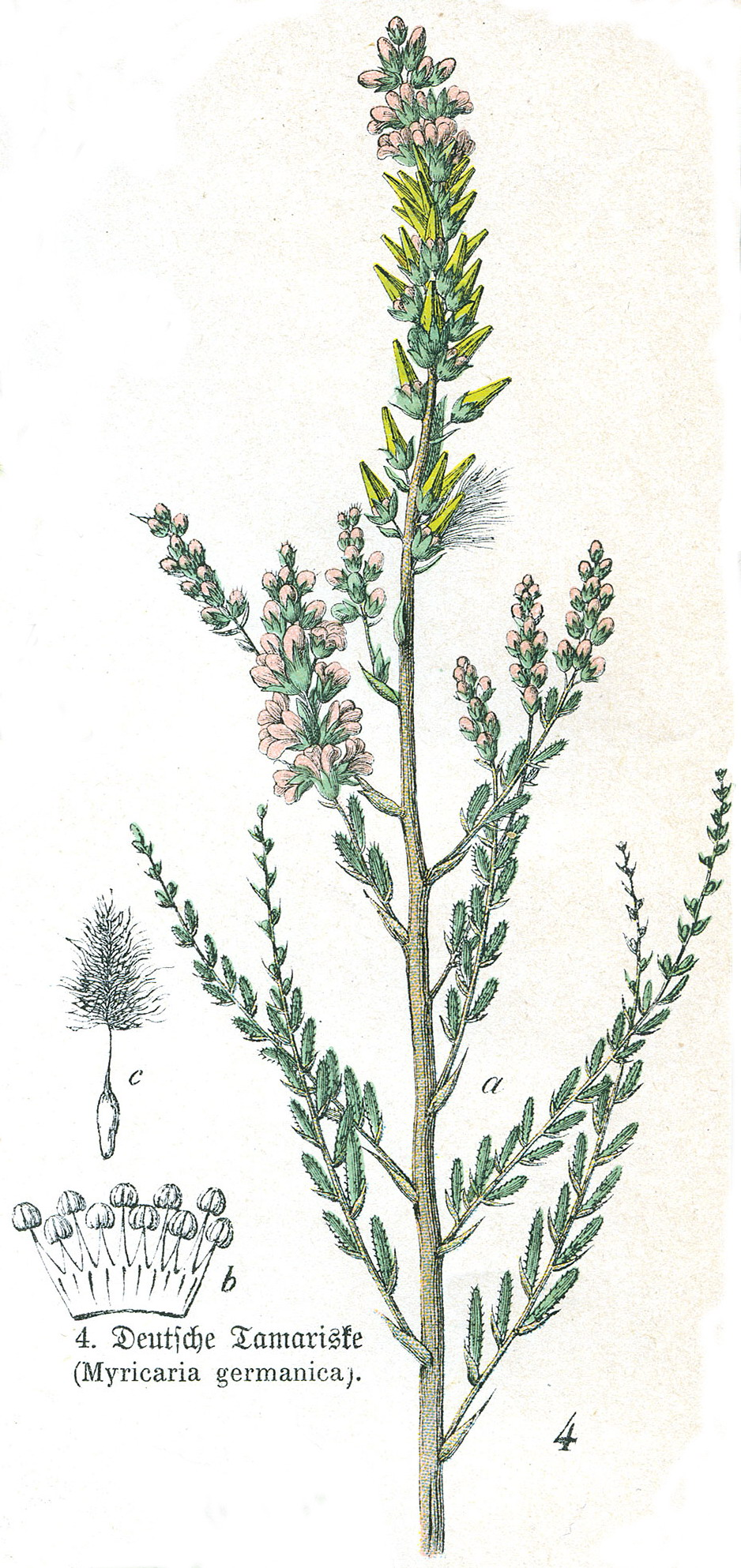
- Botanical illustration

Scientific classification
- Kingdom: Plantae
- Clade: Embryophytes
- Clade: Tracheophytes
- Clade: Angiosperms
- Clade: Eudicots
- Order: Caryophyllales
- Family: Tamaricaceae
- Genus: Myricaria
- Species: M. germanica

Binomial name
- Myricaria germanica (L.) Desv.

Synonyms
- List: Myrica pannonica Bubani; Myricaria herbacea Desv.; Tamariscus decander Lam.; Tamariscus germanicus (L.) Scop.; Tamarix decandra Salisb.; Tamarix germanica L.; Tamarix herbacea Willd.; Tamarix monogyna Stokes; Tamarix squamosa Steud.

= Myricaria germanica =

Species of flowering plant

Myricaria germanica, the German tamarisk, is a species of flowering plant in the family Tamaricaceae. It is native to continental Europe including Scandinavia, the Black Sea region, Iran, Afghanistan, and Pakistan. An erect shrub reaching at most 8 ft (2.4 m), it is a pioneer species adapted to recently scoured riverbanks in mountainous regions. It has been cultivated in Great Britain since 1582.

== Subtaxa ==
The following subspecies are accepted:

- Myricaria germanica subsp. germanica – entire range, except Pakistan
- Myricaria germanica subsp. pakistanica Qaiser – Pakistan
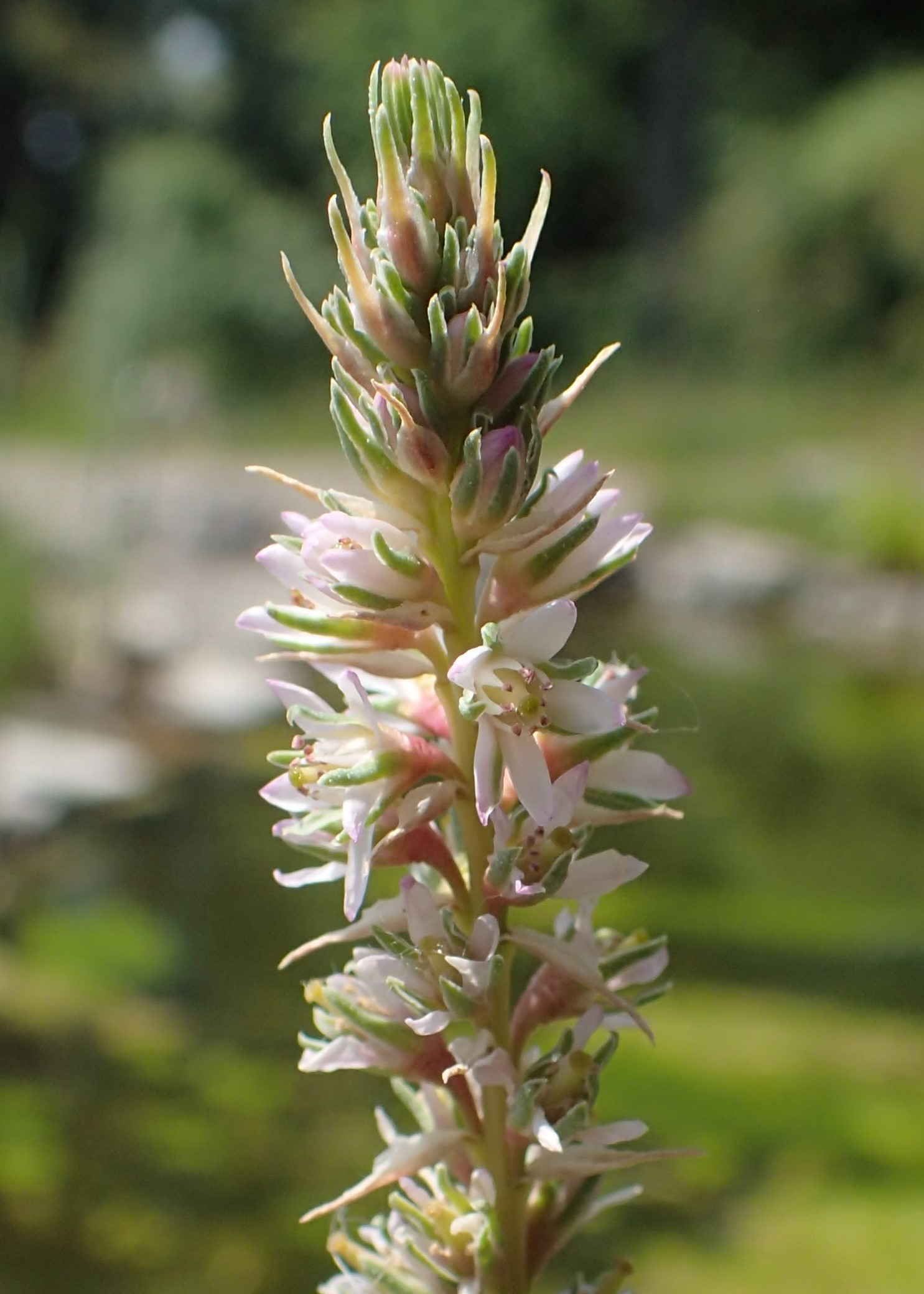
Close-up of flower spike

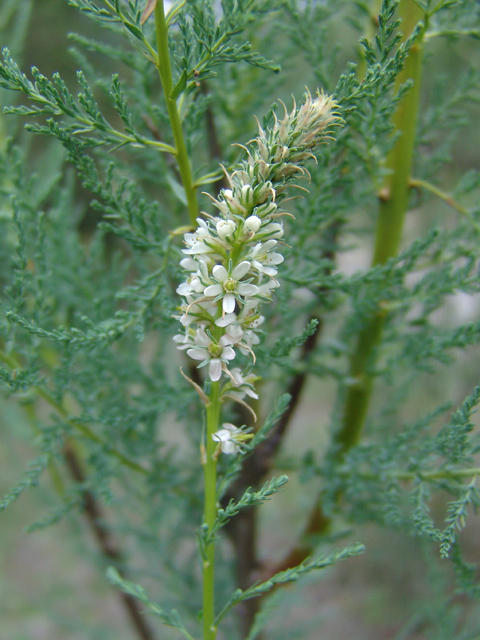
Flowers can be white, cream, or pink

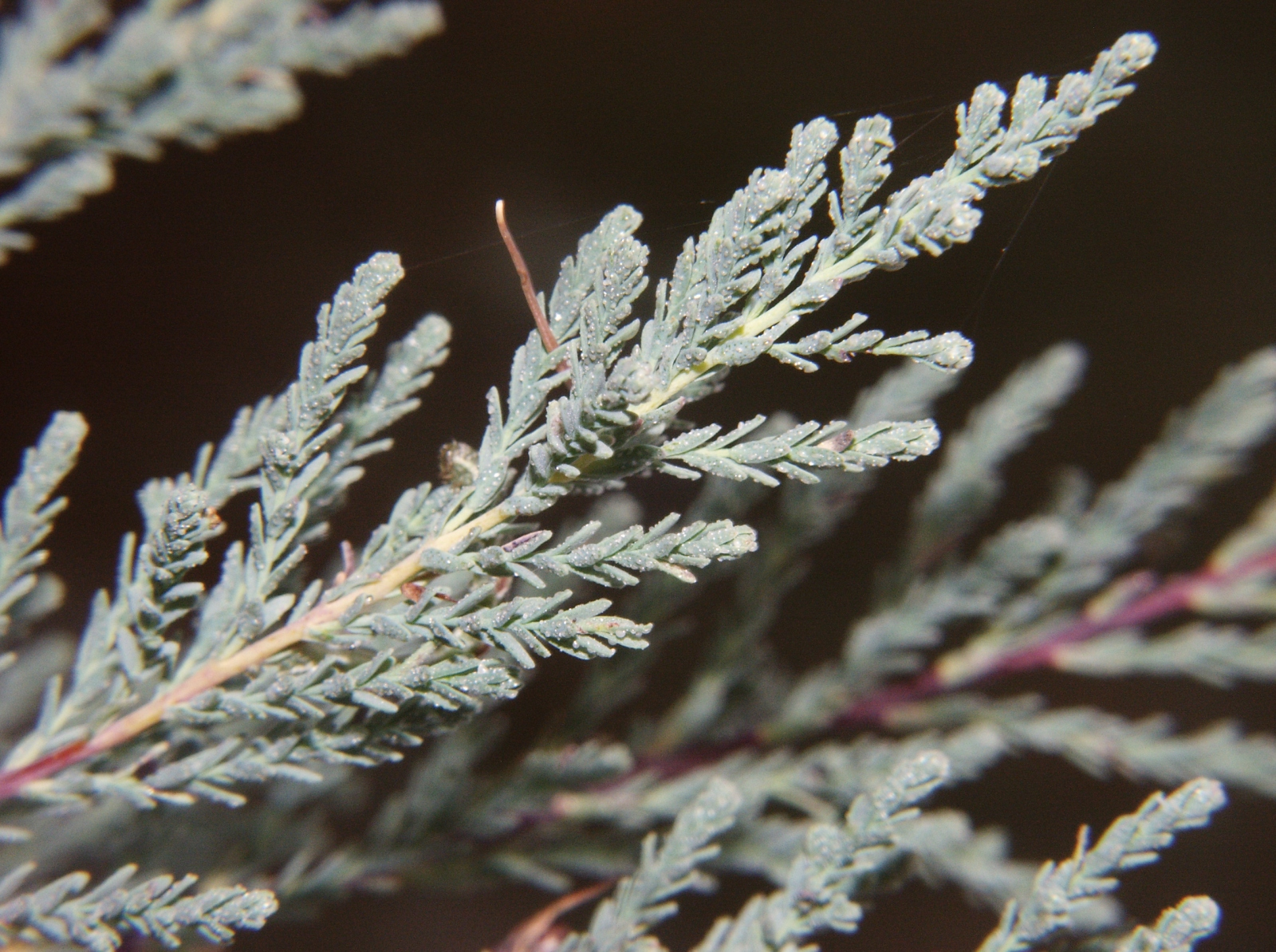
Close-up of leaves

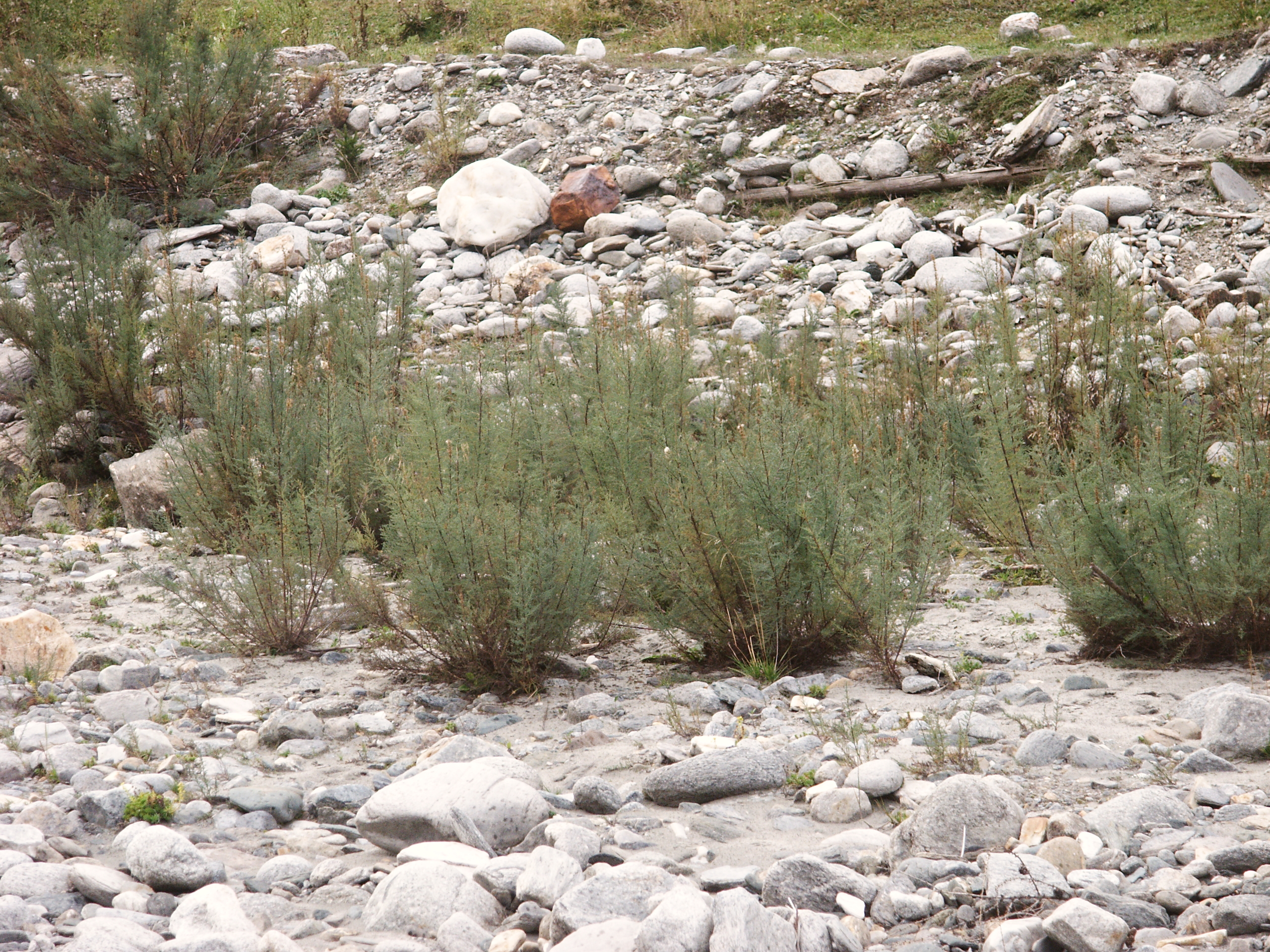
A stand in Tyrol, Italy

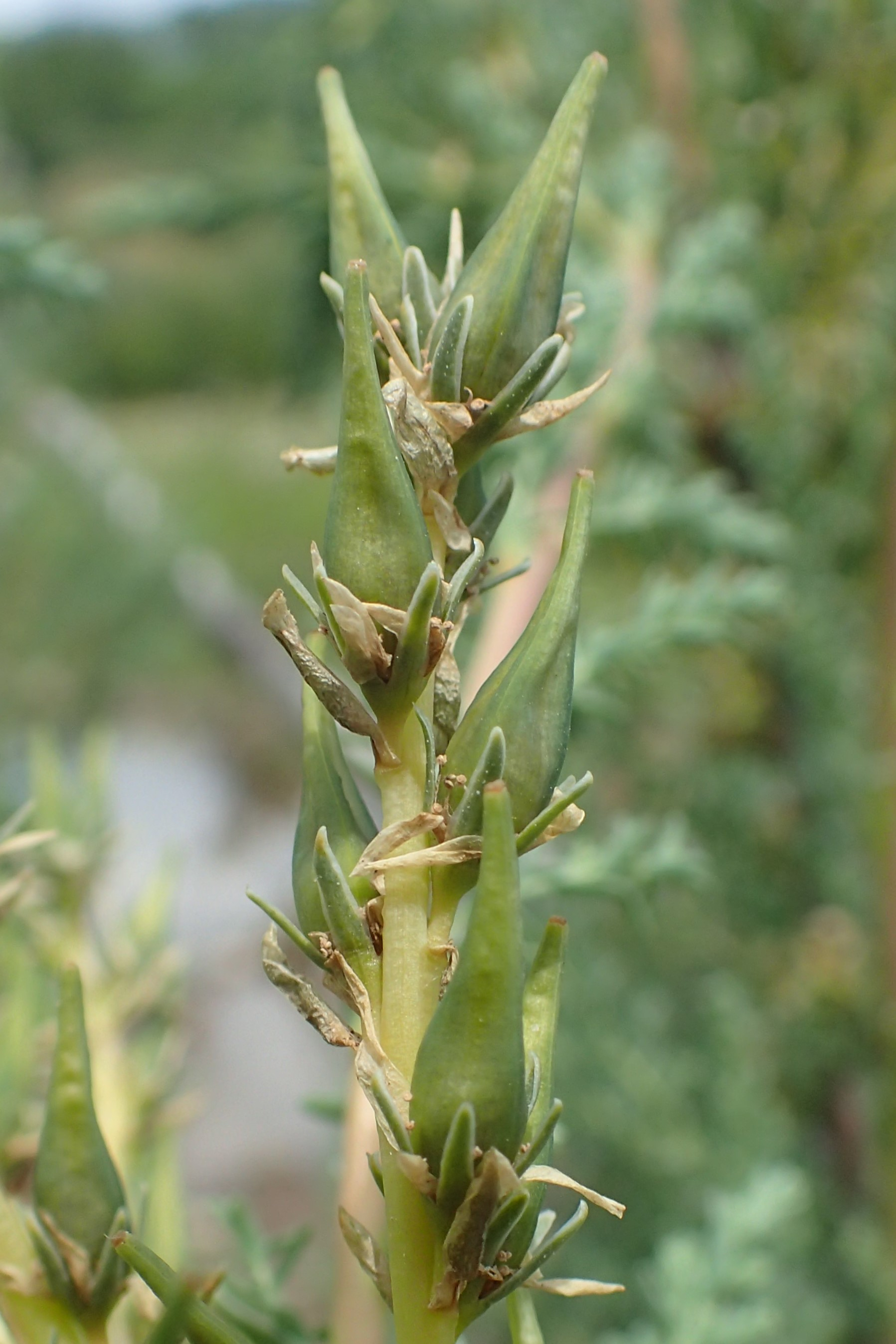
Seed capsules

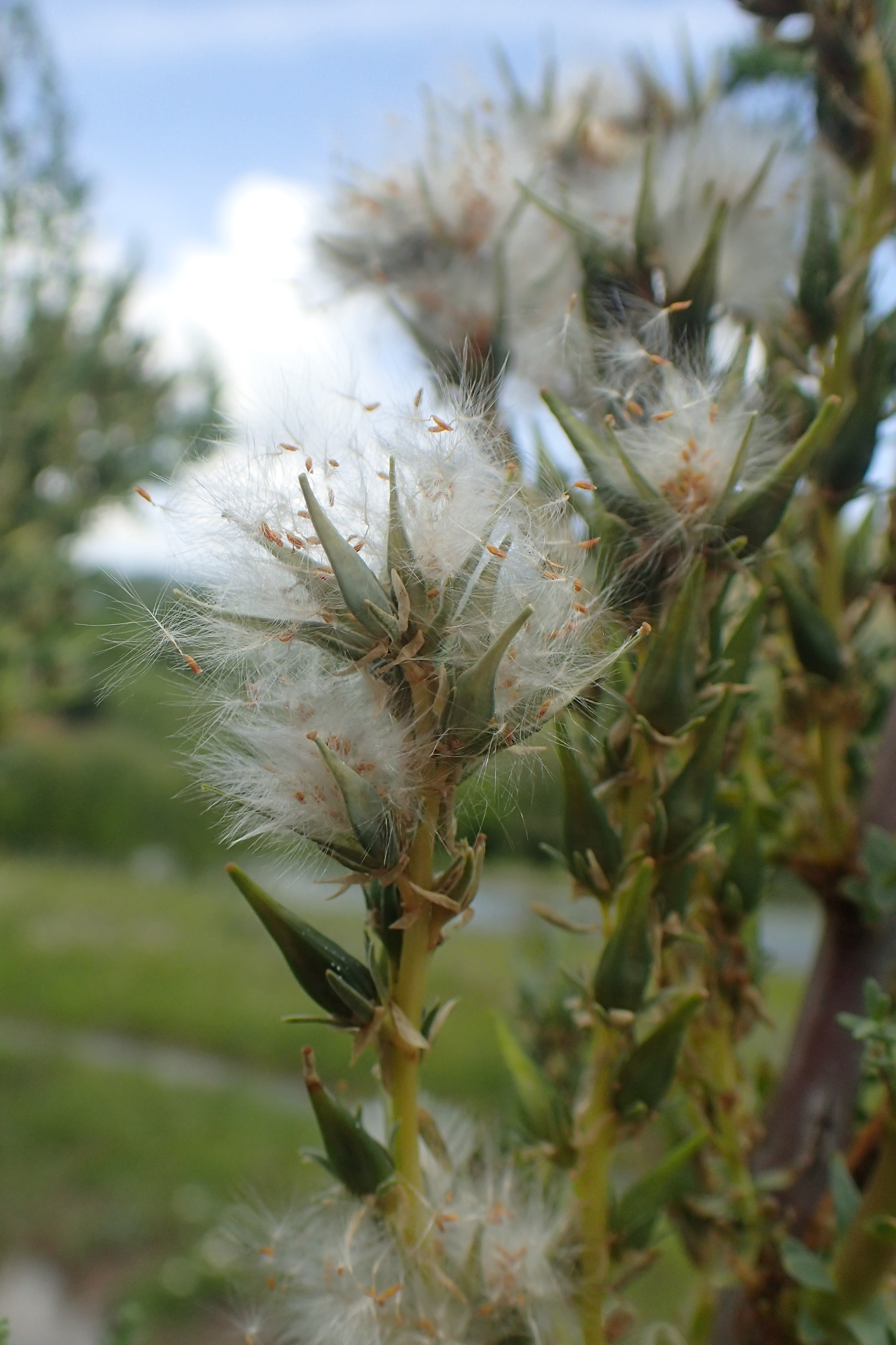
Seed pods opening

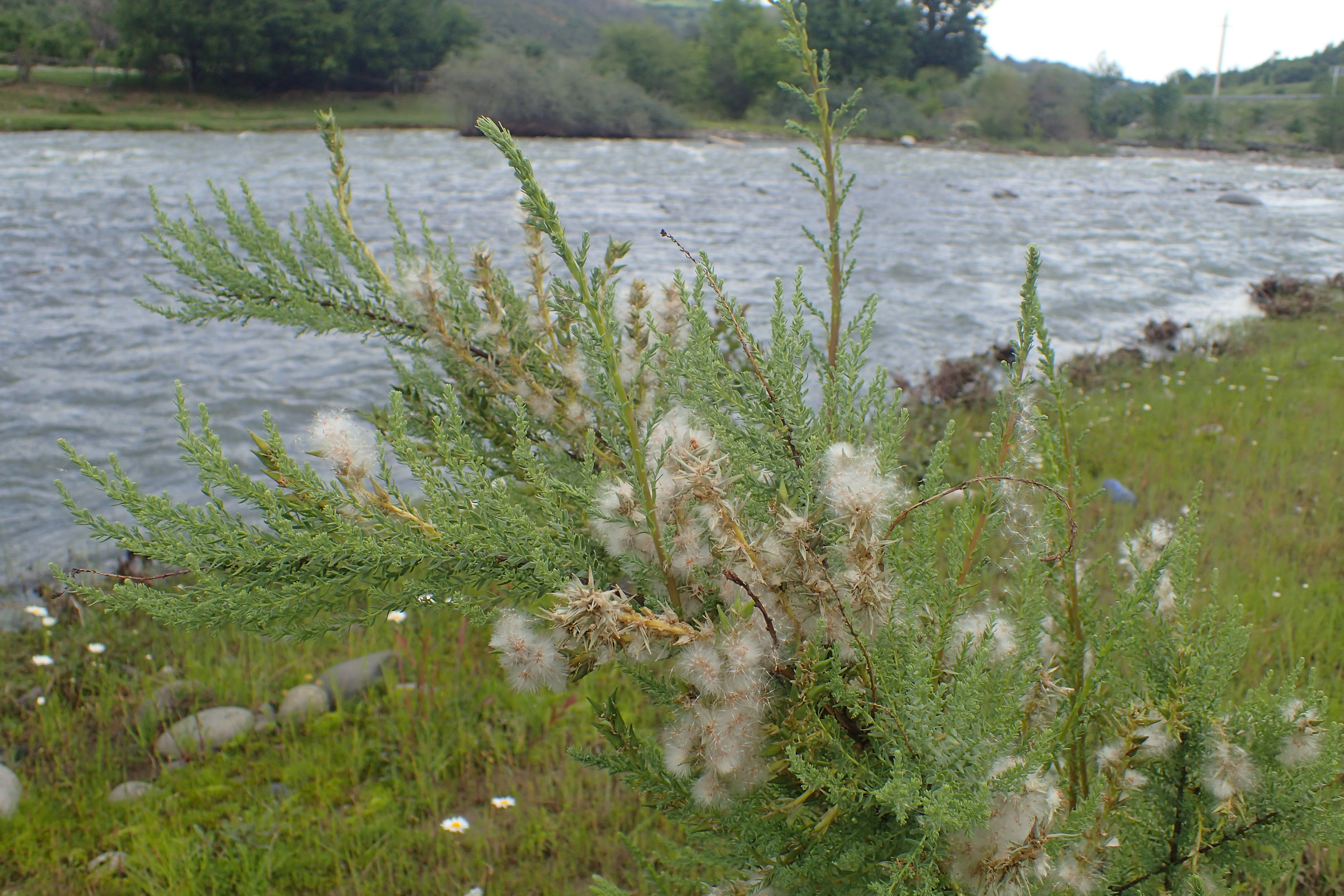
On the banks of a river north of Tbilisi, Georgia

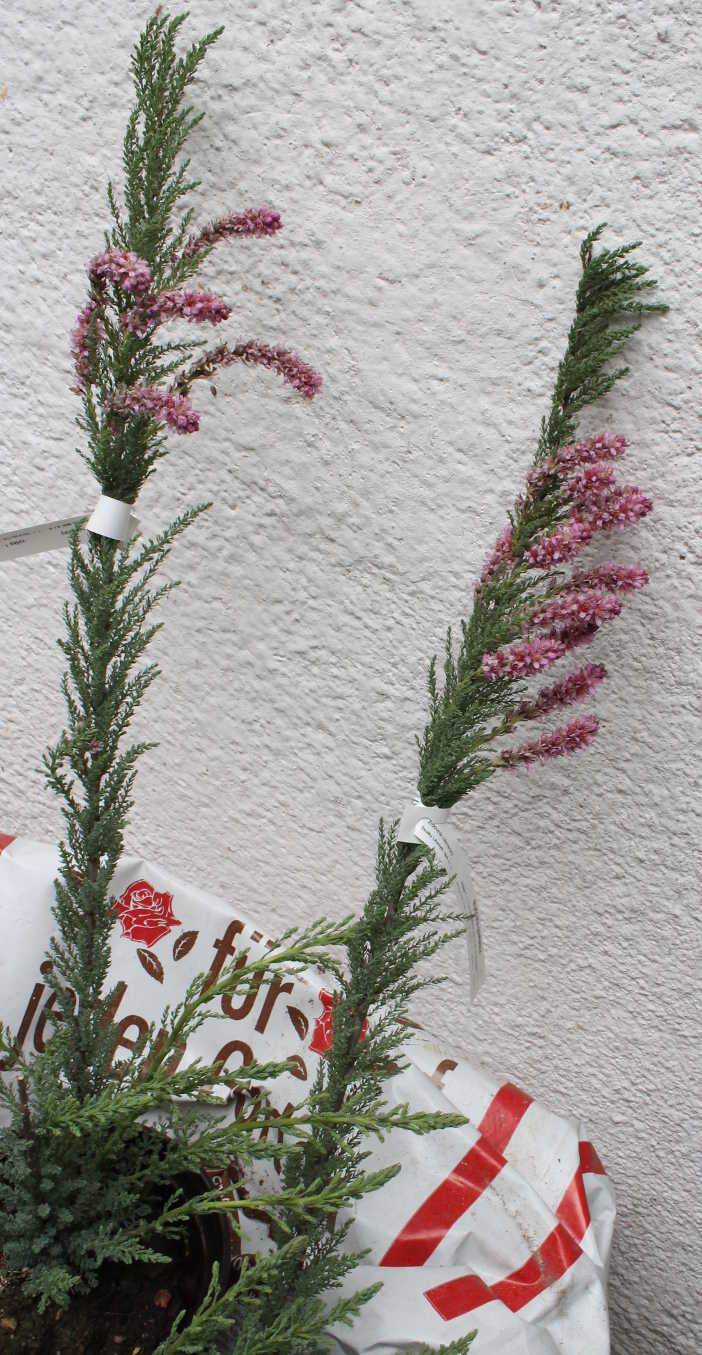
Pink-flowered individuals for sale
