= Myrtama =

Scientific classification
- Kingdom: Plantae
- Clade: Tracheophytes
- Clade: Angiosperms
- Clade: Eudicots
- Order: Caryophyllales
- Family: Tamaricaceae
- Genus: Myrtama; Ovcz. & Kinzik. (1977)
- Species: M. elegans

Binomial name
- Myrtama elegans (Royle) Ovcz. & Kinzik. (1977)

Synonyms
- Tamaricaria Qaiser & Ali (1978); Myricaria elegans Royle (1835); Myricaria elegans var. tsetangensis P.Y.Zhang & Y.J.Zhang (1984); Tamaricaria elegans (Royle) Qaiser & Ali (1978); Tamarix ladachensis B.R.Baum (1966)

Genus of flowering plants

Myrtama elegans is a species of flowering plant in the tamarisk family, Tamaricaceae, and is the sole species in genus Myrtama. It is a shrub or tree native to subalpine areas of Pakistan, Tajikistan, Tibet, the western Himalayas of India, and Xinjiang.
