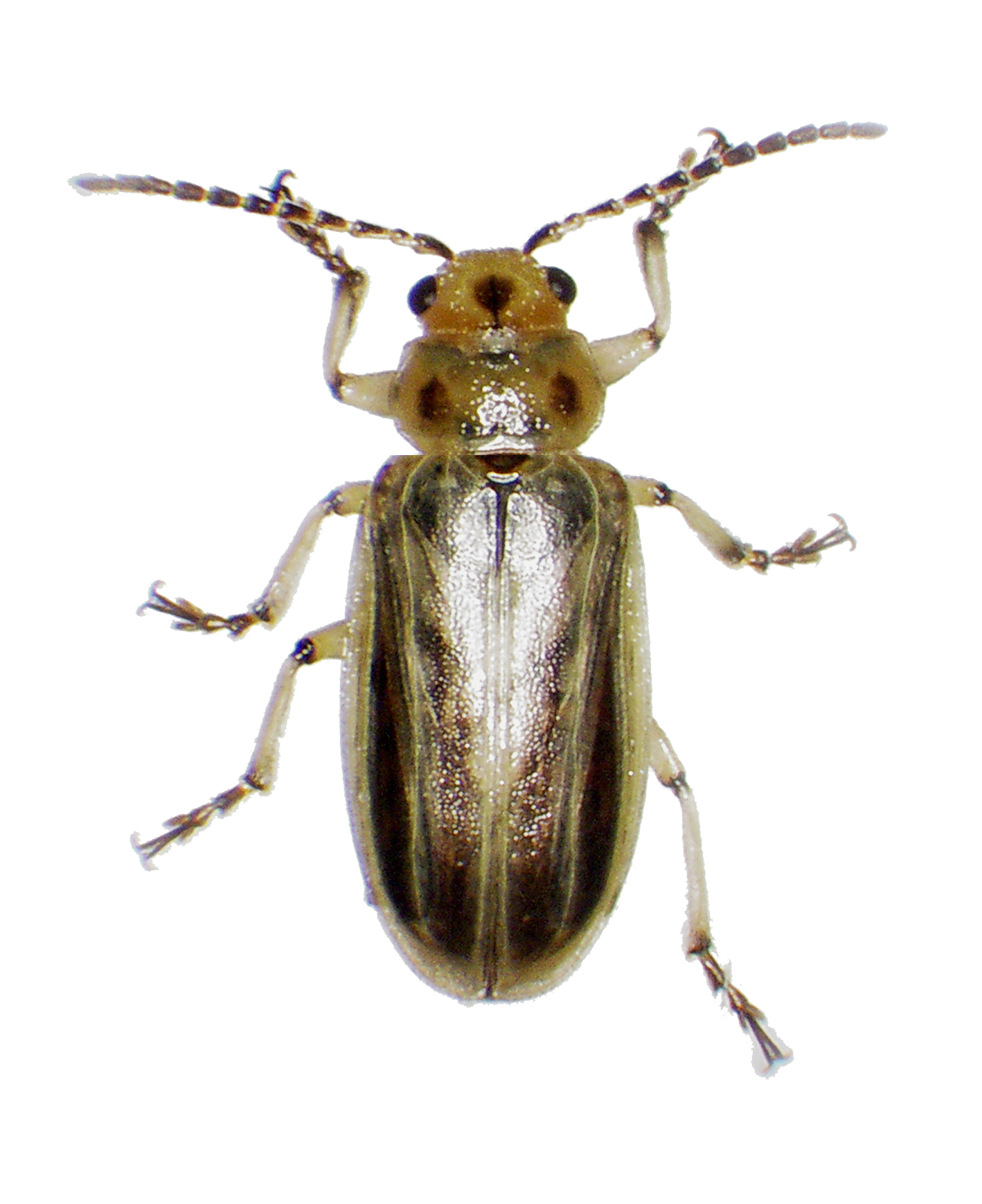
- Diorhabda sublineata

Scientific classification
- Kingdom: Animalia
- Phylum: Arthropoda
- Clade: Pancrustacea
- Class: Insecta
- Order: Coleoptera
- Suborder: Polyphaga
- Infraorder: Cucujiformia
- Family: Chrysomelidae
- Subfamily: Galerucinae
- Tribe: Galerucini
- Genus: Diorhabda; Weise, 1883

= Diorhabda =

Genus of leaf beetles

Diorhabda is a genus of beetles in the family Chrysomelidae. The beetles feed on Tamarix (tamarisk or saltcedar) The genus is native to Europe and Asia, but several species have been intentionally introduced to North America as biological control agents for Tamarix. Common names include tamarisk beetle and saltcedar leaf beetle.

== Species ==
- Diorhabda brevicornis Jacoby, 1889
- Diorhabda carinulata (Desbrochers, 1869)
- Diorhabda elongata (Brullé, 1832)
- Diorhabda fischeri (Faldermann, 1837)
- Diorhabda inconspicua (Jacoby, 1894)
- Diorhabda koltzei (Weise, 1900)
- Diorhabda lusca Maulik, 1936
- Diorhabda meridionalis Berti & Rapilly, 1973
- Diorhabda nigrifrons (Laboissiere, 1914)
- Diorhabda octocostata Gahan, 1896
- Diorhabda persica (Faldermann, 1837)
- Diorhabda rickmersi (Weise, 1900)
- Diorhabda robusta (Jacoby, 1899)
- Diorhabda rybakowi (Weise, 1890)
- Diorhabda sublineata (Lucas, 1849)
- Diorhabda tarsalis (Weise, 1889)
- Diorhabda trirakha (Maulik, 1936)
- Diorhabda yulensis (Jacoby, 1886)
