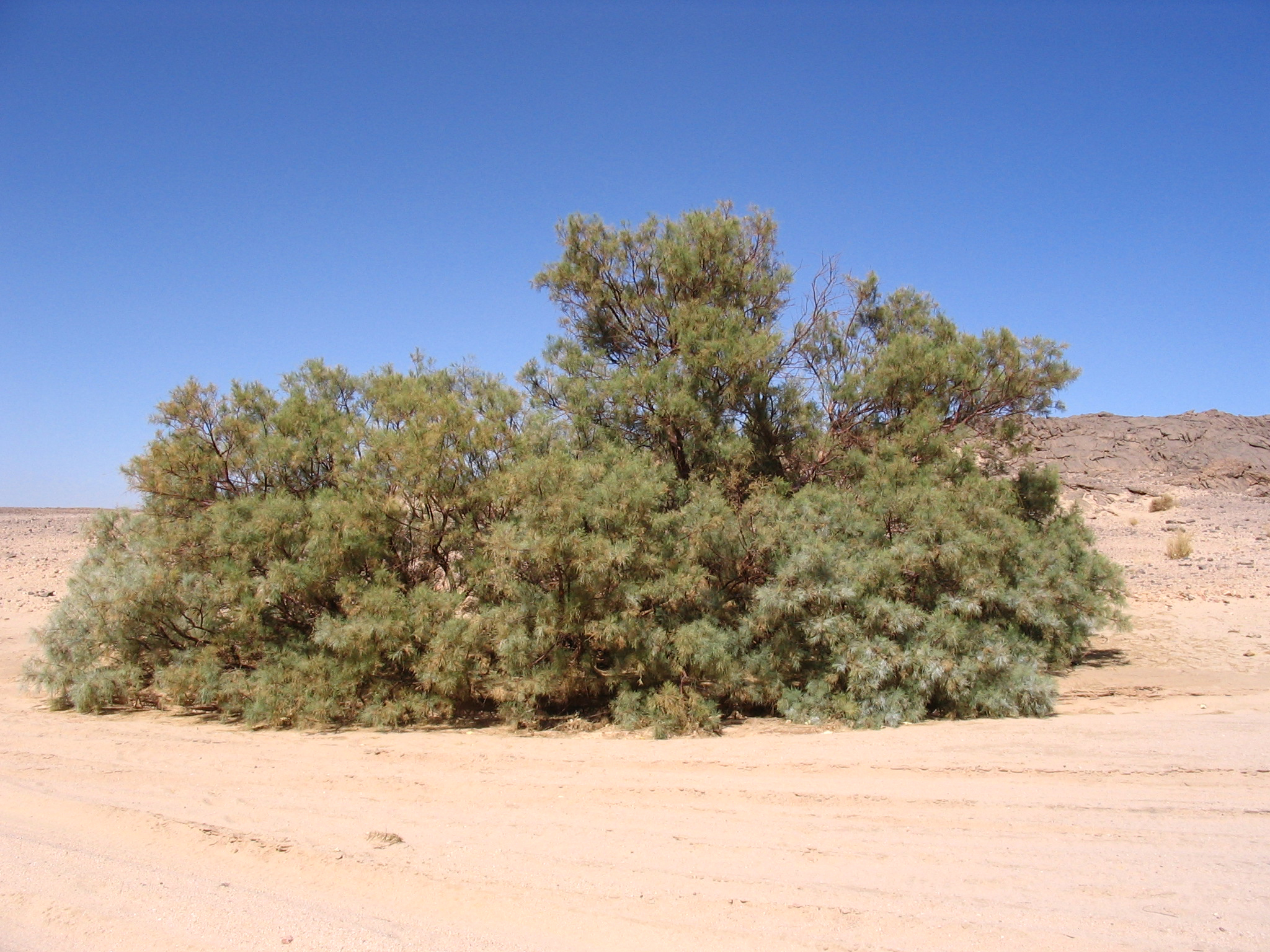
- Tamarix aphylla in natural habitat in Algeria

Scientific classification
- Kingdom: Plantae
- Clade: Embryophytes
- Clade: Tracheophytes
- Clade: Angiosperms
- Clade: Eudicots
- Order: Caryophyllales
- Family: Tamaricaceae
- Genus: Tamarix
- Species: T. aphylla

Binomial name
- Tamarix aphylla Carl Linnaeus (L.), Karst.

Synonyms
- Tamarix articulata

= Tamarix aphylla =

Species of plant

The athel tamarisk (Tamarix aphylla), also known as the athel tree or simply athel (Arabic: أثل, ʔaṯl), is the largest known species of Tamarix, with heights up to 18 metres (59 ft). It is an evergreen flowering tree, native across North, East, and Central Africa, through the Middle East, and into parts of Western and Southern Asia.

== Distribution ==
Tamarix aphylla is found along watercourses in arid areas. It is very resistant to saline and alkaline soils. Its range extends from latitude 35°N to 0°N, and its W–E range extends from Morocco and Algeria in North Africa, eastwards to Egypt, and south to the Horn of Africa and into Kenya. It is found in the Middle East and the Arabian Peninsula, east through Iran, and into Pakistan, Afghanistan, and India.

== Description ==
Tamarix aphylla grows as a tree to 18 metres (59 ft) high. The tiny leaves are alternately arranged along the branches, and exude salt, which can form a crusted layer on the surface, and drop onto the ground beneath. The species can reproduce by seed, by suckering, or from a cutting. It blooms from July till November.

== Salt tolerance and collecting humidity ==
The tree is known to be very tolerant of salts. It has been found that it excretes concentrated salty water from glands on its leaf surfaces; the water evaporates leaving a crust of crystals containing more than ten salts. Most of the crystals fall off, but the crystals of at least one, lithium sulphate, remain stuck on the leaves. These particular crystals swell with the small amount of humidity in the atmosphere at night, and the leaves absorb the moisture, helped by an adhesive surface that holds on to the water.

== Uses ==
Tamarix aphylla has been used as a windbreak and shade tree in agriculture and horticulture for decades, especially in dryer regions such as the western United States and central and western Australia. Due to its higher fire adaptability, it can be used as a barrier to fire. Even when dry, the wood of Tamarix is difficult to burn, due to the high ash content (30–40%) and higher salt content of its foliage. After a fire it usually regrows, unless the root-crown is destroyed.

The nectar from the blossoms of Tamarix aphylla produces high-quality honey with a unique taste. Due to the drought- and salt-tolerant properties of the tree, it could be planted as an agroforestry species, as well as for reclamation of marginal lands. A vegetative propagation method for the tree using the aeroponics technique has recently been developed.

The wood of the tree is usable in several applications, having medium mechanical properties.

=== Australia ===
Within these regions, it has spread, most dramatically and noticeably in central Australia after the floods of 1974 along the Finke River in the Northern Territory. Since then it has become a serious weed and invasive species in the Northern Territory and Western Australia. The species had been present for many decades without much spread before this.

It tends to use more water than most native plants in Australia, which it outcompetes. It has replaced the indigenous eucalyptus along watercourses in the interior. It has been declared a weed of national significance in Australia.

=== United States ===
It is commonly used for windbreaks on the edges of agricultural fields and as a shade tree in the deserts of the Southwestern United States. This species has not naturalized in areas of the United States where it has been grown, unlike other species in the genus Tamarix that are vigorously invasive.

== History ==
Most botanists and Bible scholars believe that the eshel tree planted by Abraham in the Book of Genesis, was Tamarix aphylla, Carl Linnaeus wrote that its name was derived from the Ancient Greek 'a' "without", and 'phyllon' "leaf".

In Urdu and Hindi, the tree is called farash (فراش) and in Punjabi, it is called kooan (کواں). In Baluchi, it is called shakargaaz or siahgaaz. In Saraiki, it is called Khagal. while in Pashto it is called Ghaz (غز).

== Chemistry ==
2,6-Digalloyl glucose and 3,6-digalloyl glucose are gallotannins which are found in the galls of T. aphylla.
