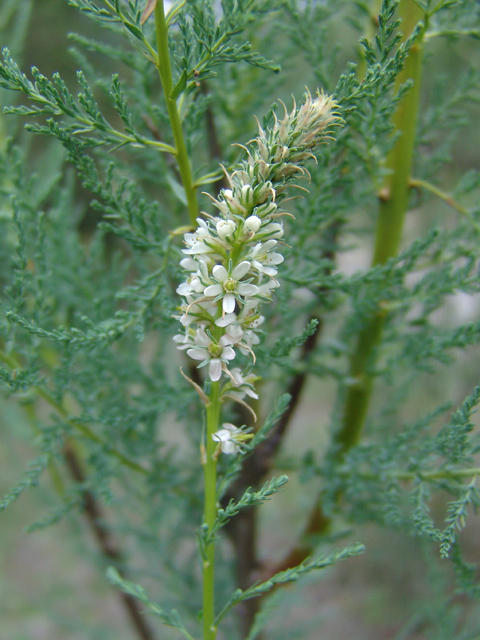
- Myricaria germanica

Scientific classification
- Kingdom: Plantae
- Clade: Tracheophytes
- Clade: Angiosperms
- Clade: Eudicots
- Order: Caryophyllales
- Family: Tamaricaceae
- Genus: Myricaria; Desv. (1825)

Species
- See text

Synonyms
- Myrica Bubani (1899), nom. illeg.; Myrice St.-Lag. (1881), orth. var.

= Myricaria =

Genus of flowering plants

Myricaria is a genus of flowering plants of the family Tamaricaceae. It includes 13 species native to temperate Eurasia, ranging from Spain to China.

Gene expression assays have been performed on Myricaria laxiflora to study flooding stress, as the species is endangered and inhabits the flood zone of the Yangtze River in China.

== Species ==
13 species are accepted.

- Myricaria albiflora Grierson & D.G.Long
- Myricaria bracteata Royle
- Myricaria davurica (Willd.) Ehrenb.
- Myricaria germanica (L.) Desv.
- Myricaria laxiflora (Franch.) P.Y. Zhang & Y.J.Zhang
- Myricaria longifolia (Willd.) Ehrenb.
- Myricaria paniculata P.Y.Zhang & Y.J.Zhang
- Myricaria platyphylla Maxim.
- Myricaria prostrata Hook.f. & Thomson
- Myricaria pulcherrima Batalin
- Myricaria rosea W.W.Sm.
- Myricaria squamosa Desv.
- Myricaria wardii C.Marquand
