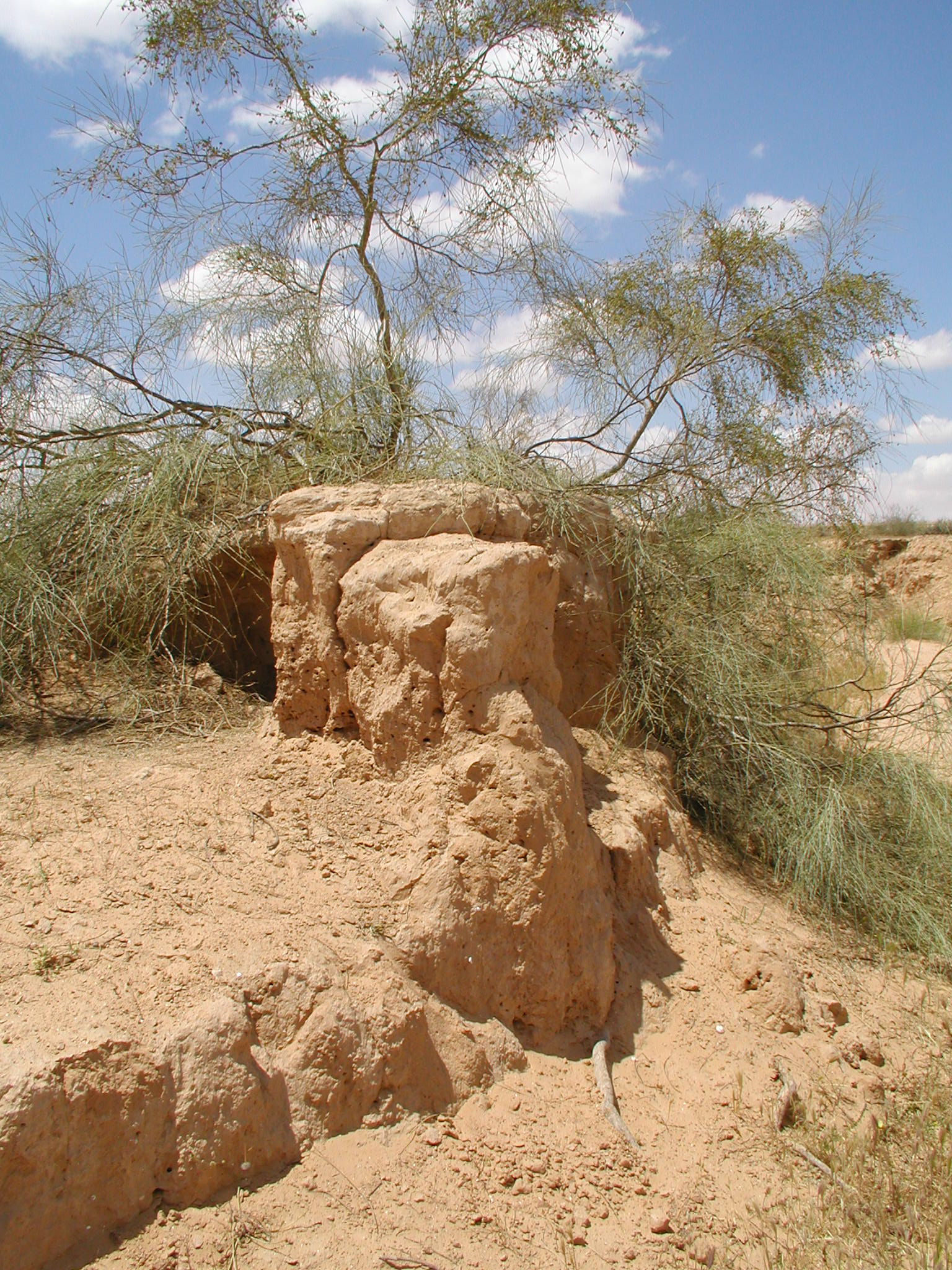
- Tamarix aphylla in its natural habitat in Negev Desert

Scientific classification
- Kingdom: Plantae
- Clade: Tracheophytes
- Clade: Angiosperms
- Clade: Eudicots
- Order: Caryophyllales
- Family: Tamaricaceae
- Genus: Tamarix; L.

Species
- See text

= Tamarix =

Genus of plants

The genus Tamarix (tamarisk, salt cedar, taray) is composed of about 50–60 species of flowering plants in the family Tamaricaceae, native to drier areas of Eurasia and Africa. The generic name originated in Latin and may refer to the Tamaris River in Hispania Tarraconensis (Spain).

== Description ==
They are evergreen or deciduous shrubs or trees growing to 1–18 m (3 1/2–59 ft) in height and forming dense thickets. The largest, Tamarix aphylla, is an evergreen tree that can grow to 18 m (59 ft) tall. They usually grow on saline soils, tolerating up to 15,000 ppm soluble salt, and can also tolerate alkaline conditions.

Tamarisks are characterized by slender branches and grey-green foliage. The bark of young branches is smooth and reddish brown. As the plants age, the bark becomes gray-brown, ridged and furrowed.

The leaves are scale-like, almost like that of junipers, 1–2 mm (1/20–1/10 in) long, and overlap each other along the stem. They are often encrusted with salt secretions.

The pink to white flowers appear in dense masses on 5–10 cm (2.0–3.9 in) long spikes at branch tips from March to September, though some species (e.g., T. aphylla) tend to flower in the summer until as late as November.

== Selected species ==
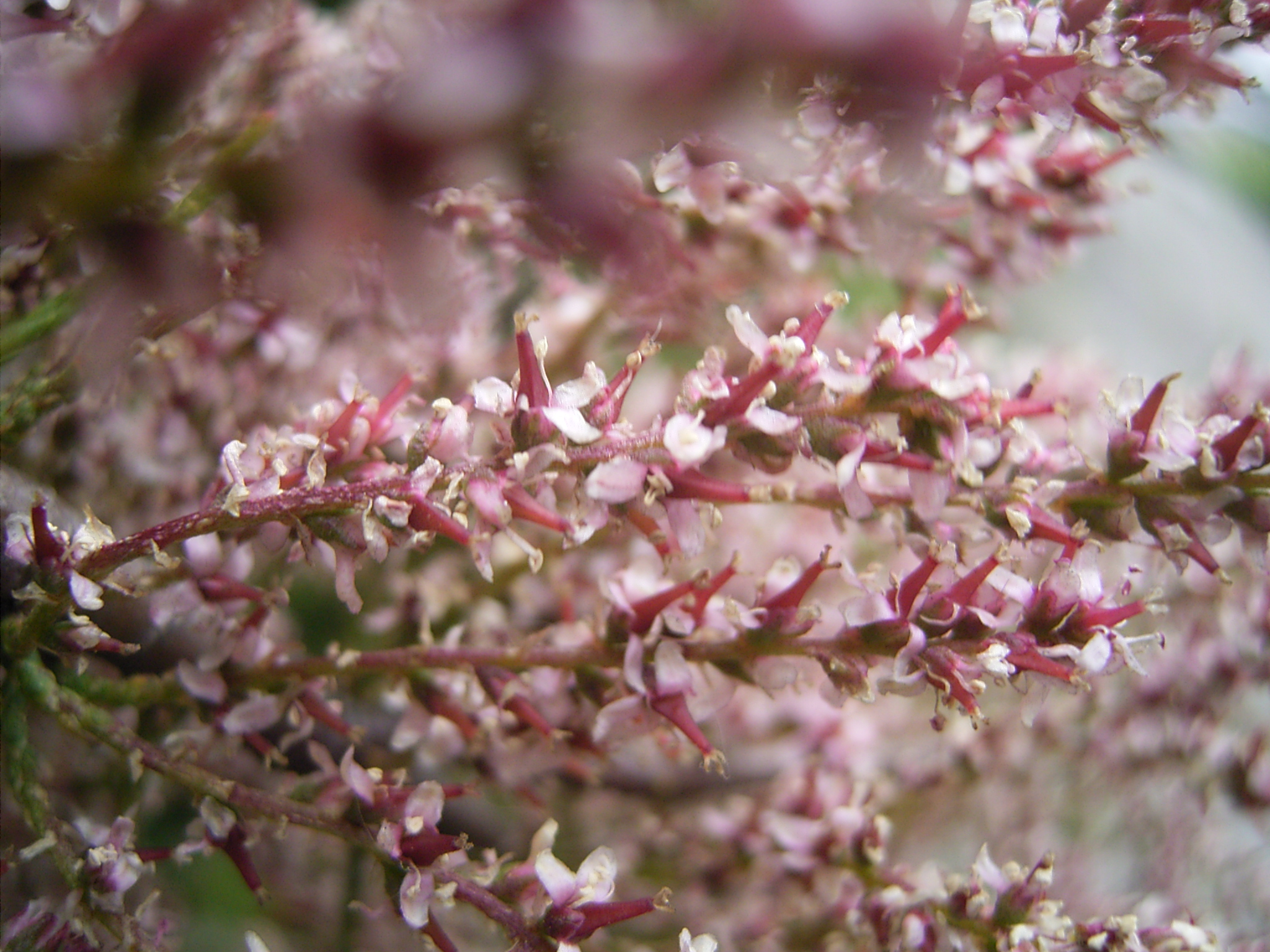
Tamarix gallica in flower

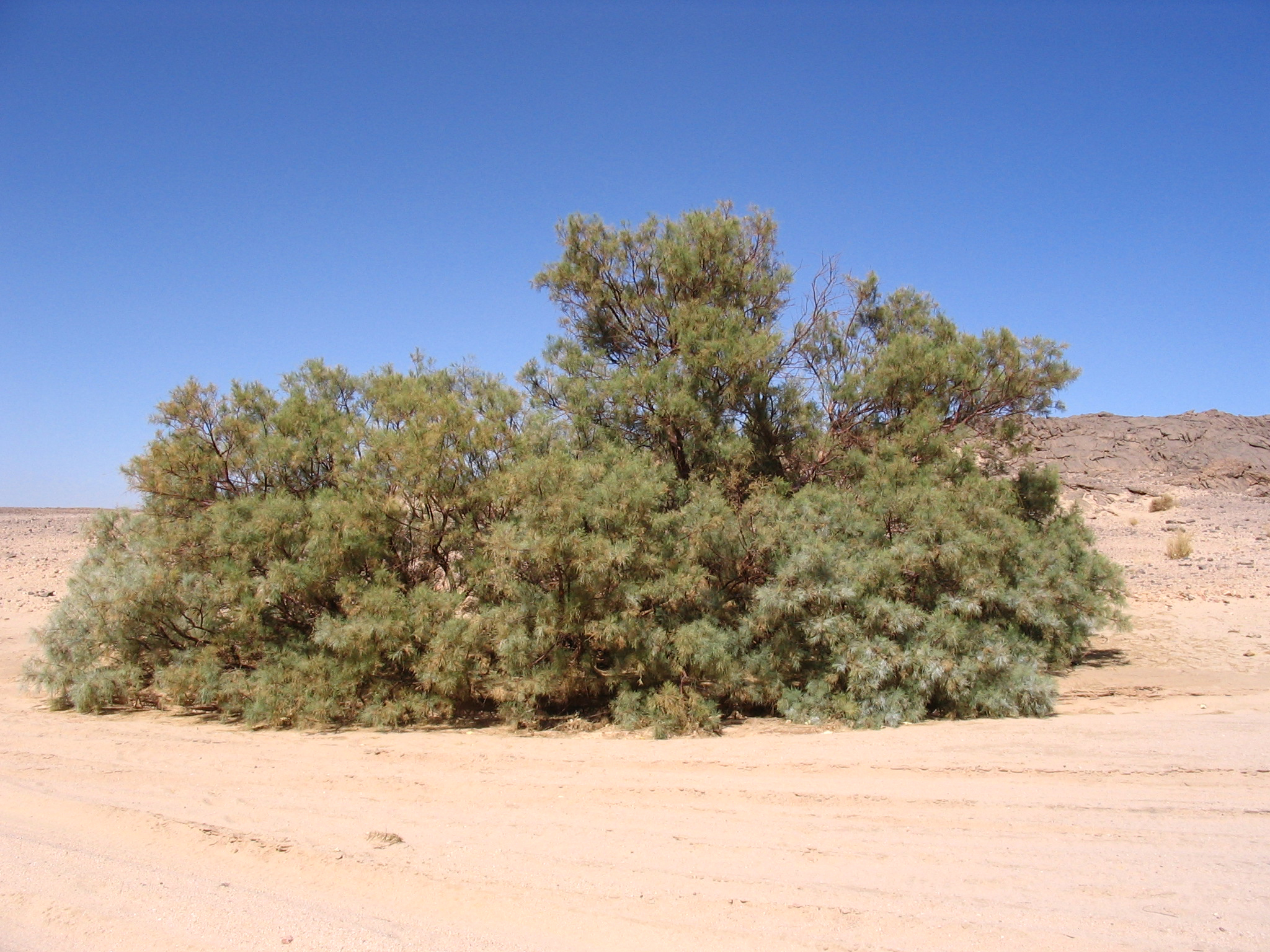
A Tamarix aphylla specimen in its natural habitat in Algeria

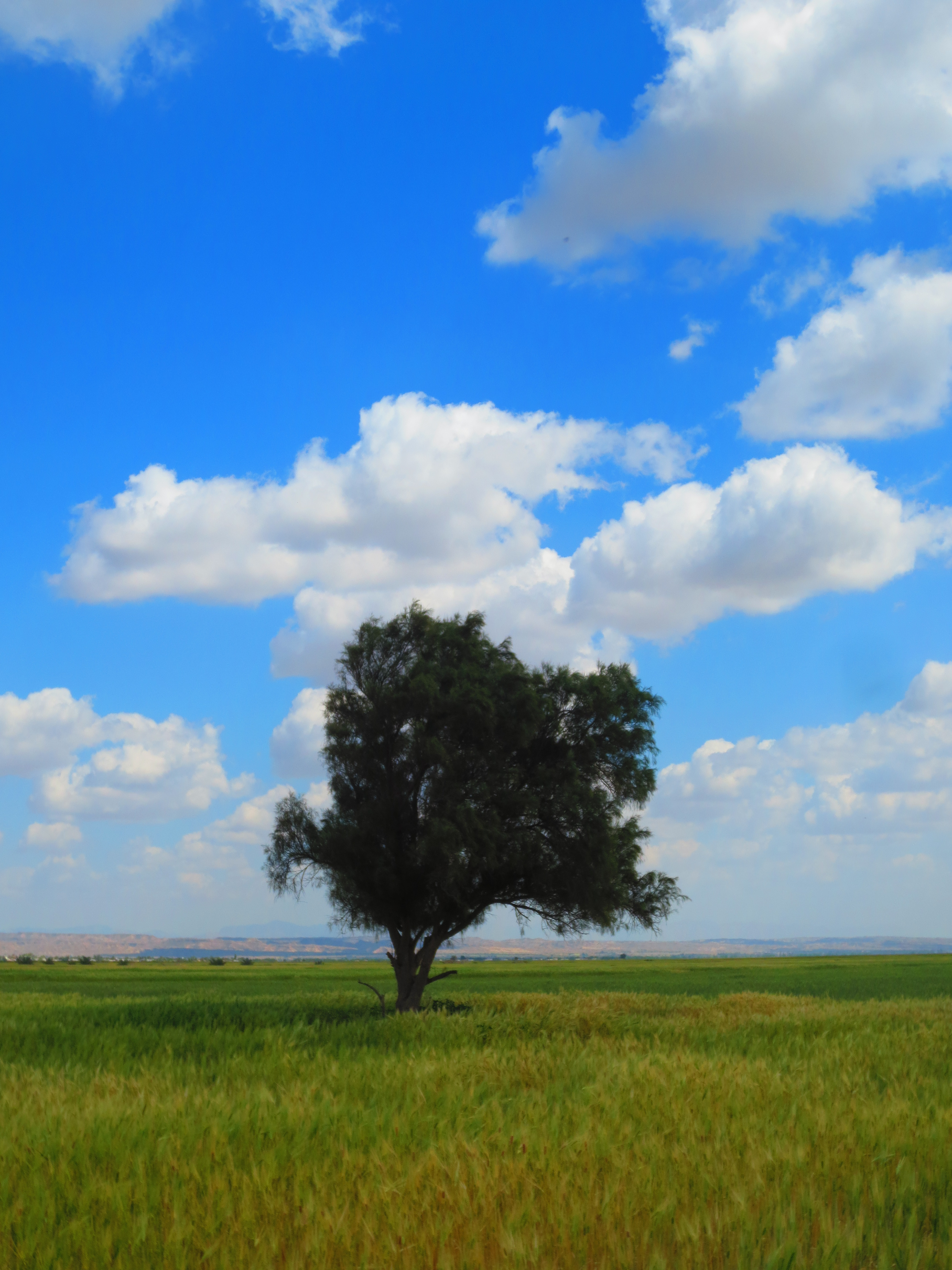
Tamarix stricta in Ateybeh village, Boushehr, Iran

- Tamarix arabica
- Tamarix africana Poir.
- Tamarix androssowii
- Tamarix aphylla (L.) H.Karst.
- Tamarix arceuthoides
- Tamarix articulata
- Tamarix austromongolica
- Tamarix boveana
- Tamarix canariensis
- Tamarix chinensis Lour.
- Tamarix dalmatica
- Tamarix dioica Roxb. ex Roth
- Tamarix duezenlii
- Tamarix elongata
- Tamarix gallica L.
- Tamarix gansuensis
- Tamarix gennessarensis Zohary
- Tamarix gracilis Willd.
- Tamarix hampeana
- Tamarix hispida Willd.
- Tamarix indica
- Tamarix jintaenia
- Tamarix juniperina
- Tamarix jordanis
- Tamarix karelinii Bunge
- Tamarix laxa Willd.
- Tamarix leptopetala
- Tamarix leptostachys
- Tamarix mannifera (Ehrenb.) Bunge
- Tamarix mongolica
- Tamarix negevensis
- Tamarix nilotica
- Tamarix parviflora DC.
- Tamarix ramosissima Ledeb.
- Tamarix stricta
- Tamarix sachuensis
- Tamarix senegalensis DC.
- Tamarix smyrnensis Bunge (=T. hohenackeri)
- Tamarix taklamakanensis
- Tamarix tarimensis
- Tamarix tenuissima
- Tamarix tetragyna Ehrenb.
  - Tamarix tetragyna var. meyeri (Boiss.) Boiss. (=T. meyeri)
  - Tamarix tetragyna var. tetragyna
- Tamarix tetrandra Pall. ex M.Bieb.
- Tamarix usneoides E.Mey. ex Bunge

=== Formerly placed here ===
- Myricaria germanica (L.) Desv. (as T. germanica L.)

== Ecology ==
Tamarix aphylla can spread both vegetatively, by submerged stems producing adventitious roots, and sexually, by seeds. Each flower can produce thousands of tiny (1 mm; 1/20" diameter) seeds that are contained in a small capsule usually adorned with a tuft of hair that aids in wind dispersal. Seeds can also be dispersed by water. Seedlings require extended periods of soil saturation for establishment. Tamarisk trees are most often propagated by cuttings.

These trees grow in disturbed and undisturbed streams, waterways, bottom lands, banks, and drainage washes of natural or artificial water bodies, moist rangelands and pastures.

Whether Tamarix species are fire-adapted or not is unclear, but in many cases a large proportion of the trees are able to resprout from the stump after fires, although not notably more so than other riverine species. They likely cannot resprout from root suckers. In some habitats where they are native, wildfire appears to favour the establishment of riverine trees such as Populus, to the detriment of Tamarix. Conversely, they do appear to be more flammable, with more dead wood produced and debris held aloft. In the southwestern US, most stands studied appear to be burning at faster intervals than they can fully mature and die of natural causes.

Tamarix species are used as food plants by the larvae of some Lepidoptera species including Coleophora asthenella which feeds exclusively on T. africana.

=== As an invasive species ===
In some specific riparian habitats in the Southwestern United States and California, Tamarix ramosissima has naturalized and become a significant invasive plant species. In other areas, the plants form dense monocultures that alter the natural environment and compete with native species already stressed by human activity. Recent scientific investigations have generally concluded that the primary human-caused impact to desert riparian ecosystems within the Colorado River Basin is the alteration of the flood regime by dams; Tamarix ramosissima is relatively tolerant of this hydrologic alteration compared to flood-dependent native woody riparian species such as willow, cottonwood, and box elder.

==== Competition with native plants ====
Research on competition between tamarisk seedlings and co-occurring native trees has found that Tamarix seedlings are not competitive over a range of environments, but stands of mature trees effectively prevent native species' establishment in the understory, due to low light, elevated salinity, and possibly changes to the soil biota. However, box elder seedlings (Acer negundo, a native riparian tree) survive and grow under higher-shade conditions than Tamarix seedlings, and mature Tamarix specimens die after 1–2 years of 98% shade, indicating a pathway for successional replacement of Tamarix by box elder. Anthropogenic activities that preferentially favor tamarisk (such as changes to flooding regimens) are associated with infestation. To date, Tamarix has taken over large sections of riparian ecosystems in the western United States that were once home to native cottonwoods and willows, and are projected by some to spread well beyond the current range.

In a 2013 study which examined if native plant growth was hindered by the microbiota associated with the presence of Tamarix, a relatively new invasive plant to the northern United States, Elymus lanceolatus and other native plants in fact grew better when a small soil sample from areas where Tamarix trees grew was mixed in with the potting soil, as opposed to samples without these plants. This was thought to indicate the presence of beneficial mycorrhizae. The presence of Tamarix plants has also been shown to boost soil fertility in a number of studies, and it also increases soil salinity. Two studies found that Tamarix plants are able to limit the recruitment of Salix and Populus tree species, in the latter case possibly due to interfering with the trees ability to form symbiotic relationships with arbuscular mycorrhizal fungi, in contrast to the grass and legume species studied in 2013.

Because it is much more efficient at both obtaining water from drying soil and conserving water during drought, it can outcompete many native species, especially after the habitat is altered by controlling flood regimes and disturbance of water sources. However, an investigation into competition for water between adult Tamarix and native cottonwood, ash, and mesquite found that "native trees are still competitive with salt cedar (Tamarix) so that a mixed plant community is likely to continue on the San Pedro River on the condition that current groundwater levels and river flows are maintained".

Because the trees are able to concentrate salts on the outside of their leaves, dense stands of the tree will form a layer of high salinity on the topsoil as the leaves are shed. Although this layer is easily washed off during flooding events, in areas where the rivers are channelled and floods are controlled, this salty layer inhibits the germination of a number of native plants. However, a study involving more than a thousand soil samples across gradients of both flood frequency and Tamarix density concluded that "flooding may be the most important factor for assessing floodplain salinity" and "soils under Tamarix canopies had lower surface soil salinity than open areas deprived of flooding suggesting that surface evaporation may contribute more to surface soil salinity than Tamarix".

==== Investigation of effects of invasion ====
Tamarix species are commonly believed to disrupt the structure and stability of North American native plant communities and degrade native wildlife habitat, by outcompeting and replacing native plant species, salinizing soils, monopolizing limited sources of moisture, and increasing the frequency, intensity, and effect of fires and floods. While individual plants may not consume larger quantities of water than native species, large, dense stands of tamarisk do consume more water than equivalent stands of native cottonwoods. An active and ongoing debate exists as to when the tamarisk can out-compete native plants, and if it is actively displacing native plants or it just taking advantage of disturbance by removal of natives by humans and changes in flood regimens.

==== Controls ====
Pest populations of tamarisk in the United States can be dealt with in several ways. The National Park Service has used the methods of physically removing the plants, spraying them with herbicides, and introducing northern tamarisk beetles (Diorhabda carinulata) in the national park system. Various attempts to control tamarisk have been implemented on federal lands including Dinosaur National Monument, San Andres National Wildlife Refuge, and White Sands Missile Range. After years of study, the USDA Agricultural Research Service found that the introduced tamarisk beetles (Diorhabda elongata) eat only the tamarisk, and starve when no more is available, not eating any plants native to North America.

== Uses ==
- Tamarisk species, notably T. ramosissima and T. tetrandra, are used as ornamental shrubs, windbreaks, and shade trees.
- In the Southwest United States, tamarisk was introduced to help erosion control.
- On the steppes of Central Asia, the Saka may have used tamarisk wood (combined with horn) to produce tremendously powerful bows hundreds of years before the common era.
- The wood may be used for carpentry or firewood; it is a possible agroforestry species.
- At certain times of year, scale insects feeding upon the tender twigs of tamarisk plants excrete a sweet substance known as honeydew, which has been gathered for use as a food source and sweetener for thousands of years. The substance is also known locally as manna, and some scholars have suggested that this substance is the biblical manna that fed the Israelites during their flight from Egypt, though others dispute this interpretation.
- Tamarisks play a role in anti-desertification programs in China.

=== In North America ===
The tamarisk was introduced to the United States as an ornamental shrub, a windbreak, and a shade tree in the early 19th century. In the 1930s, during the Great Depression, tree-planting was used as a tool to fight soil erosion on the Great Plains, and different trees were planted by the millions in the Great Plains Shelterbelt, including salt cedars.

Eight species are found in North America. They can be divided into two subgroups:

Evergreen species

Tamarix aphylla (Athel tree), a large evergreen tree, does not sexually reproduce in the local climate and is not considered a seriously invasive species. The Athel tree is commonly used for windbreaks on the edge of agricultural fields and as a shade tree in the deserts of the Southwestern United States.

Deciduous species

The second subgroup contains the deciduous tamarisks, which are small, shrubby trees, commonly known as "saltcedars". These include T. pentandra, T. tetrandra, T. gallica, T. chinensis, T. ramosissima and T. parviflora.

== In culture ==
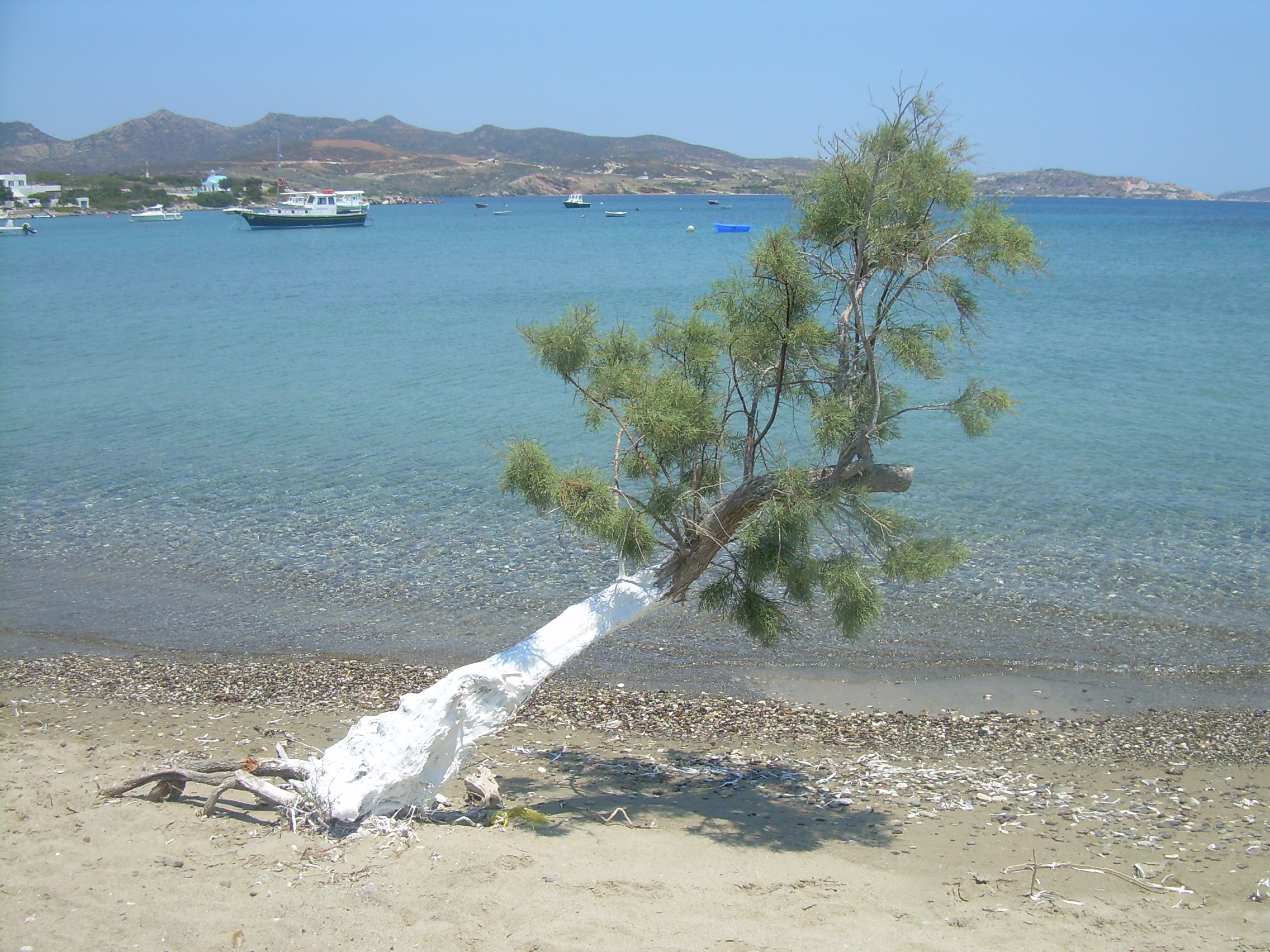
Tamarisk tree (almyriki) in Milos island, Greece

- A disputation poem dating to the 18th century BC, Tamarisk and Palm, features a personified tamarisk debating the date-palm over who is better.
- In Genesis 21:33, Abraham is recorded to have "planted a tamarisk at Beer-sheba". He had built a well there, earlier.
- In 1 Samuel 22:6, Saul is sitting under a tamarisk tree on a hill at Gibeah when he learns that David has returned to Judah.
- In 1 Samuel 31:13, Saul's bones are buried under a tamarisk tree in Jabesh.
- In the Quran 34:16, the people of Saba were punished when "[Allah] converted their two garden (rows) into gardens producing bitter fruit and tamarisks...".
- Wedgwood made a "Tamarisk" china pattern.
- In the Iliad 10:465 Odysseus buries the spoils from a captured Trojan spy under a tamarisk tree, and marks their spot with reeds and tamarisk shoots. The spoils (a polecat cap, wolfskin cloak, long spear and bow) are dedicated to the goddess Athena.
- Gerald Murnane's prose fiction Tamarisk Row refers to a racehorse, and to an estate, of that name
