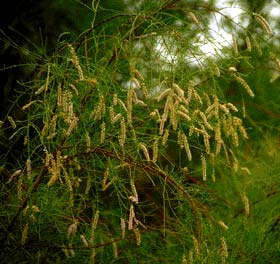
- Tamarix in flower

Scientific classification
- Kingdom: Plantae
- Clade: Embryophytes
- Clade: Tracheophytes
- Clade: Spermatophytes
- Clade: Angiosperms
- Clade: Eudicots
- Order: Caryophyllales
- Family: Tamaricaceae; Link (1821) nom. cons.

Genera
- Myricaria Desv.; Myrtama Ovcz. & Kinzik.; Reaumuria L.; Tamarix L.

= Tamaricaceae =

Family of flowering plants

The Tamaricaceae, the tamarisk family, are a family of plants native to drier areas of Europe, Asia, and Africa. It contains four genera: Tamarix (with 73 species), Reaumuria (25 species), Myricaria (13 species), and Myrtama (a single species).

In the 1980s, the family was classified in the Violales under the Cronquist system; more modern classifications (Angiosperm Phylogeny Group) place them in the Caryophyllales.

Many of the plants in the family grow on saline soils, tolerating up to 15,000 ppm soluble salt and can also tolerate alkaline conditions. The leaves are generally scale-like, measure 1–5 mm long, overlap each other along the stem, and in some species are encrusted with salt secretions.
