= Wildlife of Egypt =

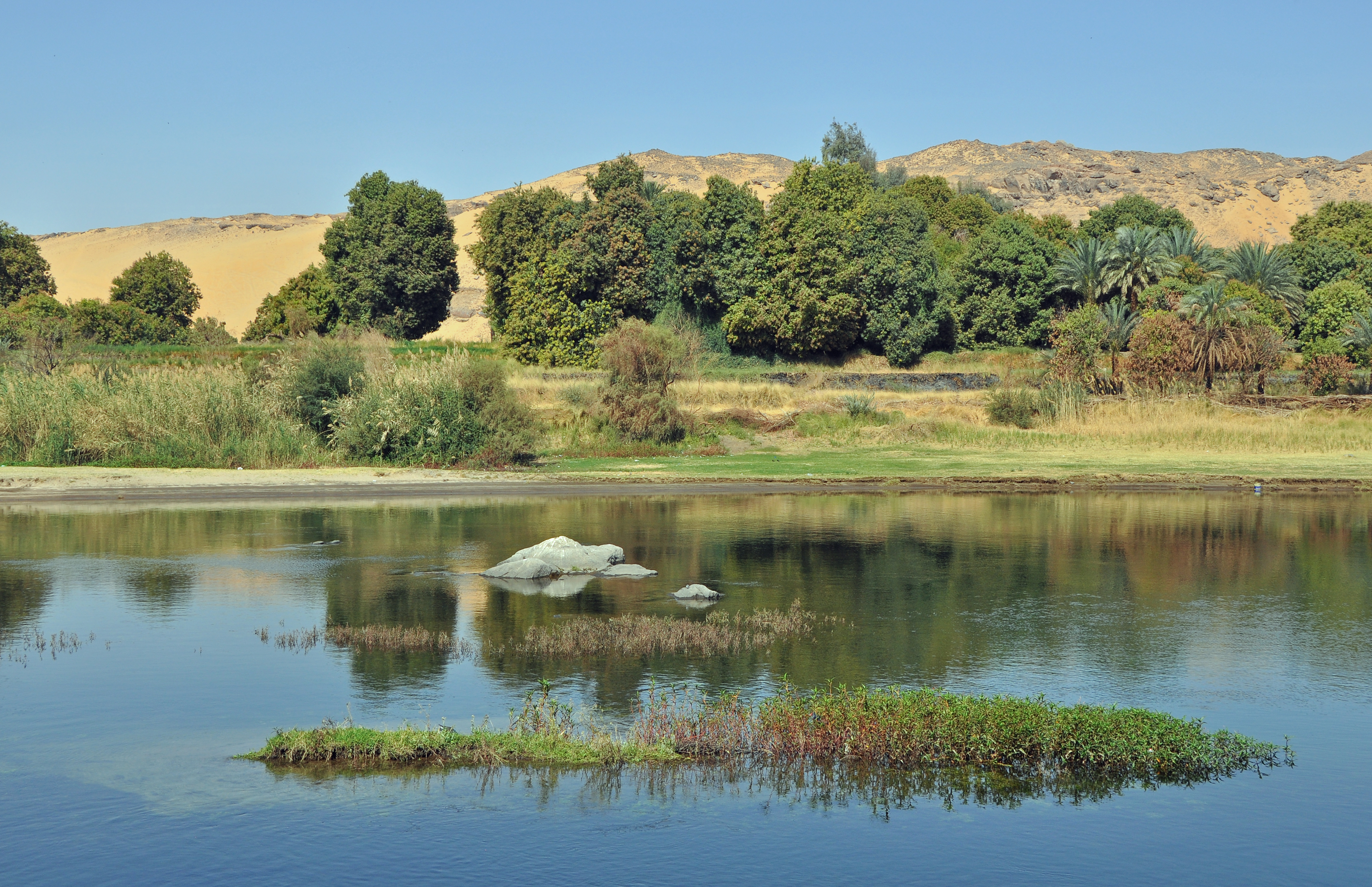
Vegetation beside the Nile near Aswan

The wildlife of Egypt is composed of the flora and fauna of this country in North Africa and West Asia, and is substantial and varied. Apart from the fertile Nile Valley, which bisects the country from south to north, the majority of Egypt's landscape is desert, with a few scattered oases. It has long coastlines on the Mediterranean Sea, the Gulf of Suez, the Gulf of Aqaba and the Red Sea. Each geographic region has a diversity of plants and animals each adapted to its own particular habitat.

== Geography ==
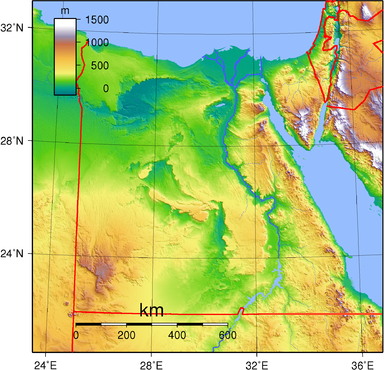
Topographical map of Egypt

Egypt is bordered by the Mediterranean Sea to the north, Libya to the west and Sudan to the south. To the east lies the Red Sea, and the Sinai Peninsula, the Asian part of the country, which is bordered by the Gaza Strip and Israel. Egypt is a transcontinental nation, providing a land bridge between Africa and Asia. This is traversed by the Suez Canal which connects the Mediterranean Sea with the Indian Ocean by way of the Red Sea. This results in the flora and fauna having influences from both Africa and Asia, and the marine life from both the Atlantic / Mediterranean Sea and the Red Sea / Indian Ocean.

The River Nile enters Egypt as it flows through Lake Nasser, formed by the building of the Aswan Dam. In its lower reaches, the river is about 0.75 km (0.5 mi) wide and the alluvial plain about 10 km (6 mi) wide. The annual flooding of the Nile no longer occurs and the fertility of the Nile Valley is now maintained by irrigation rather than the deposition of silt. Much of the Nile is bordered by flat land but in some places there are low cliffs. Where the river flows into the Mediterranean, there is an extensive fan-shaped delta area with channels, lakes and salt marshes.

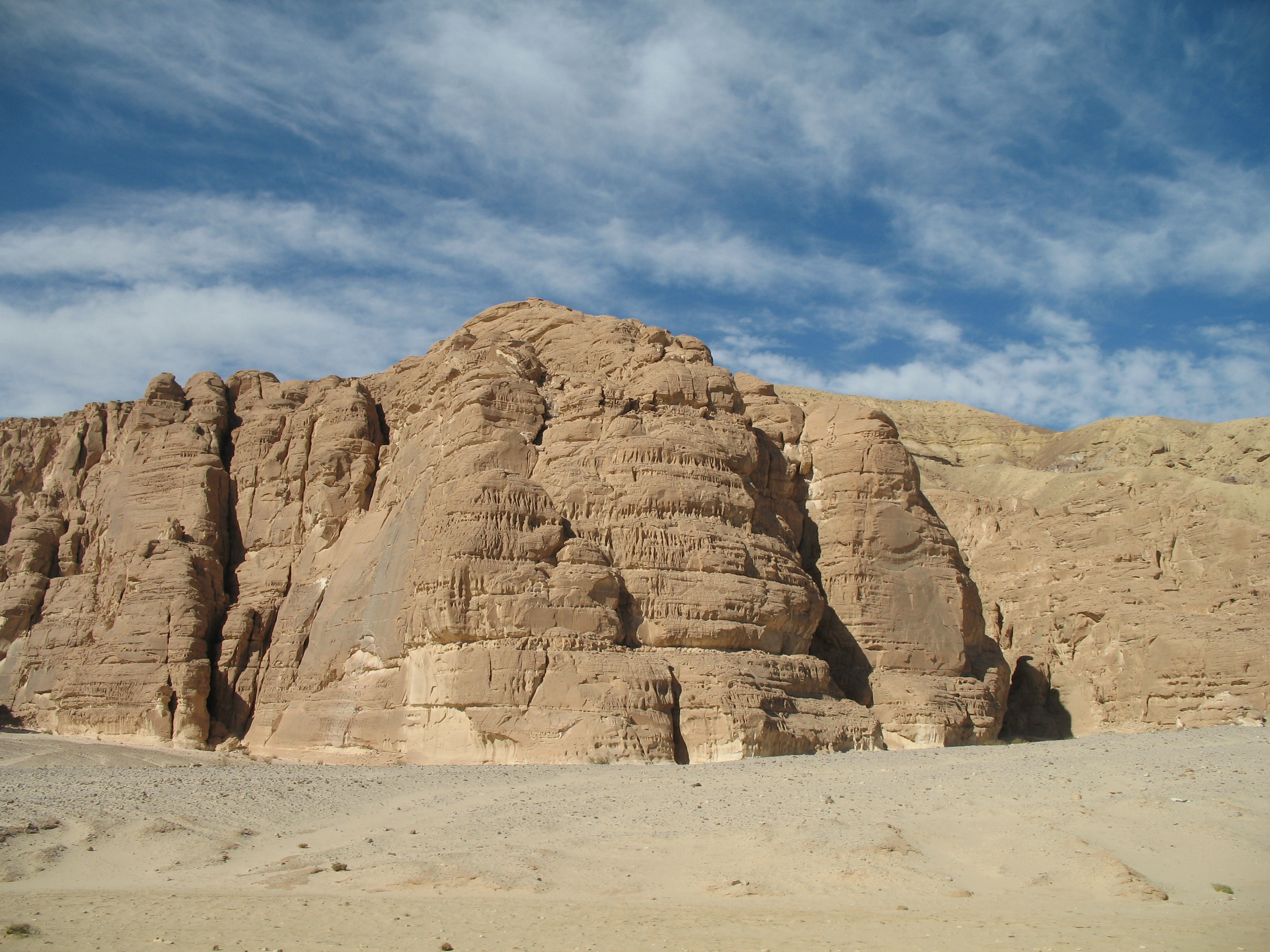
Desert in Sinai

To the west of the Nile lies the Western Desert, occupying about two-thirds of the area of the country. It consists largely of high stony and sandy plains with rocky plateaux in places. In the extreme southwest of the country on the border with Libya and Sudan, is Jebel Uweinat, a mountainous region and in the northwest lies the Qattara Depression, a large area of land some 133 m (436 ft) below sea level. Another depression, the Faiyum Oasis lies south west of Cairo and is connected to the Nile by a channel. To the east of the Nile lies the much smaller Eastern Desert, a high mountain ridge running parallel with the Red Sea, seamed with wadis on either flank. At the border with Sudan this rises to the rocky massif of Gebel Elba. The Sinai Peninsula is a mountainous area, deeply cleft by canyon-like wadis that flow towards the Gulf of Aqaba, the Gulf of Suez and the Mediterranean Sea.

In general, Egypt is a very dry country. The Western Desert receives only occasional rainfall, the winters being mild and the summers very hot. The Eastern Desert receives some precipitation in the south in the form of orographic rainfall from winds that have crossed the Red Sea; this may cause torrential flows in the wadis. The winters here are mild and the summers hot, and Gebel Elba is cooler and wetter than other parts. The northern areas of the country, particularly close to the coast, receive some precipitation from Mediterranean weather systems.

== Flora ==
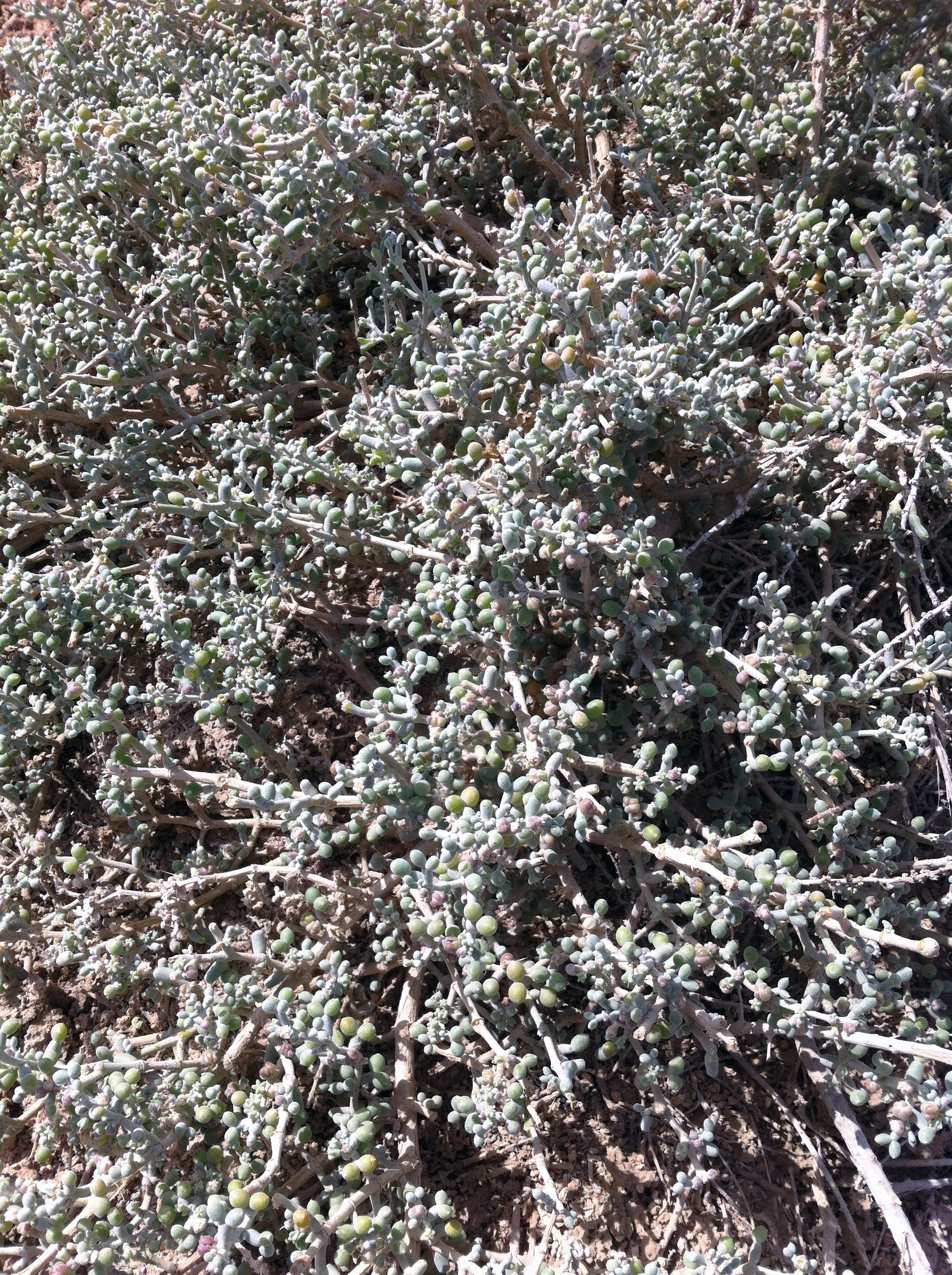
Zygophyllum album, a desert plant

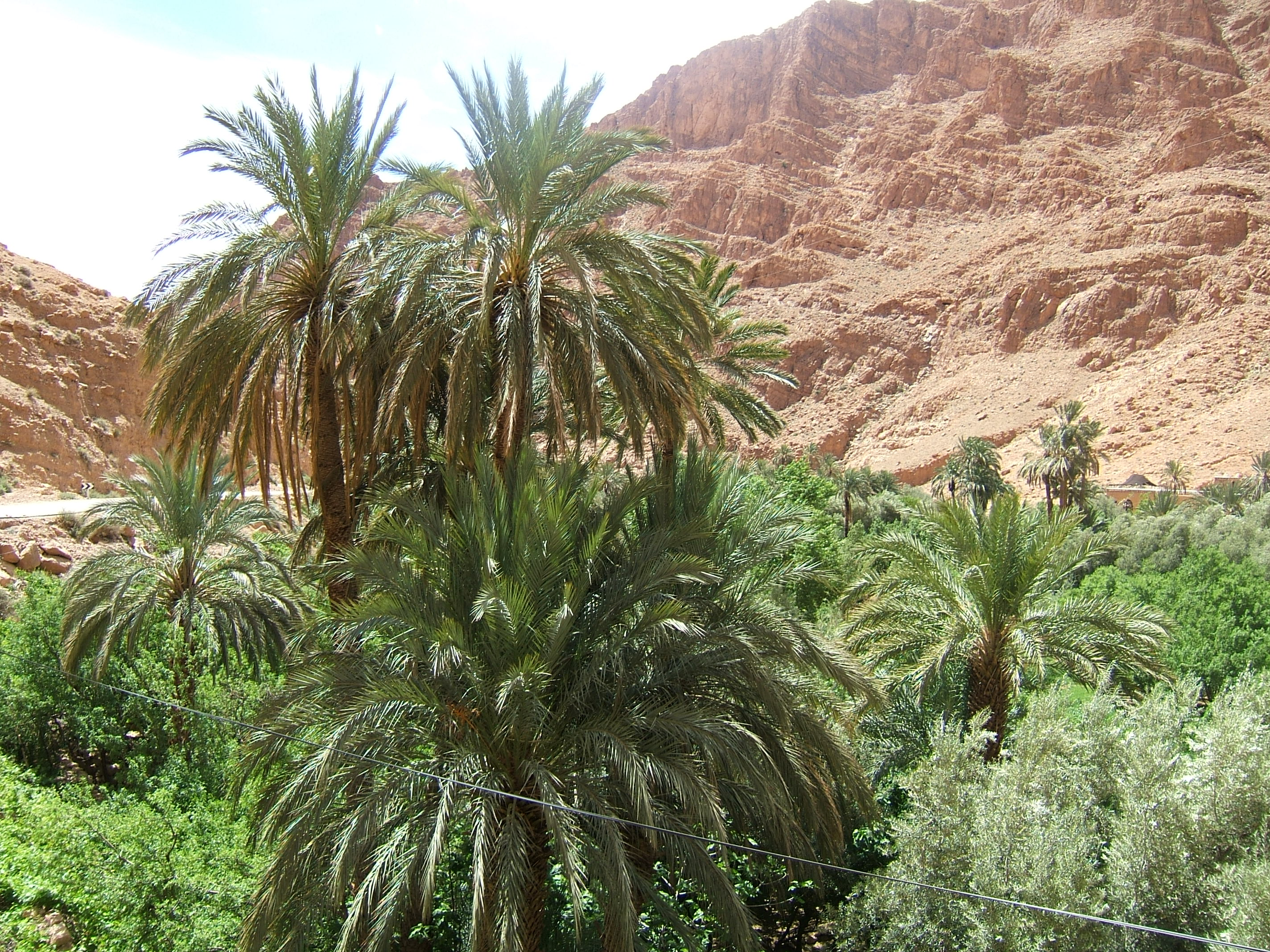
Date palm

The Nile is the lifeline of Egypt, the land bordering the river being rendered fertile by the irrigation it receives. Crops grown in the Nile Valley include cotton, cereals, sugarcane, beans, oil seed crops and peanuts. Date palms grow here as well as sycamore, carob and Acacia. Fruit trees are planted here and eucalyptus has been introduced. The rich delta soil is used for the cultivation of grapes, vegetables and flowers. The papyrus reeds that used to line the river are now restricted to the far south of the country, as are the crocodiles and hippopotamuses that also used to be plentiful.

Large parts of the Western Desert are completely devoid of vegetation. The plants that do grow are adapted to the arid conditions and tend to be small and wiry, have small, leathery leaves, long shallow roots to exploit any available water, prickles or thorns to deter herbivores, and sometimes thick stems or leaves to store water. They include acacia trees, palms, succulents, spiny shrubs, and grasses. Some plants adopt an ephemeral life style, sprouting or springing into life when rain falls, rapidly reaching the flowering stage and producing long-lived durable seed. In depressions in the Western Desert, some plant communities are dominated by Zygophyllum album, Nitraria retusa and Tamarix nilotica. In the Siwa Oasis there are small lakes, reedbeds dominated by Phragmites australis and Typha domingensis, and saltmarshes with Arthrocnemum macrostachyum, Juncus rigidus, Alhagi maurorum, Cladium mariscus and Cressa cretica.

In the mountains of the Eastern Desert grows the tree Balanites aegyptiaca, the open patchy woodland being remnants of forests that used to cover this region. In the Gulf of Suez coastal area the rainfall is supplemented by condensation from clouds. Water may ooze from cracks, flow down runnels and collect in potholes. Here mosses, ferns and various vascular plants grow, and Ficus pseudosycamorus and stunted date palms grow from cracks.

The flora of the Sinai Peninsula mountains is very varied and is largely of Irano-Turanian origin. Here soil and plant litter accumulates in crevices and depressions in the rock and provides anchorage for roots. The most common plant is Artemisia inculta, and rocky slopes support shrubs, semi-shrubs and trees.

== Fauna ==
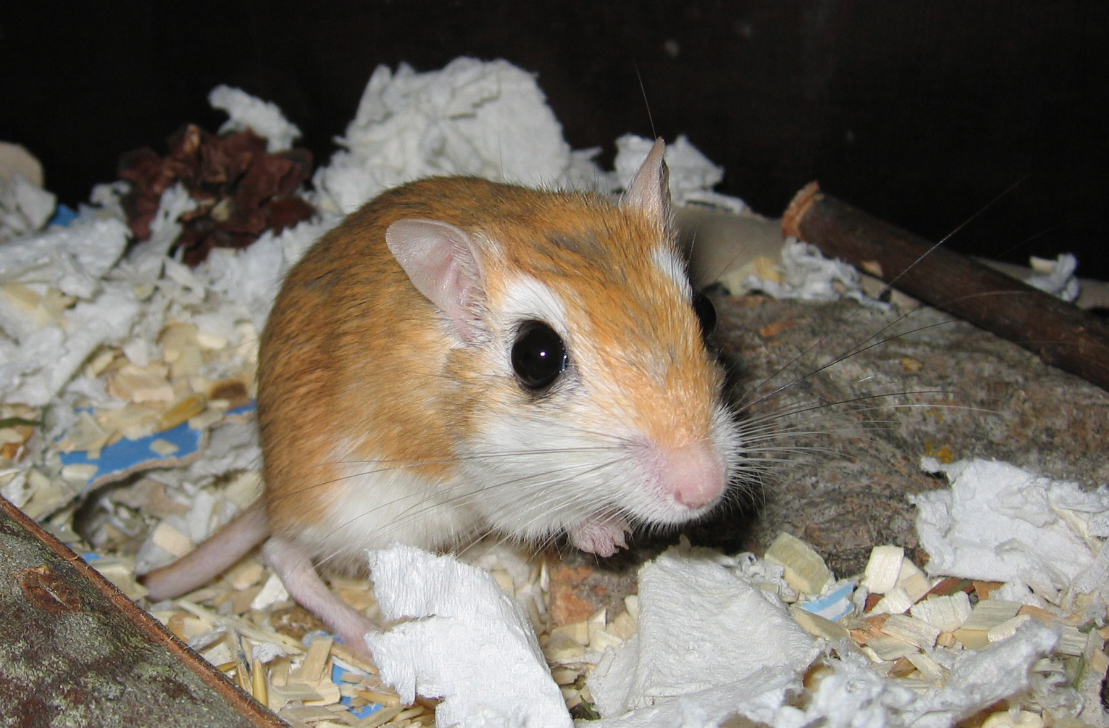
The endemic pallid gerbil

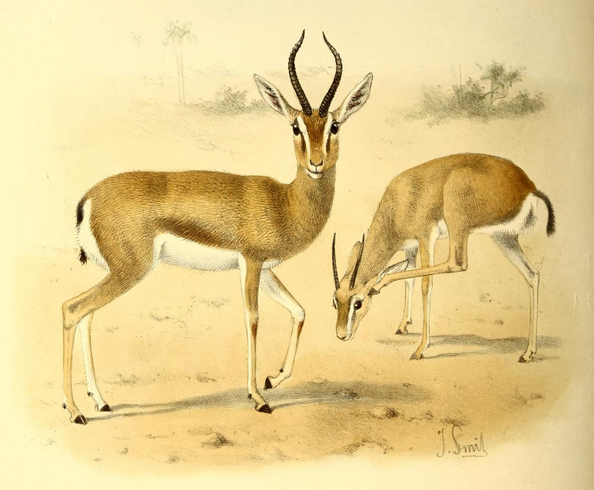
Dorcas gazelle

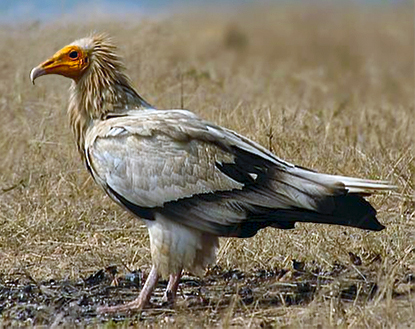
The endangered Egyptian vulture

At one time Egypt had a cooler, wetter climate than it has today; ancient tomb paintings show giraffes, hippopotamuses, crocodiles and ostriches, and the petroglyphs at Silwa Bahari on the upper Nile, between Luxor and Aswan, show African bush elephants, white rhinoceroses, gerenuk and more ostriches, a fauna akin to that of present-day East Africa. Nor does the country have many endemic species, these being limited to the Egyptian weasel, pallid gerbil, Mackilligin's gerbil (this may possibly extend into the Sudan), Flower's shrew, Nile Delta toad, and two butterflies, the Sinai baton blue and Satyrium jebelia.

Mammals of the Western Desert have been depleted over the years and the addax and scimitar oryx are no longer found there, and the Atlas lion has probably gone as well. The remaining mammals include the rhim gazelle, dorcas gazelle, Barbary sheep, Rüppell's fox, lesser Egyptian jerboa and Giza gerbil. Notable birds from this desert include the spotted sandgrouse, greater hoopoe-lark and white-crowned wheatear.

The Eastern Desert has a quite different range of fauna and has much in common with the Sinai Peninsula, showing the importance of the broad Nile in separating the two desert regions. Here are found the striped hyena, Nubian ibex, bushy-tailed jird, golden spiny mouse, Blanford's fox and Rüppell's fox. The sand partridge, streaked scrub warbler, mourning wheatear and white-crowned wheatear are typical of this region. The high rocky mountains of Gebel Elba in the south have a distinctive range of animals including the aardwolf, striped polecat, and common genet, and there may still be African wild ass in this area.

Birds are abundant in Egypt, especially in the Nile Valley and the Delta region. Birds of prey include vultures, eagles, hawks, falcons and owls. Other large birds include storks, flamingoes, herons, egrets, pelicans, quail, sunbirds and golden orioles. About four hundred and eighty species of bird have been recorded, the globally endangered ones being the red-breasted goose, white-headed duck, Balearic shearwater, Egyptian vulture, Rüppell's vulture, sociable lapwing, slender-billed curlew, saker falcon and yellow-breasted bunting. Egypt is on a major bird migratory route between Eurasia and East Africa and around two hundred species of migrants pass through twice a year.

About thirty species of snake occur in Egypt, about half of them venomous. These include the Egyptian cobra, false smooth snake and horned viper. There are also numerous species of lizards. Above the Aswan Dam, the shores of Lake Nasser are largely barren, but the lake does support the last remaining Nile crocodiles and African softshell turtle in Egypt.

Over one hundred species of fish live in the Nile and the Delta region. Egypt also has a large aquaculture industry producing tilapia in semi-intensive pond systems.

== See also ==
- List of wild animals of Egypt
