= Moghra Oasis =

Water source in Western Desert (Egypt)

Moghra Oasis واحة القارة
- Water source
- Location in Egypt
- Coordinates: 30.255°N 28.931°E
- Country: Egypt
- Governorate: Matrouh

Population
  - Total: 0
- Time zone: UTC+2 (EST)

The Moghra Oasis is an uninhabited oasis in the northeastern part of the Qattara Depression in the Western Desert of Egypt. It has a 4 km^{2} (1.5 mi^{2}) lake containing brackish water, salt marshes and a reed swamp.

== Geography ==
The Qattara Depression is about 133 metres (436 ft) below sea level and is shaped like a teardrop, with Moghra Oasis in its northeastern corner. The floor of the Depression consists of salt marshes and dry lake beds that flood occasionally, accompanied by large areas of windblown sand. Moghra Oasis consists of a 4 km^{2} (1.5 mi^{2}) lake containing brackish water some 38 metres (125 ft) below sea level. Adjoining it are salt marshes and some Phragmites swamps. To the south and west there are sand dunes near the lake and extensive sheets of sand beyond.

== Geology ==
The water rises to the surface from an aquifer in the Nubian sandstone, but its precise source is unclear as the Nubian Sandstone Aquifer System is at great depths in this area. Just to the north of the oasis is a cliff which gives its name to the Moghra Formation, a thick layer of clastic sedimentary rocks with some minor carbonate interbeds. This formation contains fossils of vertebrates and plants; large mammals found here include hyaenodonts Megistotherium and Hyaenaelurus. These fluvial deposits are likely to have come from a river system which opened into the Nile Delta at the Moghra Oasis.

== Ecology ==
To the south of the lake, the saltmarsh gradually merges into saline flats largely devoid of vegetation. There are three main species in this plant community, each dominating its own concentric zone; Zygophyllum album, Nitraria retusa and Tamarix nilotica. The most important variables affecting the distribution and structure of the communities are the moisture content and salinity of the soil.

In the outer zone, where the salinity is low and the surface is friable, small scattered plants of Zygophyllum album occur. In the innermost part of this zone, the plants are larger and more crowded and they sometimes form hummocks. Here they are associated with T. nilotica, Alhagi maurorum and N. retusa. The next zone is dominated by N. retusa which shows a wide range of tolerance to moisture and salinity conditions. Among sand dunes it forms hummocks and plays an important role in stabilising dunes. In the outer fringes of the zone it is associated with Z. album and T. nilotica while on the inner fringes, where the water table is high but the soil has a low salinity level, the community includes Phragmites australis, Juncus rigidus, Sporobolus spicatus and Z. album. The T. nilotica dominated area forms a scrub community on the outer fringes of the dune zone surrounding the salt flats, where it is associated with A. maurorum, Cressa cretica, N. retusa and Z album. There are a few abandoned groves of date palms in the sandy areas.
