= Ornativalva tamariciella =

Scientific classification
- Domain: Eukaryota
- Kingdom: Animalia
- Phylum: Arthropoda
- Class: Insecta
- Order: Lepidoptera
- Family: Gelechiidae
- Genus: Ornativalva
- Species: O. tamariciella

Binomial name
- Ornativalva tamariciella (Zeller, 1850)

Synonyms
- Gelechia tamariciella Zeller, 1850; Ornativalva tamaricella

Species of moth

Ornativalva tamariciella is a moth of the family Gelechiidae. It was described by Zeller in 1850. It is found in northern Italy, Croatia, and possibly Saudi Arabia, but the latter records may represent Ornativalva heluanensis.

The wingspan is about 10–11.5 mm (0.39–0.45 in). Adults have been recorded on wing in May and June. The larvae feed on Tamarix species, including Tamarix gallica.
