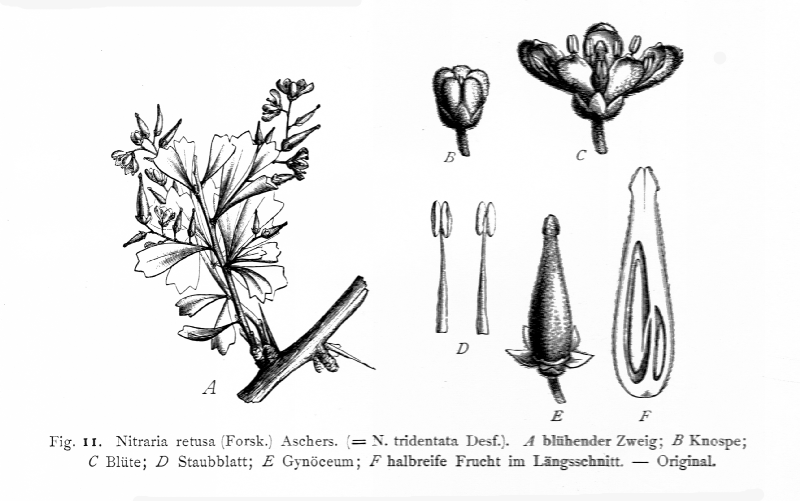
- N. retusa, from Vegetation der Erde (1910)

Scientific classification
- Kingdom: Plantae
- Clade: Embryophytes
- Clade: Tracheophytes
- Clade: Spermatophytes
- Clade: Angiosperms
- Clade: Eudicots
- Clade: Rosids
- Order: Sapindales
- Family: Nitrariaceae
- Genus: Nitraria
- Species: N. retusa

Binomial name
- Nitraria retusa (Forssk.) Asch.

Synonyms
- Berberis africana Hebenstr. & Ludw. ex Schult. & Schult.f. Nitraria senegalensis Poir. Nitraria sericea Jaub. & Spach; Nitraria tridentata Desf. Peganum retusum Forssk.

= Nitraria retusa =

Species of plant in the family Nitrariaceae

Nitraria retusa, commonly known as nitre bush, is a salt-tolerant and drought-resistant shrub in the family Nitrariaceae. It can grow to heights of 2.5 metres (8 ft 2 in), although it rarely exceeds more than 1 m in height. It produces white/green coloured flowers and small red fruit.

The plant is native to desert areas of northern Africa, where it grows in primary succession on barren sand dunes. It also grows in areas with high salinity such as salt marshes.

== Description ==
Nitraria retusa is a bush growing to a maximum height of about 2.5 m (8 ft). The twigs are furry when young, with the bluish-grey fleshy leaves being alternate, wedge or sickle-shaped, with entire margins and measuring 10 to 15 mm (0.4 to 0.6 in) by 8 to 10 mm (0.3 to 0.4 in).

The small, sweetly-scented, whitish or greenish flowers have short pedicels and parts in fives. The fruit is a triangular drupe, 5 to 10 mm (0.2 to 0.4 in) in diameter.

== Distribution and habitat ==
This plant is native to North and East Africa, the Arabian Peninsula and the Middle East. It typically grows in salt marshes and semi-arid saline areas of deserts and it can help in the stabilisation of loose soils. It grows in primary succession on barren sand dunes.

== Ecology ==
In the Moghra Oasis, N. retusa plays an important role in the stabilisation of sand dunes. Here it is the dominant plant in some zones, forming hummocks known as nabkhas, where windblown materials heap up at the base of the plants. It shows a range of tolerances toward soil salinity and the availability of water. Near the lake, where salinity is low and the water table high, it associates with the sea rush, the common reed, salt grass and Zygophyllum album. At the outer fringe of the vegetated zone, where the salinity is high and the water table deep, it grows with Z. album and the Nile tamarisk.

Wildlife eat the fruit and help spread the seeds.

== Uses ==
The fruit turns red as it ripens and is enjoyed by humans. Camels and goats feed on the succulent leaves of this plant and desert-dwellers have used it as a source of salt. The wood is used for fuel and the fruits are sometimes used to make an intoxicating drink.

N. retusa is one of a number of salt-tolerant plants that are being investigated as potential fodder crops for livestock.
