= Ornativalva kalahariensis =

Scientific classification
- Kingdom: Animalia
- Phylum: Arthropoda
- Class: Insecta
- Order: Lepidoptera
- Family: Gelechiidae
- Genus: Ornativalva
- Species: O. kalahariensis

Binomial name
- Ornativalva kalahariensis (Janse, 1960)

Synonyms
- Pelostola kalahariensis Janse, 1960

Species of moth

Ornativalva kalahariensis is a moth of the family Gelechiidae. It was described by Anthonie Johannes Theodorus Janse in 1960. It is found in Namibia and South Africa.

Adults have been recorded on wing in January, April and November.

The larvae feed on Tamarix usneoides.
