= Beach daisy =

Beach daisy may refer to the following plant species:

- Arctotheca populifolia
- Erigeron glaucus
- Wollastonia biflora
