= Ornativalva macrosignella =

Scientific classification
- Kingdom: Animalia
- Phylum: Arthropoda
- Class: Insecta
- Order: Lepidoptera
- Family: Gelechiidae
- Genus: Ornativalva
- Species: O. macrosignella

Binomial name
- Ornativalva macrosignella Sattler, 1967

Species of moth

Ornativalva macrosignella is a moth of the family Gelechiidae. It was described by Sattler in 1967. It is found in Algeria, Tunisia, Egypt, Sudan, Israel and southern Iran (Luristan).

Adults have been recorded on wing from February to July.

The larvae feed on Tamarix tetragyna and Tamarix nilotica.
