= Ornativalva grisea =

Scientific classification
- Domain: Eukaryota
- Kingdom: Animalia
- Phylum: Arthropoda
- Class: Insecta
- Order: Lepidoptera
- Family: Gelechiidae
- Genus: Ornativalva
- Species: O. grisea

Binomial name
- Ornativalva grisea Sattler, 1967

Species of moth

Ornativalva grisea is a moth of the family Gelechiidae. It was described by Sattler in 1967. It is found in Afghanistan and China (Xinjiang).

The wingspan is 16–17 mm. Adults have been recorded on wing from May to July.
