= Ornativalva longiductella =

Scientific classification
- Kingdom: Animalia
- Phylum: Arthropoda
- Class: Insecta
- Order: Lepidoptera
- Family: Gelechiidae
- Genus: Ornativalva
- Species: O. longiductella

Binomial name
- Ornativalva longiductella Sattler, 1967

Species of moth

Ornativalva longiductella is a moth of the family Gelechiidae. It was described by Sattler in 1967. It is found in Algeria, Tunisia, Sudan, Iraq, Afghanistan and Mongolia.

Adults have been recorded on wing from February to April, in June, July and October.
