= Ornativalva cerostomatella =

Scientific classification
- Domain: Eukaryota
- Kingdom: Animalia
- Phylum: Arthropoda
- Class: Insecta
- Order: Lepidoptera
- Family: Gelechiidae
- Genus: Ornativalva
- Species: O. cerostomatella

Binomial name
- Ornativalva cerostomatella (Walsingham, 1904)

Synonyms
- Gelechia cerostomatella Walsingham, 1904; Gelechia tripartitella Mabille, 1907; Gelechia cerostomella Meyrick, 1925; Gelechia biclavata Meyrick, 1934

Species of moth

Ornativalva cerostomatella is a moth of the family Gelechiidae. It was described by Thomas de Grey, 6th Baron Walsingham, in 1904. It is found in Mauritania, Algeria, Tunisia, Egypt, Saudi Arabia and India.

The wingspan is 5–6 mm. The forewings have a dark smoky brownish fuscous band that runs from the middle of the base to the apex and termen, slightly widening outward, its edges clearly defined and without irregularities, below it the dorsum is pale fawn including the whole space beneath the fold, except where a few scales of the dark band above slightly overlap it toward the base. The costal area, which is narrow at the base and slightly widening outward, is pale pinkish ochreous, except the extreme costa which is nearly white, very narrowly so, but rather more conspicuously, where it includes the costal cilia. At the apical end of the dark brown band is a slight bronzy patch, shining in some lights. The hindwings are pale iridescent rosy grey. Adults have been recorded on wing from February to August.
