= Ornativalva serratisignella =

Scientific classification
- Kingdom: Animalia
- Phylum: Arthropoda
- Class: Insecta
- Order: Lepidoptera
- Family: Gelechiidae
- Genus: Ornativalva
- Species: O. serratisignella

Binomial name
- Ornativalva serratisignella Sattler, 1967

Species of moth

Ornativalva serratisignella is a moth of the family Gelechiidae. It was described by Sattler in 1967. It is found in Sudan, Iraq and Iran (Luristan, Baluchistan).

Adults have been recorded on wing in February, April, May and September.

The host plant is unknown, but might be a Tamarix species.
