= Ornativalva heluanensis =

Scientific classification
- Kingdom: Animalia
- Phylum: Arthropoda
- Class: Insecta
- Order: Lepidoptera
- Family: Gelechiidae
- Genus: Ornativalva
- Species: O. heluanensis

Binomial name
- Ornativalva heluanensis (Debski, 1913)

Synonyms
- Teleia heluanensis Debski, 1913; Teleia frankeniivorella Chrétien, 1917; Teleja oasicolella Turati, 1924; Lita siculella Mariani, 1937

Species of moth

Ornativalva heluanensis is a moth of the family Gelechiidae. It was described by Debski in 1913. It is found in Spain, Croatia, Ukraine and Russia, as well as on the Canary Islands, Sicily, Malta and Cyprus. Outside Europe, it is found in North Africa (Morocco, Algeria, Tunisia, Libya, Egypt), Sudan, Israel, Syria, Turkey, Saudi Arabia, Iraq, Iran, Afghanistan, Pakistan and Mongolia.

The wingspan is about 10 mm.

The larvae feed on Frankenia pallida, Tamarix tetragyna and Tamarix nilotica.
