= Ornativalva zhongningensis =

Scientific classification
- Domain: Eukaryota
- Kingdom: Animalia
- Phylum: Arthropoda
- Class: Insecta
- Order: Lepidoptera
- Family: Gelechiidae
- Genus: Ornativalva
- Species: O. zhongningensis

Binomial name
- Ornativalva zhongningensis H.-H. Li, 1994

Species of moth

Ornativalva zhongningensis is a moth of the family Gelechiidae. It was described by Hou-Hun Li in 1994. It is found in China.
