= Ornativalva caecigena =

Scientific classification
- Kingdom: Animalia
- Phylum: Arthropoda
- Class: Insecta
- Order: Lepidoptera
- Family: Gelechiidae
- Genus: Ornativalva
- Species: O. caecigena

Binomial name
- Ornativalva caecigena (Meyrick, 1918)

Synonyms
- Gelechia caecigena Meyrick, 1918

Species of moth

Ornativalva caecigena is a moth of the family Gelechiidae. It was described by Edward Meyrick in 1918. It is found in Saudi Arabia, Kuwait, southern Iran (Luristan) and Pakistan.

The wingspan is about 11 mm. The forewings are whitish grey irrorated (sprinkled) with rather dark fuscous and with oblique fasciae of rather dark fuscous suffusion from the costa near the base and before one-third, indistinct costally but expanded in the disc and not reaching below the fold, each margined anteriorly by two or three small tufts of scales. The discal stigmata are cloudy, dark fuscous and approximated, the second followed by a blotch of rather dark fuscous suffusion, a similar blotch on the costa between and nearly reaching them. There is a tuft of scales beneath the second discal stigma, and one on the dorsum rather before this. Some irregular dark clouding is found towards the apex. The hindwings are pale bluish grey. Adults have been recorded on wing from March to May.
