= Ornativalva mongolica =

Scientific classification
- Kingdom: Animalia
- Phylum: Arthropoda
- Class: Insecta
- Order: Lepidoptera
- Family: Gelechiidae
- Genus: Ornativalva
- Species: O. mongolica

Binomial name
- Ornativalva mongolica Sattler, 1967

Species of moth

Ornativalva mongolica is a moth of the family Gelechiidae. It was described by Sattler in 1967. It is found in Mongolia.

Adults have been recorded on wing from June to July.

The host plant is unknown, but might be a Tamarix species.
