= Ornativalva alces =

Scientific classification
- Domain: Eukaryota
- Kingdom: Animalia
- Phylum: Arthropoda
- Class: Insecta
- Order: Lepidoptera
- Family: Gelechiidae
- Genus: Ornativalva
- Species: O. alces

Binomial name
- Ornativalva alces Bidzilya, 2009

Species of moth

Ornativalva alces is a moth of the family Gelechiidae. It was described by Oleksiy V. Bidzilya in 2009. It is found in Uzbekistan.
