= Ornativalva pharaonis =

Scientific classification
- Kingdom: Animalia
- Phylum: Arthropoda
- Class: Insecta
- Order: Lepidoptera
- Family: Gelechiidae
- Genus: Ornativalva
- Species: O. pharaonis

Binomial name
- Ornativalva pharaonis Sattler, 1967

Species of moth

Ornativalva pharaonis is a moth of the family Gelechiidae. It was described by Sattler in 1967. It is found in Tunisia, Libya, Egypt, Sudan and Israel.

Adults have been recorded on wing in March and from June to November.

The larvae feed on Tamarix species, including Tamarix aphylla. They have been recorded inhabiting galls created by Eriophyes tlaiae.
