= Ornativalva xinjiangensis =

Scientific classification
- Kingdom: Animalia
- Phylum: Arthropoda
- Class: Insecta
- Order: Lepidoptera
- Family: Gelechiidae
- Genus: Ornativalva
- Species: O. xinjiangensis

Binomial name
- Ornativalva xinjiangensis H.-H. Li, 1991

Species of moth

Ornativalva xinjiangensis is a moth of the family Gelechiidae. It was described by Hou-Hun Li in 1991. It is found in China.
