= Ornativalva frontella =

Scientific classification
- Kingdom: Animalia
- Phylum: Arthropoda
- Class: Insecta
- Order: Lepidoptera
- Family: Gelechiidae
- Genus: Ornativalva
- Species: O. frontella

Binomial name
- Ornativalva frontella Sattler, 1976

Species of moth

Ornativalva frontella is a moth of the family Gelechiidae. It was described by Sattler in 1976. It is found in Mongolia.

Adults have been recorded on wing in June and July.

The host plant is unknown, but might be a Tamarix species.
