= Ornativalva sieversi =

Scientific classification
- Domain: Eukaryota
- Kingdom: Animalia
- Phylum: Arthropoda
- Class: Insecta
- Order: Lepidoptera
- Family: Gelechiidae
- Genus: Ornativalva
- Species: O. sieversi

Binomial name
- Ornativalva sieversi (Staudinger, 1871)

Synonyms
- Gelechia sieversi Staudinger, 1871

Species of moth

Ornativalva sieversi is a moth of the family Gelechiidae. It was described by Otto Staudinger in 1871. It is found in southern and central European Russia, Iran and Afghanistan.

The wingspan is 15–17 mm.

The host plant is unknown, but might be a Tamarix species.
