= Ornativalva arabica =

Scientific classification
- Kingdom: Animalia
- Phylum: Arthropoda
- Class: Insecta
- Order: Lepidoptera
- Family: Gelechiidae
- Genus: Ornativalva
- Species: O. arabica

Binomial name
- Ornativalva arabica Sattler, 1967

Species of moth

Ornativalva arabica is a moth of the family Gelechiidae. It was described by Sattler in 1967. It is found in Saudi Arabia and Sudan.

Adults have been recorded on wing from February to April, in August, November and December.
