= Ornativalva acutivalva =

Scientific classification
- Kingdom: Animalia
- Phylum: Arthropoda
- Class: Insecta
- Order: Lepidoptera
- Family: Gelechiidae
- Genus: Ornativalva
- Species: O. acutivalva

Binomial name
- Ornativalva acutivalva Sattler, 1976

Species of moth

Ornativalva acutivalva is a moth of the family Gelechiidae. It was described by Sattler in 1976. It is found in Mongolia.

The wingspan is 5–6 mm. Adults have been recorded on wing in July.

The host plant is unknown, but might be a Tamarix species.
