= Ornativalva cerva =

Scientific classification
- Kingdom: Animalia
- Phylum: Arthropoda
- Clade: Pancrustacea
- Class: Insecta
- Order: Lepidoptera
- Family: Gelechiidae
- Genus: Ornativalva
- Species: O. cerva

Binomial name
- Ornativalva cerva Bidzilya, 2009

Species of moth

Ornativalva cerva is a moth of the family Gelechiidae. It was described by Oleksiy V. Bidzilya in 2009. It is found in Uzbekistan.
