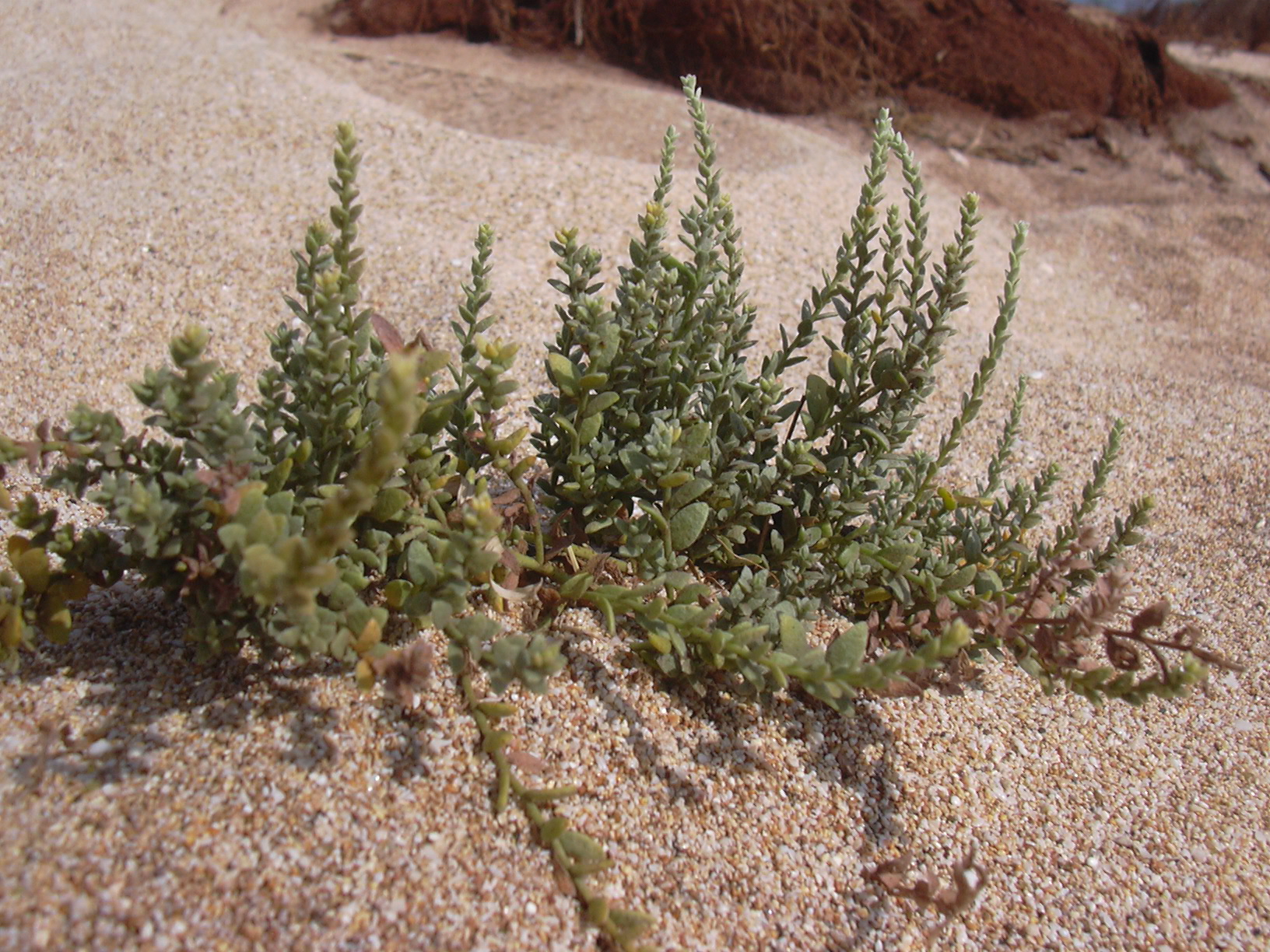
- Cressa truxillensis

Scientific classification
- Kingdom: Plantae
- Clade: Tracheophytes
- Clade: Angiosperms
- Clade: Eudicots
- Clade: Asterids
- Order: Solanales
- Family: Convolvulaceae
- Tribe: Cresseae
- Genus: Cressa; L.

Type species
- Cressa cretica

Species
- See text

= Cressa (plant) =

Genus of flowering plants

Cressa is a genus of plants in the morning glory family known generally as alkaliweeds. These plants are native to the tropical and subtropical areas of the world. They are clumpy and low-growing but usually have erect stems covered white-haired, green leaves. They produce tiny white flowers about half a centimeter across.

There are four species recognised in the genus Cressa:

- Cressa australis
- Cressa cretica
- Cressa nudicaulis
- Cressa truxillensis
