= Ornativalva ignota =

Scientific classification
- Kingdom: Animalia
- Phylum: Arthropoda
- Clade: Pancrustacea
- Class: Insecta
- Order: Lepidoptera
- Family: Gelechiidae
- Genus: Ornativalva
- Species: O. ignota

Binomial name
- Ornativalva ignota Sattler, 1967

Species of moth

Ornativalva ignota is a moth of the family Gelechiidae. It was described by Sattler in 1967. It is found in Algeria.

Adults have been recorded on wing in March, July and September.

The larvae feed on Tamarix species.
