= Ornativalva heligmatodes =

Scientific classification
- Domain: Eukaryota
- Kingdom: Animalia
- Phylum: Arthropoda
- Class: Insecta
- Order: Lepidoptera
- Family: Gelechiidae
- Genus: Ornativalva
- Species: O. heligmatodes

Binomial name
- Ornativalva heligmatodes (Walsingham, 1904)

Synonyms
- Gelechia heligmatodes Walsingham, 1904; Teleja heligmatodes auctella Turati, 1927

Species of moth

Ornativalva heligmatodes is a moth of the family Gelechiidae. It was described by Thomas de Grey, 6th Baron Walsingham, in 1904. It is found in Algeria and Tunisia.

The wingspan is 14–15 mm The forewings are greyish fuscous through a profuse sprinkling of hoary cinereous scales upon a dark ground colour. The dorsum from the base to the tornus is bright ochreous, this colour throwing a slight angular projection across the middle of the fold, where it is clearly defined against the rather intensified dark shade above it, which is thus thrown into two obtuse angles. This bright ochreous colour shows also below the costa near the base, and along the termen, especially toward the apex, and is again noticeable on either side of a black dot about the lower angle of the cell, touching the upper corner of a rather brownish patch above the tornus which blends with the greyish fuscous shading above it in which there are three short whitish ochreous ill-defined costal spots before the apes. The hindwings are grey, with a brownish tinge. Adults have been recorded on wing from March to June and in August.
