= Ornativalva =

Scientific classification
- Kingdom: Animalia
- Phylum: Arthropoda
- Clade: Pancrustacea
- Class: Insecta
- Order: Lepidoptera
- Family: Gelechiidae
- Subfamily: Anomologinae
- Genus: Ornativalva; Gozmány, 1955

Synonyms
- Pelostola Janse, 1960

Genus of moths

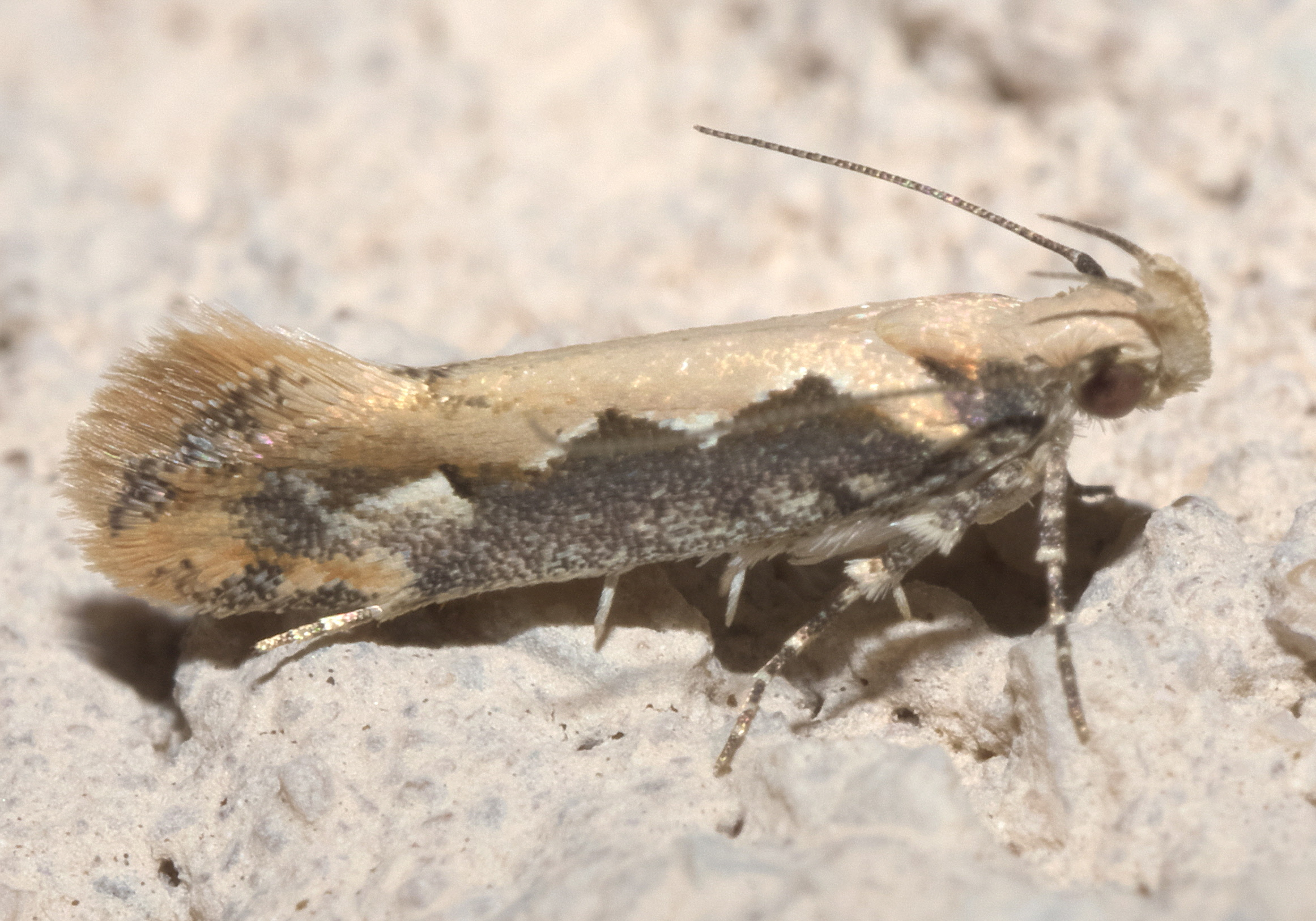
Ornativalva erubescens, Twirler Moths.

Ornativalva is a genus of moths in the family Gelechiidae.

== Species ==
Heluanensis species-group

- Ornativalva heluanensis (Debski, 1913)
- Ornativalva longiductella Sattler, 1967
- Ornativalva rufipuncta Sattler, 1976
- Ornativalva roseosuffusella Sattler, 1967
- Ornativalva zonella (Chrétien, 1917)

Erubescens species-group

- Ornativalva levifrons Sattler, 1976
- Ornativalva erubescens (Walsingham, 1904)
- Ornativalva lilyella (Lucas, 1943)
- Ornativalva aspera Sattler, 1976
- Ornativalva pulchella Sattler, 1976
- Ornativalva frontella Sattler, 1976
- Ornativalva arabica Sattler, 1967
- Ornativalva sesostrella (Rebel, 1912)
- Ornativalva ignota Sattler, 1967

Ornatella species-group

- Ornativalva ochraceofusca Sattler, 1967
- Ornativalva ornatella Sattler, 1967
- Ornativalva sinica Li, 1991
- Ornativalva zepuensis Li & Zheng, 1995
- Ornativalva miniscula Li & Zheng, 1995

Plicella species-group

- Ornativalva plicella Sattler, 1976
- Ornativalva undella Sattler, 1976
- Ornativalva xinjiangensis Li, 1991
- Ornativalva pharaonis Sattler, 1967

Tamariciella species-group

- Ornativalva indica Sattler, 1967
- Ornativalva misma Sattler, 1976
- Ornativalva serratisignella Sattler, 1967
- Ornativalva caecigena (Meyrick, 1918)
- Ornativalva macrosignella Sattler, 1967
- Ornativalva heligmatodes (Walsingham, 1904)
- Ornativalva tamariciella (Zeller, 1850)
- Ornativalva pseudotamariciella Sattler, 1967
- Ornativalva kalahariensis (Janse, 1960)
- Ornativalva sattleri Li & Zheng, 1995

Plutelliformis species-group

- Ornativalva triangulella Sattler, 1967
- Ornativalva antipyramis (Meyrick, 1925)
- Ornativalva singula Sattler, 1967
- Ornativalva basistriga Sattler, 1976
- Ornativalva plutelliformis (Staudinger, 1859)
- Ornativalva grisea Sattler, 1967
- Ornativalva sieversi (Staudinger, 1871)

Cerostomatella species-group

- Ornativalva mixolitha (Meyrick, 1918)
- Ornativalva angulatella (Chrétien, 1915)
- Ornativalva cornifrons Sattler, 1976
- Ornativalva cerostomatella (Walsingham, 1904)
- Ornativalva mongolica Sattler, 1967
- Ornativalva novicornifrons Li, 1994
- Ornativalva zhengi Li, 1994
- Ornativalva zhongningensis Li, 1994
- Ornativalva afghana Sattler, 1967
- Ornativalva curvella Sattler, 1976
- Ornativalva acutivalva Sattler, 1976
- Ornativalva cerva Bidzilya, 2009

incertae sedis

- Ornativalva alces Bidzilya, 2009
- Ornativalva aurantiacella (Turati, 1927)
- Ornativalva zangezurica Piskunov, [1978]
