= Ornativalva miniscula =

Scientific classification
- Domain: Eukaryota
- Kingdom: Animalia
- Phylum: Arthropoda
- Class: Insecta
- Order: Lepidoptera
- Family: Gelechiidae
- Genus: Ornativalva
- Species: O. miniscula

Binomial name
- Ornativalva miniscula H.-H. Li & Z.-M. Zheng, 1995

Species of moth

Ornativalva miniscula is a moth of the family Gelechiidae. It was described by Hou-Hun Li and Zhe-Min Zheng in 1995. It is found in Xinjiang, China.

The wingspan is about 11 mm for both males and females.
