= Ornativalva angulatella =

Scientific classification
- Domain: Eukaryota
- Kingdom: Animalia
- Phylum: Arthropoda
- Class: Insecta
- Order: Lepidoptera
- Family: Gelechiidae
- Genus: Ornativalva
- Species: O. angulatella

Binomial name
- Ornativalva angulatella (Chrétien, 1915)

Synonyms
- Gelechia angulatella Chrétien, 1915; Gelechia nigrosubvittatella Lucas, 1933

Species of moth

Ornativalva angulatella is a moth of the family Gelechiidae. It was described by Pierre Chrétien in 1915. It is found in Algeria and Tunisia.

The wingspan is about 14 mm. Adults have been recorded on wing from March to June and in October.
