= Ornativalva pseudotamariciella =

Scientific classification
- Kingdom: Animalia
- Phylum: Arthropoda
- Clade: Pancrustacea
- Class: Insecta
- Order: Lepidoptera
- Family: Gelechiidae
- Genus: Ornativalva
- Species: O. pseudotamariciella

Binomial name
- Ornativalva pseudotamariciella Sattler, 1967

Synonyms
- Ornativalva pseudotamaricella

Species of moth

Ornativalva pseudotamariciella is a moth of the family Gelechiidae. It was described by Sattler in 1967. It is found in Portugal, Spain, Italy and southern France.

Adults have been recorded on wing from May to July and in September.

The larvae feed on the leaves and flowers of Tamarix gallica and Tamarix africana.
