= Ornativalva antipyramis =

Scientific classification
- Kingdom: Animalia
- Phylum: Arthropoda
- Class: Insecta
- Order: Lepidoptera
- Family: Gelechiidae
- Genus: Ornativalva
- Species: O. antipyramis

Binomial name
- Ornativalva antipyramis (Meyrick, 1925)

Synonyms
- Gelechia antipyramis Meyrick, 1925

Species of moth

Ornativalva antipyramis is a moth of the family Gelechiidae. It was described by Edward Meyrick in 1925. It is found on the Cape Verde islands, the Canary Islands, as well as in Morocco, Algeria, Tunisia, Libya, Egypt, Sudan, Yemen (Socotra), Jordan, Saudi Arabia, southern Iran (Luristan) and Pakistan.

The wingspan is about 15 mm. Adults have been recorded on wing from February to July and in October.

The larvae feed on Tamarix species.
