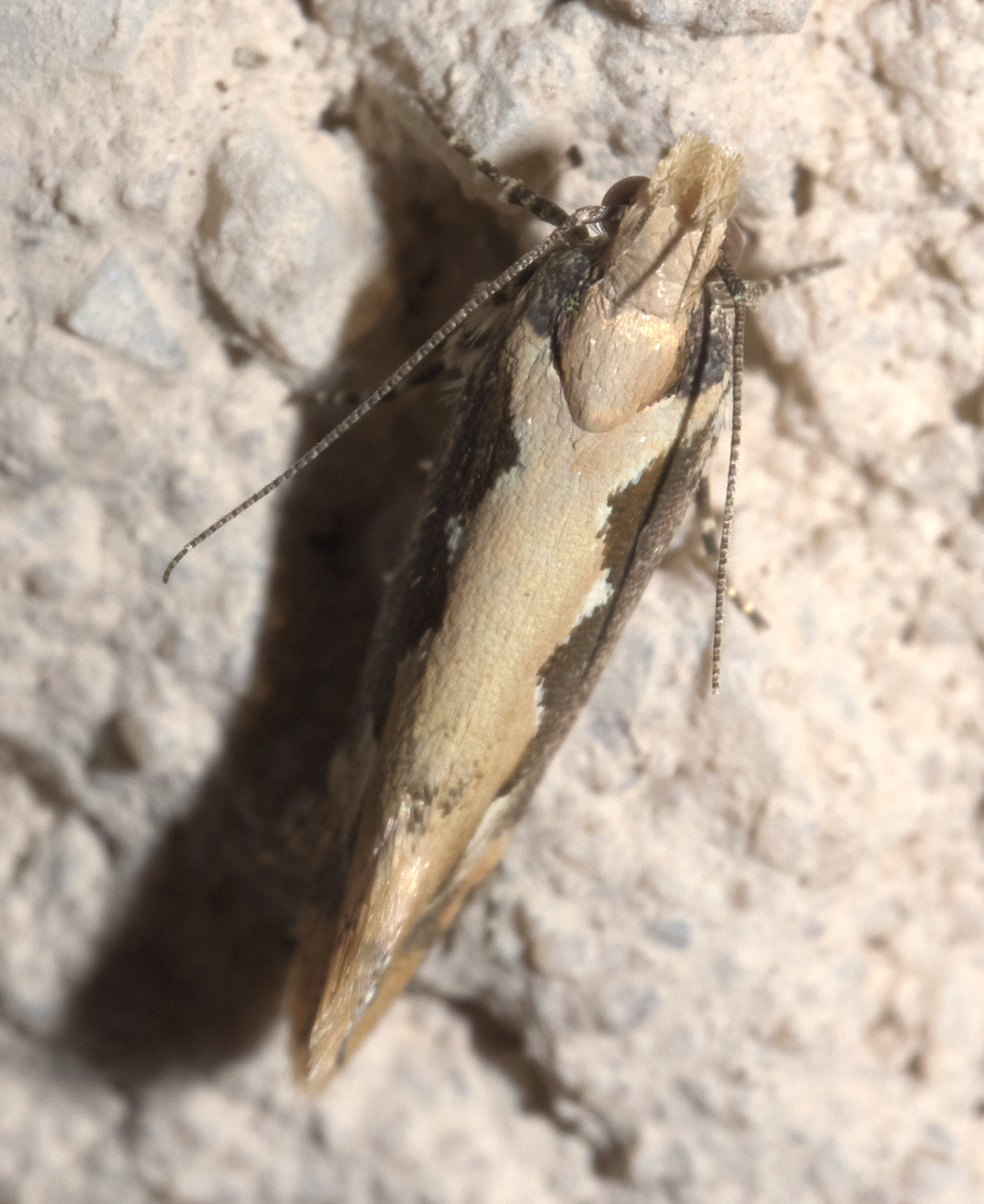

Scientific classification
- Domain: Eukaryota
- Kingdom: Animalia
- Phylum: Arthropoda
- Class: Insecta
- Order: Lepidoptera
- Family: Gelechiidae
- Genus: Ornativalva
- Species: O. erubescens

Binomial name
- Ornativalva erubescens (Walsingham, 1904)

Synonyms
- Gelechia erubescens Walsingham, 1904

= Ornativalva erubescens =

Species of moth

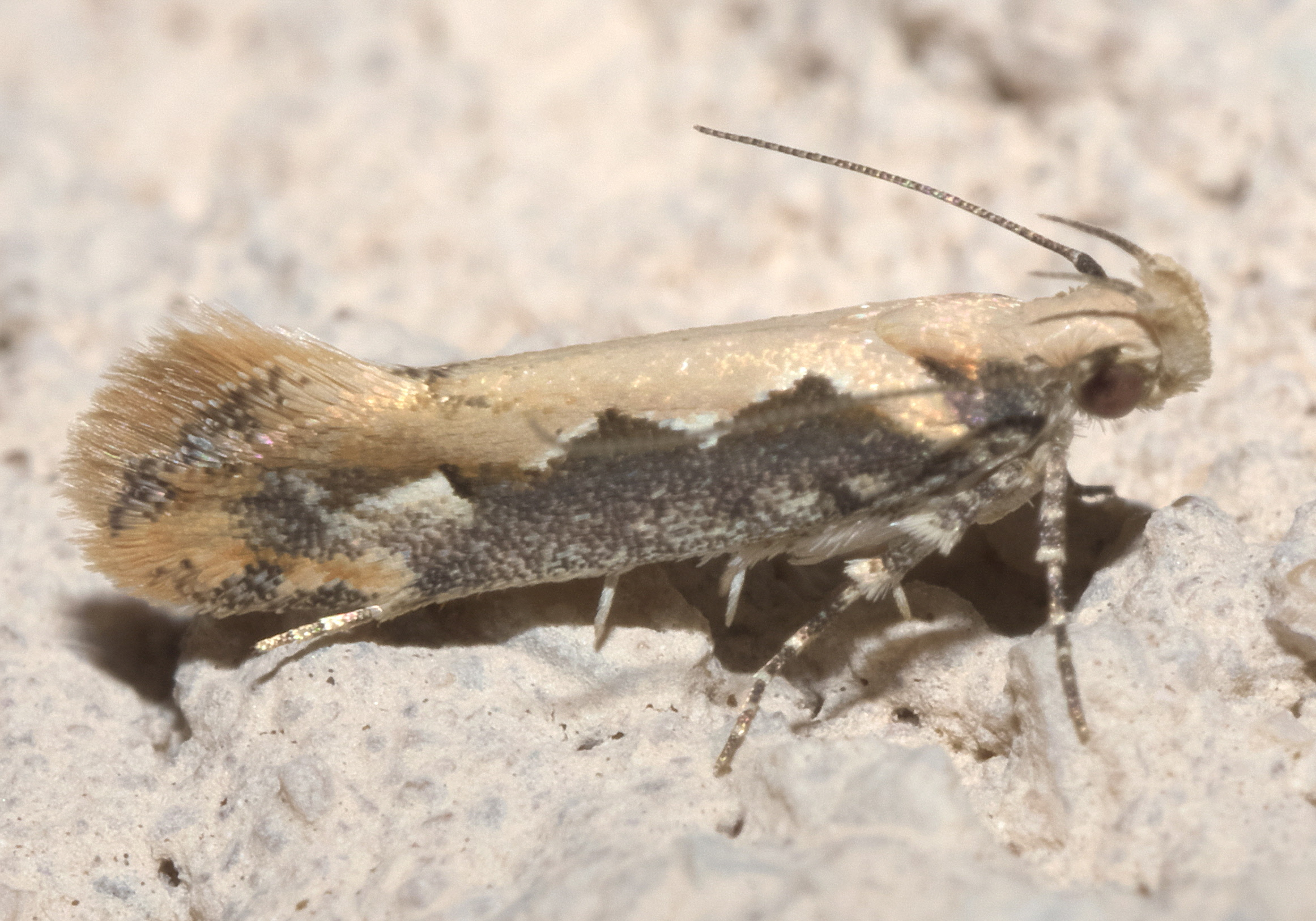
Ornativalva erubescens

Ornativalva erubescens is a moth of the family Gelechiidae. It was described by Thomas de Grey, 6th Baron Walsingham, in 1904. It is found in Morocco, Algeria, Tunisia, Libya, Egypt, Sudan, Israel, Saudi Arabia, Iran, Pakistan, and the southwestern U.S.

The wingspan is 17–18 mm. The forewings are whitish ochreous, suffused along the costa, as far as two-thirds from the base, with bright rosy red. Between these two colours is a band of olive-grey, running as far as the end of the cell, with two rectangular projections thrown downwards into the paler space beneath it, these being darker, more inclining to fuscous, than the upper portion of the streak with which they blend. At the end of this streak is an oblique blackish spot, preceding a space of the whitish ochreous ground-colour, narrowly margined at its lower edge with brownish fuscous. On the flexus is a narrow short black streak, on the pale costal third are two small aggregations of brownish fuscous scales within the basal third, and three larger aggregations on the costa and costal cilia in the outer third, two similar groups of scales occurring in the cilia below the apex. The hindwings are rather iridescent, grey, with a brownish tinge. Adults have been recorded on wing in January, May, August and November.
