= Ornativalva mixolitha =

Scientific classification
- Kingdom: Animalia
- Phylum: Arthropoda
- Class: Insecta
- Order: Lepidoptera
- Family: Gelechiidae
- Genus: Ornativalva
- Species: O. mixolitha

Binomial name
- Ornativalva mixolitha (Meyrick, 1918)

Synonyms
- Phthorimaea mixolitha Meyrick, 1918

Species of moth

Ornativalva mixolitha is a moth of the family Gelechiidae. It was described by Edward Meyrick in 1918. It is found in Morocco, Algeria, Tunisia, southern Russia, Turkey, Sudan, Iraq, Iran, Afghanistan, Pakistan, India (Bihar) and Mongolia.

The wingspan is about 10 mm. The forewings are white sprinkled and irregularly blotched with dark grey, especially posteriorly. There is a distinct elongate dark grey spot on the costa before two-thirds and suffused dark fuscous spots on the fold at one-sixth and one-third of the wing. The discal stigmata are cloudy, blackish, the first in middle, with a yellow-ochreous spot adjacent beneath. The grey tornal area is ochreous tinged. The hindwings are light grey. Adults have been recorded on wing from February to October and in October.

The host plant is unknown, but might be a Tamarix species.

== Subspecies ==
- Ornativalva mixolitha mixolitha (southern Russia, Turkey, Sudan, Iraq, Iran, Afghanistan, Pakistan, India (Bihar), Mongolia)
- Ornativalva mixolitha bipunctella Sattler, 1967 (Morocco, Algeria, Tunisia)
