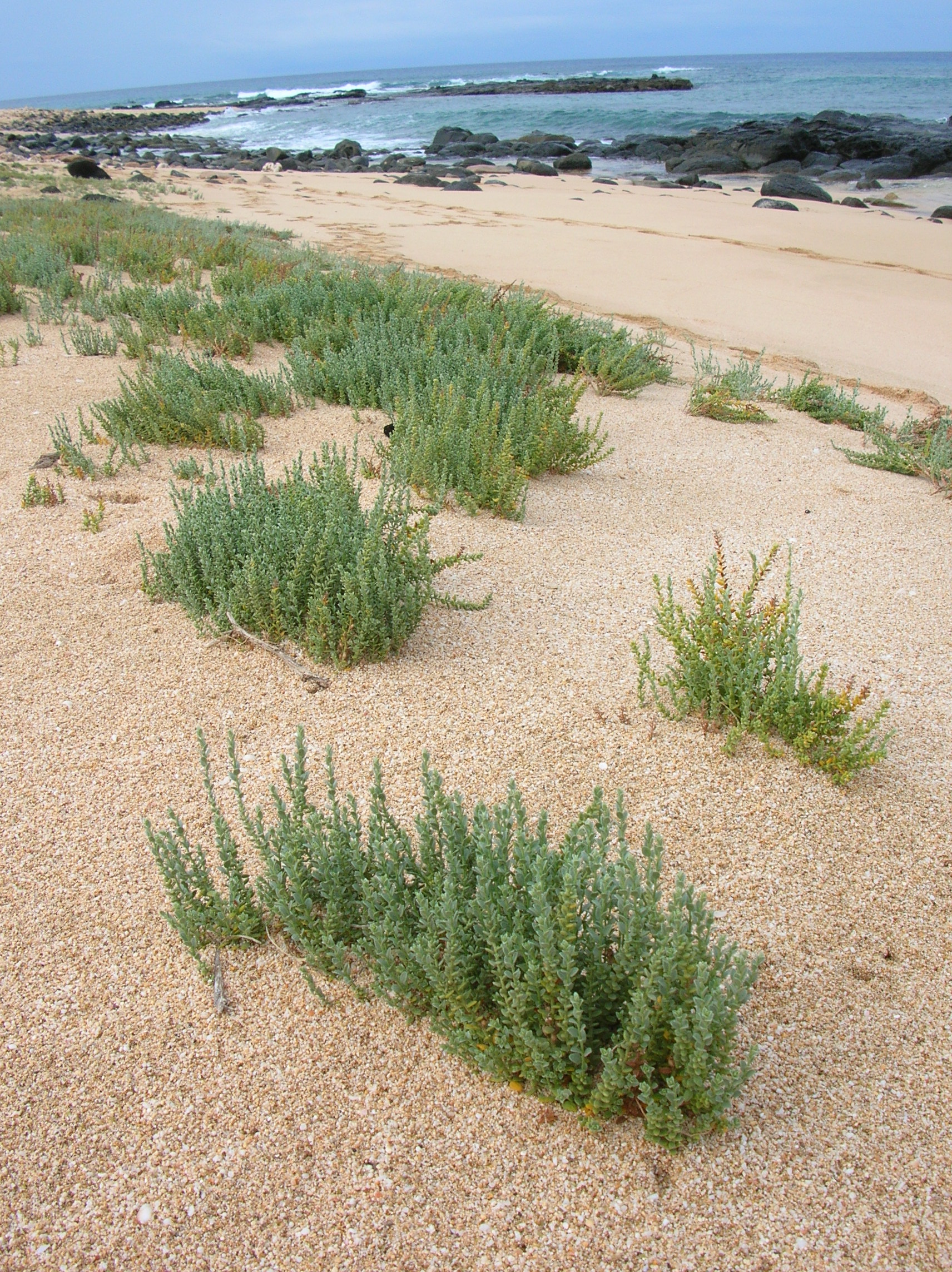

Scientific classification
- Kingdom: Plantae
- Clade: Tracheophytes
- Clade: Angiosperms
- Clade: Eudicots
- Clade: Asterids
- Order: Solanales
- Family: Convolvulaceae
- Genus: Cressa
- Species: C. truxillensis

Binomial name
- Cressa truxillensis Kunth

= Cressa truxillensis =

Species of flowering plant

Cressa truxillensis is a species of flowering plant in the morning glory family known by the common name spreading alkaliweed. It is native to the western United States and Mexico, where it grows in habitat with saline or alkaline soils, such as beaches, desert flats, and playas.

This is a perennial herb producing an erect stem with many branches up to about 25 cm (10 in) tall. The clump of stems is densely lined with silky hairs and studded with many small hairy oval leaves, each under a centimeter long. Flowers appear in the axils of the uppermost leaves. Each has a white corolla with five pointed lobes surrounded by hairy green sepals. There are five protruding stamens and two styles.
