= Ornativalva zangezurica =

Scientific classification
- Kingdom: Animalia
- Phylum: Arthropoda
- Clade: Pancrustacea
- Class: Insecta
- Order: Lepidoptera
- Family: Gelechiidae
- Genus: Ornativalva
- Species: O. zangezurica

Binomial name
- Ornativalva zangezurica Piskunov, [1978]

Species of moth

Ornativalva zangezurica is a moth of the family Gelechiidae. It was described by Piskunov in 1978. It is found in Armenia.
