= Ornativalva plicella =

Scientific classification
- Kingdom: Animalia
- Phylum: Arthropoda
- Class: Insecta
- Order: Lepidoptera
- Family: Gelechiidae
- Genus: Ornativalva
- Species: O. plicella

Binomial name
- Ornativalva plicella Sattler, 1976

Species of moth

Ornativalva plicella is a moth of the family Gelechiidae. It was described by Sattler in 1976. It is found in southern Iran.

Adults have been recorded on wing in April.
