= Ornativalva roseosuffusella =

Scientific classification
- Kingdom: Animalia
- Phylum: Arthropoda
- Class: Insecta
- Order: Lepidoptera
- Family: Gelechiidae
- Genus: Ornativalva
- Species: O. roseosuffusella

Binomial name
- Ornativalva roseosuffusella Sattler, 1967

Species of moth

Ornativalva roseosuffusella is a moth of the family Gelechiidae. It was described by Sattler in 1967. It is found in western Iran.

Adults have been recorded on wing in March and April.
