= Ornativalva afghana =

Scientific classification
- Kingdom: Animalia
- Phylum: Arthropoda
- Class: Insecta
- Order: Lepidoptera
- Family: Gelechiidae
- Genus: Ornativalva
- Species: O. afghana

Binomial name
- Ornativalva afghana Sattler, 1967

Species of moth

Ornativalva afghana is a moth of the family Gelechiidae. It was described by Sattler in 1967. It is found in Afghanistan and Mongolia.

Adults have been recorded on wing in June.

The host plant is unknown, but might be a Tamarix species.
