= Ornativalva basistriga =

Scientific classification
- Kingdom: Animalia
- Phylum: Arthropoda
- Class: Insecta
- Order: Lepidoptera
- Family: Gelechiidae
- Genus: Ornativalva
- Species: O. basistriga

Binomial name
- Ornativalva basistriga Sattler, 1976

Species of moth

Ornativalva basistriga is a moth of the family Gelechiidae. It was described by Sattler in 1976. It is found in Mongolia.

The wingspan is 6.5–8 mm. Adults have been recorded on wing in June and July.

The host plant is unknown, but might be a Tamarix species.
