= Ornativalva sesostrella =

Scientific classification
- Domain: Eukaryota
- Kingdom: Animalia
- Phylum: Arthropoda
- Class: Insecta
- Order: Lepidoptera
- Family: Gelechiidae
- Genus: Ornativalva
- Species: O. sesostrella

Binomial name
- Ornativalva sesostrella (Rebel, 1912)

Synonyms
- Gelechia sesostrella Rebel, 1912

Species of moth

Ornativalva sesostrella is a moth of the family Gelechiidae. It was described by Hans Rebel in 1912. It is found in Algeria, Tunisia, Egypt, Sudan, Saudi Arabia, southern Iran and Pakistan.

Adults have been recorded on wing from January to August, and in October and November.

The larvae feed on Tamarix species.
