= Ornativalva ochraceofusca =

Scientific classification
- Kingdom: Animalia
- Phylum: Arthropoda
- Class: Insecta
- Order: Lepidoptera
- Family: Gelechiidae
- Genus: Ornativalva
- Species: O. ochraceofusca

Binomial name
- Ornativalva ochraceofusca Sattler, 1967

Species of moth

Ornativalva ochraceofusca is a moth of the family Gelechiidae. It was described by Sattler in 1967. It is found in Turkey and Afghanistan.

Adults have been recorded on wing in June, July and August.

The host plant is unknown, but might be a Tamarix species.
