= Ornativalva aurantiacella =

Scientific classification
- Domain: Eukaryota
- Kingdom: Animalia
- Phylum: Arthropoda
- Class: Insecta
- Order: Lepidoptera
- Family: Gelechiidae
- Genus: Ornativalva
- Species: O. aurantiacella

Binomial name
- Ornativalva aurantiacella (Turati, 1927)

Synonyms
- Paranarsia aurantiacella Turati, 1927

Species of moth

Ornativalva aurantiacella is a moth of the family Gelechiidae. It was described by Turati in 1927. It is found in Libya.
