= Ornativalva indica =

Scientific classification
- Kingdom: Animalia
- Phylum: Arthropoda
- Class: Insecta
- Order: Lepidoptera
- Family: Gelechiidae
- Genus: Ornativalva
- Species: O. indica

Binomial name
- Ornativalva indica Sattler, 1967

Species of moth

Ornativalva indica is a moth of the family Gelechiidae. It was described by Sattler in 1967. It is found in southern Iran (Luristan), Pakistan (Peshawar) and India (Bihar).

Adults have been recorded on wing from May to July.

The larvae feed on Tamarix species, possibly Tamarix indica.
