= Ornativalva misma =

Scientific classification
- Kingdom: Animalia
- Phylum: Arthropoda
- Class: Insecta
- Order: Lepidoptera
- Family: Gelechiidae
- Genus: Ornativalva
- Species: O. misma

Binomial name
- Ornativalva misma Sattler, 1976

Species of moth

Ornativalva misma is a moth of the family Gelechiidae. It was described by Sattler in 1976. It is found in northern Sudan.
