= Ornativalva singula =

Scientific classification
- Kingdom: Animalia
- Phylum: Arthropoda
- Class: Insecta
- Order: Lepidoptera
- Family: Gelechiidae
- Genus: Ornativalva
- Species: O. singula

Binomial name
- Ornativalva singula Sattler, 1967

Species of moth

Ornativalva singula is a moth of the family Gelechiidae. It was described by Sattler in 1967. It is found in Afghanistan and Mongolia.

Adults have been recorded on wing in May and June.

The host plant is unknown, but might be a Tamarix species.
