= Ornativalva lilyella =

Scientific classification
- Kingdom: Animalia
- Phylum: Arthropoda
- Clade: Pancrustacea
- Class: Insecta
- Order: Lepidoptera
- Family: Gelechiidae
- Genus: Ornativalva
- Species: O. lilyella

Binomial name
- Ornativalva lilyella (D. Lucas, 1943)

Synonyms
- Gelechia lilyella D. Lucas, 1943

Species of moth

Ornativalva lilyella is a moth of the family Gelechiidae. It was described by Daniel Lucas in 1943. It is found in Algeria.

Adults have been recorded on wing from February to April and in October.
