= Ornativalva triangulella =

Scientific classification
- Kingdom: Animalia
- Phylum: Arthropoda
- Class: Insecta
- Order: Lepidoptera
- Family: Gelechiidae
- Genus: Ornativalva
- Species: O. triangulella

Binomial name
- Ornativalva triangulella Sattler, 1967

Species of moth

Ornativalva triangulella is a moth of the family Gelechiidae. It was described by Sattler in 1967. It is found in Algeria, Tunisia, Kuwait, Iraq, south-eastern Iran (Baluchistan) and Afghanistan.

Adults have been recorded on wing from March to May and in October.
