= Ornativalva ornatella =

Scientific classification
- Kingdom: Animalia
- Phylum: Arthropoda
- Class: Insecta
- Order: Lepidoptera
- Family: Gelechiidae
- Genus: Ornativalva
- Species: O. ornatella

Binomial name
- Ornativalva ornatella Sattler, 1967

Species of moth

Ornativalva ornatella is a moth of the family Gelechiidae. It was described by Sattler in 1967. It is found in Romania, the southern part of European Russia, Turkey, Iran, Afghanistan and Mongolia.

Adults have been recorded on wing from May to July, and in August. The host plant might be a Tamarix species, but this has not been confirmed.
