= Ornativalva zonella =

Scientific classification
- Domain: Eukaryota
- Kingdom: Animalia
- Phylum: Arthropoda
- Class: Insecta
- Order: Lepidoptera
- Family: Gelechiidae
- Genus: Ornativalva
- Species: O. zonella

Binomial name
- Ornativalva zonella (Chrétien, 1917)

Synonyms
- Teleia zonella Chrétien, 1917; Teleia cimelion Amsel, 1935; Ornativalva iranella Sattler, 1967

Species of moth

Ornativalva zonella is a moth of the family Gelechiidae. It was described by Pierre Chrétien in 1917. It is found in Algeria, Tunisia, Israel, Saudi Arabia, southern Iran and China (Xinjiang).

Adults have been recorded on wing from March to June.
