= Silwa Bahari =

- Location in Egypt
- Coordinates: 24.7389°N 32.9417°E
- Country: Egypt
- Governorate: Aswan
- Time zone: UTC+2 (EET)
  - Summer (DST): UTC+3 (EEST)

Silwa Bahari is a town or large village in Aswan Governorate, Egypt. It is located in the Nile Valley about 30 km (19 mi) north of Kom Ombo and 73 km (45 mi) north of Aswan. The village has a population of about five thousand people. There are rock carvings near the village that are believed to date back to the Seventeenth Dynasty of Egypt, about 1550 BC.

== Community structure ==
Silwa Bahari is a typical rural community in Upper Egypt. Official statistics show that there are 1223 families in the village, each with an average of four members. Descent in Silwa Bahari is patrilineal and the heads of the households belong to one of nine tribes. The families are units that typically include parents, married sons and their spouses, and unmarried children. Each family house, which may have an outer gate opening into a courtyard, has a single main door which all the occupants use to access their own particular quarters. The families are held together by property and the ownership of land. A widowed woman lives with her brother if she transfers her land to him or allows him to cultivate it. On the death of a householder, either his sons divide his property between them, or they agree to co-operate in the joint working of the land.

== Rock art ==
Silwa Bahari is the site of ancient petroglyphs situated in a wadi 1.5 km (0.9 mi) east of the Nile. Some of these illustrate the change in climate experienced by Egypt in the last ten thousand years as they show animals such as elephants, white rhinoceroses, gerenuk and ostriches, a fauna akin to that of present-day East Africa. On the basis of the design of various watercraft depicted, the art has been provisionally dated to the Seventeenth Dynasty of Egypt, about 1550 BC.
