= Nabkha =

Type of sand dune

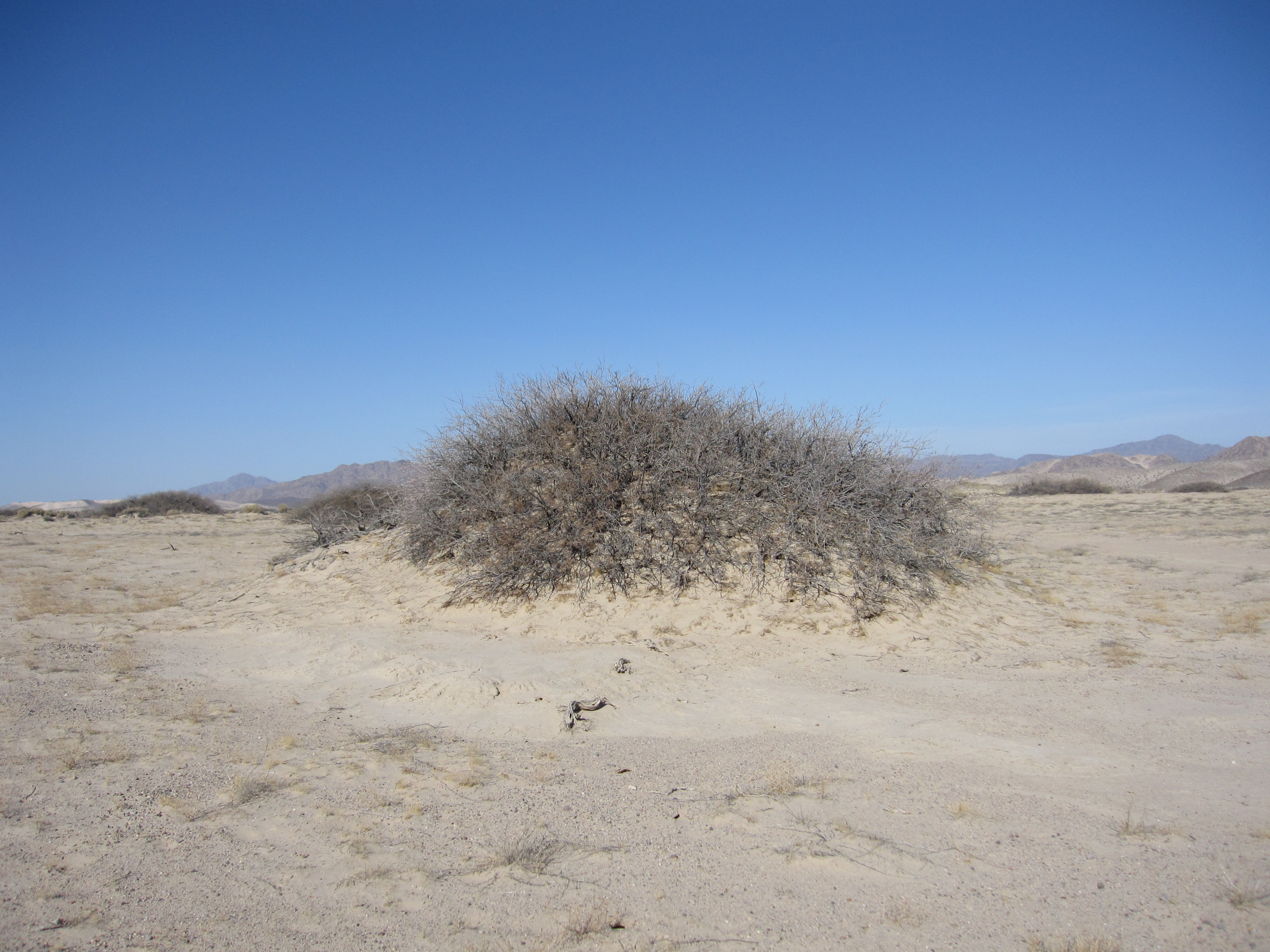
Nabkha around honey mesquite (Prosopis glandulosa) in California

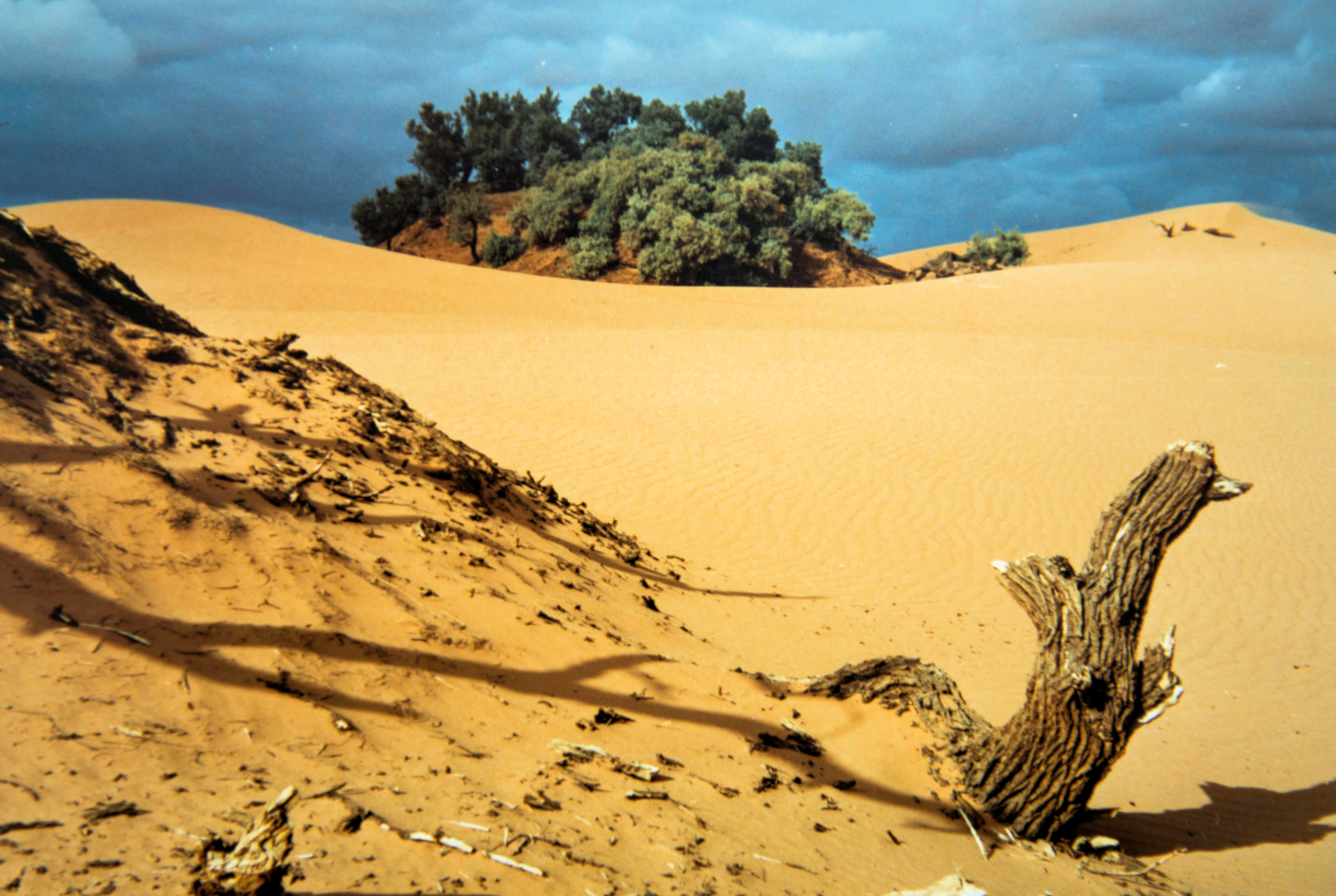
Nabkha dune with tamarisk trees (Tamarix spec.) in the Algerian Sahara

A nabkha, nebkha or nebka (from Arabic: نبكة, romanized: nabka) is a type of sand dune. Other terms used include coppice dune and dune hummock or hummocky dune, but these more accurately refer to similar, but different, sand dune types. Authors have also used the terms phytogenic hillock, bush-mound, shrub-coppice dune, knob dune, dune tumulus, rebdou, nebbe, and takouit.

In simplest terms, a nabkha is a sand dune that forms around vegetation. It is an aeolian landform, a structure built and shaped by the action of wind.

Nabkhas are common and occur in many regions. Well known nabkha fields occur in the Lut Desert of Iran, Arabian Desert of Kuwait, the Hotan River Basin in Xinjiang, China, and New Mexico in the United States and adjacent Chihuahua in Mexico.

== Structure ==
Many species of sand-dwelling plants form nabkhas. In the Chihuahuan Desert they include soaptree (Yucca elata), creosote (Larrea tridentata), and atriplex (Atriplex spp.). In China nabkhas form quite often around Caragana microphylla, as well as Cleistogenes squarrosa, Leymus chinensis, Caragana stenophylla, Stipa grandis, and S. glareosa, plus tamarisks, reeds, and alhagi. In Jal Az-Zor National Park in Kuwait, they occur around Nitraria retusa, Zygophyllum qatarense, Haloxylon salicornicum, and Panicum turgidum. Halophytes such as Tamarix aucheriana, Halocnemum strobilaceum and Salicornia europaea have nabkhas in saline soils, while Cyperus conglomeratus, Rhanterium epapposum, Astragalus spinosus, Lycium shawii, and Citrulus colocynthis are seen in non-saline zones. On the Sinai Peninsula of Egypt they are recorded on Artemisia monosperma, Moltkiopsis ciliata, Calligonum polygonoides, Stipagrostis scoparia, and Retama raetam. In central Asia and surrounding areas they occur on Calotropis, Ziziphus, Salvadora, and Heliotropium species.

A nabkha is variable in size and shape. The typical example is a steep mound with a flat top. The larger nabkhas of the Chihuahuan Desert reach about 4.3 meters tall by 40 meters wide. The largest known were 10 meters tall and a kilometer long; these large dunes have been called mega-nabkhas. Mega-nabkhas in various places have also been called precipitation ridges, bordering dune ridges, and in Dutch, randwallen. Sometimes only the tips of the branches of the plant within protrude from the sand, and sometimes the plant is completely engulfed. Nabkhas may join together and form broad, hilly dune fields, or more often, chains and scattered dune patches. The sand composition is also variable. Silt and clay pellets can be part of the dune. Nabkhas in the Namib Desert are rich in sediment. On the Kuwaiti coastline nabkhas form around Nitraria retusa growing on sabkhas, a form of salt pan. These dunes are composed of quartz, gypsum, and feldspar sands mixed with bits of volcanic rock and calcite grains. Fragments of mollusc shell and oolites can be found. Traces of garnet, zircon, topaz, and tourmaline occur. Dolomite is common. Coastal nabkhas can be eroded by saltwater, and even washed away completely, leaving the plant behind.

The type of plant influences the shape of the nabkha; for example, treasure flower (Gazania rigens) forms tall, conical or elongated dunes, while beach daisy (Arctotheca populifolia) forms shorter, semi-circular dunes. Retama raetam is a salinity-tolerant woody shrub that can extend roots up to 20 meters deep in the soil, persisting through harsh conditions and eventually building nabkhas up to 8 meters wide. A plant generally cannot hold enough sand to start a nabkha until it is at least 10 centimeters tall.

Some sources describe nabkhas as ephemeral features of the landscape, but other research shows that they may last longer than previously thought. Some last over 100 years. Still, a nabkha on an annual plant generally only lasts one season. A nabkha can also be self-limiting if the sand accumulation lifts the plant far enough out of the water table that it dies.

== Ecology ==
Nabkhas are common features in landscapes that are undergoing desertification. In North America, a characteristic sign of desertification is the spread of mesquites (Prosopis spp.) into the habitat. Mesquites rapidly accumulate windblown sand, forming nabkhas. In northern China, nabkhas were present on grasslands before they were converted to agriculture, but this conversion accelerated their development and they are a common feature of abandoned farm fields in the region. They are indicators of soil erosion there.

Nabkhas develop their own ecosystems. They are home to a variety of animals, including many invertebrates such as nematodes and the sand flea Talochestria capensis. The dune tends to have more organic material than the surrounding sand, as windblown plant matter accumulates in it and the roots of the plant penetrate it. In degraded and oil-polluted desert areas in Kuwait, plants with nabkhas act as ecosystem engineers, hosting a sheltered site with layers of relatively rich soil in which other plants can grow. Nabkhas on nitrogen-fixing plants like legumes can have elevated nitrogen levels and other nutrients that other plants can use. The dunes can become islands of plant diversity in otherwise poor habitat.

== Etymology ==
Nabkha is an Arabic word that has been in use for at least 14 centuries. It translates roughly to "small, sandy hillock".
