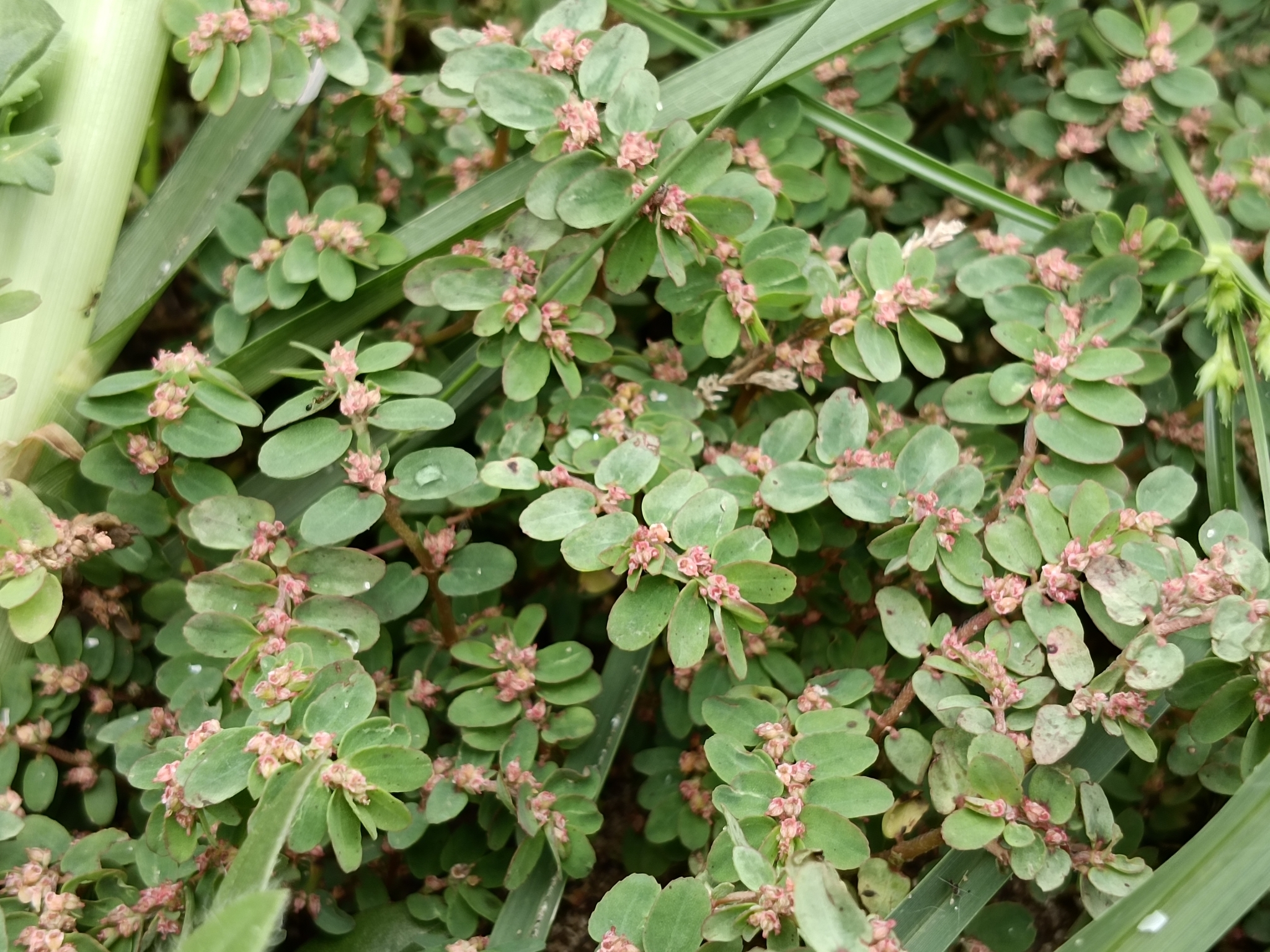

Scientific classification
- Kingdom: Plantae
- Clade: Embryophytes
- Clade: Tracheophytes
- Clade: Spermatophytes
- Clade: Angiosperms
- Clade: Eudicots
- Clade: Rosids
- Order: Malpighiales
- Family: Euphorbiaceae
- Genus: Euphorbia
- Species: E. thymifolia

Binomial name
- Euphorbia thymifolia L.

= Euphorbia thymifolia =

Species of flowering plant in the spurge family

Euphorbia thymifolia, the red caustic-creeper, is a prostrate annual herb of the family Euphorbiaceae. Native to tropical and subtropical America, it grows in seasonally dry tropical biomes and produces milky sap. The plant has velvet-hairy red stems up to 25 cm (9.8 in) long, with small ovate leaves and minute cyathia flowers in the leaf axils. Widely used as a traditional medicine in Africa and Asia, it is also harvested as food and traded in local markets.
