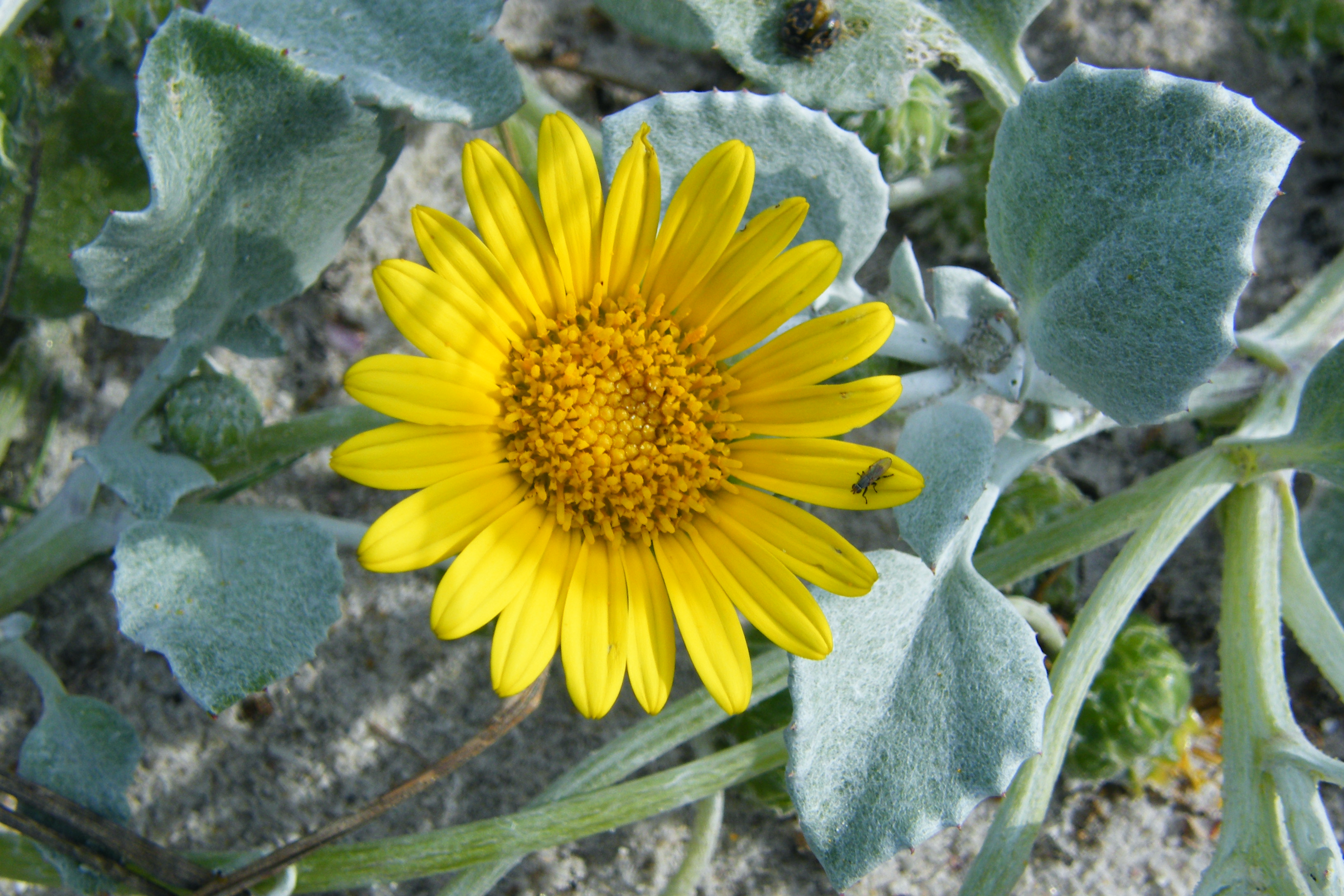

Scientific classification
- Kingdom: Plantae
- Clade: Tracheophytes
- Clade: Angiosperms
- Clade: Eudicots
- Clade: Asterids
- Order: Asterales
- Family: Asteraceae
- Genus: Arctotheca
- Species: A. populifolia

Binomial name
- Arctotheca populifolia (P.J.Bergius) Norl.

Synonyms
- Synonymy: Anemonospermos verbascifolia Kuntze; Arctotheca nivea K.Lewin; Arctotis nivea (G.Nicholson) K.Lewin; Arctotis populifolia P.J.Bergius; Arctotis verbascifolia Harv.; Cryptostemma niveum G.Nicholson; Microstephium niveum (L.f.) Less.; Microstephium populifolium (P.J.Bergius) Druce; Osteospermum niveum L.f.

= Arctotheca populifolia =

Species of plant

Arctotheca populifolia is a species of flowering plant in the family Asteraceae known by the common names beach daisy, Cape beach daisy, South African beach daisy, coast capeweed, dune arctotheca, beach pumpkin, sea pumpkin, dune cabbage, and in South Africa, seepampoen, tonteldoek, and strandgousblom. This species is native to coastal areas of the Cape Provinces and KwaZulu-Natal in South Africa, and of Mozambique. It was introduced to Australia and is now a common weed of coastal areas in New South Wales, South Australia, Tasmania, Victoria, and Western Australia.

== Description ==
This plant is a perennial herb with thick, ribbed, decumbent stems growing in clumps up to 30 centimeters tall. The herbage is woolly, gray, and fleshy. The white-haired leaves have oval blades up to 6 centimeters long by 5 wide, with smooth or toothed edges. The inflorescence is borne on a woolly, erect peduncle up to 11 centimeters tall. The flower head is about 2 centimeters wide with yellow ray florets 5 to 7 millimeters long and yellow disc florets in the center. The fruit is a white-woolly cypsela about half a centimeter long.

== Ecology ==
This plant is a pioneer species of sandy coastal habitat types, such as dunes. It is a main factor in the formation of dune hummocks, a dune type formed in its native South Africa when wind deposits sand around it and other newly established beach plants. One small form of dune hummock is a nabkha. This plant and its associate Gazania rigens form nabkhas that are inhabited by a variety of small animals such as nematodes and the sand flea Talorchestia capensis.

The ability of the plant to colonize bare sand has helped it take hold on the Australian coastline. It was planted for beach stabilization in Western Australia until it became apparent that it was invasive. Native Spinifex grasses are now used for this purpose. The beach daisy is now a coastal weed of much of temperate Australia. It can also grow on basaltic soils, allowing it to move inland from beaches to grasslands.

The seeds of the plant are wind-dispersed, but because they remain viable in fresh and salt water, they are also commonly dispersed on the water. As a coastal species, they are carried on ocean currents. The seeds can also be transported in soil and plant waste.

As an invasive species, it competes with native plants such as hairy spinifex (Spinifex sericeus). It binds sand more efficiently, holding more of it and thus changing the topography of the dune systems. This process can interrupt the flow of seawater into and out of coastal lakes. Even seedlings one centimeter tall can accumulate sand, building tiny dunes of their own. Many shorebirds nest on bare sand beaches because they can more easily see predators, so the buildup of vegetation and hilly dunes interferes with their nesting.

The flowers are pollinated by bees and flies. The plant is host to the arbuscular mycorrhizal fungus Septoglomus fuscum. The seeds of the plant are a favored food item of the African hairy-footed gerbil (Gerbillurus paeba), which also eats T. capensis, the sand flea that lives in the dunes around the plant.
