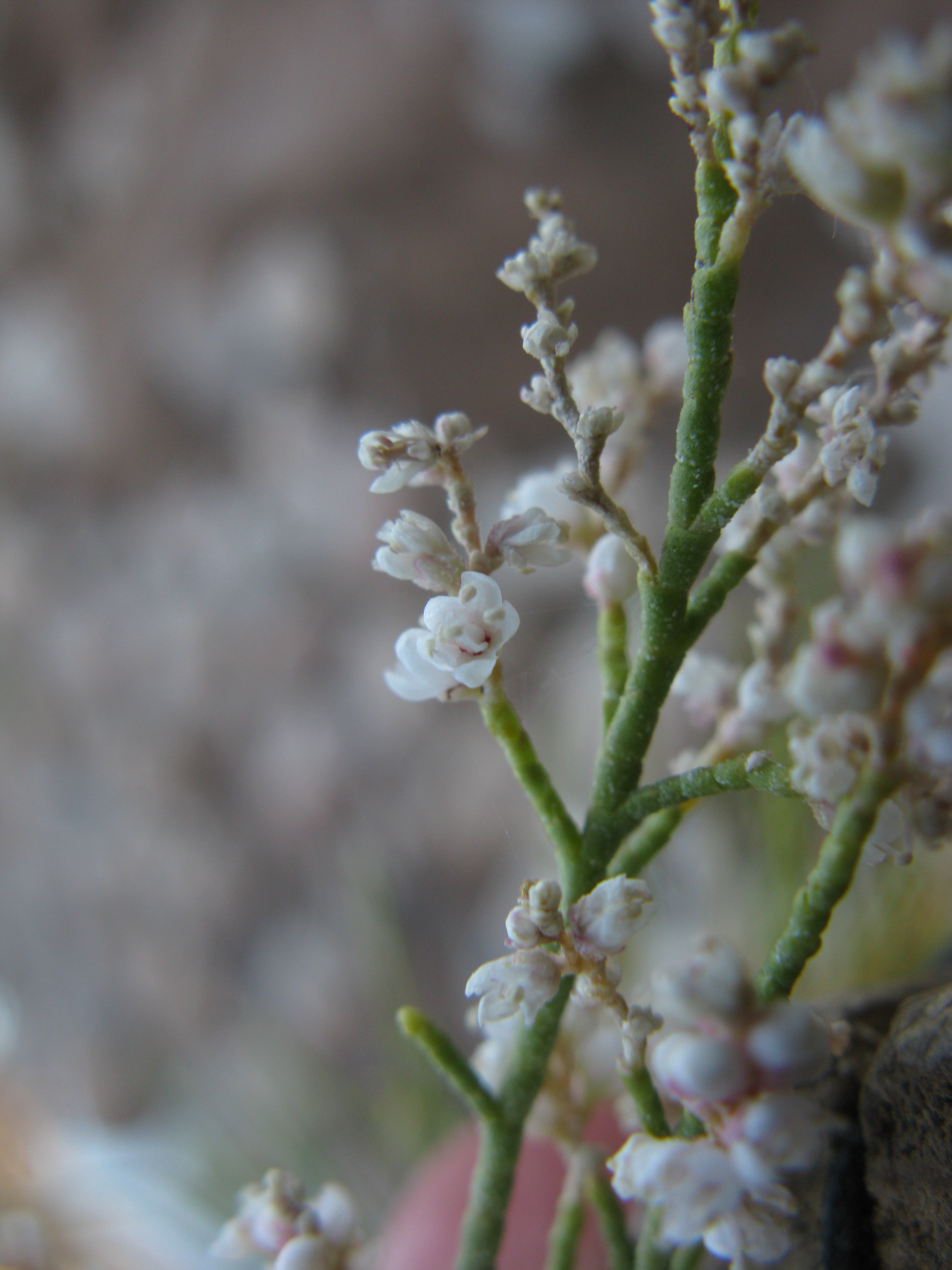

Scientific classification
- Kingdom: Plantae
- Clade: Tracheophytes
- Clade: Angiosperms
- Clade: Eudicots
- Order: Caryophyllales
- Family: Tamaricaceae
- Genus: Tamarix
- Species: T. usneoides

Binomial name
- Tamarix usneoides E.Mey. ex Bunge (1852)

Synonyms
- Tamarix angolensis Nied. ex Engl. (1921); Tamarix angolensis Nied. (1925); Tamarix austroafricana Schinz (1894)

= Tamarix usneoides =

Species of shrub

Tamarix usneoides, locally known as wild tamarisk, is a twiggy shrub or small evergreen tree that grows in saline habitats, semi-deserts and karroid areas in southern Africa, ranging from Angola through Namibia to the Cape Provinces of South Africa. It has a short trunk, thin branches usually growing from ground level, tiny scale-like leaves and spikes of creamy-white flowers.

== Description ==
Tamarix usneoides is a shrub or small tree, up to 6 m (20 ft) tall, with slender branches and an upright form. It usually branches from the base and often grows in clumps. The trunk is greyish-brown and rough, with longitudinal fissures. The roots are designed to harvest water from a large area; the taproot may descend to 30 m (100 ft), and the adventitious roots spread out for 50 m (160 ft) on either side. The greyish-green leaves are minute and scale-like, overlapping each other and clasping the stem. The inflorescences can be loose or dense sprays of small flowers in the leaf axils or forming racemes at the tips of the shoots. Each individual flower is small and creamy-white, with a persistent corolla. The fruits are capsules containing many tiny seeds.

== Distribution and habitat ==
Tamarix usneoides is native to Angola, Namibia and the southwestern part of South Africa, where it occurs in the provinces of Northern Cape, Western Cape and Eastern Cape. It inhabits semi-desert and karoo habitats, riverbanks of dry or temporary rivers, salty alluvial flatlands, areas with subterranean brackish water, dune slacks and rocky deserts, at altitudes of up to 1,370 m (4,500 ft). In saline locations it often grows in association with the shrub Suaeda fruticosa and the grass Odyssea paucinervis. In the Namib Desert it occurs beside ephemeral watercourses where it grows with Faidherbia albida and species of Ficus.
