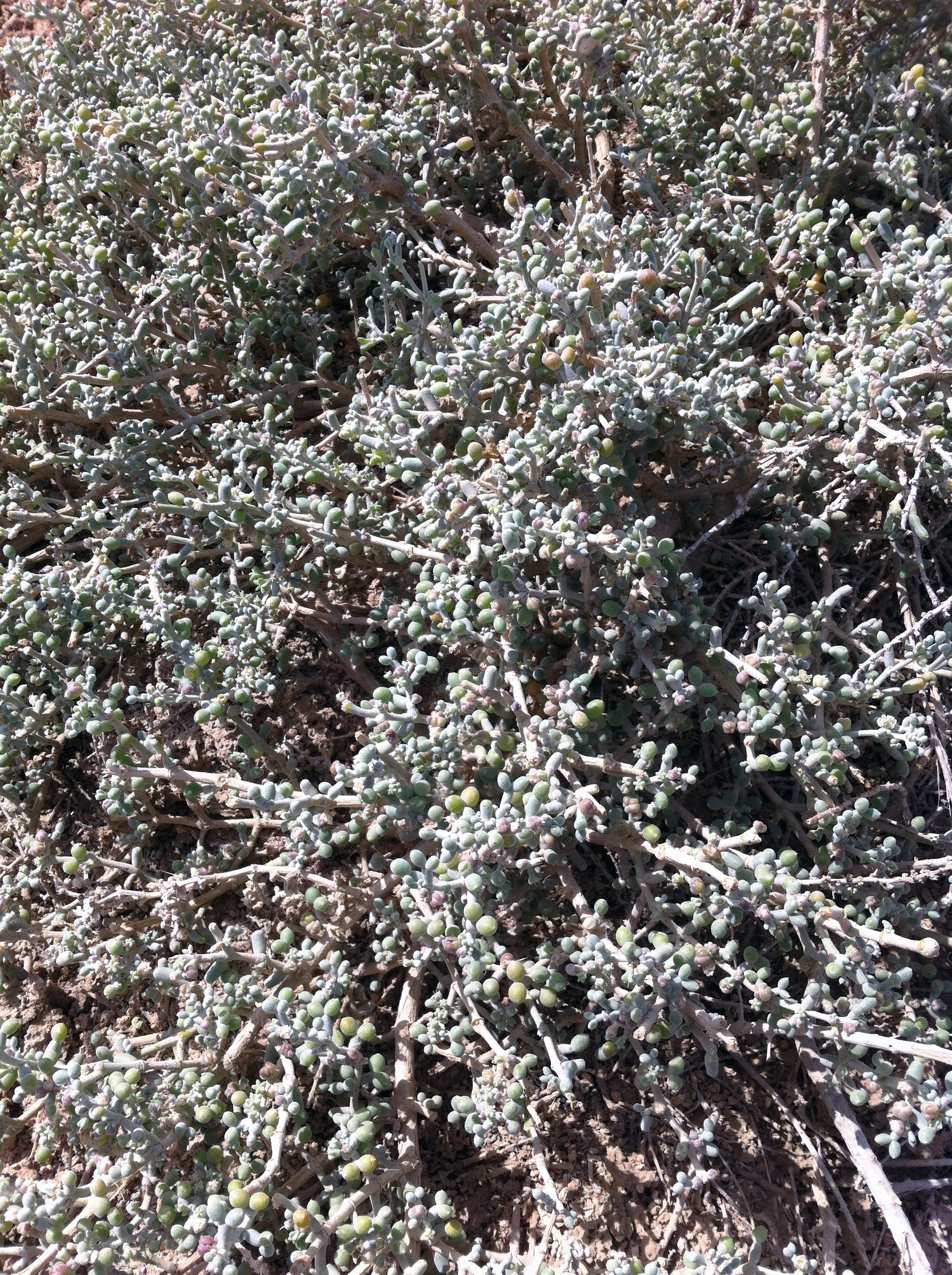
- Growing in Tunisia

Scientific classification
- Kingdom: Plantae
- Clade: Tracheophytes
- Clade: Angiosperms
- Clade: Eudicots
- Clade: Rosids
- Order: Zygophyllales
- Family: Zygophyllaceae
- Genus: Zygophyllum
- Species: Z. album

Binomial name
- Zygophyllum album L.f.

Synonyms
- Tetraena alba (L.f.) Beier & Thulin; Zygophyllum amblyocarpum Baker; Zygophyllum proliferum Forssk.

= Zygophyllum album =

Species of flowering plant

Zygophyllum album (synonym Tetraena alba) is a species of plant in the family Zygophyllaceae which is found in arid regions of Africa and the Arabian Peninsula. It is a salt tolerant plant and dominates many of the plant communities in which it grows.

== Description ==
Zygophyllum album is a low, much-branched shrub. The leaves have paired obovoid, fleshy leaflets which are whitish with mealy pubescence. The small flowers are solitary and grow in the axils of the leaves; they have white, clawed petals. The fruit is a five-lobed, pear-shaped capsule containing elliptical seeds with wart-like projections.

== Distribution ==
This species is found in Spain, Crete, Northern and Northeast Africa, Mauritania, Western Asia (including southern Cyprus, the Eastern Aegean Islands and the Sinai Peninsula) and the Arabian Peninsula.

== Ecology ==
Zygophyllum album is a salt-tolerant plant; it does not have glands to secrete the excess salt it takes up, instead it concentrates the salt in its leaves and then sheds them, also shedding its petioles when necessary. It is found in a number of different habitats; one of these is "phytogenic hillocks", hummocky landforms typical in areas with blown sands; another is in saline depressions, sometimes as pure stands, and other times as the dominant plant in its community. Other plants in the salt-tolerant communities in which it lives include Halocnemum strobilaceum, Nitraria retusa and Limonium axillare. At the Moghra Oasis in the Qattara Depression there is a brackish lake and a Phragmites swamp, and T. alba grows at the perimeter, where the desert plains start. In the innermost part of this zone it forms hummocks and grows with Tamarix nilotica, Alhagi maurorum and Nitraria retusa. In the outermost part the plants are scant, do not form mounds and are progressively smaller.
