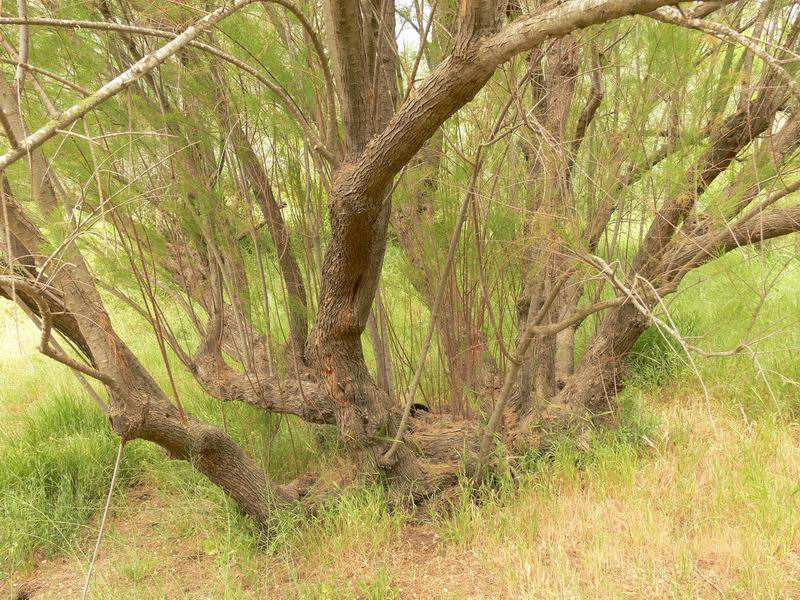

Conservation status
- Least Concern (IUCN 3.1)

Scientific classification
- Kingdom: Plantae
- Clade: Embryophytes
- Clade: Tracheophytes
- Clade: Spermatophytes
- Clade: Angiosperms
- Clade: Eudicots
- Order: Caryophyllales
- Family: Tamaricaceae
- Genus: Tamarix
- Species: T. nilotica

Binomial name
- Tamarix nilotica (Ehrenb.) Bunge

= Tamarix nilotica =

Species of plant

Tamarix nilotica, the Nile tamarisk is a species of shrub or small tree in the tamarisk family. It is native to arid parts of Greece, the Middle East, and North and East Africa, particularly areas with high salinity. It forms part of the dune stabilisation process.

== Description ==
Tamarix nilotica is a much-branched shrub or small tree up to 10 m (33 ft) high. The twigs are slender and are half-clasped by the tiny, narrow, lanceolate leaves, up to 3 mm (0.1 in) long. The inflorescence is a raceme 5 to 10 cm (2 to 4 in) long, with many small white or pink flowers, each with a short pedicel, five sepals, five petals and five stamens.

== Distribution and habitat ==
Tamarix nilotica has a wide distribution from Greece through the Arabian Peninsula into the north and north-east of Africa. It is native to Southeastern Europe (Greece, Crete), Western Asia (the East Aegean Islands, the Palestine region, Sinai), the Arabian Peninsula (the Gulf States, Oman, Saudi Arabia, Yemen), Northern Africa (Egypt, Libya), Northeast Tropical Africa (Chad, Djibouti, Eritrea, Ethiopia, Somalia, Sudan), and East Tropical Africa (Kenya, Tanzania). In the Nile Valley in Egypt, this tree grows beside the river and the irrigation channels. It can form dense thickets in suitable locations. It is also found as part of a salt-tolerant community in saline depressions in the Western Desert, and on coastal dunes where its deep roots are able to extract saline water from the subsoil; it has salt-excreting glands to rid itself of the excess salts that would otherwise accumulate.

== Ecology ==
At the Moghra oasis, in the Qattara Depression, there is a brackish lake and a Phragmites swamp, and T. nilotica dominates a zone on the edge of the oasis where the vegetation ceases and the surrounding arid plains start. Here it grows in association with Alhagi maurorum, Nitraria retusa Zygophyllum album and Cressa cretica.

== Uses ==
Tamarix nilotica can help stabilise sand and may form nabkhas as part of the dune forming process. Wind blown sand comes to rest at the foot of the shrub and accumulates, gradually creating a hummock; the shrub's extensive root system continues to extract moisture from the underlying saline substrate and grows at a faster rate than the mound rises.

In Egypt, T. nilotica has been used in traditional medicine as an antiseptic, an antipyretic, for alleviating headaches and reducing inflammation. It also has a reputation as an aphrodisiac.
