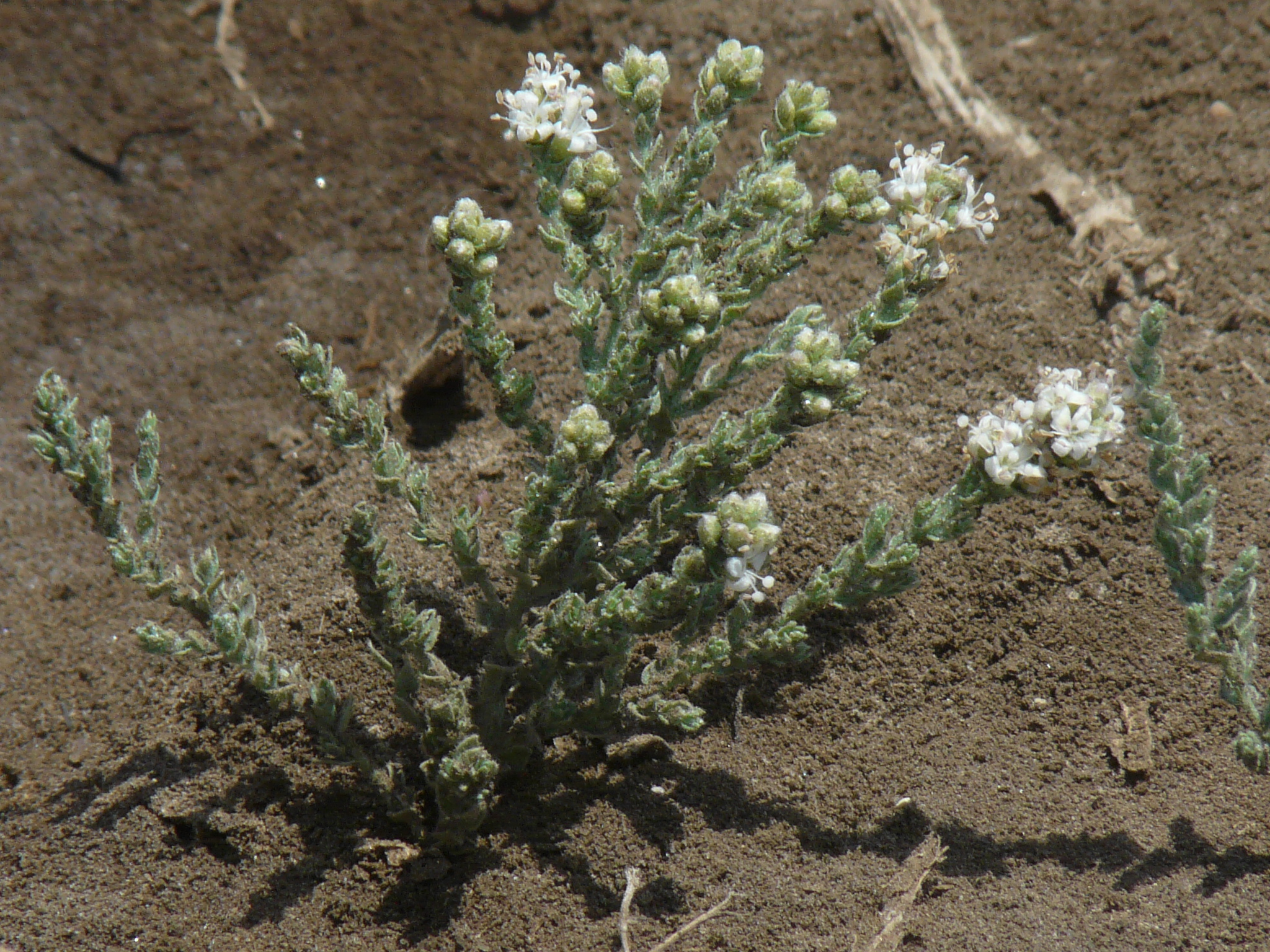

Conservation status
- Least Concern (IUCN 3.1)

Scientific classification
- Kingdom: Plantae
- Clade: Tracheophytes
- Clade: Angiosperms
- Clade: Eudicots
- Clade: Asterids
- Order: Solanales
- Family: Convolvulaceae
- Genus: Cressa
- Species: C. cretica

Binomial name
- Cressa cretica L.

= Cressa cretica =

Species of flowering plant

Cressa cretica is a species of flowering plant in the morning glory family. It is found in northern and central Africa, southern Europe and western Asia, as well as parts of southeastern Asia and Australia. It has long been used in traditional medicine and research has demonstrated that it has some therapeutic effects.

== Description ==
Cressa cretica is a densely branching subshrub growing to a height of about 38 cm (15 in). The leaves are small, stubby, obtuse and clad in silky hairs. The flowers grow in groups in the axils of the upper leaves and are white; the back of the reflexed corolla lobes are hairy near the tip. The fruits are ovoid, pointed capsules, usually containing a single seed.

== Etymology ==
Cressa: Greek, based on kris or kriti, "from Crete", a Cretan woman.

== Distribution and habitat ==
Cressa cretica is known from the Mediterranean part of Europe, northern and central Africa, the Arabian Peninsula, the Middle East and western Asia as far east as India and Sri Lanka. It also occurs in parts of southeastern Asia and in a number of states in Australia, but it is unclear as to whether it is native to these places. It is a halophyte and grows in salty parts of oases, in depressions in sandy areas that become wet seasonally, in salt marshes and beside temporary pools.

== Uses ==
This plant is much used in traditional medicine; it is reputed to be an anthelmintic, an expectorant, an aid to digestion, an aphrodisiac and to have tonic properties among other uses. Research shows that the plant contains a number of chemical constituents and that it has some potential as an antibacterial, an antifungal and an antitussive agent. In combination with Tridax procumbens and Euphorbia thymifolia, it has been found to be effective as an anticancer treatment. It has also been shown to improve testicular function in rats.
