= Juncus rigidus =

Sea rush

Conservation status
- Least Concern (IUCN 3.1)

Scientific classification
- Kingdom: Plantae
- Clade: Tracheophytes
- Clade: Angiosperms
- Clade: Monocots
- Clade: Commelinids
- Order: Poales
- Family: Juncaceae
- Genus: Juncus
- Species: J. rigidus

Binomial name
- Juncus rigidus Desf.

Species of grass

Juncus rigidus is a species of rush known by the common name sea rush. It is native to much of Africa and parts of western Asia. It is found inland and by the sea in sandy saline habitats.

== Distribution and habitat ==
Juncus rigidus is native to much of Africa, Mediterranean Europe, the Arabian Peninsula and western Asia, as far east as Pakistan. It grows in sandy, saline areas on the coast and inland, in deserts and in steppes. Its typical habitat is on the fringes of salt marshes, around pools, in seasonally wet depressions and near wells.

== Ecology ==
In Egypt, Juncus rigidus grows in association with other salt-tolerant plants such as Halocnemum strobilaceum, golden samphire (Limbarda crithmoides), Arthrocnemum macrostachyum, shrubby seablight (Suaeda vera) and sea purslane (Halimione portulacoides).

== Uses ==
In Ancient Egypt, Juncus rigidus was used to make pens for writing on papyrus. The rush has also been used for weaving mats and the fibre can be used in paper manufacture. The seeds are high in amino acids, proteins, oils and carbohydrates and might be of use in the chemical industry. It has been suggested that this plant, along with its close relative the sharp-pointed rush (Juncus acutus), might be grown on saline land as an alternative crop with agro-industrial potential. It can be used for the cellulose production from field grown plants [Singh et al 2019] and in vitro culture [vyas et al 2021].
