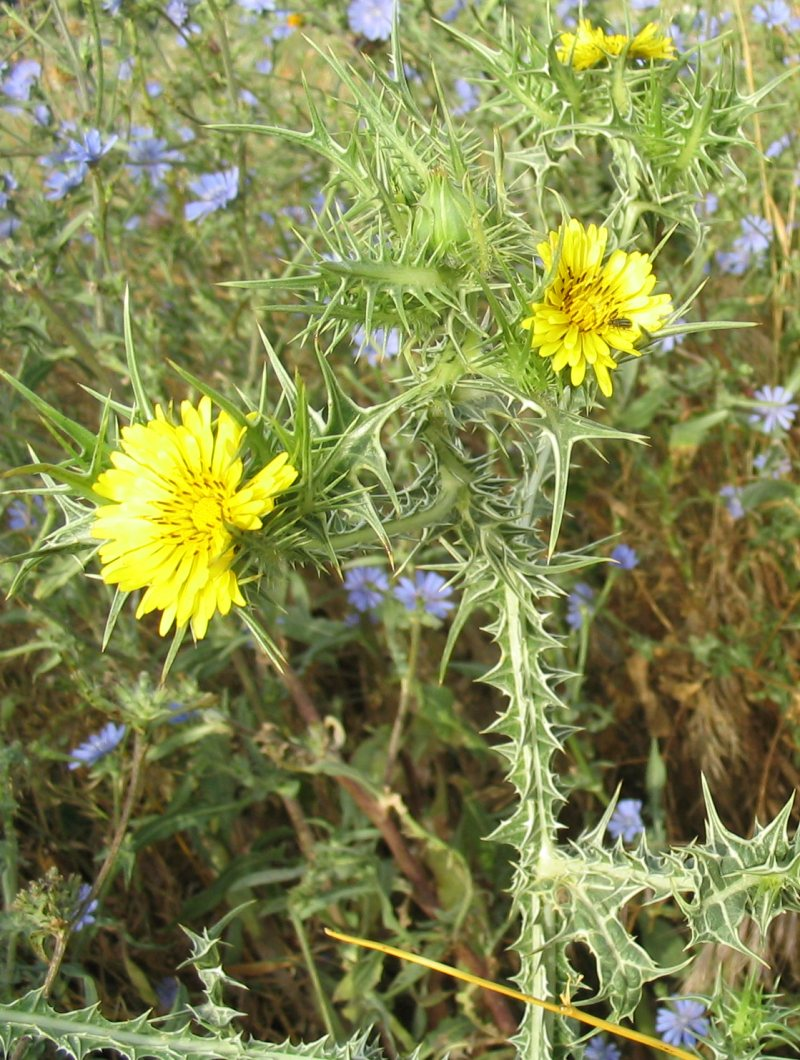

Scientific classification
- Kingdom: Plantae
- Clade: Tracheophytes
- Clade: Angiosperms
- Clade: Eudicots
- Clade: Asterids
- Order: Asterales
- Family: Asteraceae
- Genus: Scolymus
- Species: S. maculatus

Binomial name
- Scolymus maculatus L.

= Scolymus maculatus =

Species of flowering plant

Scolymus maculatus is a spiny annual plant in the family Asteraceae. It is known as scolyme taché in French, cardogna macchiata in Italian, ⵉⵙⵔⵉ in Tamazight cardo borriquero in Spanish, and escólimo-malhado in Portuguese, חוח עקוד in Hebrew and سنارية حولية in Arabic. In English it is called spotted golden thistle or spotted oyster thistle.

The plant has pinnately incised prickly leaves and prickly wings along the stems, both with a white marginal vein. The yellow flower heads stand solitary or with a few together at the tip to the stems, and subtended by more than five leaflike bracts. It is native to the Mediterranean region in southern Europe, southwest Asia, and northern Africa, and also the Canary Islands.

== Description ==
Scolymus maculatus is a spiny herbaceous annual, biennial or perennial up to 1.5 metres (5 ft) high. The stems carry uninterrupted spiny wings along their lengths. The wavy leaves are approximately ovate in shape, mostly 9–14 centimetres (3 1/2–5 1/2 in) long, with prominent white veins which are pinnately divided, alternately set along the stems, and have a dentate margin tipped with spines and a white vein all around their outline. The plant contains a milky latex and has twenty chromosomes (2n=20).

The roundish flower heads are seated at the end of the stem. Each is subtended by an involucre, consisting of more than five spine-tipped bracts between 11 and 18 millimetres (3/8 and 3/4 in) long, arranged in several rows. The inner bracts are leaflike, the outer ones short and thin with a white margin. The common floral base (or receptacle) is 7–11 mm (1/4–3/8 in) in diameter, conical in shape, and set with ovate papery bracts called chaff or paleae. Implanted are dorsally compressed cypselas, each enclosed by a palea, the outer rows higher than the inner ones. There are no pappus bristles on top of the cypselas. The yellow, strap-like corolla is 17–24 mm (5/8–1 in) long, ends in five teeth, and carries some black hairs on the tube.

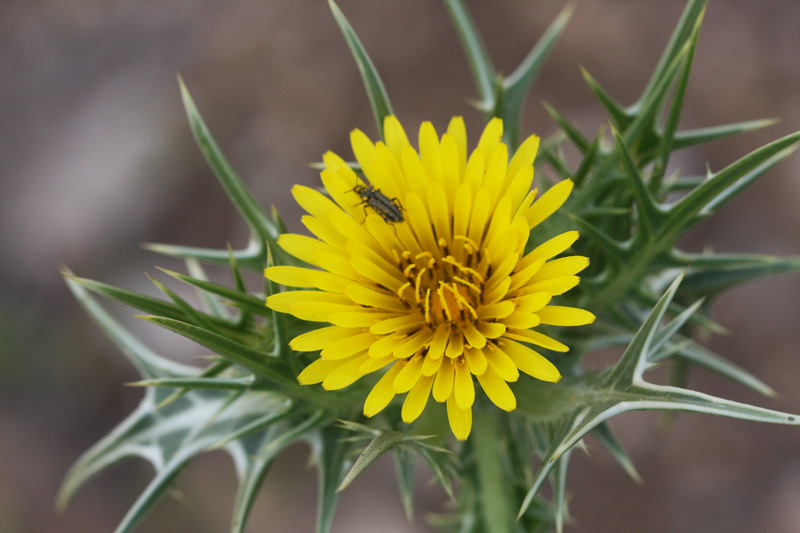
Detail of a flower head

=== Identification ===
Like in all Asteraceae, the pentameric flowers have anthers that are fused together, forming a tube through which the style grows. The style picks up the pollen on hairs along its length and splits into two style branches at its tip. These parts sit on an inferior ovary that grows into an indehiscent fruit in which only one seed develops (a so-called cypsela). All florets are set on a common base (the receptacle), and are surrounded by an involucre of several rows of bracts.

Golden thistles are assigned to the Cichorieae tribe, which shares anastomosing latex canals in both root, stem and leaves, and has flower heads only consisting of one type of floret. In Scolymus, these are ligulate florets, common to the group except for Warionia and Gundelia, which only have disk florets. A unique characteristic distinguishing Scolymus within its tribe are the dorsally compressed cypsellas, which are surrounded by scales (or paleae).

Scolymus maculatus is an annual of up to 1.5 m (5 ft) high. It has more than five pinnately divided bracts subtending each flower head. The yellow florets carry some black hairs. The cypselas do not have pappus at their top (but are encased by the paleae). The spined wings along the stems are uninterrupted. Leaves have a whitish vein along their margin.

=== Similar species ===
Scolymus grandiflorus is an annual or biennial of up to 0.75 m (2 1/2 ft) high. It has one, two or three spiny dentate bracts subtending each flower head. The yellow to orange florets do not have black hairs. The cypselas are topped by three to seven bristles of smooth pappus hairs (and are encased by the paleae). The spined wings along the stems are uninterrupted.

Scolymus hispanicus is an annual, biennial or perennial of up to 1.75 m (5 1/2 ft) high. It has one, two or three spiny dentate bracts subtending each flower head. The yellow, orange or white florets lack black hairs. The cypselas are topped by two to five bristles of scabrous pappus hairs (and are encased by the paleae). The spined wings along the stems are interrupted.

== Distribution and habitat ==
The species naturally occurs on the Canary Islands, Madeira and along the Mediterranean, notably in Portugal, Spain (including on the Baleares), France (the coast of the Languedoc-Roussillon region, and the departements Vaucluse, Lot, Bas-Rhin and Somme), Italy (Sicily, Sardinia, Tuscany, Lazio, Campania, Basilicata, Calabria Apulia, Molise and Abruzzo), Malta, Greece, Cyprus, Turkey, Lebanon, Syria, Iraq, Israel, Egypt, Tunesia, Algeria and Morocco.

Scolymus maculatus is nitrophilous plant, that prefers deep, rich, but disturbed clayey soils in sunny or lightly shaded positions, such as fallowed or abandoned fields, ditches and roadsides. It generally only occurs below 700 m (2,300 ft) altitude and along the coast, where there are less than 15 frost days. In Israel it occurs in woodlands and shrublands, steppes, and desert, but also in the montane vegetation on Mount Hermon. Flowers are present between May and August. The hermaphrodite flowers are pollinated by insects.
