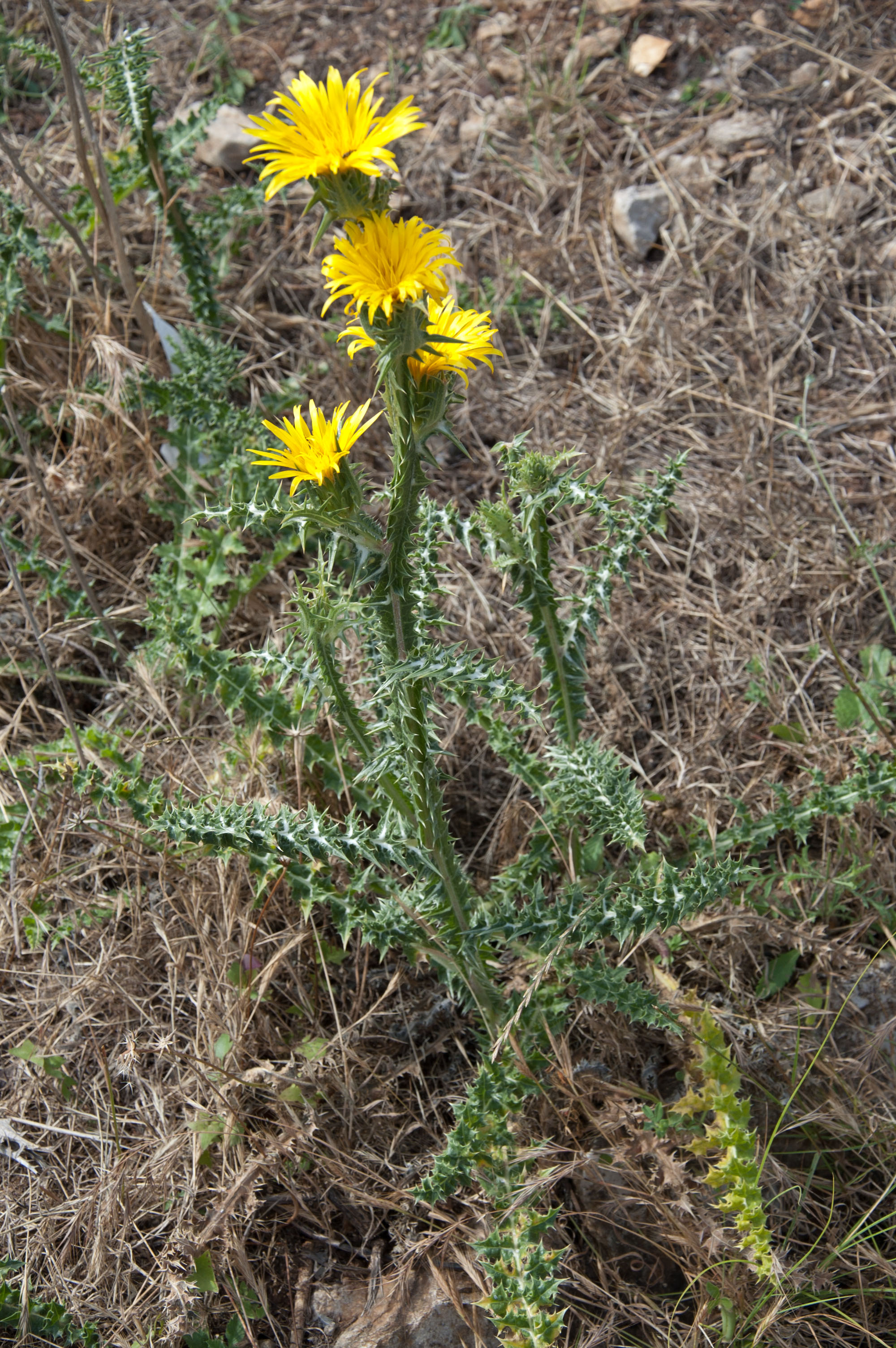

Scientific classification
- Kingdom: Plantae
- Clade: Tracheophytes
- Clade: Angiosperms
- Clade: Eudicots
- Clade: Asterids
- Order: Asterales
- Family: Asteraceae
- Genus: Scolymus
- Species: S. grandiflorus

Binomial name
- Scolymus grandiflorus Desf.

Synonyms
- Myscolus megacephalus; Scolymus hispanicus subsp. grandiflorus

= Scolymus grandiflorus =

Species of flowering plant

Scolymus grandiflorus is a spiny annual or biennial plant in the family Asteraceae, native to the Mediterranean region. With up to 75 cm high stems, it is the smallest of the species of Scolymus. Its stems are lined with uninterrupted spiny wings. It also has the largest flowerheads in the genus, of approximately 5 cm wide. It has yellow, sometimes yolk-yellow ligulate florets. Its vernacular name in Maltese is xewk isfar kbir, meaning "large yellow fin", cardogna maggiore in Italian, scoddi on Sicily, and scolyme à grandes fleurs in French.

== Description ==
Scolymus grandiflorus is a spiny herbaceous annual or biennial of up to ¾ m high, that contains a milky latex. It has twenty chromosomes (2n=20).

=== Root, stem and leaves ===
The stems carry uninterrupted spiny wings along their lengths. The rosette leaves are usually 10-16, exceptionally up to 24 cm long and ovate to oblong in shape, pinnately incised, with a wavy, spiny and dentate margin. The leaves on the stem are alternately set and are smaller but comparable to the rosette leaves.

=== Inflorescence, flowers and fruits ===
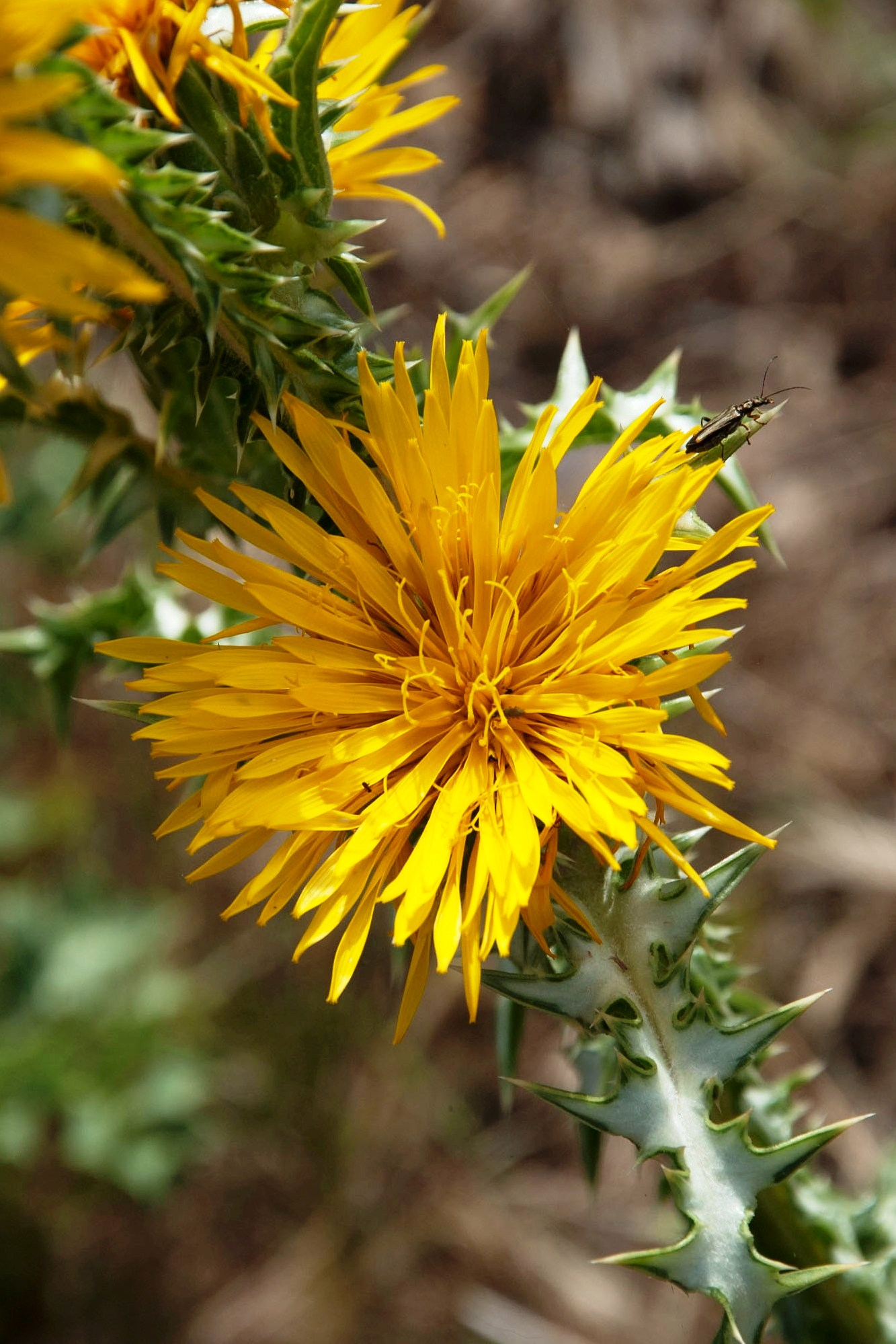
detail of a flowerhead

The flowerheads are seated at the end of the stem or in the limbs of the higher leaves, and are arranged in a spike, which are subtended by two or three leaflike bracts. Each flowerhead is circled by an involucre that consists of many spine-tipped bracts of usually between 9 and 15 mm long, in several rows, the outer papery and shorter than the inner ones, which are leaflike in consistency and have a white papery margin. These surround the common floral base (or receptacle), which is mostly 13–18 mm in diameter conical in shape and is set with ovate papery bracts called chaff or paleae. Implanted are dorsally compressed cypselas, each enclosed by a palea, the outer rows higher than the inner ones. There are three to seven pappus bristles on top of the cypselas in the centre, three to five with bordering the involucre. The yellow to yolk-yellow, strap-like corolla is usually 25–37 mm long, ends in five teeth, and does not carry black hair. Flowers are present from May to July.

=== Characters common to all Asteraceae ===
Like in all Asteraceae, the pentameric flowers have anthers that are fused together forming a tube through which the style grows. The style picks up the pollen on hairs along its length and splits into two style branches at its tip. These parts sit on an inferior ovary that grows into an indehiscent fruit in which only one seed develops (a so-called cypsela). All florets are set on a common base (the receptacle), and are surrounded by several rows of bracts, that form an involucre.

=== Characters common to Cichorieae ===
Golden thistles are assigned to the Cichorieae tribe that shares anastomosing latex canals in both root, stem and leaves, and has flower heads only consisting of one type of floret. In Scolymus these are ligulate florets, common to the group except for Warionia and Gundelia, which only have disk florets. A unique character setting Scolymus apart from the other Cichorieae are the dorsally compressed cypsellas which are surrounded by scales (or paleae).

=== Differences with other Scolymus species ===
S. grandiflorus is an annual or biennial of up to ¾ m high with one, two or three leaflike bracts subtending each cluster of flowerheads and these are spiny dentate. The yellow to orange florets do not have black hairs. The cypselas are topped by three to seven bristles of smooth pappus hairs (and are encased by the paleae). The spined wings along the stems are uninterrupted.

S. maculatus is an annual of up to 1½ m high, there are more than five leaflike bracts subtending each cluster of flowerhead, and these bracts are pinnately divided. The yellow florets carry some black hairs. The cypselas do not have pappus at their top (but are encased by the paleae). The spined wings along the stems are uninterrupted. Leaves have a whitish vein along their margin.

S. hispanicus is an annual, biennial or perennial of up to 1¾ m high and it also has one, two or three spiny dentate leaflike bracts subtending each cluster of flowerheads and the yellow, orange or white florets also lack black hairs. The cypselas however are topped by two to five bristles of scabrous pappus hairs (and are encased by the paleae). In this species the spined wings along the stems are interrupted.

This species can at first sight be confused with Carthamus species, such as C. lanatus, which is a true thistle with yellow disk florets, and although prickles are present on the stems, spiny wings are absent.

== Taxonomy ==
In 1601, Carolus Clusius described this species for the first time, naming it Scolymus Dioscor. Castos Theophrasti. This name originates from before the start of the Linnean nomenclature and is therefore invalid. The correct name was given by René Louiche Desfontaines in 1799. In 1825 Henri Cassini described Myscolus megacephalus, but this is regarded a synonym.

== Distribution ==
The species is most widely present in Morocco, Algeria, Tunisia, Malta, Libya, and on Sicily. It further occurs in Lebanon, Turkey, Italy (Sicily, Sardinia, Lombardia, Tuscany, Basilicata, Calabria, Puglia and Abruzzo), and in France (the coast of the Languedoc-Roussillon region, the departement Bouches-du-Rhône and on southern Corsica), but has a patchy distribution in these parts. Remarkable is its absence from the east of Spain and the Balears and from the south of the Balkans.

== Ecology ==
S. grandiflorus has a preference for coastal areas, and can mostly be found on sandy soils. It grows on wastelands, often in the company of Carduus spp., Carthamus spp. and Onopordum spp.
