= Wario (disambiguation) =

Wario is a Nintendo video game character from the Mario game franchise, and the star of the Wario series, which includes the Wario Land and WarioWare series.

Wario may also refer to:

- Hassan Wario (born 1970), Kenyan politician
- Golich Juma Wario, Kenyan politician
- Ali Wario, a Kenyan politician; a Member of Parliament representing Bura Constituency
- Wario Hashida (Japanese: 橋田割男, romanized: Hashida Wario), a fictional character from Cute High Earth Defense Club Love!

== Other uses ==
- "Wario" (TV segment), a 2021 comedic TV skit from Saturday Night Live; see List of unofficial Mario media

== See also ==
- List of Wario video games, the Wario-subseries of Mario-franchise videogames from Nintendo
- Waria (disambiguation)
- WARY
- Wari (disambiguation)
  - Wali (disambiguation)
- Ware (disambiguation)
- War (disambiguation)
- Warionia
