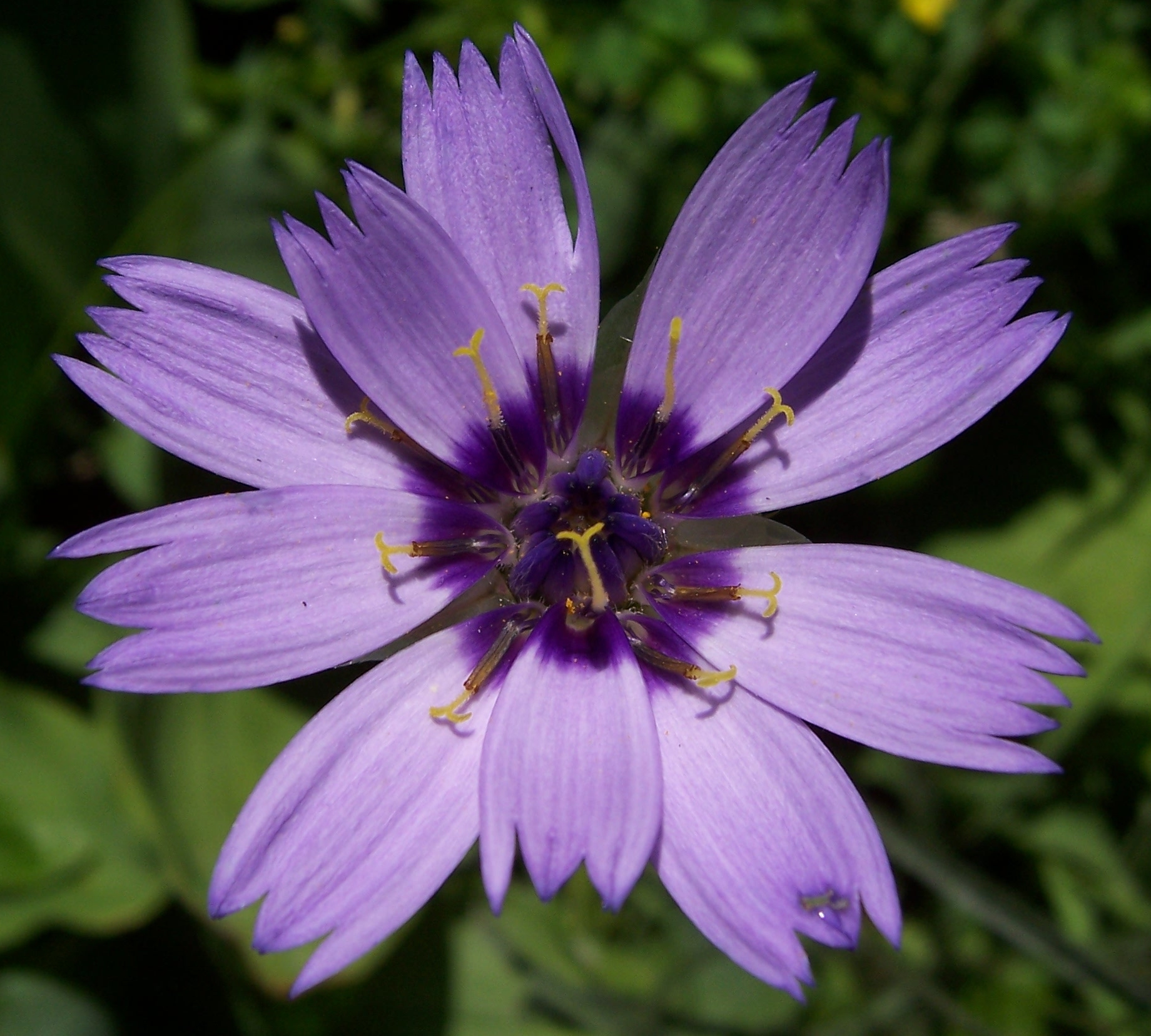

Scientific classification
- Kingdom: Plantae
- Clade: Tracheophytes
- Clade: Angiosperms
- Clade: Eudicots
- Clade: Asterids
- Order: Asterales
- Family: Asteraceae
- Genus: Catananche
- Species: C. caerulea

Binomial name
- Catananche caerulea L.

Synonyms
- Cupidonia caerulea; Catananche caerulea var. ochroleuca; C. caerulea var. propinqua, C. propinqua; C. caerulea var. tenuis; C. caerulea var. tlemcenensis

= Catananche caerulea =

Species of flowering plant

Catananche caerulea, or Cupid's dart, is a greyish green perennial herbaceous plant with a basal leaf rosette and conspicuous blue-purple or sometimes white flowerheads, belonging to the daisy family. It is a popular garden plant and is often used in dried flower arrangements.

It is native to the Mediterranean region. The flower was supposedly used by the ancient Greeks as a key ingredient in a love potion, hence the common name "Cupid's dart".

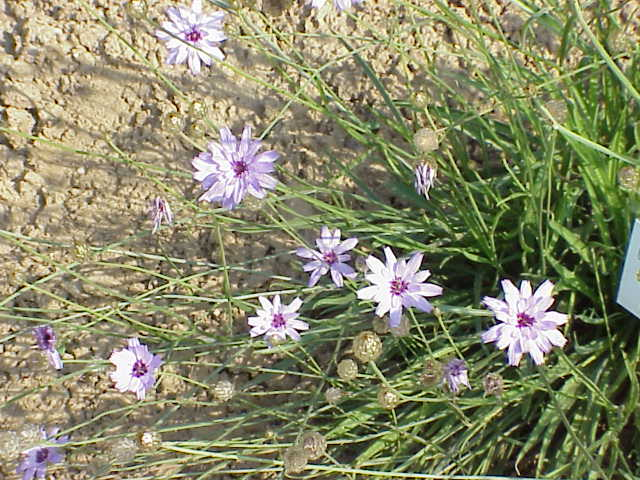

== Description ==
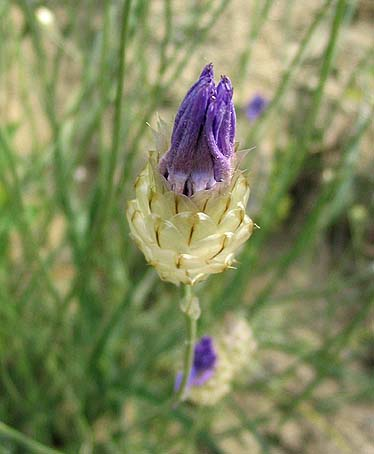
flowerbud

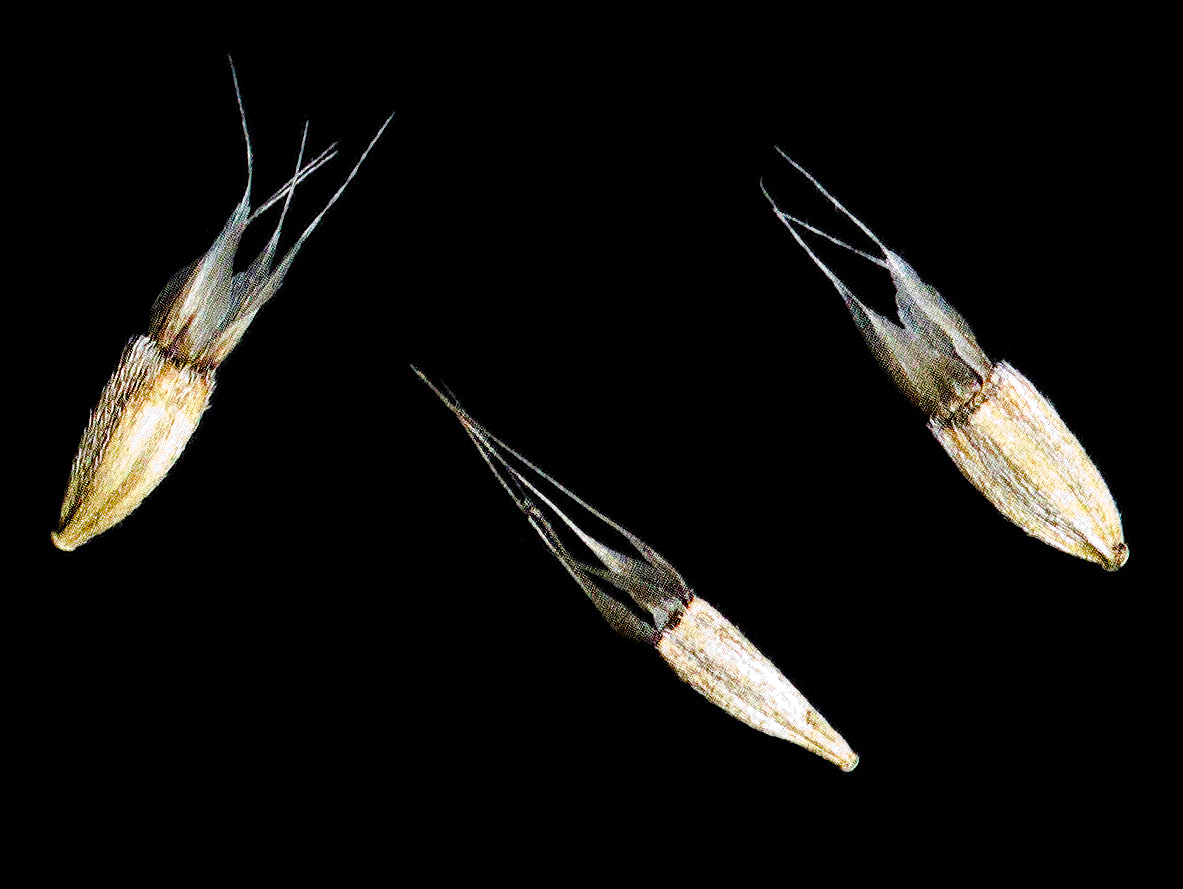
cypselas

Cupid's dart is a short-lived perennial herbaceous plant, of 20–90 cm (8-36 in) high. It has eighteen chromosomes (2n=18).

=== Leaves and stems ===
There is a basal rosette of many linear leaves of 2–20 cm long and .25-.75 cm wide, which may be entire or are pinnately incised, creating linear lobes mostly directed towards the tip. The leaves are covered in long soft woolly hairs (pilose) lying on the surface, giving both leaf surfaces a greyish green color. The leaf tips may be blunt or pointy, and the leaf blade gradually narrows to the main vein at the base of the leaf. From the heart of the rosette one or a few, strongly branched, erect, again woolly haired and greyish green flowering stems rise. These stems carry only a few leaves, similar to the basal leaves, but up to 30 cm long, with up to four lateral lobes.

=== Flowerheads, florets and fruits ===
Flowerheads are set individually at the end of a branch of up to 30 cm long, with a few small papery bracts, more densely set near the flowerhead. Flowerheads are enclosed in an involucre of 1.5–2.5 cm long, which has a diameter of 1–2 cm. The individual bracts are papery, egg-shaped, 1–2.5 cm long, 0.3–0.5 cm wide, hairless and ending abruptly in a small sharp point as a continuation of the darker colored midrib. The common base at which the florets are implanted (or receptacle) is flat, with a scale subtending every floret. The ligulate florets have a bluish purple strap ending in five teeth, 2.5–2.9 cm long, while the tube is darker. The one-seeded indehiscent fruit (called cypsela) is cylindrical with five to ten longitudinal ribs, 5–6 mm long, and is crowned with papery pappus scales. The pollen is yellow.

== Etymology ==
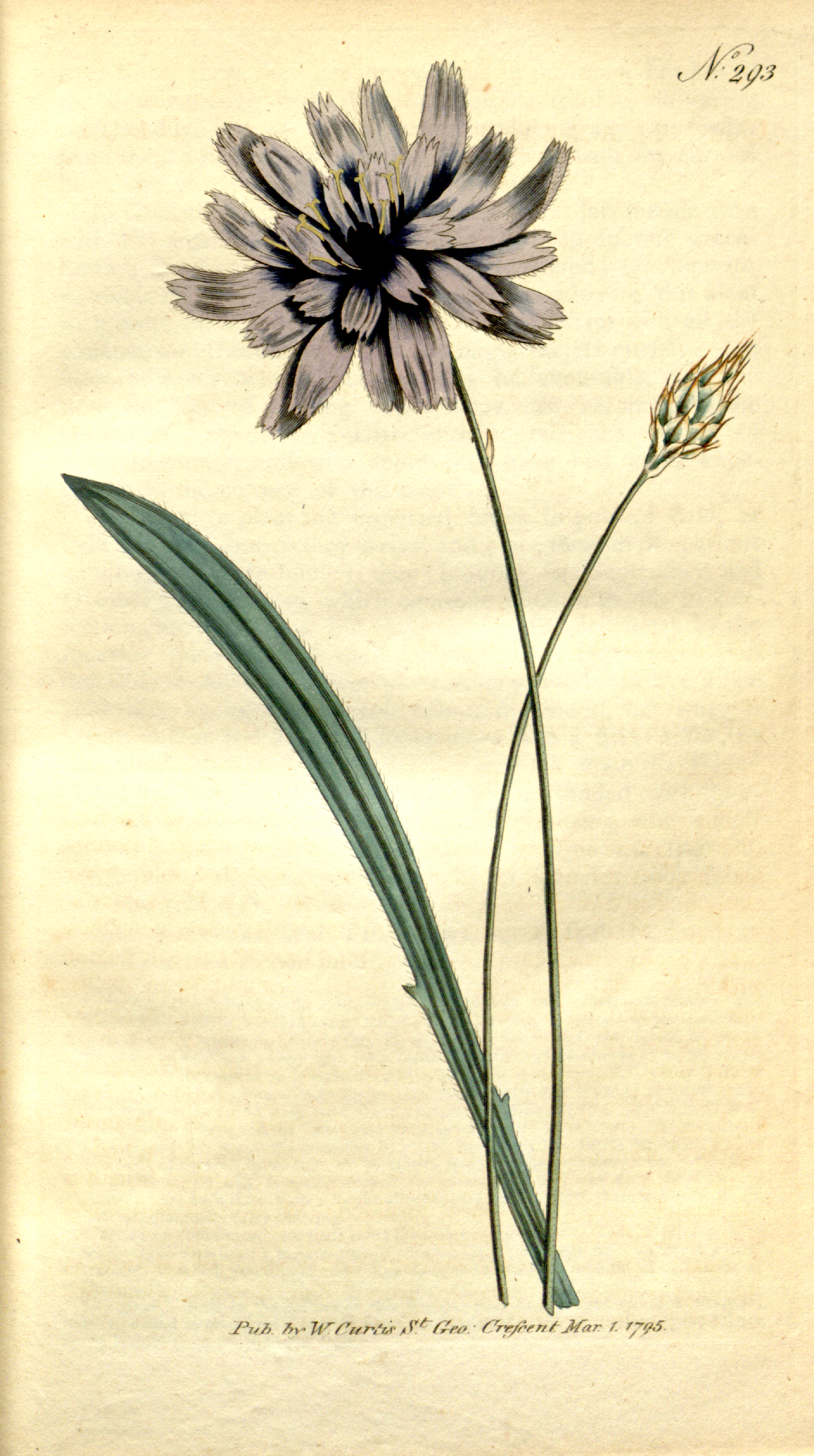
etching

The simple translation of the root words from the Greek κατάνάγκη (katanagkē), itself a contraction of κατά (kata), "down" and άνάγκη (anagkē), "force", is "compulsion", which is suggested to refer to the use of this plant in love potions, and is reflected in the vernacular name Cupid's dart. The species epithet caerulea is the Latin for "(heavenly) blue".

== Distribution ==
Cupid's dart occurs in the wild in western North-Africa (Morocco, Algeria, Tunisia and Libya) and south-western Europe (Portugal, Spain including the Balearic Islands, Andorra, France, and Italy). It is naturalized in Czechoslovakia and may temporarily occur elsewhere when it escapes from cultivation.

== Ecology ==
Catananche caerulea naturally occurs on disturbed, young or eroded, carbonaceous soils, in plant communities consisting of dwarf shrubs and perennials. It is often associated with different Cistaceae such as Fumana laevipes, Helianthemum apenninum, H. cinereum, H. marifolium, H. croceum, several Lamiaceae such as Lavandula latifolia, Rosmarinus palaui, Teucrium capitulatum, and T. haenseleri, several Asteraceae such as Rhaponticum coniferum, Scorzonera hispanica, Serratula flavescens and S. pinnatifida, few Fabaceae like Astragalus glaux and Ononis pusilla, parasites such as Cytinus ruber and Orobanche latisquama, and other species such as Aristolochia pistolochia, Euphorbia nicaeensis, Globularia vulgaris, Ruta chalepensis, and Viola arborescens.

== Cultivation ==
Catananche caerulea is grown in the garden as an ornamental short-lived perennial, which may re-seed spontaneously. It prefers full sun with good drainage. It is drought tolerant.

Several selections are grown, among which 'Amor Blue', 'Major', with larger flowers, 'Alba' and 'Amor White', white with purple floret tubes. The cultivar C. caerulea 'Major' has gained the Royal Horticultural Society's Award of Garden Merit. (confirmed 2017).
