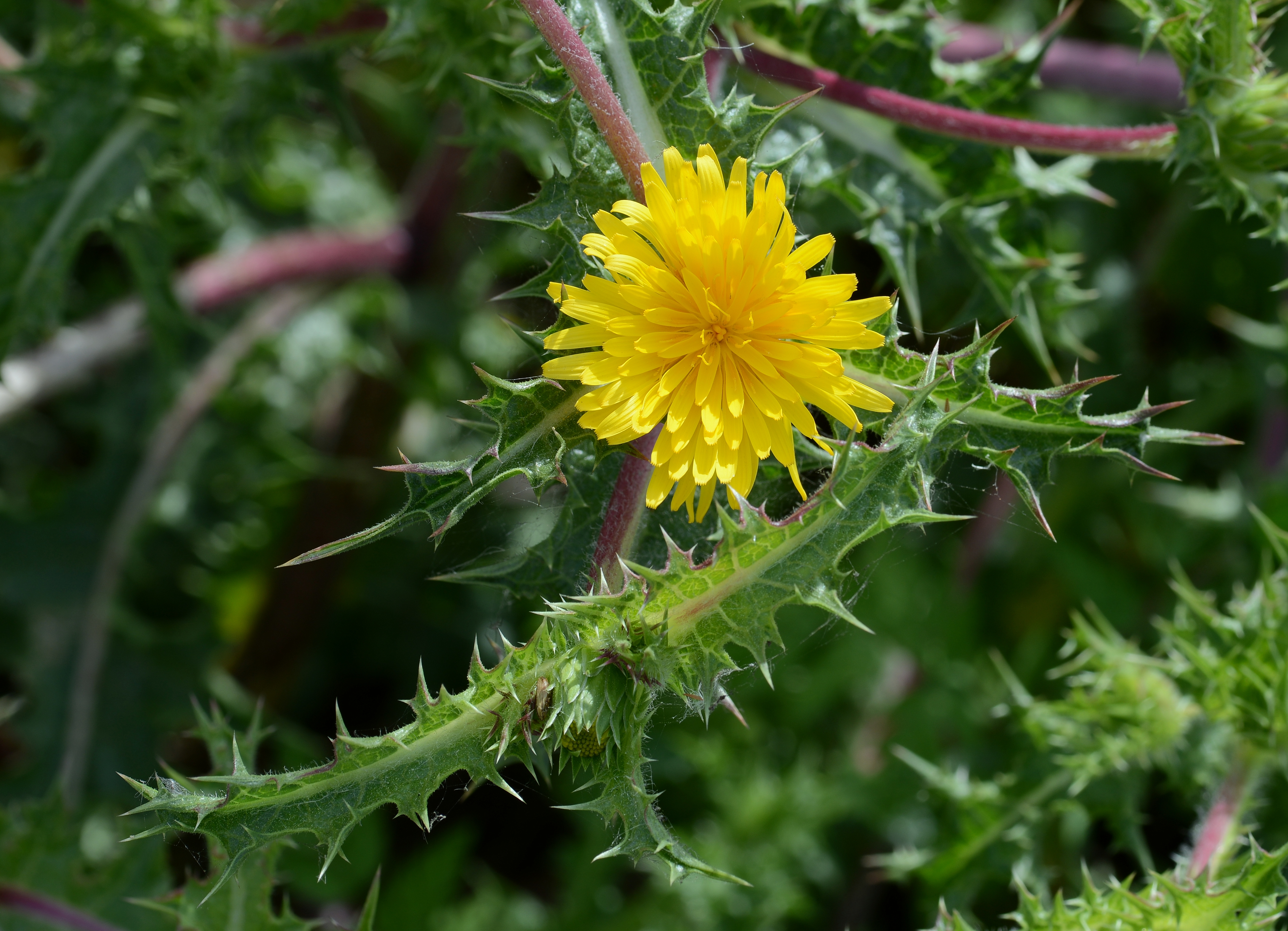
- Scolymus hispanicus

Scientific classification
- Kingdom: Plantae
- Clade: Tracheophytes
- Clade: Angiosperms
- Clade: Eudicots
- Clade: Asterids
- Order: Asterales
- Family: Asteraceae
- Subfamily: Cichorioideae
- Tribe: Cichorieae
- Subtribe: Scolyminae
- Genus: Scolymus; L.

Synonyms
- Scolymus subg. Myscolus Cass.; Myscolus (Cass.) Cass.

= Scolymus =

Genus of flowering plants

Scolymus is a genus of annual, biennial or perennial, herbaceous plants that is assigned to the family Asteraceae, and can be found in Macaronesia, around the Mediterranean, and in the Middle East. All species are spiny, thistle-like in appearance, with flowerheads that consist of yellow (rarely orange or white) ligulate florets, and canals that contain latex. It is sometimes called golden thistle or oyster thistle, and is known as سكوليمس (skwlyms) in Arabic and scolyme in French.

== Description ==
The species of Scolymus are spiny herbaceous annuals, biennials or perennials of up to 1¾ m high, that contain a milky latex. These have twenty chromosomes (2n=20).

=== Root, stem and leaves ===
Biannual and perennial plants produce a stout taproot of up to 8 cm in diameter and 60 cm long. Young plants consist of a rosette of leaves, which may be variegated, once-pinnately spiny-lobed, to 30 cm long, and having short, fleshy stalks. The stems can be simple or carry many branches, and carry spiny wings along their lengths. The wavy leaves with prominent veins are pinnately divided and are alternately set along the stems. The leaf margin has prominent pale green or yellow veins and large teeth which are topped by fierce spines. The leaf surface may initially be covered in soft, felty hairs, which quickly clear away, most slowly on the veins.

=== Inflorescence, flowers and fruits ===
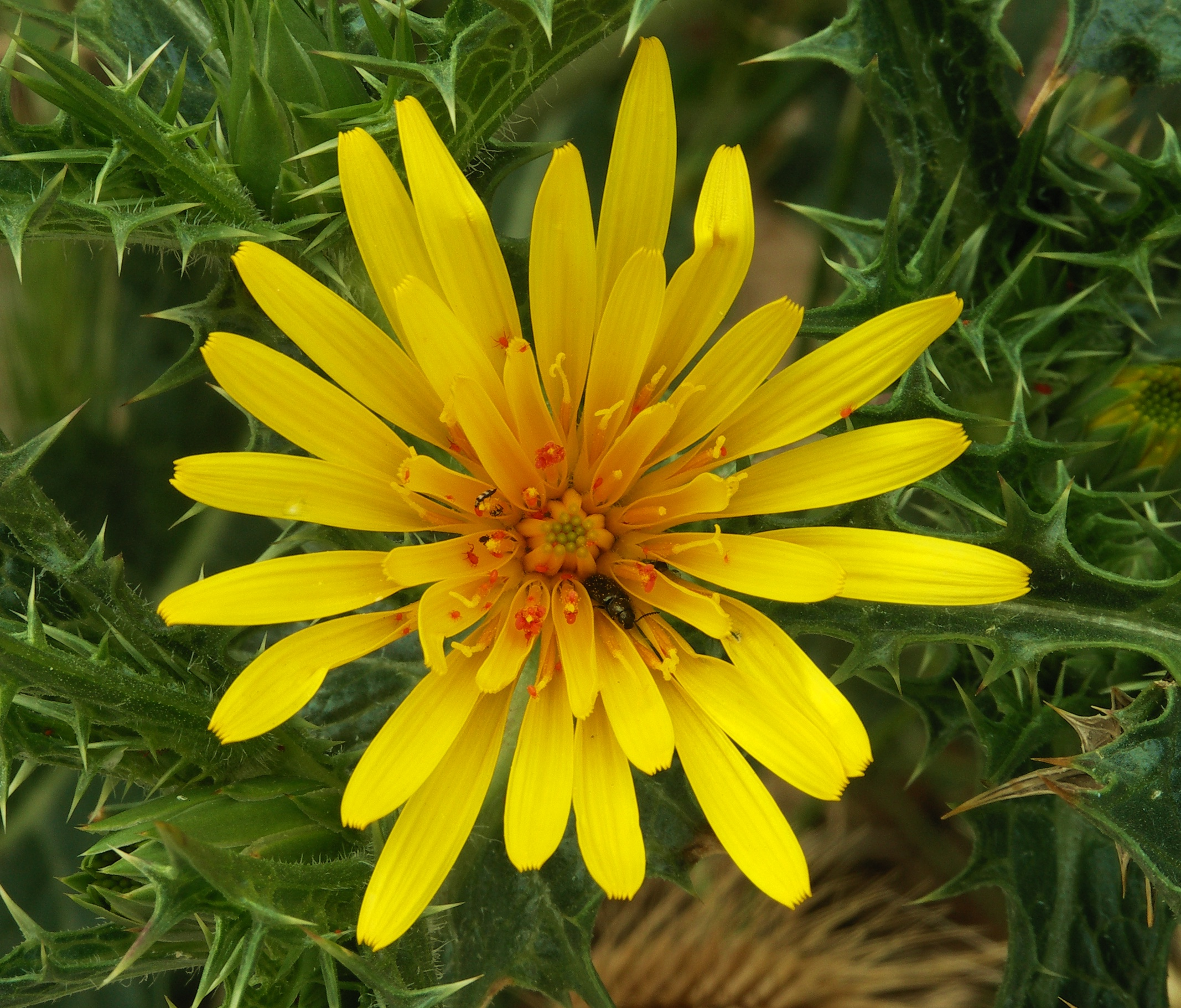
flowerhead of S. hispanicus with mites and beetles

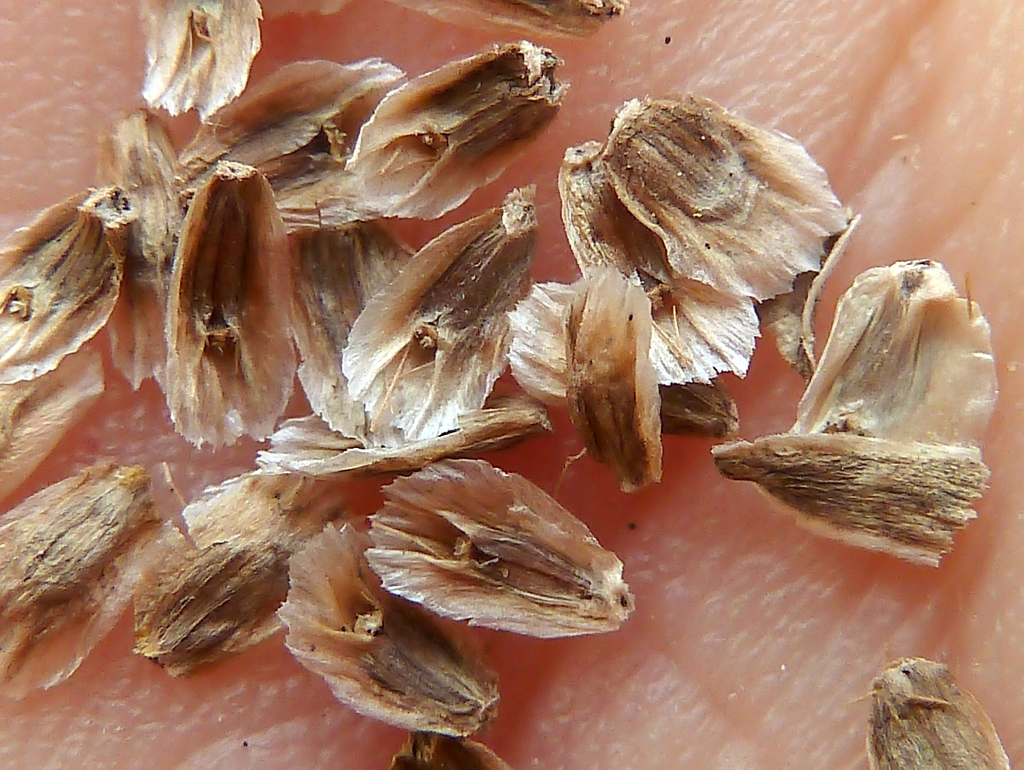
cypselas encased in their paleae

The flowerheads are seated at the end of the stem or in the limbs of the higher leaves, are arranged in a spike or a globose cluster and are subtended by two to more than five leaflike bracts. Each flowerhead is circled by an involucre that consists of many spine-tipped bracts in several rows, the outer papery and shorter than the inner ones, which are leaflike in consistency. These surround the common floral base (or receptacle), which is conical in shape and is set with ovate papery bracts called chaff or paleae. Implanted are dorsally compressed cypselas, each enclosed by a palea, the outer rows higher than the inner ones. On top of the cypselas there may be two to five stiff scabrous bristles, which are equivalent to sepals (and are called pappus). Also, on top of the cypsela and within the pappus is a yellow, orange or white strap-like corolla which ends in five teeth, together comprising a ligulate floret.

=== Characters common to all Asteraceae ===
Like in all Asteraceae, the pentameric flowers have anthers that are fused together forming a tube through which the style grows. The style picks up the pollen on hairs along its length and splits into two style branches at its tip. These parts sit on an inferior ovary that grows into an indehiscent fruit in which only one seed develops (a so-called cypsela). All florets are set on a common base (the receptacle), and are surrounded by several rows of bracts, that form an involucre.

=== Characters common to Cichorieae ===
Golden thistles are assigned to the Cichorieae tribe that shares anastomosing latex canals in both root, stem and leaves, and has flower heads only consisting of one type of floret. In Scolymus these are ligulate florets, common to the group except for Warionia and Gundelia, which only have disk florets. A unique character setting Scolymus apart from the other Cichorieae are the dorsally compressed cypsellas which are surrounded by scales (or paleae).

=== Differences between the species ===
S. maculatus is an annual of up to 1½ m high, there are more than five leaflike bracts subtending each globose cluster of flowerheads, and these bracts are pinnately divided. The yellow florets carry some black hairs. The cypselas do not have pappus at their top (but are encased by the paleae). The spined wings along the stems are uninterrupted. Leaves have a whitish vein along their margin.

S. grandiflorus is an annual or biennial of up to ¾ m high with one, two or three leaflike bracts subtending each cluster of flowerheads and these are spiny dentate. The yellow to orange florets do not have black hairs. The cypselas are topped by three to seven bristles of smooth pappus hairs (and are encased by the paleae). The spined wings along the stems are uninterrupted.

S. hispanicus is an annual, biennial or perennial of up to 1¾ m high and it also has one, two or three spiny dentate leaflike bracts subtending each cluster of flowerheads and the yellow, orange or white florets also lack black hairs. The cypselas however are topped by two to five bristles of scabrous pappus hairs (and are encased by the paleae). In this species the spined wings along the stems are interrupted.

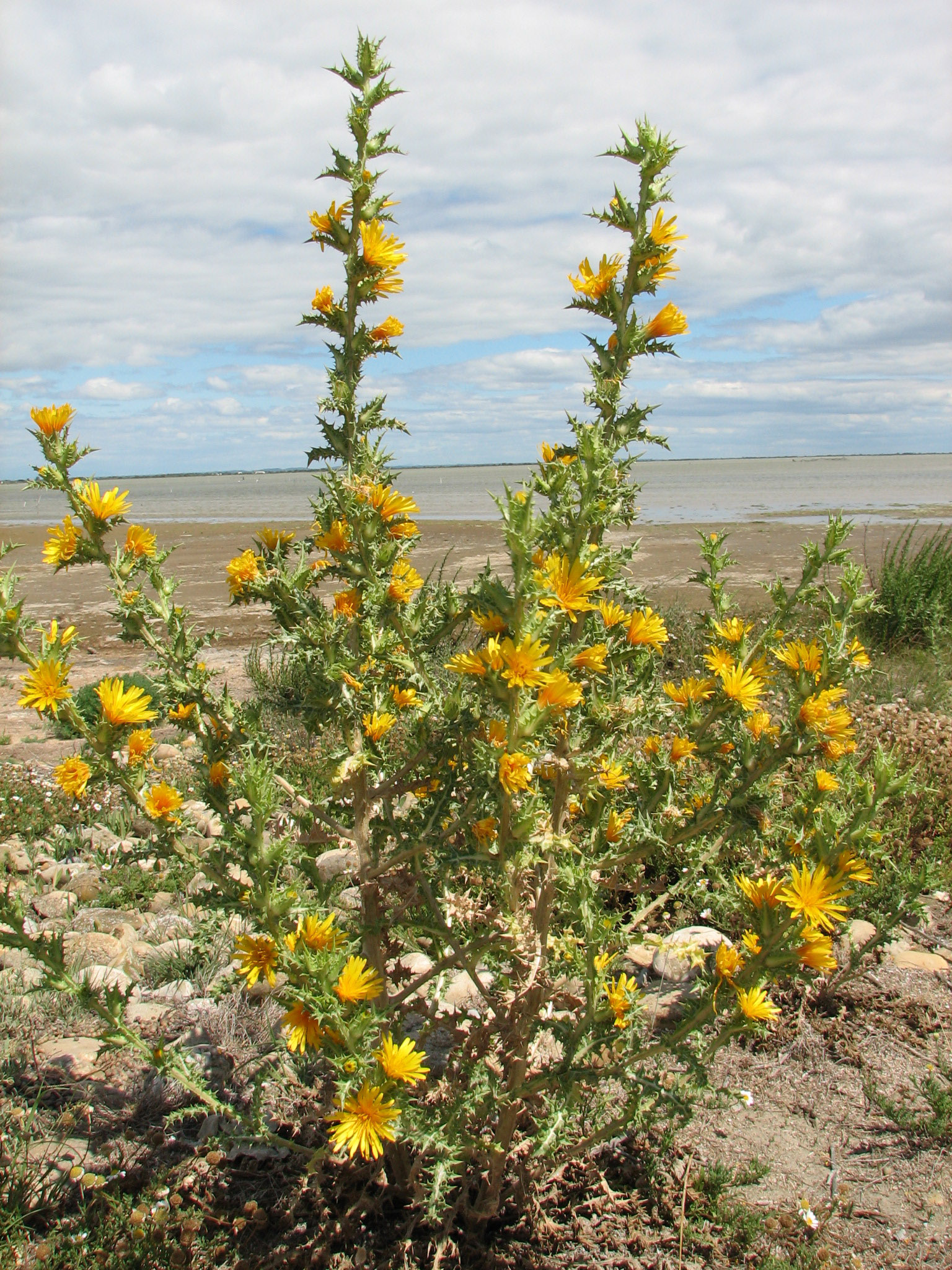
Scolymus hispanicus

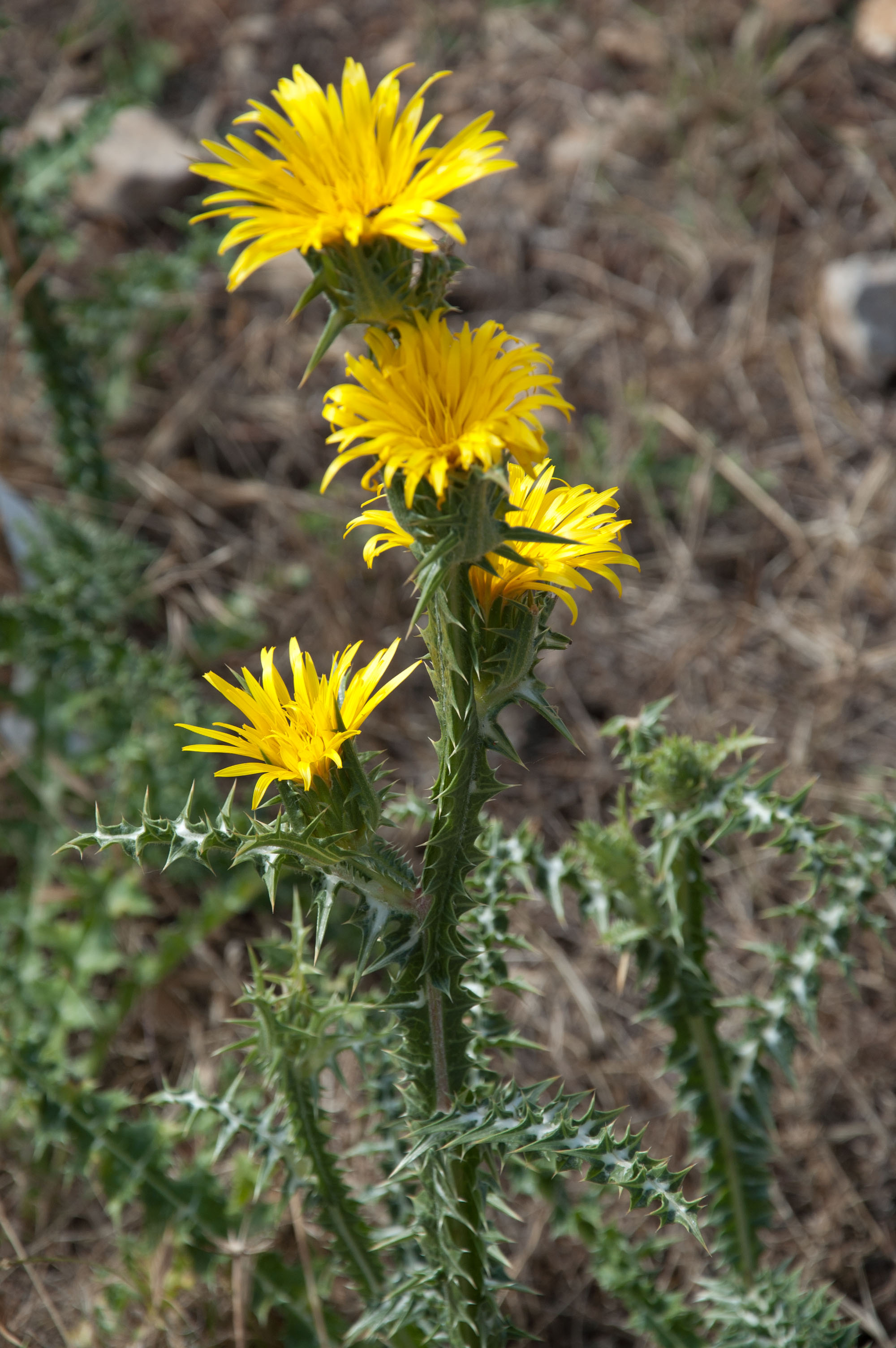
Scolymus grandiflorus

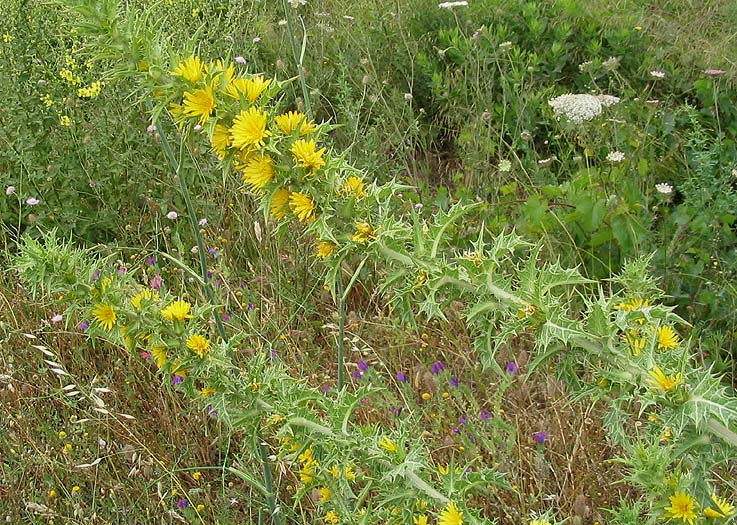
Scolymus maculatus

== Taxonomy ==
=== Taxonomic history ===
In 1576 Carolus Clusius describes Scolimus Theophrasti (= S. hispanicus). In 1601 he extends the genus to three taxa, Scolymus Theophrasti Hispan. (= S. hispanicus subsp. hispanicus), S. Theophrasti Narbonensis (= S. maculatus), and Scolymus Dioscor. Castos Theophrasti (= S. grandiflorus). Rembert Dodoens in 1583 and Francesco Cupani in 1713 introduce the name Carduus Chrysanthemus (for S. maculatus), while in Johann Bauhin’s posthumously published great work, Historia plantarum universalis (1650-51), it is called Spina lutea, and Robert Morison in 1699 referred to S. hispanicus as Cichorium luteum. Since all of these names predate the start of the Linnean nomenclature in 1753, neither of these were valid. In 1753 Carl Linnaeus referred to the description Joseph Pitton de Tournefort made in 1700, providing the valid scientific name Scolymus.

=== Subdivisions ===
Generally two sections are recognised.

- Scolymus, containing one species:
  - S. maculatus is a species showing very little variability, and no hybrids occur where it grows together with S. hispanicus.
- Myscolus, containing two species
  - S. grandiflorus has some variability, particularly in the presence of soft hairs on the back of the leaves, but this is not regarded sufficient to distinguish between subtaxa.
  - S. hispanicus has quite some variability, and two subspecies have been distinguished.
    - subsp. occidentalis
    - subsp. hispanicum, which could be subdivided
      - var. aggregatus
      - var. aurantiacus
      - var. hispanicus

=== Phylogeny ===
According to recent genetic analyses, the genus Scolymus is related to the genera Hymenonema, Catananche and Gundelia. This results in the following relationship tree.

- subtribe Scolyminae
  - Gundelia
  - - Catananche
    - - Hymenonema
      - genus Scolymus
        - S. maculatus
        - - S. grandiflorus
          - S. hispanicus

=== Etymology ===
The genus name Scolymus derives from the Greek σχόλυμος (skolymus) meaning "artichoke". Pliny used this name for Scolymus hispanicus. The species name hispanicus is Latin and means "from Spain", while maculatus is Latin and means "spotted", and grandiflorus is also Latin and means "large-flowered".

== Distribution ==
- Scolymus grandiflorus occurs in Spain including the Balearic Islands and the Canary Islands, southern France including Corsica, Italy including Sardinia, Turkey, Lebanon, Libya, Algeria, Tunisia and Morocco.
- Scolymus hispanicus can be found from northwestern France southwards to Morocco, and in the east from Ukraine to Iran. It is also naturalized in Australia, United States, Argentina and Chile.
- Scolymus maculatus grows from Britain to the Canary Islands, throughout the Mediterranean eastwards to Iran. This species is naturalized in Australia and in North Carolina.

== Ecology ==
Scolymus hispanicus it said to grow in the centre of Spain along roads and paths, particularly in unstable, loose and poor soils. The also grow in arable lands, both cultivated and fallowed, and in pastures. The florets are pollinated by insects.

== Use ==
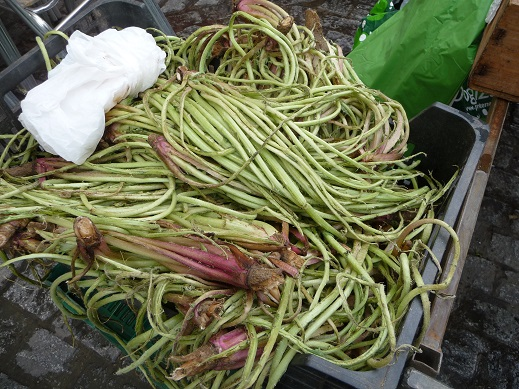
leaves stripped to the middle vein for sale as vegetables

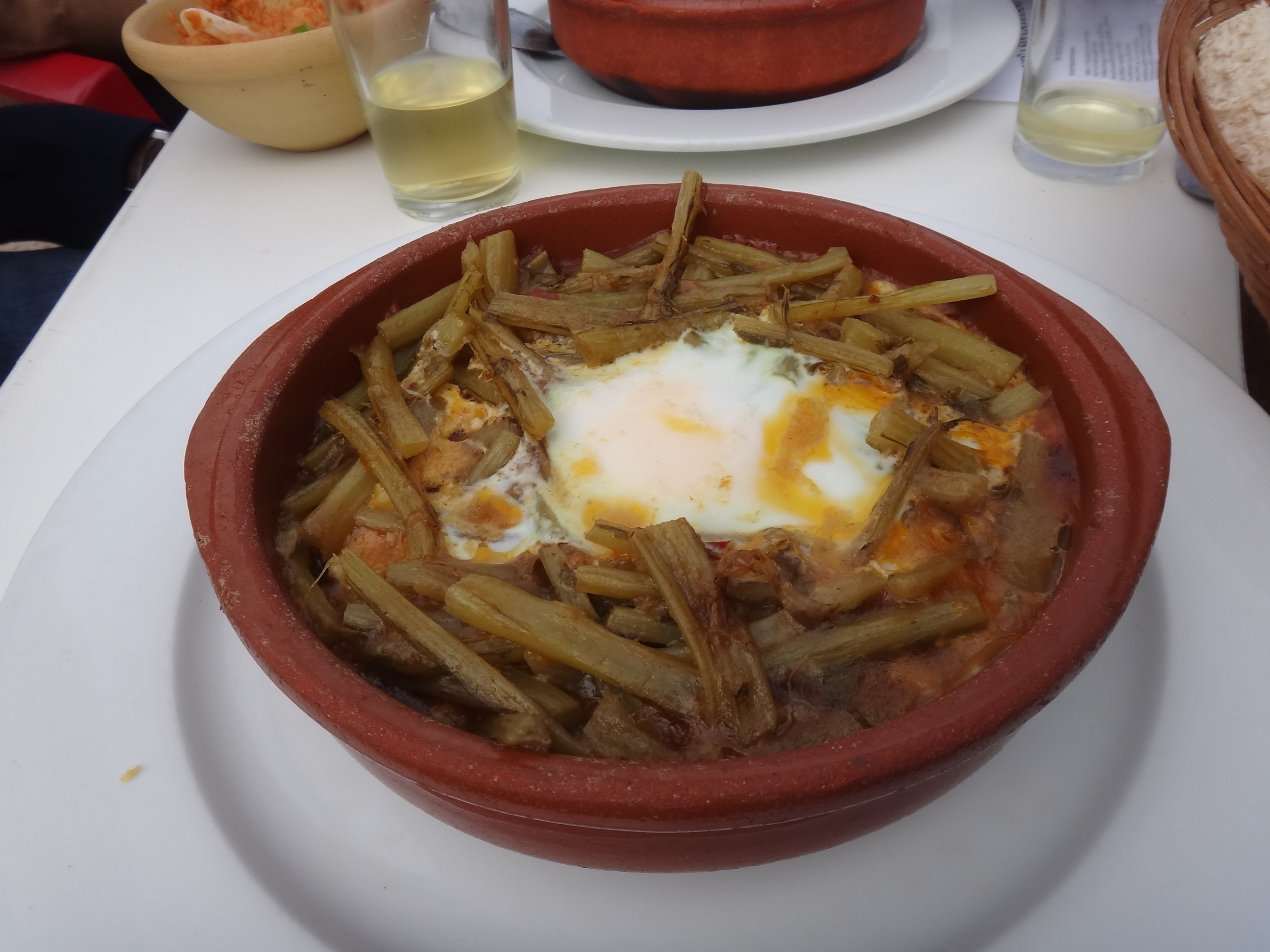
cooked egg on midveins of golden thistle

Around the Mediterranean, such as in Portugal, Spain, Morocco, Italy, Greece, Cyprus and Turkey, the midveins of the rosette leaves of S. hispanicus, known in Spain as cardillo or tagarnina, are used as a popular wild food. It is generally gathered in April and May. These midveins are preboiled and lightly fried with garlic in olive oil. These serve as garnish for cocido. Fried cardillo is further combined with garlic, cured ham, and hard-boiled or scrambled eggs. Midveins are also used raw in salads. The roots are cooked and eaten, and compare in taste to salsify. Roasted roots have been used as a coffee substitute. Florets have been used as imitation saffron.

The root bark of S. hispanicus has been shown to contain the triterpenoid taraxasteryl acetate, and this substance is effective in suppressing spasms. In Turkey it is a component of a herbal elixir called lityazol çemil.

Studies have indicated that Scolymus might be used for the bio-removal of cadmium, with the highest concentration measured over 50 μg/g dry weight, and of methylene blue and Eriochrome Black T.
