= Waria =

Waria may refer to:

- Waria River
- Waria, India, a locality in West Bengal
- IK Waria, a Swedish football club
- Waria (person), a portmanteau word for traditional male-to-female persons in Indonesia
- Waria Rural LLG in Papua New Guinea
