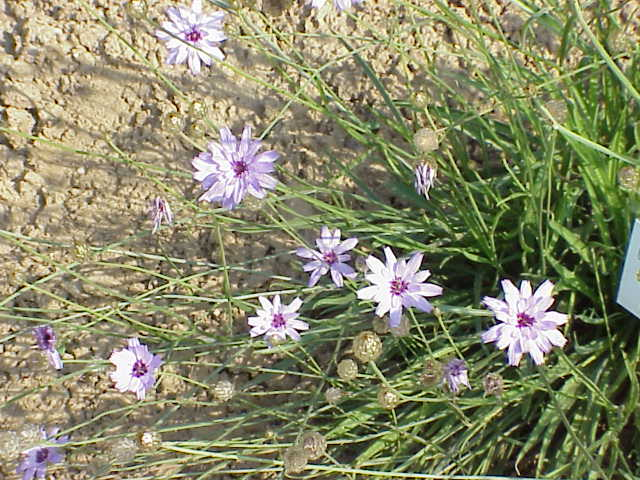
- Catananche caerulea

Scientific classification
- Kingdom: Plantae
- Clade: Tracheophytes
- Clade: Angiosperms
- Clade: Eudicots
- Clade: Asterids
- Order: Asterales
- Family: Asteraceae
- Subfamily: Cichorioideae
- Tribe: Cichorieae
- Subtribe: Scolyminae
- Genus: Catananche; L.

Synonyms
- Cupidonia Bubani; Piptocephalum Sch.Bip.

= Catananche =

Genus of flowering plants

Catananche is a genus of flowering plants in the family Asteraceae. It is native to dry meadows in the Mediterranean region.

They are cultivated for their cornflower-like blooms appearing in summer, in shades of blue, yellow and white. They are suitable for a sunny border, and for dried flower arrangements.

Species

- Catananche arenaria Coss. & Durieu - Libya, Tunisia, Algeria, Morocco, Western Sahara, Mauritania
- Catananche caerulea L. - Spain, Portugal, France, Italy, Libya, Tunisia, Algeria, Morocco
- Catananche caespitosa Desf. - Algeria, Morocco
- Catananche lutea L. - Spain, Portugal, France, Italy, Greece, Macedonia, Turkey, Cyprus, Syria, Lebanon, Palestine, Libya, Tunisia, Algeria, Morocco
- Catananche montana Coss. & Durieu - Algeria, Morocco

== Phylogeny ==
According to recent genetic analyses, the genus Catananche is related to the genera Hymenonema, Scolymus and Gundelia. This results in the following relationship tree.

- subtribe Scolyminae
  - Gundelia
  - - Catananche
    - - Hymenonema
      - Scolymus
