= Adrien Warion =

French military physician and botanist (1837–1880)

- Born: April 21, 1837; Sarralbe (France)
- Died: March 4, 1880 (aged 42); Perpignan (France)
- Occupations: military doctor and botanist
- Known for: plant collection

Jean Pierre Adrien Warion (21 April 1837 - 4 March 1880) was a French medical doctor employed by the French army, and he collected plants between 1861 and 1878.

Warion was born in Sarralbe, a small town in the department of Moselle, on 21 April 1837. He was the son of a bookseller from Metz, who settled after the war in Dijon to retain his French citizenship. He voluntarily entered military service in 1858, for which he trained at the École de Strasbourg. He became a medical doctor in 1861, and was appointed as assistant-major of the 2nd class and sent to work in the military hospitals in Rome, which was at that time occupied by France. During his three-year stay he studied the flora particularly around Civitavecchia, Rome and Frascati. Some of the plants he collected were new to science. In 1864 he was transferred to Algeria, where he stayed for five years and collected plants primarily in the Oran Province and in 1866 he visited Morocco, such as Figuig. Until 1867 he explored the surroundings of Mascara, Saïda, Frenda, El Bayadh (Géryville), and parts of the Hautes Plaines, including the Chott Ech Chergui and the sabkha in the Naâma Province. In 1869 he was appointed at the military hospital in Vincennes, and he supported the army during the Franco-Prussian War of 1870-1871, in particular dealing with the wounded from the battles at Gravelotte and Borni. In 1871 he returned to Algeria and resumed his plant collecting. Plants Warion collected for science for the first time include Mentha cervina, Trisetum vallesiacum, Linaria heterophylla and Cuscuta corymbosa. He also collected on the Canary Islands and in France. In 1878, Warion edited and distributed the exsiccata series Plantae atlanticae selectae.

Warion became a member of the Société botanique de France in 1856. He sent collections to Ernest Cosson, and collected in northern Africa with Ibrahim Ammeribt. Several plant taxa were named in his honour including Warionia saharae, Astragalus peregrinus subsp. warionis, Avellinia warionis (= Avellinia michelii) and Linaria warionis.
