= Waria River =

River in Papua New Guinea

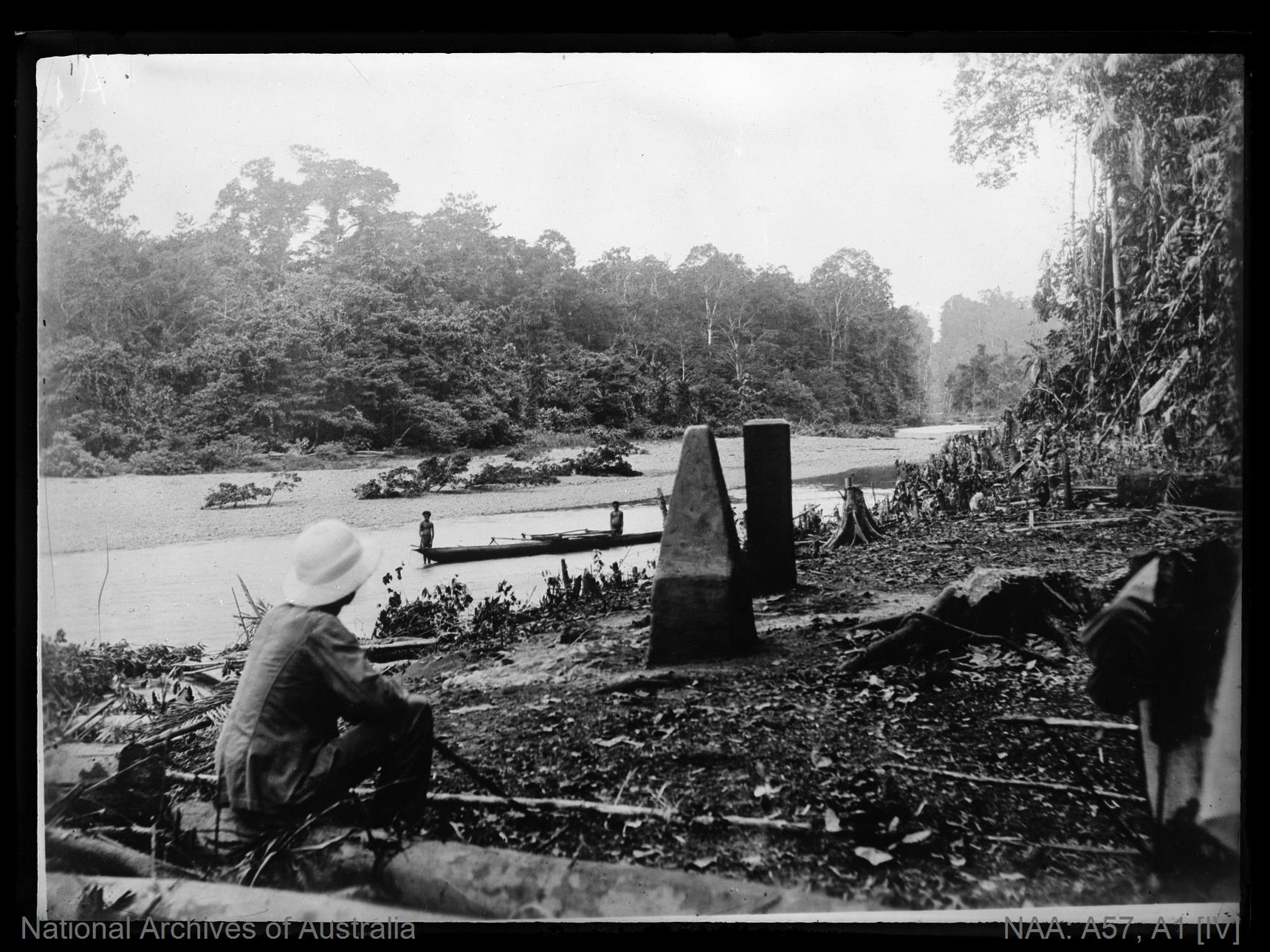
- Surveyor Gustav Sabine at the Waria River
- Native name: Baridza (Zia)

Location
- Country: Papua New Guinea
- Region: Morobe Province and Madang Province

Physical characteristics
- Source
  - location: Papua New Guinea
- Mouth
  - location: Markham River

The Waria River is a river in Oro Province and Morobe Province in south-eastern Papua New Guinea. It flows into the Solomon Sea. The river is fast-flowing with heavy sediment. The lower Waria Valley is home to the indigenous Zia people, flowing through the communities of Pema, Popoe and Saigara. Australian anthropologist Ernest Chinnery discovered the source of the river in the 1910s.

== See also ==
- Waria Rural LLG
