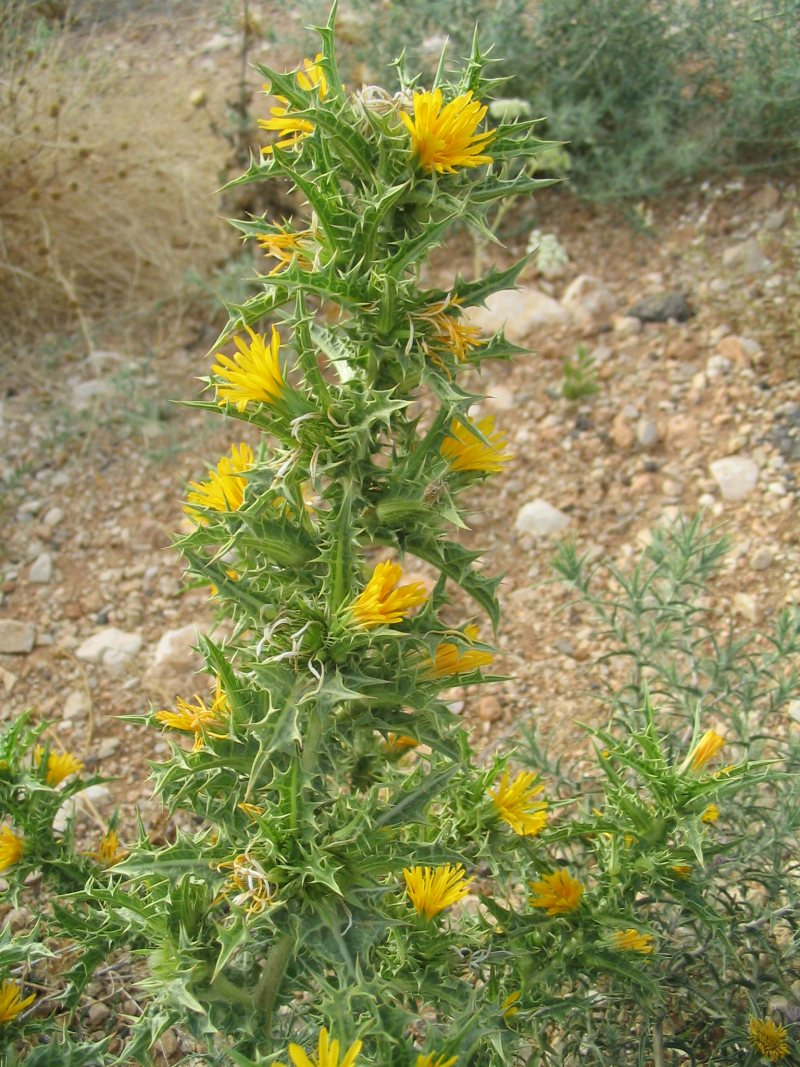

Scientific classification
- Kingdom: Plantae
- Clade: Tracheophytes
- Clade: Angiosperms
- Clade: Eudicots
- Clade: Asterids
- Order: Asterales
- Family: Asteraceae
- Genus: Scolymus
- Species: S. hispanicus

Binomial name
- Scolymus hispanicus L.

= Scolymus hispanicus =

Species of flowering plant

Scolymus hispanicus, the common golden thistle or Spanish oyster thistle, is a flowering plant in the genus Scolymus in the family Asteraceae, native to southern and western Europe, north to northwestern France.

It is a herbaceous biennial or short-lived perennial plant growing to 80 cm tall, with spiny stems and leaves. The flowerheads are bright yellow to orange-yellow, 2–3 cm diameter

== Uses ==
Since at least the time of Theophrastus in ancient Greece, this plant has been known for medicinal and culinary uses. Although it has been cultivated at times, currently most of the plant which is consumed comes from harvesting wild plants. In parts of Spain, it is eaten in stews during spring. It is also used in salads and soups, and it is served with scrambled eggs in Extremadura and Andalusia, Spain, where it is called tagarnina. In the sixteenth century in Salamanca, the washed young plants used to be eaten with their root, either raw or in stews with meat.

In parts of southern Italy, the leaves are only gathered during Holy Week, after which they are used to bake a meat pie to be eaten on Easter.

== Renamed taxa ==
- Scolymus hispanicus subsp. grandiflorus = S. grandiflorus

== Gallery ==
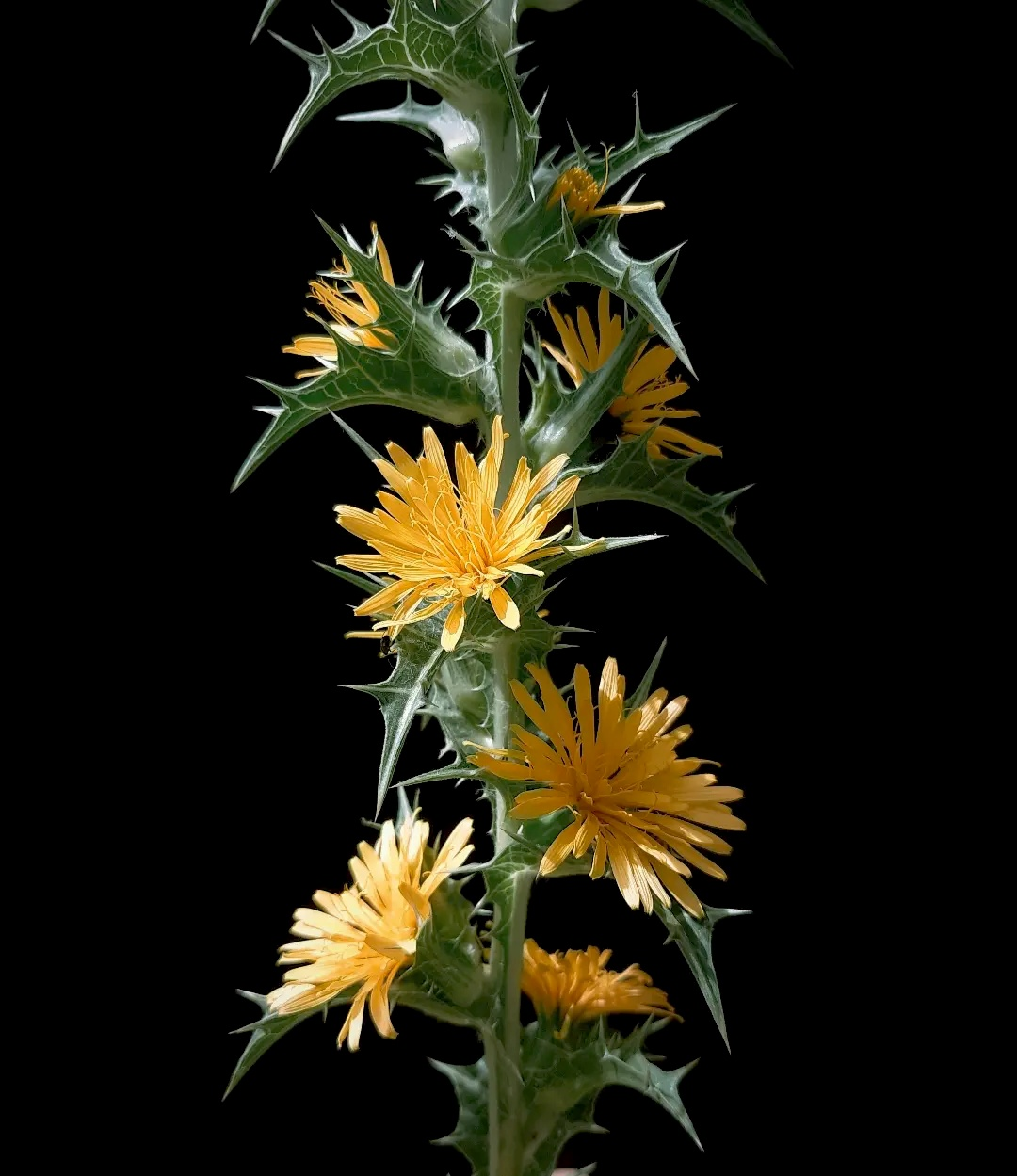
Scolymus hispanicus inflorescence

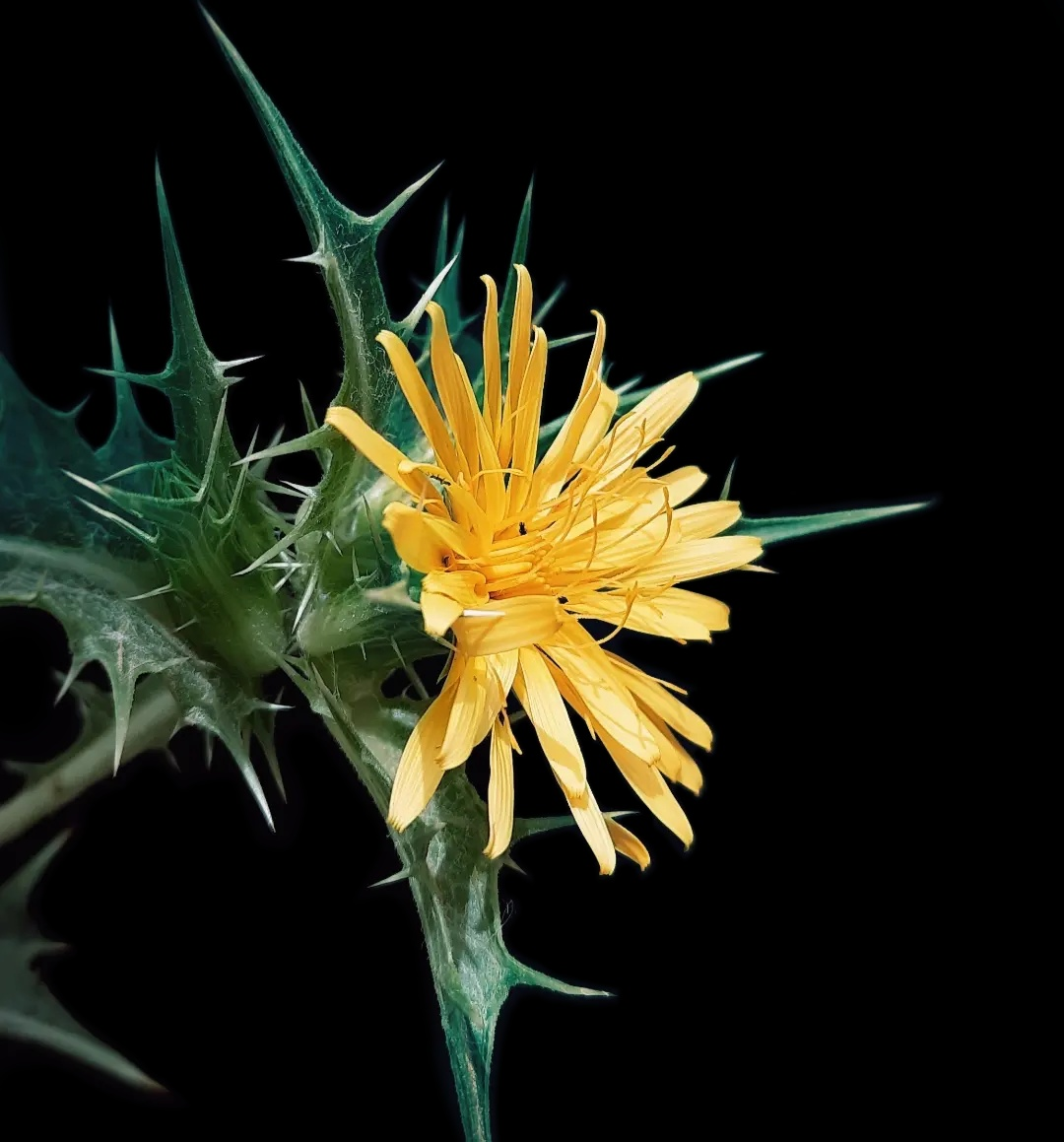
inflorescence yellow flower

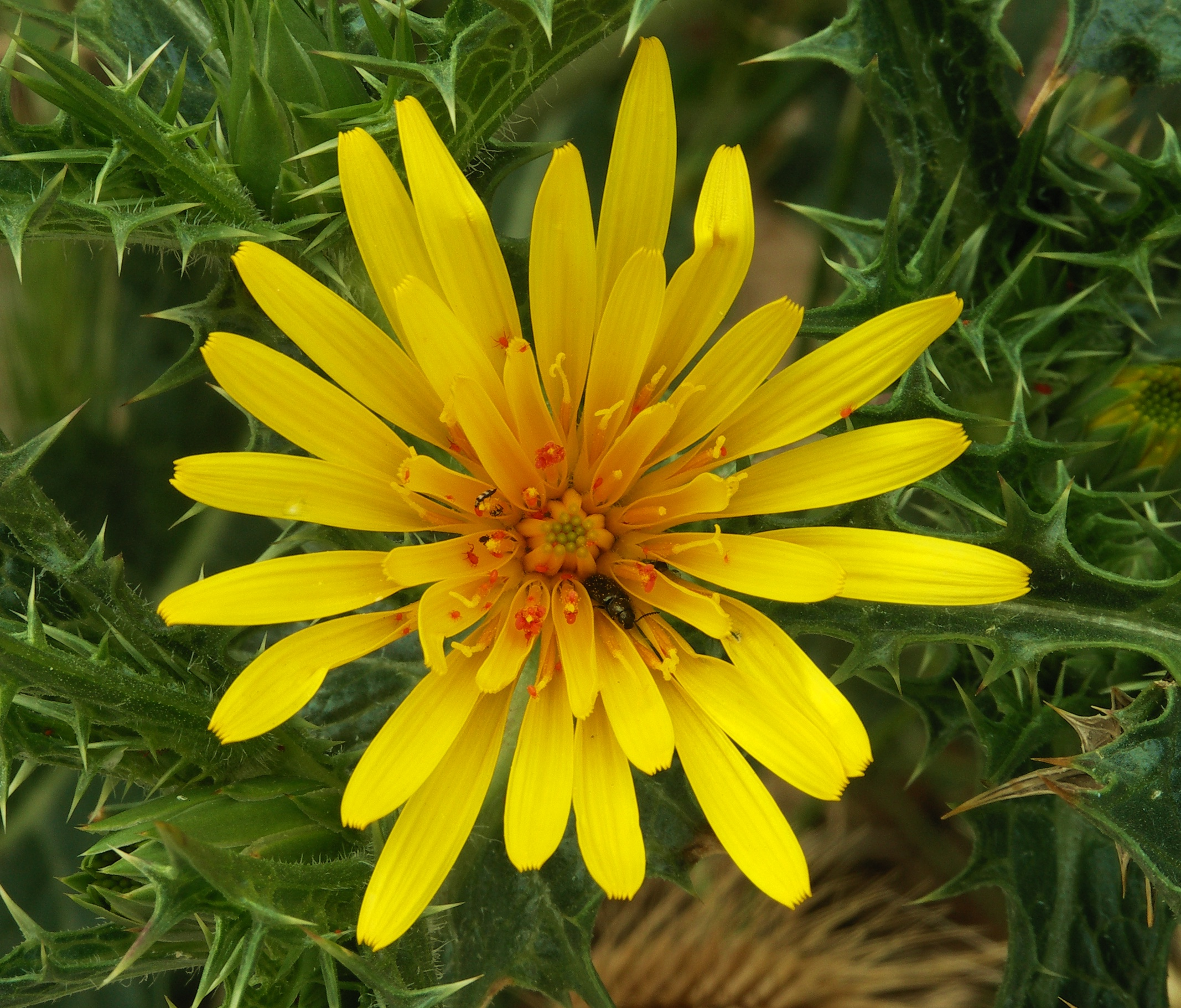
Spanish oyster flower

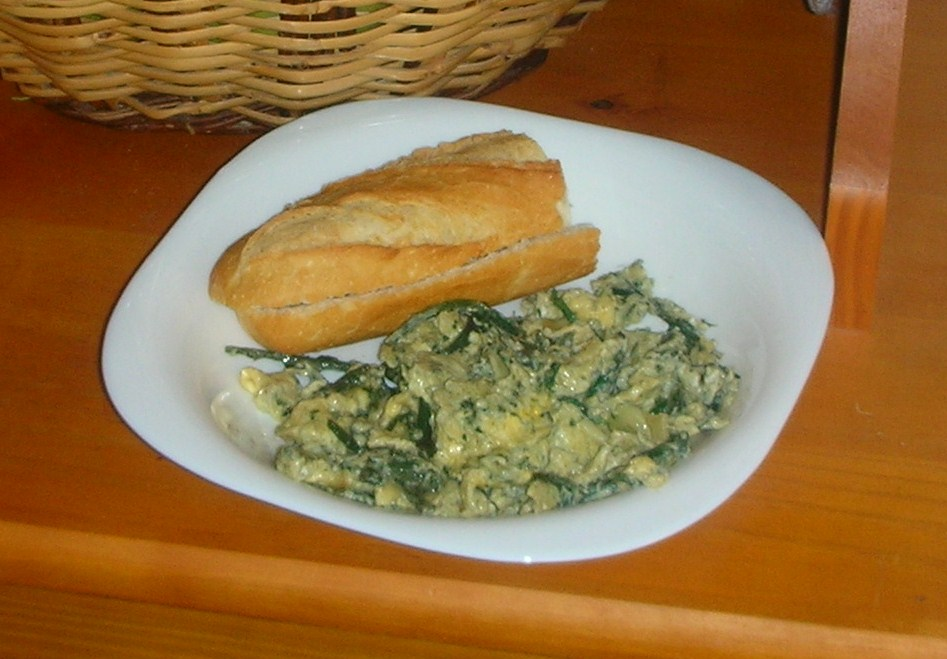
Scrambled eggs with Spanish oyster and bread

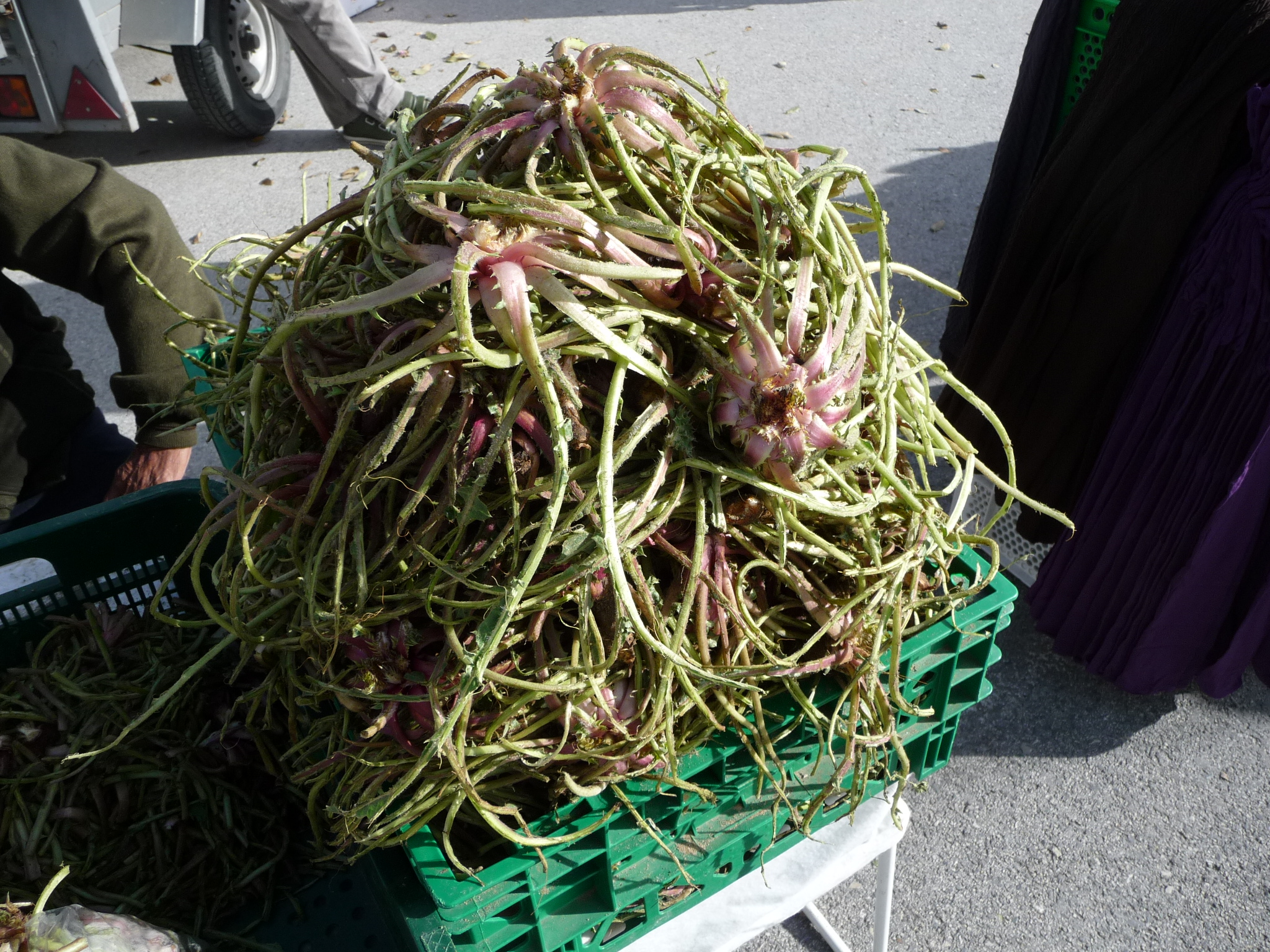
Spanish oyster harvested for cooking
