= Waria Rural LLG =

Local-level government in Papua New Guinea

- Location within Papua New Guinea
- Coordinates: 7.888496°S 147.145332°E
- Country: Papua New Guinea
- Province: Morobe Province

Area
  - Total: 3,171 km^{2} (1,224 sq mi)

Population (2011 census)
  - Total: 11,381
  - Density: 3.589/km^{2} (9.296/sq mi)
- Time zone: UTC+10 (AEST)

Waria Rural LLG is a local-level government (LLG) of Morobe Province, Papua New Guinea.

== Wards ==
- 01. Saiwarika
- 02. Arabuka
- 03. Gusuwe
- 04. Pagau
- 05. Kasuma
- 06. Gataipa
- 07. Sim
- 08. Wisi
- 09. Kasangare
- 10. Timanigosa
- 11. Garaina Station
- 12. Garaina
- 13. Tiaura
- 14. Peira
- 15. Garasa
- 16. Ohe
- 17. Biawaria

== See also ==
- Waria River
