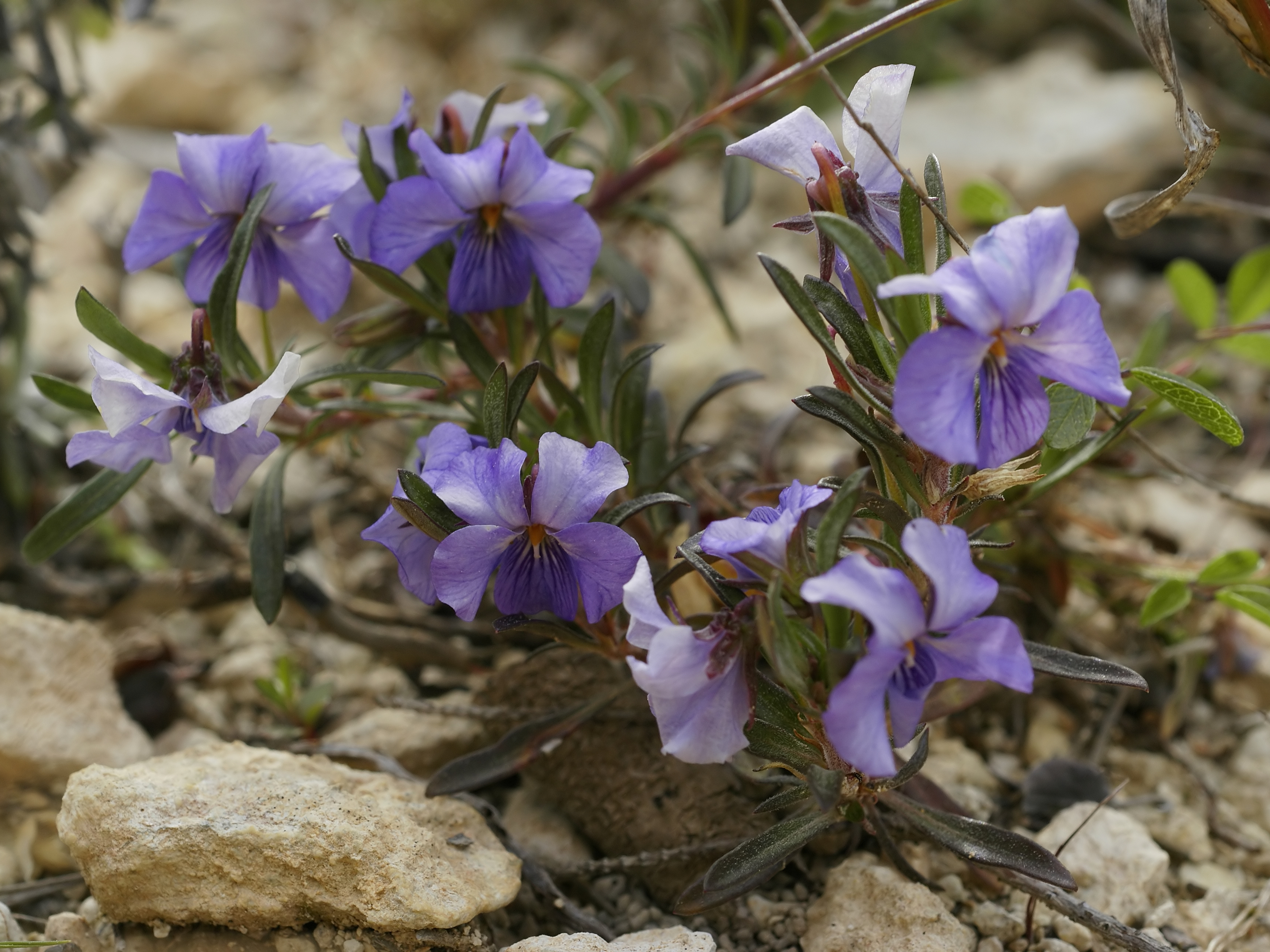

Scientific classification
- Kingdom: Plantae
- Clade: Tracheophytes
- Clade: Angiosperms
- Clade: Eudicots
- Clade: Rosids
- Order: Malpighiales
- Family: Violaceae
- Genus: Viola
- Species: V. arborescens

Binomial name
- Viola arborescens L.

= Viola arborescens =

Species of flowering plant

Viola arborescens is a species of Viola and is also known as the tree violet. The average height is anywhere from 8 to 10 inches. Viola arborescens requires direct sunlight to grow. Viola arborescens is very cold hardy, and is in bloom all winter and into early spring.

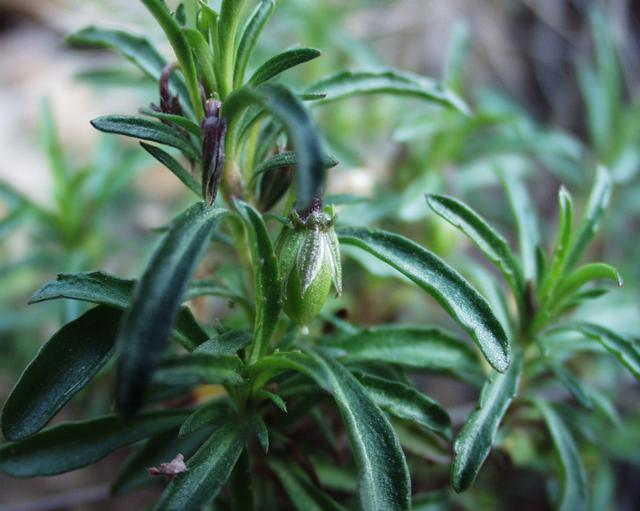

== Color ==
The Viola arborescens displays color all winter and into early spring. Typical natural colors include magenta, gold, light blue, dark purple, maroon and off-white.

== Distribution ==
Viola arborescens is native to the western Mediterranean Basin. It is found in southern France, Sardinia and the Balearic Islands, eastern and southern Spain, southwestern Portugal (around the Sagres Point), Morocco and Algeria.
