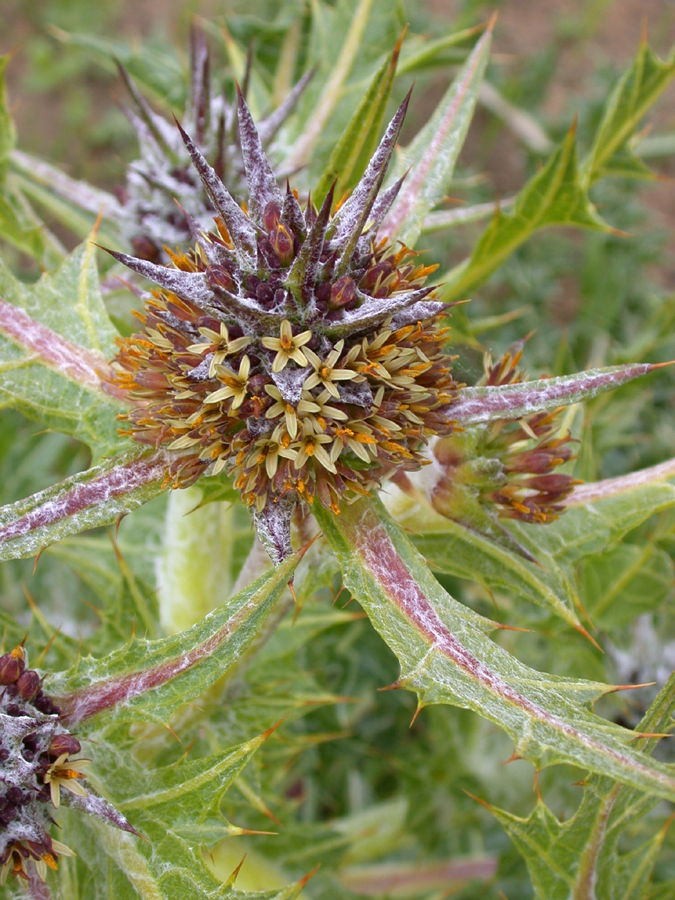
- Gundelia tournefortii

Scientific classification
- Kingdom: Plantae
- Clade: Tracheophytes
- Clade: Angiosperms
- Clade: Eudicots
- Clade: Asterids
- Order: Asterales
- Family: Asteraceae
- Tribe: Cichorieae
- Subtribe: Scolyminae
- Genus: Gundelia; L.

Type species
- Gundelia tournefortii L.

Synonyms
- Gundelia glabra Mill.; Gundelia tenuisecta (Boiss.) Freyn & Sint.; Gundelia tournefortii var. araneosae DC.; Gundelia tournefortii var. glabra (Mill.) DC.; Gundelia tournefortii var. tenuisecta Boiss.; Gundelsheimera Cass.

= Gundelia =

Genus of flowering plants

Gundelia or tumble thistle is a low to high (20–100 centimetres or 8–39 1/2 inches) thistle-like perennial herbaceous plant with latex, spiny compound inflorescences, reminiscent of teasles and eryngos, that contain cream, yellow, greenish, pink, purple or redish-purple disk florets. It is assigned to the family Asteraceae. The flowers can be found from February to May. The stems of this plant dry-out when the seeds are ripe and break free from the underground root, and are then blown away like a tumbleweed, thus spreading the seeds effectively over large areas with little standing vegetation.

The main species in this genus (Gundelia tournefortii) is native to the eastern Mediterranean and the Middle-East. Opinions differ about the number of species in Gundelia. Sometimes the genus is regarded monotypic, G. tournefortii being a species with a large variability, but other authors distinguish up to nine species, differing in floret color and pubescence. Young stems are cooked and eaten in the Middle-East and are said to taste like a combination of artichoke and asparagus.

== Description ==
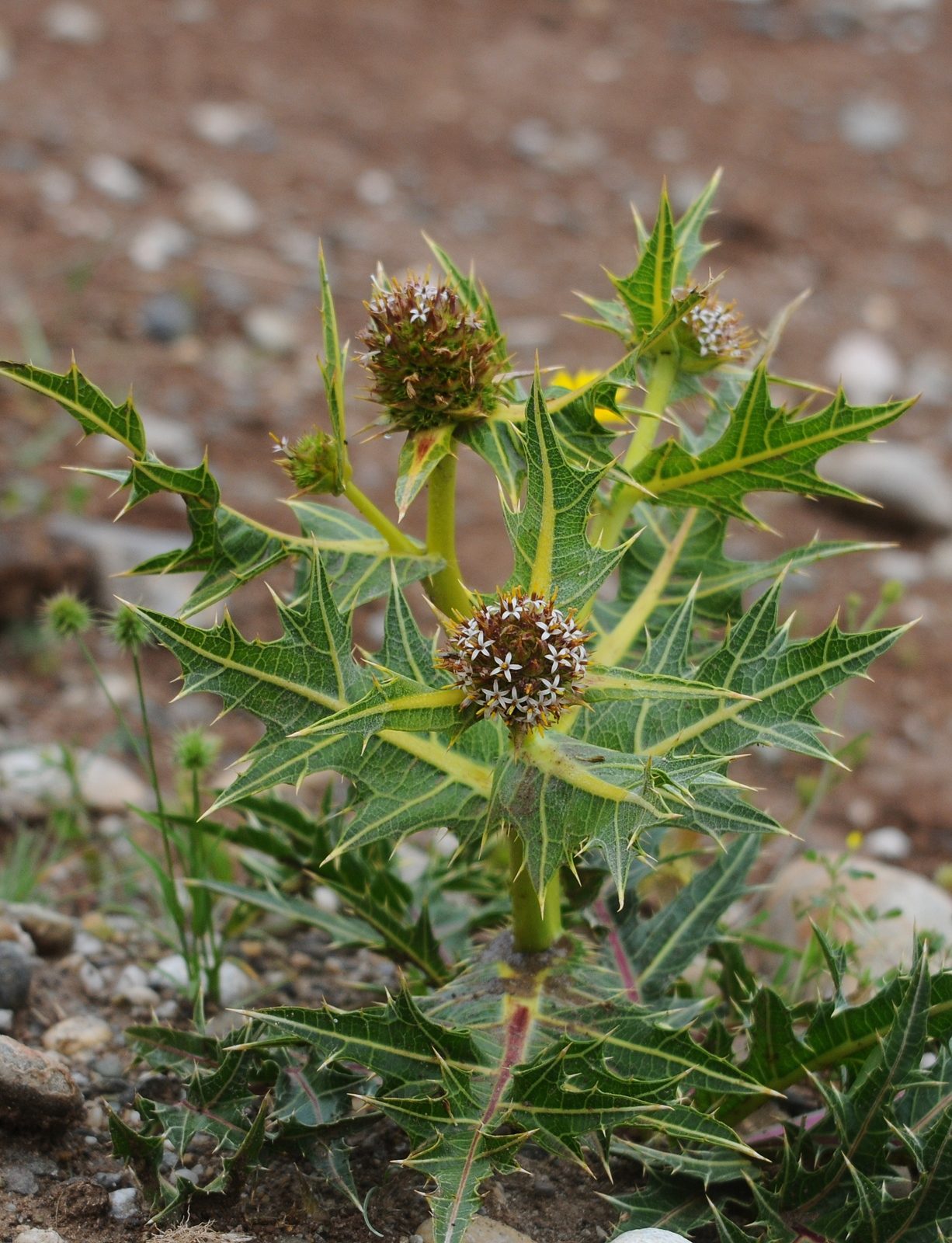
Small plant in flower

Gundelia tournefortii is a spiny hemicryptophyte with stems 20–100 centimetres or 8–39 1/2 inches that branch from the base. The first growth of the plant consists of a rosette of leaves. All parts contain a milky latex. The parts above the surface break from the root and may be blown away by the wind as a tumbleweed, assisting in the dispersion of the seed. All counts executed so far arrive at eighteen chromosomes (2n=18).

=== Root, stems and leaves ===
The plant develops a woody, vertical rootstock of up to 4 cm in diameter, at the surface usually covered by the remains of old leaves. The leaves are sessile or decurrent at their base with spiny wings, and alternate set along the stems. The lowest leaves are usually 7–30 cm long and 4–16 cm wide, pinnately dissected and the sections of the larger leaves may be pinnately parted themselves, and have a dentate or serrate margin, all tipped with spines. The midvein and sideveins are prominent, whitish, sometimes tinged purple. The leaf surface may be covered in spiderweb-like hairs, that tend to wither away quickly.

=== Inflorescence ===
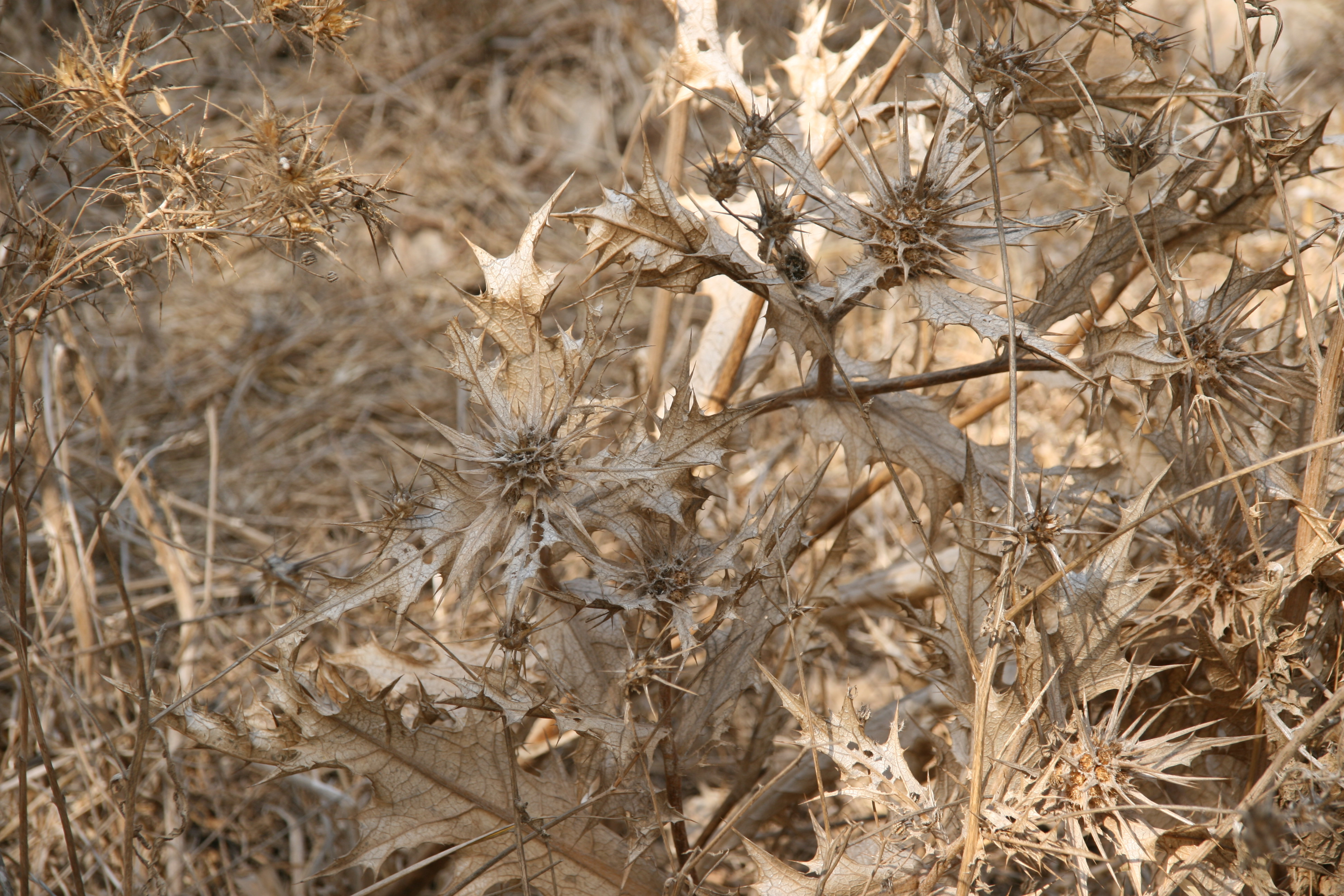
Tumbleweed stage

The stem divides into ten or more branches, each of which is topped by a compound spiny ovoid inflorescence of 4–8 cm in diameter, which may be covered in dense arachnoid hairs. This inflorescence is unusual for members of the family Asteraceae, as each true flower head is so far reduced as to only contain one floret, which is surrounded by its own involucre. Five to seven of these monofloral flower heads combine into secondary flower heads, each subtended by a spiny bract hardly or substantially longer than the secondary flower heads, with only the centre floret developing a cypsela, and the surrounding ones only producing pollen. These secondary flower heads later break free from the globose assembly of flower heads that sit on the end of each branch of the stem during the tumbleweed-stage. Remarkable for a member of the tribe Cichorieae are also the disk florets, a trait that is further only present in Warionia saharae.

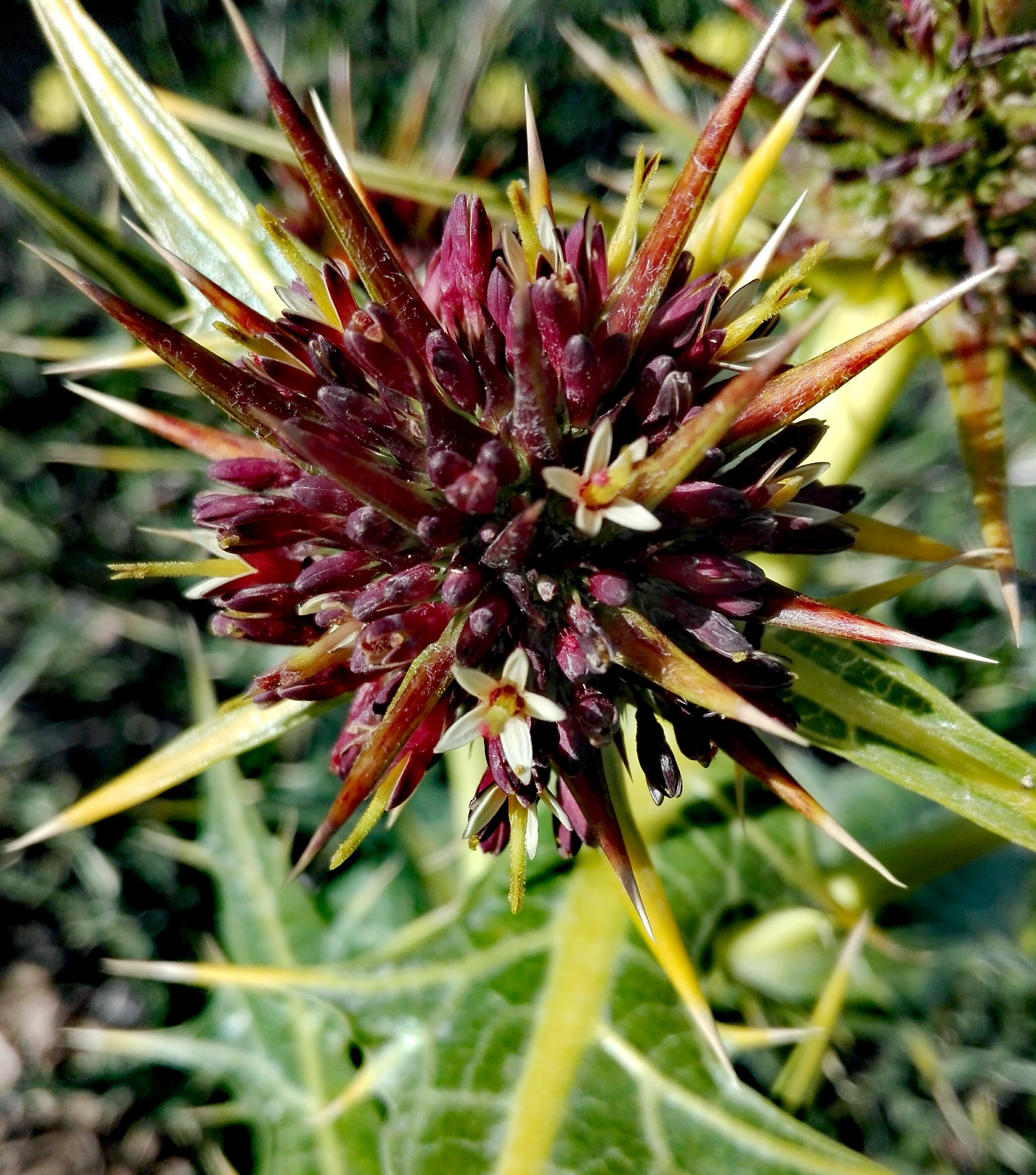
Inflorescence

The pentameric corollas are usually 7–10 mm long, gloomy purple or yellowish outside, white to bright yellow, greenish, flesh colored or silvery to red purple inside, with spreading narrow lobes of 3–4 mm mm long and about 1 mm wide, the tube hairless inside. The five merged anthers form a cylinder of 4–6 mm long, yellow or brownish in color. The style arms are also brownish.

Pollen is covered in acute spines.

=== Fruit and seed ===
The involucral bracts of the secondary flower heads are merged into a brown, durable, hard cup with a fibery fringe. Each contains only one cypsela of about 8 mm long, 5 mm at its widest, somewhat dorsally compressed, narrow at its base and widest beyond halflength, with the pappus at its tip consisting of a 2 mm high cup, narrowest at its base.

=== Characters common to all Asteraceae ===
Like in all Asteraceae, the pentameric flowers have anthers that are fused together forming a tube through which the style grows. The style picks up the pollen on hairs along its length and splits into two style branches at its tip. These parts sit on an inferior ovary that grows into an indehiscent fruit in which only one seed develops (a so-called cypsela). All florets (in this case only one) are set on a common base (the receptacle), and are surrounded by several rows of bracts, that form an involucre. A particular character of Gudelia that is rare among the Asteraceae is that florets are gender specialised, with the central floret being functionally hermaphrodite and the marginal florets being functionally male.

=== Characters common to Cichorieae ===
Tumble thistles are assigned to the Cichorieae-tribe that shares anastomosing latex canals in both root, stem and leaves, and has flower heads only consisting of one type of floret. In Warionia and Gundelia these are exclusively disk florets, while all other Cichorieae only have ligulate florets. Gundelia is unique in the complex morphology of the inflorescences.

=== Differences with other genera ===
Warionia and Gundelia share a thistle-like appearance, anastomosing latex-ducts, floral heads that only contain disk florets, spurred anthers, and styles with branches and highest part of the scape covered with long hairs. Gundelia however is herbaceous, has monofloral primary flower heads combined into groups of five to seven, the centre floret hermaphrodite, the marginal florets functionally male, and those groups combined in ovoid spiny florescences at the end of the stem, and spiny leaves, florets dull yellow to dull purple on the inside, purple to rusty on the outside. Warionia is a shrub, has many dandelion-yellow florets in each flower head, single or with two or three together at the end of the branches, the leaves dentate but not spiny.

Scolymus is also a thistle-like herbaceaceous perennial with anastomosing latex-ducts, related to Gundelia, but it has many yellow, orange or white ligulate florets in each flower head, which are arranged with many in a spike-like inflorescence, or with a few at the end of the stems.

=== Phytochemistry ===
Gundelia contains several essential oils, with large proportions (20–25% each) of thymol and germacrene-D.

== Taxonomy ==
=== Taxonomic history ===
As far as known, the tumble thistle was first collected during an expedition by Leonhard Rauwolf (1573–1575), and this specimen can now be found in the National Herbarium in Leiden, the Netherlands. Tournefort, Von Gundelsheimer and Claude Aubriet also collected this plant while traveling through Greece, Turkey, former Armenia and Persia (1700–1702). Since Von Gundelsheimer was the first to have sighted the plant, his companions began to call it Gundelia. Tournefort already observed the remarkable morphology of the compounded flower heads. Carl Linnaeus in 1753 adopted and published this name, providing the correct name. Henri Cassini in 1821 suggested to assign this species to the tribe Vernonieae. In 1828 he specified this assignment to the Vernonieae-Rolandreae, a group formalized by Christian Friedrich Lessing as subtribe Rolandrinae in 1831. Following a change in the interpretation of the complex inflorescence, Cassini rejected the interpretation by Linnaeus, and erected the genus Gundelsheimera, which is illegitimate as it is based on the same type specimen. Next, George Bentham and Joseph Dalton Hooker in 1873 placed the species in the tribe Arctotideae, subtribe Gundelieae (corrected name Gundelinae). Pierre Edmond Boissier in 1875 thought this taxon sufficiently divergent to erect the tribe Gundelieae. Karl August Otto Hoffmann misspelled the genus name as Grundelia, while remarking that Gundelsheimera is a synonym. Other authors hesitantly considered a position for Gundelia in the Cardueae sensu lato. It recently has also been combined with Warionia in the tribe Gundelieae by C. Jeffrey.

=== Number of species ===
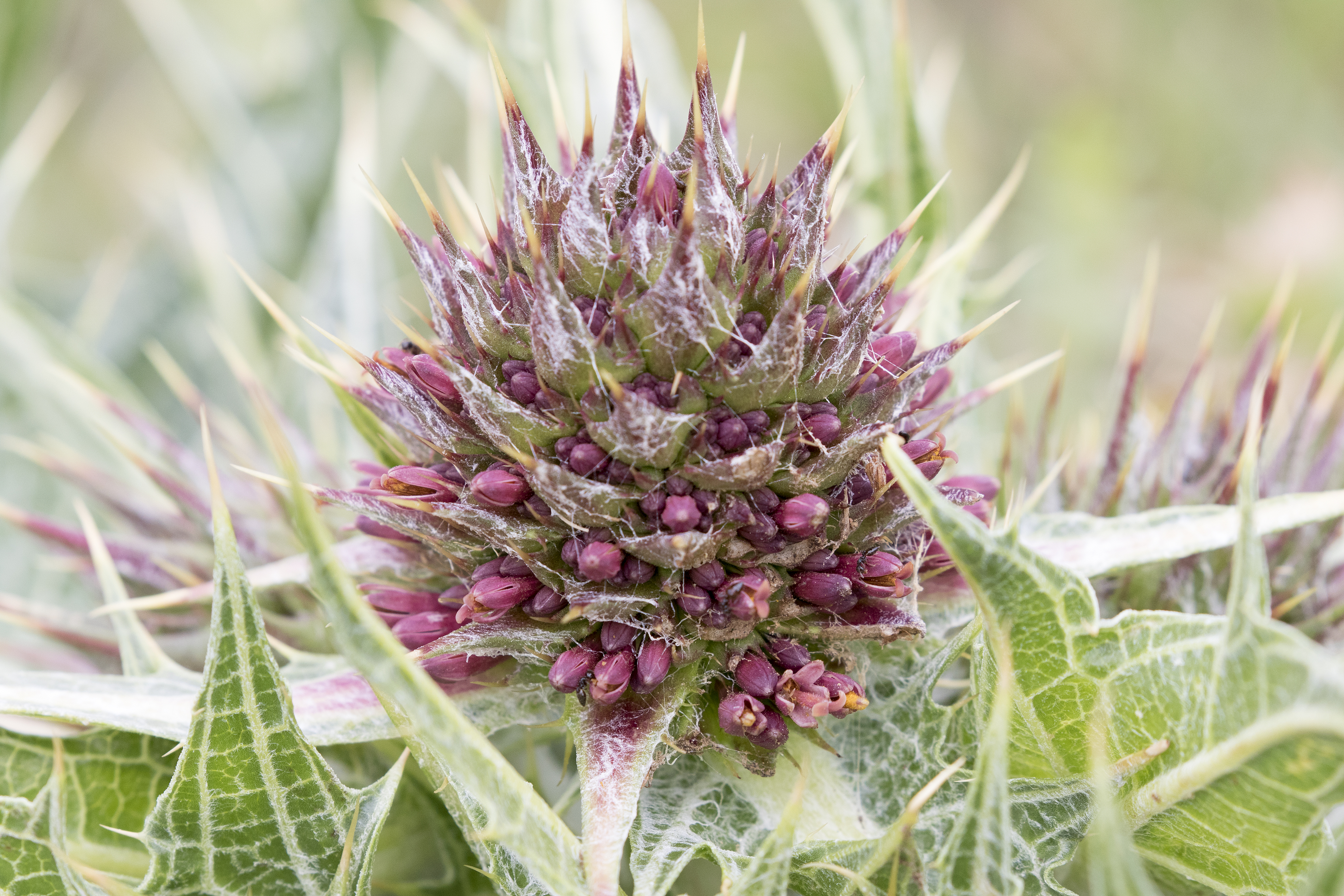
A plant with purple corollas

The earliest descriptions of Gundelia recognise that the corollas could be cream, flesh coloured or purplish. Linnaeus regarded the genus as monospecific, but distinguished plants with purple corollas as variety β. Bornmüller in 1939 distinguished a forma purpurascens. Other infraspecific taxa differ only in leaf characters. Many modern authors recognise only Gundelia tournefortii with a wide variation in corolla color, or both G. tournefortii and a much more uniform G. aragatsi Nersesyan with brown red corollas and very downy inflorescences. Other species distinguished by some authors are G. armeniaca Nersesyan, G. dersim Vitek, Yüce & Ergin, G. glabra Vitek, Yüce & Ergin and G. munzuriensis Vitek, Yüce & Ergin, G. rosea Al-Taey & Hossain, G. tenuisecta Vitek, Yüce & Ergin and Gundelia vitekii Armağan.

=== Modern classification ===
Debate on the number of subtaxa remains and some authors think there is only one species, Gundelia tournefortii. Others also recognise G. aragatsi, a form only known from Armenia, that has brown red corollas and very felty inflorescences. Some even distinguish up to nine different taxa. Gundelia is now assigned to the Cichorieae-tribe, as the basal member of the Scolyminae-subtribe.

=== Phylogeny ===
According to recent genetic analyses, the genus Gundelia is related to the genera Hymenonema, Scolymus and Catananche. This results in the following relationship tree.

- subtribe Scolyminae
  - Gundelia
  - - Catananche
    - - Hymenonema
      - Scolymus

=== Etymology ===
Pedanius Dioscorides called this plant silybum. The genus Gundelia is named to honor Andreas von Gundelsheimer (1668–1715), a German botanist, while the species name tournefortii was named after Joseph Pitton de Tournefort, a French botanist, who together undertook a botanical journey to the Levant, during which the species was collected, described and illustrated.

== Distribution ==
Gundelia tournefortii is mostly found in the Eastern Anatolia region of Turkey and in the province of Muş. In autumn, the dried yellow layers of the plant cover all the mountains, so much so that the degree that can be seen even from space. The tumble thistle can be found in Cyprus, Turkey (Anatolia), Armenia, Azerbaijan, Northern Iraq, northern Iran, Israel, Afghanistan, western Syria, Turkmenistan, Kazakhstan, Uzbekistan, Palestine, Lebanon, Jordan, and Egypt. It has been introduced in Algeria.

== Ecology ==
Gundelia grows on limestone, igneous rock or reddish soils, in steppe, open oak or pine woodland, or between coppices, as weed in barley- or cornfields, fallowed or deserted fields, and in roadsides. It can be found at altitudes up to 2500 m. It is pollinated by insects such as honey bees and pollen feeding beetles, such as the garden chafer.

== Cultivation ==
Seeds germinate slowly and may take several years. Seedlings can be planted outside but required light, well-drained soil, and protection against frost. Growth is slow during the first year. Plants can be grown in the rock garden, or on raised beds. Gundelia is probably hardy to about −15 °C when the drainage is good. Plants have been grown intermittently at the École de Botanique and in what is currently known as the Jardin des Plantes, Paris, since the 18th century.

== Uses ==
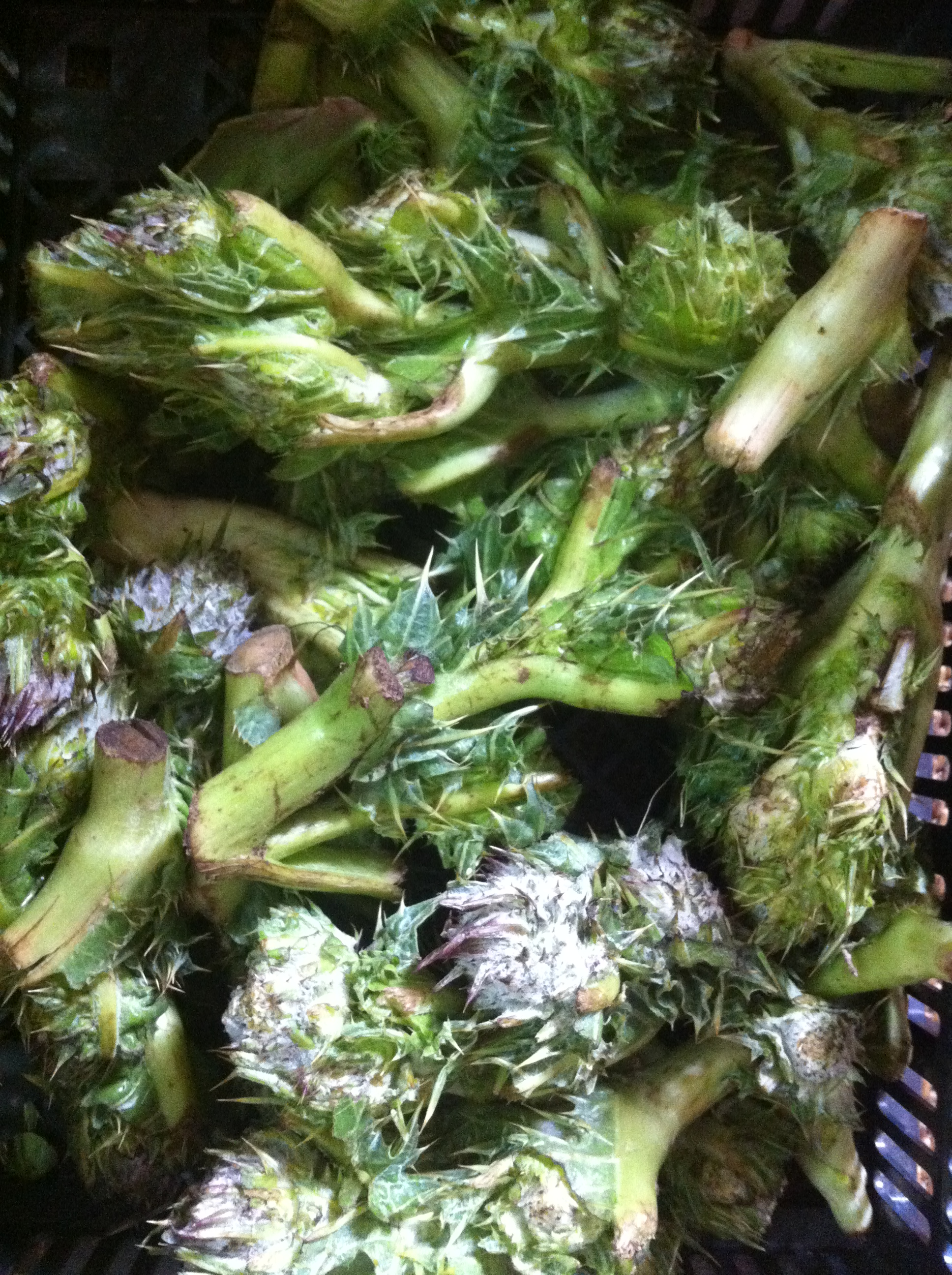
Young Gundelia-stems prepared for using as food

=== Food ===
Early in the year, Gundelia plants growing in the wild are cut at the base and the thorns are removed. The leaves, stems, roots, and particularly the undeveloped flower heads can be eaten. The base of the young leaves which is still under the surface is used by Bedouin and Arabs to make akkub soup. In Israel the plant is protected and in danger of extinction, harvesting it in nature reserves is strictly prohibited and allowed under restrictions for private use only outside them; young flower heads, stems and leaves are collected between March and May, and are then fried in olive oil, mixed with a stew of meat chops until well done, and served mixed with yogurt. Gundelia is said to taste like something between asparagus and artichoke. Another dish is to put a trimmed inflorescence in a meatball, fry these in olive oil and then simmer them in a sauce containing lemon juice. In the mountainous area in south Kurdistan (Iraqi Kurdistan), Gundelia is still being used as a vegetable, but in Israel where it is numbered among the few, wild edible plants, collecting for the market resulted in a decline in the plant population and collecting is restricted to personal use by Law. In Syria, akkoub is traditionally baked into pies.

A chewing gum can be made from the latex, a fact that is already mentioned by Tournefort in 1718, and is called "kenger sakızı" in Turkish. The fruits as well as roots can be roasted and ground to be used as substitute coffee, and is known as "kenger kahvesi". In recent times, mature seeds have been used to extract oil. Remains of charred inflorescences of Gundelia from the Neolithic found in Turkey and Iraq indicate that oil was pressed from the seeds at least 10,000 years ago. The seeds are edible (called سِسّي "Sissi" in Iraq); dried, salted and roasted are sold in nut shops, they taste similar to sun flower seeds.

The cypselas contain almost 7% oleic acid and 12½% linoleic acid, making the oil comparable to soybean, corn, sunflower and sesame oils. Commercial use would be dependent on plant breeding to improve crop yield, suitability for harvesting and for food processing, such as selection of spineless plants.

=== Traditional uses ===
Traditionally, Gundelia is used to treat a wide variety of ailments such as liver diseases, diabetes, chest pain, heart attacks, pain in the chest and the stomach, leukoderma, diarrhea and bronchitis.

=== Fodder ===
Fully grown foliage is used to feed livestock in spite of the spines, both fresh (in Syria and Palestine) and dry (in Kurdistan and Iran).

== Culture ==
Some Bible scholars think that the tumbleweed that is spoken of in Psalm 83, verse 14 "Make them like tumbleweed, O my God, like galgal before the wind" is Gundelia. Akkub, the biblical name for this species, is already mentioned in the Babylonian Talmud.

On the 21st century, Some Palestinian Arabs consider the foraging of Akoub to be part of their cultural heritage. The plant is continually foraged despite a ban on harvesting the plant in the wilderness by authorities, punishable by arrests or fines; the Israel Nature and Parks Authority states that the ban is part of a wildlife conservation effort.

Later, the ban was eased to allow foraging for personal use. Despite the plant itself not being classified as threatened, its presence in the wild is threatened by several factors, including land clearance and overexploitation.

In the kitchens of Jews from Tiberias and Safed, some preserve the custom of using akov, including by skewering meatballs on its pointed, fleshy stems and adding it to fish dishes from the Sea of Galilee.
