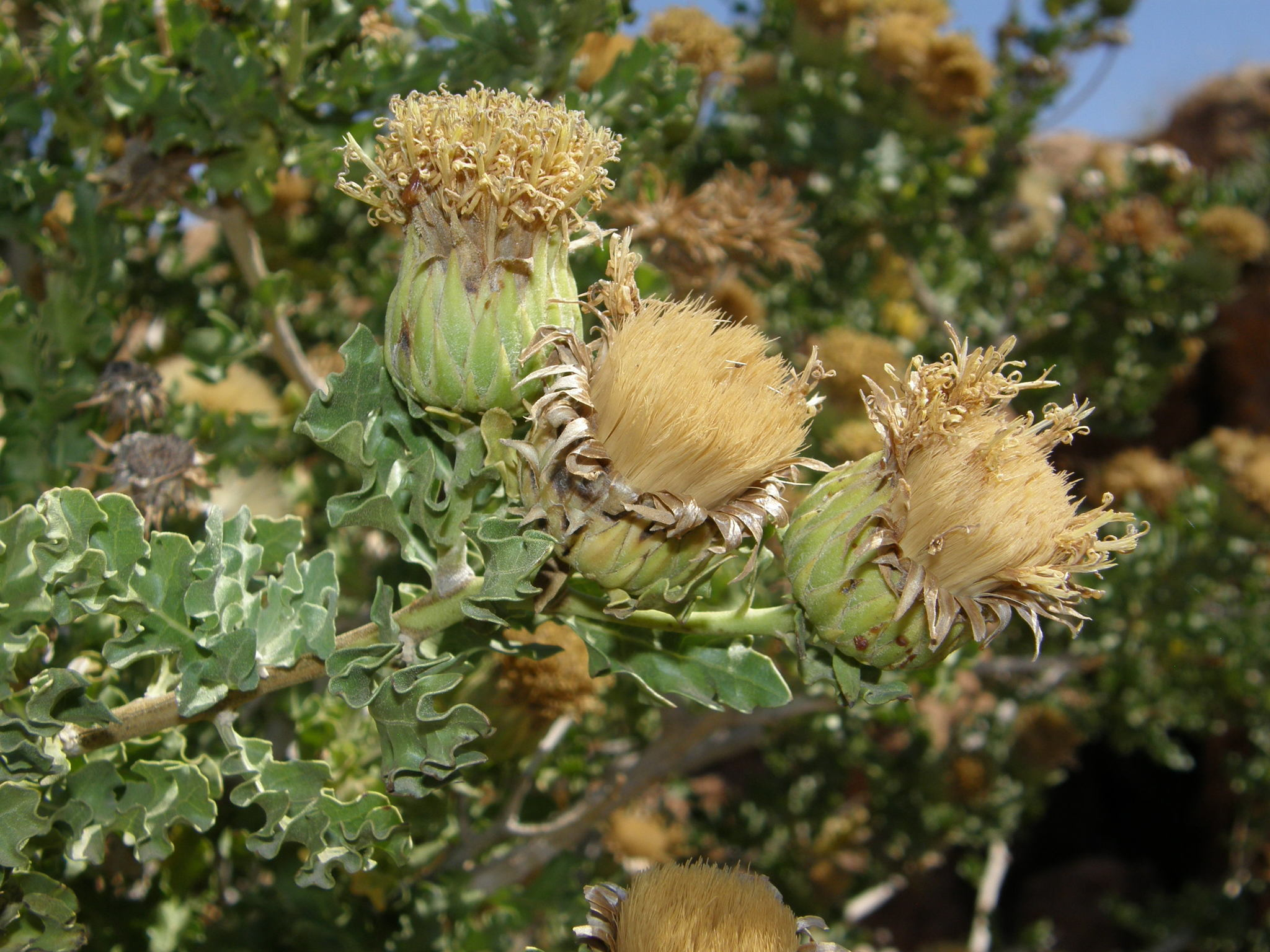

Scientific classification
- Kingdom: Plantae
- Clade: Tracheophytes
- Clade: Angiosperms
- Clade: Eudicots
- Clade: Asterids
- Order: Asterales
- Family: Asteraceae
- Subfamily: Cichorioideae
- Tribe: Cichorieae
- Subtribe: Warioniinae; Gemeinholzer & N.Kilian
- Genus: Warionia; Benth. & Coss.
- Species: W. saharae

Binomial name
- Warionia saharae Benth. & Coss.

= Warionia =

Genus of flowering plants

Warionia is a genus in the tribe Cichorieae within the family Asteraceae. The only known species is Warionia saharae, an endemic of Algeria and Morocco, and it is locally known in the Berber language as afessas, abessas or tazart n-îfiss. It is an aromatic, thistle-like shrub of ½–2 m high, that contains a white latex, and has fleshy, pinnately divided, wavy leaves. It is not thorny or prickly. The aggregate flower heads contain yellow disk florets. It flowers from April till June. Because Warionia is deviant in many respects from any other Asteraceae, different scholars have placed it hesitantly in the Cardueae, Gundelieae, Mutisieae, but now genetic analysis positions it as the sister group to all other Cichorieae.

== Description ==
Wariona is an aromatic shrub, usually between ½–2 m, occasionally only 15 cm or up to 3 m high, that has a network of latex-carrying canals throughout the plant with sticky, white, milky latex. It also has oil canals. It carries glandular hairs that consist of two parallel series of a few cells on top of each other (or biserial). It has thirty-four chromosomes (2n = 34).

=== Root, stem and leaf ===
Warionia saharae has a light brown taproot, reminiscent of a parsnip. The youngest plants consist above ground of a rosette of oblanceolate, dentate leaves. Older plants develop stems, which are initially green but eventually become woody and develop a corky, grey bark. With about 75 μm, the diameter of the wood vessels is at the high end of the range within the Asteraceae. Wood fibers are relatively thick-walled. The wavy, somewhat fleshy leaves are set alternating along the stems, 2–13 cm long and 1–3 cm wide, oblong to oblanceolate. They are sinuate to pinnately partite, while the main vein in each lobe extends into an acute tip. The leaf is pinnately veined. While the leaf blade narrows at the foot, it still extends to the stem. The leaf surface is softly hairy with glandular hairs particularly near the edge.

=== Inflorescence ===
The erect flowerheads stand individually at the tip of the stems or with two or three together. Each is 3–4 cm long, 4½–6 cm wide, and contains disk florets only. The common base of the florets (or receptacle) is flat with indents where the florets are implanted, while scales and hairs are absent. The bell-shaped involucre consists of four to five rows of green bracts, sometimes tinged purple at the stretched tip and with a papery irregularly fine dentate edge. The bracts in the outer row are 6–7 mm long and 1½–2 mm wide, while bracts in rows further up are increasingly long, eventually reaching 21–23 mm. Each head carries twenty five to forty florets.

=== Florets ===
Each individual floret is bisexual, with a yellow, star-symmetric corolla of 22–25 mm long, consisting of a narrow, straight or S-shaped tube of 10–11 mm long, which abruptly widens into a deeply 5-lobed bell, the twisting lobes being 7–8 mm long, softly haired, with twin hairs and glandular hairs consisting of two piles of a few cells, while the tip is adorned with a tuft of hairs. Like in all asteraceae the five anthers are fused into a tube, through which the style grows, picking up the pollen on hairs along its length. The anthers in Warionia are yellow, 11–12 mm long, their base reaching 1½–2 mm below the attachment to the yellow hearless filaments, and the acute tips reaches 2 mm above the merged tube. The pollen grains are large, approximately globular, tricolpate, carrying spines and with perforations between the spines. The yellow style, has a widened base carrying a nectary, grows to eventually 24–26 mm long, and splits in its female phase at the tip into two 4–6 mm long branches. The inner surface of the style branches is completely covered papillae, while the outer surface has hairs extending somewhat below the branches.

=== Fruit ===
The fruit below the corolla (called cypsela) is 4½–5 mm long, 1½–3 mm wide, narrowed at the tip, where it carries a collar, with a shaggy appearance due to white hairs. Like in all Asteraceae the calyx has changed and is called pappus. In this case it consists of two circles of rigid, white-yellowish, somewhat papery bristles, that carry small teeth at regular distances along their length, mostly 15–18 mm long, but some of the outer bristles only 2½ mm long.

=== Phytochemistry ===
The plants produce a pungent smell when touched, due to the aromatic oil, which contains 42–53% β-eudesmol, 17½% trans-nerolidol, 5–8½% linalool and about 2½% guaiol. The essential oil content is approximately 1% of the weight of the dried leaves. When damaged, the plants ooze a very sticky white latex, which, like in the other Cichorioideae, has a high triterpene content.

== Taxonomy ==
Jean Pierre Adrien Warion collected specimens in 1865 and 1866, south-west of the Algerian coastal mountain range. These were named Warionia saharae and described by George Bentham and Ernest Cosson, in the Bulletin of the Société botanique de France in 1872. There are no synonyms. The species was initially assigned to the Cardueae. In the 1970s, scholars thought it better placed in the Mutisieae sensu lato. In 1991 however, Hansen, who made a thorough morphological analysis of the Mutisieae sensu lato, suggested Warionia would be closer related to the Cardueae due to its spiny pollen, the bell-shape of the florets and the stiff hairs on the style.

=== Phylogeny ===
Recent genetic analysis identifies the species as the sister of all other Cichorieae, in its own subtribe Warioniinae. The following tree represents the relationships between Warionia and its relatives.

- tribe Cichorieae
  - - - all other subtribes of the Cichorieae
      - subtribe Scolyminae
    - subtribe Scorzonerinae
  - subtribe Warioniinae
    Warionia saharae

=== Etymology ===
The genus name Warionia is named in honor of Adrien Warion (1837–1880), a French military physician and botanist who made extensive collections while stationed in North Africa. The specific epithet saharae refers to the Sahara desert, in a small part of which this plant naturally occurs.

== Distribution and ecology ==
Warionia saharae is an endemic of Morocco between Tamanar, Ifni, Erfoud and Figuig, and of Algeria, in the Naâma Province and the Béni Ounif District. It grows on slopes of the High Atlas, Anti-Atlas and Saharian Atlas, along the coast of southern Morocco, and in the desert, on mafic and siliceous rock, at altitudes between sea level and 1300 m. At Ifni it was found growing together with Euphorbia echinus, E. obtusifolia and Senecio anteuphorbium. The species loses its leaves when seasonal water availability drops below a threshold in summer, but in cultivation it keeps its leaves as long as it is watered adequately. In the wild it occurs to be pest-free, except for browsing goats which can have a detrimental impact on it. Pollen matures before the styles are fertile and this makes the species dependent on cross-pollination. As individuals usually appear distant from each other and pollinating insects may be scarce, seed fertility may be low.

== Cultivation ==
The species can be grown from seed in free draining compost at 30 °C by day and 15 °C at night. It may grow to 1½ m in its first year, at which stage the stems become woody. In cultivation, whitefly may be a problem and when it is damp, mildew may occur on the leaves.

== Use ==
Warionia saharae is said to have healing properties due to the essential oils it contains. An infusion of the dried leaves is used against arthritis and epilepsy. Local healers use it to cure uterus infections. Local women use the plant as a perfume and "believe that the supernatural powers attributed to the plant make them more seductive".
