= List of Cerceris species =

This is a list of 880 species in Cerceris, a genus of wasps in the family Philanthidae.

== Cerceris species ==
- Cerceris abac Fritz and Mariluis, 1976^{i c g}
- Cerceris abacta Shestakov, 1915^{i c g}
- Cerceris abatanensis Reyes, 1986^{i c g}
- Cerceris abdita Kazenas, 1984^{i c g}
- Cerceris abdominalis (Fabricius, 1804)^{i c g}
- Cerceris abdominiglabra X. Li and Q. Li, 2014^{i g}
- Cerceris aborlana Tsuneki, 1992^{i c g}
- Cerceris abuensis R. Turner, 1912^{i c g}
- Cerceris acanthophila Cockerell, 1897^{i c}
- Cerceris acolhua de Saussure, 1867^{i c g}
- Cerceris acuta Radoszkowski, 1877^{i c g}
- Cerceris adae R. Turner, 1936^{i c g}
- Cerceris adelpha Kohl, 1887^{i c g}
- Cerceris aemula Arnold, 1945^{i c g}
- Cerceris aemuloides Leclercq, 1962^{i c g}
- Cerceris aequalis Provancher, 1888^{i c g}
- Cerceris aerata Kazenas, 1972^{i c g}
- Cerceris africanula Brauns, 1926^{i c g}
- Cerceris agnata R. Turner, 1912^{i c g}
- Cerceris alacris Mickel, 1918^{i c g}
- Cerceris alamos Scullen, 1972^{i c g}
- Cerceris alaope Banks, 1912^{i c g}
- Cerceris alastoroides R. Turner, 1914^{i c g}
- Cerceris albicincta Klug, 1845^{i c g}
- Cerceris albicolor Shestakov, 1918^{i c g}
- Cerceris albifrons F. Smith, 1856^{i c g}
- Cerceris albispinosa Arnold, 1952^{i c g}
- Cerceris alboatra Walker, 1871^{i c g}
- Cerceris albofasciata (Rossi, 1790)^{i c g}
- Cerceris albolineata (Cameron, 1908)^{i c g}
- Cerceris albopectoris Empey, 1973^{i c g}
- Cerceris albopicta F. Smith, 1873^{i c g}
- Cerceris alcyone Arnold, 1951^{i c g}
- Cerceris alexandrae F. Morawitz, 1889^{i c g}
- Cerceris amakosa Brauns, 1926^{i c g}
- Cerceris amamiensis Tsuneki, 1961^{i c g}
- Cerceris amathusia de Beaumont, 1958^{i c g}
- Cerceris amatoria Arnold, 1931^{i c g}
- Cerceris andalgalensis Fritz and Toro, 1969^{i c g}
- Cerceris andersoni R. Turner, 1918^{i c g}
- Cerceris andina Brèthes, 1910^{i c g}
- Cerceris andrei Gussakovskij, 1952^{i c g}
- Cerceris angelica Kazenas, 1977^{i c g}
- Cerceris angustata F. Morawitz, 1893^{i c g}
- Cerceris angustifrons Tsuneki, 1971^{i c g}
- Cerceris angustirostris Shestakov, 1918^{i c g}
- Cerceris annulata (Rossi, 1790)^{i c g}
- Cerceris annuligera Taschenberg, 1875^{i c g}
- Cerceris ansa Shestakov, 1914^{i c g}
- Cerceris antennata F. Morawitz, 1890^{i c g}
- Cerceris anthicivora Evans, 1982^{i c g}
- Cerceris antilope Tsuneki, 1971^{i c g}
- Cerceris antipodes F. Smith, 1856^{i c g}
- Cerceris apakensis Tsuneki, 1961^{i c g}
- Cerceris apix Fritz and Mariluis, 1979^{i c g}
- Cerceris aquilina F. Smith, 1856^{i c g}
- Cerceris arechavaletai Brèthes, 1909^{i c g}
- Cerceris arelate Banks, 1912^{i c g b}
- Cerceris arenaria (Linnaeus, 1758)^{i c g}
- Cerceris argentifrons Guérin-Méneville, 1844^{i c g}
- Cerceris argentina Brèthes, 1910^{i c g}
- Cerceris argentosa Shestakov, 1912^{i c g}
- Cerceris ariadne R. Turner, 1912^{i c g}
- Cerceris armata de Beaumont, 1959^{i c g}
- Cerceris armaticeps Cameron, 1910^{i c g}
- Cerceris armigera R. Turner, 1917^{i c g}
- Cerceris arnoldi Brauns, 1926^{i c g}
- Cerceris arrogans Arnold, 1931^{i c g}
- Cerceris associa Kohl, 1898^{i c g}
- Cerceris astarte Banks, 1913^{i c g}
- Cerceris astricta Reyes, 1988^{i c g}
- Cerceris aterrima Arnold, 1942^{i c g}
- Cerceris atramontensis Banks, 1913^{i c g b}
- Cerceris aurantiaca F. Smith, 1873^{i c g}
- Cerceris australis de Saussure, 1854^{i c g}
- Cerceris azteca de Saussure, 1867^{i c g}
- Cerceris bakeri Cameron, 1904^{i c g}
- Cerceris balteata Evans, 1982^{i c g}
- Cerceris baluchistanensis Cameron, 1907^{i c g}
- Cerceris banahawensis Reyes, 1986^{i c g}
- Cerceris bannisteri Empey, 1971^{i c g}
- Cerceris barchanica Kazenas, 1984^{i c g}
- Cerceris barnardi Brauns, 1926^{i c g}
- Cerceris basalis F. Smith, 1856^{i c g}
- Cerceris basimacula Cameron, 1907^{i c g}
- Cerceris beharensis Leclercq, 1967^{i c g}
- Cerceris bella Brèthes, 1910^{i c g}
- Cerceris belli R. Turner, 1912^{i c g}
- Cerceris bellona Mercet, 1914^{i c g}
- Cerceris berenice de Beaumont, 1966^{i c g}
- Cerceris betpakdalensis Kazenas, 1984^{i c g}
- Cerceris bicarinata Arnold, 1935^{i c g}
- Cerceris bicava Shestakov, 1917^{i c g}
- Cerceris bicincta Klug, 1835^{i c g}
- Cerceris bicornuta Guérin-Méneville, 1844^{i c g b}
- Cerceris bicuspidata Arnold, 1931^{i c g}
- Cerceris bidentula Maidl, 1926^{i c g}
- Cerceris bifasciata Guérin-Méneville, 1835^{i c g}
- Cerceris bifurcata Empey, 1970^{i c g}
- Cerceris bimaculata Cameron, 1905^{i c g}
- Cerceris binghami R. Turner, 1912^{i c g}
- Cerceris binodis Spinola, 1842^{i c g}
- Cerceris biplicatula Gussakovskij, 1938^{i c g}
- Cerceris bituberculata Tsuneki, 1963^{i c g}
- Cerceris blakei Cresson, 1865^{i c g}
- Cerceris boetica (Pérez, 1913)^{i c g}
- Cerceris boharti Scullen, 1965^{i c g}
- Cerceris bohartiana Fritz and Toro, 1969^{i c g}
- Cerceris bolanica R. Turner, 1912^{i c g}
- Cerceris bolingeri Scullen, 1965^{i c g}
- Cerceris bolingeriana Krombein, 1979^{i c g}
- Cerceris bonaerensis Holmberg, 1903^{i c g}
- Cerceris borealis Mocsáry, 1901^{i c g}
- Cerceris boschmai van-der Vecht, 1964^{g}
- Cerceris boschmai van der Vecht, 1964^{i c}
- Cerceris bothavillensis Brauns, 1926^{i c g}
- Cerceris bothriophora Schletterer, 1887^{i c g}
- Cerceris bougainvillensis Tsuneki, 1968^{i c g}
- Cerceris boysi R. Turner, 1912^{i c g}
- Cerceris bracteata Eversmann, 1849^{i c g}
- Cerceris bradleyi Scullen, 1972^{i c g}
- Cerceris brandti Krombein, 1969^{i c g}
- Cerceris brethesi Fritz and Mariluis, 1979^{i c g}
- Cerceris brevibarbata Tsuneki, 1976^{i c g}
- Cerceris bridwelli Scullen, 1965^{i c g}
- Cerceris bucculata A. Costa, 1860^{i c g}
- Cerceris bulawayoensis Brauns, 1926^{i c g}
- Cerceris bulganensis Tsuneki, 1971^{i c g}
- Cerceris bupresticida Dufour, 1841^{i c g}
- Cerceris butleri Scullen, 1965^{i c g}
- Cerceris cacaloapana Scullen, 1972^{i c g}
- Cerceris caelebs Giner Marí, 1942^{i c g}
- Cerceris caiman Fritz and Mariluis, 1976^{i c g}
- Cerceris calida R. Turner, 1915^{i c g}
- Cerceris californica Cresson, 1865^{i c g b}
- Cerceris callani Krombein, 1972^{i c g}
- Cerceris calochorti Rohwer, 1908^{i c g}
- Cerceris campestris Holmberg, 1903^{i c g}
- Cerceris campicola Arnold, 1942^{i c g}
- Cerceris campsomeroides Arnold, 1951^{i c g}
- Cerceris capito Lepeletier, 1845^{i c g}
- Cerceris carinalis Pérez, 1905^{i c g}
- Cerceris carrascoi Fritz and Toro, 1973^{i c g}
- Cerceris carrizonensis Banks, 1915^{i c g}
- Cerceris caura Fritz and Mariluis, 1976^{i c g}
- Cerceris cavagnaroi Scullen, 1972^{i c g}
- Cerceris ceciliapanogadiae Reyes, 1986^{i c g}
- Cerceris celebensis Maidl, 1926^{i c g}
- Cerceris cerussata Shestakov, 1918^{i c g}
- Cerceris cerverae Giner Marí, 1941^{i c g}
- Cerceris chacoana Brèthes, 1910^{i c g}
- Cerceris changi Tsuneki, 1972^{i c g}
- Cerceris cheops de Beaumont, 1951^{i c g}
- Cerceris cheskesiana Giner Marí, 1945^{i c g}
- Cerceris chilensis Spinola, 1851^{i c g}
- Cerceris chirindensis Arnold, 1932^{i c g}
- Cerceris chiriquensis Cameron, 1890^{i c g}
- Cerceris chlorotica Spinola, 1839^{i c g}
- Cerceris chromatica Schletterer, 1887^{i c g}
- Cerceris chrysothemis R. Turner, 1912^{i c g}
- Cerceris circularis (Fabricius, 1804)^{i c g}
- Cerceris circumcincta R. Turner, 1912^{i c g}
- Cerceris cisplatina Amarante, 2005^{i c g}
- Cerceris citrinella F. Smith, 1856^{i c g}
- Cerceris clarebaltazarae Reyes, 1986^{i c g}
- Cerceris clypearis de Saussure, 1887^{i c g}
- Cerceris clypeata Dahlbom, 1844^{i c g b}
- Cerceris clytia de Beaumont, 1959^{i c g}
- Cerceris cochisi Scullen, 1965^{i c g}
- Cerceris cockerelli Viereck, 1903^{i c g}
- Cerceris coelicola Giner Marí, 1942^{i c g}
- Cerceris colorata Schletterer, 1889^{i c g}
- Cerceris comberi R. Turner, 1912^{i c g}
- Cerceris compacta Cresson, 1865^{i c g}
- Cerceris compar Cresson, 1865^{i c g}
- Cerceris completa Banks, 1919^{i c g}
- Cerceris concinna Brullé, 1839^{i c g}
- Cerceris confraga Shestakov, 1914^{i c g}
- Cerceris confusa Giner Marí, 1942^{i c g}
- Cerceris conica Shestakov, 1918^{i c g}
- Cerceris conifera Krombein, 1981^{i c g}
- Cerceris conifrons Mickel, 1916^{i c g}
- Cerceris constricta Guichard, 1993^{i}
- Cerceris constrictus Guichard, 1993^{c g}
- Cerceris contigua (Villers, 1789)^{i c g}
- Cerceris convergens Viereck and Cockerell, 1904^{i c g}
- Cerceris cooperi Scullen, 1972^{i c g}
- Cerceris copiapoensis Sielfeld, 1971^{i c g}
- Cerceris cordillera V. Pérez and Toro, 1972^{i c g}
- Cerceris coreensis Tsuneki, 1961^{i c g}
- Cerceris cornigena Tsuneki, 1992^{i c g}
- Cerceris cornigera (Gmelin, 1790)^{i c g}
- Cerceris cortezi Scullen, 1972^{i c g}
- Cerceris crandalli Scullen, 1965^{i c g}
- Cerceris crenulifer Kazenas, 1974^{i c g}
- Cerceris cribrosa Spinola, 1842^{i c g}
- Cerceris cristovalensis Krombein, 1969^{i c g}
- Cerceris crotonella Viereck and Cockerell, 1904^{i c g}
- Cerceris crucis Viereck and Cockerell, 1904^{i c}
- Cerceris cucullata Bingham, 1912^{i c g}
- Cerceris cuernavaca Scullen, 1972^{i c g}
- Cerceris cuica Fritz and Mariluis, 1976^{i c g}
- Cerceris cunnamulla Evans, 1982^{i c g}
- Cerceris cupes Shestakov, 1918^{i c g}
- Cerceris curculionicida Krombein, 1981^{i c g}
- Cerceris curita Fritz and Mariluis, 1979^{i c g}
- Cerceris curo Tsuneki, 1992^{i c g}
- Cerceris curvitarsis Schletterer, 1887^{i c g}
- Cerceris cuthbertsoni Arnold, 1946^{i c g}
- Cerceris cyclops Krombein, 1969^{i c g}
- Cerceris darrensis Cockerell, 1930^{i c g}
- Cerceris decorata Brèthes, 1910^{i c g}
- Cerceris dedariensis R. Turner, 1936^{i c g}
- Cerceris dejecta Arnold, 1931^{i c g}
- Cerceris delhiensis Coumar and Dey, 2008^{i c g}
- Cerceris dentata Cameron, 1890^{i c g}
- Cerceris dentifrons Cresson, 1865^{i c g}
- Cerceris dentiventris Arnold, 1945^{i c g}
- Cerceris deserta Say, 1824^{i c g}
- Cerceris deserticola F. Morawitz, 1890^{i c g}
- Cerceris diabolica Giner Marí, 1942^{i c g}
- Cerceris diana Kazenas, 1984^{i c g}
- Cerceris difficilis Guichard, 1993^{i c g}
- Cerceris dilatata Spinola, 1842^{i c g}
- Cerceris diodonta Schletterer, 1887^{i c g}
- Cerceris dione Fritz, 1960^{i c g}
- Cerceris discrepans Brauns, 1926^{i c g}
- Cerceris dispar Dahlbom, 1845^{i c g}
- Cerceris dissecta (Fabricius, 1798)^{i c g}
- Cerceris dissona Arnold, 1955^{i c g}
- Cerceris distinguenda Shestakov, 1918^{i c g}
- Cerceris doederleini W. Schulz, 1905^{i c g}
- Cerceris dogonensis Krombein, 1974^{i c g}
- Cerceris dominicana Brauns, 1926^{i c g}
- Cerceris dondoensis Brauns, 1926^{i c g}
- Cerceris dorsalis Eversmann, 1849^{i c g}
- Cerceris dowi Tsuneki, 1968^{i c g}
- Cerceris downesivora R.Turner, 1912^{i c g}
- Cerceris dreisbachi Scullen, 1972^{i c g}
- Cerceris duchesnei Arnold, 1945^{i c g}
- Cerceris duplicata Brèthes, 1910^{i c g}
- Cerceris durango Scullen, 1972^{i c g}
- Cerceris dusmeti Giner Marí, 1941^{i c g}
- Cerceris eburneofasciata Brauns, 1926^{i c g}
- Cerceris echo Mickel, 1916^{i c g}
- Cerceris edolata Shestakov, 1912^{i c g}
- Cerceris egena Arnold, 1931^{i c g}
- Cerceris electra Arnold, 1951^{i c g}
- Cerceris elegans Evermann, 1849^{i c}
- Cerceris elizabethae Bingham, 1897^{i c g}
- Cerceris emeryana Gribodo, 1894^{i c g}
- Cerceris enodans Brèthes, 1910^{i c g}
- Cerceris ephippium R. Turner, 1912^{i c g}
- Cerceris errata Shestakov, 1918^{i c g}
- Cerceris erronea Giner Marí, 1942^{i c g}
- Cerceris eryngii Marquet, 1875^{i c g}
- Cerceris erynnis Arnold, 1931^{i c g}
- Cerceris erythrogaster Kazenas, 1972^{i c g}
- Cerceris erythropoda Cameron, 1890^{i c g}
- Cerceris erythrosoma Schletterer, 1887^{i c g}
- Cerceris erythroura Cameron, 1908^{i c g}
- Cerceris escalante Evans, 2002^{i c g}
- Cerceris escalerae Giner Marí, 1941^{i c g}
- Cerceris eucharis Schletterer, 1887^{i c g}
- Cerceris euchroma R. Turner, 1910^{i c g}
- Cerceris eulalia Brauns, 1926^{i c g}
- Cerceris eumolpicida Krombein, 1981^{i c g}
- Cerceris eungella Evans, 1982^{i c g}
- Cerceris euryanthe Kohl, 1888^{i c g}
- Cerceris evansi Scullen, 1972^{i c g}
- Cerceris eversmanni W. Schulz, 1912^{i c g}
- Cerceris exleyae Evans, 1982^{i c g}
- Cerceris expleta Brèthes, 1910^{i c g}
- Cerceris expulsa R. Turner, 1920^{i c g}
- Cerceris faceta Arnold, 1951^{i c g}
- Cerceris falcifera Tsuneki, 1961^{i c g}
- Cerceris farri Scullen, 1970^{i c g}
- Cerceris fastidiosa R. Turner, 1912^{i c g}
- Cerceris femurrubrum Viereck and Cockerell, 1904^{i c g}
- Cerceris ferocior R. Turner, 1912^{i c g}
- Cerceris ferox F. Smith, 1856^{i c g}
- Cerceris ferruginea Brèthes, 1910^{i c g}
- Cerceris ferusa Kazenas, 1979^{i c g}
- Cerceris festiva Cresson, 1865^{i c g}
- Cerceris fimbriata (Rossi, 1790)^{i c g}
- Cerceris fingo Brauns, 1926^{i c g}
- Cerceris finitima Cresson, 1865^{i c g}
- Cerceris fischeri Spinola, 1839^{i c g}
- Cerceris fitzgeraldi Empey, 1973^{i c g}
- Cerceris flavicornis Brullé, 1833^{i c g}
- Cerceris flavida Cameron, 1890^{i c g}
- Cerceris flavifrons F. Smith, 1856^{i c g}
- Cerceris flavilabris (Fabricius, 1793)^{i c g}
- Cerceris flaviventris Vander Linden, 1829^{i c g}
- Cerceris flavocostalis Cresson, 1865^{i c g}
- Cerceris flavofasciata H. Smith, 1908^{i c g}
- Cerceris flavomaculata Cameron, 1890^{c g}
- Cerceris flavonasuta Arnold, 1951^{i c g}
- Cerceris flavopicta F. Smith, 1856^{i c g}
- Cerceris flavoplagiata Cameron, 1905^{i c g}
- Cerceris flavotrochanterica Rohwer, 1912^{i c g}
- Cerceris fletcheri R. Turner, 1912^{i c g}
- Cerceris fluvialis F. Smith, 1873^{i c g}
- Cerceris fodiens Eversmann, 1849^{i c g}
- Cerceris forficata Evans, 1982^{i c g}
- Cerceris formicaria Eschscholtz, 1822^{i c g}
- Cerceris formidolosa de Saussure, 1890^{i c g}
- Cerceris formosa Dahlbom, 1845^{i c g}
- Cerceris formosana Strand, 1913^{i c g}
- Cerceris forticula Arnold, 1955^{i c g}
- Cerceris fortin Scullen, 1972^{i c g}
- Cerceris fortinata Cameron, 1902^{i c g}
- Cerceris freymuthi Radoszkowski, 1877^{i c g}
- Cerceris frigida Mocsáry, 1901^{i c g}
- Cerceris froggatti R. Turner, 1912^{i c g}
- Cerceris frontata Say, 1823^{i c g b}
- Cerceris fuliginosa F. Smith, 1856^{i c g}
- Cerceris fulva Mocsáry, 1883^{i c g}
- Cerceris fulvipes Eversmann, 1849^{i c g}
- Cerceris fulviventris Guérin-Méneville, 1844^{i c g}
- Cerceris fumipennis Say, 1837^{i c g b}
- Cerceris fumosipennis Strand, 1910^{i c g}
- Cerceris furcata F. Morawitz, 1890^{i c g}
- Cerceris furcifera Schletterer, 1887^{i c g}
- Cerceris gaetula de Beaumont, 1951^{i c g}
- Cerceris galathea de Beaumont, 1959^{i c g}
- Cerceris gallienii Arnold, 1945^{i c g}
- Cerceris gandarai Rohwer, 1912^{i c g}
- Cerceris garleppi Schrottky, 1911^{i c g}
- Cerceris gaudebunda Holmberg, 1903^{i c g}
- Cerceris gaullei Brèthes, 1920^{i c g}
- Cerceris gayi Spinola, 1851^{i c g}
- Cerceris genadentula Reyes, 1986^{i c g}
- Cerceris geneana A. Costa, 1867^{i c g}
- Cerceris gibbosa Sickman, 1894^{i c g}
- Cerceris gilberti R. Turner, 1916^{i c g}
- Cerceris gilesi R. Turner, 1910^{i c g}
- Cerceris gineri de Beaumont, 1951^{i c g}
- Cerceris globulosa (Fourcroy, 1785)^{i c}
- Cerceris gloria Reyes, 1986^{i c g}
- Cerceris gnarina Banks, 1913^{i c g}
- Cerceris goddardi Cockerell, 1930^{i c g}
- Cerceris gomphocarpi Banks, 1911^{i c g}
- Cerceris gracilis Kazenas, 1984^{i c g}
- Cerceris grana Shestakov, 1918^{i c g}
- Cerceris grandis Banks, 1913^{i c g}
- Cerceris greeni R. Turner, 1912^{i c g}
- Cerceris grisselli G. Ferguson, 1983^{i c g}
- Cerceris guigliae Giordani Soika, 1942^{i c g}
- Cerceris gusenleitneri K. Schmidt, 2000^{i c g}
- Cerceris hackeriana Cockerell, 1930^{i c g}
- Cerceris halone Banks, 1912^{i c g b}
- Cerceris hameri Guichard, 1993^{i c g}
- Cerceris hamiltoni Arnold, 1931^{i c g}
- Cerceris haramaiae Arnold, 1951^{i c g}
- Cerceris harbinensis Tsuneki, 1961^{i c g}
- Cerceris hathor Pulawski, 1983^{i c g}
- Cerceris hatuey Alayo Dalmau, 1968^{i c g}
- Cerceris hausa Arnold, 1931^{i c g}
- Cerceris herbsti Empey, 1971^{i c g}
- Cerceris hermani Fritz, 1990^{i c g}
- Cerceris hexadonta Strand, 1913^{i c g}
- Cerceris hidalgo Scullen, 1972^{i c g}
- Cerceris hilaris F. Smith, 1856^{i c g}
- Cerceris hilbrandi van-der Vecht, 1964^{g}
- Cerceris hilbrandi van der Vecht, 1964^{i c}
- Cerceris hildebrandti de Saussure, 1891^{i c g}
- Cerceris histerisnica (Spinola, 1839)^{i c g}
- Cerceris histrionica Klug, 1845^{i c g}
- Cerceris hohlbecki Shestakov, 1914^{i c g}
- Cerceris holconota Cameron, 1905^{i c g}
- Cerceris hortivaga Kohl, 1880^{i c g}
- Cerceris horus Arnold, 1931^{i c g}
- Cerceris howardevansi Genaro, 2004^{i c g}
- Cerceris huachuca Banks, 1947^{i c g}
- Cerceris hurdi Scullen, 1972^{i c g}
- Cerceris ibericella Leclercq, 1979^{i c g}
- Cerceris icta Shestakov, 1918^{i c g}
- Cerceris iliensis Kazenas, 1972^{i c g}
- Cerceris illustris Arnold, 1931^{i c g}
- Cerceris imitator F. Smith, 1856^{i c g}
- Cerceris impercepta de Beaumont, 1950^{i c g}
- Cerceris imperialis de Saussure, 1867^{i c g}
- Cerceris inara de Beaumont, 1967^{i c g}
- Cerceris inconspicua Arnold, 1931^{i c g}
- Cerceris indica (Thunberg, 1815)^{c g}
- Cerceris indicus (Thunberg, 1815)^{i}
- Cerceris inexorabilis R. Turner, 1912^{i c g}
- Cerceris inexpectata R. Turner, 1908^{i c g}
- Cerceris infumata Maidl, 1926^{i c g}
- Cerceris iniqua Kohl, 1894^{i c g}
- Cerceris insignita Arnold, 1951^{i c g}
- Cerceris insolita Cresson, 1865^{i c g b}
- Cerceris integra F. Morawitz, 1894^{i c g}
- Cerceris interrupta (Panzer, 1799)^{i c g}
- Cerceris interstincta (Fabricius, 1798)^{i c g}
- Cerceris intricata F. Smith, 1856^{i c g}
- Cerceris intrusa Krombein, 1981^{i c g}
- Cerceris invalida Kohl, 1906^{i c g}
- Cerceris invita R. Turner, 1912^{i c g}
- Cerceris irene Banks, 1912^{i c g}
- Cerceris iridis Evans, 1982^{i c g}
- Cerceris isis Arnold, 1931^{i c g}
- Cerceris isolde Banks, 1947^{i c g}
- Cerceris ivannikovi Kazenas, 1984^{i c g}
- Cerceris jakowleffi Kohl, 1898^{i c g}
- Cerceris japonica Ashmead, 1904^{i c g}
- Cerceris jashenkoi Kazenas, 2006^{i c g}
- Cerceris jatahyna Brèthes, 1920^{i c g}
- Cerceris jeiti Genaro, 2009^{i c g}
- Cerceris jucunda Cresson, 1873^{i c g}
- Cerceris kansuensis Shestakov, 1934^{i c g}
- Cerceris karimuiensis Krombein, 1969^{i c g}
- Cerceris kasachstanica Kazenas, 1972^{i c g}
- Cerceris kaszabi Tsuneki, 1971^{i c g}
- Cerceris katangae Brauns, 1914^{i c g}
- Cerceris kedahae Pagden, 1934^{i c g}
- Cerceris kennicottii Cresson, 1865^{i c g b}
- Cerceris kilimandjaroensis Cameron, 1908^{i c g}
- Cerceris kirbyi Bingham, 1897^{i c g}
- Cerceris klugii F. Smith, 1856^{i c g}
- Cerceris kobrowi Brauns, 1926^{i c g}
- Cerceris kohlii Schletterer, 1887^{i c g}
- Cerceris kokuevi Shestakov, 1912^{i c g}
- Cerceris koma Tsuneki, 1961^{i c g}
- Cerceris koryo Tsuneki, 1961^{i c g}
- Cerceris koshantshikovi Shestakov, 1914^{i c g}
- Cerceris kozlovi Shestakov, 1918^{i c g}
- Cerceris krombeini Scullen, 1965^{i c g}
- Cerceris krugi Dewitz, 1881^{i c g}
- Cerceris kumamotonis Tsuneki, 1978^{i c g}
- Cerceris kurzenkoi Kazenas, 1980^{i c g}
- Cerceris kuznetzovi Kazenas, 1984^{i c g}
- Cerceris kwangtsehiana Giner Marí, 1942^{i c g}
- Cerceris labeculata R. Turner, 1908^{i c g}
- Cerceris labiata (Olivier, 1792)^{i c g}
- Cerceris lacinia Tsuneki, 1961^{i c g}
- Cerceris laeta (Fabricius, 1793)^{i c g}
- Cerceris laevigata F. Smith, 1856^{i c g}
- Cerceris lama R. Turner, 1912^{i c g}
- Cerceris lamarquensis Fritz and Toro, 1969^{i c g}
- Cerceris lanaonis Tsuneki, 1992^{i c g}
- Cerceris languida Cameron, 1905^{i c g}
- Cerceris larissae K. Schmidt, 2000^{i c g}
- Cerceris lateridentata Arnold, 1945^{i c g}
- Cerceris laterifurcata Empey, 1973^{i c g}
- Cerceris laterimaculata Empey, 1973^{i c g}
- Cerceris lateriproducta Mochi, 1939^{i c g}
- Cerceris latibalteata Cameron, 1904^{i c g}
- Cerceris latiberbis Tsuneki, 1968^{i c g}
- Cerceris laticincta Lepeletier, 1845^{i c g}
- Cerceris latidens Cameron, 1902^{i c g}
- Cerceris latifrons Bingham, 1902^{i c g}
- Cerceris lativentris Gussakovskij, 1938^{i c g}
- Cerceris latro F. Smith, 1856^{i c g}
- Cerceris lauta Sk. Yamane and Tano, 1995^{i c g}
- Cerceris laxata Shestakov, 1918^{i c g}
- Cerceris leucochroa Schletterer, 1887^{i c g}
- Cerceris leytensis Tsuneki, 1992^{i c g}
- Cerceris listrognatha Evans, 1982^{i c g}
- Cerceris ljubae Fritz, 1990^{i c g}
- Cerceris lobaba W.F. Kirby, 1900^{i c g}
- Cerceris longilabris Arnold, 1946^{i c g}
- Cerceris longitudinalis Giordani Soika, 1942^{i c g}
- Cerceris longiuscula Arnold, 1951^{i c g}
- Cerceris luchti van-der Vecht, 1964^{g}
- Cerceris luchti van der Vecht, 1964^{i c}
- Cerceris luculenta Evans, 1982^{i c g}
- Cerceris lunata A. Costa, 1867^{i c g}
- Cerceris lunigera Dahlbom, 1845^{i c g}
- Cerceris luthpia Kazenas, 1980^{i}
- Cerceris lutphia Kazenas, 1980^{c g}
- Cerceris lutzi Scullen, 1972^{i c g}
- Cerceris luxuriosa Dahlbom, 1845^{i c g}
- Cerceris luzonensis Crawford, 1910^{i c g}
- Cerceris lynchii Brèthes, 1910^{i c g}
- Cerceris macalanga Brauns, 1926^{i c g}
- Cerceris macswaini Scullen, 1965^{i c g}
- Cerceris macula (Fabricius, 1804)^{i c g}
- Cerceris maculata Radoszkowski, 1877^{i c g}
- Cerceris maculicrus de Beaumont, 1967^{i c g}
- Cerceris manca Fritz and Mariluis, 1979^{i c g}
- Cerceris manchuriana Tsuneki, 1961^{i c g}
- Cerceris mandibularis Patton, 1881^{i c g}
- Cerceris manflava Tsuneki, 1971^{i c g}
- Cerceris manifesta Arnold, 1952^{i c g}
- Cerceris manjoni Fritz and Mariluis, 1976^{i c g}
- Cerceris maracandica Radoszkowski, 1877^{i c g}
- Cerceris margarita de Beaumont, 1966^{i c g}
- Cerceris marginata F. Smith, 1856^{i c g}
- Cerceris marginula Dalla Torre, 1897^{i c g}
- Cerceris maritima de Saussure, 1867^{i c g}
- Cerceris mariusi Fritz, 1989^{i c g}
- Cerceris martialis Giner Marí, 1942^{i c g}
- Cerceris mastogaster F. Smith, 1856^{i c g}
- Cerceris mazimba Brauns, 1926^{i c g}
- Cerceris media Klug, 1835^{i c g}
- Cerceris meditata Shestakov, 1918^{i c g}
- Cerceris megacantha Evans, 1982^{i c g}
- Cerceris megacephala Brèthes, 1913^{i c g}
- Cerceris melaina R. Turner, 1912^{i c g}
- Cerceris melanthe Banks, 1947^{i c g}
- Cerceris mellicula R. Turner, 1912^{i c g}
- Cerceris mendesensis Brèthes, 1920^{i c g}
- Cerceris mendozana Brèthes, 1913^{i c g}
- Cerceris menkei Fritz and Toro, 1969^{i c g}
- Cerceris menoni Coumar and Dey, 2003^{i c g}
- Cerceris merope Arnold, 1951^{i c g}
- Cerceris merredinensis R. Turner, 1936^{i c g}
- Cerceris mesopotamica Brèthes, 1913^{i c g}
- Cerceris metatarsalis R. Turner, 1926^{i c g}
- Cerceris mexicana de Saussure, 1867^{i c g}
- Cerceris micropunctata Shestakov, 1918^{i c g}
- Cerceris militaris Dahlbom, 1844^{i c g}
- Cerceris milkoi Kazenas, 2000^{i c g}
- Cerceris millironi Krombein, 1969^{i c g}
- Cerceris mimica Cresson, 1873^{i c g}
- Cerceris minax Mickel, 1918^{c g}
- Cerceris mindanaonis Tsuneki, 1992^{i c g}
- Cerceris minuscula R. Turner, 1910^{i c g}
- Cerceris minutior Maidl, 1924^{i c g}
- Cerceris minutissima Maidl, 1924^{i c g}
- Cerceris misoolensis Krombein, 1969^{i c g}
- Cerceris mitjaevi Kazenas, 2001^{i c g}
- Cerceris moczari Tsuneki, 1971^{i c g}
- Cerceris modica Amarante, 2002^{i c g}
- Cerceris moestissima Guiglia, 1941^{i c g}
- Cerceris moggionis Arnold, 1951^{i c g}
- Cerceris monocera Kohl, 1898^{i c g}
- Cerceris montealban Scullen, 1972^{i c g}
- Cerceris montezuma Cameron, 1890^{i c g}
- Cerceris monticola Arnold, 1931^{i c g}
- Cerceris morawitzi Mocsáry, 1883^{i c g}
- Cerceris mordax Krombein, 1969^{i c g}
- Cerceris morelos Scullen, 1972^{i c g}
- Cerceris morrae Strand, 1910^{i c g}
- Cerceris mossambica Gribodo, 1895^{i c g}
- Cerceris moyanoi Holmberg, 1903^{i c g}
- Cerceris multiguttata R. Turner, 1908^{i c g}
- Cerceris multipicta F. Smith, 1873^{i c g}
- Cerceris nana Shestakov, 1918^{i c g}
- Cerceris narcisoi Fritz, 1983^{i c g}
- Cerceris nargisa Kazenas, 1984^{i c g}
- Cerceris nasidens Schletterer, 1887^{i c g}
- Cerceris natalensis de Saussure, 1867^{i c g}
- Cerceris neahminax Scullen, 1965^{i c g}
- Cerceris nebrascensis H. Smith, 1908^{i c g}
- Cerceris nebulosa Cameron, 1890^{i c g}
- Cerceris neghelliensis Guiglia, 1939^{i c g}
- Cerceris nenicra de Saussure, 1887^{i c g}
- Cerceris nenitroidea Bischoff, 1913^{i c g}
- Cerceris neogenita W. Schulz, 1906^{i c g}
- Cerceris nephthys Arnold, 1931^{i c g}
- Cerceris nigra Ashmead, 1900^{i c g}
- Cerceris nigrescens F. Smith, 1856^{i c g b}
- Cerceris nigriceps F. Smith, 1873^{i c g}
- Cerceris nigrosa Fritz, 1989^{i c g}
- Cerceris nigrostoma Brauns, 1926^{i c g}
- Cerceris nikolaji Kazenas, 1980^{i c g}
- Cerceris nipponensis Tsuneki, 1961^{i c g}
- Cerceris nitidoides G. Ferguson, 1984^{i c g}
- Cerceris nitrariae Morice, 1911^{i c g}
- Cerceris nortina Fritz and Toro, 1969^{i c g}
- Cerceris nugax Arnold, 1931^{i c g}
- Cerceris oaxaca Scullen, 1972^{i c g}
- Cerceris obo Tsuneki, 1971^{i c g}
- Cerceris obregon Scullen, 1972^{i c g}
- Cerceris obscura Schletterer, 1887^{i c g}
- Cerceris obsoleta Cameron, 1890^{i c g}
- Cerceris occipitomaculata Packard, 1866^{i c g}
- Cerceris oceania de Beaumont, 1951^{i c g}
- Cerceris odontophora Schletterer, 1887^{i c g}
- Cerceris okumurai Tsuneki, 1968^{i c g}
- Cerceris opposita F. Smith, 1873^{i c g}
- Cerceris orangiae Brauns, 1926^{i c g}
- Cerceris oraniensis Brauns, 1926^{i c g}
- Cerceris orientalis F. Smith, 1856^{i c g}
- Cerceris osculata Evans, 1982^{i c g}
- Cerceris osiris Arnold, 1931^{i c g}
- Cerceris otomia de Saussure, 1867^{i c g}
- Cerceris palawanensis Tsuneki, 1976^{i c g}
- Cerceris paleata de Saussure, 1891^{i c g}
- Cerceris pallidula Morice, 1897^{i c g}
- Cerceris palmetorum de Beaumont, 1951^{i c g}
- Cerceris panama Scullen, 1972^{i c g}
- Cerceris papuensis Krombein, 1969^{i c g}
- Cerceris paratristis Coumar and Dey, 2003^{i c g}
- Cerceris paulista Fritz, 1983^{i c g}
- Cerceris paupercula Holmberg, 1903^{i c g}
- Cerceris pava Kazenas, 1984^{i c g}
- Cerceris pearstonensis Cameron, 1905^{i c g}
- Cerceris pectinata Shestakov, 1918^{i c g}
- Cerceris pedetes Kohl, 1887^{i c g}
- Cerceris pekingensis Tsuneki, 1961^{i c g}
- Cerceris penai Fritz and Toro, 1969^{i c g}
- Cerceris pentadonta Cameron, 1890^{i c g}
- Cerceris perboscii Guérin-Méneville, 1844^{i c g}
- Cerceris perfida de Saussure, 1890^{i c g}
- Cerceris perkinsi R. Turner, 1910^{i c g}
- Cerceris perspicua Holmberg, 1903^{i c g}
- Cerceris petiolata de Saussure, 1891^{i c g}
- Cerceris pharaonum Kohl, 1898^{i c g}
- Cerceris pharetrigera Shestakov, 1923^{i c g}
- Cerceris picta Dahlbom, 1844^{i c g}
- Cerceris pictifacies Brauns, 1926^{i c g}
- Cerceris pictiventris Dahlbom, 1845^{i c g}
- Cerceris picturata Taschenberg, 1875^{i c g}
- Cerceris placida Arnold, 1931^{i c g}
- Cerceris placita Arnold, 1931^{i c g}
- Cerceris pleurispina de Beaumont, 1959^{i c g}
- Cerceris podagrosa Kohl, 1906^{i c g}
- Cerceris pollens Schletterer, 1887^{i c g}
- Cerceris polybioides Pendlebury, 1927^{i c g}
- Cerceris ponderosa Brèthes, 1920^{i c g}
- Cerceris potanini Shestakov, 1918^{i c g}
- Cerceris povolnyi de Beaumont, 1970^{i c g}
- Cerceris praedura R. Turner, 1908^{i c g}
- Cerceris priesneri Mochi, 1939^{i c g}
- Cerceris proboscidea Holmberg, 1903^{i c g}
- Cerceris prominens Banks, 1912^{i c g}
- Cerceris protea R. Turner, 1912^{i c g}
- Cerceris proteles Brauns, 1926^{i c g}
- Cerceris pruinosa Morice, 1897^{i c g}
- Cerceris przewalskii Shestakov, 1918^{i c g}
- Cerceris psamathe Banks, 1912^{i c g}
- Cerceris pseudoerythrocephala von Schulthess, 1926^{i c g}
- Cerceris pseudoflavescens Shestakov, 1926^{i c g}
- Cerceris pseudotridentata Maidl, 1926^{i c g}
- Cerceris pucilii Radoszkowski, 1869^{i c g}
- Cerceris pulchella Klug, 1845^{i c g}
- Cerceris pulchra Cameron, 1890^{i c g}
- Cerceris pygmaea de Saussure, 1867^{i c g}
- Cerceris quadricincta (Panzer, 1799)^{i c g}
- Cerceris quadricolor F. Morawitz, 1889^{i c g}
- Cerceris quadricornis Gussakovskij, 1938^{i c g}
- Cerceris quadridentata Arnold, 1931^{i g}
- Cerceris quadrifasciata (Panzer, 1799)^{i c g}
- Cerceris queretaro Scullen, 1972^{i c g}
- Cerceris querula Kohl, 1906^{i c g}
- Cerceris quettaensis Cameron, 1907^{i c g}
- Cerceris quinquefasciata (Rossi, 1792)^{i c g}
- Cerceris radjamandalae van-der Vecht, 1964^{g}
- Cerceris radjamandalae van der Vecht, 1964^{i c}
- Cerceris raptor F. Smith, 1856^{i c g}
- Cerceris rasoherinae Arnold, 1945^{i c g}
- Cerceris raymenti R. Turner, 1936^{i c g}
- Cerceris reginula Brauns, 1926^{i c g}
- Cerceris reicula Krombein, 1969^{i c g}
- Cerceris rejecta R. Turner, 1917^{i c g}
- Cerceris renominata R. Turner, 1917^{i c g}
- Cerceris repraesentans R. Turner, 1919^{i c g}
- Cerceris reversa F. Smith, 1873^{i c g}
- Cerceris rhinoceros Kohl, 1888^{i c g}
- Cerceris rhodesiae Brauns, 1926^{i c g}
- Cerceris rhodesiensis Empey, 1971^{i c g}
- Cerceris rhois Rohwer, 1908^{i c g}
- Cerceris rigida F. Smith, 1856^{i c g}
- Cerceris rixosa F. Smith, 1856^{i c g}
- Cerceris rohweri G. Ferguson, 1983^{i c g}
- Cerceris ropalidioides Evans, 1982^{i c g}
- Cerceris rossica Shestakov, 1914^{i c g}
- Cerceris rostrifera Brauns, 1926^{i c g}
- Cerceris rothi Giner Marí, 1942^{i c g}
- Cerceris rothneyi Cameron, 1890^{i c g}
- Cerceris rozeni Scullen, 1971^{i c g}
- Cerceris rubida (Jurine, 1807)^{i c g}
- Cerceris rubigina X. Li and Q. Li, 2011^{i c g}
- Cerceris rufiabdominalis Wu and Zhou, 1996^{i c g}
- Cerceris ruficapoides Strand, 1910^{i c g}
- Cerceris ruficauda Cameron, 1905^{i c g}
- Cerceris ruficeps F. Smith, 1873^{i c g}
- Cerceris ruficornis (Fabricius, 1793)^{i c g}
- Cerceris rufimana Taschenberg, 1875^{i c g}
- Cerceris rufinoda Cresson, 1865^{i c g}
- Cerceris rufiscutis Cameron, 1908^{i c g}
- Cerceris rufiventris Lepeletier, 1845^{i c g}
- Cerceris rufocincta Gerstäcker, 1858^{i c g}
- Cerceris rufopicta F. Smith, 1856^{i c g b}
- Cerceris rugosa F. Smith, 1856^{i c g}
- Cerceris rugulosa Schrottky, 1909^{i c g}
- Cerceris rustica Taschenberg, 1875^{i c g}
- Cerceris rutila Spinola, 1839^{i c g}
- Cerceris rybyensis (Linnaeus, 1771)^{i c g}
- Cerceris sabulosa (Panzer, 1799)^{i c g}
- Cerceris saegeri Empey, 1970^{i c g}
- Cerceris saevissima F. Smith, 1856^{i c g}
- Cerceris sahlbergi Shestakov, 1918^{i c g}
- Cerceris saishuensis Tsuneki, 1968^{i c g}
- Cerceris salai Giner Marí, 1945^{i c g}
- Cerceris samarensis Tsuneki, 1968^{i c g}
- Cerceris sanluis Fritz and Toro, 1969^{i c g}
- Cerceris saussurei Radoszkowski, 1877^{i c g}
- Cerceris scapularis Schletterer, 1887^{i c g}
- Cerceris schaeuffelei de Beaumont, 1970^{i c g}
- Cerceris schariniensis Kazenas, 1972^{i c g}
- Cerceris schlettereri Radoszkowski, 1888^{i c g}
- Cerceris schmiedeknechti Kohl, 1898^{c g}
- Cerceris schoutedeni Brauns, 1914^{i c g}
- Cerceris schultzei Bischoff, 1913^{i c g}
- Cerceris scutifera Shestakov, 1914^{i c g}
- Cerceris sedula Evans, 1982^{i c g}
- Cerceris seleucos K. Schmidt, 2000^{i c g}
- Cerceris semenovi Shestakov, 1914^{i c g}
- Cerceris semilunata Radoszkowski, 1870^{i c g}
- Cerceris seminigra Taschenberg, 1875^{c g}
- Cerceris seminingra Taschenberg, 1875^{i}
- Cerceris semipetiolata de Saussure, 1867^{i c g}
- Cerceris sepulcralis F. Smith, 1858^{i c g}
- Cerceris serrana Fritz, 1989^{i c g}
- Cerceris severini Kohl, 1913^{i c g}
- Cerceris sexta Say, 1837^{i c g}
- Cerceris sextoides Banks, 1947^{i c g b}
- Cerceris seyrigi Arnold, 1945^{i c g}
- Cerceris shelfordi R. Turner, 1912^{i c g}
- Cerceris shestakovi Gussakovskij, 1952^{i c g}
- Cerceris shestakoviana Gussakovskij, 1952^{i c g}
- Cerceris shirozui Tsuneki, 1968^{i c g}
- Cerceris sibirica F. Morawitz, 1892^{i c g}
- Cerceris siccata Evans, 1982^{i c g}
- Cerceris silvana Schletterer, 1887^{i c g}
- Cerceris simulans de Saussure, 1867^{i c g}
- Cerceris sinaitica de Beaumont, 1951^{i c g}
- Cerceris sinensis F. Smith, 1856^{i c g}
- Cerceris sirdariensis Radoszkowski, 1877^{i c g}
- Cerceris sobo Yasumatsu and Okabe, 1936^{i c g}
- Cerceris sokotrae Kohl, 1906^{i c g}
- Cerceris solitaria Dahlbom, 1845^{i c g}
- Cerceris somalica Arnold, 1940^{i c g}
- Cerceris somotorensis Balthasar, 1956^{i c g}
- Cerceris songhai Guichard, 1993^{i c g}
- Cerceris sororcula Brèthes, 1913^{i c g}
- Cerceris spathulifera Brèthes, 1913^{i c g}
- Cerceris spatulata Reyes, 1986^{i c g}
- Cerceris specifica R. Turner, 1912^{i c g}
- Cerceris spectabilis Radoszkowski, 1886^{i c g}
- Cerceris spectrum Arnold, 1936^{i c g}
- Cerceris specularis A. Costa, 1867^{i c g}
- Cerceris spilota Evans, 1982^{i c g}
- Cerceris spinaea de Beaumont, 1970^{i c g}
- Cerceris spinicaudata Cameron, 1905^{i c g}
- Cerceris spinifera Kazenas, 1974^{i c g}
- Cerceris spiniger Rohwer, 1919^{i c g}
- Cerceris spinipectus F. Smith, 1856^{i c g}
- Cerceris spinipleuris R. Turner, 1918^{i c g}
- Cerceris spirans de Saussure, 1892^{i c g}
- Cerceris splendidissima Giordani Soika, 1942^{i c g}
- Cerceris squamulifera Mickel, 1916^{i c g}
- Cerceris stefanii Ed. André, 1889^{i c g}
- Cerceris stella Shestakov, 1914^{i c g}
- Cerceris sternodonta Gussakovskij, 1938^{i c g}
- Cerceris stevensoni Brauns, 1926^{i c g}
- Cerceris stoeckleini Giner Marí, 1942^{i c g}
- Cerceris storeyi Evans, 1988^{i c g}
- Cerceris straminea Dufour, 1854^{i c g}
- Cerceris strandi Giner Marí, 1943^{i c g}
- Cerceris stratiotes Schletterer, 1887^{i c g}
- Cerceris stratonike K. Schmidt, 2000^{i c g}
- Cerceris striata F. Smith, 1873^{i c g}
- Cerceris strigosa Cameron, 1890^{i c g}
- Cerceris sulphurea Cameron, 1890^{i c g}
- Cerceris sungari Tsuneki, 1961^{i c g}
- Cerceris supraconica Tsuneki, 1961^{i c g}
- Cerceris synagroides R. Turner, 1912^{i c g}
- Cerceris szechuana Tsuneki, 1968^{i c g}
- Cerceris tango Shestakov, 1918^{i c g}
- Cerceris tenuiventris Arnold, 1958^{i c g}
- Cerceris tenuivittata Dufour, 1849^{i c g}
- Cerceris tepaneca de Saussure, 1867^{i c g}
- Cerceris teranishii Sato, 1927^{i c g}
- Cerceris tetradonta Cameron, 1890^{i c g}
- Cerceris texana Scullen, 1964^{i c g}
- Cerceris tibialis Brèthes, 1910^{i c g}
- Cerceris tienchiao Tsuneki, 1968^{i c g}
- Cerceris tiendang Tsuneki, 1961^{i c g}
- Cerceris tingi Fritz and Mariluis, 1976^{i c g}
- Cerceris tinnula Gussakovskij, 1952^{i c g}
- Cerceris tolteca de Saussure, 1867^{i c g b}
- Cerceris tomiyamai Sk. Yamane and Tano, 1995^{i c g}
- Cerceris tonkinensis R. Turner, 1919^{i c g}
- Cerceris townsendi Viereck and Cockerell, 1904^{i c g}
- Cerceris toxopeusi Krombein, 1969^{i c g}
- Cerceris triangularis Reyes, 1986^{i c g}
- Cerceris triangulata Cresson, 1865^{i c g}
- Cerceris trica Fritz and Mariluis, 1976^{i c g}
- Cerceris trichionota Cameron, 1908^{i c g}
- Cerceris trichiosoma Cameron, 1890^{i c g}
- Cerceris trichobunda Strand, 1913^{i c g}
- Cerceris tricolor F. Smith, 1856^{i c g}
- Cerceris tricolorata Spinola, 1839^{i c g}
- Cerceris tridentata Maidl, 1926^{i c g}
- Cerceris trifasciata F. Smith, 1856^{i c g}
- Cerceris trifida Evans, 1982^{i c g}
- Cerceris trimaculata Maidl, 1926^{i c g}
- Cerceris trinitaria Alayo Dalmau, 1968^{i c g}
- Cerceris tristior Morice, 1911^{i c g}
- Cerceris truncata Cameron, 1890^{i c g}
- Cerceris tshontandae Arnold, 1946^{i c g}
- Cerceris tuberculata (de Villers, 1789)^{i c g}
- Cerceris tucuman Fritz and Toro, 1974^{i c g}
- Cerceris tumulorum F. Smith, 1865^{i c g}
- Cerceris turanica Kazenas, 1980^{i c g}
- Cerceris turkmenica Kazenas, 1984^{i c g}
- Cerceris turneri Shestakov, 1918^{i c g}
- Cerceris tyrannica F. Smith, 1856^{i c g}
- Cerceris ugandensis Arnold, 1931^{i c g}
- Cerceris ulcerosa Arnold, 1936^{i c g}
- Cerceris umbelliferarum Schrottky, 1911^{i c g}
- Cerceris umbinifera Maidl, 1926^{i c g}
- Cerceris umhlangae Arnold, 1942^{i c g}
- Cerceris uncifera Arnold, 1931^{i c g}
- Cerceris uncta Arnold, 1931^{i c g}
- Cerceris unidentata F. Morawitz, 1890^{i c g}
- Cerceris unifasciata F. Smith, 1856^{i c g}
- Cerceris unispinosa R. Turner, 1917^{i c g}
- Cerceris uvarovi Kazenas, 1984^{i c g}
- Cerceris vagans Radoszkowski, 1877^{i c g}
- Cerceris vagula Kohl, 1906^{i c g}
- Cerceris vanduzeei Banks, 1917^{i c g}
- Cerceris varicincta Cameron, 1905^{i c g}
- Cerceris varipes F. Smith, 1858^{i c g}
- Cerceris vechti Krombein, 1969^{i c g}
- Cerceris vegeta Arnold, 1940^{i c g}
- Cerceris vellensis Krombein, 1969^{i c g}
- Cerceris velutina Taschenberg, 1875^{i c g}
- Cerceris ventricornis Reyes, 1988^{i c g}
- Cerceris ventripilosa Empey, 1972^{i c g}
- Cerceris venusta F. Smith, 1873^{i c g}
- Cerceris verecunda Arnold, 1958^{i c g}
- Cerceris verhoeffi Tsuneki, 1961^{i c g}
- Cerceris vernayi Arnold, 1935^{i c g}
- Cerceris versicolor Schrottky, 1909^{i c g}
- Cerceris verticalis F. Smith, 1856^{i c g}
- Cerceris vianai Fritz and Toro, 1969^{i c g}
- Cerceris vicaria Shestakov, 1915^{i c g}
- Cerceris vicina Cresson, 1865^{i c g}
- Cerceris vicinoides Viereck and Cockerell, 1904^{i c g}
- Cerceris victori Genaro, 2009^{i c g}
- Cerceris victrix R. Turner, 1910^{i c g}
- Cerceris vierecki Banks, 1947^{i c g}
- Cerceris vigilans F. Smith, 1856^{i c g}
- Cerceris villiersi Berland, 1950^{i c g}
- Cerceris violaceipennis Cameron, 1904^{i c g}
- Cerceris vischnu Cameron, 1890^{i c g}
- Cerceris vittata Lepeletier, 1845^{i c g}
- Cerceris vitticollis F. Morawitz, 1894^{i c g}
- Cerceris vulcanica van-der Vecht, 1964^{g}
- Cerceris vulcanica van der Vecht, 1964^{i c}
- Cerceris vulpecula Empey, 1971^{i c g}
- Cerceris vulpinides Strand, 1910^{i c g}
- Cerceris waltoni Arnold, 1940^{i c g}
- Cerceris watlingensis Elliott and Salbert, 1979^{i c g}
- Cerceris wickwari R. Turner, 1912^{i c g}
- Cerceris willineri Fritz, 1960^{i c g}
- Cerceris willinki Fritz, 1983^{i c g}
- Cerceris windorum Tsuneki, 1968^{i c g}
- Cerceris wroughtoni Cameron, 1890^{i c g}
- Cerceris wyomingensis Scullen, 1965^{i c g}
- Cerceris xanthogaster Arnold, 1942^{i c g}
- Cerceris xanthosoma Yamane and Tano, 1995^{i c g}
- Cerceris xanthostigma Arnold, 1945^{i c g}
- Cerceris xanthura Evans, 1982^{c g}
- Cerceris xosa Brauns, 1926^{i c g}
- Cerceris yalensis R. Turner, 1913^{i c g}
- Cerceris yenpingensis Tsuneki, 1968^{i c g}
- Cerceris yngvei Cameron, 1908^{i c g}
- Cerceris yunnanensis Tsuneki, 1968^{i c g}
- Cerceris yuwanensis Tsuneki, 1982^{i c g}
- Cerceris zacatecas Scullen, 1972^{i c g}
- Cerceris zain Fritz, 1990^{i c g}
- Cerceris zapoteca de Saussure, 1867^{i c g}
- Cerceris zavattarii Guiglia, 1939^{i c g}
- Cerceris zebra Guichard, 1993^{i c g}
- Cerceris zelichi Fritz and Mariluis, 1976^{i c g}
- Cerceris zhdankoi Kazenas, 2006^{i c g}
- Cerceris zhelochovtsevi Kazenas, 1984^{i c g}
- Cerceris zoellneri Sielfeld, 1971^{i c g}
- Cerceris zonalis F. Smith, 1852^{i c g}
- Cerceris zonata Cresson, 1865^{i c g}
- Cerceris zumpango Scullen, 1972^{i c g}

Data sources: i = ITIS, c = Catalogue of Life, g = GBIF, b = Bugguide.net
