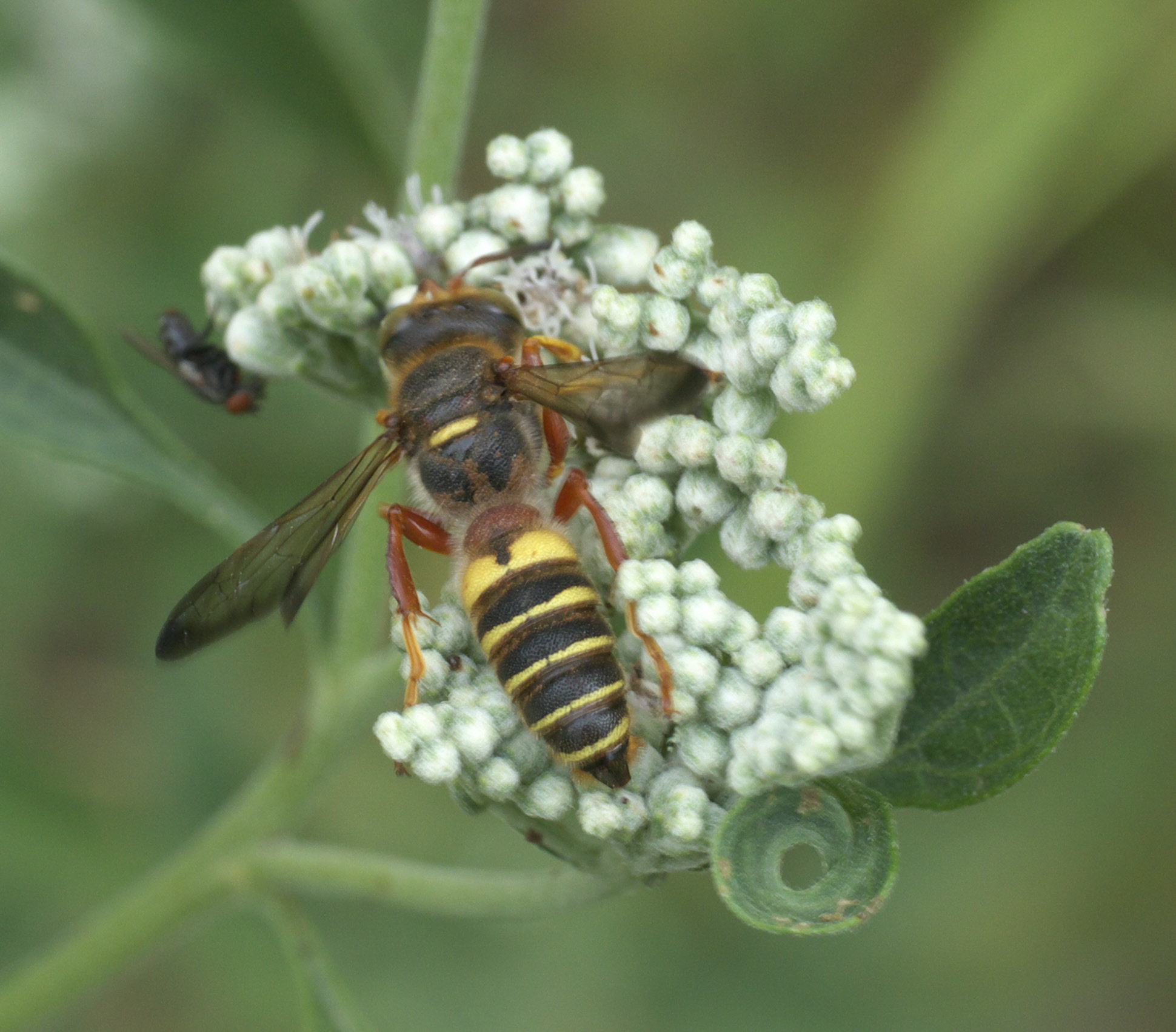

Scientific classification
- Domain: Eukaryota
- Kingdom: Animalia
- Phylum: Arthropoda
- Class: Insecta
- Order: Hymenoptera
- Family: Philanthidae
- Tribe: Cercerini
- Genus: Cerceris
- Species: C. bicornuta

Binomial name
- Cerceris bicornuta Guérin-Méneville, 1844

Synonyms
- Cerceris curvicornis Cameron, 1890; Cerceris dufourii Guérin-Méneville, 1844; Cerceris fidelis Viereck and Cockerell, 1904; Cerceris venator Cresson, 1865

= Cerceris bicornuta =

Species of wasp

Cerceris bicornuta is a species of wasp in the family Philanthidae. It is found in Central America and North America.

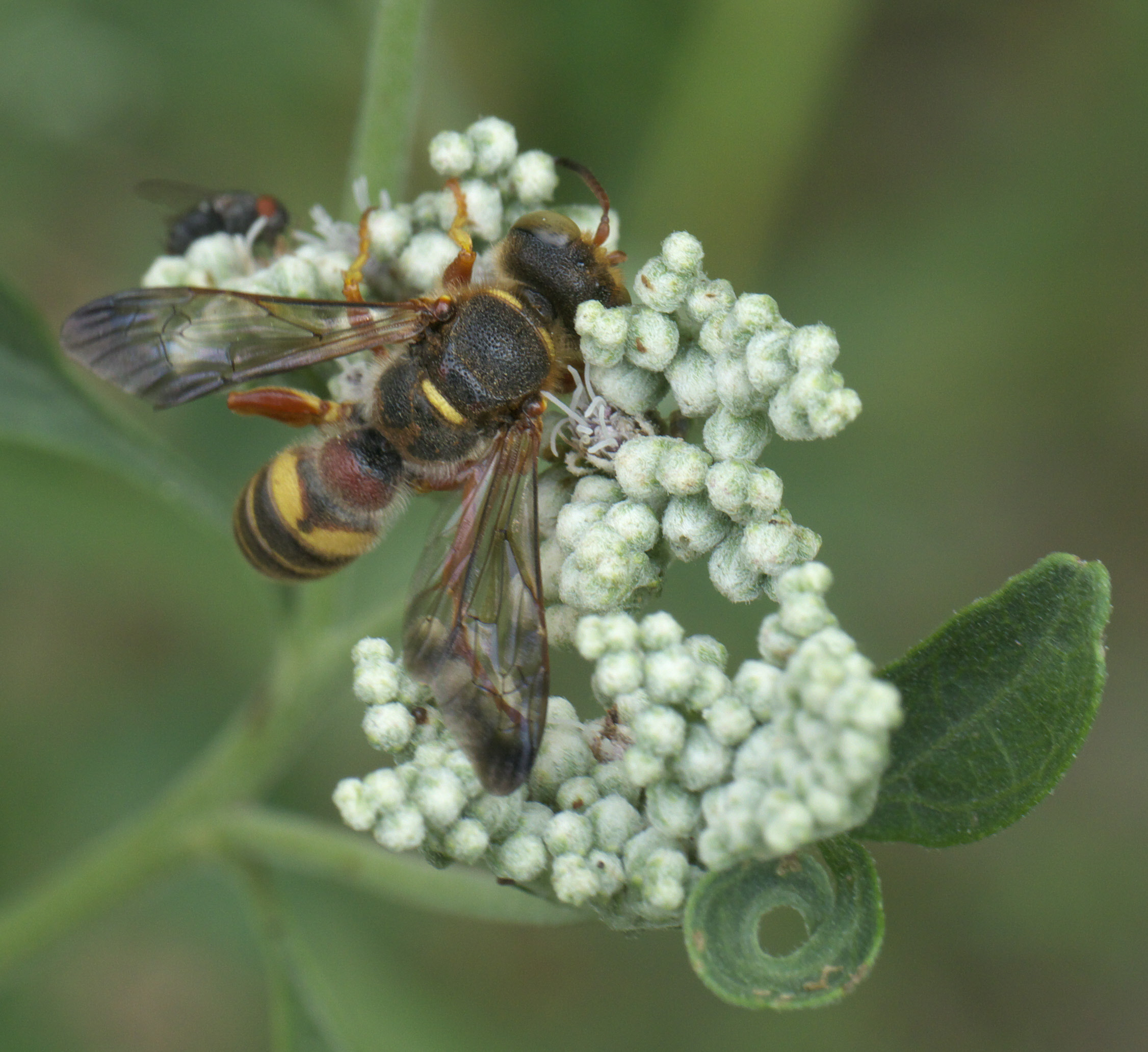
