= Cerceris atramontensis =

Scientific classification
- Domain: Eukaryota
- Kingdom: Animalia
- Phylum: Arthropoda
- Class: Insecta
- Order: Hymenoptera
- Family: Philanthidae
- Tribe: Cercerini
- Genus: Cerceris
- Species: C. atramontensis

Binomial name
- Cerceris atramontensis Banks, 1913

Synonyms
- Cerceris arbuscula Mickel, 1916

Species of wasp

Cerceris atramontensis is a species of wasp in the family Philanthidae. It is found in North America.
