= Cerceris arelate =

Scientific classification
- Domain: Eukaryota
- Kingdom: Animalia
- Phylum: Arthropoda
- Class: Insecta
- Order: Hymenoptera
- Family: Philanthidae
- Tribe: Cercerini
- Genus: Cerceris
- Species: C. arelate

Binomial name
- Cerceris arelate Banks, 1912

Synonyms
- Cerceris crawfordi Brimley, 1928; Cerceris nigritula Banks, 1915

Species of wasp

Cerceris arelate is a species of wasp in the family Philanthidae. It is found in North America.
