= Cerceris halone =

Scientific classification
- Domain: Eukaryota
- Kingdom: Animalia
- Phylum: Arthropoda
- Class: Insecta
- Order: Hymenoptera
- Family: Philanthidae
- Tribe: Cercerini
- Genus: Cerceris
- Species: C. halone

Binomial name
- Cerceris halone Banks, 1912

Synonyms
- Cerceris architis Mickel, 1916; Cerceris salome Banks, 1923; Cerceris shermani Brimley, 1928; Cerceris stigmosalis Banks, 1916

Species of wasp

Cerceris halone is a species of wasp in the family Philanthidae. It is found in Central America and North America. It is a known predator of Curculionidae beetles and nests in sand.
