= Cerceris rufopicta =

Scientific classification
- Domain: Eukaryota
- Kingdom: Animalia
- Phylum: Arthropoda
- Class: Insecta
- Order: Hymenoptera
- Family: Philanthidae
- Tribe: Cercerini
- Genus: Cerceris
- Species: C. rufopicta

Binomial name
- Cerceris rufopicta F. Smith, 1856

Synonyms
- Cerceris austrina W. Fox, 1893; Cerceris pleuralis H. Smith, 1908; Cerceris robertsonii W. Fox, 1893; Cerceris robertsonii bifida Scullen, 1965; Cerceris robertsonii emmiltosa Scullen, 1964; Cerceris robertsonii miltosa Scullen, 1965

Species of wasp

Cerceris rufopicta is a species of wasp in the family Philanthidae. It is found in North America.
