= Cerceris sextoides =

Scientific classification
- Domain: Eukaryota
- Kingdom: Animalia
- Phylum: Arthropoda
- Class: Insecta
- Order: Hymenoptera
- Family: Philanthidae
- Tribe: Cercerini
- Genus: Cerceris
- Species: C. sextoides

Binomial name
- Cerceris sextoides Banks, 1947

Synonyms
- Cerceris eurymele Banks, 1947

Species of wasp

Cerceris sextoides is a species of wasp in the family Philanthidae. It is found in Central America and North America.
