= Cerceris tolteca =

Scientific classification
- Domain: Eukaryota
- Kingdom: Animalia
- Phylum: Arthropoda
- Class: Insecta
- Order: Hymenoptera
- Family: Philanthidae
- Tribe: Cercerini
- Genus: Cerceris
- Species: C. tolteca

Binomial name
- Cerceris tolteca de Saussure, 1867

Synonyms
- Cerceris cosmiocephala Cameron, 1904

Species of wasp

Cerceris tolteca is a species of wasp in the family Philanthidae. It is found in Central America.
