= Cerceris nigrescens =

Scientific classification
- Domain: Eukaryota
- Kingdom: Animalia
- Phylum: Arthropoda
- Class: Insecta
- Order: Hymenoptera
- Family: Philanthidae
- Tribe: Cercerini
- Genus: Cerceris
- Species: C. nigrescens

Binomial name
- Cerceris nigrescens F. Smith, 1856

Synonyms
- Cerceris abbreviata Banks, 1919; Cerceris munda Mickel, 1918; Cerceris nigrescens munda Mickel, 1918

Species of wasp

Cerceris nigrescens is a species of wasp in the family Philanthidae. It is found in North America.
