= Cerceris elegans =

Scientific classification
- Domain: Eukaryota
- Kingdom: Animalia
- Phylum: Arthropoda
- Class: Insecta
- Order: Hymenoptera
- Family: Philanthidae
- Genus: Cerceris
- Species: C. elegans

Binomial name
- Cerceris elegans Eversmann 1849

Species of wasp

Cerceris elegans is a species of wasp in the family Philanthidae. It is found in Russia.
