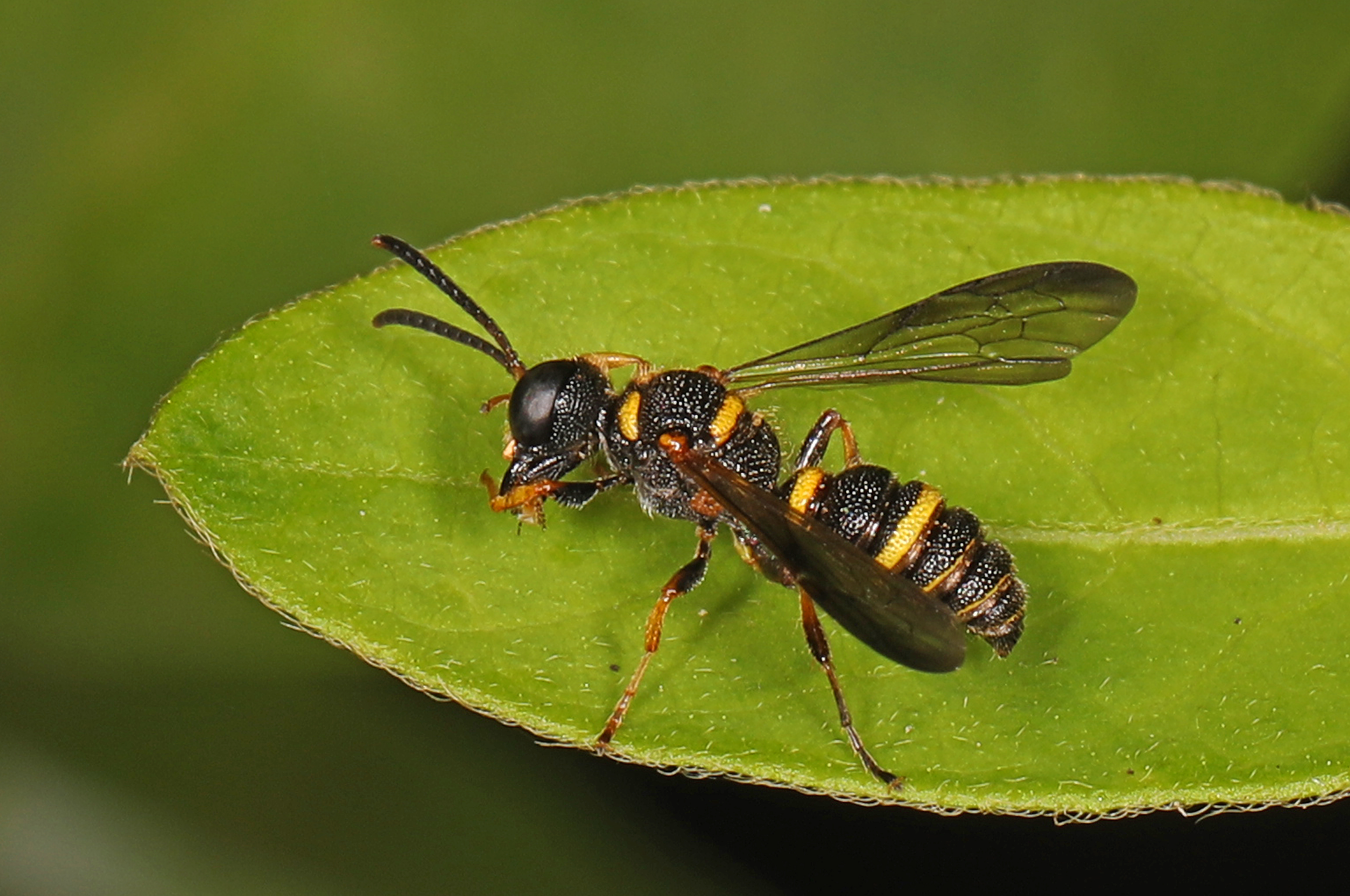

Scientific classification
- Domain: Eukaryota
- Kingdom: Animalia
- Phylum: Arthropoda
- Class: Insecta
- Order: Hymenoptera
- Family: Philanthidae
- Genus: Cerceris
- Species: C. insolita

Binomial name
- Cerceris insolita Cresson, 1865

Synonyms
- Cerceris insolita albida Scullen, 1965; Cerceris insolita atrafemori Scullen, 1965; Cerceris intractibilis Mickel, 1916

= Cerceris insolita =

Species of wasp

Cerceris insolita is a species of wasp in the family Philanthidae. It is found in North America.
