= Cerceris frontata =

Scientific classification
- Domain: Eukaryota
- Kingdom: Animalia
- Phylum: Arthropoda
- Class: Insecta
- Order: Hymenoptera
- Family: Philanthidae
- Genus: Cerceris
- Species: C. frontata

Binomial name
- Cerceris frontata Say, 1823

Synonyms
- Cerceris frontata raui Rohwer, 1920; Cerceris occidentalis de Saussure, 1867; Cerceris raui Rohwer, 1920

Species of wasp

Cerceris frontata is a species of wasp in the family Philanthidae. It is found in North America.
