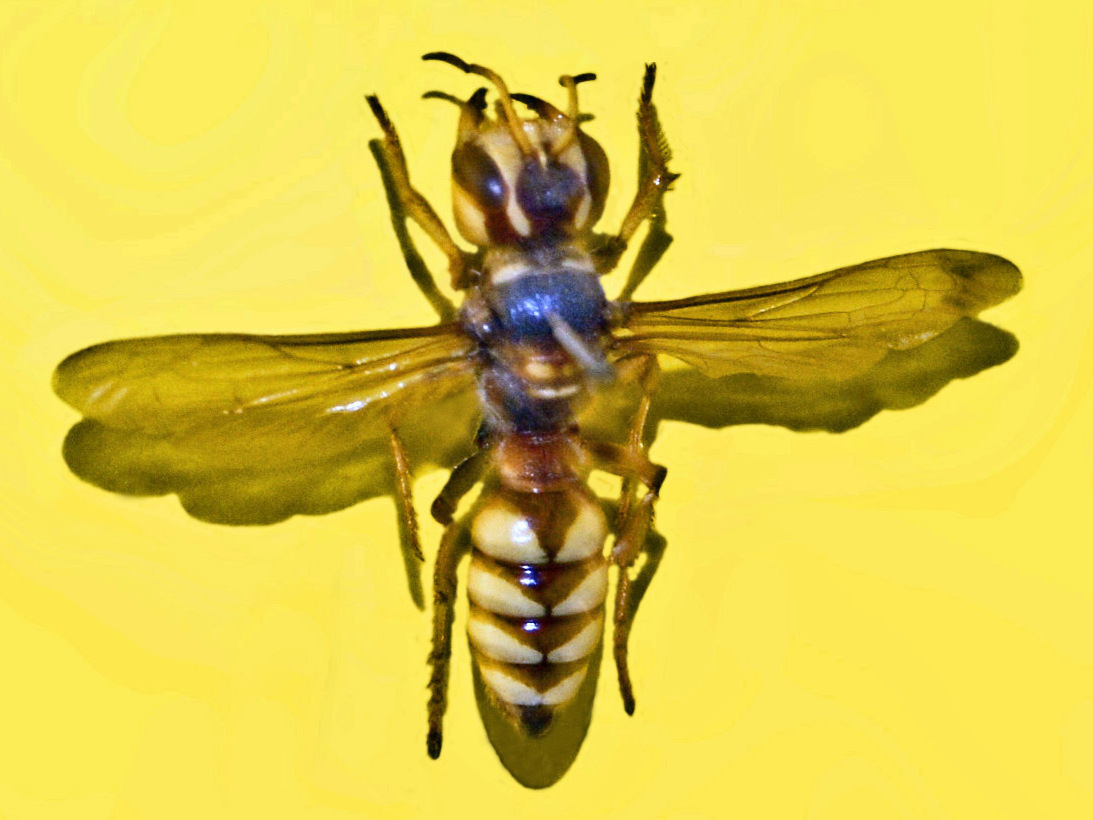
- Cerceris tuberculata. Museum specimen

Scientific classification
- Domain: Eukaryota
- Kingdom: Animalia
- Phylum: Arthropoda
- Class: Insecta
- Order: Hymenoptera
- Family: Philanthidae
- Genus: Cerceris
- Species: C. tuberculata

Binomial name
- Cerceris tuberculata (Villers, 1787)

Synonyms
- Sphex tuberculata Villers, 1789; Crabro rufipes Fabricius, 1787; Vespa hispanica Gmelin, 1790; Cerceris major Spinola, 1808; Cerceris dufouriana Fabre, 1855; Cerceris semirufa F. Smith, 1856

= Cerceris tuberculata =

Species of wasp

Cerceris tuberculata is a species of wasp in the family Philanthidae.

== Description ==
Cerceris tuberculata, the largest representative of the genus in Europe, can reach a length of 17–22 millimetres (0.67–0.87 in).

The adult female of Cerceris tuberculata digs a nest in the soil at a depth of about 50 cm. and provisions it with living prey items she has paralyzed with venom. Prey items are commonly weevils of the genus Cleonis.

Adults fly from mid-July to September. They feed on the nectar of flowers (usually Apiaceae and Asteraceae).

== Distribution ==
This species is present in Albania, Bulgaria, Croatia, France, Greece, Hungary, Italy, Portugal, Russia, Spain and former Jugoslavia.
