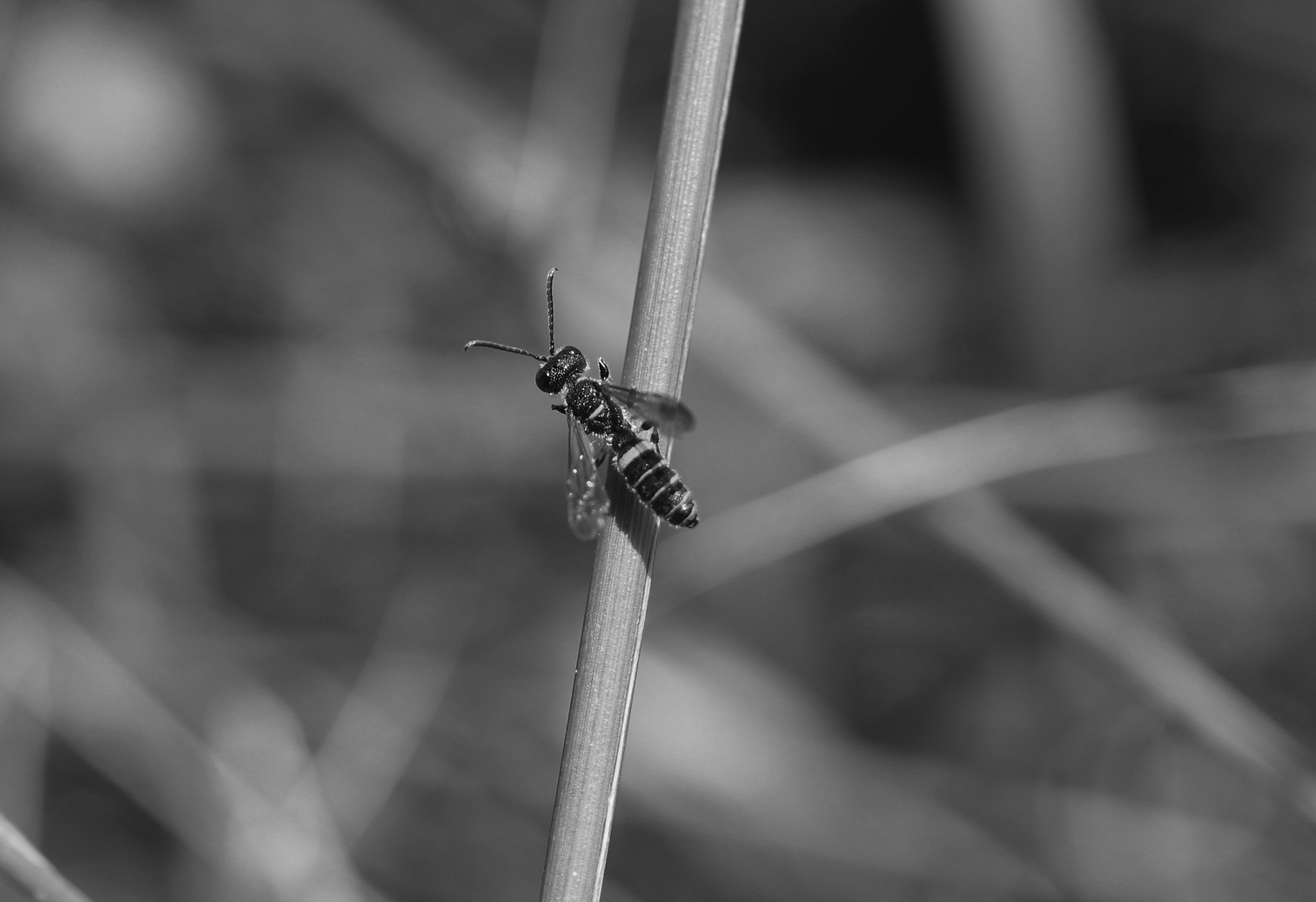
- A male of Cerceris Clypeata on his perch, a grass stem

Scientific classification
- Domain: Eukaryota
- Kingdom: Animalia
- Phylum: Arthropoda
- Class: Insecta
- Order: Hymenoptera
- Family: Philanthidae
- Genus: Cerceris
- Species: C. clypeata

Binomial name
- Cerceris clypeata Dahlbom, 1844

Synonyms
- Cerceris chryssipe Banks, 1912; Cerceris clymene Banks, 1912; Cerceris imitator Cresson, 1865; Cerceris imitatoria Schletterer, 1887; Cerceris zobeide Brimley, 1929; Cerceris zosma Brimley, 1929

= Cerceris clypeata =

Species of insect

Cerceris clypeata is a species of solitary weevil wasp in the family Philanthidae. It can be found in North America.
