= Cerceris yuwanensis =

Scientific classification
- Domain: Eukaryota
- Kingdom: Animalia
- Phylum: Arthropoda
- Class: Insecta
- Order: Hymenoptera
- Family: Philanthidae
- Genus: Cerceris
- Species: C. yuwanensis

Binomial name
- Cerceris yuwanensis Tsuneki, 1982

Species of wasp

Cerceris yuwanensis is a species of wasp in the family Philanthidae that is found in Japan.
