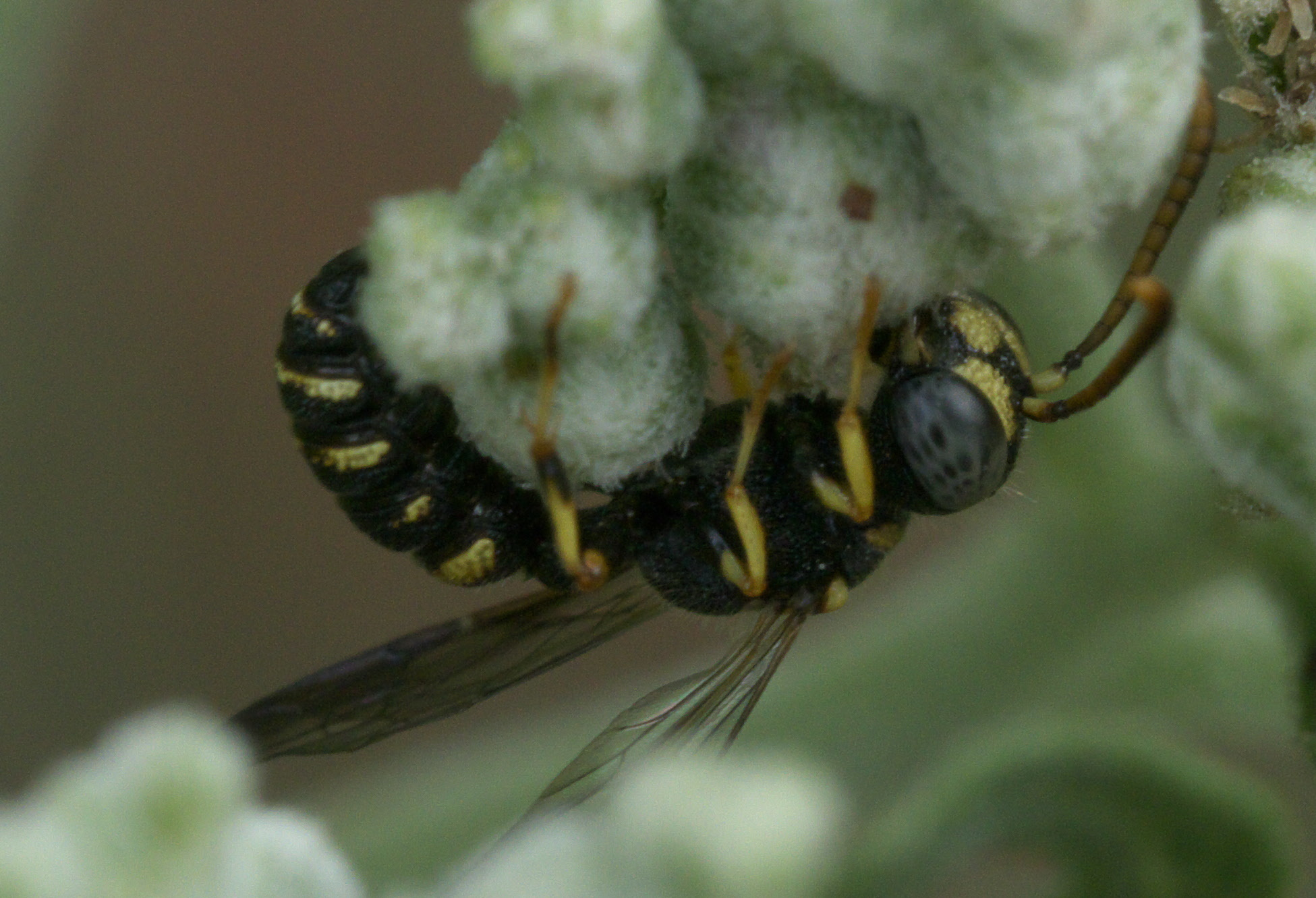

Scientific classification
- Domain: Eukaryota
- Kingdom: Animalia
- Phylum: Arthropoda
- Class: Insecta
- Order: Hymenoptera
- Family: Philanthidae
- Genus: Cerceris
- Species: C. kennicottii

Binomial name
- Cerceris kennicottii Cresson, 1865

Synonyms
- Cerceris eriogoni Viereck and Cockerell, 1904; Cerceris kennicottii beali Scullen, 1965; Cerceris montivaga Cameron, 1890

= Cerceris kennicottii =

Species of insect

Cerceris kennicottii is a species of wasp in the family Philanthidae. It is found in Central America and North America.

== Subspecies ==
These two subspecies belong to the species Cerceris kennicottii:

- Cerceris kennicottii chinandegaensis Cameron, 1904
- Cerceris kennicottii kennicottii Cresson, 1865
