= Cerceris californica =

Scientific classification
- Domain: Eukaryota
- Kingdom: Animalia
- Phylum: Arthropoda
- Class: Insecta
- Order: Hymenoptera
- Family: Philanthidae
- Genus: Cerceris
- Species: C. californica

Binomial name
- Cerceris californica Cresson, 1865

Synonyms
- Cerceris argyrotricha Rohwer, 1908; Cerceris arno Banks, 1947; Cerceris californica argyrotricha Rohwer, 1908; Cerceris californica arno Banks, 1947; Cerceris calodera Banks, 1947; Cerceris cognata Mickel, 1916; Cerceris denticularis Banks, 1917; Cerceris ferruginior Viereck and Cockerell, 1904; Cerceris garciana Viereck and Cockerell, 1904; Cerceris illota Banks, 1947; Cerceris interjecta Banks, 1919; Cerceris populorum Viereck and Cockerell, 1904

Species of wasp

Cerceris californica is a species of wasp in the family Philanthidae. It is found in Central America and North America. This species is a predator of Buprestidae beetles.
