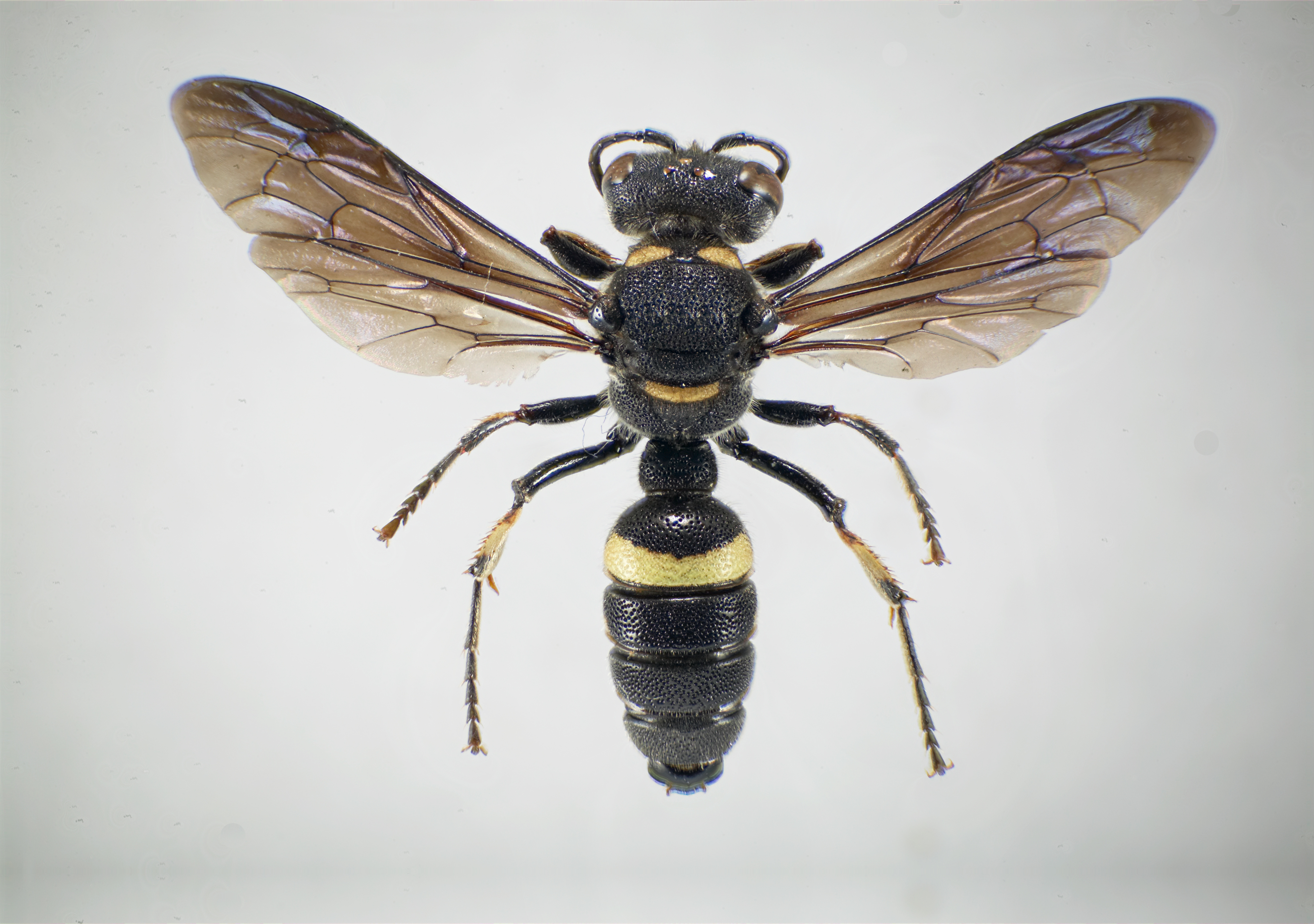

Scientific classification
- Kingdom: Animalia
- Phylum: Arthropoda
- Class: Insecta
- Order: Hymenoptera
- Family: Philanthidae
- Genus: Cerceris
- Species: C. fumipennis

Binomial name
- Cerceris fumipennis Say, 1837

= Cerceris fumipennis =

Species of wasp

Cerceris fumipennis, the only species of buprestid-hunting Philanthidae occurring in eastern North America, is found throughout the continental United States east of the Rockies, from Texas and Florida north to Maine, Wyoming, and into Canada. The wasps most often nest in open areas of hard-packed sandy soil surrounded by woody habitat suitable for their buprestid beetle prey.

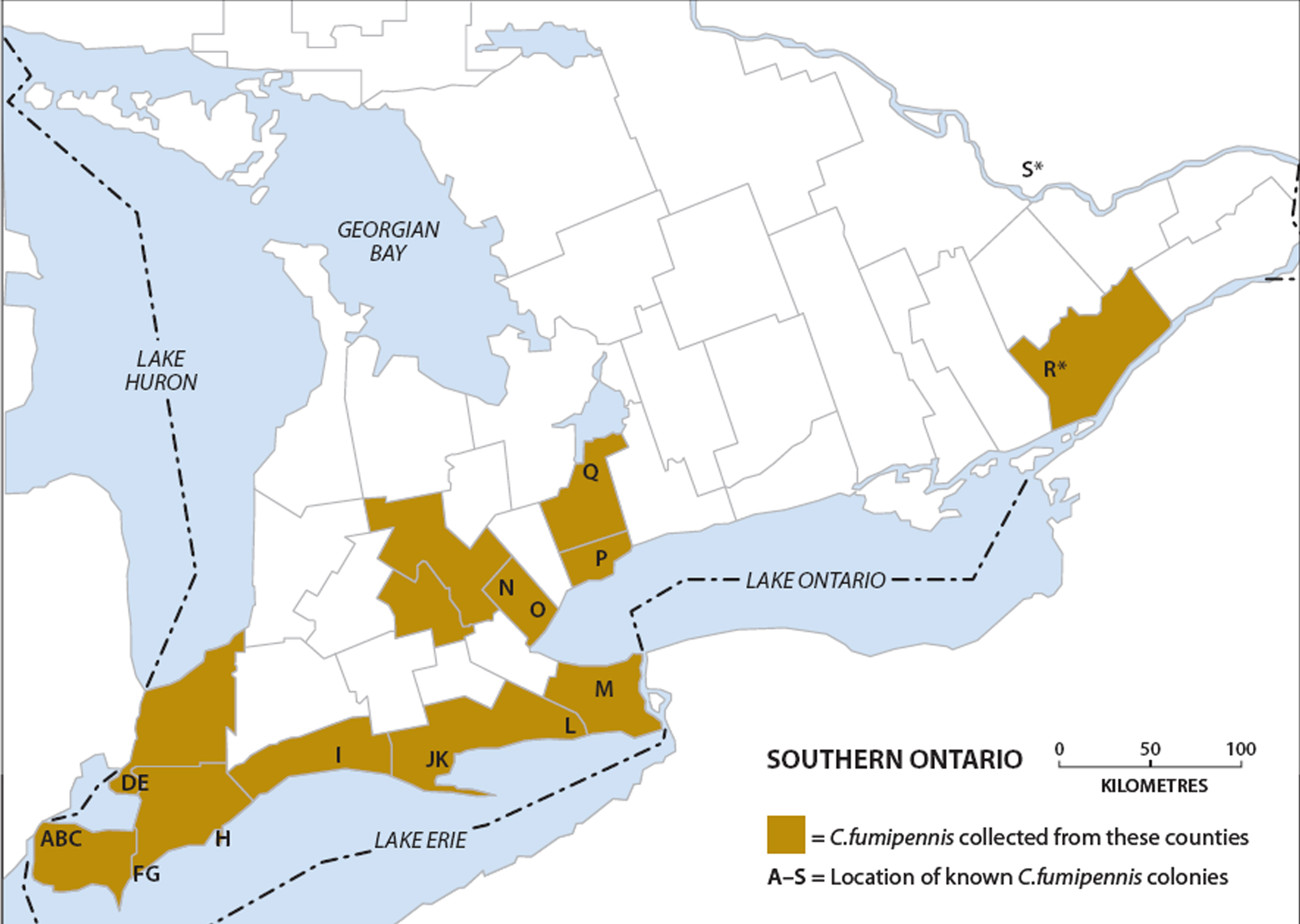
Known C. fumipennis colonies in Ontario, Canada

== Identification ==
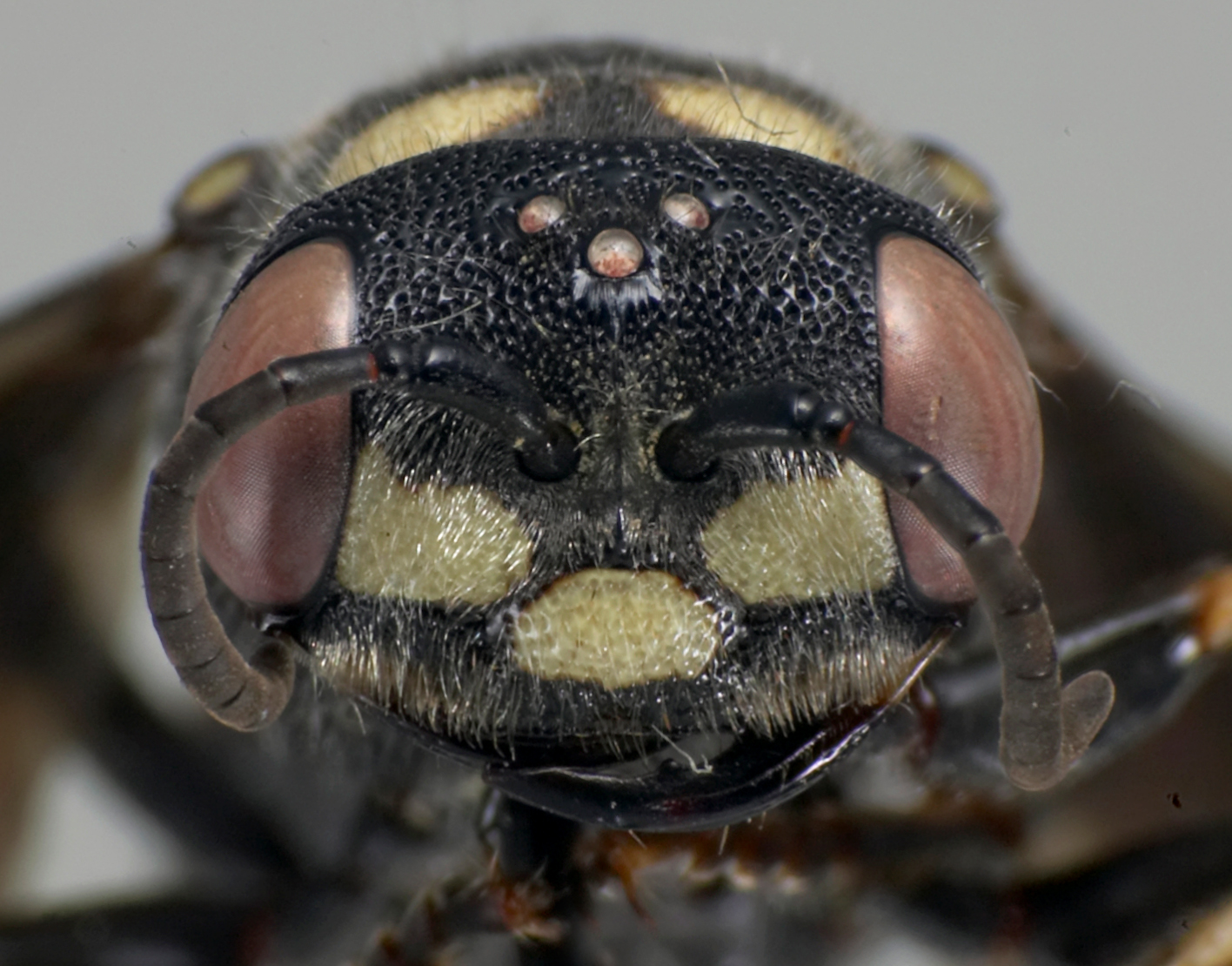
Female C. fumipennis

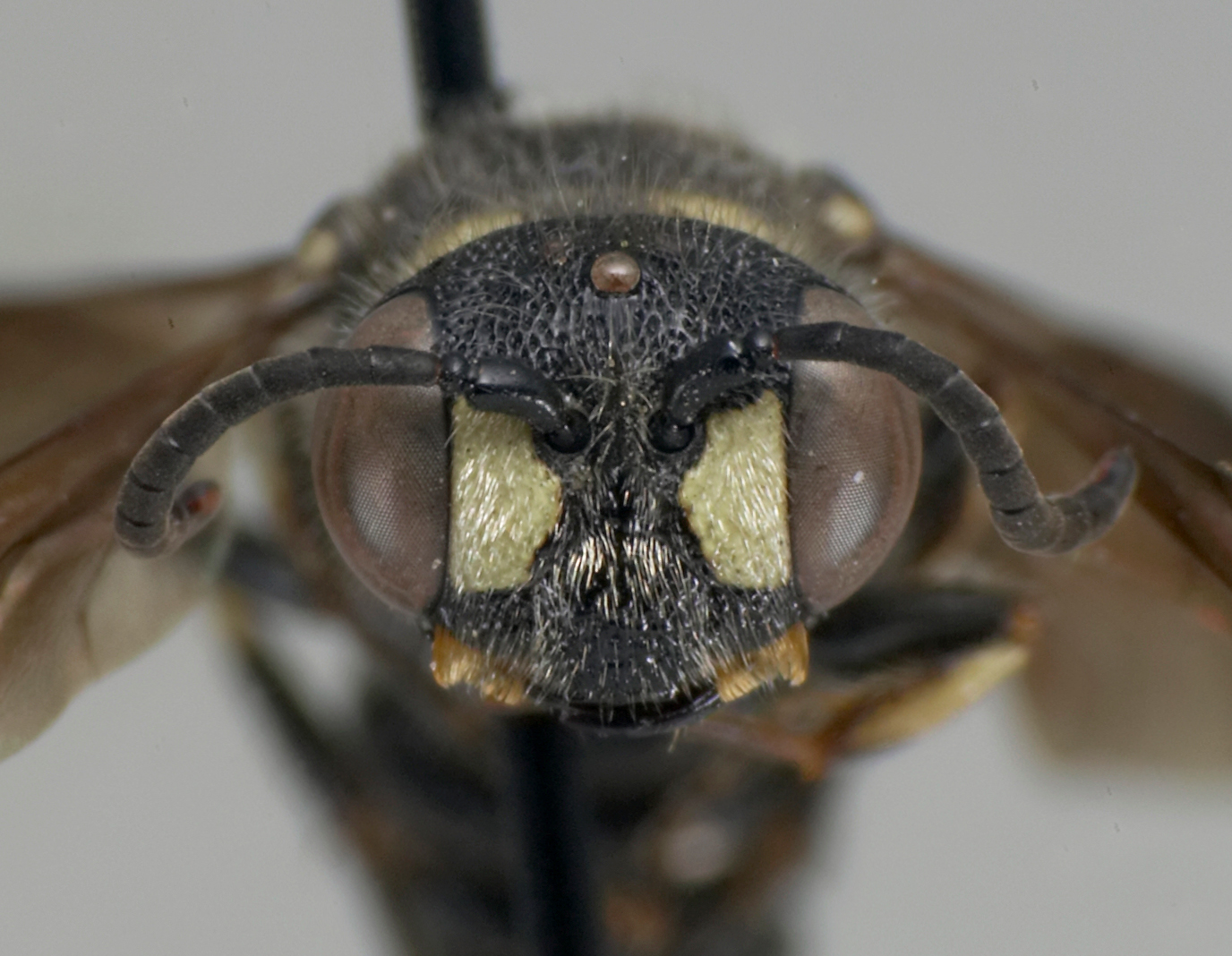
Male C. Fumipennis

Cerceris fumipennis is distinguished by five conspicuous characteristics:

- It is large, about the size of common yellow jacket wasps.
- It has dark smoky, blue/black wings.
- The wasp's body is predominantly black except for a few yellow markings.
- It has a conspicuous, single, broad, creamy yellow abdominal band.
- Females have three creamy patches between the eyes, while males are marked with two yellow triangles abutting their eyes.

== Biology ==
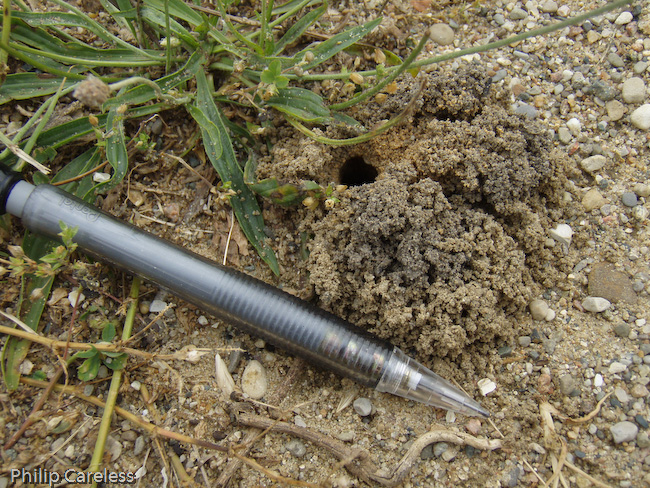
Entrance of a C. fumipennis nest

Cerceris fumipennis is a solitary, ground-nesting wasp. Each lone female constructs and attempts to maintain a single subterranean nest for the duration of the flight season. Her solitary nest is in close proximity to others, forming a neighborhood or informal colony of nests. The nest's entrance is easily visible, marked by a small, circular mound of earth. Each nest is composed of a single entrance hole, which leads to subterranean cells. Like many apoid wasps, C. fumipennis females mass provision for their cells before laying an egg in them. Adult females provision their cells with beetles of the family Buprestidae.

When hunting for buprestid prey, the maximum foraging range of the wasp is estimated at 2 km with an estimated average flight distance of 750 m (800 yd) from the nest. Once prey has been found, a female wasp typically attacks the target beetle by alighting on it, climbing over it, and grabbing it by the thorax with her mandibles before inserting her stinger into the base of the beetle's leg (in the membrane of the coxal joint, a gap in the buprestid's armor) and injecting a paralytic venom. Once at the nest entrance or in the burrow, the female wasp sometimes stings poorly paralyzed prey again in the same joint.

Within minutes of placing the final paralyzed beetle into its subterranean cell, she lays a single, hotdog-shaped egg along the beetle's mesosternum. Prey beetles are paralyzed, not killed, ensuring that each beetle does not spoil until the wasp larva can begin feeding upon it. After the egg is laid, the completed cell is detached from the burrow as the female wasp backfills the access with 3 – 6 cm of soil.

Once one cell is completed, the wasp begins work on the next cell by excavating in a new direction off the main burrow. Most cells (around five to 12, but up to 24) are constructed 7–20 cm below grade with the egg, larval, and pupal stages all developing within the confines of the single nest. In Ontario, the time spent in the brood cell is about 10 months.

Emergence dates and speed of the life cycle vary across the wasp's broad distribution. In Ontario, the flight season typically begins the last week of June and continues until early September. Emergence dates and duration of flight season can be influenced by droughts, which could postpone emergence or shorten the flight season. Ontario colonies are associated with somewhat disturbed sites compacted by human activity such as baseball diamonds, parking areas, infrequently used roads, roadsides, footpaths, and the soil around campfire pits.

== Value for biosurveillance ==
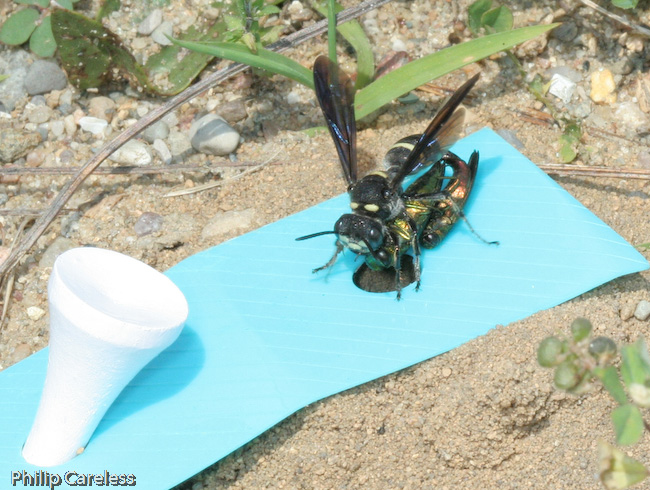
A C. fumipennis entering a nest with two buprestid prey

In collecting buprestid prey, C. fumipennis has also been recorded collecting emerald ash borer (EAB; Agrilus planipennis), a pest insect known for killing North American species of ash trees. The EAB has proven difficult to detect using traditional methods of ground/visual surveys and sticky traps, both of which are costly, labour-intensive, and at times destructive or impractical. Biosurveillance, using another species to survey for a pest species, offers an alternative approach for the detection and survey of EAB populations. Preliminary studies have shown that the wasp's EAB detection skills far surpass any comparable human technology. C. fumipennis has become a novel ally in efforts to monitor for EABs in Canada and the United States.

Researchers have unofficially nicknamed C. fumipennis the "smoky-winged beetle bandit”. This name has now been submitted to the Entomological Society of America's committee on common names. By transporting mobile populations of this wasp, biosurveillance could facilitate an early warning system for the EAB across the United States and Canada. Using trained wasp watchers to look for what C. fumipennis brings back to its ground nest entrance could augment an early warning system that currently only uses "Purple Barney traps" that mimic the same color spectrum as Fraxinus ash tree leaves, to attract the EAB.
