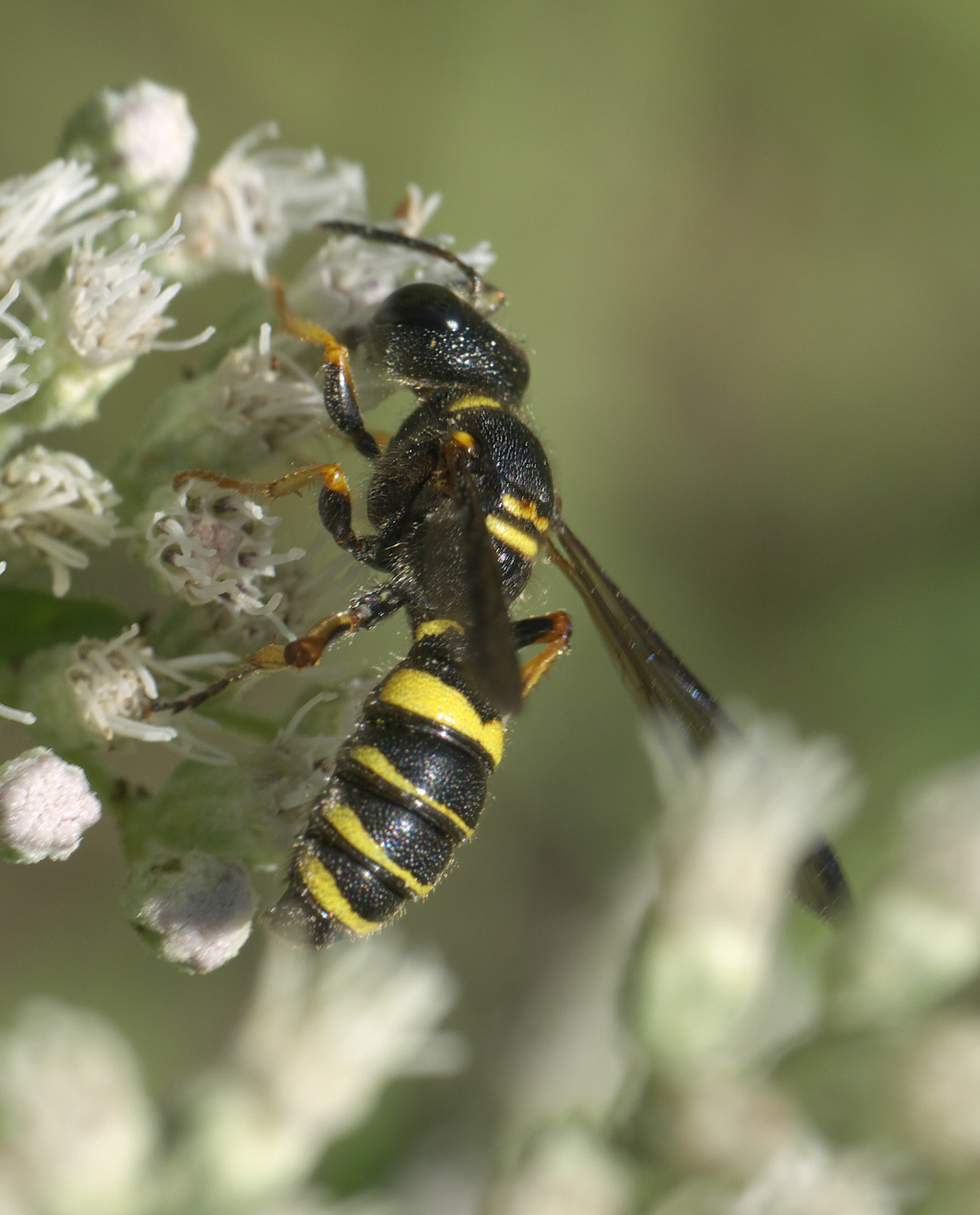
- Cerceris

Scientific classification
- Kingdom: Animalia
- Phylum: Arthropoda
- Class: Insecta
- Order: Hymenoptera
- Family: Philanthidae
- Tribe: Cercerini; Lepeletier, 1845

= Cercerini =

Subfamily of insects

Cercerinae is a Subfamily of wasps in the family Philanthidae. There are 2 genera and 937 described species in Cercerinae. About 896 of these species are in the large genus Cerceris.

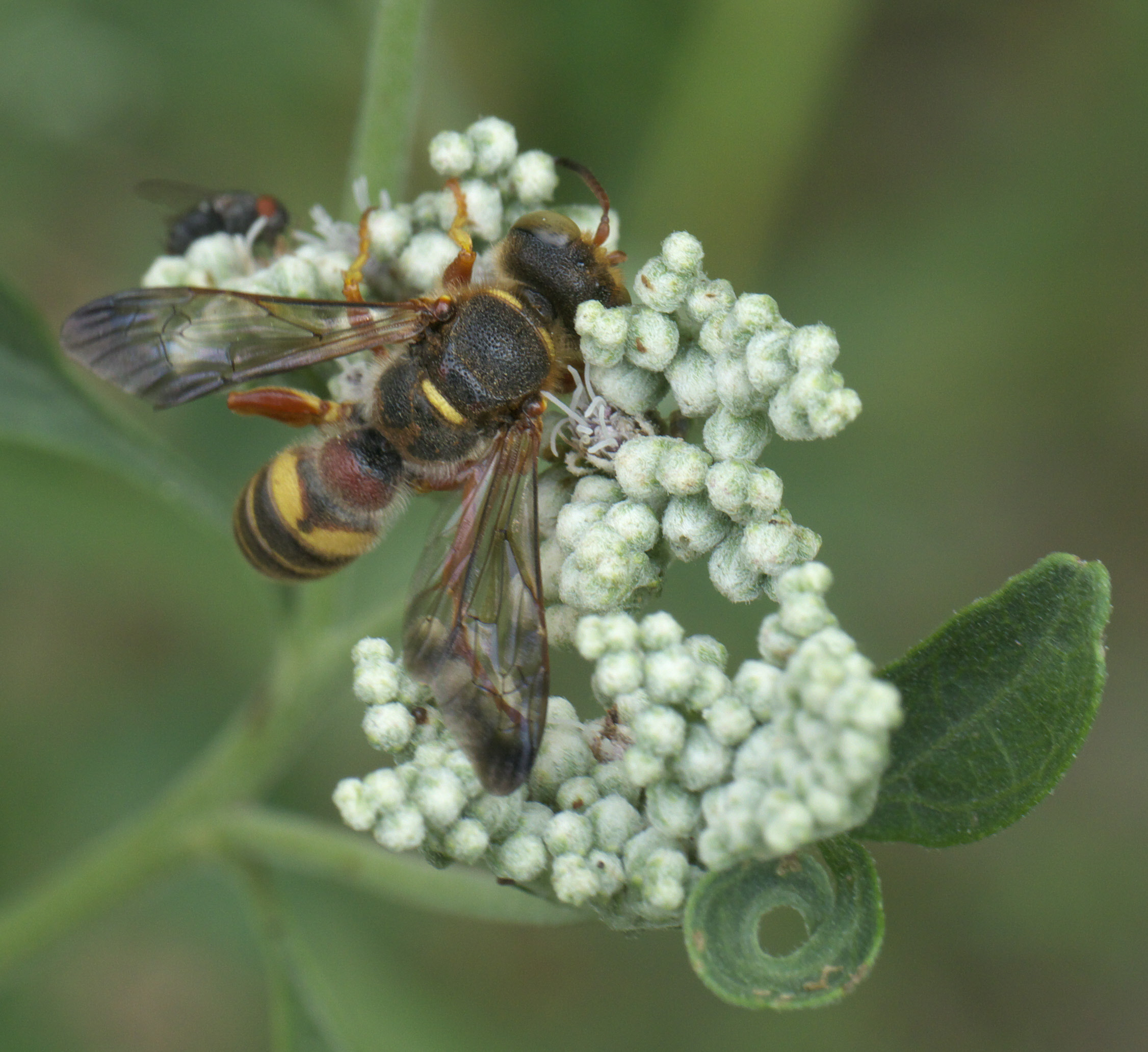
Cerceris bicornuta

== Genera ==
These two genera belong to the subfamily Cercerinae:

- Cerceris Latreille, 1802
- Eucerceris Cresson, 1865
