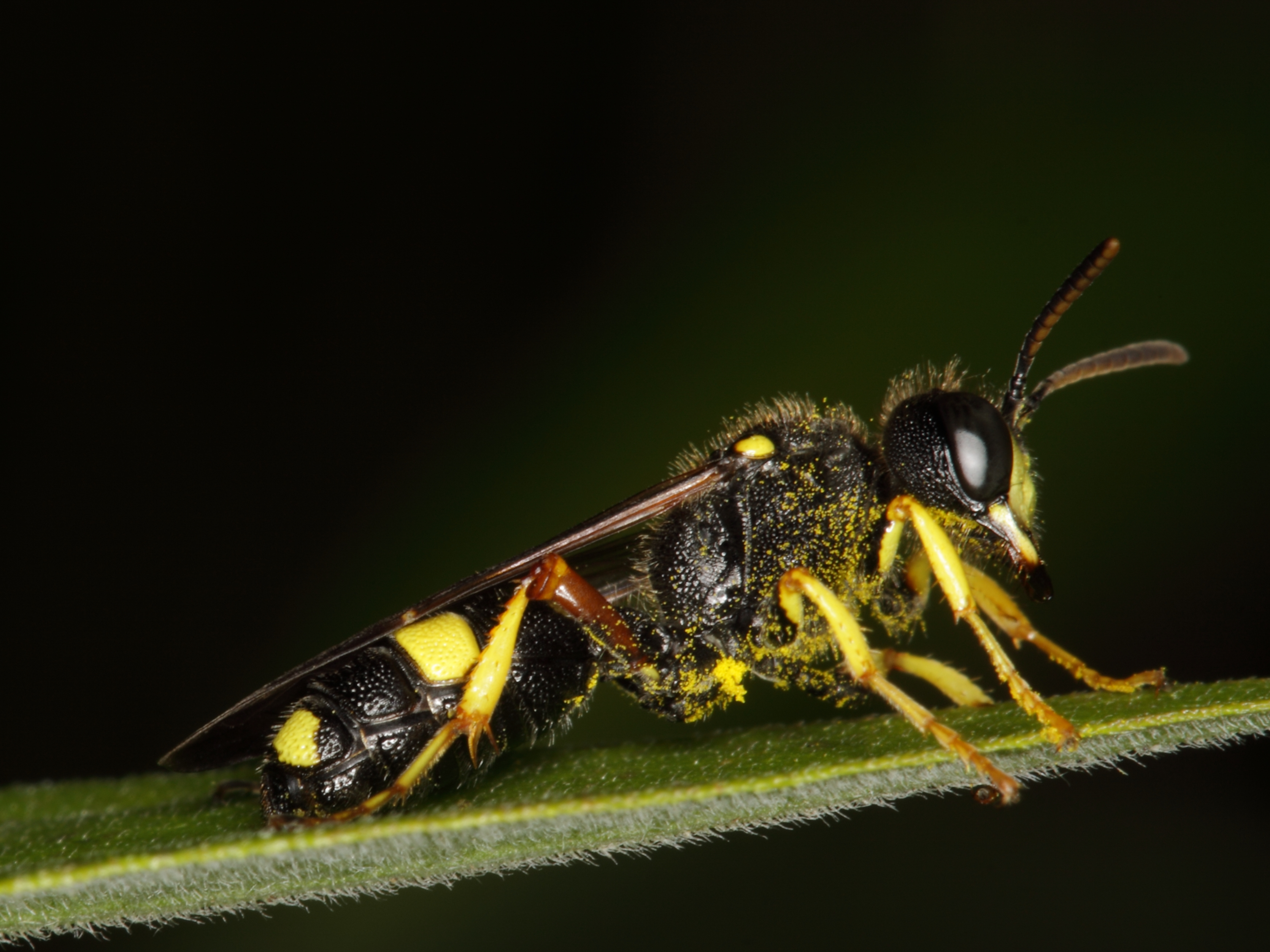
- Cerceris rybyensis

Scientific classification
- Kingdom: Animalia
- Phylum: Arthropoda
- Class: Insecta
- Order: Hymenoptera
- Family: Philanthidae
- Tribe: Cercerini
- Genus: Cerceris; Latreille, 1802

Type species
- Cerceris rybyensis (Linnaeus, 1771)

Diversity
- 876

= Cerceris =

Genus of wasps

Cerceris is a genus of wasps in the family Philanthidae. It is the largest genus in the family, with 876 described species and 169 subspecies. The genus has a cosmopolitan distribution, with species on every continent.

The adult female Cerceris wasp generally digs a nest in the soil and provisions it with living prey items she has paralyzed with venom. The prey are usually beetles, and sometimes bees. Many Cerceris are solitary, but some species share nesting sites or nest communally.

The faces of the females are frequently modified with unusual projections on the clypeus and the clypeal margin which can take the shape of conical bulges to elongated curving "horns". Paralyzed prey are carried in the females' mandibles, which are somewhat elongated and tend to have prominent teeth, often with species-specific shapes. The abdominal segments are also constricted very strongly at the junctures, giving the abdomen a somewhat corrugated, accordion-like appearance.

== Gallery ==
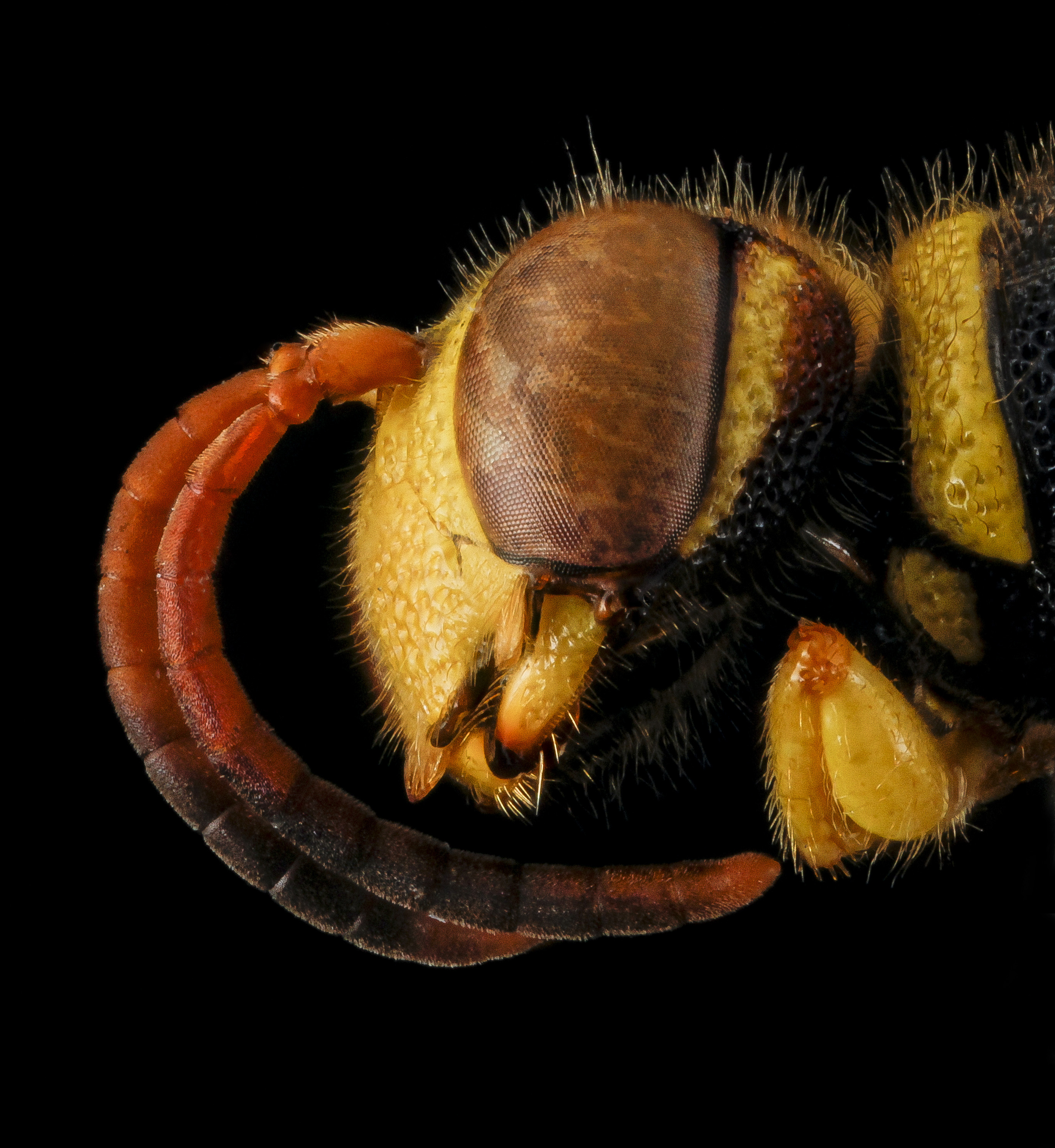
Cerceris triangulata

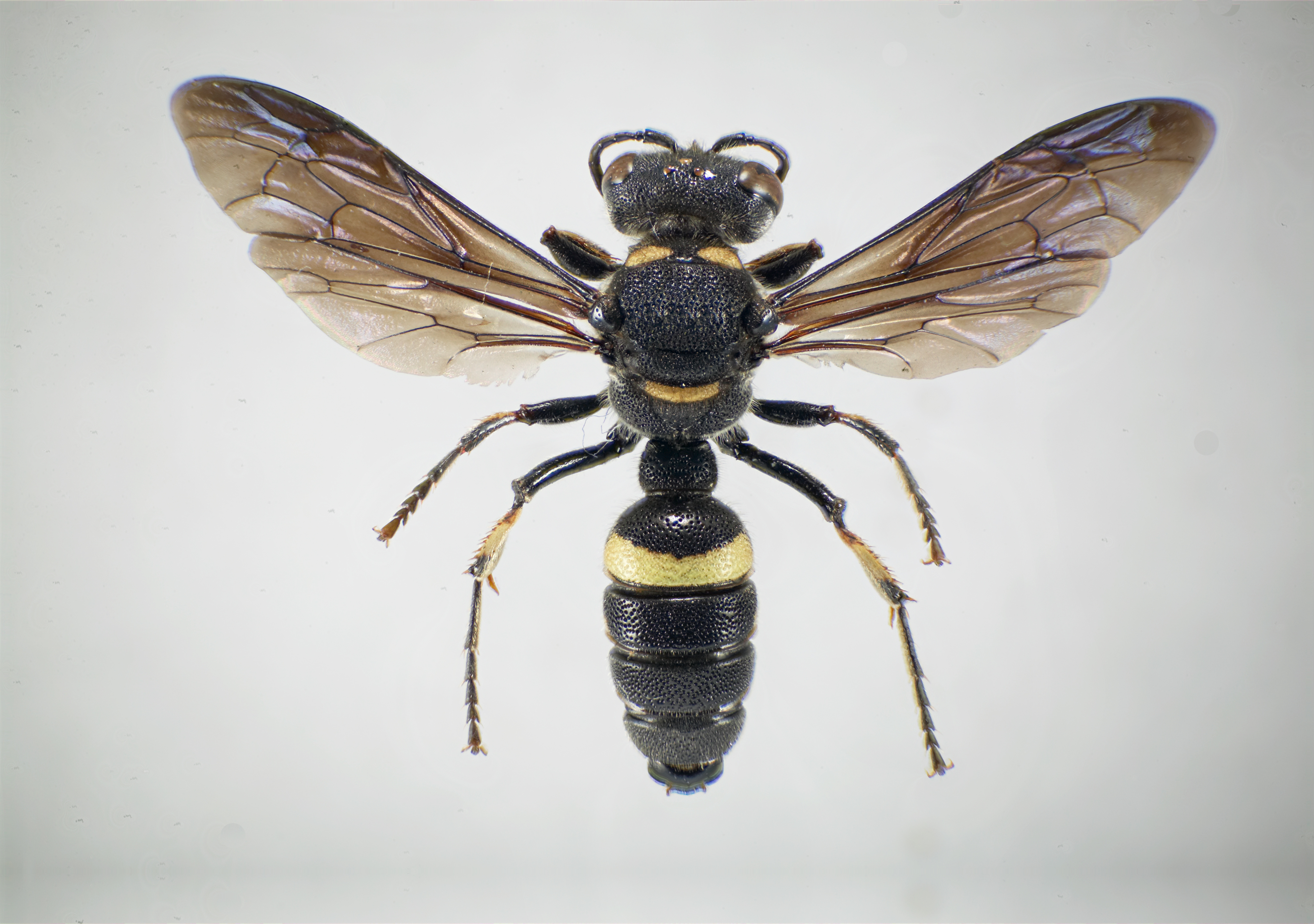
Cerceris fumipennis

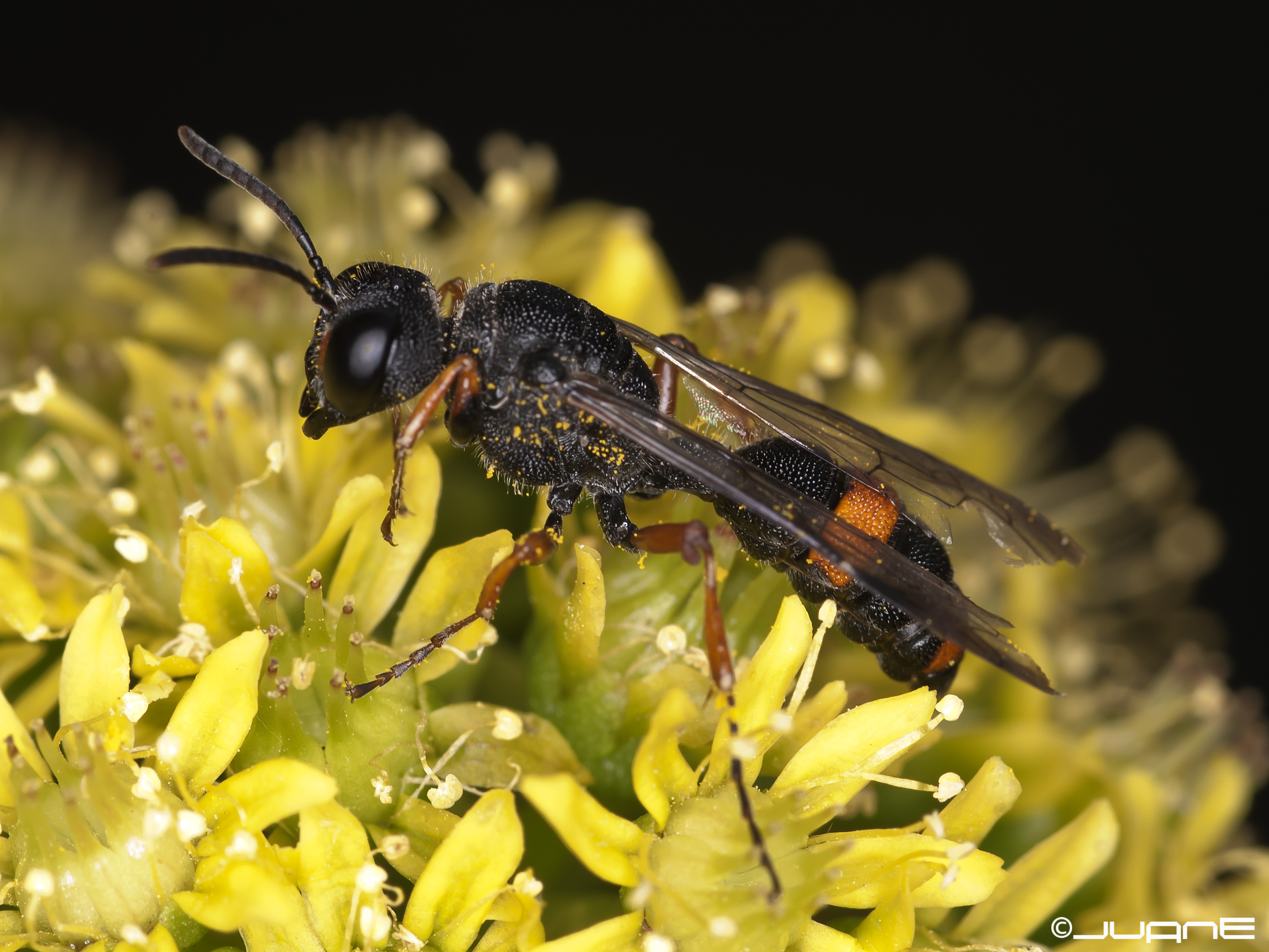
Cerceris concinna

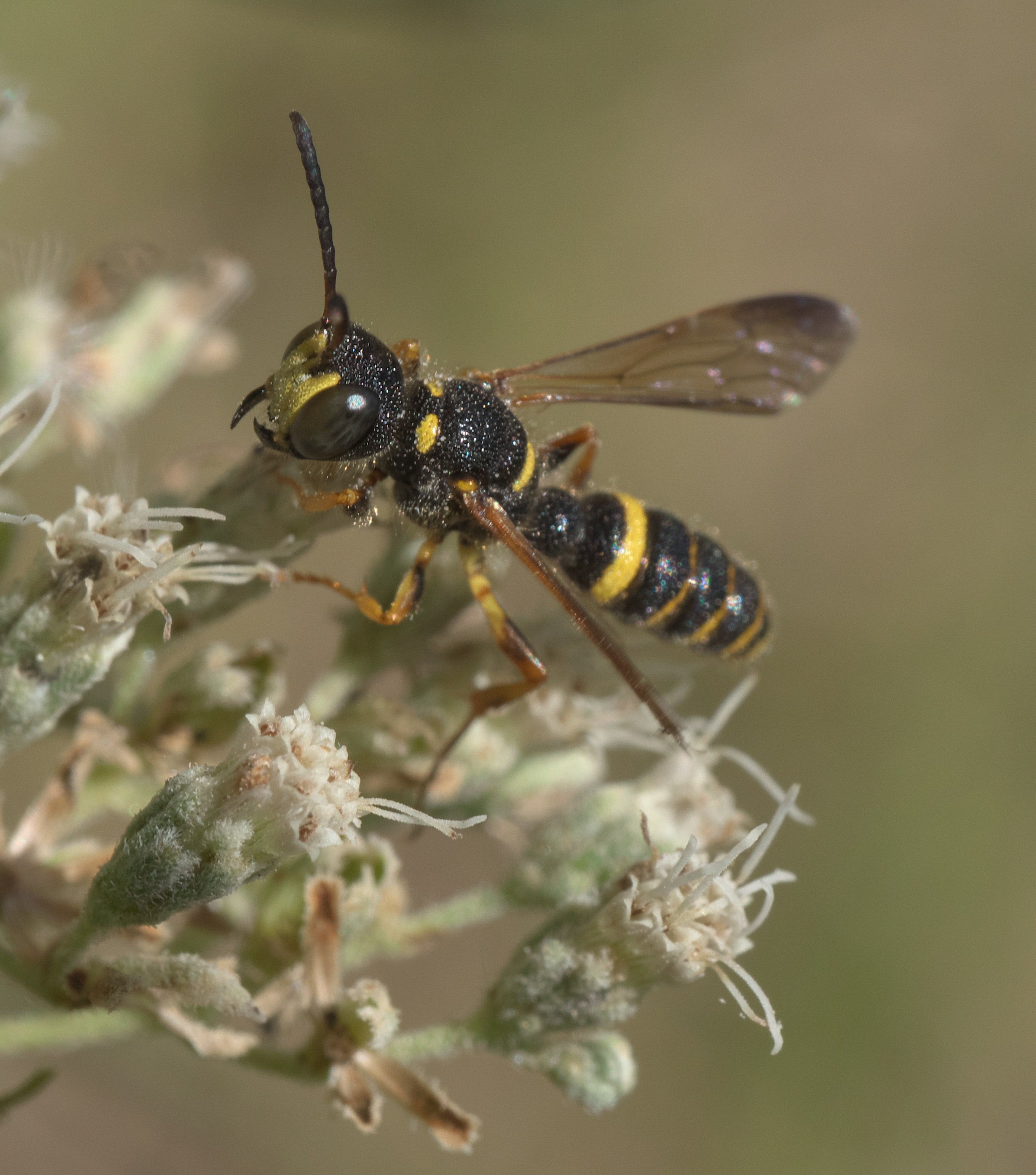

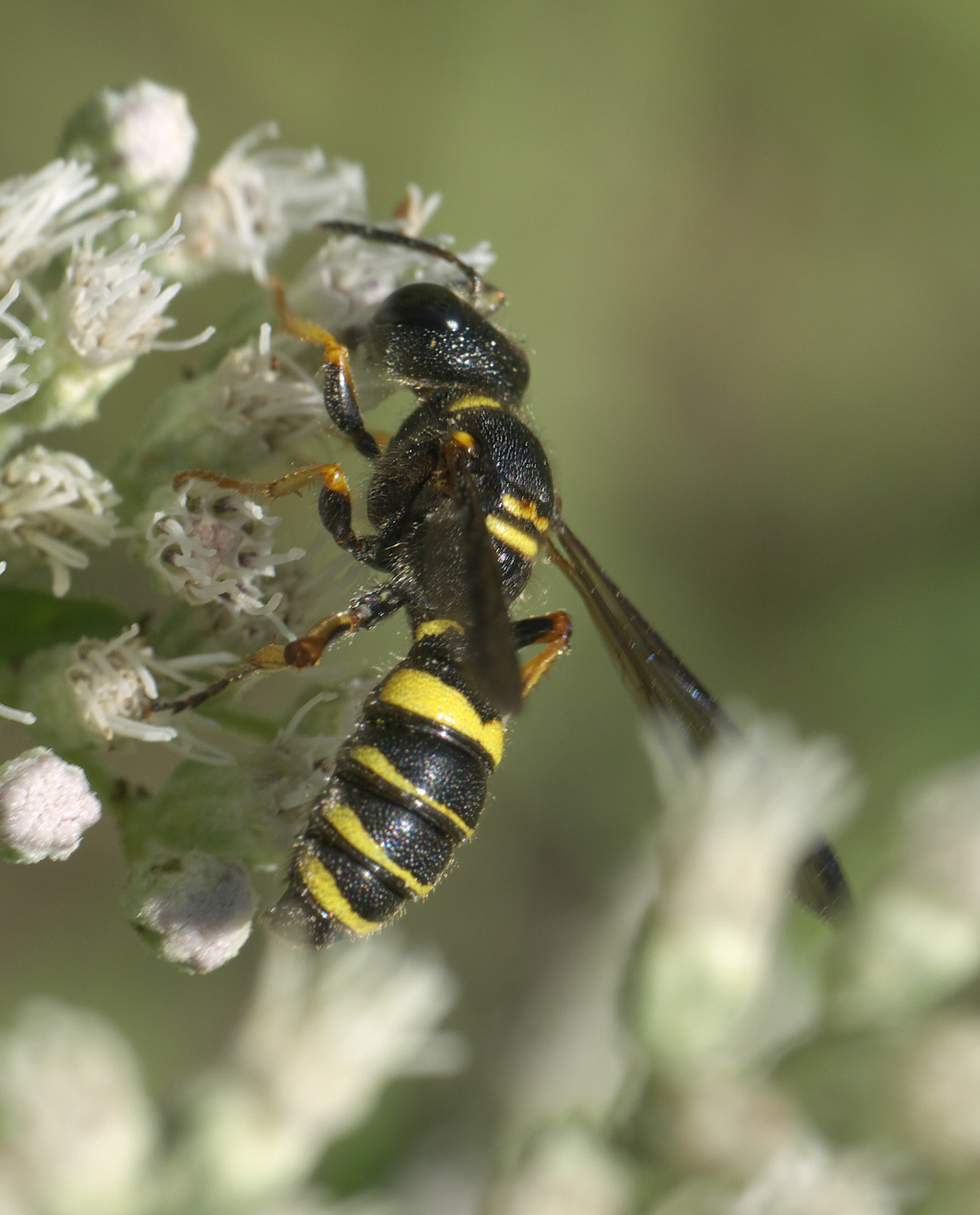

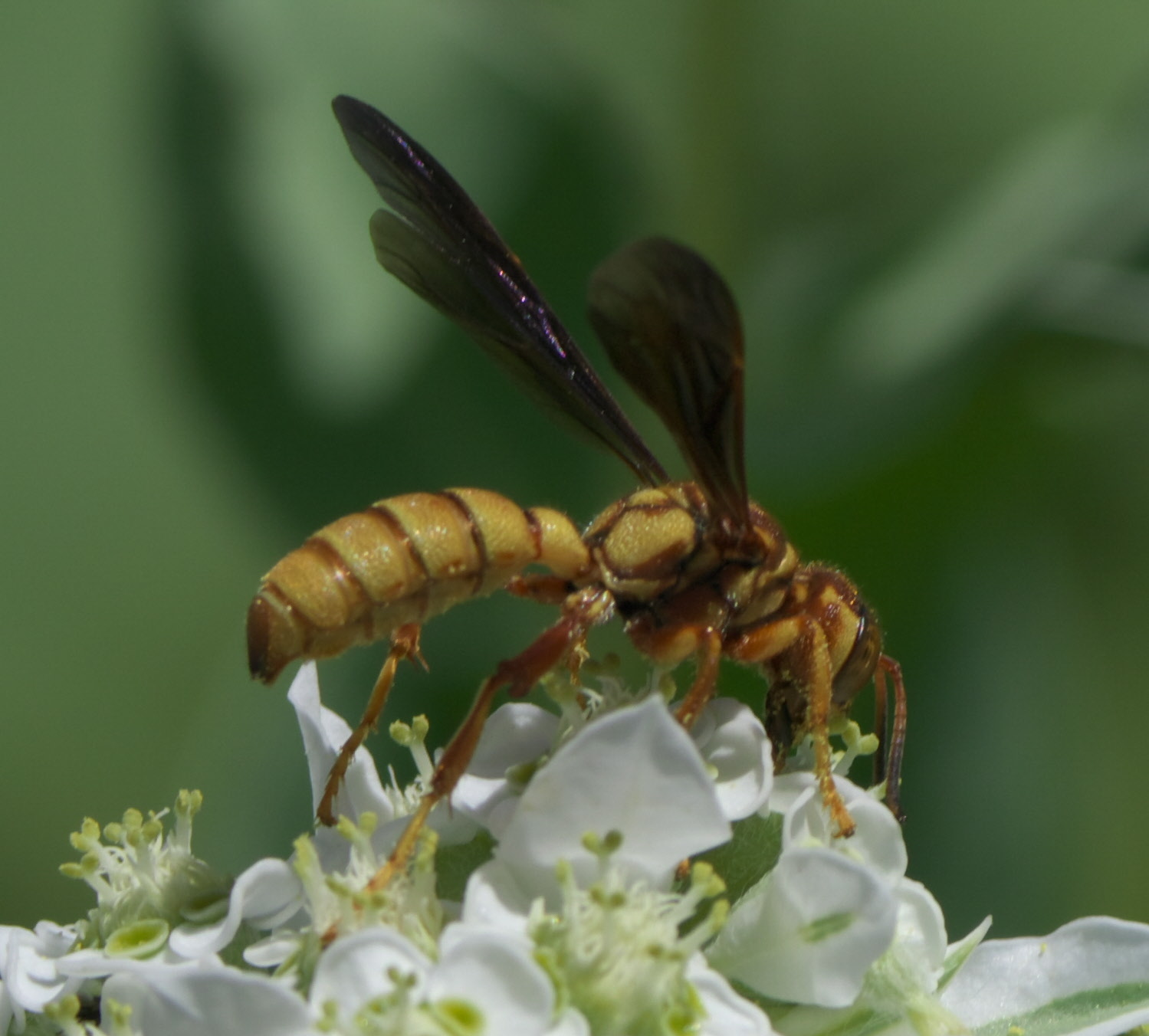

== See also ==
- List of Cerceris species
