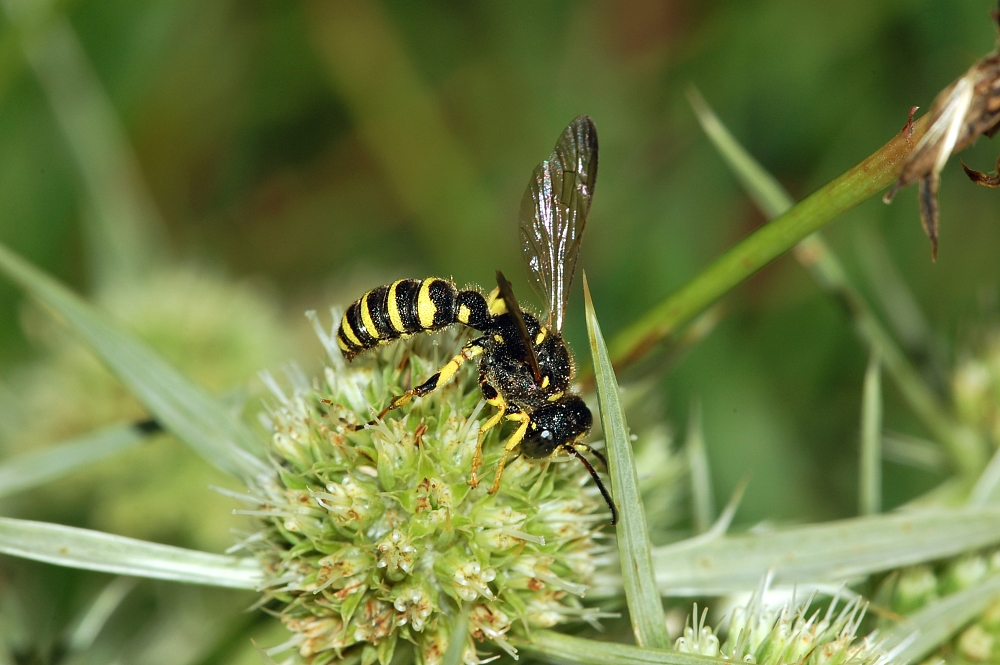
- Cerceris

Scientific classification
- Kingdom: Animalia
- Phylum: Arthropoda
- Class: Insecta
- Order: Hymenoptera
- Superfamily: Apoidea
- Family: Philanthidae

Subfamilies and genera
- Aphilanthopinae: Aphilanthops; Clypeadon; Cercerinae: Cerceris; Eucerceris; Philanthinae: Philanthinus; Philanthus; Trachypus; Pseudoscoliinae: Pseudoscolia

= Philanthidae =

Family of wasps

Philanthidae is one of the largest families of wasp in the superfamily Apoidea, with 1167 species in 8 genera. Most of the species (more than 870) are in the genus Cerceris.

== Taxonomy and phylogeny ==
Historically, this group has frequently been accorded family status. Later interpretations include status as a subfamily of a broadly defined Sphecidae or Crabronidae. Subsequent revision of the superfamily Apoidea has elevated the group back to family status.

== Behavior ==
The family consists of solitary, predatory wasps, each genus having its own distinct and consistent prey preferences. The adult females dig tunnels in the ground for nesting.

As with all other apoid wasps, the larvae are carnivorous; females hunt for prey on which to lays their eggs, mass provisioning the nest cells with paralyzed, living prey that the larva feeds upon after it hatches from the egg, as seen in the species Philanthus gibbosus.
