= List of Philanthus species =

This is a list of 137 species in the genus Philanthus, beewolves.

== Philanthus species ==
- Philanthus adamsoni Arnold, 1952^{i c g}
- Philanthus albopictus Taschenberg, 1880^{i c g}
- Philanthus albopilosus Cresson, 1865^{i c g}
- Philanthus amabilis Arnold, 1946^{i c g}
- Philanthus ammochrysus W. Schulz, 1905^{i c g}
- Philanthus arizonicus R. Bohart, 1972^{i c g}
- Philanthus arnoldi Berland, 1936^{i c g}
- Philanthus asmarensis Giordani Soika, 1939^{i c g}
- Philanthus avidus Bingham, 1896^{i c g}
- Philanthus banabacoa Alayo Dalmau, 1968^{i c g}
- Philanthus barbatus F. Smith, 1856^{i c g}
- Philanthus barbiger Mickel, 1916^{i c g}
- Philanthus basalis F. Smith, 1856^{i c g}
- Philanthus basilaris Cresson, 1880^{i c g}
- Philanthus basilewskyi Leclercq, 1955^{i c g}
- Philanthus bicinctus (Mickel, 1916)^{i c g b} (bumble bee wolf)
- Philanthus bilineatus Gravenhorst, 1807^{i c g}
- Philanthus bilunatus Cresson, 1865^{i c g b}
- Philanthus bimacula de Saussure, 1891^{i c g}
- Philanthus boharti G. Ferguson, 1983^{i c g}
- Philanthus bredoi Arnold, 1946^{i c g}
- Philanthus brevicornis Guichard, 1994^{i c g}
- Philanthus bucephalus F. Smith, 1856^{i c}
- Philanthus camerunensis Tullgren, 1904^{i c g}
- Philanthus capensis Dahlbom, 1845^{i c g}
- Philanthus coarctatus Spinola, 1839^{i c}
- Philanthus coronatus (Thunberg, 1784)^{i c g}
- Philanthus crabroniformis F. Smith, 1856^{i c g b}
- Philanthus crotoniphilus Viereck and Cockerell, 1904^{i c g}
- Philanthus curvimaculatus (Cameron, 1910)^{i c g}
- Philanthus decemmaculatus Eversmann, 1849^{i c g}
- Philanthus dentatus Cameron, 1902^{i c g}
- Philanthus depredator F. Smith, 1856^{i c g}
- Philanthus desertorum (F. Morawitz, 1890)^{i c g}
- Philanthus dichrous Kohl, 1894^{i c g}
- Philanthus dimidiatus Klug, 1845^{i c g}
- Philanthus dufouri Lucas, 1849^{c g}
- Philanthus dufourii Lucas, 1849^{i}
- Philanthus elegantissimus Dalla Torre, 1897^{i c g}
- Philanthus femoralis Arnold, 1946^{i c g}
- Philanthus flagellarius R. Turner, 1918^{i c g}
- Philanthus flavipes Arnold, 1949^{i c g}
- Philanthus fossulatus R. Turner, 1918^{i c g}
- Philanthus foveatus Arnold, 1933^{i c g}
- Philanthus fuscipennis Guérin-Méneville, 1844^{i c g}
- Philanthus genalis Kohl, 1891^{i c g}
- Philanthus gibbosus (Fabricius, 1775)^{i c g b}
- Philanthus glaber Kohl, 1891^{i c g}
- Philanthus gloriosus Cresson, 1865^{i c g}
- Philanthus gwaaiensis Arnold, 1929^{i c g}
- Philanthus hellmanni (Eversmann, 1849)^{i c g}
- Philanthus histrio Fabricius, 1804^{i c g}
- Philanthus impatiens Kohl, 1891^{i c g}
- Philanthus inversus Patton, 1879^{i c g}
- Philanthus kaszabi Tsuneki, 1971^{i c g}
- Philanthus kohlii F. Morawitz, 1890^{i c g}
- Philanthus kokandicus Radoszkowski, 1877^{i c g}
- Philanthus komarowi F. Morawitz, 1890^{i c g}
- Philanthus laticeps Arnold, 1925^{i c g}
- Philanthus lepidus Cresson, 1865^{i c g b}
- Philanthus levini R. Bohart, 1972^{i c g}
- Philanthus limatus Bingham, 1909^{i c g}
- Philanthus lingyuanensis Yasumatsu, 1935^{i c g}
- Philanthus loeflingi Dahlbom, 1845^{i c g}
- Philanthus madagascariensis Brèthes, 1910^{i c g}
- Philanthus major Kohl, 1891^{i c g}
- Philanthus melanderi Arnold, 1925^{i c g}
- Philanthus michelbacheri R. Bohart, 1972^{i c g}
- Philanthus minor Kohl, 1891^{i c g}
- Philanthus mongolicus F. Morawitz, 1889^{i c g}
- Philanthus multimaculatus Cameron, 1891^{i c g b}
- Philanthus namaqua Arnold, 1925^{i c g}
- Philanthus nasalis R. Bohart, 1972^{i c g b}
- Philanthus natalensis Arnold, 1925^{i c g}
- Philanthus neomexicanus Strandtmann, 1946^{i c g}
- Philanthus nepalensis Bingham, 1908^{i c g}
- Philanthus nigritus Gravenhorst, 1807^{i c g}
- Philanthus nigrohirtus R. Turner, 1918^{i c g}
- Philanthus nitidus Magretti, 1884^{i c g}
- Philanthus nobilis Kohl, 1891^{i c g}
- Philanthus notatulus F. Smith, 1862^{i c g}
- Philanthus nursei (Bingham, 1898)^{i c g}
- Philanthus occidentalis Strandtmann, 1946^{i c g}
- Philanthus oraniensis Arnold, 1925^{i c g}
- Philanthus ordinarius Bingham, 1896^{i c g}
- Philanthus pacificus Cresson, 1880^{i c g b}
- Philanthus pallidus Klug, 1845^{i c g}
- Philanthus parkeri G. Ferguson, 1983^{i c g}
- Philanthus pilifrons Cameron, 1908^{i c g}
- Philanthus politus Say, 1824^{i c g b}
- Philanthus promontorii Arnold, 1925^{i c g}
- Philanthus psyche Dunning, 1896^{i c g}
- Philanthus pulchellus Spinola, 1843^{i c g}
- Philanthus pulcher Dalla Torre, 1897^{i c g}
- Philanthus pulcherrimus F. Smith, 1856^{i c g}
- Philanthus punjabensis Nurse, 1902^{i c g}
- Philanthus radamae Arnold, 1945^{i c g}
- Philanthus ramakrishnae R. Turner, 1918^{i c g}
- Philanthus reinigi Bischoff, 1930^{i c g}
- Philanthus rubidus Arnold, 1946^{i c g}
- Philanthus rubriventris Kazenas, 1970^{i c g}
- Philanthus rugosifrons Arnold, 1949^{i c g}
- Philanthus rugosus Kohl, 1891^{i c g}
- Philanthus rutilus Spinola, 1839^{i c g}
- Philanthus sanbornii Cresson, 1865^{i c g b}
- Philanthus schulthessi Maidl, 1924^{i c g}
- Philanthus schusteri R. Bohart, 1972^{i c g}
- Philanthus scrutator Nurse, 1902^{i c g}
- Philanthus sculpturatus Gayubo, 1991^{i c g}
- Philanthus serrulatae Dunning, 1898^{i c g}
- Philanthus sicarius F. Smith, 1856^{i c g}
- Philanthus soikai de Beaumont, 1961^{i c g}
- Philanthus solivagus Say, 1837^{i c g b}
- Philanthus sparsipunctatus Arnold, 1946^{i c g}
- Philanthus spiniger Thunberg, 1815^{i c g}
- Philanthus stecki W. Schulz, 1906^{i c g}
- Philanthus strigulosus R. Turner, 1918^{i c g}
- Philanthus stygius Gerstäcker, 1858^{i c g}
- Philanthus subconcolor (Bingham, 1898)^{i c g}
- Philanthus sulphureus F. Smith, 1856^{i c g}
- Philanthus sumptuosus R. Turner, 1917^{i c g}
- Philanthus taantes Gribodo, 1895^{i c g}
- Philanthus tarsatus H. Smith, 1908^{i c g}
- Philanthus tenellus Arnold, 1925^{i c g}
- Philanthus triangulum (Fabricius, 1775)^{i c g}
- Philanthus tricinctus Gimmerthal, 1836^{i c g}
- Philanthus tricolor Fairmaire, 1858^{i c g}
- Philanthus turneri Arnold, 1925^{i c g}
- Philanthus variegatus Spinola, 1839^{i c g}
- Philanthus variolosus Arnold, 1932^{i c g}
- Philanthus ventilabris Fabricius, 1798^{i c g b}
- Philanthus ventralis (Mickel, 1918)^{i c g}
- Philanthus venustus (Rossi, 1790)^{i c g}
- Philanthus walteri Kohl, 1891^{i c g}
- Philanthus werneri Maidl, 1933^{i c g}
- Philanthus yerburyi Bingham, 1898^{i c g}
- Philanthus zebratus Cresson, 1880^{i c g}

Data sources: i = ITIS, c = Catalogue of Life, g = GBIF, b = Bugguide.net
