= P. lepidus =

P. lepidus may refer to:

- Philanthus lepidus, a wasp species in the genus Philanthus
- Pisenor lepidus, a spider species in the genus Pisenor
- Poecilus lepidus, a beetle species in the genus Poecilus
- Proprioseiopsis lepidus, a mite species in the genus Proprioseiopsis

== See also ==
- Lepidus (disambiguation)
