= Pacific burrowing wasp =

Pacific burrowing wasp can refer to:

- Philanthus multimaculatus, found from British Columbia and Alberta to Zacatecas and San Luis Potosi
- Philanthus pacificus, found from British Columbia and Wyoming to Baja California and Sonora
