= Philanthus coarctatus raptor =

Scientific classification
- Domain: Eukaryota
- Kingdom: Animalia
- Phylum: Arthropoda
- Class: Insecta
- Order: Hymenoptera
- Family: Philanthidae
- Genus: Philanthus
- Species: P. coarctatus
- Subspecies: P. c. raptor

Trinomial name
- Philanthus coarctatus raptor Lepeletier, 1845

Synonyms
- Philanthus marocanus Shestakov, 1933

Subspecies of wasp

Philanthus coarctatus raptor is a subspecies of bee-hunting wasp, or beewolf, from Algeria and other parts of Northern Africa.
