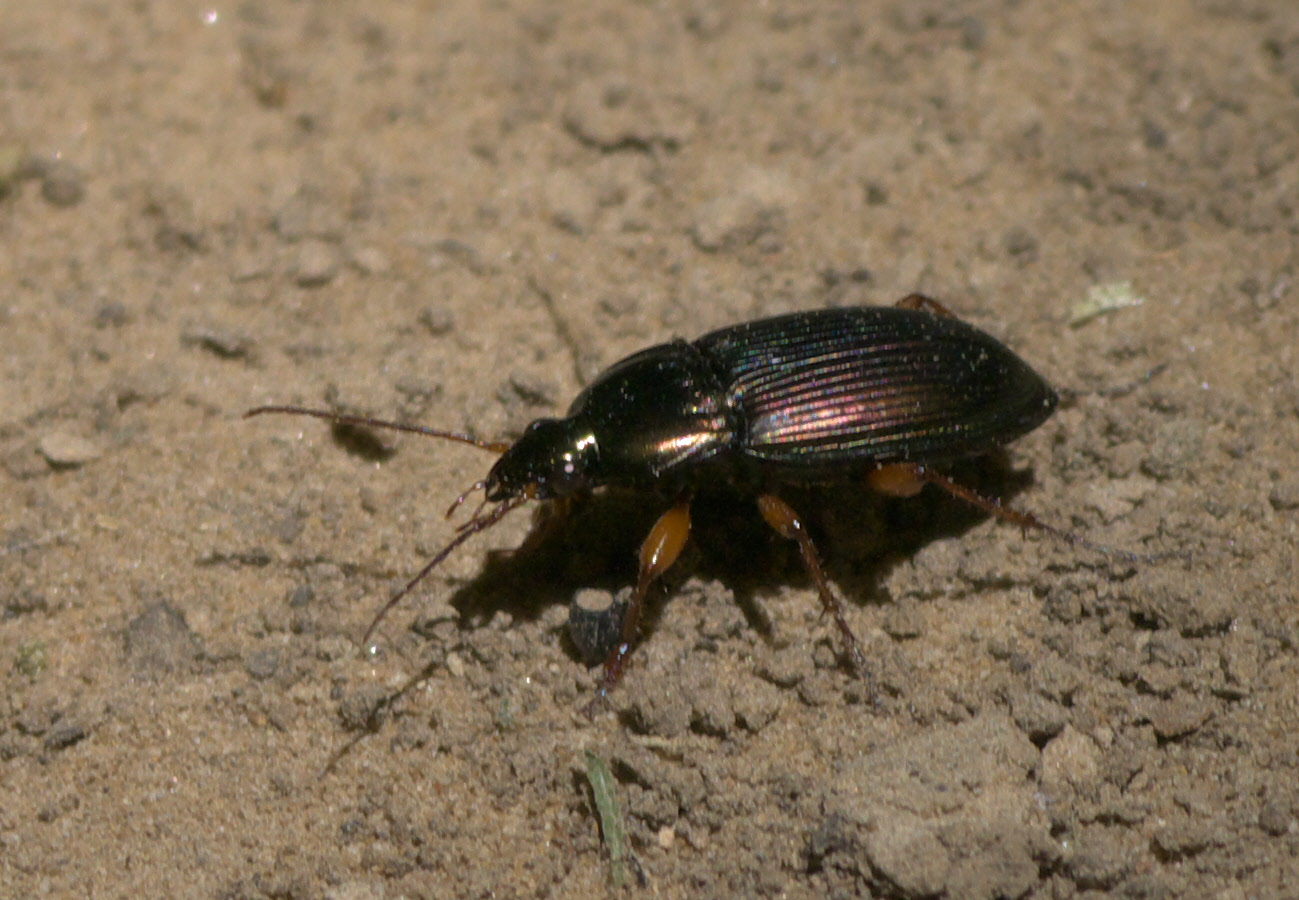

Scientific classification
- Domain: Eukaryota
- Kingdom: Animalia
- Phylum: Arthropoda
- Class: Insecta
- Order: Coleoptera
- Suborder: Adephaga
- Family: Carabidae
- Genus: Poecilus
- Species: P. lucublandus

Binomial name
- Poecilus lucublandus (Say, 1823)

Synonyms
- Poecilus lucublandus acomanus Casey, 1924; Poecilus lucublandus louisinus Casey, 1924; Pterostichus acomanus (Casey, 1924)

= Poecilus lucublandus =

Species of beetle

Poecilus lucublandus is a species of woodland ground beetle in the family Carabidae. It is found in North America.

== Subspecies ==
These two subspecies belong to the species Poecilus lucublandus:

- Poecilus lucublandus lucublandus
- Poecilus lucublandus manhattanis Casey
