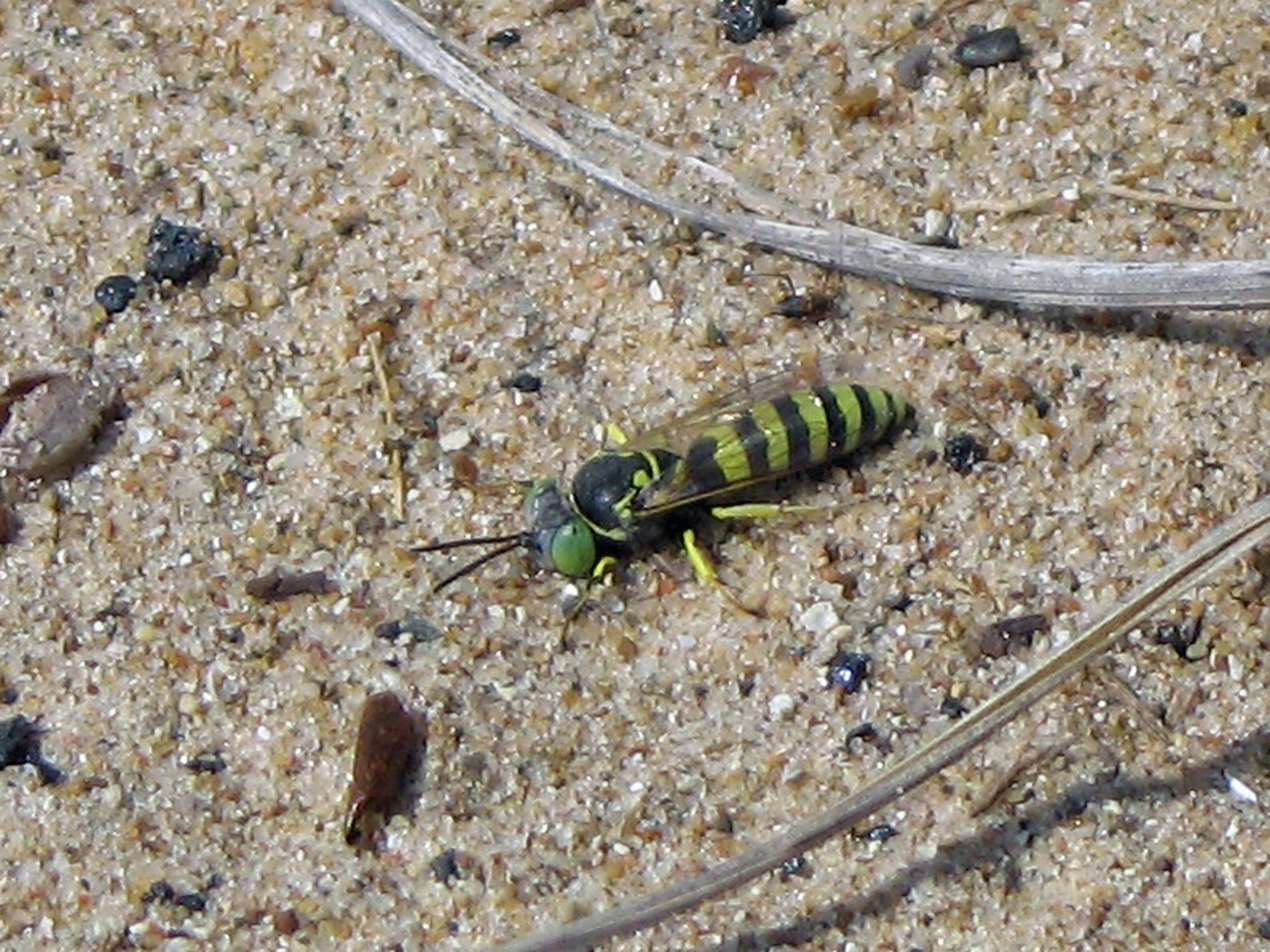

Scientific classification
- Domain: Eukaryota
- Kingdom: Animalia
- Phylum: Arthropoda
- Class: Insecta
- Order: Hymenoptera
- Family: Philanthidae
- Genus: Philanthus
- Species: P. ventilabris

Binomial name
- Philanthus ventilabris Fabricius, 1798

Synonyms
- Simblephilus vertilabris (Fabricius, 1798); Pseudanthophilus vertilabris (Fabricius, 1798); Pseudanthophilus frontalis (Cresson, 1865); Philanthus frontalis Cresson, 1865; Liris rugosus Provancher, 1895; Anthophilus vertilabris (Fabricius, 1798)

= Philanthus ventilabris =

Species of wasp

Philanthus ventilabris is a species of bee-hunting wasp (or "beewolf") found throughout North America. It is a solitary species.
