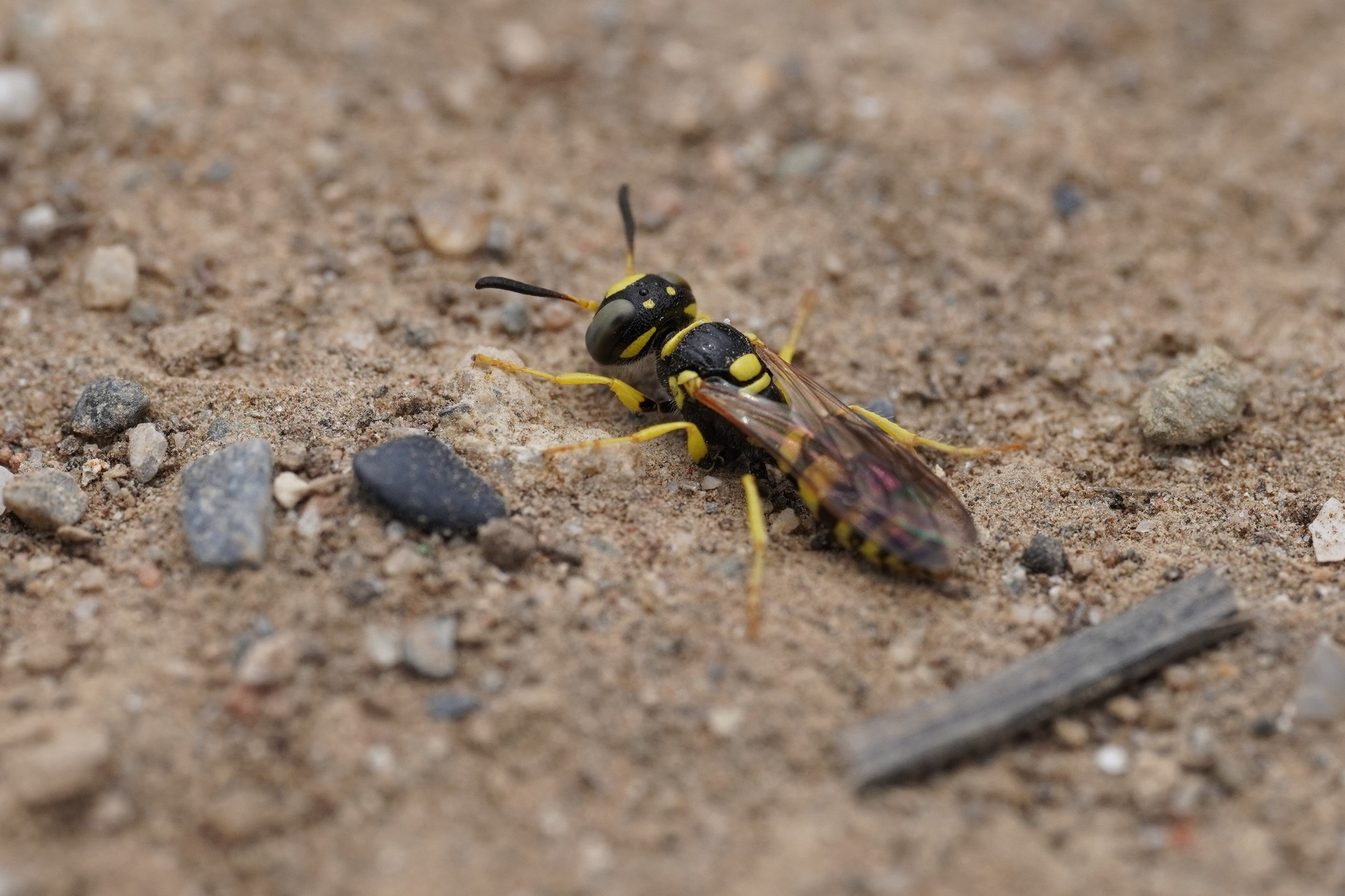

Scientific classification
- Kingdom: Animalia
- Phylum: Arthropoda
- Class: Insecta
- Order: Hymenoptera
- Family: Philanthidae
- Genus: Philanthus
- Species: P. pulchellus

Binomial name
- Philanthus pulchellus Spinola, 1842

Synonyms
- Philanthus andalusiacus (Shestakov in Nadig, 1933); Philanthus sieboldti Dahlbom, 1845; Philanthus venustus subsp. raptor (Kohl, 1888)

= Philanthus pulchellus =

Species of wasp

Philanthus pulchellus is a species of bee-hunting wasp (or "beewolf") of the Iberian Peninsula (Spain, Portugal, and France). Males are territorial and establish territories in nesting areas of females, or in the case of smaller males that are unable to do so, nearby. Females are generalist predators of bees and wasps, including conspecifics, and store the prey in their underground nest.
