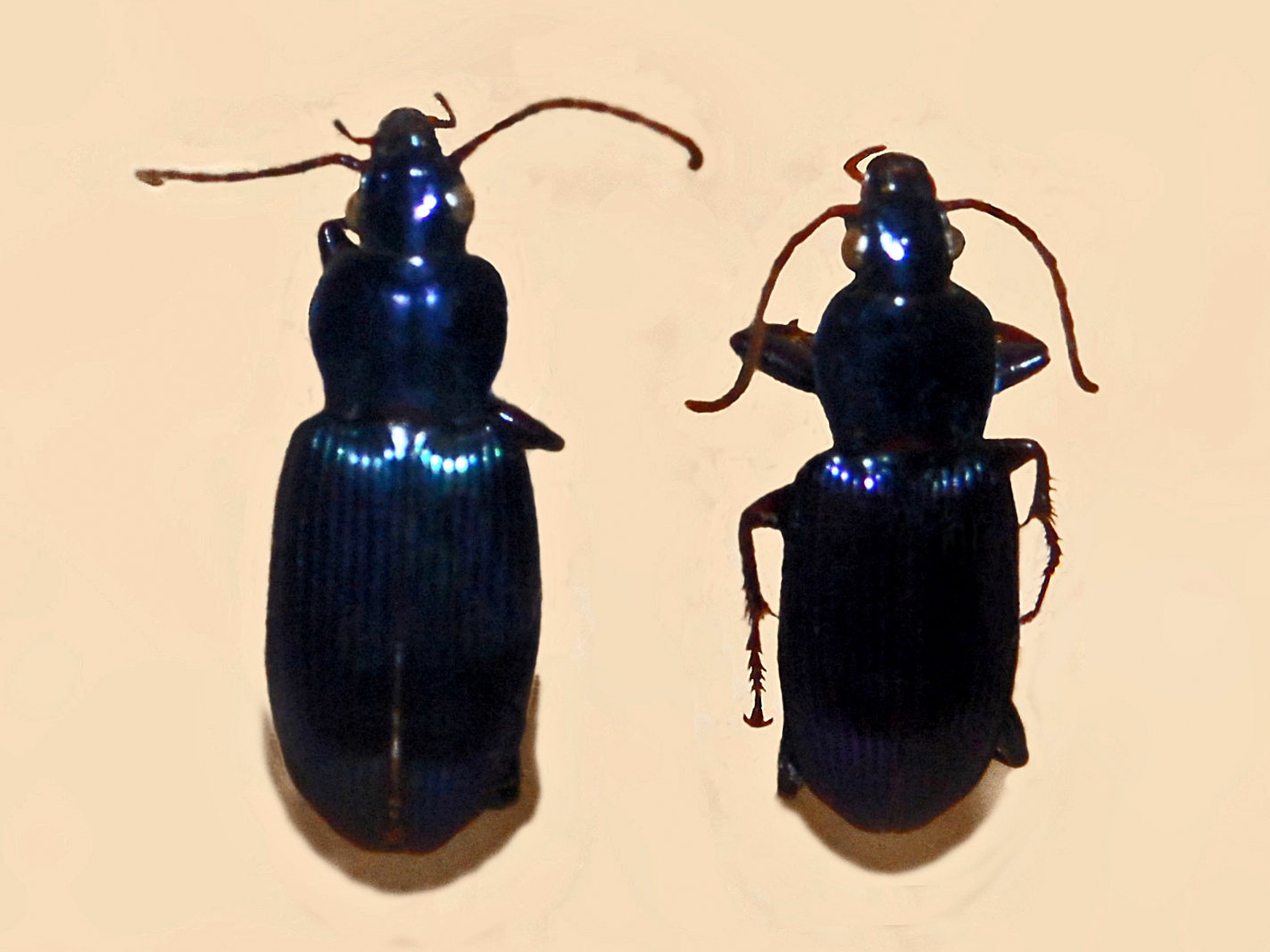
- Poecilus purpurascens from Tunis

Scientific classification
- Domain: Eukaryota
- Kingdom: Animalia
- Phylum: Arthropoda
- Class: Insecta
- Order: Coleoptera
- Suborder: Adephaga
- Family: Carabidae
- Genus: Poecilus
- Species: P. purpurascens

Binomial name
- Poecilus purpurascens (Dejean, 1828)

Synonyms
- Feronia purpurascens Dejean, 1828; Pterostichus purpurascens (Dejean, 1828)

= Poecilus purpurascens =

Species of beetle

Poecilus purpurascens is a species of ground beetle belonging to the family Carabidae. This species can be found in Southern Europe (Portugal, Spain, France, Italy, Greece) and in North Africa (Morocco, Algeria, Tunisia).
