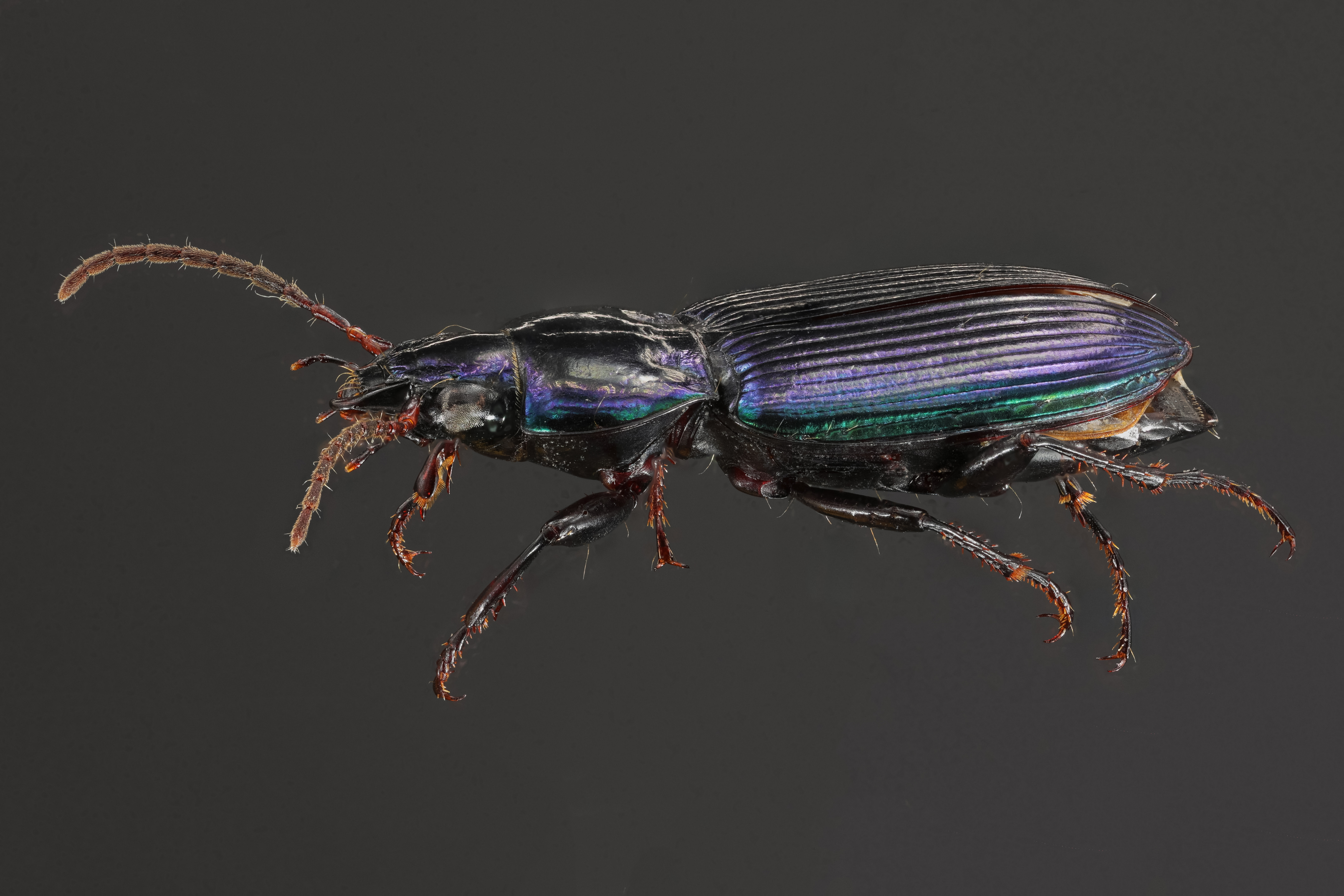

Scientific classification
- Kingdom: Animalia
- Phylum: Arthropoda
- Class: Insecta
- Order: Coleoptera
- Suborder: Adephaga
- Family: Carabidae
- Genus: Poecilus
- Species: P. scitulus

Binomial name
- Poecilus scitulus LeConte, 1846

= Poecilus scitulus =

Species of beetle

Poecilus scitulus is a species of woodland ground beetle in the family Carabidae. It is found in Central America and North America.
