= Philanthus politus =

Scientific classification
- Domain: Eukaryota
- Kingdom: Animalia
- Phylum: Arthropoda
- Class: Insecta
- Order: Hymenoptera
- Family: Philanthidae
- Genus: Philanthus
- Species: P. politus

Binomial name
- Philanthus politus Say, 1824

Synonyms
- Philanthus texanus Banks, 1913; Philanthus pulcher (Banks, 1921); Philanthus dubius Cresson, 1865; Anthophilus politus (Say, 1824); Anthophilus dubius (Cresson, 1865)

Species of wasp

Philanthus politus is a white-striped species of bee-hunting wasp (or "beewolf").
