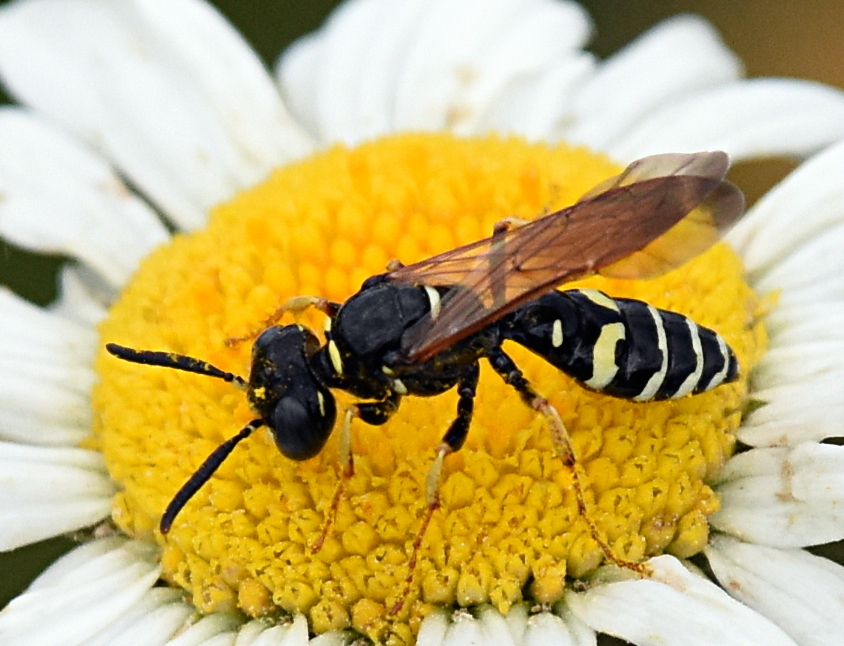

Scientific classification
- Domain: Eukaryota
- Kingdom: Animalia
- Phylum: Arthropoda
- Class: Insecta
- Order: Hymenoptera
- Family: Philanthidae
- Genus: Philanthus
- Species: P. bilunatus

Binomial name
- Philanthus bilunatus Cresson, 1865

Synonyms
- Anthophilus scelestus (Cresson, 1880); Philanthus assimilis Banks, 1915; Philanthus consimilis Banks, 1923; Philanthus scelestus Cresson, 1880

= Philanthus bilunatus =

Species of wasp

Philanthus bilunatus is a species of wasp in the family Philanthidae. It is found in North America.
