= Philanthus solivagus =

Scientific classification
- Domain: Eukaryota
- Kingdom: Animalia
- Phylum: Arthropoda
- Class: Insecta
- Order: Hymenoptera
- Family: Philanthidae
- Genus: Philanthus
- Species: P. solivagus

Binomial name
- Philanthus solivagus Say, 1837

Species of wasp

Philanthus solivagus is a species of wasp in the family Philanthidae. It is found in North America.
