= Poecilus cursitor =

Scientific classification
- Domain: Eukaryota
- Kingdom: Animalia
- Phylum: Arthropoda
- Class: Insecta
- Order: Coleoptera
- Suborder: Adephaga
- Family: Carabidae
- Genus: Poecilus
- Species: P. cursitor

Binomial name
- Poecilus cursitor LeConte, 1853

Species of beetle

Poecilus cursitor is a species of woodland ground beetle in the family Carabidae. It is found in North America.
