= Philanthus sanbornii =

Scientific classification
- Kingdom: Animalia
- Phylum: Arthropoda
- Clade: Pancrustacea
- Class: Insecta
- Order: Hymenoptera
- Family: Philanthidae
- Genus: Philanthus
- Species: P. sanbornii

Binomial name
- Philanthus sanbornii Cresson, 1865

Synonyms
- Ococletes scutellaris (Cresson, 1880); Philanthus eurynome W. Fox, 1890; Philanthus magdalenae Strandtmann, 1946; Philanthus scutellaris Cresson, 1880; Philanthus trumani Dunning, 1897

Species of wasp

Philanthus sanbornii is a species of wasp in the family Philanthidae. It is found in North America.

Males measure 12–14 mm (0.47–0.55 in) and females 14–17 mm (0.55–0.67 in).
