= Poecilus baeticus =

Scientific classification
- Kingdom: Animalia
- Phylum: Arthropoda
- Class: Insecta
- Order: Coleoptera
- Suborder: Adephaga
- Family: Carabidae
- Subfamily: Pterostichinae
- Tribe: Pterostichini
- Genus: Poecilus
- Species: P. baeticus

Binomial name
- Poecilus baeticus (Rambur, 1838)

Synonyms
- Brachinus baeticus Rambur, 1838; Brachinus matchai Jedlicka, 1924; Brachinus rugipleuris Reitter, 1919

Species of beetle

Poecilus baeticus is a species of ground beetle in the family Carabidae. It is found in Spain and Morocco.

== Subspecies ==
These two subspecies belong to the species Poecilus baeticus:

- Poecilus baeticus baeticus Rambur, 1838 (Spain)
- Poecilus baeticus gharbensis (Alluaud, 1927) (Morocco)
