= Philanthus gloriosus =

Scientific classification
- Kingdom: Animalia
- Phylum: Arthropoda
- Clade: Pancrustacea
- Class: Insecta
- Order: Hymenoptera
- Family: Philanthidae
- Genus: Philanthus
- Species: P. gloriosus

Binomial name
- Philanthus gloriosus Cresson, 1865

Synonyms
- Philanthus insignatus Banks, 1913

Species of wasp

Philanthus gloriosus is a species of bee-hunting wasp. It is found west of the 100th meridian in North America, from Medicine Hat, Alberta south across the High Plains and Rocky Mountains to the Mexican states of Chihuahua, Coahuila, Durango, San Luis Potosí, Hidalgo, Mexico City and Puebla.

Males measure 14–16 mm (0.55–0.63 in) and females 16–18 mm (0.63–0.71 in).
