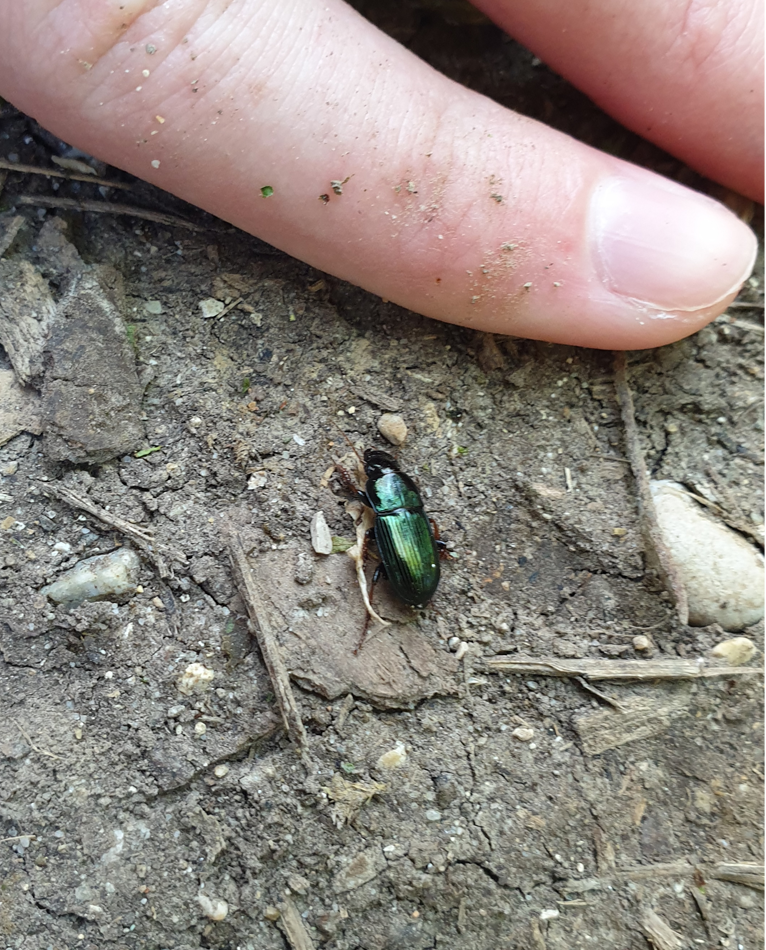
- On forest floor in France

Scientific classification
- Domain: Eukaryota
- Kingdom: Animalia
- Phylum: Arthropoda
- Class: Insecta
- Order: Coleoptera
- Suborder: Adephaga
- Family: Carabidae
- Genus: Poecilus
- Species: P. festivus

Binomial name
- Poecilus festivus Chaudoir, 1868

= Poecilus festivus =

Species of beetle

Poecilus festivus is a species of ground beetle belonging to the family Carabidae.
