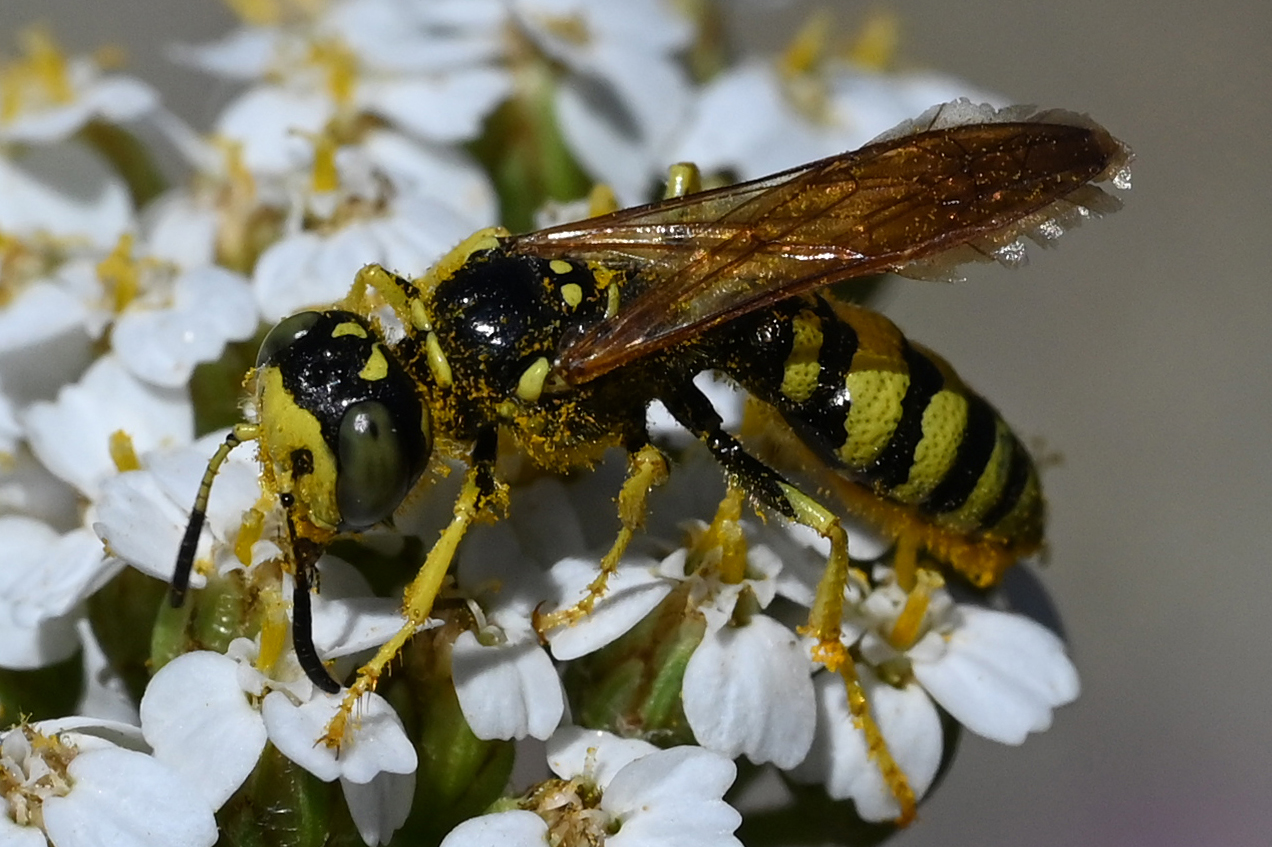

Scientific classification
- Domain: Eukaryota
- Kingdom: Animalia
- Phylum: Arthropoda
- Class: Insecta
- Order: Hymenoptera
- Family: Philanthidae
- Genus: Philanthus
- Species: P. crabroniformis

Binomial name
- Philanthus crabroniformis Smith, 1856

Synonyms
- Philanthus flavifrons Cresson, 1865; Philanthus californicus Cresson, 1879; Philanthus sublimis Cresson, 1879; Liris magnifica Provancher, 1895

= Philanthus crabroniformis =

Species of wasp

Philanthus crabroniformis is a species of bee-hunting wasp (or "beewolf") of North America. The species primarily preys upon Halictidae. They nest in sandy soils.
