= Bumblebeewolf =

Scientific classification
- Domain: Eukaryota
- Kingdom: Animalia
- Phylum: Arthropoda
- Class: Insecta
- Order: Hymenoptera
- Family: Philanthidae
- Genus: Philanthus
- Species: P. bicinctus

Binomial name
- Philanthus bicinctus (Mickel, 1916)

Synonyms
- Ococletes hirticulus Mickel, 1918

Species of wasp

The bumblebeewolf (Philanthus bicinctus) is a species of bee-hunting wasp (or "beewolf") of North America. It makes deep nests in soil. Males are territorial, often perching on grass near the burrow they occupy nocturnally. Females typically occupy a single nest throughout a season, with a maximum of 36 days spent in one burrow.
