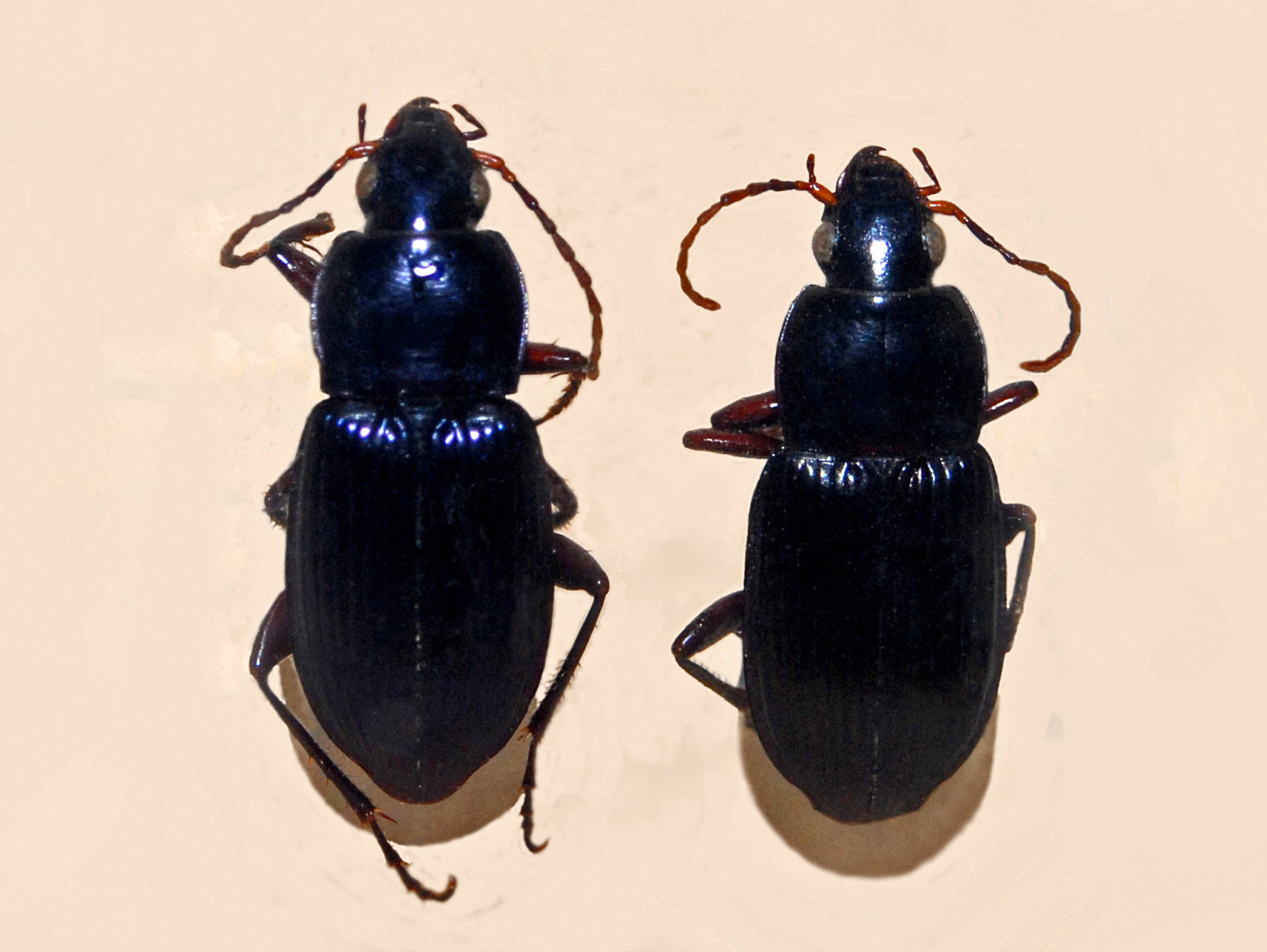
- Poecilus quadricollis from Tunis

Scientific classification
- Kingdom: Animalia
- Phylum: Arthropoda
- Class: Insecta
- Order: Coleoptera
- Suborder: Adephaga
- Family: Carabidae
- Genus: Poecilus
- Species: P. quadricollis

Binomial name
- Poecilus quadricollis (Dejean, 1828)

= Poecilus quadricollis =

Species of beetle

Poecilus quadricollis is a species of ground beetle belonging to the family Carabidae. This species can be found in France, Portugal, Spain and in North Africa.

== References links ==
- Poecilus quadricollis at Fauna Europaea
