= Philanthus nasalis =

Scientific classification
- Domain: Eukaryota
- Kingdom: Animalia
- Phylum: Arthropoda
- Class: Insecta
- Order: Hymenoptera
- Family: Philanthidae
- Genus: Philanthus
- Species: P. nasalis

Binomial name
- Philanthus nasalis Bohart, 1972

Species of wasp

Philanthus nasalis is a species of bee-hunting wasp (or "beewolf") that is endemic to Contra Costa County, California.
