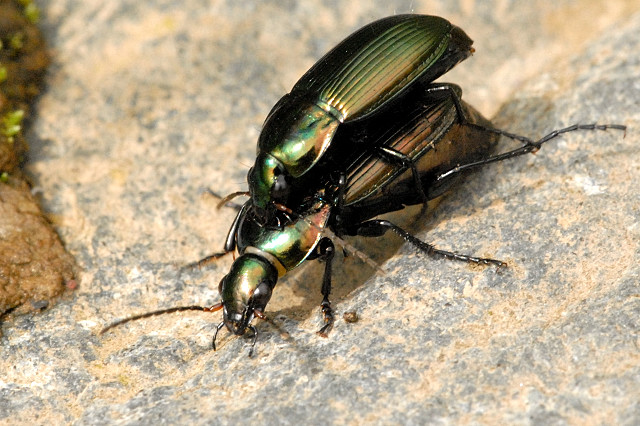

Scientific classification
- Domain: Eukaryota
- Kingdom: Animalia
- Phylum: Arthropoda
- Class: Insecta
- Order: Coleoptera
- Suborder: Adephaga
- Family: Carabidae
- Genus: Poecilus
- Species: P. versicolor

Binomial name
- Poecilus versicolor (Sturm, 1824)

= Poecilus versicolor =

Species of beetle

P. versicolor with prey

Poecilus versicolor is a species of ground beetle native to the Palearctic (including Europe). In Europe, it is found in Albania, Austria, Belarus, Belgium, Bosnia and Herzegovina, Bulgaria, Corsica, Croatia, the Czech Republic, mainland Denmark, Estonia, Finland, mainland France, Germany, Great Britain including the Isle of Man, Hungary, the Republic of Ireland, mainland Italy, Kaliningrad, Latvia, Liechtenstein, Lithuania, Luxembourg, Moldova, Northern Ireland, North Macedonia, mainland Norway, Poland, mainland Portugal, Romania, Russia, Slovakia, Slovenia, mainland Spain, Sweden, Switzerland, the Netherlands, Ukraine and Yugoslavia.
