= Poecilus koyi =

Scientific classification
- Domain: Eukaryota
- Kingdom: Animalia
- Phylum: Arthropoda
- Class: Insecta
- Order: Coleoptera
- Suborder: Adephaga
- Superfamily: Caraboidea
- Family: Carabidae
- Subfamily: Pterostichinae
- Tribe: Pterostichini
- Genus: Poecilus
- Species: P. koyi

Binomial name
- Poecilus koyi Germar, 1823

Synonyms
- Poecilus sericeus von Waldheim, 1824

Species of beetle

Poecilus koyi is a species of ground beetle native to the Palearctic (including Europe).

== Subspecies ==
These 12 subspecies belong to the species Poecilus koyi:

- Poecilus koyi brutius (Straneo, 1935) (Italy)
- Poecilus koyi catalonicus Jeanne, 1981 (France and Spain)
- Poecilus koyi desbrochersi Jeannel, 1942 (France)
- Poecilus koyi dinaricus Apfelbeck, 1904 (Croatia and Bosnia-Herzegovina)
- Poecilus koyi goricianus (G.Müller, 1921) (Italy, Slovenia, and Croatia)
- Poecilus koyi koyi Germar, 1823 (Palearctic)
- Poecilus koyi lossinianus Fairmaire, 1860 (Croatia)
- Poecilus koyi monspessulani (Schatzmayr, 1942) (France)
- Poecilus koyi mosorensis (Jedlicka, 1924) (Croatia)
- Poecilus koyi transpyrenaeus (Breit, 1933) (France and Spain)
- Poecilus koyi viaticus (Dejean, 1828) (Hungary and Italy)
- Poecilus koyi vranensis (Schatzmayr, 1930) (Bosnia-Herzegovina)
