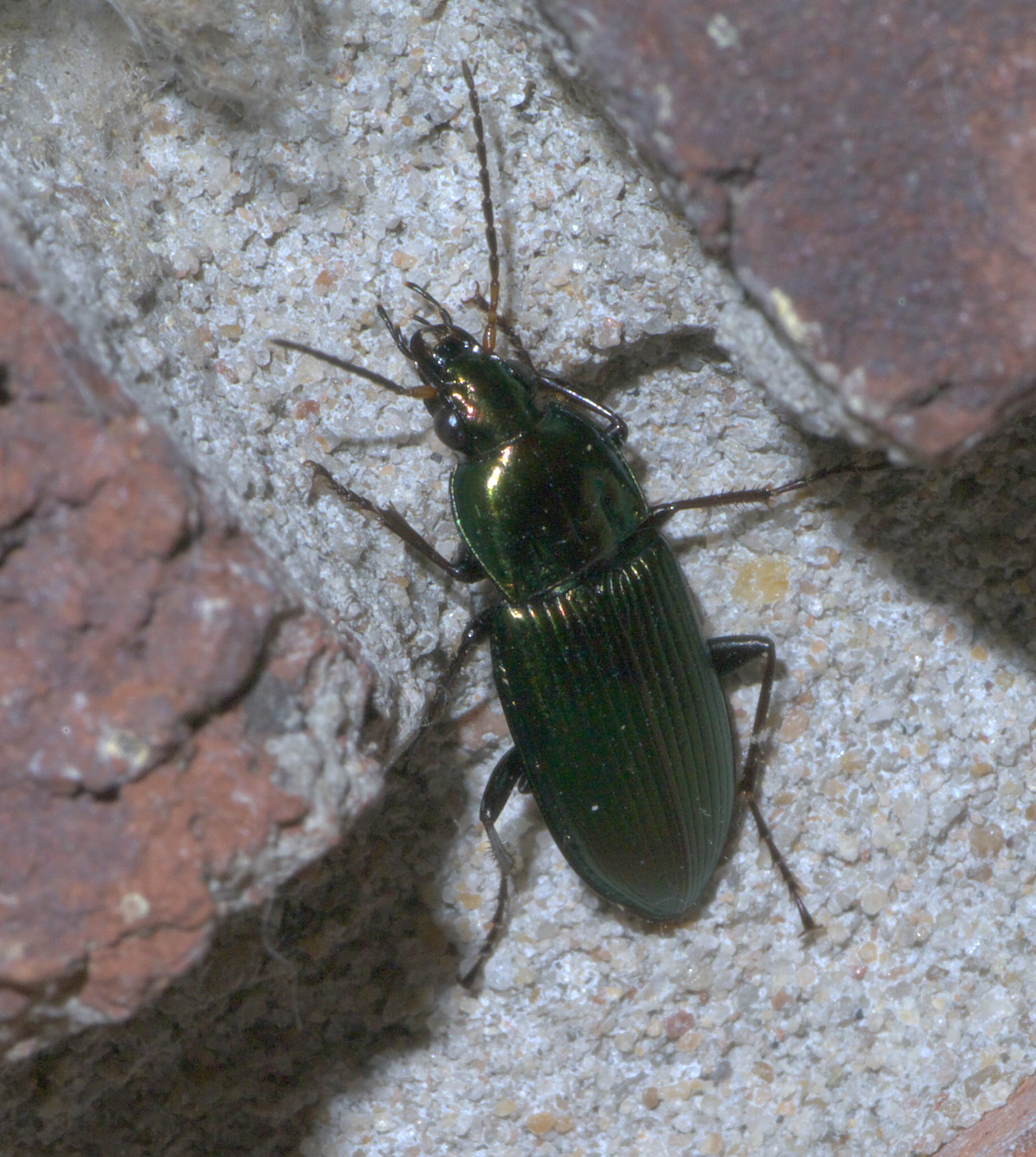

Scientific classification
- Kingdom: Animalia
- Phylum: Arthropoda
- Clade: Pancrustacea
- Class: Insecta
- Order: Coleoptera
- Suborder: Adephaga
- Family: Carabidae
- Genus: Poecilus
- Species: P. chalcites

Binomial name
- Poecilus chalcites (Say, 1823)

= Poecilus chalcites =

Species of beetle

Poecilus chalcites is a species of woodland ground beetle in the family Carabidae. It is found in the Caribbean, Central America, and North America, and is common in cropland of Illinois and other states.

Poecilus chalcites is a carnivourous species known to eat various crop pests including Diabrotica virgifera virgifera, Helicoverpa zea, Agrotis ipsilon, and Mythimna unipuncta.

Males and females can be distinguished by the shape of the most proximate foretarsus. In males, it is heart-shaped, but in females it is thinner.

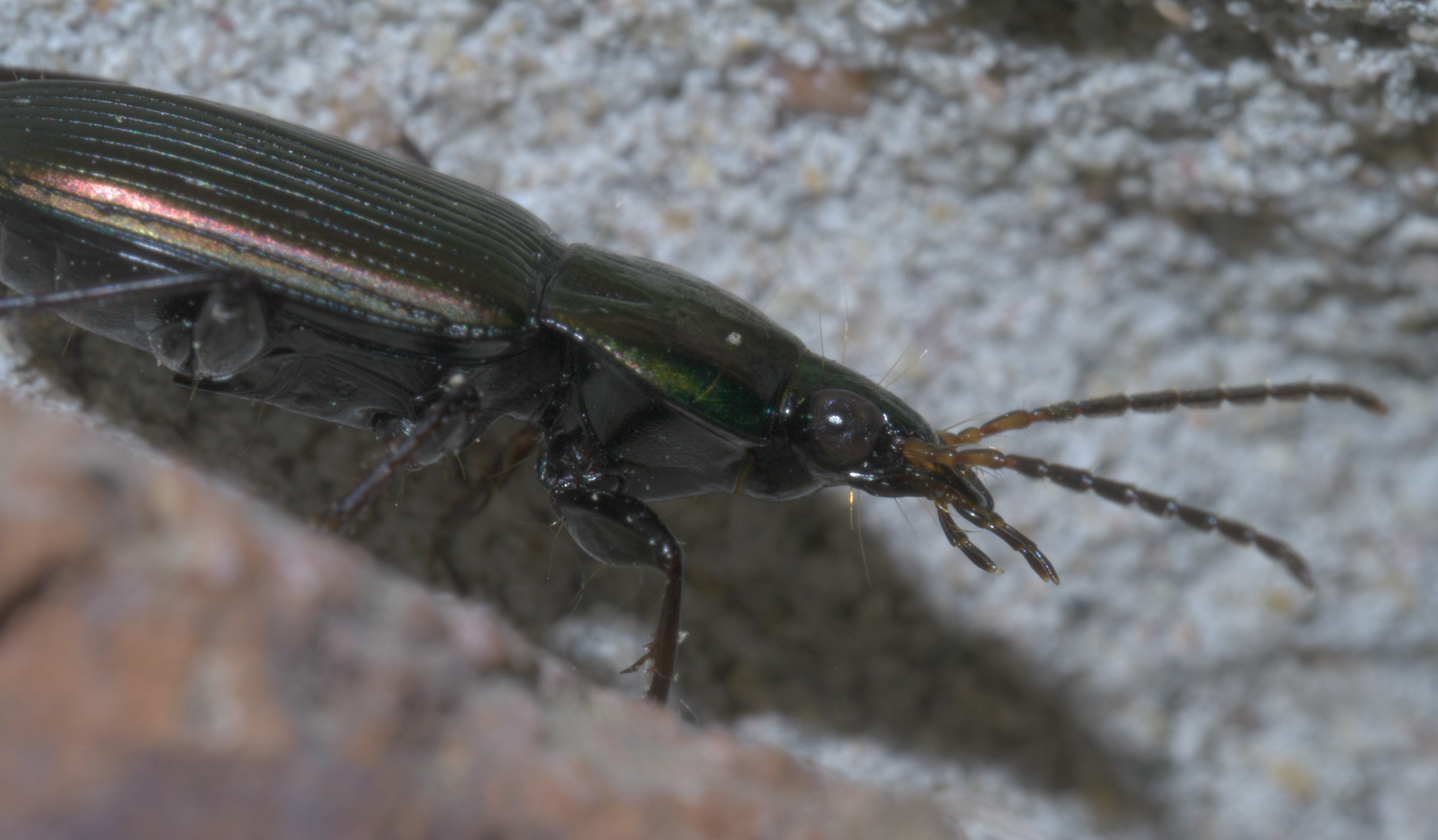
Poecilus chalcites, Pryor, OK, USA
