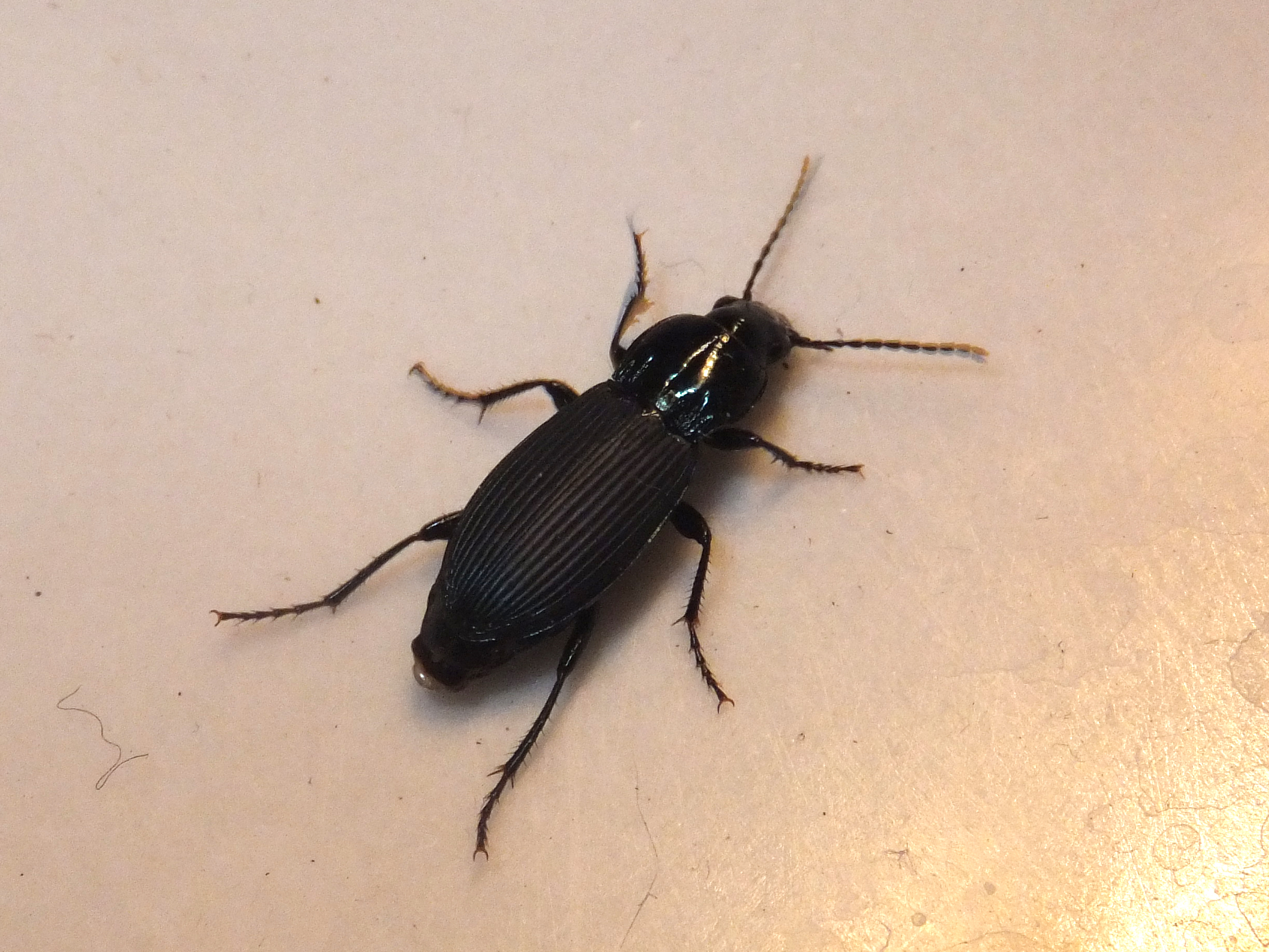

Scientific classification
- Domain: Eukaryota
- Kingdom: Animalia
- Phylum: Arthropoda
- Class: Insecta
- Order: Coleoptera
- Suborder: Adephaga
- Family: Carabidae
- Genus: Poecilus
- Species: P. lepidus

Binomial name
- Poecilus lepidus (Leske 1785)

= Poecilus lepidus =

Species of beetle

Poecilus lepidus is a species of ground beetle that was described by Nathanael Gottfried Leske in 1785.

== Range ==
Poecilus lepidus lives across Europe, including the United Kingdom, and Western Russia.

== Diet ==
Larvae of Poecilus lepidus (just like other Poecilus species) feed on the egg and larvae of other small arthropods. However, adults are omnivorous.

== Subspecies ==
There are three subspecies:

- Poecilus lepidus lepidus
- Poecilus lepidus gressorius
- Poecilus lepidus schatzmayri
