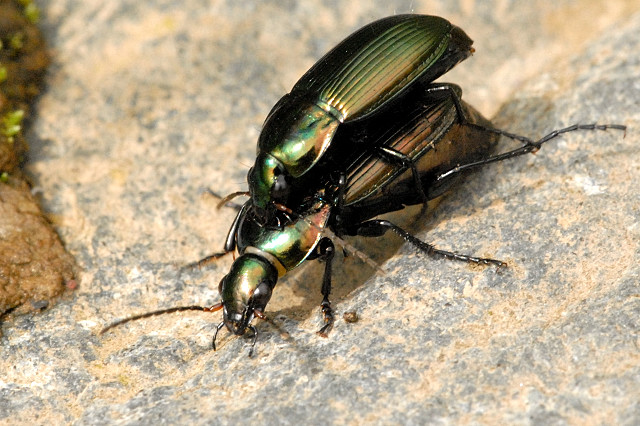
- Poecilus versicolor

Scientific classification
- Kingdom: Animalia
- Phylum: Arthropoda
- Class: Insecta
- Order: Coleoptera
- Suborder: Adephaga
- Family: Carabidae
- Subfamily: Pterostichinae
- Tribe: Pterostichini
- Genus: Poecilus; Bonelli, 1810

Subgenera
- Ancholeus Dejean, 1828; Carenostylus Chaudoir, 1838; Derus Motschulsky, 1844; Lyropedius Seidlitz, 1887; Metapedius A.Fiori, 1903; Parapedius Seidlitz, 1887; Poecilus Bonelli, 1810; Pseudoderus Seidlitz, 1887

= Poecilus =

Genus of beetles

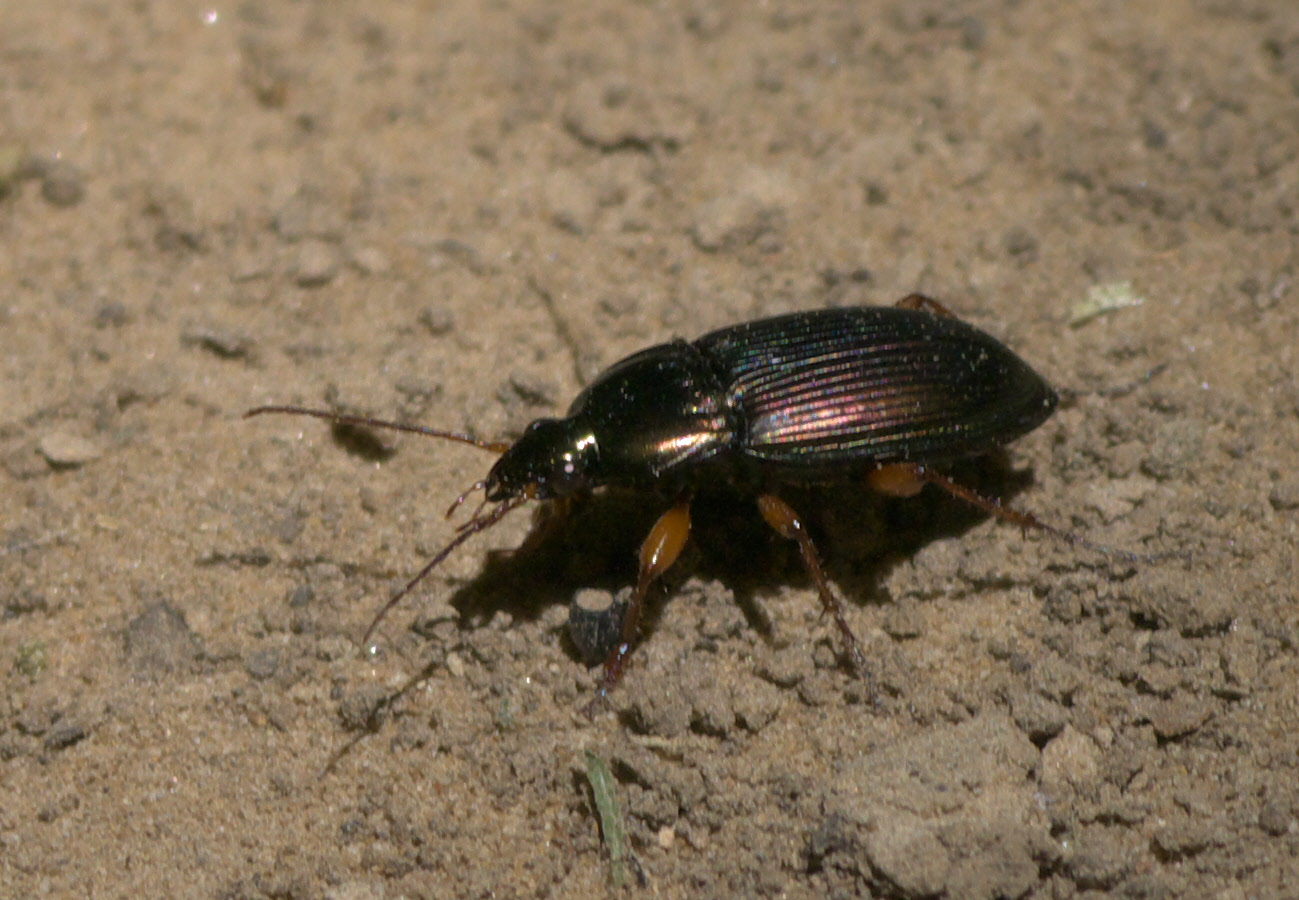
Poecilus lucublandus

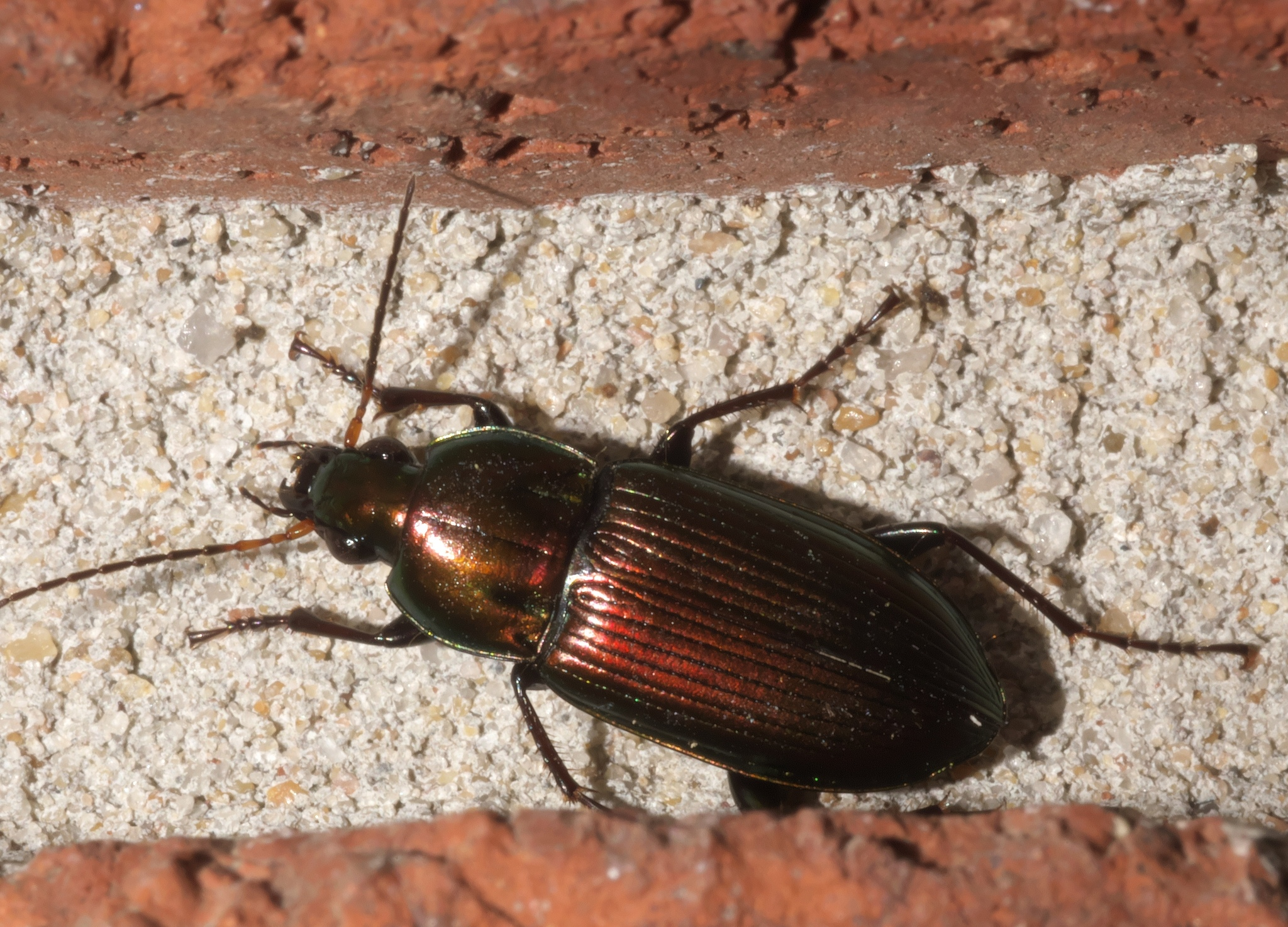
Poecilus chalcites, Oklahoma, USA

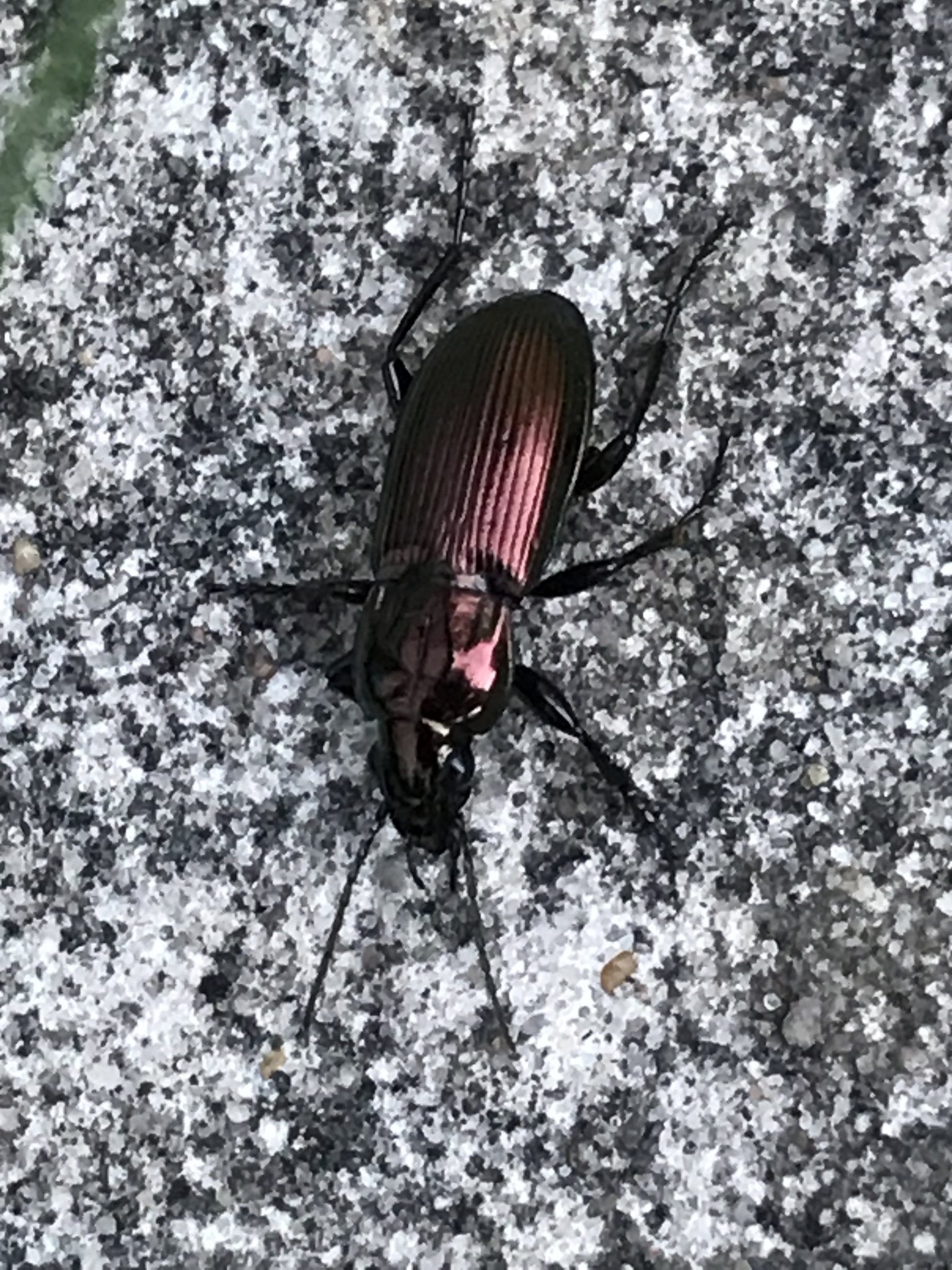
Poecilus lepidus, Denmark

Poecilus is a genus of ground beetle native to the Afro-tropical, the Palearctic (including Europe), the Near East, North Africa, and North America regions.

== Species ==
These 144 species belong to the genus Poecilus:

- Poecilus abditus (Lutshnik, 1934)
- Poecilus advena (Quensel, 1806)
- Poecilus aegyptius (Tschitscherine, 1897)
- Poecilus aeneolus (Chaudoir, 1868)
- Poecilus aerarius (Coquerel, 1859)
- Poecilus akinini Tschitscherine, 1887
- Poecilus alexandrae (Tschitscherine, 1889)
- Poecilus alutaceus (Tschitscherine, 1893)
- Poecilus anatolicus (Chaudoir, 1850)
- Poecilus anodon (Chaudoir, 1868)
- Poecilus aralensis (Glasunov, 1909)
- Poecilus aztecus (Tschitscherine, 1897)
- Poecilus baeticus Rambur, 1838
- Poecilus balassogloi Tschitscherine, 1887
- Poecilus batesianus (Lutshnik, 1916)
- Poecilus beesoni (Andrewes, 1927)
- Poecilus bogatshevi (Kryzhanovskij, 1983)
- Poecilus bokori (Csiki, 1930)
- Poecilus bonvoisini (Reiche & Saulcy, 1855)
- Poecilus campania (Andrewes, 1937)
- Poecilus carbonicolor Solsky, 1874
- Poecilus chalcites (Say, 1823)
- Poecilus chinensis (Jedlicka, 1962)
- Poecilus coarctatus Lucas, 1842
- Poecilus coloradensis (Csiki, 1930)
- Poecilus corvus (LeConte, 1873)
- Poecilus crenulatus (Dejean, 1828)
- Poecilus crenuliger Chaudoir, 1876
- Poecilus crimeanus (Straneo, 1960)
- Poecilus cupreus (Linnaeus, 1758)
- Poecilus cursitor LeConte, 1853
- Poecilus cursorius (Dejean, 1828)
- Poecilus curtonotoides Kabak, 1997
- Poecilus cyanicolor Chaudoir, 1876
- Poecilus decipiens Waltl, 1835
- Poecilus diplophryus Chaudoir, 1876
- Poecilus dissors (Tschitscherine, 1893)
- Poecilus effrenus (Lutshnik, 1930)
- Poecilus encopoleus Solsky, 1873
- Poecilus excellens (Tschitscherine, 1895)
- Poecilus exilicaudis Kabak, 1998
- Poecilus festivus (Chaudoir, 1868)
- Poecilus fortipes (Chaudoir, 1850)
- Poecilus gaturs (Davies, 2004)
- Poecilus gebleri (Dejean, 1828)
- Poecilus gisellae (Csiki, 1930)
- Poecilus gobiensis (Jedlicka, 1968)
- Poecilus gonioderus (Tschitscherine, 1901)
- Poecilus gotschii (Chaudoir, 1846)
- Poecilus grombczewskyi (Tschitscherine, 1891)
- Poecilus grumi (Tschitscherine, 1898)
- Poecilus gurjevae Kabak, 1994
- Poecilus hafezi (Morvan, 1975)
- Poecilus hanhaicus (Tschitscherine, 1894)
- Poecilus houskai (Jedlicka, 1952)
- Poecilus ilgazdensis (Jedlicka, 1961)
- Poecilus innatus (Glasunov, 1909)
- Poecilus iranicus (Morvan, 1974)
- Poecilus isfanensis Kabak, 1998
- Poecilus ispulensis Kabak, 1994
- Poecilus jakutorum (Poppius, 1904)
- Poecilus janthinipennis Solsky, 1874
- Poecilus jarkendis (Jedlicka, 1965)
- Poecilus kabulensis (Jedlicka, 1956)
- Poecilus kekesiensis Nyilas, 1993
- Poecilus kizbaiensis Kabak, 1994
- Poecilus korbi (Tschitscherine, 1893)
- Poecilus koslovi (Tschitscherine, 1903)
- Poecilus koyi Germar, 1823
- Poecilus kraatzii (Heyden, 1882)
- Poecilus kugelanni (Panzer, 1796)
- Poecilus laetulus (LeConte, 1863)
- Poecilus laevicollis Chaudoir, 1842
- Poecilus laevigatus (L.Dufour, 1820)
- Poecilus lamproderus (Chaudoir, 1868)
- Poecilus lepidus (Leske, 1785)
- Poecilus leptoderus Solsky, 1874
- Poecilus liosomus Chaudoir, 1876
- Poecilus longiventris Solsky, 1874
- Poecilus lucasii (Reiche, 1861)
- Poecilus lucublandus (Say, 1823)
- Poecilus lyroderus (Chaudoir, 1846)
- Poecilus major (Motschulsky, 1844)
- Poecilus melanochrus (Tschitscherine, 1901)
- Poecilus mesembrinus (Tschitscherine, 1896)
- Poecilus mexicanus Chaudoir, 1876
- Poecilus mongoliensis (Jedlicka, 1962)
- Poecilus muchei (Jedlicka, 1961)
- Poecilus nearcticus (Lindroth, 1966)
- Poecilus nemotoi (Straneo, 1989)
- Poecilus nigripalpis (Jedlicka, 1963)
- Poecilus nitens (Chaudoir, 1850)
- Poecilus nitidicollis Motschulsky, 1844
- Poecilus nitidus (Dejean, 1828)
- Poecilus occidentalis (Dejean, 1828)
- Poecilus oirat Kabak, 1994
- Poecilus ovtshinnikovi Kabak, 1994
- Poecilus pantanellii (A.Fiori, 1903)
- Poecilus peregrinus (Tschitscherine, 1898)
- Poecilus pertusus (Schaum, 1858)
- Poecilus pharao (Lutshnik, 1916)
- Poecilus polychromus (Tschitscherine, 1889)
- Poecilus prasinotinctus (Csiki, 1930)
- Poecilus pseudopurpurascens (Kirschenhofer, 1987)
- Poecilus pucholti (Jedlicka, 1962)
- Poecilus puer Kabak, 1997
- Poecilus punctibasis (Chaudoir, 1868)
- Poecilus puncticollis (Dejean, 1828)
- Poecilus punctulatus (Schaller, 1783)
- Poecilus purpurascens (Dejean, 1828)
- Poecilus quadricollis (Dejean, 1828)
- Poecilus ravus (Lutshnik, 1922)
- Poecilus rebeli (Apfelbeck, 1904)
- Poecilus reflexicollis Gebler, 1832
- Poecilus reicheianus (Peyron, 1858)
- Poecilus rostowtzowi (Tschitscherine, 1899)
- Poecilus samojedorum (J.Sahlberg, 1880)
- Poecilus samurai (Lutshnik, 1916)
- Poecilus schamsiensis (Poppius, 1908)
- Poecilus scitulus LeConte, 1846
- Poecilus slivkini Kabak, 1994
- Poecilus soederbomi (Jedlicka, 1935)
- Poecilus songinus (Jedlicka, 1968)
- Poecilus spectus (Jedlicka, 1962)
- Poecilus stenoderus (Chaudoir, 1846)
- Poecilus striatopunctatus (Duftschmid, 1812)
- Poecilus subcoeruleus (Quensel, 1806)
- Poecilus subsimilis (Tschitscherine, 1893)
- Poecilus syriensis (Jedlicka, 1957)
- Poecilus szepligetii (Csiki, 1908)
- Poecilus tarimensis (Tschitscherine, 1896)
- Poecilus tengrensis (Jedlicka, 1960)
- Poecilus texanus (LeConte, 1863)
- Poecilus timuri Kabak, 1994
- Poecilus toxanbaicus (Kabak, 1990)
- Poecilus tschitscherini (Semenov, 1891)
- Poecilus turkestanicus Reitter, 1891
- Poecilus urgens (Tschitscherine, 1898)
- Poecilus uygur Kabak, 1997
- Poecilus versicolor (Sturm, 1824)
- Poecilus vicinus Levrat, 1858
- Poecilus wollastoni (Wollaston, 1854)
- Poecilus zaballosi Jeanne & Ruiz-Tapiador, 1995
- Poecilus zhicharevi (Lutshnik, 1933)
