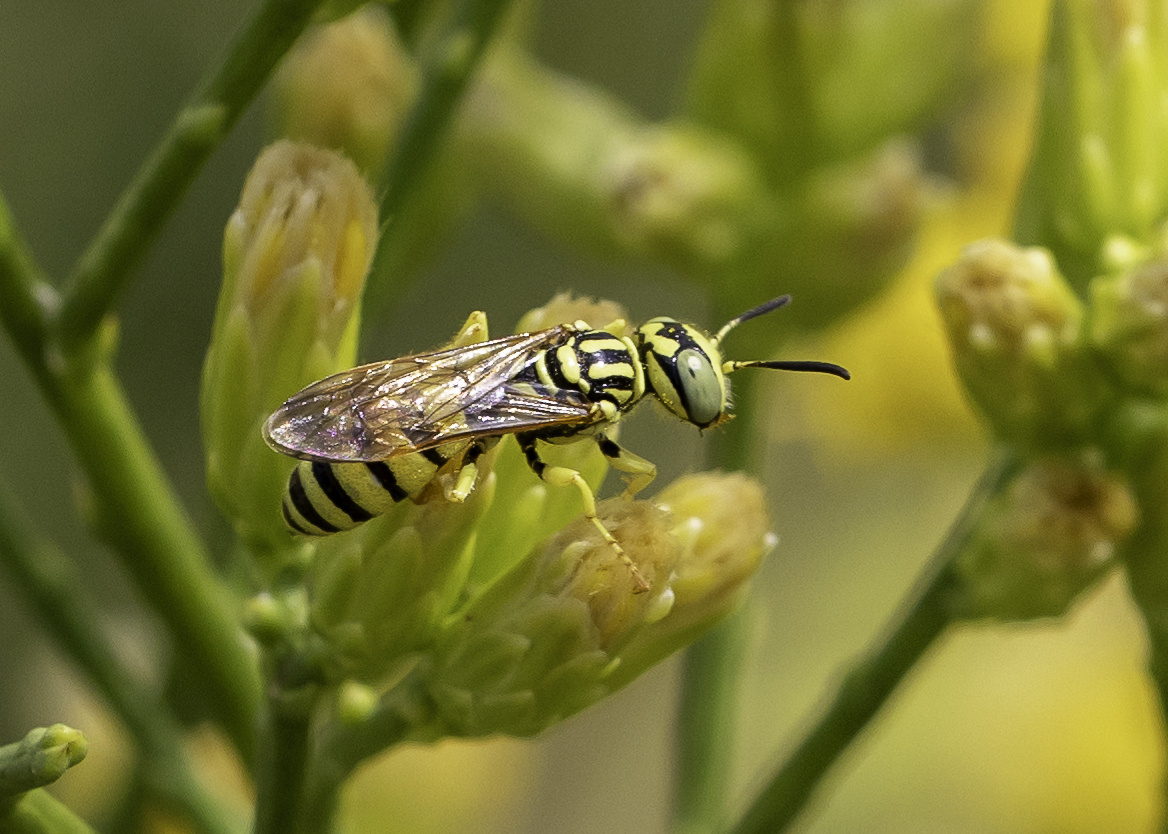

Scientific classification
- Domain: Eukaryota
- Kingdom: Animalia
- Phylum: Arthropoda
- Class: Insecta
- Order: Hymenoptera
- Family: Philanthidae
- Genus: Philanthus
- Species: P. multimaculatus

Binomial name
- Philanthus multimaculatus (Cameron, 1891)

= Philanthus multimaculatus =

Genus of wasps

Philanthus multimaculatus is a species of bee-hunting wasp, or beewolf, found from British Columbia and Alberta south to Zacatecas and San Luis Potosi.
