= Philanthus lepidus =

Scientific classification
- Domain: Eukaryota
- Kingdom: Animalia
- Phylum: Arthropoda
- Class: Insecta
- Order: Hymenoptera
- Family: Philanthidae
- Genus: Philanthus
- Species: P. lepidus

Binomial name
- Philanthus lepidus Cresson, 1865

Synonyms
- Philanthus carolinensis Banks, 1913; Philanthus carolinensis reductus Banks, 1921

Species of wasp

Philanthus lepidus is a species of wasp in the family Philanthidae. It is found in North America. It creates false burrows in its nests, and preys upon Halictidae bees.
