= Philanthus pacificus =

Scientific classification
- Domain: Eukaryota
- Kingdom: Animalia
- Phylum: Arthropoda
- Class: Insecta
- Order: Hymenoptera
- Family: Philanthidae
- Genus: Philanthus
- Species: P. pacificus

Binomial name
- Philanthus pacificus Cresson, 1880

Species of wasp

Philanthus pacificus is a species of wasp in the family Philanthidae. It is found from southwestern British Columbia to Baja California and Sonora.

== Subspecies ==
These two subspecies belong to the species Philanthus pacificus:

- Philanthus pacificus arizonae Dunning, 1898
- Philanthus pacificus pacificus Cresson, 1880
