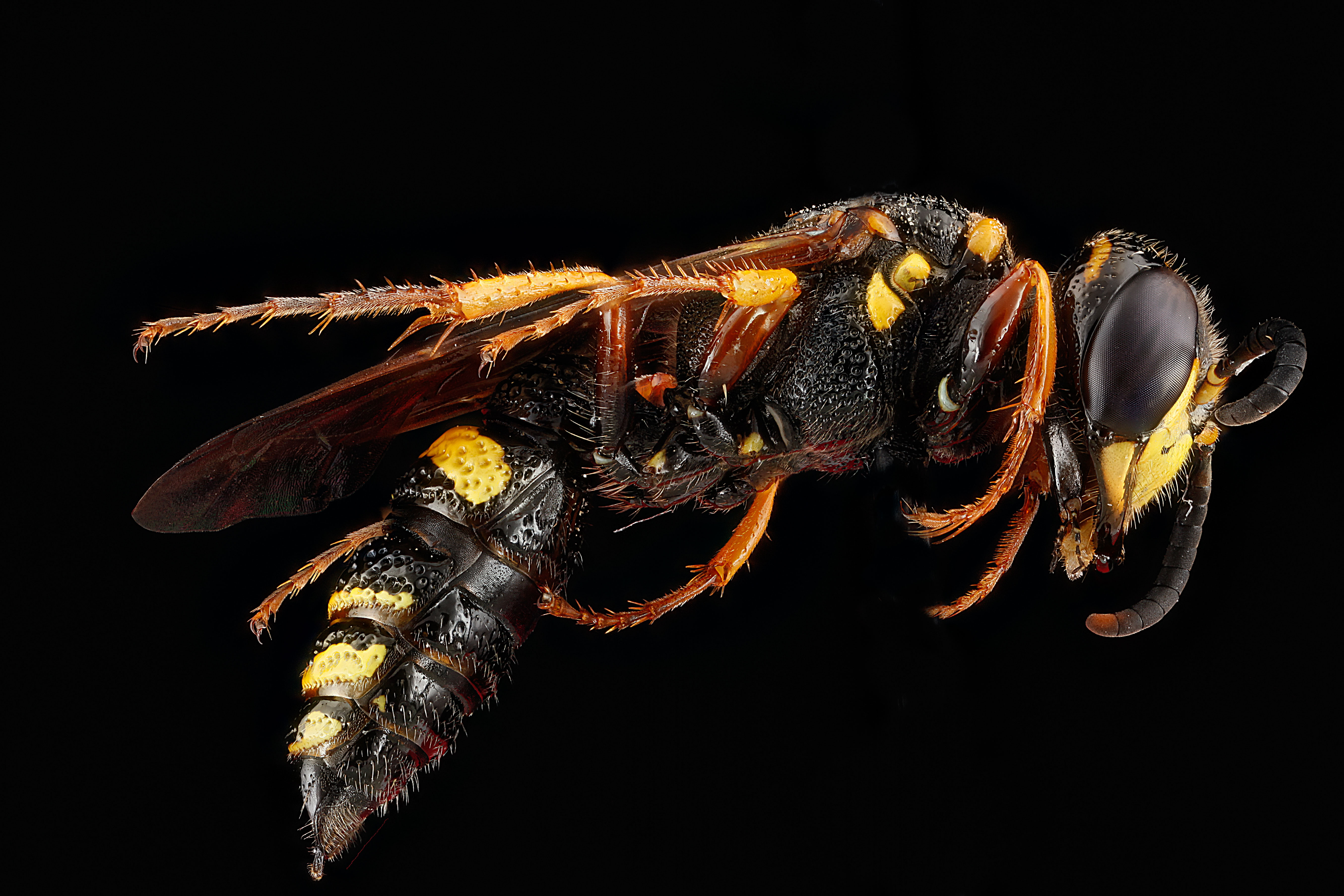

Scientific classification
- Kingdom: Animalia
- Phylum: Arthropoda
- Class: Insecta
- Order: Hymenoptera
- Family: Philanthidae
- Genus: Philanthus
- Species: P. gibbosus

Binomial name
- Philanthus gibbosus (Fabricius, 1775)

Synonyms
- Anthophilus gibbosus Dahlbom, 1844; Anthophilus maculiventris Cameron, 1905; Anthophilus melanaspis Cameron, 1905; Anthophilus punctatus (Say, 1824); Cheilopogonus punctiger Westwood, 1835

= Philanthus gibbosus =

Species of wasp

Philanthus gibbosus, the hump-backed beewolf, is a species of bee-hunting wasp and is the most common and widespread beewolf in North America. P. gibbosus is of the order Hymenoptera and the genus Philanthus. It is native to the Midwestern United States and the western Appalachians. P. gibbosus are often observed to visit flowers and other plants in search of insect prey to feed their young. The prey that P. gibbosus catches is then coated in a layer of pollen and fed to the young wasps.

== Taxonomy and phylogeny ==
Philanthus gibbosus is a member of the family Philanthidae of wasps within the order Hymenoptera.

Molecular phylogeny revealed that bees, clade Anthophila, came from within the family Crabronidae sensu lato, meaning the family was paraphyletic. As a result, this species's subfamily, Philanthinae, was elevated to family status as Philanthidae.

The genus Philanthus contains about 135 other species in addition to P. gibbosus.

== Description and identification ==
Philanthus gibbosus is a small and robust wasp that is about 10–12 mm in length. P. gibbosus has an especially broad head and a coat of chitin that is shiny black with yellow spots on the head and yellow stripes on the abdomen and thorax. There are very large, deep punctures on the abdomen of P. gibbosus, making the species easy and distinct to identify in comparison to other members of the genus Philanthus.

=== Females ===
While the general range of P. gibbosus size is 10–12 mm in length, females are usually closer to the smaller end of the scale. Female P. gibbosus have more yellow coloration on the head than do the males of the species.

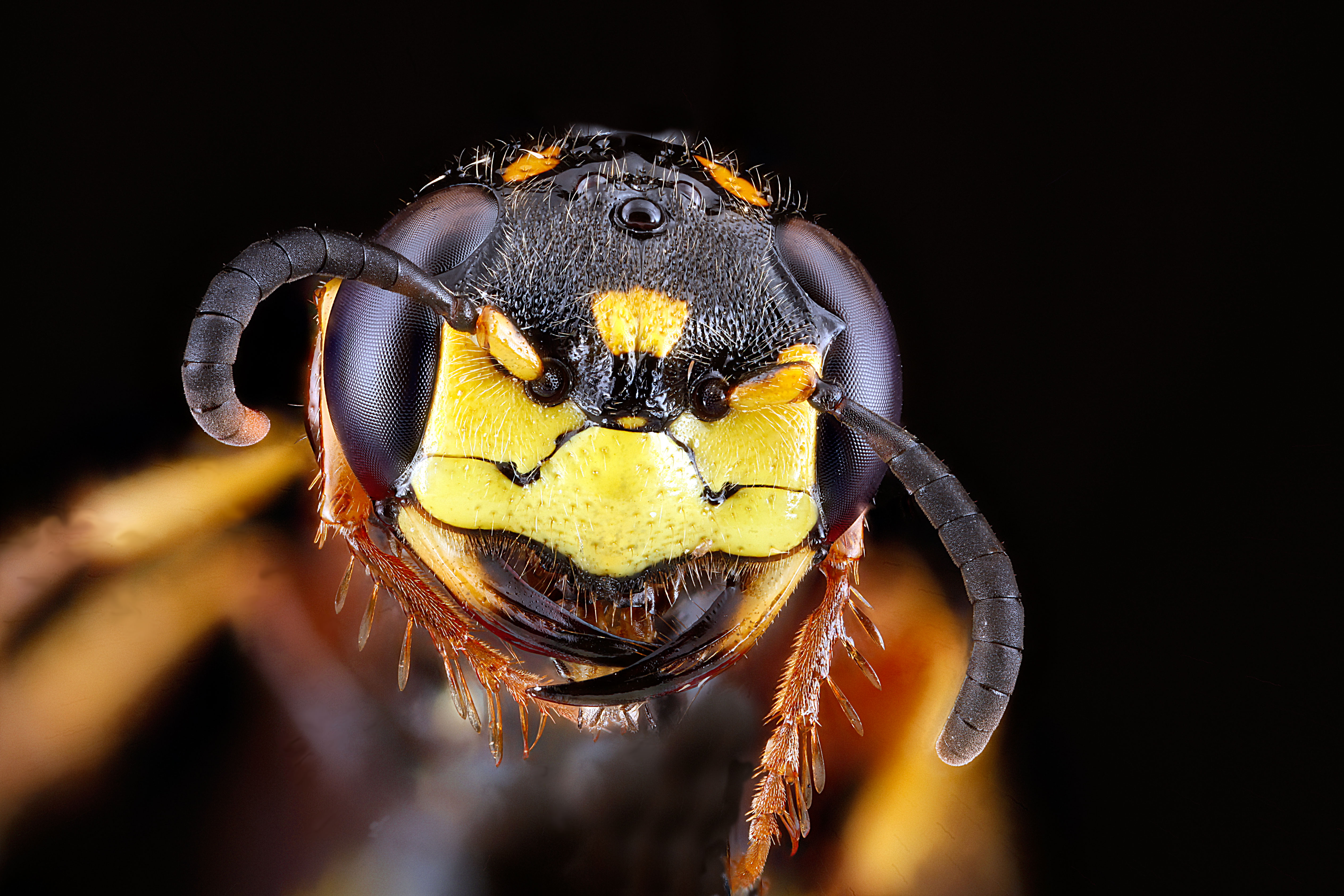
Female P. gibbosus

=== Males ===
The males of P. gibbosus resemble the females very closely, but the most notable difference is the significantly reduced presence of yellow spots on the head. This is opposite of the usual pattern observed within the order Hymenoptera. Most commonly, the males in hymenopteran species have an excess of yellow spots on the head while females lack spots.

== Distribution and habitat ==
Philanthus gibbosus is a common and widely distributed species in North America. It has been primarily observed to inhabit the central Midwestern United States; it has been observed as far west as Kansas and as far south as Georgia, but tends to be concentrated around Missouri and Tennessee. P. gibbosus also tends to inhabit coastal areas where the soil has a sandy composition. P. gibbosus is known to prefer the climate and habitat of deciduous forests. P. gibbosus prefers the soil composition of deciduous and coastal regions because it builds its nests in burrows. Thus, the soil must be of an ideal composition for burrowing.

== Colony cycle ==
In general, P. gibbosus goes through two generations of colonies a year.

=== Colony initiation ===
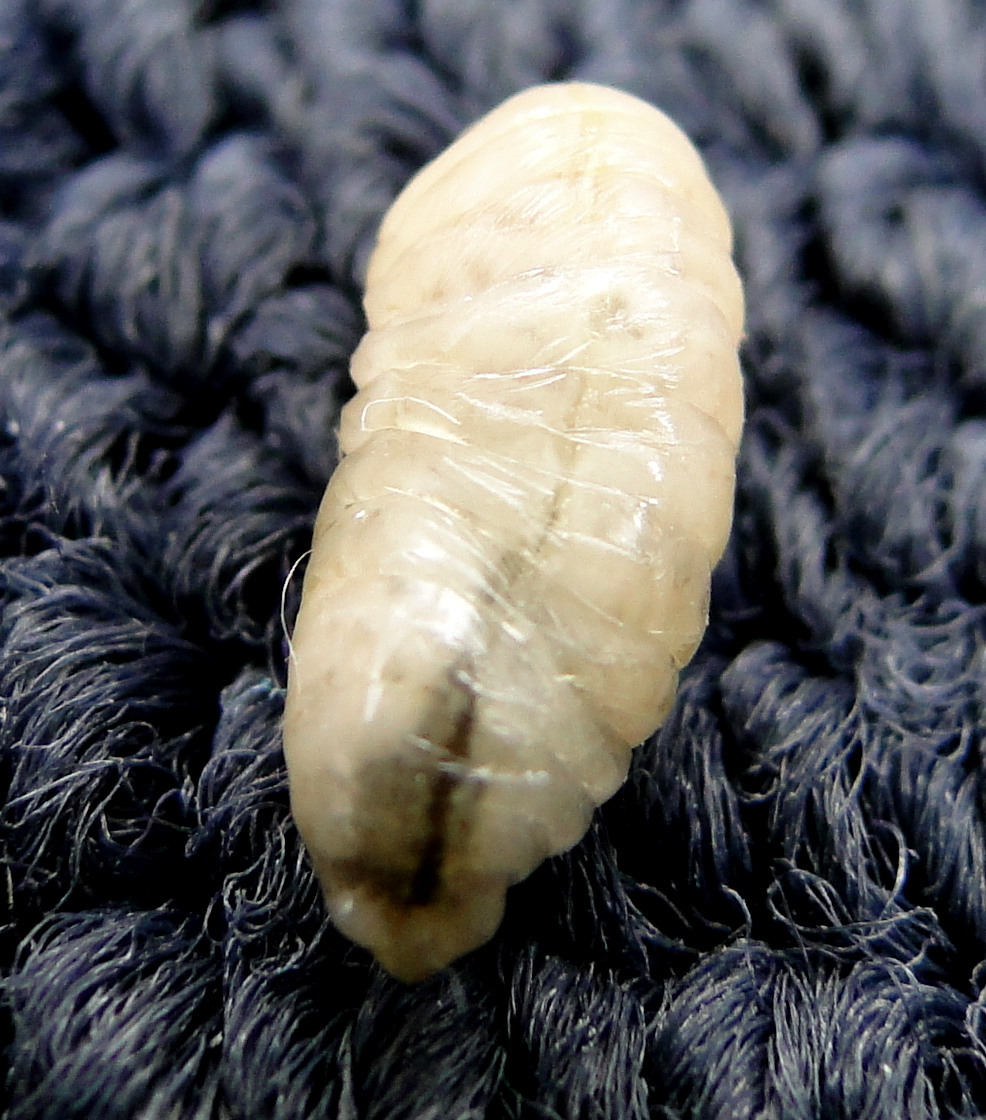
P. gibbosus larvae

The cycle begins around the first or second week of June when the early pioneers start searching for a nesting site. Even though the searching starts as early as June, the actual digging of the new nest may not start until the first or second week of July. By early July, however, nest construction is in full swing. Females spend about three weeks completely devoting themselves to provisioning and laying eggs, but once the season is over, they die.

=== Colony growth ===
In the middle of July, the progeny of the first brood begin to emerge. The emergence of larvae continues to rise linearly through the last week of August. A majority of these new progeny have already dispersed to lay new eggs and died off by early September. The few members of the new progeny that remain continue laying eggs for another two weeks, but will die by October, likely due to changes in climate around that time. This second generation of larvae survive the winter by remaining in their cocoons from October through April. In April, the second generation changes into pupae and emerge in May. Those that emerge in May are the wasps that are responsible for searching for a new nesting location in June.

== Behavior ==
Adult P. gibbosus females are responsible for digging tunnels into the ground for nesting. Meanwhile, territorial males mark objects and supporting structures surrounding the nest with pheromones to demarcate the nesting territory from competing males. The larvae generated by the females are carnivorous, which forces the inseminated females to hunt for other invertebrates, in this case bees (hence the common name "beewolf"), on which she lays her eggs. By laying her eggs on pollen-coated bee species, the larvae are supplied with prey for nutrients instantly when they emerge. The adults, on the other hand, feed on nectar that is foraged from flowers.

=== Burrow occupation ===
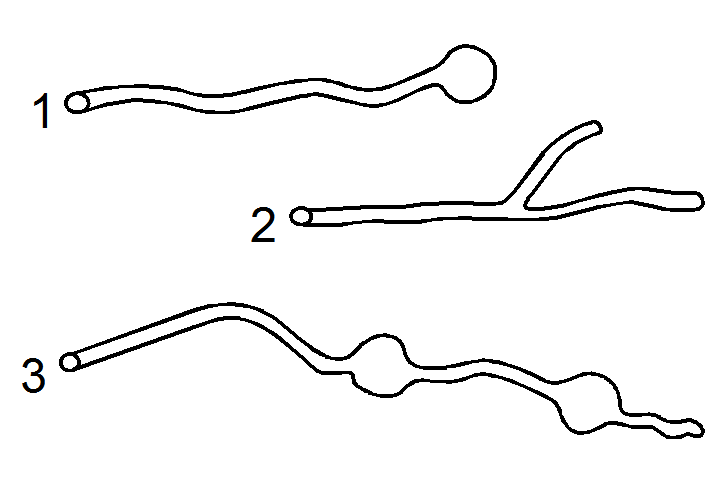
Various burrow architectures of P. gibbosus

Philanthus gibbosus is a solitary wasp that nests in the ground. Several individuals have been observed to cohabit a single burrow at a time. However, there is evidence that suggests that while females tend to occupy the parental nest for a mere several days of their lives, the males will sometimes inhabit the nest for their entire life. After the few days in their original nest, the females will disperse to new nests. However, one single female may continue to inhabit and expand the original nest. On very rare occasions, two females may provision the original nest at the same time for a very brief period. Evidence suggests that P. gibbosus may be representative of a unique stage in presociality in which temporary communal nesting occurs at certain phases of the nesting cycle, in spite of the species' usual solitary living.

=== Communication ===
Because P. gibbosus is a solitary wasp species, there is not much need for intra-species communication. However, when mating, males are responsible for marking the territory surrounding the nest with pheromones as a means of warding off other competing males from mating with the female in the nest. These pheromones are the main form of intra-communication, specifically between the different, individual males of P. gibbosus.

== Nesting sites ==
Philanthus gibbosus prefers nesting in sandy soil. Because soils with high sand composition are lighter in weight than other types of soil, they are ideal for the burrowing behavior of P. gibbosus since sandy soil is easier to dig through. Moreover, the nesting sites are usually centered around some sort of supporting structure, for example underneath bricks, tree roots, or cement. As a result, weedy, sandy areas of earth are strongly preferable as nesting sites for P. gibbosus, which can often be found near coastal areas as a result.

=== Burrow structure ===
During the main season of its activity, May through September, the entrance to the nesting sites of P. gibbosus can be characterized by the scattered heaps of sand or soil around their supporting structure, usually bricks or tree roots. The sand heaps are very low and spread out. In building these sand heaps, females can be observed backing out of the burrow with moist sand or soil that is spread around into the heaps using jerks of her front legs. While burrowing, P. gibbosus stands on its hind legs. In order to dig the actual burrow, P. gibbosus uses its tarsi and mandibles to dig a shaft that is at least two feet in length. The shaft culminates in an oval shaped cell in which eggs are provisioned. Other oval shaped cells line the shaft which are smaller in size and contain the skeletons of other bees that were killed and fed to the larvae as nutrients.

== Mimicry and camouflage ==
=== Mimicry ===
Philanthus gibbosus is a part of a mimicry group with a wide variety of other wasps that also exhibit black and yellow banding and coloring. It has been observed that mimicry is high in spring and early summer, generally absent in midsummer, and infrequent in late summer. This implies that some members of the mimicry group, including P. gibbosus, may be selected to avoid the midsummer season when insectivorous birds are abundant and have not yet learned to avoid the models which the mimics resemble. The colony cycle of P. gibbosus lines up with this scheduling in such a way that minimizes the amount of predation the species faces.

=== Warning coloration ===
While P. gibbosus does not camouflage with its surroundings, it exhibits a black and yellow chitin coating that serves as a warning to other predatory species. This coloration pattern that is characteristic of many species of wasps is a somewhat universal sign that an organism stings and should, as a result, be avoided in predation.

== Interaction with other species ==
=== Diet ===
Philanthus gibbosus spend a significant amount of time loitering around flowers and other plants in search of insect prey to feed their young, most often bee species. Some common species that P. gibbosus predates include the beetle Cucochodaeus sparsus and sweat bees Augochlora pura and Lasioglossum cinctipes (formerly Evylaeus arcuatus).

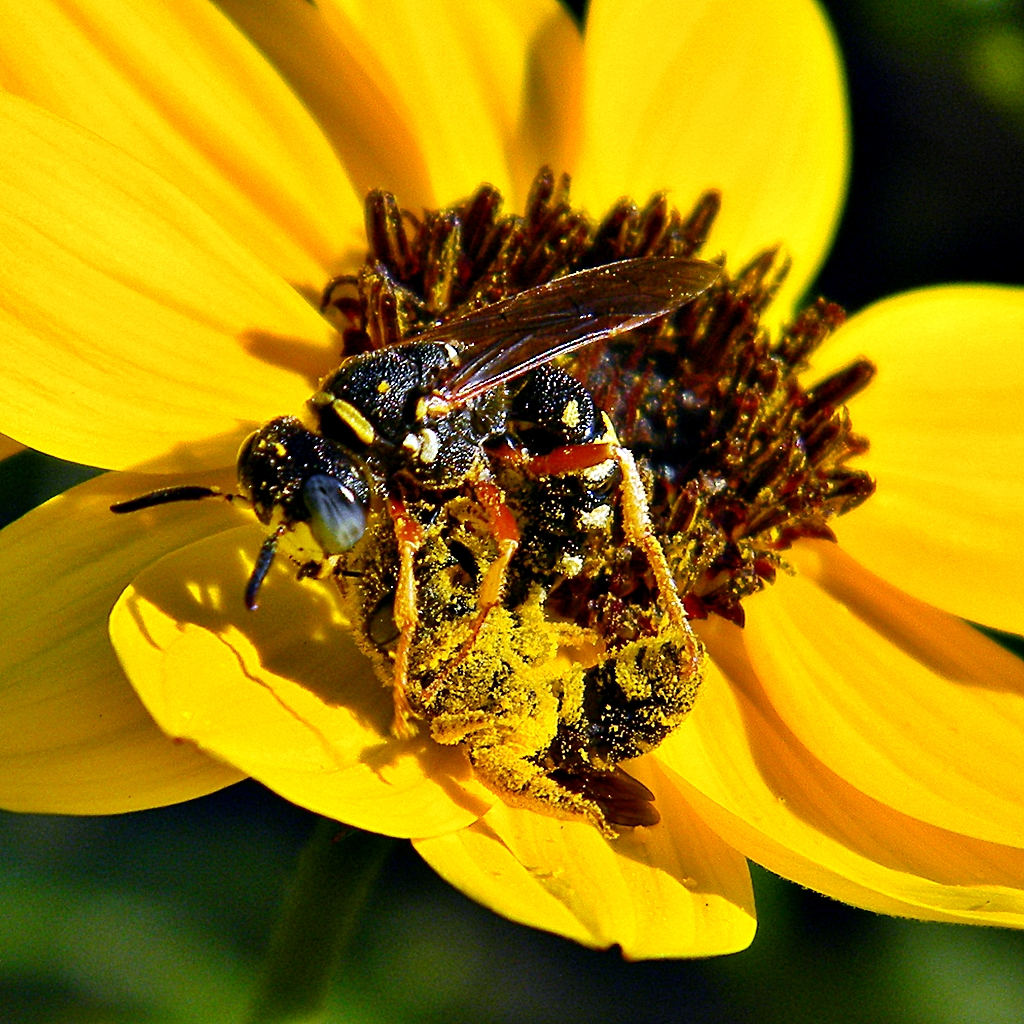
Predation of a bee by P. gibbosus

=== Stings ===
Philanthus gibbosus is notable in that it stings its prey in a membranous location on the ventral surface of the abdomen where the venom is quick to incapacitate many major, voluntary muscles. The paralyzing effect of the injected venom is likely due largely in part to a block of the somatic neuromuscular transmission. It has also been established that the venom is not limited exclusively to the natural prey, the honey bee, but also in many other insect species belonging to different orders, including spiders. Only P. triangulum itself and a digger wasp that preys on P. triangulum are immune to the venom. However, the sting does not kill the prey. The prey may attempt to sting in return, but P. gibbosus always grabs the prey in such a way that the well-armored portions of the body are presented, thus protecting P. gibbosus from a retaliation by the prey. P. gibbosus then carries its paralyzed prey back to an oval cell in its nest for temporary storage until it is later used in the laying of an egg.

=== Predators ===
Although P. gibbosus feeds on insects, they are also prey for certain insects as well. Predatory insects for P. gibbosus include praying mantis, robber flies, and dragonflies. Sometimes, smaller P. gibbosus individuals will be preyed on by larger wasps. Some birds will even regularly consume wasps. A few examples of birds that prey on P. gibbosus include sparrows, wrens, and summer tanagers. In general, these birds normally exclusively hunt solitary wasps, making P. gibbosus an ideal target. Moreover, the birds avoid disturbing P. gibbosus near their nests.

=== Defense ===
Philanthus gibbosus has a sting that is painful and menacing enough to deter most potential predators. P. gibbosus's black and yellow coloring serves as a warning to other organisms, as that color pattern often indicates a dangerous species. Additionally, the burrowing behavior of P. gibbosus provides the species with a suitable hiding spot to avoid predators. Because the burrows are so far into the ground, usually around two feet, P. gibbosus is able to avoid predation by remaining in its burrow.

=== Parasites ===
Philanthus gibbosus is most notably parasitized by a nest parasite, Senotainia trilineata, a Miltogrammid fly. P. gibbosus utilizes a flight pattern in which it flies over the nest from above as a means of surveying its nest for the parasite, one that is different from other species of the same genus.

=== Mutualism ===
While not much research has been done on which specific pathogens affect P. gibbosus, Streptomyces have been observed to be antibiotic-producing symbionts, which have been suggested to potentially defend their wasp hosts from a variety of pathogenic microbes. This array of phylogenetically diverse and chemically prolific Actinomycetota that has been observed in P. gibbosus suggests that these types of insect-associated Actinomycetota can serve as a source of natural products of pharmaceutical interest for other species.

== Interaction with humans ==
=== Agriculture ===
Philanthus gibbosus is a pollinator of some plants. It has been observed pollinating carrot plants.

=== Beekeeping ===
Philanthus gibbosus presents a challenge for beekeepers. Because of its tendency to prey on honey-producing bees, P. gibbosus has been known to attack beekeeping sites. This complicates the process of beekeeping and hinders honey production.
