= Philanthus coronatus =

Scientific classification
- Domain: Eukaryota
- Kingdom: Animalia
- Phylum: Arthropoda
- Class: Insecta
- Order: Hymenoptera
- Family: Philanthidae
- Genus: Philanthus
- Species: P. coronatus

Binomial name
- Philanthus coronatus (Thunberg, 1784)

Synonyms
- Sphex coronatus Thunberg, 1784

Species of wasp

Philanthus coronatus is a species of bee-hunting wasp (or "beewolf") of Europe and the Middle East, of which there are three known subspecies:

- P. coronatus coronatus Thunberg, 1784 (type-subspecies)
- P. coronatus ibericus Beaumont, 1970
- P. coronatus orientalis Bytinski-Salz, 1959
