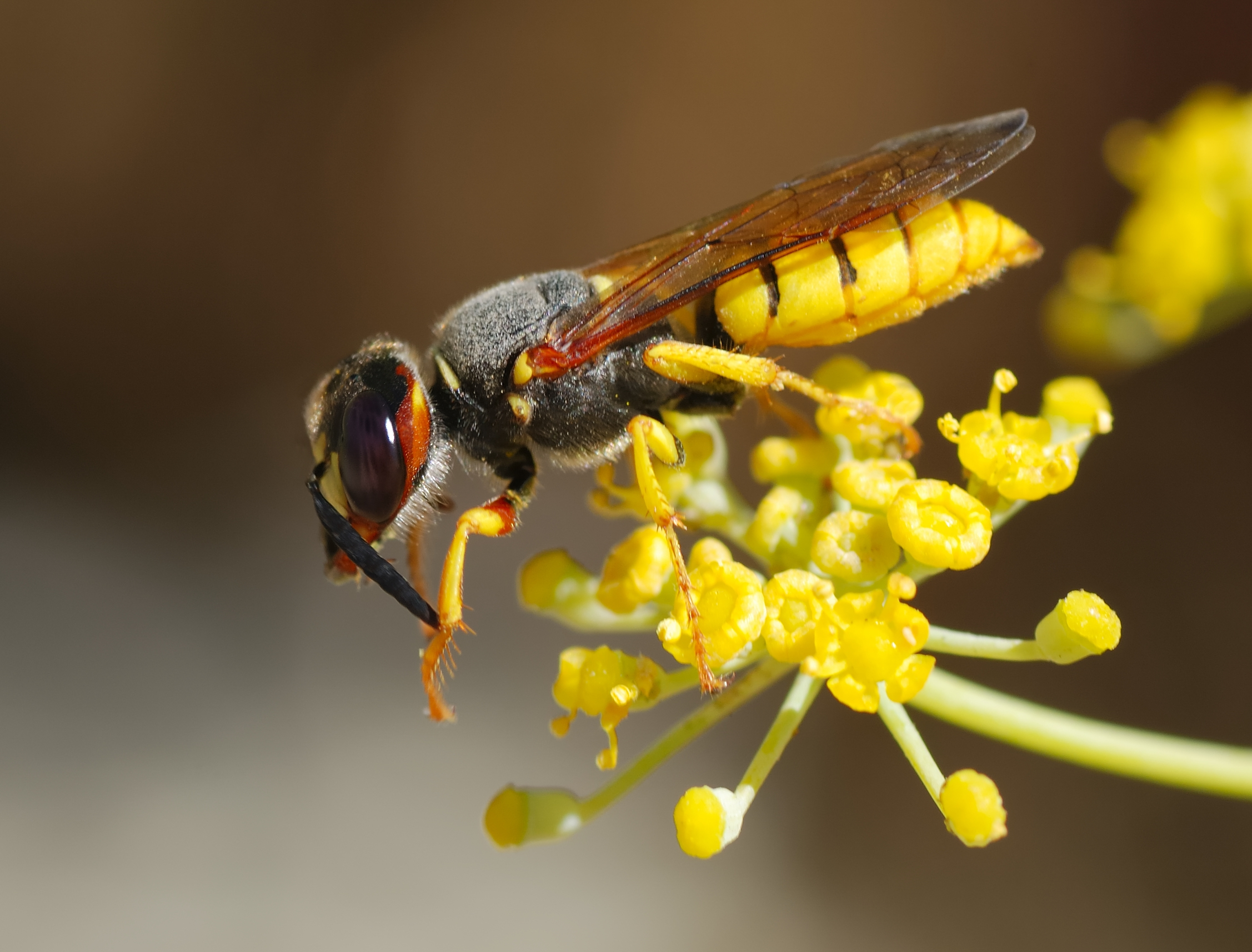
- European beewolf (Philanthus triangulum)

Scientific classification
- Kingdom: Animalia
- Phylum: Arthropoda
- Class: Insecta
- Order: Hymenoptera
- Family: Philanthidae
- Tribe: Philanthini
- Genus: Philanthus; Fabricius, 1790

Type species
- Philanthus coronatus (Thunberg, 1784)

Diversity
- 133

= Beewolf =

Philanthus

Genus of wasps

Beewolves (genus Philanthus), also known as bee-hunters or bee-killer wasps, are solitary, predatory wasps, most of which prey on bees, hence their common name. The adult females dig tunnels in the ground for nesting, while the territorial males mark twigs and other objects with pheromones to claim the territory from competing males.

As with all other apoid wasps, the larvae are carnivorous, forcing the inseminated females to hunt for other invertebrates (in this case bees), on which she lays her eggs, supplying the larvae with prey when they emerge. The adults consume nectar from flowers.

The prevalent European species, P. triangulum, specializes in preying upon honey bees, thus making it a minor pest for beekeepers. Other Philanthus may specialize in other bee species or they may be generalists which prey upon a wide variety of bees such as the American bumblebee, Bombus pensylvanicus, or other hymenopterans, including conspecifics.

They are notable for stinging their prey in a membranous location on the ventral surface, where the venom quickly paralyzes major voluntary muscles, yet does not kill the prey. The prey may attempt to sting in return, but it is always grabbed in such a way that only well-armored portions of the beewolf's body are presented. The beewolf carries its prey back to a tunnel, but usually only stores it temporarily, until it is later used to provision a cell burrow, where an egg is laid.

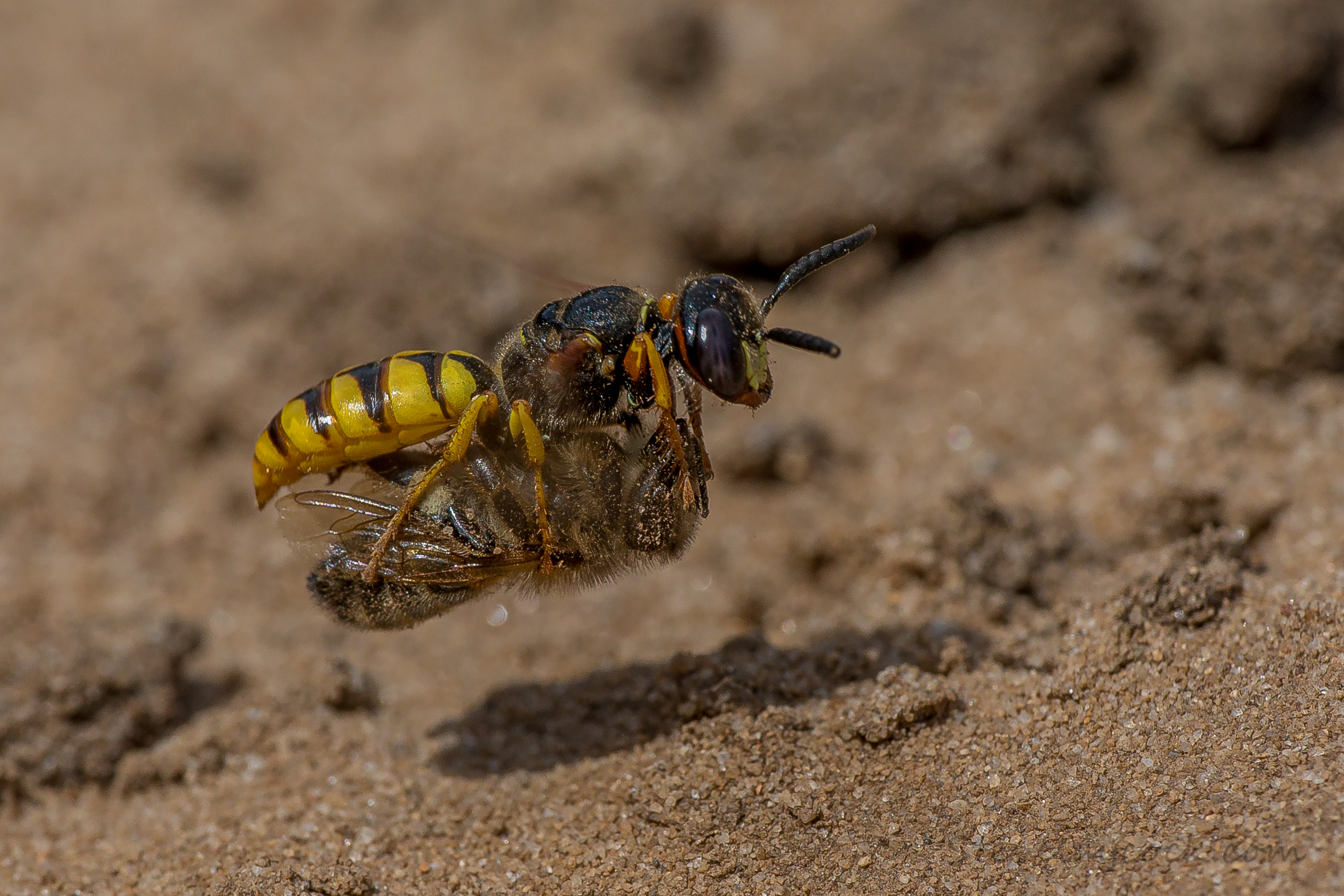
Beewolf with honey bee

The tunnel of Philanthus triangulum can be as much as 1 m long. The first part of the tunnel slopes downward at an angle of 30°, after which it levels out. Up to 34 lateral tunnels, each ending in a brood chamber, branch off from the main tunnel. Each brood chamber is stocked with one to six honeybees.

== Gallery ==
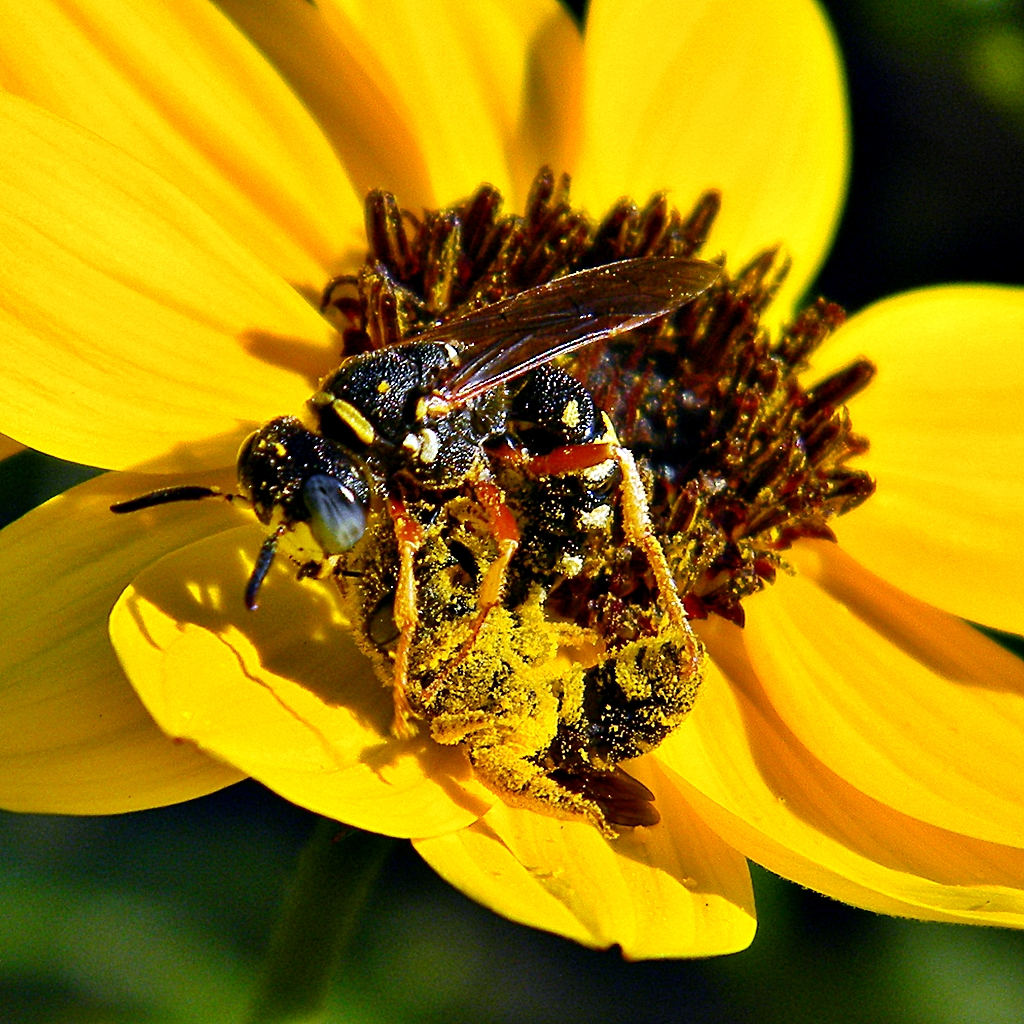
Philanthus sp. capturing prey

European beewolf carrying a honeybee to its tunnel

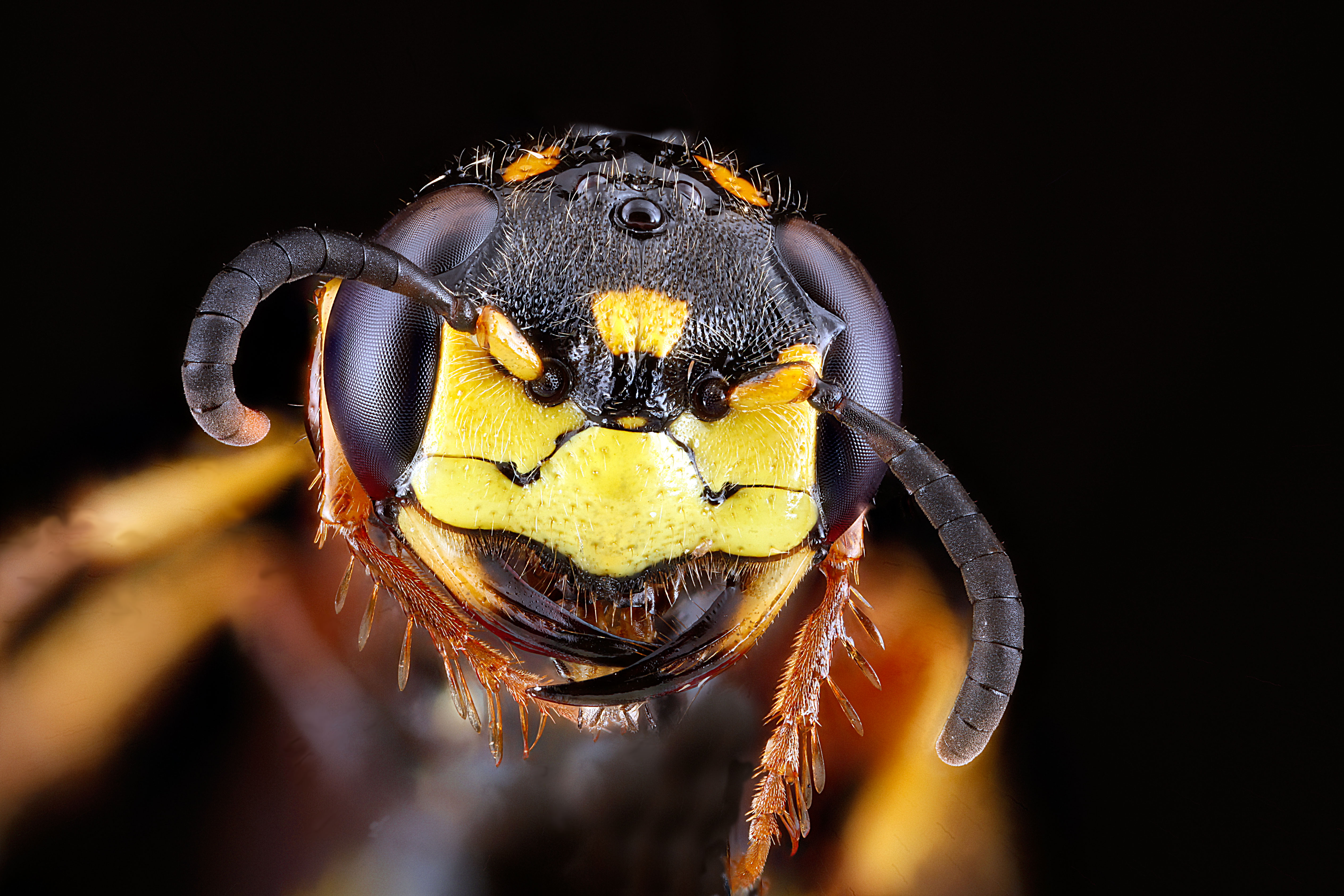
Philanthus gibbosus

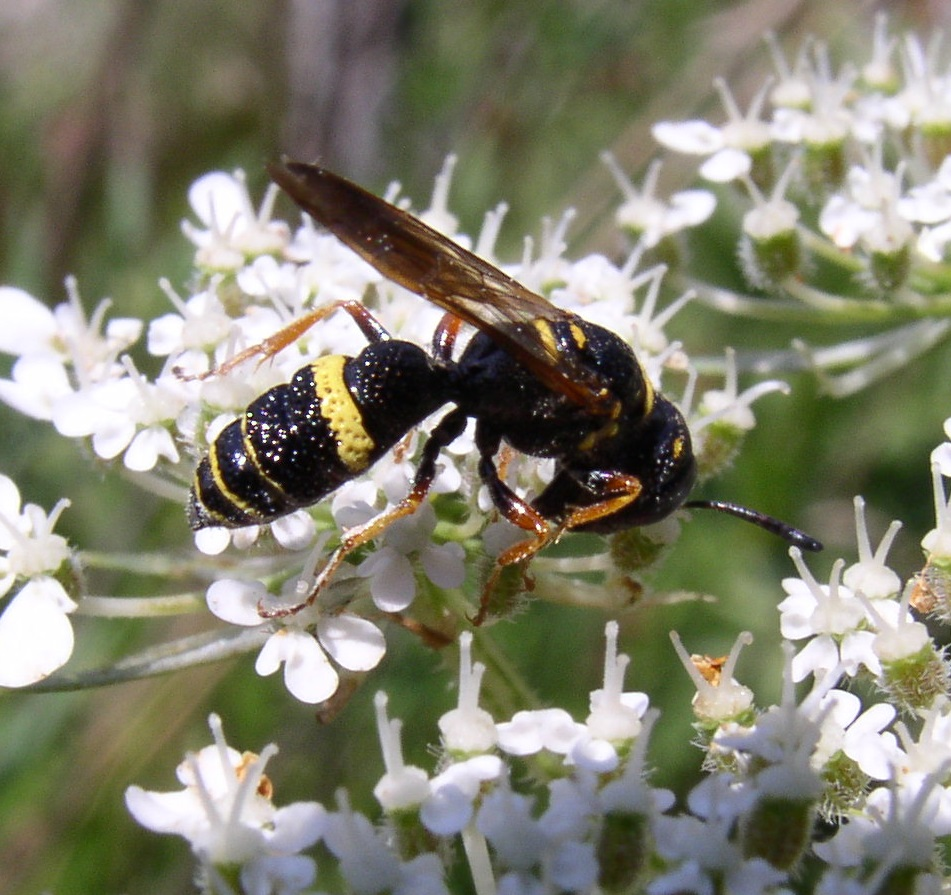
Philanthus gibbosus

== See also ==
- List of Philanthus species
