= Wild edible plants of Israel and Palestine =

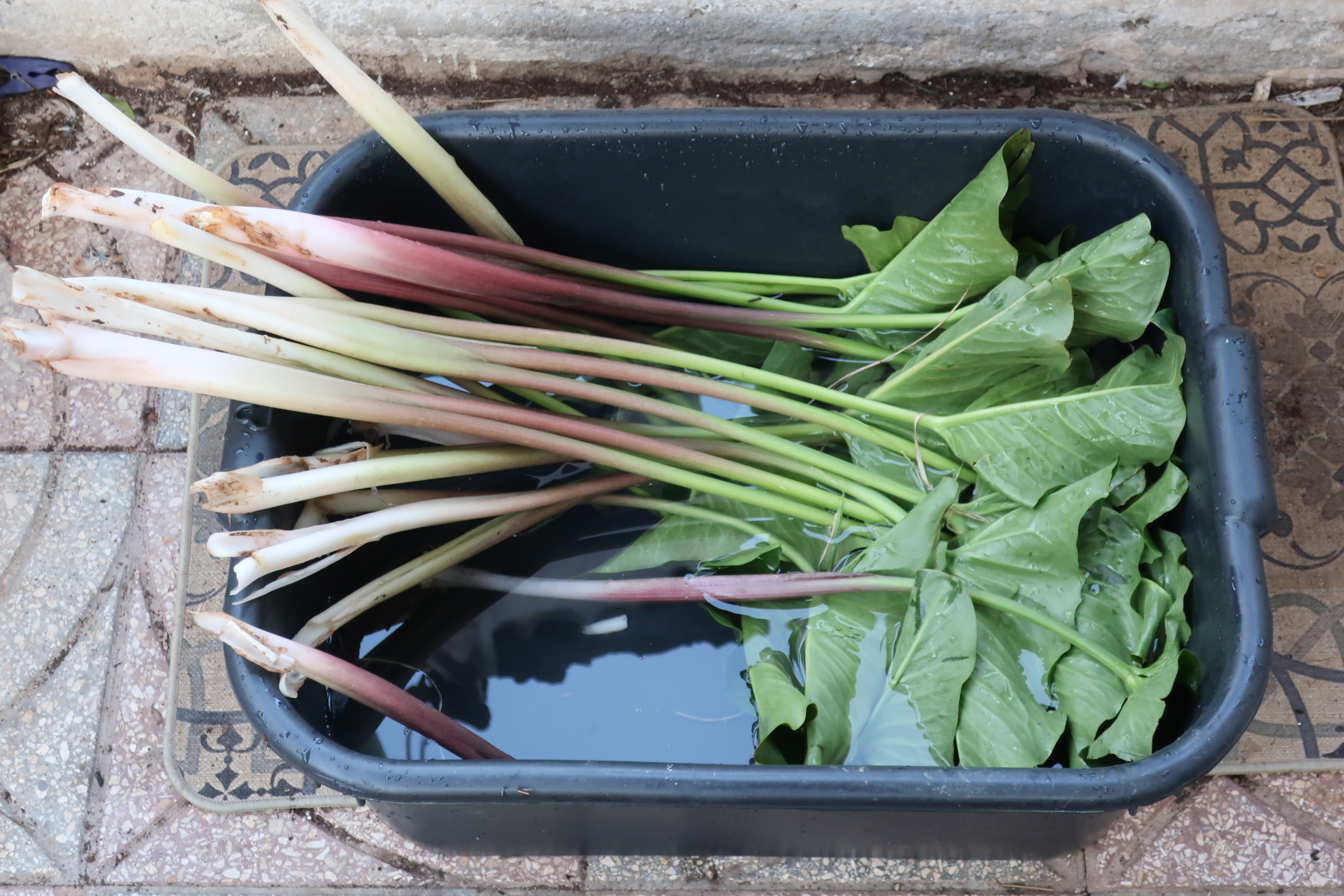
Arum palaestinum

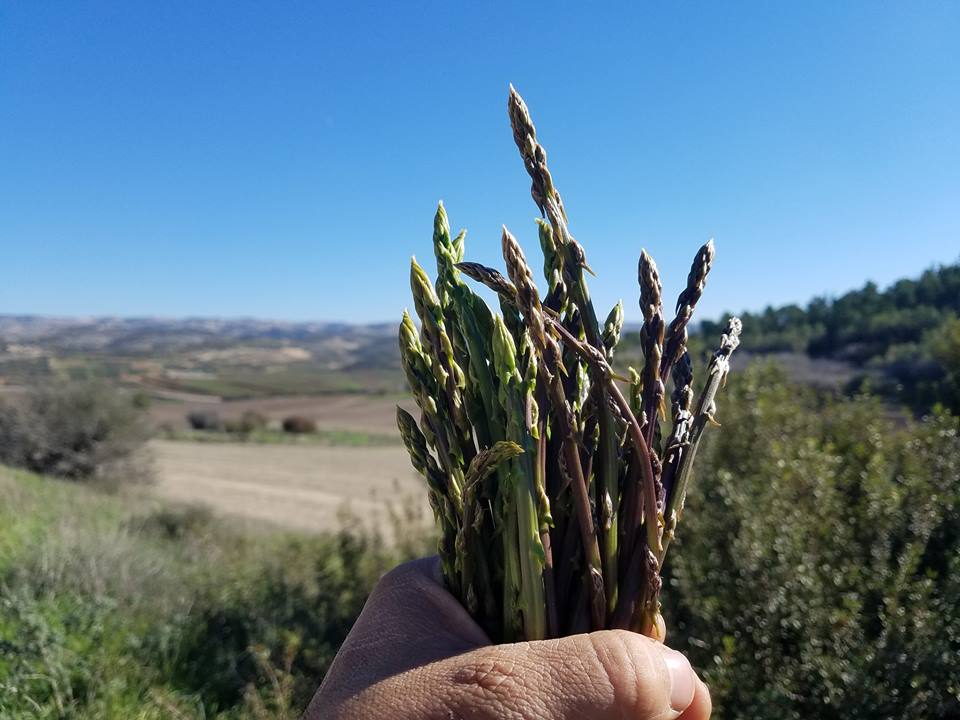
Asparagus aphyllus

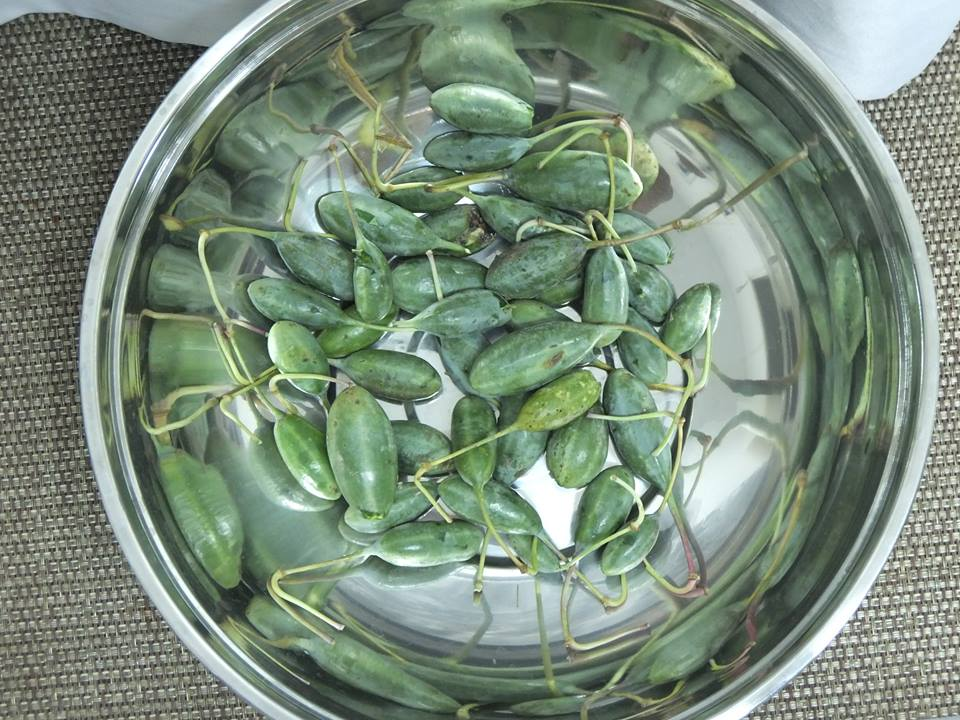
Capparis spinosa

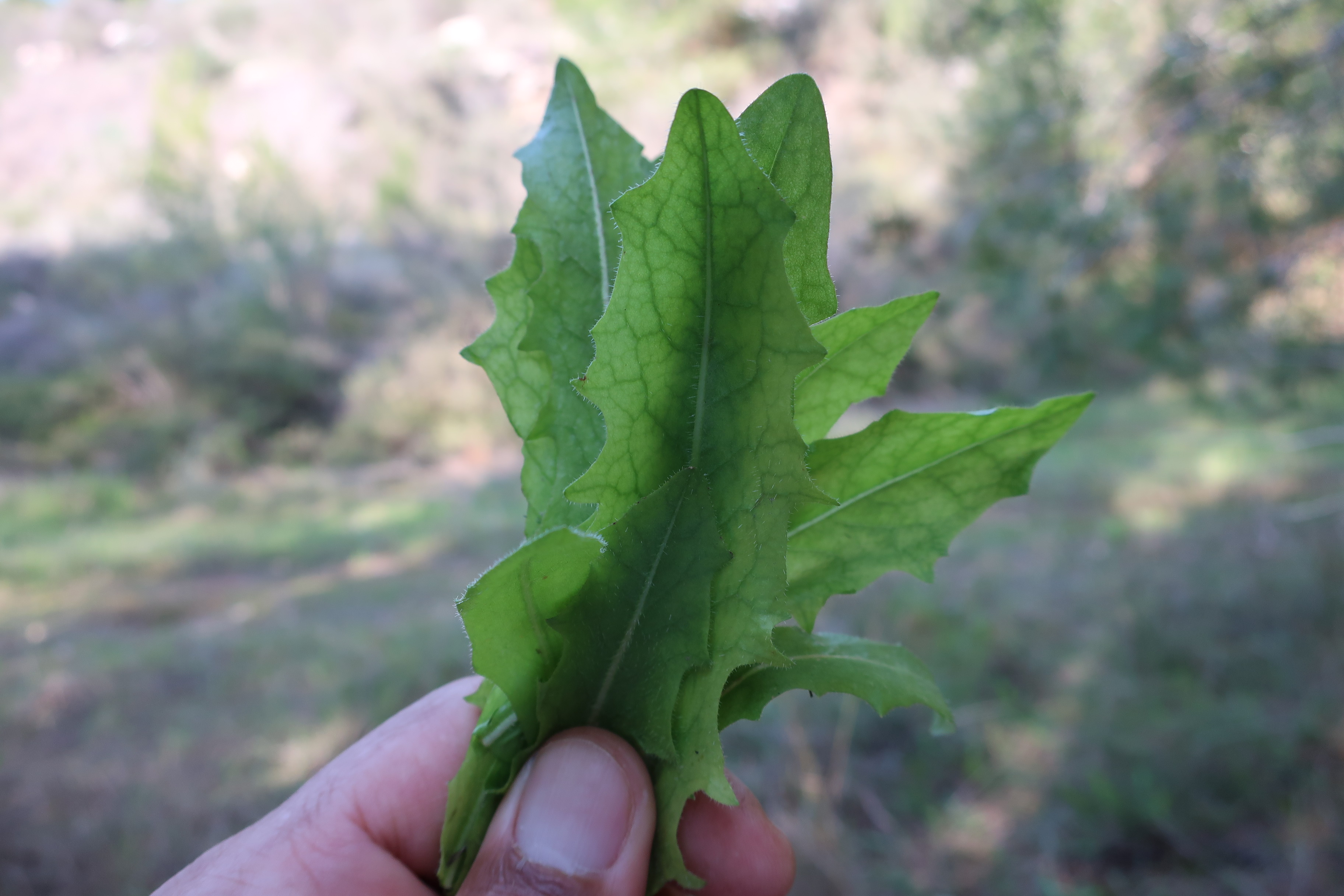
Lactuca serriola

Wild edible plants and fungi in the region of Israel and Palestine have been used to sustain life in periods of scarcity and famine, or else simply used as a supplementary food source for additional nourishment and pleasure. The diverse flora of the region offers a wide range of plants suitable for human consumption, many of which have a long history of usage in the daily cuisines of its native peoples.

The local population has traditionally made use of these plants, which they gathered for human consumption, whether to be eaten fresh or by steeping them in hot water, or by cooking, or by making use of them as a spice or condiment. All plants herein named are without regulation and can be utilised by the public, unless otherwise noted as protected under Israeli law. Such legislation has been a source of conflict (see for example Za'atar#Cultural and political significance).

== History of foraging ==
The flora of Israel consists of roughly 2,272 species from 128 families and 775 genera. Fungi such as truffles can be found in mycorrhizal relationships with other endemic plants, primarily helianthemum. In Palestine (the West Bank and Gaza), there are ~2780 recorded plant taxa. Ethnobotanical studies of the West Bank region document 100 wild edible plant species, including Majorana syriaca (wild marjoram), scorzonera judaica (viper's grass), and Eryngium creticum, the latter of which is mentioned in the Mishnah as a 'sacred herb'.

In the Talmud, wild edible plants are called yerakot hasadeh ("field vegetables"), and they constituted an important food staple for those lacking the means to sustain irrigation for cultivated vegetables. Palestinian food culture preserved this ancient practice of foraging and cooking wild plants, reintroducing this knowledge to Israeli cuisine, so for example, gundelia ("tumble thistle"), is best known in Israel by its Arabic. Studies of the continued use of wild edibles among Palestinians in the West Bank for nutritional and medicinal purposes document a wide array of applications, with the stated aim of preserving this indigenous knowledge.

German orientalist Gustaf Dalman (1855–1941) stated of foraging in Palestine, "[as] for all plants, the young growths of spring are used; for the thistles usually only the core and the stem." Foraging requires careful identification to avoid handling and/or eating noxious species. Some edible plants have parts that are allergenic or unfit for any human consumption, while some may require cooking.

Wild plants, and the knowledge of how to identify them both in the wild and in family gardens where they will often spontaneously sprout, is an important part of Palestinian identity and the traditional agricultural practices preserved by the fellahin and bedouins of Palestine. The weeding of family gardens is generally overseen by elders with knowledge of which wild plants should not be removed, like za'atar for example, so they can be used as ingredients in traditional dishes and teas for nutritional and even medicinal purposes.

== Selected species ==
Herbs, grasses, fungi and shrubs

Edible species include herbs, grasses, fungi, shrubs, and trees.

=== Herbs, grasses, fungi and shrubs ===
Herbs, grasses, fungi and shrubs
| Species | Common name | Observations |
|---|---|---|
| Aizoon canariense | Canarian aizoon | (Hebrew: חייעד קנרי (Canarian hi-ad), Arabic: سَمْح shaḥm el-arḍ; ḥādāq; ḥudāk; samḥ) This low-lying desert plant, a woody annual, grows in the Judean desert westward of the Dead Sea and along the southeastern portions of the Negev as far as the Great Rift Valley. The Bedouins of Egypt's Eastern Desert collected the seeds and ground them to be cooked into a gruel. The leaves are eaten as a famine food. |
| Allium ampeloprasum | Wild leek | (Hebrew: שום גבוה (meaning tall garlic), Arabic: كُرّاث بَرِّي ( thūm; karāt berri; basal el-afriṭ; kurāth) The leaves are eaten as a fresh salad herb. The wild leek today is protected under Israeli law. |
| Allium neapolitanum | Naples garlic | (Hebrew: שום משולש (meaning triangular garlic), Arabic: الثوم البري thūm) This herb is commonly seen throughout the country in early Spring, and is easily recognised by its six-petaled white flowers, arranged in a cylindrical inflorescence, and having a triangular-like stem (bearing three angles). The fresh stems and roots are edible and can be eaten as a salad. A similar garlic is A. trifoliatum (Hirsute garlic), also very common in the country. |
| Amaranthus blitum | Blite; Wild amaranth; Goosefoot | (Hebrew: ירבוז מבריק (shiny/bright yarbuz) ; Arabic: إسفاناخ بري, جَرْبوز / يَرْبُوز yarbūz; jarbūz; tūbāq; zereejeh) An annual summer weed with broad, shiny leaves. The leaves can be cooked and eaten as famine food. A. retroflexus (redroot amaranth or pigweed) is also common. |
| Anchusa strigosa | Strigose buglose | (Hebrew:לשון-פר סמורה (meaning hairy cow's tongue), Arabic: لسان الثور الخشن lisān eth-thawr; ḥemḥam) Young leaf growths of spring are collected and then boiled. After boiling, the leaves are finely chopped and sautéed in oil and garlic, and used as a meat garnish or as a viand with eggs. The same applies to A. undulata, A. azurea, A. aegyptiaca, A. ovata, A. milleri, and Hormuzakia aggregata, which are all endemic to the country. |
| Apium graveolens | Wild celery; parsley | (Hebrew:כרפס ריחני (Perfumed karpas), Arabic: الكرفس البري؛ البقدونس kerafs) Although found in the wild, today the plant is largely cultivated. Found growing along water courses in the Hula Plain and low-lying regions of the Sea of Galilee, among other places. Care should be taken not to confuse it with Conium maculatum (poison hemlock), since the plants have similar leaves and umbels. In the wild, the mature stalks are too hard to be eaten, but the leaves are a staple in many soups, and occasionally baked with cheeses. They can be eaten raw in salad with pickles, or chopped for cooking. Another species that grows profusely in the Acco Plain is A. nodiflorum. |
| Artemisia judaica | Judean wormwood | (Hebrew:לענת יהודה (Juean la'ana), Arabic: مرارة marara, شيح يهودي shih yahudiun, baʻthrān; buʻaythrān; shīḥ) A tea is made by way of steeping the dried leaves of this desert shrub, and is thought to have medicinal properties. The same use is had with Artemisia herba-alba (white wormwood), although its aerial parts and roots are prepared as a decoction, and known locally by the name shīḥ. |
| Arum palaestinum | Arum | (Hebrew:לוף ארץ-ישראלי, Arabic: لُوف فلسطيني lūf falastini) The leaves and tubers are edible after they have been leached (Note: Today, the leaves and roots of this plant are leached by boiling them several times in water that has been mixed with citric acid and with vinegar, accompanied with a thorough rinsing at the end.) of their toxins. The Mishnah mentions the plant's cultivation and use as food. Theophrastus also cites it in his Enquiry into Plants, describing the necessity of leaching the roots and leaves before they can be eaten. Typically, the cooked leaves and roots are eaten with rice. Ḳrispil names other genera of plants having the same properties as arum, viz., Arisarum vulgare and Eminium spiculatum, while Dalman adds another species, Arum dioscoridis (Spotted arum). |
| Asparagus aphyllus | Prickly asparagus | (Hebrew: אספרג החורש (Maquis asparag), Arabic: هليون عديم الأوراق ḥalēyūn) The young shoots of the plant are cut down, cooked in boiling water, flavored with lemon juice and salt and eaten. In some places, the custom is to roast them in hot-ashes over the ṭābūn baking oven. |
| Astoma seselifolium | Common astoma | (Hebrew: אסתום מצוי, Arabic: أستوما سيسليفوليوم, balbeson; balbelūs) Common in the Judaean Mountains, stems and leaves eaten fresh as a garden vegetable. The plant's bulbous roots are also edible and may be eaten fresh, or made more palatable by either cooking or roasting them over a fire. A salad was made by adding to a bowl a layer of spring onions, followed by a layer of the bulbous root of astoma, a dash of salt, water and zaʻtar (oregano). The roots have a sweet taste and are fragranced in the months April, May and June. |
| Atriplex halimus | Shrubby saltbush; orache | (Arabic: القَطَف qaṭaf; gaṭaf), Hebrew: מלוח קיפח (Tall malu'ach). The tender, mucilaginous leaves of this shrub are edible and can be eaten either fresh in a salad or boiled, but also can be fried with eggs, or simply fried with a dash of olive oil, water and chopped bulb onions. The Bedouins would frequently eat the leaves after boiling and mixing them with sour goats' milk, or yogurt. The shrub is common all along the Jordan River valley, and its genus includes many other species. |
| Beta vulgaris | Chard; White beet | (Hebrew: סלק מצוי, Arabic: السلق؛ الشمندر الأبيض silq; siliq berri) A leafy vegetable whose young leaves can be added raw to salads, whilst the mature leaves are most commonly served boiled or steamed, in which case they have a taste and texture similar to spinach. The leaves are traditionally consumed in cooked food, but also as stuffed foods (with filling). |
| Biscutella didyma | Buckler mustard | (Hebrew: מצלתיים מצויות, Arabic: بيسكوتيلا ديديما drehēme) An edible herb belonging to the mustard family and mentioned by Alois Musil as being eaten raw by the Bedouins. The plant is common in Israel and Palestine and bears a fruit resembling a buckle, with two discs joined. In each disc there is one seed. |
| Brassica tournefortii | Tournefort's mustard | (Hebrew: כרוב החוף (meaning shoreline cabbage) Arabic: خردل khardal or sufayr; shirtim) Seeds and tender leaves of plant can be used as a spice in salads. Grows primarily in sandy soils along the coastal plains. |
| Capparis spinosa | Caper-bush | (Hebrew: צלף קוצני (Thorny tzalaf), Arabic: الكَپَر الشوكي qabbār, el-aṣaf laṣaf) Caper flower buds (before they begin to blossom) and fruits (cucumber-like berries) are pickled and eaten. Caper leaves are part of the Greek cuisine In Israel and Palestine, caper buds and berries were often pickled in a brine of salt water and spices, while the caper leaves were used as a spice. The tender green branches and leaves can also be pickled and eaten. |
| Capsella bursa-pastoris | Shepherd's purse | (Hebrew: ילקוט הרועים (meaning Shepherd's purse), Arabic: كيس الراعي kis alraaei, snēnwe; kīs el-raʻī; kharfaq; snūnje) Tender leaves primarily used as a spice to flavor salads, but can also be eaten raw or steamed. An infusion made from its leaves is also used medicinally among the Bedouins of the Negev, especially as a cure in stomach-ache. Older leaves and seed capsules develop a peppery taste and are used as a food flavoring. |
| Carrichtera annua | Annual carrichtera | (Hebrew: כפיות שעירות (meaning hairy spoons) Arabic: كاريتشيترا الحولية karitshitra alhawlia) A branched herb endemic to the Negev and Judean desert whose leaves and stems are edible. Although edible, the plant is covered with small, white erectile hairs, making it unpleasant to the touch. |
| Chiliadenus iphionoides (Varthemia iphionoides) | Goldy-locks | (Arabic: أرتيميا إيفيون 'artimya 'iifiunoides, kenēdeh; shtēleh; slīmānī) A low-lying shrub common all throughout the country and growing on rocky ground. Its sweet-smelling, pungent leaves are added as a spice to flavor cooking meat and soup. A tea concoction can also be made from the leaves by steeping them in hot water (without boiling). |
| Cichorium endivia (C. pumilum) | Dwarf chicory | (Arabic: الهندباء القزمة hindeba; ʻilt; ʻilk; ʻilsh; sikōria) Young tender leaves chopped and fried with onions and garlic, and a pinch of salt. Cooked with lentils. Eaten fresh as a salad with beets and lemon juice. C. endivia (syn. C. pumilum) is the only chicory native to the country, and is numbered among the bitter herbs that can be eaten by Israel during the Passover ritual. The larger the leaves grow, the bitterer they become. Best when picked in the early Spring before the plant blossoms. The Arab population of Galilee have traditionally used it in stuffed foods. Roasted chicory roots have been used as a substitute for coffee. |
| Cistanche tubulosa | Desert broomrape | (Arabic: سيستانشي توبولوسا sistanshi tubulusa (dhunūn; halūq; zib el-ʻabīd) A parasytic desert plant whose roots are eaten by the Bedouins of the Negev and Sinai. After washing, the roots were laid upon live coals in an open fire pit to be roasted. |
| Corchorus olitorius; C. trilocularis | Jew's Mallow | (Arabic: ملوخية melūkhīye) Leaves chopped and cooked in a skillet, with a little water, a dash of olive oil, salt, black pepper, chopped garlic, parsley and bulb onions. Grows wild all along the Jordan River valley, around Afulah and along the Sea of Galilee. C. trilocularis is already an endangered species in Israel. |
| Coriandrum sativum | Wild coriander | (Arabic: كزبرة kūsbara; Hebrew: kūsbara) An herb found mostly in the mountainous regions of the country, whose tender green leaves are used as a spice in other foods and vegetables. The plant is mentioned in the Mishnah (Shevi'it 9:1) as being one of several herbs and plants that usually grow of their own in the wild, although they are utilised as food. |
| Crithmum maritimum | Sea fennel; Rock samphire | (Arabic: شمرة البحر؛ shūmera baḥriya, ḥashīsh al-baḥar) Fleshy leaves often eaten as a relish when pickled in either olive oil or in salt. Grows wild along the Mediterranean sea coast. The leaves contain a high-level of vitamin C; when eaten fresh they have a slightly sour and salty taste, but when cooked the taste resembles parsley, or that of celery. The best time for picking the leaves is the month of May, when the leaves are tender and not so salty. |
| Crocus hyemalis | Winter crocus; saffron | (Arabic: shuḥēm; zaʻfarān; bizzēz; baṭāṭ el-faqīr; sirāj el-ghūle) One of the first flowers to bloom after the first winter rains (usually blooming in December and January), and easily recognized by their white petals. Although protected by law, the bulbs of the flower were dug-up and collected to be eaten by the poor after cooking or roasting, whence it derives its Arabic name baṭāṭ el-faqīr ("poor man's potato"). The stigmas of the flowers were, formerly, collected at a time when there was no dew and later dried in special drying ovens for about a quarter-of-an-hour while laid over sieves made of goats' hair, or else over hot coals, and then taken-up and spread out to cool for about half an hour. (Note: If the flowers are harvested for their saffron spice, it takes approximately 150 flowers to produce one gram of saffron spice, derived from their stigmas. In some countries, the crocus flower is harvested only in the early morning hours, before the petals had time to fully open by the sun's rays. The three stigmas are then removed from each flower and, once collected, are laid out to dry in a warm room. The window of opportunity for harvesting the crocus flower is short-lived, as the flower will soon wither as the season progresses.) After which, they are stored in sealed jars to be used as a food coloring and as a spice. |
| Cyclamen persicum | Persian cyclamen | (Arabic: zaʻmaṭūṭ; sābūnet er-rāʻī; ʻaṣā er-rāʻī; bakhkhūr maryam; qarn el-ghazāl) Arab peasants in Palestine have traditionally made use of cyclamen leaves as a food ingredient. The leaves are first boiled and filled with rice, minced meat, finely chopped onions and other condiments, and made into rolls - similar to the manner in which grape-vine leaves are used, (Note: The manner in which grape-vine leaves are prepared with rice is as follows: 1) Soak leaves in boiling hot water to soften, appx. 15 minutes (choose only the thinnest leaves); 2) Fill with uncooked rice (first rinse the rice); 3) Add spices to rice: turmeric, black pepper, salt, dried mint leaves, raisins, finely chopped dill, parsley and green onions (scallions); 4) Roll in leaves first by folding the three-sides and then rolling like a sleeping-bag; 5) Place in pot with a little water and oil (water, oil and lemon juice, filled to a height just above the grape leaves); 6) Cover pot with lid. First bring to a boil, then lower heat; 7) Cook over low heat. The Arabs have a practice to place the fatty tail of a sheep (Heb. אליה) on top of the grape leaves while cooking, so that the melted fat is absorbed in the rice and leaves; in this manner it imparts its good flavor.) before being cooked and eaten. Others prefer stuffing the blanched cyclamen leaves with wheat groats and cooked lentils, seasoned with honey, cumin, salt and black pepper. The dark-brown bulbous root of this plant is poisonous unto animals. However, the plant's leaves are harmless unto man when consumed by him. The taste is said to resemble that of cooked grape leaves. The plant has the status of "protected" under the laws of the state. |
| Cynomorium coccineum | Scarlet broom-rape | (Arabic: masrūr; ṭōrṭūṭ; zīb al-arḍ) Growing in the Negev and in the Sinai Peninsula, this unique parasitic plant feeds on the roots of other host plants, and was occasionally eaten on long journeys by Bedouins, who would clean and peel the fresh spikes and eat the crisp white interior, which is said to be succulent and sweet, with a flavour of apples and a pleasantly astringent effect. Dalman mentions a species of broom rape (Philipaea lutea) whose roots were grated and used to sweeten milk. The desert plant here mentioned is protected under Israeli law. |
| Daucus carota | Wild carrot | (Arabic: jāzer; bēlisān) A close relative of the cultivated carrot, the yellow-white roots of which plant were sometimes collected, boiled and eaten by the peasantry of the country. |
| Diplotaxis erucoides | White wall-rocket | (Arabic: ḥwērre; saʻesʻa; ḥarra) Leaves, flowers and pods are all eaten as a salad herb, or used as a spice. For salads, only the young and tender stems and leaves are selected. According to Krispil, the tender leaves of this plant were soaked in 1 liter of milk for one day, the milk then put through a sieve and drunk on an empty stomach. A hefty hand-full of fresh leaves can be mixed with crushed garlic, lemon juice, dash of salt and black pepper, chopped parsley with a little olive oil and 1 cup of water. Other species that grown in the Negev are the coarse rocket (Diplotaxis harra), whose flowers are eaten, and the desert rocket (Diplotaxis acris), known by the Arabic name yahag and appearing after the first winter rains, whose flowers and leaves are eaten. |
| Rumex spinosa | Spiny dock; Devil's thorn | (Arabic: irkēbeh; irkaybah; rukbah; ḥabidhān) A prostrate annual with broad, semi-fleshy leaves and containing a taproot resembling a carrot, but shorter and white in color. Tender roots are edible, collected in winter and eaten by Bedouins, either raw or after roasting. |
| Enarthrocarpus strangulatus | Resort necklace | (Arabic: shilwē; shilwih) A branched annual herb whose low-growing stems and leaves are boiled, strained, and put on bread. The herb is common to the Negev. |
| Erodium crassifolium (E. hirtum) | Desert stork's-bill | (Arabic: tumēr; ibret el-raʻī) A perennial desert geophyte common in the Negev and the Judean desert. Leaves are edible, but especially the fresh, underground white bulb (corm) of the plant (from recent year's growth, rather than the previous year's growth which is reddish in color). The corm of the stork's-bill is not symmetrical and round, but horny and crooked; best when sautéed in olive oil, with chopped onions, garlic, black-pepper and other spices. Water in which flowers of the plant have been steeped is used to soften the skin. |
| Erucaria microcarpa (Reboudia pinnata) | Pink-mustard | (Arabic: slēḥ; slīḥ ʻādī) Stem, flowers and leaves are eaten raw. Best when prepared with tomatoes and lemon juice. Other species of pink-mustard native to the country are the Sand pink-mustard (Erucaria rostrata), common to the Negev and Judean desert where it is known as slīḥ ḥadharī, and the Spanish pink-mustard (Erucaria hispanica). |
| Eruca sativa | Garden rocket; arugula | (Arabic: ḥardan; gergīr; jerjīr) This wild annual herb is common throughout the country, but can be found more profusely growing along the Jordan River Valley. The herb is eaten fresh and in salads, or with bread-rolls and cheese. Gergīr recalls the biblical story in 2 Kings 4:39, where a certain famished man went into the field to pick oroth [herbs], and which Hebrew word is explained by Rabbi Johanan as meaning gergīr. In the Arabic dialect spoken in Palestine in Dalman's time, both, Eruca sativa (rocket) and Nasturtium officinale (watercress) were called gergīr. |
| Eryngium creticum | Field eryngo | (Arabic: kurṣeʻanne) Although a thorny plant when fully grown, it produces terminal clusters of tender leaves that are edible when young, though somewhat bitter. Tender leaves eaten as salad, having the taste of parsley. The root is also palatable. There are two different stages of development: the young stage in which the leaves are green and large and edible, and the mature stage in which the plant becomes thorny without any resemblance to its first appearance. |
| Foeniculum vulgare | Fennel | (Arabic: شُومَر shūmmar; shōmar; Hebrew: shūmmar;) Stems and tender leaves of the common fennel are used principally as a spice to flavor cooked dishes, as well as an additive in preserved foodstuffs and in alcoholic beverages. A tea can also be produced from the seeds of fennel. |
| Frankenia revoluta | Sea-heath | (Arabic: qermel; milīḥī) Leaves are used as a condiment for flavoring clarified butter. Another species of sea-heath endemic to the country is Powdery sea-heath (Frankenia pulverulenta). |
| Geranium tuberosum | Bulbous crane's bill | (Arabic: إبرة الراعي الدرنية ibret er-raʻī al-daraniyyeh) The tubers of this plant are edible, usually growing deep in the earth and reaching a length of 25 cm. Best when eaten after roasting in fire. Today, the plant is protected under Israeli law. |
| Glycyrrhiza echinata | Prickly licorice | (Arabic: عرقسوس ʻarq es-sūs; sūs) A perennial whose sweet, dried and crushed root is used to produce the licorice spice, used in flavoring liquors and other drinks. A refreshing soft-drink called in Arabic sūs was made from its root, with sugar and lemon. In Israel and Palestine, the plant is common in the Sharon plain, the Hula Valley, the areas around Beit She'an and the Sea of Galilee. The only other wild licorice plant in the country is G. glabra (common liquorice), bearing non-thorny fruit and growing along the Jordan River Valley and the eastern banks of the Sea of Galilee. Of the two species, only G. glabra is protected under Israeli law. |
| Gundelia tournefortii | Tumble thistle | (Arabic: ʻakkūb; kaʻūb; shamrūkh; jemalīye) Early in the year, Gundelia is recognised by its prominent red midriff running down the middle of its stems and leaves. Later, in late summer, when the plants turn a greyish-white, plants growing in the wild are cut at the base and the thorns are removed. Leaves, stems, roots, and particularly the undeveloped flowerheads can be eaten. The base of the young leaves which is still under the surface is used by Bedouin and Arabs to make akkub soup. In the West Bank, young flowerheads, stems and leaves are fried in olive oil, mixed with a stew of meat chops until well done, and served mixed with yogurt. Gundelia is said to taste like something between asparagus and artichoke. The earliest known mentions of this plant are in the Mishna (Uktzin 3:2), in Midrash Rabba (Genesis Rabba, s.v. קוץ ודרדר יצמח לך), (Note: According to local Jewish tradition, the history of foraging of this thorny plant dates back to the first man, Adam, whom after God had cursed and caused two species of thistle, qōṣ and dardar in Genesis 3:18, to spring-up from the ground, the same plants were given to him as food – had at leisure, along with his bread procured by his own sweat.) and in the Babylonian Talmud (Betza 34a). Today, the Tumble thistle is protected under Israeli law. |
| Hordeum spontaneum | Wild barley | (Arabic: shaʻir eḥṣeinī; zraʻ sāneh) A wild grain that grows profusely throughout all the country, and reaching mature growth in late Spring (around May). When fully dry, the seed kernels with their awns fall from the spikes when only slightly disturbed. Best to reap the stalks of wild barley when they are still green and intact. Wild barley is often seen growing where wild mustard grows. (Note: Before the invention of machines, the husks of cultivated barley grown in Yemen (Hordeum distichon) were removed from the kernels of barley in the following manner: The harvested barley with their husks were soaked in water for a short while, afterwards spread out over a flat area for the time it takes for them to only semi-dry. They were then taken up, the damp kernels with their husks, and put within either a large skillet or convex metal griddle (saj) where they were only half-roasted (turning constantly). At this stage, they were taken out and placed within a large earthenware vessel sunken partly into the ground (allowing for the vessel to be firmly fixed and not break on account of the work), where people with clean feet would stomp upon the barley and press upon it with their bare feet, until the husks fell off from the barley kernels. The kernels were then sifted from their husks and could then be either completely roasted, or ground into flour.) The husks (chaff) of the wild barley grown in the Land of Israel (Palestine) are, in some cases, tediously peeled away by hand to expose the seed kernel. A faster method was to reap green barley and to slightly singe the spikes over a flame of fire. The spikes were then placed on a flat board and forcibly rubbed thereon to remove the kernels of grain from the spikes. Although the chaff still adheres to the grain, they were inserted in a pot of boiling water to be cooked as bulgur (groats) with a soup. The husks (chaff) would fall-off after boiling. In some places, barley is ground and roasted with oil or sheep fat. |
| Lactuca serriola | Broom lettuce | (Arabic: khass berri; khass el-ḥimār) The most common of the wild lettuce that grows in the country, beginning in winter and early Spring. The tender leaves can be eaten fresh or cooked in hot dishes. The plant is listed among the bitter herbs that can be eaten on the night of Passover. |
| Lamium amplexicaule | Common henbit | (Arabic: fūm es-sammaqah) The herb's young leaves, shoots, and flowers can be eaten, either raw or cooked. The shoots and stems are said to have a slightly sweet and peppery flavor. |
| Lathyrus blepharicarpus | Ciliate vetchling | (Arabic: jilbāne) These wild peas are edible and eaten either raw or cooked. The same applies to the other species of vetchling (Lathyrus spp.) growing in Israel and Palestine. The L. blepharicarpus species is prevalent all throughout the mountainous districts of the country. The species that grows along the coastal plains is L. marmoratus, while the principal vetchling that grows in Upper Galilee is L. sessilifolius. Some 15 species of Lathyrus have been named in the country. |
| Launaea nudicaulis | Bold-leaf launaea | (Arabic: el-ḥuwwaia; ḥuwwī) A desert annual growing close to the ground, with leaves concentrated at the base of the plant. The leaves are collected and eaten. The plant is commonly found in the Negev and in the Judean Desert. |
| Lepidium latifolium | Wild cress; pepperweed | (Arabic: rashād berri; ḥarafraf; qisṭ) A tall perennial herb that grows alongside natural springs and salt flats in the coastal plains and in the northern valleys, especially the Hula Plain. Its leaves are boiled and eaten, but which some will practice leaching before its final cooking to remove its pungent and sharp taste. Other species that grow in Israel and Palestine include L. spinosum (Prickly pepperwort) and L. spinescens, the former of which grows in packed soil in the Golan Heights, and in places in Upper and Lower Galilee. |
| Lotus edulis | lotus | (Hebrew: lotūs; Arabic: lotūs; jelathōn; sībʻah) This herb is now mostly rare in Israel and Palestine, except in Mount Carmel and the Carmel coast. It bears a large seed pod, containing tasty, round edible seeds. Dalman also spoke of a similar plant, whose green seed pods are edible, namely, L. palaestinus, a synonym for Lotus tetragonolobus subsp. palaestinus (Asparagus pea), a plant whose edible seed pod was harvested between March and May. The seeds are eaten raw. |
| Lupinus pilosus | Blue lupine | (Arabic: tūrmūs) The seeds are edible after they are first leached by boiling them in hot water, a process that is repeated several times, with the water being discarded after each boil. Blue lupine grows in the mountainous regions of Israel and Palestine, and is a plant protected by Israeli law because of its exquisite beauty. Other species endemic to Israel and Palestine include L. palaestinus (Palestine lupine) and which is not protected by law, and L. luteus (Yellow lupine), and L. angustifolius (Narrow-leaved lupine). The three species grow in the Sharon Plain, with the last species also found in the Golan Heights. |
| Malva nicaeensis; M. sylvestris | Common mallow | (Arabic: khubēzza; khuṭmi) Leaves chopped and cooked in a skillet, with a little water, a dash of olive oil, salt, chopped garlic and onions. The same applies to all the Malva spp. growing in the country. This herb makes for a delectable garnish used in food stuffing, since they are not bitter at all. Dalman writes in his description of the plant that, "in Palestine, the leaves [are] cut up and cooked with cooking butter and water, [and] seasoned with lemon or pepper." Others prepare the cooked mallows with lentils or tomatoes. Among the mallows native to the country is Lavatera cretica (Cretan mallow). Excellent with scrambled eggs. |
| Matricaria aurea | Golden chamomile | (Arabic: babūnij) Grows primarily in the Judean mountains and in the Judean desert, but can be seen in other parts of the country, as far as Galilee, and is used as an herbal infusion for teas. Today, the Golden chamomile is protected by Israeli law. Another species is M. recutita (Blue chamomile) which grows primarily in the Upper Galilee and in the Hula alluvial plain. |
| Matthiola livida | Desert stock | (Arabic: mantūr; shugayrih; fajīlī) This genus of the mustard family is marked by several species in the country, among which being M. aspera, M. arabica (known in Arabic by the name ḥumḥum), and M. tricuspidata. The flowers and stems are edible. |
| Medicago laciniata | Cut-leaf medick | (Arabic: ḥandagūg ḥadharī; ʻarebiyān; khubaz el-raʻī) A beverage (tea) can be made from the plant's stems and leaves when boiled in water, with sugar added. The plant grows widely throughout the Negev. Other species of Medicago, such as M. orbicularis, can also be used for preparing tea. |
| Mentha longifolia (Mentha sylvestris) | Horse mint | (Arabic: naʻnaʻ; ḥabaq; naʻnaʻt el-qana, Hebrew: naʻnaʻ;) A wild mint found along the watercourses throughout the country, usually growing in clusters. Both dried and fresh leaves used in preparing a tea. Horse mint is also known for its medicinal properties. |
| Mesembryanthemum nodiflorum | Egyptian fig-marigold; iceplant | (Arabic: shnīn; samḥ; semeḥ) A desert plant found in the Negev and the Judean desert. The plant produces many small black seeds which are released after the first rainfall. The Bedouins would traditionally collect the small black seeds of this plant, dry them and grind them, and then knead the resultant flour with water and bake the dough into bread. To this would be added a dash of sesame seeds and salt. After stripping off the seed capsules, the Bedouins would hasten the release of the seeds by immersing the capsules in water where they are stirred until they open and the seeds fall to the bottom. The flour, kneaded with dates and clarified butter is eaten raw. |
| Micromeria fruticosa | Thyme-leaved savory | (Arabic: qūrnīye; ʻisbat a-shai; zuʻtemān) Growing mainly on chalkstone and caliche rocks, a decoction made from the leaves of this aromatic plant is a favorite amongst tea drinkers. The leaves can either be fresh or dried. The chopped leaves are also used as a spice in salty foods. In the Hebron area, the people had a practice to spread the stems and leaves of Thyme-leaved savory over the stone platform used by them to dry out figs, so as to impart the plant's fragrance to the dried figs. Although disputed, some scholars think this plant to be the koranit of the Mishnah. |
| Moricandia nitens | Shining moricandia | (Arabic: ḥamēmeh; aḥmīm) A semi-shrub that grows in the Negev at the foot of limestone cliffs and in the ravines of the watercourses. Its young leaves and flowering buds are harvested and eaten. |
| Muscari commutatum | Grape hyacinth | (Arabic: bulbūs) The plant's bulbous roots are eaten fresh as a garden herb, or can be boiled and eaten with vinegar, oil, and garum. In the Levant they are known as "bulbus." The other three species endemic to Israel and Palestine are M. neglectum, M. parviflorum, and M. inconstrictum. A similar bulbous plant is Leopoldia comosa. (Note: The Grape hyacinth (Muscari commutatum) is endemic to Israel and Palestine; a pleasant flowering plant with bulbous roots that are eaten fresh or pickled after boiling several times (see Method of Preparing). The plant was formerly cultivated in the hill country of Judea, and used also as an ornamental or for use in perfume. Other species of the grape hyacinth endemic to Israel and Palestine are Muscari parviflorum and M. neglectum. The Arabic word is a Greek loanword, derived from βολβός, an edible bulbous plant described in Theophrastus' Enquiry into Plants. Cf. Bos, Gerrit [in German]; Käs, Fabian (2016). "Arabic Pharmacognostic Literature and Its Jewish Antecedents: Marwān ibn Ǧanāḥ (Rabbi Jonah), Kitāb al-Talḫīṣ". Aleph. 16 (1). Indiana University Press: 218 (note 156). doi:10.2979/aleph.16.1.145. JSTOR 10.2979/aleph.16.1.145. S2CID 171046217., s.v. tassel hyacinth.) |
| Nasturtium officinale | True water-cress | (Arabic: qūrāt el-ʻaīn; rashād; jerjīr; qarra) Where there is an abundance of water, this plant is plenteous, especially along natural springs and small rivulets. The leaves of the water-cress are edible and have the taste and smell of a pungent-smelling radish. |
| Notobasis syriaca | Syrian thistle | (Arabic: khūrfēsh; khūrfesh el-ḥamīr) The core and stems of this thistle are mostly eaten raw, but the leafstalks can also be eaten, either fresh in a salad or cooked, after removing the thorns. The plant is widely spread throughout the country, and is at its zenith of blossoming in April. |
| Onobrychis crista-galli | Cock's comb; Sainfoin | (Arabic: dhūrēs; dhurays) The seedpods of this plant are edible. A similar plant whose seedpods are eaten is the Crested sainfoin (Onobrychis squarrosa). A related species whose seed resembles an irregular, flat disc is the Ptolemaic sainfoin (Onobrychis ptolemaica), native to the eastern Negev. |
| Orchis spp. | Orchids | (Hebrew: saḥlab;; Arabic: saḥlab; qarn el-ghazāl) The salep hot drink was traditionally made by extracting its flavor from the dried corms (tubers) of this plant. The salep powder was then added to milk before it reached boiling temperature, stirred constantly, unto which cornstarch was added as a thickening agent, along with sugar and eggs. The hot drink is often flavored, after cooling, with ground cinnamon, raisins, shredded coconut and an orange extract. All of the wild orchids in the country, today, are protected under Israeli law, although commercially produced salep (stores of a pre-packaged kind) can still be had. |
| Origanum syriacum (Majorana syriaca) | Oregano; Wild marjoram | (Arabic: zaʻtar; Hebrew: זעתר;) Perhaps the most celebrated herb in Israel and Palestine, insofar that foraging parties were often sent out to collect the herb, before it was protected under Israeli law. The herbal stalks with their leaves are dried, after which the leaves are broken off and crushed and used as a spice in many cuisines, but mostly eaten as a spice on breads with crushed garlic, chopped cayenne peppers, and a dash of olive-oil. It is added to the chickpea pastes (hummus), as well as other garnishes and pastes. In some places, the fresh leaves are added as a spice in tea. |
| Orobanche cernua | Nodding broomrape | (Arabic: jaʻafīl; ḥalūq; tarthūth) The root of this plant is roasted and eaten. Other native species include the Scalloped broomrape (Orobanche crenata) and Mutel's broomrape (Orobanche mutelii). |
| Oxalis pes-caprae | Nodding wood-sorrel | (Arabic: ḥamāḍ; ḥummēseh) An edible herb whose green stems are often chewed by children for their mildly sour, lemon-like taste. The nodding wood sorrel, although now widespread in the country, is thought to be an invasive specie. The plant can be used to neutralise the toxins in arum when cooked together with arum. |
| Piptatherum holciforme | Hairy ricegrass | (Hebrew: esef-orez, עשב אורז; Arabic: el-jāwars; dukhn; sanām) A type of wild millet. Seeds are ground into meal to be cooked with either curdled milk or regular goat's milk and made into a farinaceous dish. The porridge is sweetened according to taste. A similar species in the country is Piptatherum blancheanum (Hebrew: נשרן מכחיל), growing at the edge of tree groves in the Mediterranean region. |
| Pisum sativum (P. fulvum) | Wild pea | (Arabic: burrēde; bāzella alya; bāzēlia) Peas in pods eaten raw while still green or either cooked after ripening. Other species of wild pea in Israel include P. elatius (Tall wild pea). and P. fulvum (Yellow wild pea) |
| Pituranthos tortuosus (Deverra tortuosa) | Desert dill | (Arabic: zagūḥ) An umbellifer having a strong scent of celery when leaves and stems are crushed between one's fingers. The essential oils of the leaves of this desert plant are used as a condiment in tea. The leaves and stems can also be used to flavor soups. |
| Portulaca oleracea | Garden purslane | (Arabic: farfaḥina; farfaḥin baqlī; baqlah; rijlah; baqlat el-ḥamqaʻ) A common herb that grows in well-irrigated fields and gardens, having succulent leaves. The plant is mentioned in the Mishnah (Shevi'it 9:1) as being one of several herbs and plants that usually grow of their own in the wild, although they are utilised as food. Among Arab fellahin, the leaves are prepared as a salad by chopping them small with either green onions or bulb onions, tomato paste, garlic, parsley, salt and other spices according to taste. Others add olive oil and vinegar. Another species of purslane that grows in the country is P. grandiflora and which is said to be more bitter. |
| Prasium majus | Great hedge-nettle | (Arabic: shāwfāl) Herbaceous plant bearing shiny, dark-green leaves and recognized principally by its purplish-black round fruit divided into sections, and which ripens in the summer. It grows in open woodlands, often in rocky places. The tender leaves and stems of the plant, which have a characteristic aroma and taste, are collected and consumed in stews, or added to complete the flavor of fried vegetables, as well as in vegetable pies containing meat, mushrooms and sundried tomatoes, or simply as a side dish of meat or of fish. The leaves are rich in vitamins C, E and K. |
| Pulicaria incisa (Pulicaria desertorum) | Undulate fleabane | (Arabic: rabil) A tea is made from an infusion of the plant's leaves. The same tea concoction can be made from the leaves of Pulicaria undulata, also native to Israel and Palestine, but care should be taken not to make the brew too strong, or else its taste will be like drinking warm turpentine. |
| Raphanus raphanistrum | Wild radish | (Arabic: fijl) This species of wild radish is mostly seen growing along the Sharon Plain along the coastal regions. The green, elongated pods protruding from the stems are collected, chopped and eaten as a salad. The leaves are best when they are picked young, as they are only slightly pungent, whereas older leaves are bitter. Other species in Israel and Palestine include R. rostrum (Dagger radish), growing in the central mountainous districts and in Galilee, and R. aucheri (Dangling radish). |
| Rheum palaestinum | Desert rhubarb | (Arabic: kahamūn) A very rare plant found in the southern Negev and which is now an endangered species and protected under Israeli law. The Bedouins formerly made use of the root as a condiment for clarified butter. The flowers of the desert rhubarb are also edible. |
| Rosa canina | Dog rose | (Arabic: ward) The dog rose is a rare species in the wild, and is now only native to the northern regions of Israel and Palestine, and the Golan Heights, as well as to the historic mountainous regions of Samaria and Judea, growing in oak forests and among rocks. The shrub produces rosehips which is the principal part of the plant in food, and has been used, along with its flower petals, to make flavored hot drinks (teas), preserves, jellies and pickled relishes. From the thick, sweet peel a jam (confitures) is made. The ripe fruits are very sweet and can be eaten as they are. Before eating it is recommended to remove the seeds containing stiff hairs. For rose hip tea, simply put 1-2 teaspoons of dried rose hips in a tea pot, let it sit for 15–20 minutes, then strain into a cup. Similar species also native to the country are Rosa phoenicia (Phoenician rose) and R. pulverulenta (pine-scented rose) found on Mount Hermon. The shrub and its use as food in antiquity is mentioned in Mishnah (Sheviit 7:6–7). Today, R. canina and R. pulverulenta are protected under Israeli law. |
| Rosmarinus officinalis | Rosemary | (Arabic: ḥasa el-bān; iklīl ej-jebal;Hebrew: רוזמרין, roz-marin;) Shrub-like tree with highly fragranced leaves, once endemic to nearly all places in Israel and Palestine, but whose natural growth is now nearly extinct, except along the sea coasts. The leaves were traditionally used by Arab peasants in the country to season soups. |
| Rubus sanctus | Holy bramble | (Arabic: ʻaleq; ʻuleq; ṭūṭ) This bush produces the sweet and edible blackberry which can be eaten fresh, or collected in large quantities to be made into fruit compotes and confitures. The bush grows along watercourses all throughout the country, but especially in Lower Galilee and in the Golan Heights. Blackberry wine can be made by pressing out the juice from the berries, and adding thereto an equal amount of water. Mix and add brown sugar. Let stand for a few days. |
| Rumex pulcher | Fiddle dock | (Arabic: ḥummēḍ; ḥummēdah; lisān el-kalb) The sour leaves are eaten raw as a salad, or in a soup; roots boiled. Other species of Rumex, such as common sorrel (R. acetosa), are consumed fried in olive oil, or else used as a filling in the pastry sambusak. A similar edible herb native to the country, in the Negev and in the Judean desert, is Rumex cyprius (Pink sorrel), used by natives to prepare salads and a refreshing sour drink. The Bedouins of the Negev who give to this plant the name ḥamāṣīṣ would boil its leaves, strain it and mix the residue with sour goat's milk. |
| Salvia fruticosa | Three-lobed sage | (Arabic: mēramīye; miryamīye) Among the sages that are endemic to Israel and Palestine, the Three-lobed sage, known as mēramīye, is the most prized. Its scent is sweet and pleasant and makes for an excellent infusion in tea, but can also be used to flavor clarified butter. The plant is protected by Israeli law, owing to its great popularity by the local peasantry, and their practice of foraging for its aromatic leaves. |
| Satureja thymbra | Whorled savory | (Arabic: zaʻtar rūmī; zaʻtar farsī) In ancient times in the Land of Israel (modern Palestine), water in which the stems and leathery leaves of whorled savory had been steeped was used to flavor meats that had been skewered and placed over hot coals for roasting. (Note: Solomon Sirilio, Commentary on Jerusalem Talmud (Terumot 10:2 [52a]), s.v. מי צתרי. The discussion in the Jerusalem Talmud revolves around Terumah (heave-offering) which can only be eaten by Jewish priests in a state of ritual cleanness. In this case, whorled savory which was cultivated in one's garden and had been picked, its owner separated therefrom the designated tithes (heave-offering) meant for the priests, and when he had given the portion designated to the priests, the priest took water in which the same whorled savory had been steeped and sprinkled it over skewers of meat laid over hot coals in order to impart the plant's aroma and flavour to the meat. The question asked was whether a regular skewer of meat which lay alongside of it was permitted to be eaten by an outsider who was not of the priestly clan, although it too had absorbed the aroma of the other skewer belonging to the priest (P'nei Moshe Commentary and Sirilio's Commentary)) Today, whorled savory has protected status under Israeli law. |
| Scilla hanburyi | Desert squill | (Arabic: buṣṣēl; unsūl; bilbays) A geophyte that grows in the Judean desert, the Dead Sea valley, and the Negev, whose underground bulb is extracted, cleansed and roasted to be eaten. There are several species of Scilla that grow in the country, the most dominant of which in the central and northern parts of the country being the Autumn squill (Scilla autumnalis). The bulb of which is also used medicinally when prepared in wine vinegar. |
| Scolymus maculatus | Spotted golden-thistle | (Arabic: sinnāria; ṣinnāria; sunnāria; shōq el-fār; Hebrew: חוח עקוד; khukh akod;) An edible thorn prevalent throughout the country, whose tender leafstalk can be eaten raw or boiled until very tender, after the thorns have been carefully removed. The leaves have the taste of sweetened butter. The plant is believed to be mentioned in the Mishnah (Shevi'it 9:5), based on the cognate Arabic-Hebrew word sinariyot. A similar edible thorn native to the country is Scolymus hispanicus (Spanish golden-thistle), growing in higher mountainous elevations over 500 metres (1,600 ft) above sea-level. Eaten with yogurt, crushed garlic and lemon juice. |
| Scorpiurus muricatus | Prickly scorpiontail | (Arabic: slika) Leaves, stems and roots eaten as fresh salad, and they can also be cooked in soups; seeds are also edible. Leaves are traditionally chopped and fried in a skillet with a little water, a dash of olive oil, salt, spring onions (scallions), garlic, lemon juice, and white pepper. Eaten as a relish with bread. The plant blossoms in March–April. |
| Scorzonera judaica | Jordanian viper's grass | (Arabic: qaʻfūr; dhibāḥ saḥrāwī) The taproots of this herb are eaten raw when young, but when the plant grows older they require either cooking or roasting before they can be eaten. A palatable soup can be made from 20 roasted taproots, flavored with spring onions, olive oil and a dash of salt. The bulbous root is frequently harvested by Bedouins and eaten raw, as also the leaves and flowers. A similar species native to the country is Scorzonera papposa (Oriental viper's grass), also called in Arabic bashaʻ, khass berri and dhembāḥ, having the same edible taproot, eaten raw early in the season and cooked as the plant ages. The flowers, buds, leaves and stems of this species can also be eaten. |
| Silene vulgaris | White bladder campion | (Arabic: faqai; libbēneh) Tender leaves and shoots browned in olive-oil and eaten as a garnish. A similar species, Silene aegyptiaca (Egyptian campion), also prevalent in the country, are eaten in the same way. Leaves may also be steamed. The plant bears, albeit sparsely, a white flower that blossoms between April and June, and is unique among plants in that the plant has a very swollen flower calyx. |
| Silybum marianum | Holy thistle | (Arabic: khurfēsh ej-jemāl) The tender leafstalks of the rosette are edible, eaten either raw in a salad or cooked, after removing the thorns. It is also possible to eat the young inflorescence stems and flower heads before opening, whose taste is similar to that of artichokes. The plant blossoms in March–April. |
| Sinapis alba | White mustard | (Hebrew: khardal; Arabic: khardal) The leaves are stewed, while the dried seeds can be roasted to remove their pungency, then ground into a paste and made into a condiment with the yolks of boiled eggs, roasted wheat flour, treacle (date syrup), garlic and vinegar. (Note: In Jewish classical writings there are reminisces of its preparation. See, for example, Tosefta Yom-Tov 3:15 on how mustard seeds were put to the coals to remove their pungency; Tosefta Shabbat 14:14 on how treacle (date syrup) (Hebrew: devash) was added to the mustard paste; Mishnah Shabbat 20:2, on how that eggs were one of the ingredients used in its preparation; Ben-Ish Hai (Halakhot), Mishpatim – 2nd year, section 18, on how the usual practice was to add vinegar and crushed garlic to the mustard paste. Some add 2 tbsps. of olive oil to the paste, as well as ½ tsp. of salt, ½ tsp. of ground coriander seeds and 1 tsp. of turmeric for added flavor (Mayer-Chissick 2010, p. 76).) |
| Sisymbrium irio | London rocket | (Arabic: ḥwērre) Tender leaves eaten as a salad, especially when used to make a yogurt salad with olive oil. Stems and flowers are also edible. The plant is used by the Bedouins as a substitute for tobacco. The plant grows primarily in waste habitats and dunghills, especially near sheepfolds, where the soils are rich in nitrogen. A similar edible species is S. septulatum. |
| Sonchus oleraceus | Common sow-thistle | (Arabic: murēr; jawādid) The herb's young leaves and stems are chopped and fried in a skillet with a dash of olive oil, 3 tbsp. of water, chopped cloves of garlic, salt and pepper. Eaten as a garnish with bread. A salad can also be made from its leaves and stems. |
| Suillus granulatus | Weeping bolete; granulated bolete | (Arabic: fuṭr; falghānah) An edible pine mushroom that grows alongside pine woods after the first major rainfall in winter. The mushrooms are washed, sliced and either boiled or simmered in a skillet with a little water, salt and a dash of olive oil. |
| Taraxacum dens-leonis | Common dandelion | (Hebrew: shen ha'ari; Arabic: salaṭat; sarṭat er-ruḥbān) The dandelion is a leaf-vegetable whose leaves are consumed either raw as a salad, or cooked. In some societies, a type of coffee is brewed from the dandelion's baked rhizomes. There are some 60 species of dandelion that grow in the northern hemisphere. |
| Terfeziaceae | Truffle | (Hebrew: כְּמֵהָה; ki'me'hah; Arabic: kamā; tarfash) An edible fungus resembling a potato that attaches itself to the root of the sunrose (Helianthemum sessiliflorum) in the Western Negev. After thoroughly washing the sand off the truffle, it is either roasted or cooked as one would a potato, in either soup or beef stews. |
| Tordylium aegypticum | Egyptian hartwort | (Arabic: dunemeh) An edible herb that is cooked and used as a garnish in meals. Other species of hartwort (Tordylium) native to the country include Tordylium carmeli (very common in the Upper Galilee and in Mount Carmel) and T. trachycarpum, both of whose leaves can be eaten as a salad herb or as a condiment in other foods. |
| Trigonella berythea | Wild fenugreek | (Arabic: ḥelbe; ḥilba; nafal; Hebrew:hilbah, חִלבָּה;) A legume used in, both, human consumption and in animal consumption. It is eaten as a green plant when young and tender, almost immediately after sprouting, but also its seed is later prepared as a relish to be used in soups and for a sop. The cultivated variety (Trigonella foenum-graecum), which also grows wild in Upper Galilee, reaches a height of 20–25 cm and, like its other wild counterparts, produces thin sickle-shaped seed pods of 9–13 cm containing brown seed grains of 3–5 mm in length. In some places, they are used to make an herbal tea. Dried fenugreek seeds are finely ground into a flour, placed in a bowl where an abundance of water has been added and left to soak for 5 hours, at which time it greatly expands. The excess water is then poured out. The soaked fenugreek flour is then beaten, until one is left with a frothy consistency. While beating, a little water is gradually added again to the mixture, along with salt, crushed chili-peppers (Zhug) and chopped coriander leaves. Water is added to thin out the frothy relish and to reduce its bitterness. There are more than 25 species of Trigonella that are native to the country, with Arabian fenugreek (Trigonella arabica), called by the Bedouins nafal, being very common in the northern Negev where it grows in concentrated, round patches (conspicuous by its greenery), and its leaves [sic] (seeds) used to flavor clarified butter. |
| Urtica urens | Small nettle | (Arabic: qurrēṣ; gūrres) A plant that affords much protein when cooked and eaten. The stinging nettles are, at first, irritating when touched, but have no effect after boiling in hot water. Leaves and stems are cooked, but the stems are somewhat fibrous when eaten, although its pulp can easily be sucked out. The seeds of the nettle can also be collected and roasted to be eaten. In Israel and Palestine there are four species of nettle, with Urtica pilulifera also being harvested in the wild, its leaves first steeped in hot water for a few minutes and then put into a food processor to be blended into a mash, whence it is made into a soup. |
| Veronica syriaca (V. cymbalaria) | Speedwell | (Arabic: ḥwērre; ḥwērne; kibs) Used as a spice to flavor buttermilk and yogurt. |
| Vicia spp. | Vetches | (Arabic: kirsenne; bīqa; bāqia fawēleh; ṭaqūsh el-bissī; jaylabān) Many species of wild vetch are native to the country, and all have small, edible seedpods, made palatable after cooking. Some of the varieties common to the country are the Barn vetch (Vicia monantha) which is known to the Bedouins under the name jaylabān, the Palestine vetch (Vicia palaestina), called in Arabic kirsenne berri or ksēksa, the Common vetch (Vicia sativa), the Helmeted vetch (Vicia galeata), among a host of others (V. narbonensis, V. hybrida, V.villosa, V. sericocarpa, V. peregrina, V. tenuifolia). Tender sprouts of the plant can be eaten fresh. |
| Vigna luteola (Vigna nilotica) | Hairy cowpea; Nile bean | (Arabic: ʻulēq; mash) An edible bean that grows wild in the Hula plain, in the Plain of Sharon and in the environs around Beth Shean. |

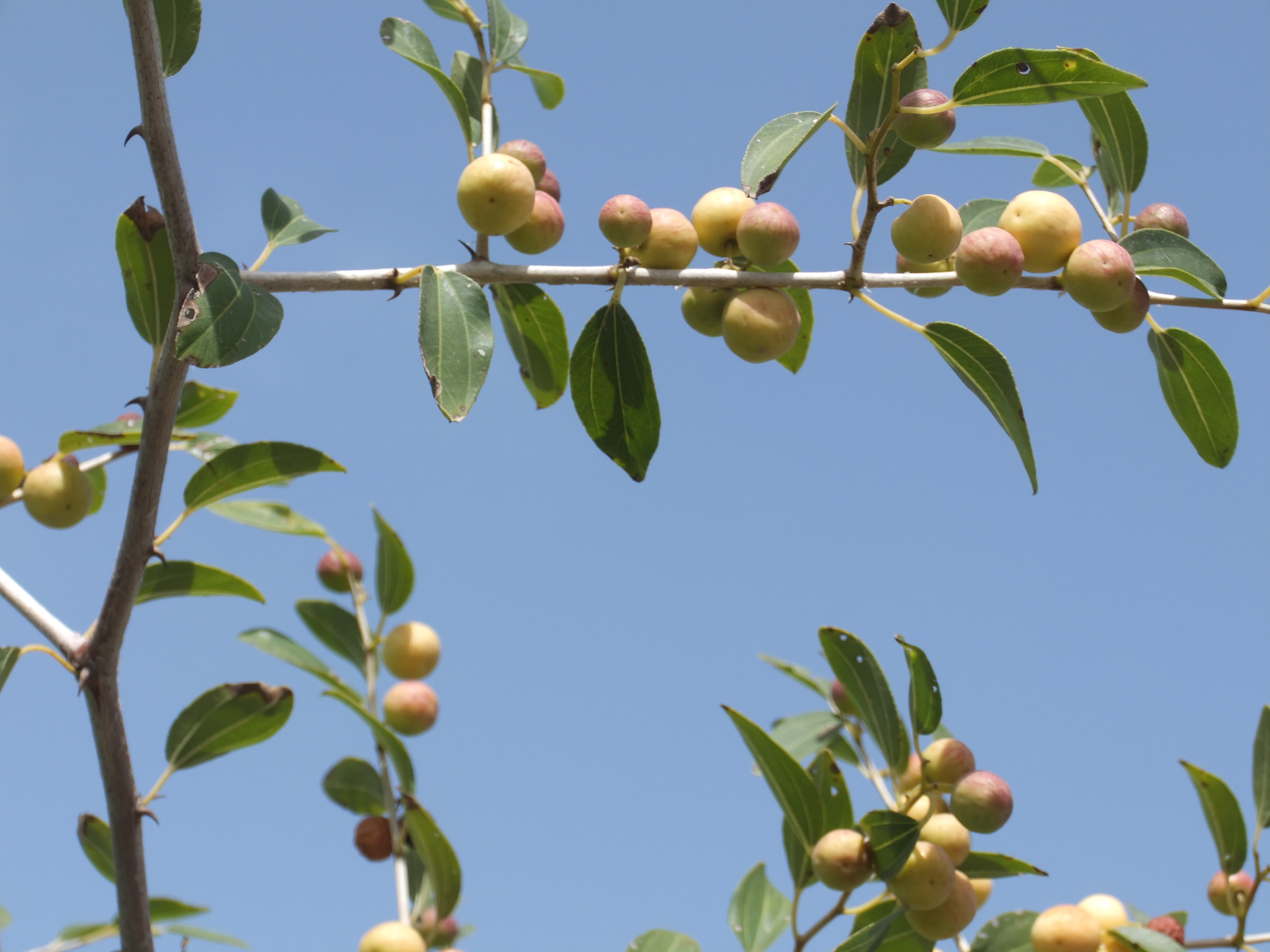
Ziziphus spina-christi fruit

=== Trees ===
Trees Many different fruit trees (e.g. grapes, figs, dates, olives, walnuts, plums, almonds, etc.) were cultivated in the country. Some of these trees and vines can still be found in abandoned villages and state-owned properties, which make them accessible to all.

Rarer varieties of fruit trees, such as wild medlars (Cotoneaster nummularius) and cherries, can be found in elevations of around 1,700 metres (5,600 ft) on Mount Hermon.

The most common edible fruit trees in their geographic regions include:

Trees
| Species | Common name | Observations |
|---|---|---|
| Amygdalus communis | Bitter almond | (Arabic: luz; lawz) This tree is common all throughout the country, and is often found on public lands, where the fruit can be readily collected. Many trees, however, contain bitter almonds, but which fruit can be made edible after preparation, in the same manner in which apricot pits are made edible. After cracking open, the almonds are boiled once and left in the pot of water for the remaining day. This process is repeated four days, with a change of water each day. This process lessens by degrees its bitterness. When the water in which they are soaked becomes white, that is a sign that the seed kernels are edible. They are then removed from the water, peeled and spread out in the sun to dry. While they are partially dry, salt water is sprinkled over them and are then roasted in a skillet, without oil. Today, the almond tree is protected under Israeli law. |
| Arbutus andrachne | Strawberry tree | (Arabic: qēqab; qaṭleb) This perennial green tree finds its habitat in the mountainous regions of the historic Judea and Samaria (West Bank), as well as in Upper and Lower Galilee. It can be found in elevations as high as 1,100 metres (3,600 ft) above sea level. The small reddish-orange and tan-colored fruit can be harvested when ripe, and when laid up in a dark and dry place to dry for 2–4 weeks, becomes elastic in its texture and sweet to the palate, like candy. The strawberry tree is easily recognized by its smooth reddish-brown bark. Today, the strawberry tree is protected under Israeli law. |
| Celtis australis | Mediterranean hackberry | (Arabic: mēs) A rare deciduous tree, now protected under Israeli law, whose sweet, succulent fruit is considered to be tasty and used in making jams. The fruit (a drupe) ripens between the Gregorian calendar months of August and October. The tree is often found near ruins and at the entranceway to Arab villagers' houses, as it was thought to ward off evil spirits and the evil eye. A confiture can be prepared from the fruit, by cooking the fruit in a pot of boiling water over a high heat, until the outer fleshy part (exocarp) separates from the stone, and the stones have sunken to the bottom of the pot. |
| Ceratonia siliqua | Carob tree | (Arabic: kharrūb) A perennial green tree that yields in late summer an edible pod-like fruit containing a sweet mucilaginous pulp. The pods when collected can be eaten raw, or a beverage made from them by boiling the pods in a pot of water, to which ground cinnamon, lemon juice and sugar has been added. Allowed to cool and served. The seeds taken from the pods can be ground and used as a substitute for cocoa and as food. Today, the tree is protected under Israeli law. |
| Cercis siliquastrum | Judas tree | (Arabic: khezriq; ʻarūs er-rabba; dāḍī; zemzarīq; shibruq; jezarūq) A tree that is considered an endangered species, for which it is now protected under Israeli law. Its pink-lilac colored flowers bloom in late March and early April, are edible, and have a sweet-acid taste. The florets have been used to flavor wine. |
| Colutea istria | Bladder senna | (Arabic: sēsabān; saysib) Not a real senna, this deciduous shrub is common to the highlands of the central Negev, growing in semi-desert gulches along rock faces, and is now protected under Israeli law. The shrub produces a fruit resembling a swollen pod, 5–6 cm long and is pointed at both ends. The fruit pods are scattered by the wind, and when they fall and roll upon the ground they break-open and their seeds scatter everywhere. These seeds are edible. |
| Cordia sinensis | Cordia | (Arabic: sujayil el-ʻaraf; dabbaq) The drupes of this rare tree are mostly eaten by birds, but are also fit for human consumption. Saadia Gaon thought that the uncultivated fruit of the ğūfnin (Hebrew: גופנן), mentioned in the Mishnah (Demai 1:1), was the Assyrian plum (Cordia myxa), formerly known in Arabic as el-sebastān, and which was prevalent in the marketplaces throughout Palestine in the 2nd-century of the Common Era. Today, Cordia sinensis is protected by law, and found only in the Ein Gedi Nature Reserve, along the Dead Sea valley. |
| Crataegus aronia | Spiny hawthorn | (Arabic: zaʻrūr; nebq) A deciduous tree now protected under Israeli law, and common throughout the historic hill country of Judea and Samaria, as well as in the Galilee. The Arab peasantry (fellahin) would often collect the small yellow, apple-like fruit from which they would prepare a sweet fruit conserve, or hot drink. |
| Ficus sycomorus | Sycamore fig | (Arabic: jumēz) The sycamore fig, although now extinct in many areas of the country, can still be seen in places in and around Ashkelon, along the coast. The tree is a prolific bearer of many small, edible reddish figs. The tree, however, is protected under Israeli law. In the Middle Ages, the sycamore fig which grew along the coast of Palestine is said to have produced two kinds of small figs: one, the size of a hazel nut having a soft peel, and which was very sweet and juicy, known as el-belamy. The other, which grew in the vicinity of Gaza and whose fruit was smaller than el-belamy, was worth double its cost, being sweeter than el-belamy, yet without its juiciness and easier on the digestive tract. |
| Nitraria retusa | Salt tree; Nitre bush | (Arabic: ḥabb el-ghurgud) A thorny, desert shrub, growing between 1 and 2 meters, and producing a sweet, edible red drupe, consumed mostly by birds, jackals and camels. The shrub is found throughout the Negev, in ravines alongside watercourses and in salt flats. Fruit of the related species Nitraria schoberi is also eaten. |
| Phillyrea latifolia | Broad-leaved phillyrea | (Arabic: berza) A perennial green tree that grows wild throughout the country and which bears a small, round blueish-black fruit (4–5 mm.) having a tart, grape-like taste. The fruit ripens in the Fall. The tree is protected under Israeli law. |
| Pinus pinea | Stone pine | (Arabic: snowbar) Once endemic to the country, almost all the native stands have been cut down to extinction, although now, largely due to reforestation, has been replanted in forests, gardens and in public places. The edible seed ripens in summer, once every 3 seasons, or in 2½ years after flowering. |
| Prunus ursina | Bear's plum | (Arabic: ḥoḥ al-dhēb) Fruit tree grows wild in the mountainous regions of Upper Galilee and in the forests surrounding Mount Hermon, above 700 metres (2,300 ft) in elevation. The tree flowers in late March and April, and bears fruit in late summer. The tree is protected under Israeli law. |
| Pyrus syriaca | Syrian pear | (Arabic: injās berri) The fruit of this tree ripens in September, and there is only a short window of opportunity of about one-week to eat the fruit, since it quickly falls off the tree and begins to rot. The tree is found primarily in the mountainous districts of the country and in Galilee. The tree is protected under Israeli law. |
| Quercus spp. | Oaks | (Arabic: balūṭ; sindiyān; mallūl) There are five species of oak trees growing in Israel and Palestine, all of which are protected under Israeli law. The acorns produced by these trees were very rarely used as food, although they, too, are edible after they have been leached to remove the tannins. The leaching process is thought to have been similar to the preparation of acorn mush as noted in other cultures, such as the wiiwish of the North American Indians. In Iran, they made use of a batch of pre-prepared, dried acorn mash that had already been leached of its bitterness. (Note: In Iran, the method of preparation was as follows: Acorns were collected, hulled and peeled. After drying, the acorns were crushed with a heavy stone. The acorn flour was taken-up and placed in a large bowl lined with a cloth strainer where it is mixed with boiling water, drained of excess water, and placed inside a tub where it is covered up and placed for three days in a warm place. This allows it to ferment. After three days, the tub is uncovered and placed under a running fountain of water for about six hours to remove all bitterness. The dough is then taken-up and kneaded and pressed into small balls that are placed on a large, flat board and left upon a rooftop, in the open-air and sun to dry. After drying, the acorn balls are stored, until ready for use.) Once the acorn mash was re-hydrated in water, it was spread over a convex griddle (Arabic: sâj) with a dash of salt and baked like bread over the fire. It was then taken off the griddle and broken-up between one's fingers to be eaten with yogurt. Dalman noted that in Trans-Jordan acorns were consumed after first being roasted. The book Alpha-Beta of Ben Sira mentions acorns (balūṭ) as food worthy of human consumption. |
| Rhus coriaria | Sicilian sumac | (Arabic: sūmmāq) A small deciduous tree whose reddish fruit has a sweet-and-sour taste, and, when finely chopped, is used as a seasoning in salads and in cooked dishes. The fleshy part of the sumac fruit can also be eaten fresh and has a lemony taste. A similar sumac tree growing mainly north of the Judean desert in the Samaritan frontier on rocky cliffs and bearing edible berries is R. tripartita (Syrian sumac). Both shrubs are protected under Israeli law. |
| Salvadora persica | Toothbrush tree | (Arabic: arāk; rāk; ḥumir) A perennial green tree resembling a large shrub, native to desert oases and the Dead Sea coastal region. Bears edible, but pungent, red berries. The tree is protected under Israeli law. |
| Ziziphus spina-christi | Christ's thorn jujube | (Arabic: nabk; sidr) The Christ's thorn jujube has a wide distribution all across the country, and is one of the few fruit trees that are known to yield fruit twice annually. They are most plentiful along the coastal plain and in the adjacent valley south of the Sea of Galilee. Today, the tree is protected under Israeli law. Its small, round fruit, resembling small, yellow apples, has long been a reserve food source in times of need. The fruit is mentioned in the Mishnah (compiled in 189 CE) under the late Hebrew name rīmīn. Preserves can be made from them. Al-Mukaddasi mentions that, in his day, people would prepare a porridge sweetened with the nabk fruit, after being spread out on reed mats to dry and stick together. |

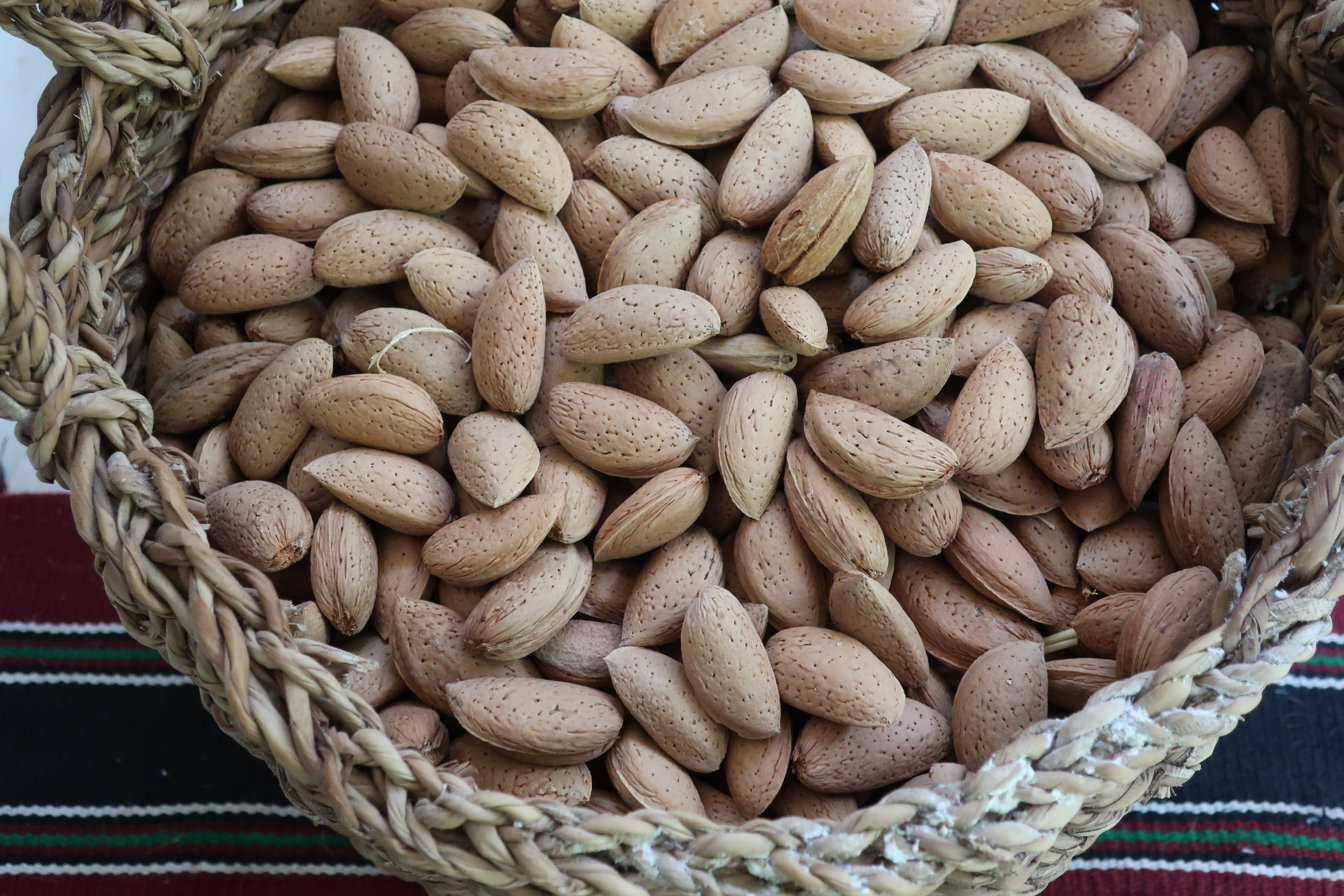
Almonds

== See also ==
- Famine food
- List of edible seeds
- List of forageable plants in the temperate zone
- List of plants in the Bible
- List of native plants of Flora Palaestina (A–B)
- List of native plants of Flora Palaestina (C–D)
- List of native plants of Flora Palaestina (E–O)
- List of native plants of Flora Palaestina (P–Z)
