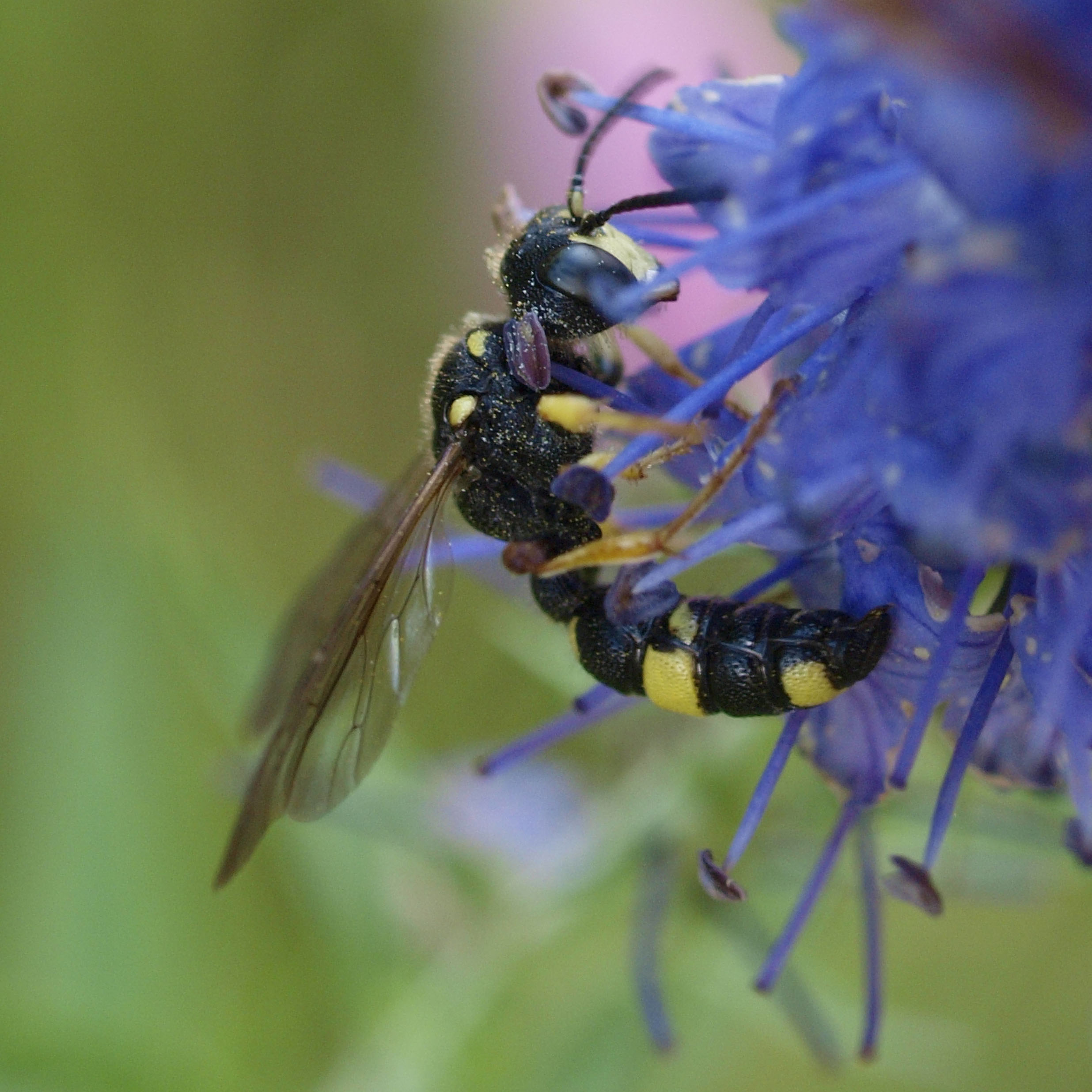
- female foraging

Scientific classification
- Kingdom: Animalia
- Phylum: Arthropoda
- Class: Insecta
- Order: Hymenoptera
- Family: Philanthidae
- Genus: Cerceris
- Species: C. rybyensis

Binomial name
- Cerceris rybyensis (Linnaeus, 1771)

Synonyms
- Cerceris albofasciata (S. Eck, 1979); Cerceris ariasi Giner Marí, 1941; Cerceris colon (Thunberg, 1815); Cerceris hortorum (Panzer, 1799); Cerceris kashmirensis Nurse, 1903; Cerceris ornata (Fabricius, 1790); Cerceris variabilis (Schrank, 1802); Crabro colon (Thunberg, 1815); Crabro variabilis Schrank, 1802; Philanthus biguttatus Thunberg, 1815; Philanthus colon Thunberg, 1815; Philanthus hortorum Panzer, 1799; Philanthus ornatus Fabricius, 1790; Philanthus rybyensis (Linnaeus, 1771); Philanthus semicinctus Panzer, 1797; Sphex apifalco Christ, 1791; Sphex rybyensis Linnaeus, 1771; Vespa infundibuliformis Fourcroy, 1771; Vespa ornata (Fabricius, 1790)

= Cerceris rybyensis =

Species of wasp

Cerceris rybyensis, the ornate tailed digger wasp, is a Palearctic species of solitary wasp from the family Philanthidae which specialised in hunting small to medium-sized mining bees. It is the type species of the genus Cerceris and was named as Sphex rybyensis by Carl Linnaeus in 1771.

== Description ==
Cerceris rybyensis females measure 8-12mm in length, males measure 6-10mm. It has distinctive yellow and black bands on its abdomen, including a segment wide yellow band in the middle, and yellow tibia on the rear legs.

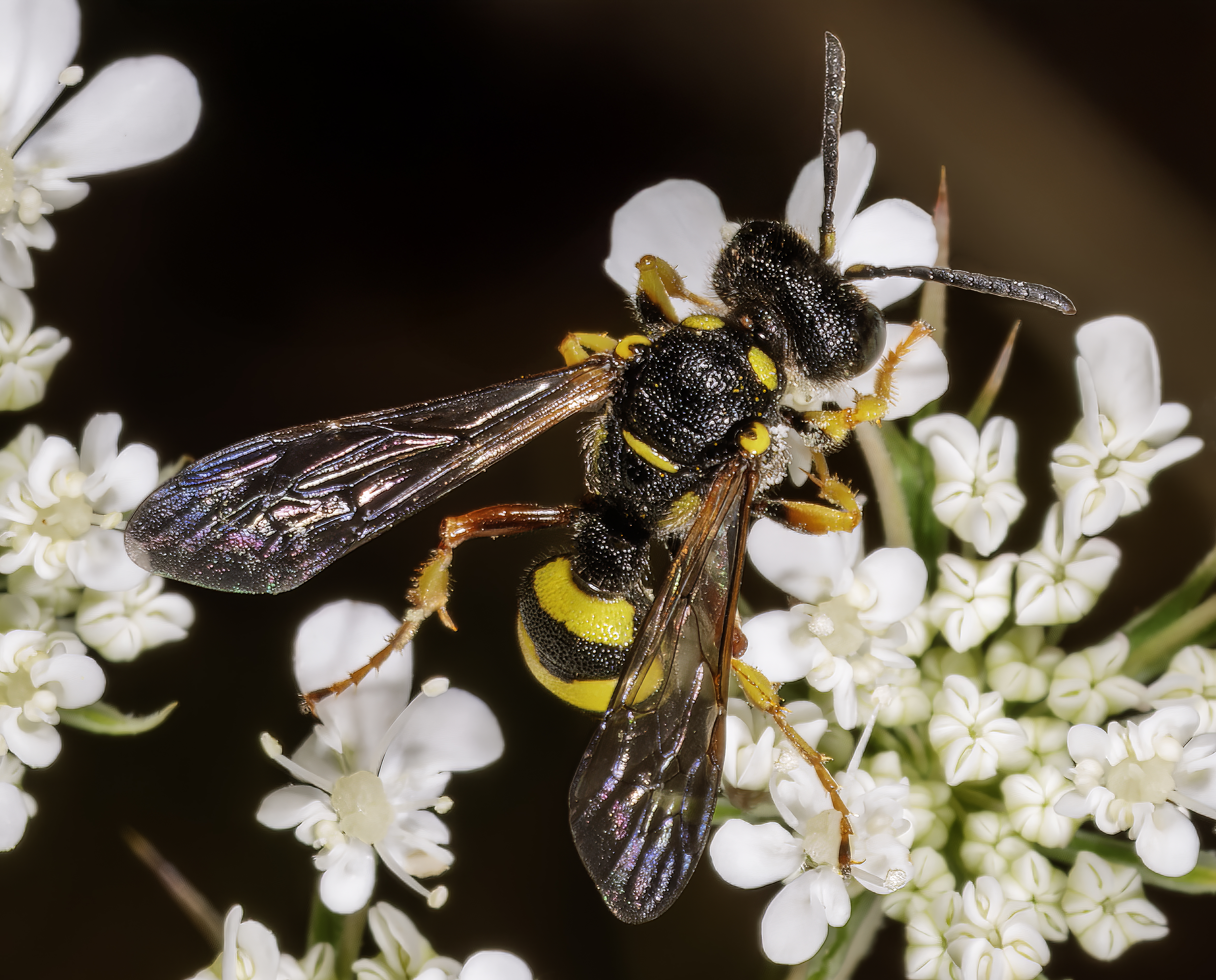
Cerceris rybyensis dorsal view on Tordylium maximum

== Distribution ==
Cerceris rybyensis is a Palearctic species which is found from southern England and the Iberian Peninsula in the west through most of Europe, including Scandinavia east to Japan.

== Habitat ==
Cerceris rybyensis occurs in areas of sandy soils, both coastal and inland, but it can also be found in areas with heavier soils and in chalk grassland. It has even been recorded from a suburban garden in London. It often nests in association with other burrowing wasps and bees including the sand tailed digger wasp (Cerceris arenaria).

== Biology ==
Cerceris rybyensis is univoltine (one brood per year) and the adults have a flight period of June to September. The females hunt small and medium-sized bees of different genera, the prey being stung to paralyse it. The female also squeezes the prey's neck with her mandibles; the prey normally survives for around two days after capture. Normally bees are hunted as they return to the nest loaded with pollen as this is the most efficient way to hunt as the bees return to a fixed point and the pollen load makes them less able to avoid the wasp. However, there are records of prey which are either females without any pollen or males. Depending on the size of the prey each cell is provisioned with between five and eight prey items.

Females C. rybyensis often nest in quite dense aggregations, usually located on exposed compacted soil in level ground. Nests have been recorded on an unsurfaced road, in abandoned sand quarries and even in soil between the paving stones of a patio in a suburban garden. The nest burrow is up to 15 cm long and short lateral burrows are dug out of the tunnel sides and these terminate in single cells. The main burrow starts as a vertical shaft but the lower part is almost horizontal with the soil surface. The larvae spin robust cocoons at the end of the flight period to overwinter in. Each nest may be provisioned with a single species of bee, and between 30 and 30 may be found in a nest. On leaving her burrow to hunt the female flies around it to orientate herself but on return she flies straight into the burrow.

Mating in C. rybyensis starts on the ground but normally the pair move into cover to finish copulation.
