= Tordylium elegans =

Scientific classification
- Kingdom: Plantae
- Clade: Embryophytes
- Clade: Tracheophytes
- Clade: Spermatophytes
- Clade: Angiosperms
- Clade: Eudicots
- Clade: Asterids
- Order: Apiales
- Family: Apiaceae
- Genus: Tordylium
- Species: T. elegans

Binomial name
- Tordylium elegans (Boiss. & Balansa) Alava & Hub.-Mor.

Synonyms
- Ainsworthia elegans Boiss. & Balansa; Hasselquistia elegans (Boiss. & Balansa) Manden

Species of flowering plant

Tordylium elegans is a species of flowering plants in the family Apiaceae. It is endemic to Turkey.
