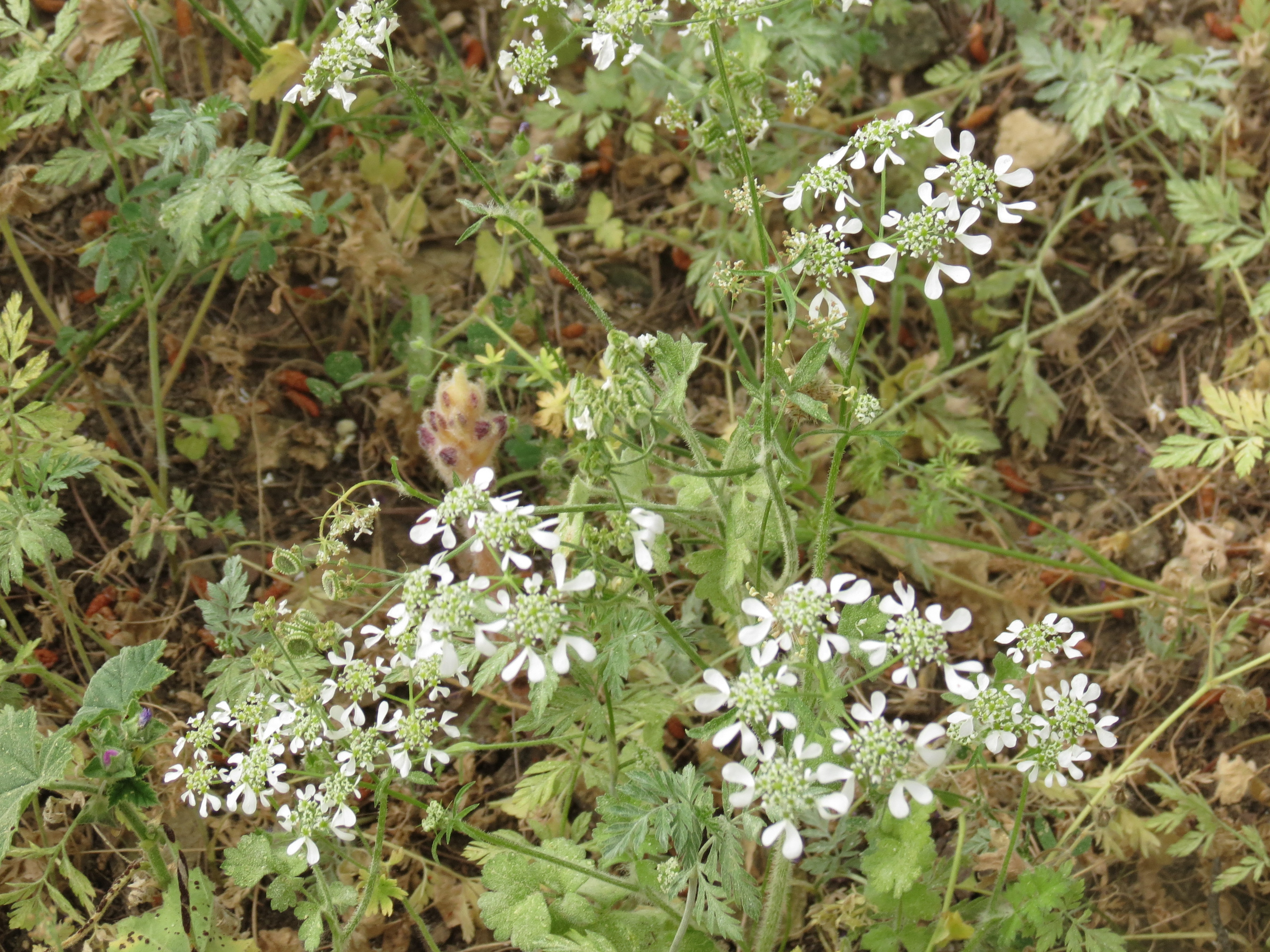
- Tordylium apulum

Scientific classification
- Kingdom: Plantae
- Clade: Tracheophytes
- Clade: Angiosperms
- Clade: Eudicots
- Clade: Asterids
- Order: Apiales
- Family: Apiaceae
- Subfamily: Apioideae
- Tribe: Tordylieae
- Subtribe: Tordyliinae
- Genus: Tordylium; L. or Tourn. ex L.

Species
- See text.

Synonyms
- Ainsworthia Boiss.; Condylocarpus Hoffm.; Hasselquistia L.; Synelcosciadium Boiss.

= Tordylium =

Genus of flowering plants

Tordylium is a genus of flowering plants in the carrot family (Apiaceae). Members of the genus are known as hartworts.

== Description ==
Tordylium species are annuals or biennials, covered in long hairs. Their stems may be hollow or almost solid. The basal leaves are more-or-less undivided, and have usually disappeared when the plant flowers. The stem leaves are once pinnate. The flowers have persistent sepals and white petals, with those on one side much longer than the other. The fruits are about as long as they are wide. Their side ridges have whitish wings.

== Taxonomy ==
Species assigned to the genus were first described by Carl Linnaeus in 1753 in Species Plantarum.

=== Species ===
Ainsworthia and Synelcosciadium were included in Tordylium by El-Aisawi & Jury in 1998. As of December 2022, Plants of the World Online accepted 20 species:

- Tordylium aegaeum Runemark
- Tordylium aegyptiacum (L.) Poir.
- Tordylium apulum L. – Mediterranean hartwort
- Tordylium brachytaenium Boiss. & Heldr.
- Tordylium cappadocicum Boiss.
- Tordylium carmeli (Labill.) Al-Eisawi
- Tordylium cordatum (Jacq.) Poir.
- Tordylium ebracteatum Al-Eisawi & Jury
- Tordylium elegans (Boiss. & Balansa) Alava & Hub.-Mor.
- Tordylium hasselquistiae DC.
- Tordylium hirtocarpum Candargy
- Tordylium ketenoglui H.Duman & A.Duran
- Tordylium lanatum (Boiss.) Boiss.
- Tordylium macropetalum Boiss.
- Tordylium maximum L. – hartwort
- Tordylium officinale L.
- Tordylium pestalozzae Boiss.
- Tordylium pustulosum Boiss.
- Tordylium syriacum L.
- Tordylium trachycarpum (Boiss.) Al-Eisawi

=== Etymology ===
The genus name derives from the Greek τορδύλιον/tordúlion, a variant form of τόρδυλον/tórdulon "hartwort, Tordylium officinale".

== Uses ==
Tordylium apulum, the Mediterranean hartwort or Roman pimpernel, is used as a vegetable in Greece and as a flavouring in Italy.

Tordylium officinale, the Officinal or Cretan hartwort (also a Mediterranean species), bears fruit formerly used as an emmenagogue, and the plant (plant part unspecified) has formed one of the ingredients of Theriac, a preparation believed to be an antidote to snake and other venoms. Courchet further states of the genus Tordylium in general that the various species bear fruits that—like those of many other Umbellifers—are aromatic and carminative, but that those of Tordylium are seldom used.
