= Edible plants =

Disambiguation page about edible plants

Edible plants include:

- List of culinary fruits
- List of culinary herbs and spices
- List of culinary nuts
- List of edible cacti
- List of edible flowers
- List of edible seeds
- List of forageable plants – Edible wild plants
- List of leaf vegetables
- List of root vegetables
- List of vegetables

== See also ==
- Crop
- Edible mushroom
- Edible seaweed
- List of domesticated plants
- List of plants used in herbalism
- Medicinal plants
- Plantas alimentícias não convencionais
