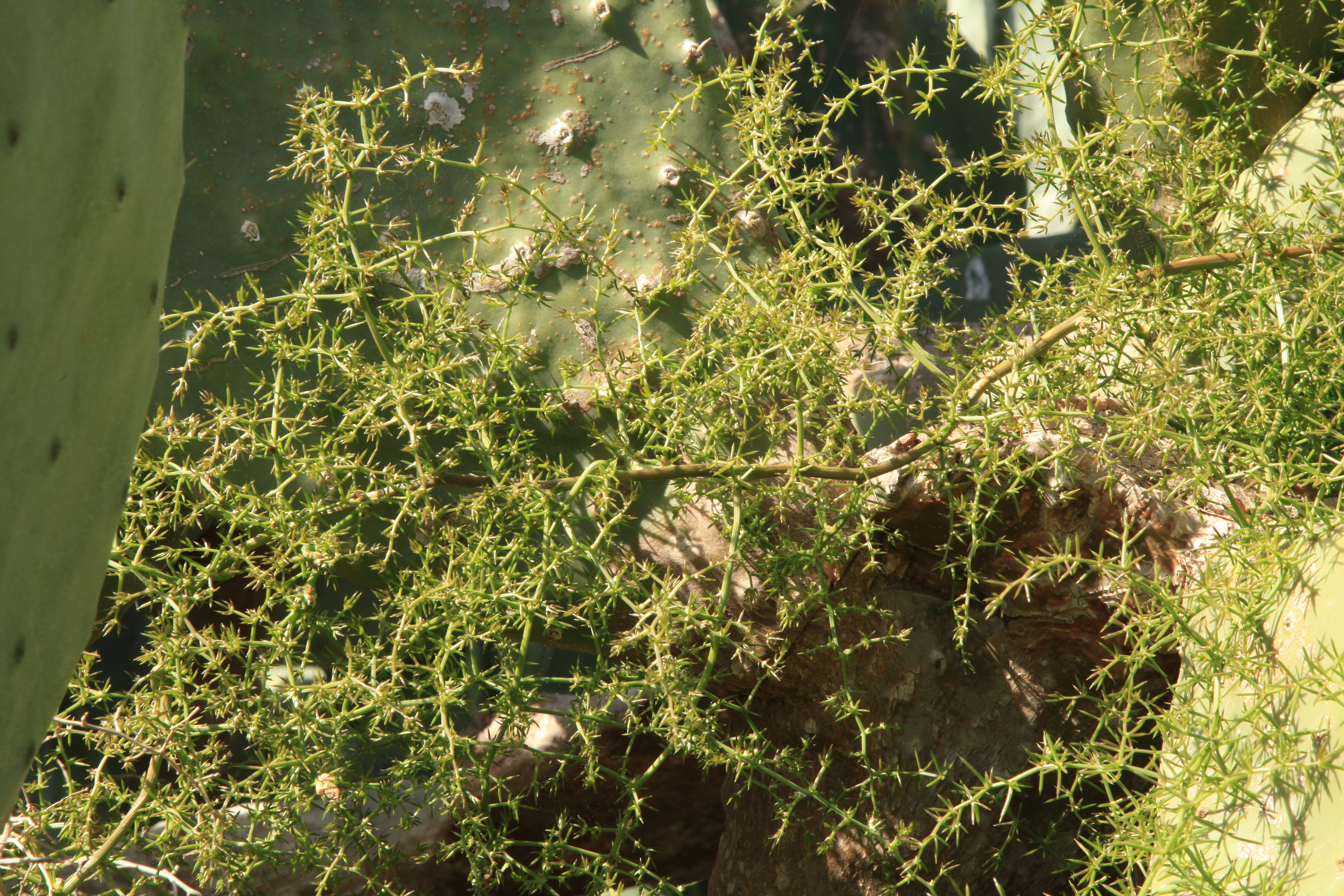

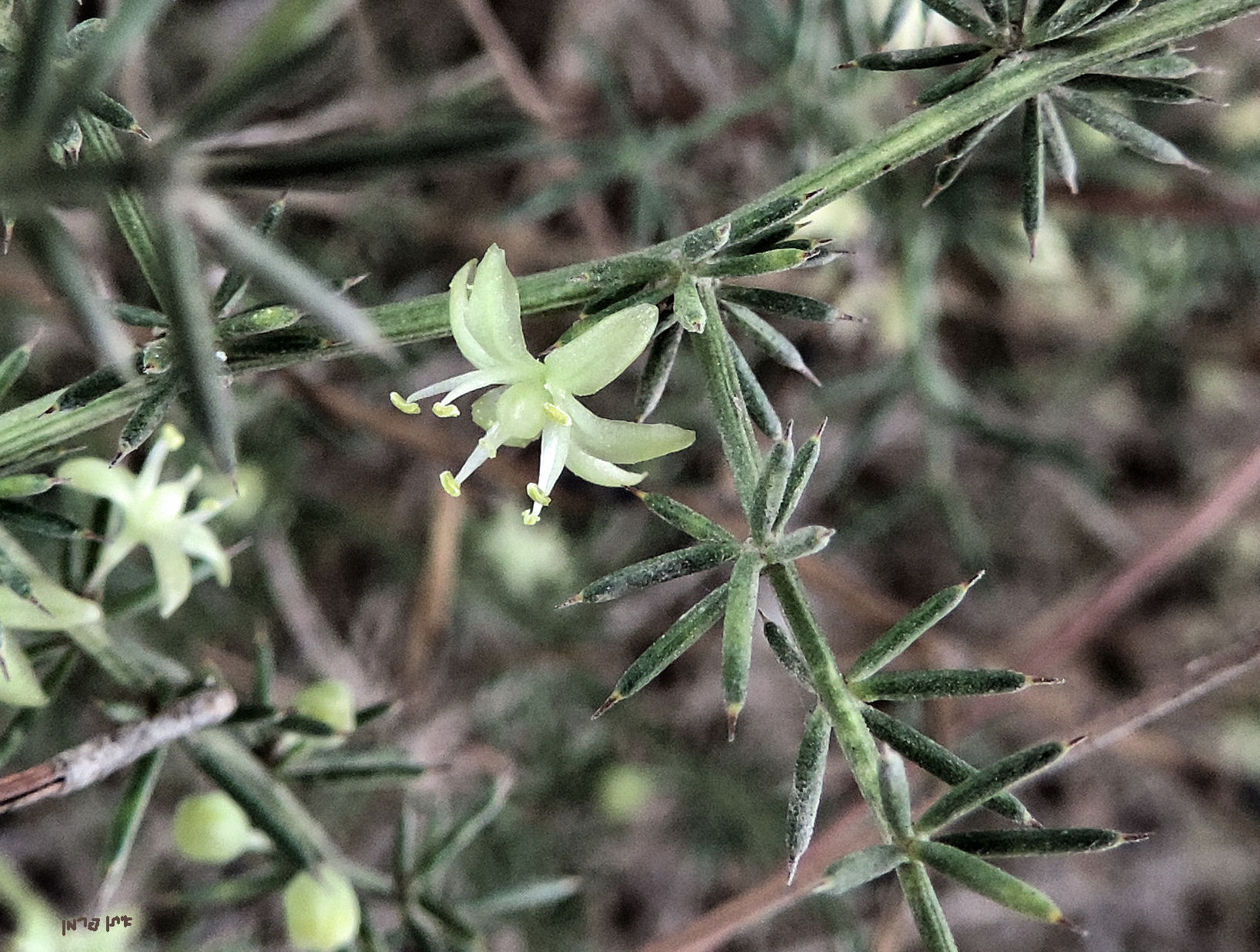
- Flowers

Conservation status
- Least Concern (IUCN 3.1)

Scientific classification
- Kingdom: Plantae
- Clade: Tracheophytes
- Clade: Angiosperms
- Clade: Monocots
- Order: Asparagales
- Family: Asparagaceae
- Subfamily: Asparagoideae
- Genus: Asparagus
- Species: A. aphyllus

Binomial name
- Asparagus aphyllus L.

= Asparagus aphyllus =

Species of plant

Asparagus aphyllus is a species of plants in the family Asparagaceae. They are climbing plants. Flowers are visited by the Western honey bee, Syritta pipiens, Phthiria, and Halictus.

== See also ==
- Wild edible plants of Israel and Palestine
