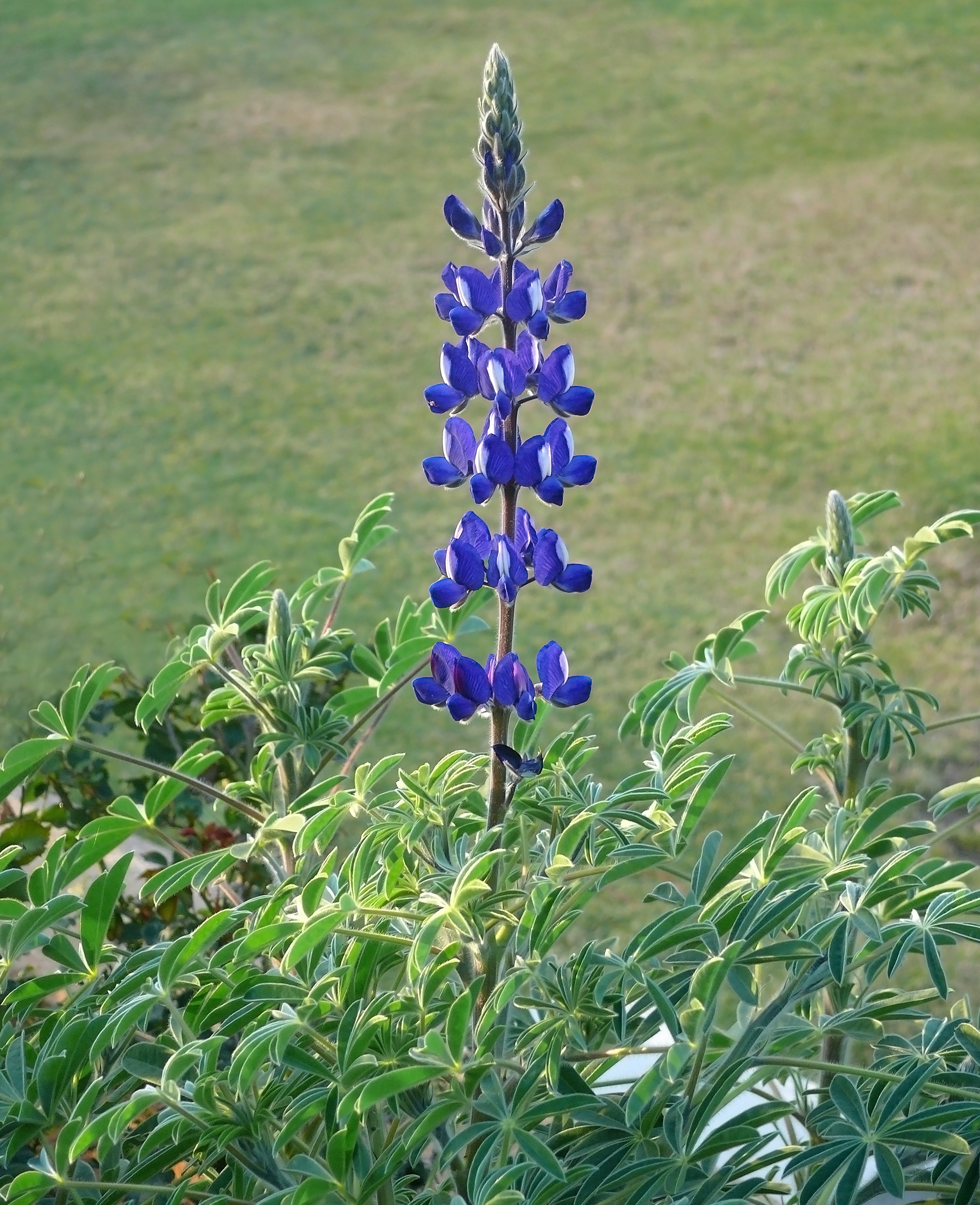

Conservation status
- Data Deficient (IUCN 3.1)

Scientific classification
- Kingdom: Plantae
- Clade: Tracheophytes
- Clade: Angiosperms
- Clade: Eudicots
- Clade: Rosids
- Order: Fabales
- Family: Fabaceae
- Subfamily: Faboideae
- Genus: Lupinus
- Species: L. pilosus

Binomial name
- Lupinus pilosus L.

Synonyms
- Lupinus varius L.

= Lupinus pilosus =

Species of legume

Lupinus pilosus, commonly known as blue lupine, (Hebrew: תורמוס ההרים, Arabic: ترمس برّي) is a species of flowering plant that is edible from the family Fabaceae that grows in Mediterranean scrubland.

== Description ==
The stem is 30–70 centimetres (12–28 in) long. Blooming from February to May, the species has white-coloured flowers which are 1–1.5 cm (3/8–5/8 in) long and pods 3–8 cm (1–3 in) in diameter. The legume is 3–8 cm long. In Israeli farms, the Lupinus pilosus has blue flowers with a white vertical spot in the middle.

== Culinary uses ==
Around the South Tyrolean village of Altrei (Anterivo), L. pilosus was historically grown. The seeds were roasted and mixed with malt grains and infused in boiling water to produce a coffee-like but caffeine-free hot beverage, Altreier kaffee ("Altrei coffee"). Since 2006, a local initiative has been reestablishing L. pilosus cultivation in the Altrei region to revive this culinary specialty.

In the geographical region of Palestine, the plant is numbered among the few wild edible plants, but the seeds still require leaching in boiling water several times (with replacement of the water) for the seeds to become palatable. The seeds are then roasted in a skillet with a dash of water, salted, and eaten. The prepared seeds may be pulverized and mixed with wheat or sorghum flour for bread.

== Gallery ==
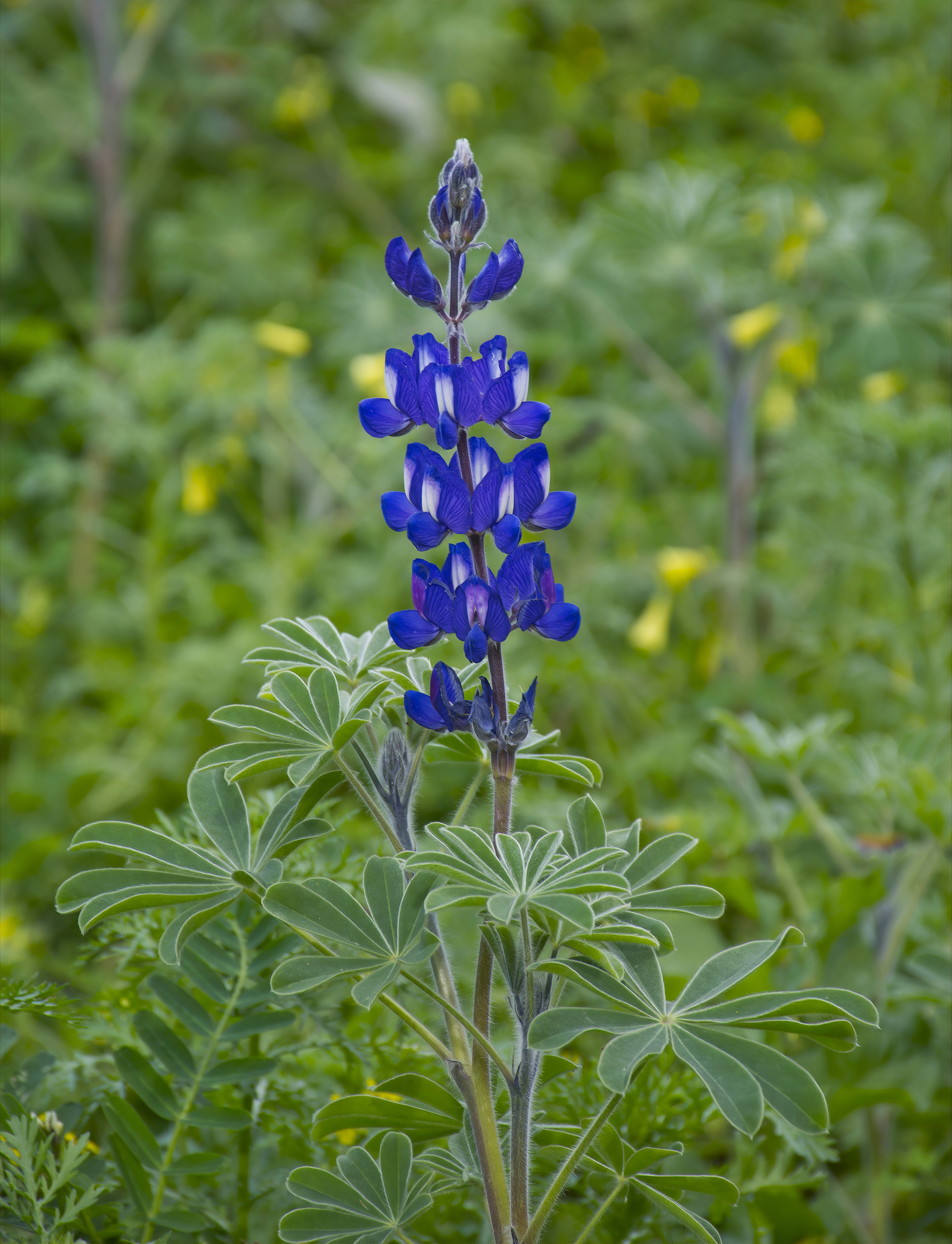
Kefar Shemaryahu, Israel

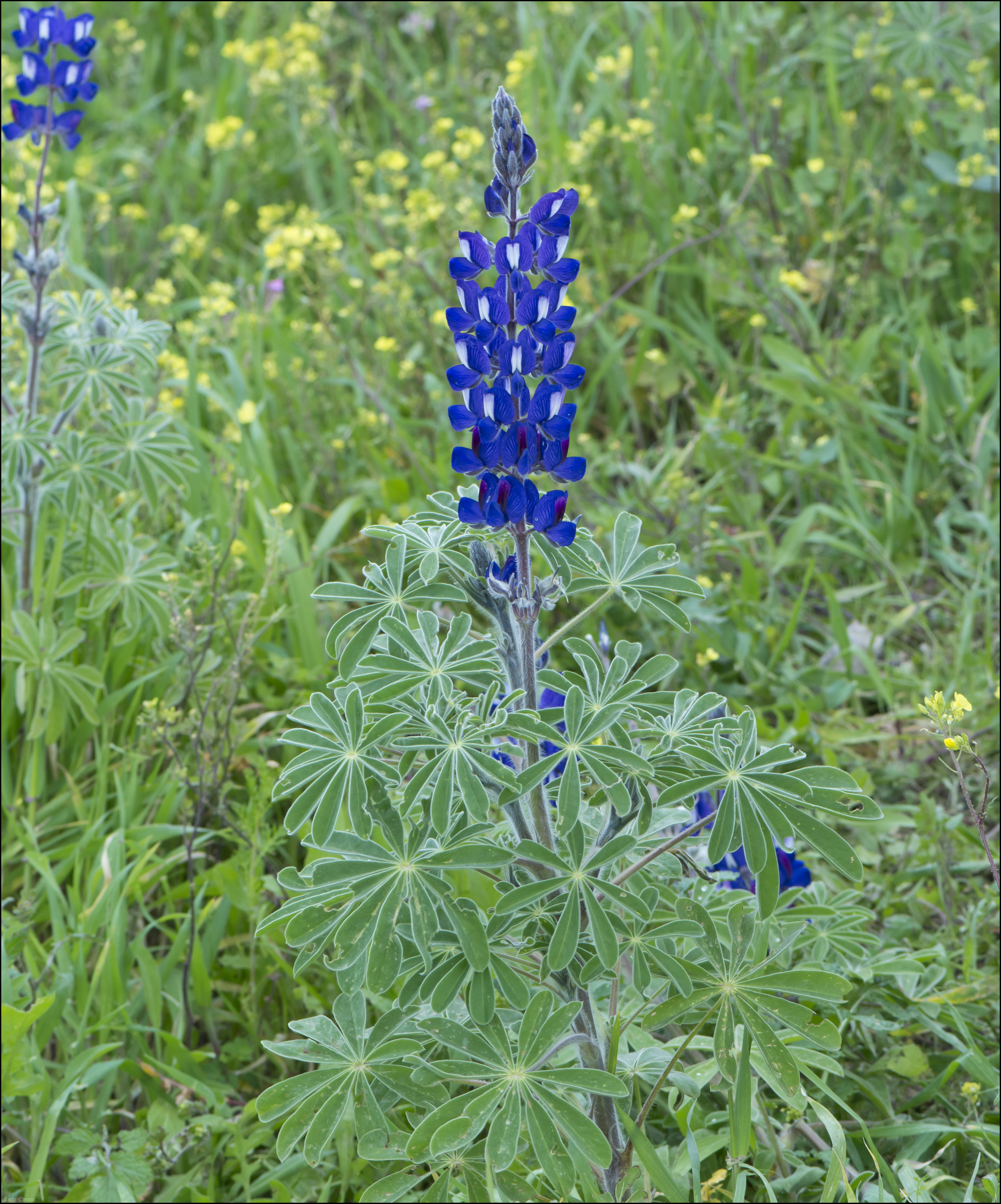
Tel Socho of the Elah Valley

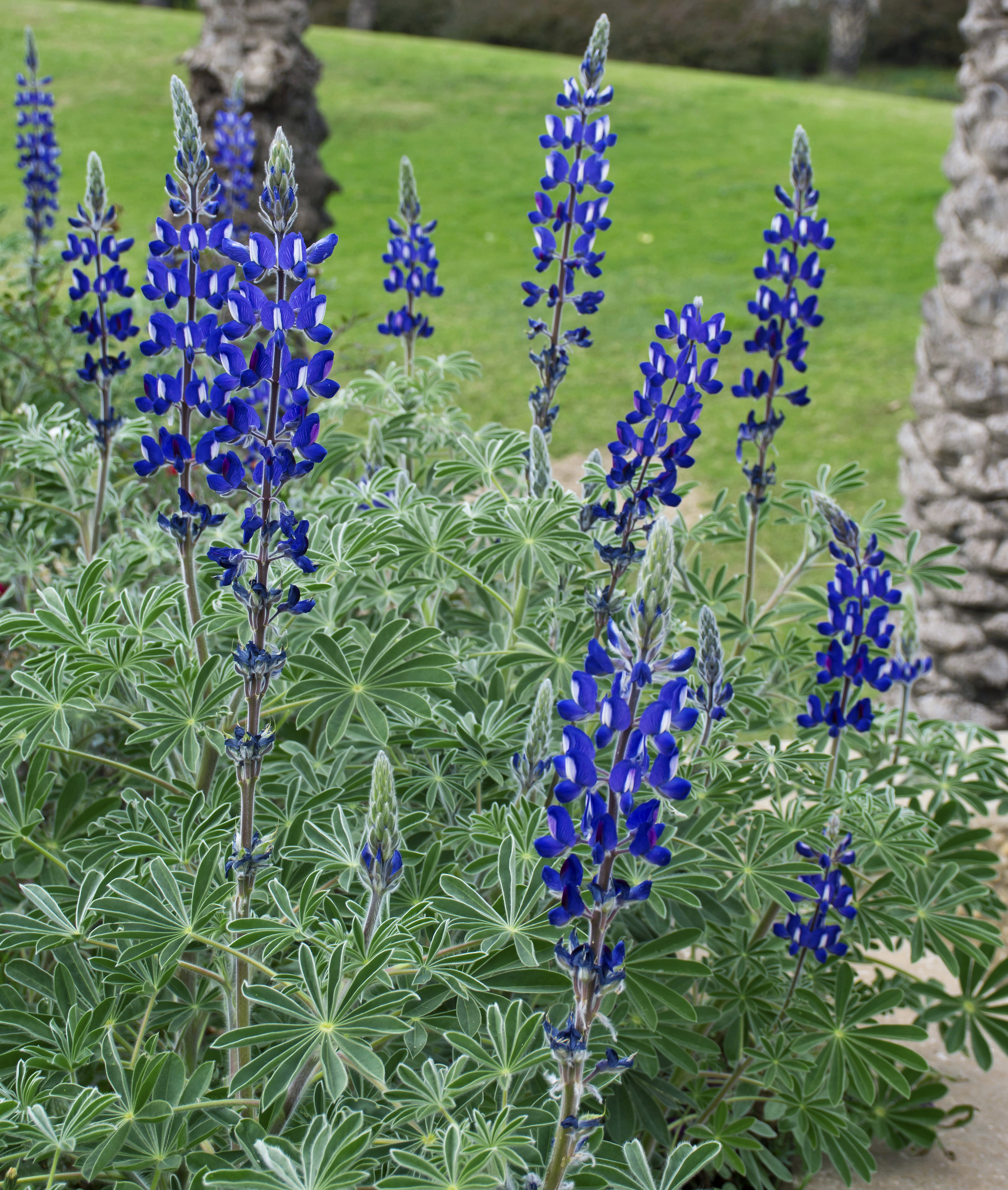
Israel

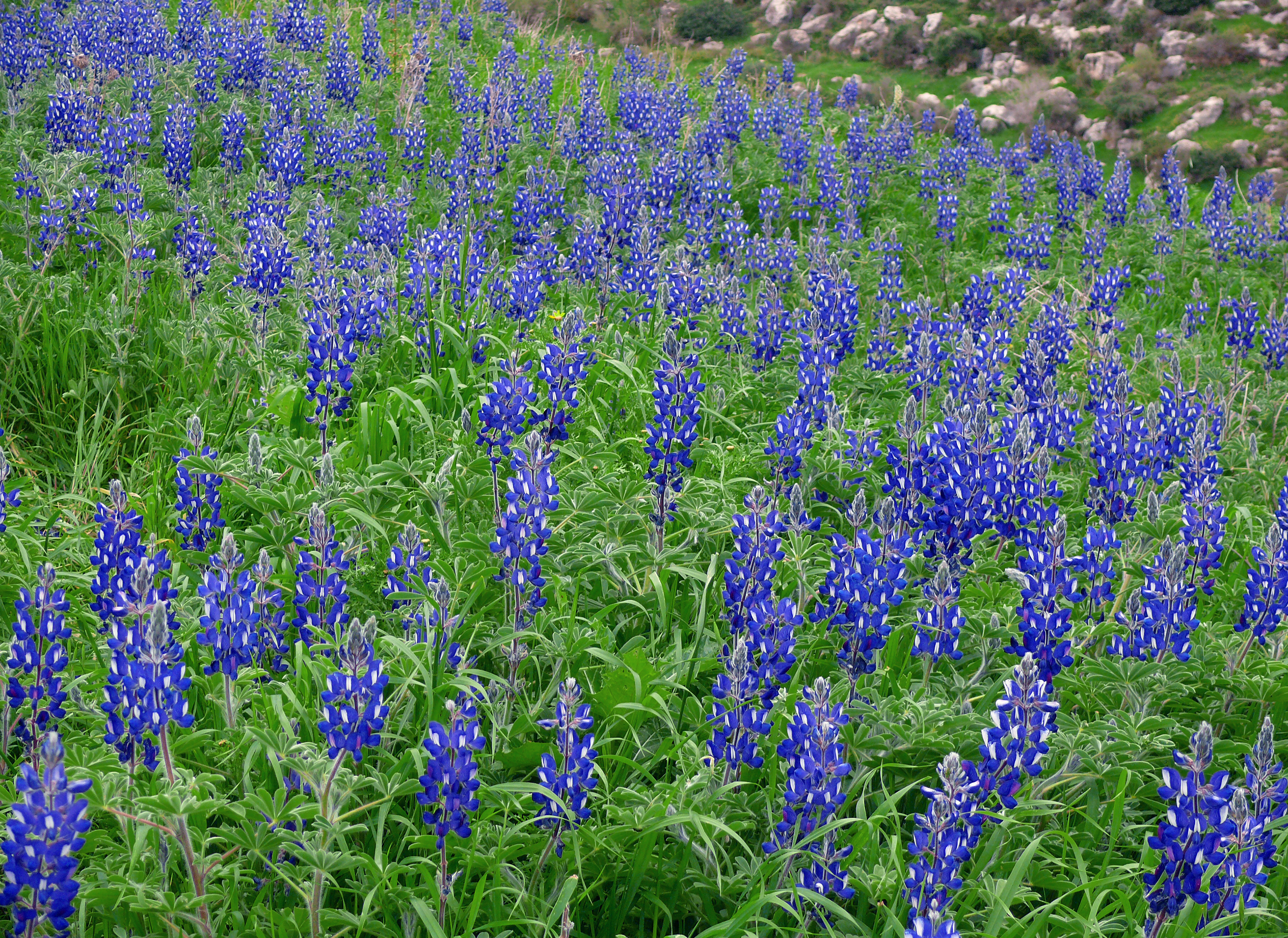
Field in Israel
