= Tordylium trachycarpum =

Scientific classification
- Kingdom: Plantae
- Clade: Tracheophytes
- Clade: Angiosperms
- Clade: Eudicots
- Clade: Asterids
- Order: Apiales
- Family: Apiaceae
- Subtribe: Tordyliinae
- Genus: Tordylium
- Species: T. trachycarpum

Binomial name
- Tordylium trachycarpum (Boiss.) Al-Eisawi

Synonyms
- Ainsworthia trachycarpa Boiss.; Ainsworthia byzantina Azn.; Pastinaca byzanthina (Azn.) Calest.; Tordylium byzantinum (Azn.) Hayek

Species of plant

Tordylium trachycarpum is a species of flowering plant in the family Apiaceae, native to Western Asia and European Turkey. It was first described by Pierre Edmond Boissier in 1849 as Ainsworthia trachycarpa.
