= List of forageable plants in the temperate zone =

Edible wild plants

This article lists plants commonly found in the wild, which are edible to humans and thus forageable. Some are only edible in part, while the entirety of others are edible. Some plants (or select parts) require cooking to make them safe for consumption.

Field guides instruct foragers to carefully identify species before assuming that any wild plant is edible. Accurate determination ensures edibility and protections against potentially fatal poisoning. Some plants that are generally edible can cause allergic reactions in some individuals. U.S. Army guidelines advise to test for contact dermatitis, then chew and hold a pinch in the mouth for 15 minutes before swallowing. If any negative effect results, it is advised to induce vomiting and drink a high quantity of water. Additionally, old or improperly stored specimens can cause food poisoning.

Other lists of edible seeds, mushrooms, flowers, nuts, vegetable oils and leaves may partially overlap with this one. Separately, a list of poisonous plants catalogs toxic species.

== List ==
These lists are ordered by the binomial (Latin) name of the species.

=== Trees and shrubs ===
Plant image	Part image	Common name	Binomial name	Distribution	Edible parts and uses	Ref.
		Juneberry	Amelanchier lamarckii	Naturalized in Western Europe	Berries (in June), edible raw	
		Barberry	Berberis vulgaris	Europe, North America, northwest Africa, western Asia	Berries (from July), edible raw, dried as a spice or cooked as a jelly	
		Sweet chestnut	Castanea sativa	Throughout Europe and parts of Asia; common in woods and parks	Nuts (October to November). Chestnuts are edible raw or in any other preparation, such as roasted, boiled, stewed or baked.	
		Hazel	Corylus avellana	In many European woodlands, at the edges of woods or in mature hedges	Hazelnuts (from late August to October), edible raw or processed	
		Hawthorn, may-tree	Crataegus monogyna	Native to Europe, northwest Africa and western Asia; naturalized elsewhere	Leaves (when young, in April), edible raw as a salad vegetable Berries (in autumn), edible raw, or made into jellies, jams and syrups, or used as a flavoring	
		Beech	Fagus sylvatica	Europe, except parts of Spain, northern England, northern parts of Northern Europe	Nuts (in September or October), edible raw or roasted and salted, or can be pressed for oil	
		Sea purslane	Halimione portulacoides	Seashores and salt marshes of western and southern Europe, and from the Mediterranean to western Asia	Leaves, raw as a salad, or stir-fried	
		Hop	Humulus lupulus	Native to the temperate Northern Hemisphere: Europe, North America, Asia	Young shoots and leaves (until May), edible cooked as a vegetable	
		Walnut	Juglans regia	Native to Central Asia, but naturalized in temperate zones worldwide	Nuts (ripening in September)	
		Juniper	Juniperus communis	Throughout the Northern Hemisphere in North America, Europe and Asia	Berries, both immature (green) and mature (dark); inedibly bitter when raw, but used as a spice, for beverages, as a jam or roasted and ground as a coffee substitute	
		Oregon-grape	Mahonia aquifolium	North America, occasionally naturalized in Europe	Berries, edible raw (though acidic) or made into a jelly	
		Crabapples	Malus sylvestris and other Malus species	Malus is native to the temperate zone of the Northern Hemisphere, in Europe, Asia and North America.	Fruit (from July), edible raw or, if too bitter, cooked as a jelly (containing much pectin)	
		Medlar	Mespilus germanica	Southeast Europe to West Asia, occasionally naturalized in Britain	Fruit (in November), edible after being bletted for a few weeks	
		Bog-myrtle, sweet willow, Dutch myrtle, sweetgale	Myrica gale	Parts of the northern hemisphere, including Japan, North Korea, Russia, Europe and North America	Leaves, dried as tea, or raw as roast chicken stuffing Nutlets and dried leaves, as a seasoning, including for beer (gruit)	
		Scots pine	Pinus sylvestris	Native to Europe and Asia	Needles (when young, April to August), can be boiled for tea or soaked in olive oil to yield an aromatic oil Nuts, tiny and difficult to extract from the cones, but edible raw	
		Mesquite	Prosopis juliflora	Native to Southern America, widely found in arid and hot climates worldwide as an invasive weed	Seed pods, edible raw or boiled, dried and milled to make flour, or fermented to make a mildly alcoholic beverage	
		Wild cherry	Prunus avium	Native to Europe, western Turkey, northwestern Africa, and western Asia; Found in hedgerows and woods, especially beech	Cherries, edible raw	
		Bullace, damson, other wild plums	Prunus domestica subsp. insititia	Prunus species are spread throughout the northern temperate regions of the globe.	Fruit (ripe from early October), edible raw	
		Sloe, blackthorn	Prunus spinosa	Native to Europe, western Asia, and locally in northwest Africa; also locally naturalised in New Zealand and eastern North America	Berries, edible raw, but very acidic unless picked after the first few days of autumn frost	
		English / French oak	Quercus robur	Native to most of Europe, and from Anatolia to the Caucasus, and also to parts of North Africa	Acorns (ripening in September to October), too bitter when raw, but used chopped and roasted as a substitute for almonds, or then ground as a substitute for coffee. After leaching out the bitter tannins in water, acorn meal can be used as grain flour.	
		Golden currant	Ribes aureum	Native to northwest North America	Berries, edible raw but tart	
		Wax currant	Ribes cereum	Native to western North America	Berries, edible raw but possibly semi-toxic	
		Blackcurrant	Ribes nigrum	Native to north-central Eurasia	Berries, used in jams	
		Redcurrant	Ribes rubrum	Native to western Europe	Berries, used in jams and kissel	
		Flowering currant	Ribes sanguineum	Western United States and Canada	Berries, edible raw and used in jams	
		Raspberries, blackberries, etc.	Rubus species	Widely distributed	Berries, edible raw and used in jams	
		Elder	Sambucus nigra	Europe, North Africa, Central Asia and Anatolia	Flowers (June to July), edible raw, as a salad green, or pickled, or to make tea, or alcoholic beverages Berries (August to October), edible when ripe (turning upside down) and cooked; raw berries are mildly poisonous	
		Whitebeam	Sorbus aria	Central and southern Europe	Berries, edible raw once overripe (bletted)	
		Rowan, Mountain-ash	Sorbus aucuparia	Native to most of Europe except for the far south, and northern Asia	Berries (August to November), bitter, but can be cooked to form a jelly, or used as a flavouring	
		Wild service-tree	Sorbus torminalis	Native to Europe, south to northwest Africa, and southeast to southwest Asia	Berries (from September), edible raw, but hard and bitter unless bletted	
		Lime	Tilia × europaea	Occasionally in the wild in Europe, or commonly grown in parks, on roadsides or in ornamental woods	Flowers (in full bloom, June or early July). A tea (popular in France as tilleul) can be made from the dried flowers. Leaves, without the stalks, edible raw as a salad vegetable	
		Wild lowbush blueberry	Vaccinium angustifolium	Eastern and central Canada, northeastern United States	Berries, edible raw, commonly used in jams and jellies	

=== Herbaceous plants ===
Plant image	Part image	Common name	Binomial name	Distribution	Edible parts and uses	Ref.
		Yarrow	Achillea millefolium	Native to temperate regions of the Northern Hemisphere	All parts in small quantity, leaves when young	
		Amaranth, pigweed, tumbleweed	Amaranthus retroflexus	Native to the tropical Americas, but widespread worldwide	Leaves, boiled as a vegetable, or raw with the shoots if young Seeds, raw or toasted, or ground to flour	
		Spear saltbush, common orache	Atriplex patula	Semi-arid deserts and coastal areas in Asia, North America, Europe, and Africa	Young leaves and shoots, raw or cooked as a substitute for spinach	
		Ice plant, sour fig	Carpobrotus edulis	South Africa and many zones with a similar climate, including Australia, California and the Mediterranean	Figs (May to July); edible raw	
		Fat-hen, wild spinach	Chenopodium album	Worldwide in soils rich in nitrogen, especially on wasteland	Leaves and young shoots; edible raw or prepared as a green vegetable	
		Good-King-Henry	Chenopodium bonus-henricus	Most of Europe, West Asia and eastern North America	Young shoots (until early summer) and leaves (until August). The shoots can be cooked like asparagus, and the leaves like spinach.	
		Cogongrass	Imperata cylindrica	Native to tropical and subtropical Asia, but found worldwide as an invasive species from 45°N to 45°S	Young inflorescences and shoots, cooked; roots, edible raw when chewed; ash, as a salt substitute	
		Poppy	Papaver rhoeas	Worldwide, principally in the northern temperate zones	Seeds (from September, when the seed heads are dry, gray-brown and holed); edible raw as a spice or flavoring	
		Samphire, glasswort, pickleweed, sea beans, sea asparagus	Salicornia species	Seashores and other salty habitats in the northern hemisphere and southern Africa	Young shoots (June or July); edible raw or cooked, also pickled	
		Bladder campion, maidenstears	Silene vulgaris	As a wildflower in the temperate zones of Europe, Western Asia, North Africa and North America, on dry, sunny, calcareous grassland	Young shoots and leaves, raw, older leaves also cooked; a local specialty in parts of the Mediterranean region	
		Chickweed	Stellaria media	Worldwide, as an annual in colder climates, and a perennial evergreen elsewhere	Stems and leaves, raw or cooked	
		Dandelion	Taraxacum officinale	Native to Eurasia, naturalized elsewhere	Leaves, edible raw or cooked when older	
		Cattail	Typha spp.	Temperate Northern Hemisphere and Australasia	Rhizomes; Young and inner shoots and stems Cooked flowers	
		Stinging nettle	Urtica dioica	Very common in Europe and Asia, less common in North America	Young shoots and leaves (until May), edible after soaking or boiling as a vegetable, or as a soup or purée	

== See also ==
- Sansai, foraged plants in Japanese cuisine
- Wild edible plants of Israel and Palestine
