= Tordylium maximum =

Scientific classification
- Kingdom: Plantae
- Clade: Tracheophytes
- Clade: Angiosperms
- Clade: Eudicots
- Clade: Asterids
- Order: Apiales
- Family: Apiaceae
- Genus: Tordylium
- Species: T. maximum

Binomial name
- Tordylium maximum L.

Synonyms
- Caucalis maxima (L.) Vest; Heracleum tordylium Spreng.; Pastinaca maxima (L.) Koso-Pol.; Selinum tordyliastrum E.H.L.Krause, nom. illeg.

Species of flowering plant

Tordylium maximum, known as hartwort, is an annual or biennial flowering plant in the carrot family (Apiaceae).

== Description ==
Tordylium maximum is a hairy or bristly biennial or annual, growing to about 30–130 cm (1.0–4.3 ft) tall, with a hollow ridged stem that is usually branched. The lower leaves are pinnate, with two to five pairs of coarsely toothed leaflets. The upper leaves may be reduced to a single leaflet. The flowers are arranged in flat umbels, with 5–15 rays. Like other members of the genus Tordylium, the flowers are white, with the outer flowers having some much longer petals on the outer side of the umbel. The fruits are 5–8 mm (0.20–0.31 in) long.

== Taxonomy ==
Tordylium maximum was first described by Carl Linnaeus in 1753 in Species Plantarum.

== Distribution ==
Tordylium maximum is a species of south and south central Europe, probably not native in the northern parts of its range. It has been found in south-east England, but only in one location in south Essex since 1875.
