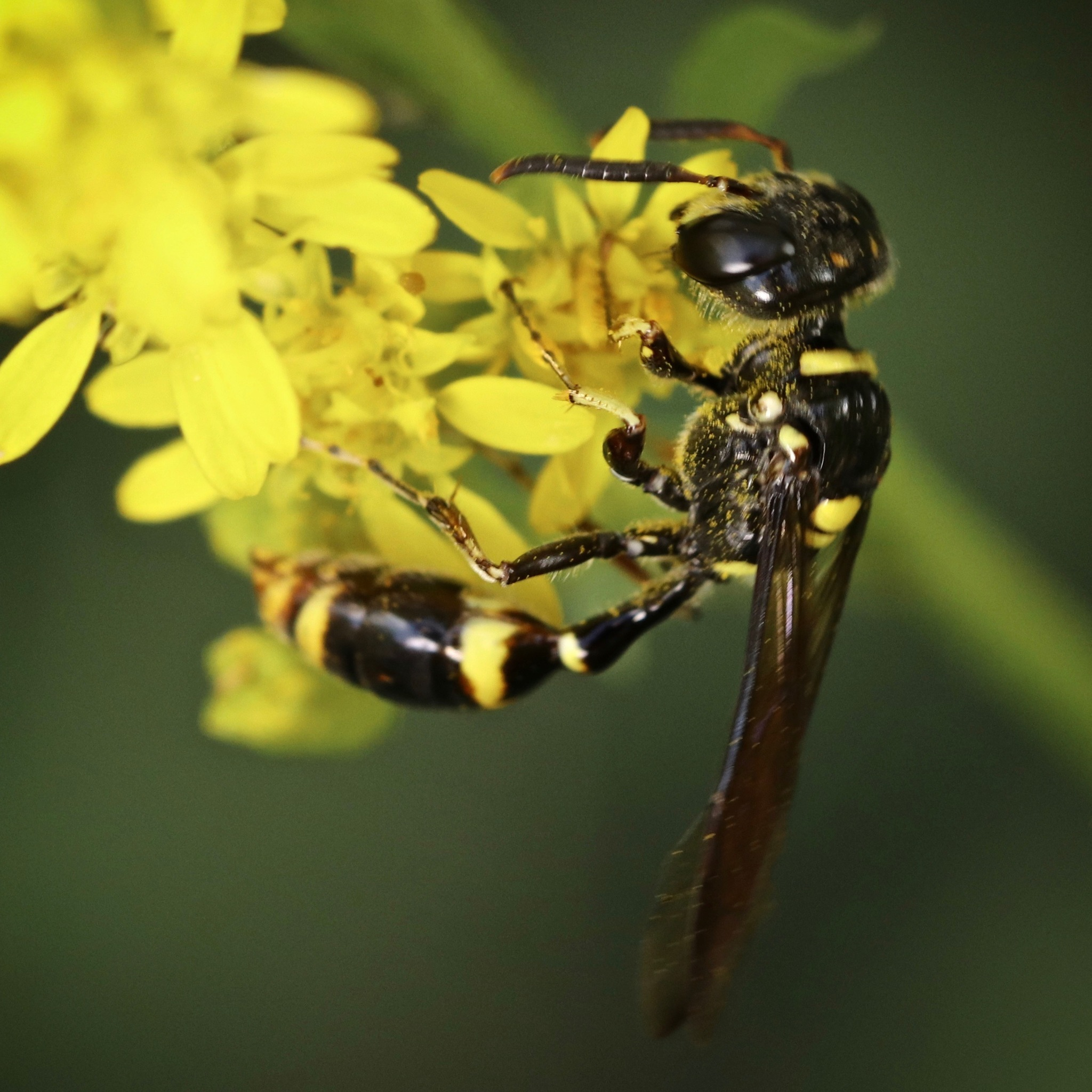

Scientific classification
- Domain: Eukaryota
- Kingdom: Animalia
- Phylum: Arthropoda
- Class: Insecta
- Order: Hymenoptera
- Family: Philanthidae
- Tribe: Philanthini
- Genus: Trachypus
- Species: T. mexicanus

Binomial name
- Trachypus mexicanus de Saussure, 1867

Synonyms
- Trachypus annulitarsis Cameron, 1908

= Trachypus mexicanus =

Species of wasp

Trachypus mexicanus is a species of wasp in the family Philanthidae. It is found in Central America.
