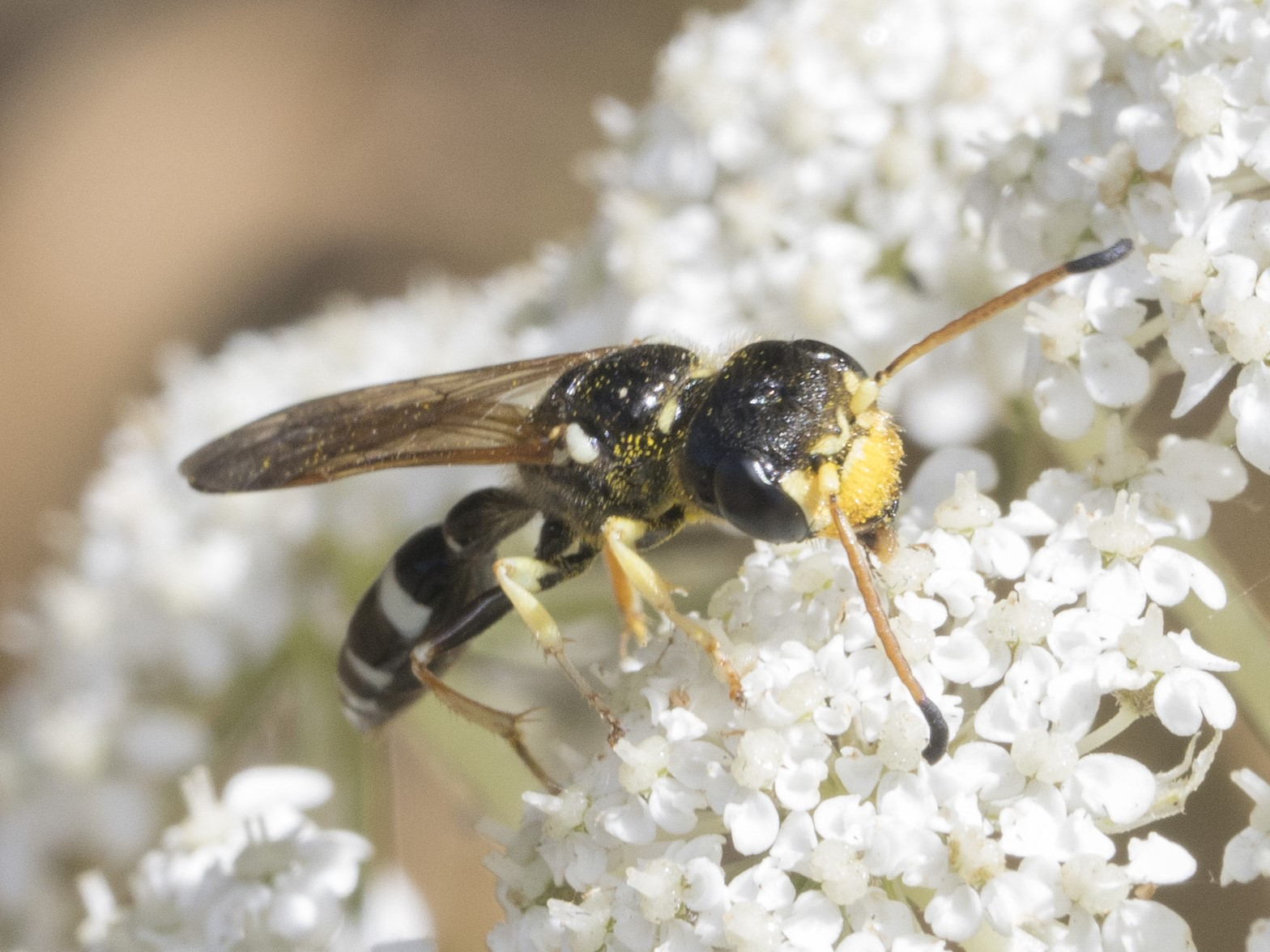
- Trachypus denticollis

Scientific classification
- Domain: Eukaryota
- Kingdom: Animalia
- Phylum: Arthropoda
- Class: Insecta
- Order: Hymenoptera
- Family: Philanthidae
- Tribe: Philanthini
- Genus: Trachypus; Klug, 1810

Synonyms
- Philanthocephalus Cameron, 1890; Simblephilus Cameron, 1890

= Trachypus =

Genus of wasps

Trachypus is a genus of wasps in the family Philanthidae. There are 31 described species in Trachypus.

== Species ==
These 31 species belong to the genus Trachypus:

- Trachypus annulatus Spinola, 1851
- Trachypus basalis F. Smith, 1873
- Trachypus batrachostomus Schrottky, 1909
- Trachypus boharti Rubio-Espina, 1975
- Trachypus caenosus Rubio-Espina, 1975
- Trachypus cementarius (F. Smith, 1860)
- Trachypus cisminutus Rubio-Espina, 1975
- Trachypus clypeatus Rubio-Espina, 1975
- Trachypus denticollis Spinola, 1851
- Trachypus disjunctus F. Smith, 1873
- Trachypus elongatus (Fabricius, 1804)
- Trachypus fasciatus Rubio-Espina, 1975
- Trachypus flavidus (Taschenberg, 1875)
- Trachypus fulvipennis (Taschenberg, 1875)
- Trachypus gerstaeckeri Dewitz, 1881
- Trachypus gracilis (Cameron, 1890)
- Trachypus hirticeps (Cameron, 1890)
- Trachypus mandibularis Rubio-Espina, 1975
- Trachypus mexicanus de Saussure, 1867
- Trachypus miles Schrottky, 1909
- Trachypus minutus Rubio-Espina, 1975
- Trachypus patagonensis (de Saussure, 1854)
- Trachypus peruviensis Rubio-Espina, 1975
- Trachypus petiolatus (Spinola, 1842)
- Trachypus romandi (de Saussure, 1854)
- Trachypus soniae Rubio-Espina, 1975
- Trachypus spegazzinii Brèthes, 1910
- Trachypus spinosus Rubio-Espina, 1975
- Trachypus stictosus Rubio-Espina, 1975
- Trachypus taschenbergi Rubio-Espina, 1975
- Trachypus varius (Taschenberg, 1875)
