= List of native plants of Flora Palaestina (C–D) =

Flora of Palestine

This is an incomplete list of 2,700 species of vascular plants which are native to the region of Palestine as defined by Flora Palaestina. Flora Palaestina is a work in four volumes published by Brill Academic Publishers between 1966 and 1986, edited by Michael Zohary and Naomi Feinbrun-Dothan. The region covered includes: the whole area of the State of Israel; the West Bank; the Gaza Strip; the Golan Heights; the Israeli-occupied part of Mount Hermon; and the East Bank, which is in Jordan.

The table below lists alphabetically all species with initial letters C–D. For other species, click here:

- A–B
- E–O
- P–Z

	Binomial name	Family	Hebrew name	English name	Arabic name	Notes	Image
455	Cakile maritima	Brassicaceae	דו-פרק חופי				
456	Calamintha incana	Lamiaceae	כלמינתה אפורה				
457	Calendula arvensis	Asteraceae	צפורני-חתול מצויות		henwa (for the species)	East of Azraq, ashbet al ghurab is also used.	
458	Calendula pachysperma	Asteraceae	צפורני-חתול עבות				
459	Calendula palaestina	Asteraceae	ציפורני-חתול ארץ-ישראליות				
460	Calendula tripterocarpa	Asteraceae	צפורני-חתול מכונפות				
461	Calepina irregularis	Brassicaceae	חלבינה מרושתת				
462	Calicotome villosa	Papilionaceae	קידה שעירה				
463	Calligonum comosum	Polygonaceae	שבטוט מצויץ				
464	Callipeltis aperta	Rubiaceae	מגנונית פרושה				
465	Callipeltis cucullaria	Rubiaceae	מגנונית כבונה				
466	Callipeltis factorovskyi	Rubiaceae	מגנונית פקטורי				
467	Callitriche brutia	Callitrichaceae	טובענית העקצים				
468	Callitriche lenisulca	Callitrichaceae	טובענית אביבית				
469	Callitriche naftolskyi	Callitrichaceae	טובענית נפתולסקי				
470	Callitriche stagnalis	Callitrichaceae	טובענית הפלגים				
471	Callitriche truncata	Callitrichaceae	טובענית קטומה				
472	Calotropis procera	Asclepiadaceae	פתילת-המדבר הגדולה				
473	Calystegia sepium	Convolvulaceae	חבלבלן המשוכות				
474	Calystegia soldanella	Convolvulaceae	חבלבלן עגול-עלים				
475	Camelina hispida	Brassicaceae	קמלינה סמורה				
476	Campanula camptoclada	Campanulaceae	פעמונית החומות				
477	Campanula cymbalaria	Campanulaceae	פעמונית הצלצל				
478	Campanula damascena	Campanulaceae	פעמונית דמשקאית				
479	Campanula erinus	Campanulaceae	פעמונית קטנה				
480	Campanula hierosolymitana	Campanulaceae	פעמונית ירושלים				
481	Campanula kotschyana	Campanulaceae	פעמונית קוטשי				
482	Campanula peregrina	Campanulaceae	פעמונית הדורה				
483	Campanula phrygia	Campanulaceae	פעמונית מסועפת				
484	Campanula rapunculus	Campanulaceae	פעמונית קיפחת				
485	Campanula retrorsa	Campanulaceae	פעמונית משוננת				
486	Campanula sidoniensis	Campanulaceae	פעמונית צידונית				
487	Campanula stellaris	Campanulaceae	פעמונית כוכבנית				
488	Campanula stricta	Campanulaceae	פעמונית אמתית				
489	Campanula strigosa	Campanulaceae	פעמונית זיפנית				
490	Campanula sulphurea	Campanulaceae	פעמונית גפורה				
491	Capnophyllum peregrinum	Apiaceae	גבשונית השדה				
492	Capparis aegyptia	Capparaceae	צלף מצרי				
493	Capparis decidua	Capparaceae	צלף רותמי				
494	Capparis sicula	Capparaceae	צלף סיצילי				
495	Capparis sinaica	Capparaceae	צלף סחוסי				
496	Capparis spinosa	Capparaceae	צלף קוצני				
497	Capsella bursa-pastoris	Brassicaceae	ילקוט הרועים				
498	Capsella rubella	Brassicaceae	ילקוט אדום				
499	Caralluma europaea	Asclepiadaceae	אצבוע אירופי				
500	Caralluma sinaica	Asclepiadaceae	אצבוע ים-המלח				
501	Caralluma tuberculata	Asclepiadaceae	אצבוע מגובשש				
502	Cardamine hirsuta	Brassicaceae	קרדמין שעיר				
503	Cardaria draba	Brassicaceae	קרדריה מצויה				
504	Cardopatium corymbosum	Asteraceae	נעצוצית סבוכה				
505	Carduncellus eriocephalus	Asteraceae	קרדנית צמירה				
506	Carduus argentatus	Asteraceae	קרדה מכסיפה				
507	Carduus australis	Asteraceae	קרדה דרומית				
508	Carduus getulus	Asteraceae	קרדת המדבר				
509	Carex acutiformis	Cyperaceae	כריך חד				
510	Carex distans	Cyperaceae	כריך מרוחק				
511	Carex divisa	Cyperaceae	כריך מחולק				
512	Carex extensa	Cyperaceae	כריך רווח				
513	Carex flacca	Cyperaceae	כריך אפרפר				
514	Carex guestphalica	Cyperaceae	כריך החורש				
515	Carex hallerana	Cyperaceae	כריך נמוך				
516	Carex hispida	Cyperaceae	כריך שעיר				
517	Carex otrubae	Cyperaceae	כריך שחום				
518	Carex pachystylis	Cyperaceae	כריך הערבות				
519	Carex pairae	Cyperaceae	כריך החולה				
520	Carex pseudocyperus	Cyperaceae	כריך גומאי				
521	Carlina curetum	Asteraceae	קיצנית כרתית				
522	Carlina lanata	Asteraceae	קיצנית צמרנית				
523	Carlina libanotica	Asteraceae	קיצנית צפופת-עלים				
524	Carlina racemosa	Asteraceae	קיצנית אשכולית				
525	Carrichtera annua	Brassicaceae	כפיות שעירות				
526	Carthamus glaucus	Asteraceae	קורטם מכחיל				
527	Carthamus nitidus	Asteraceae	קורטם מבריק				
528	Carthamus persicus	Asteraceae	קורטם פרסי				
529	Carthamus tenuis	Asteraceae	קורטם דק				
530	Castellia tuberculosa	Poaceae	מצדית מגובששת				
531	Catabrosa aquatica	Poaceae	ספה המים				
532	Catananche lutea	Asteraceae	אוזן-גדי צהובה				
533	Catapodium marinum	Poaceae	סיסן זוני				
534	Catapodium rigidum	Poaceae	סיסן אשון				
535	Caylusea hexagyna	Resedaceae	ששן מאפיר				
536	Celtis australis	Cannabaceae	מיש דרומי				
537	Centaurea aegyptiaca	Asteraceae	דרדר מצרי		قنطريون مصري		
538	Centaurea ammocyanus	Asteraceae	דרדר הערבות				
539	Centaurea ascalonica	Asteraceae	דרדר אשקלון		قنطريون عسقلاني		
540	Centaurea balsamita	Asteraceae	דרדר החרצית				
541	Centaurea behen	Asteraceae	דרדר גלדני				
542	Centaurea crocodylium	Asteraceae	דרדר גדול-פרחים		قنطريون تمساحي		
543	Centaurea cyanoides	Asteraceae	דרדר כחול				
544	Centaurea damascena	Asteraceae	דרדר דמשקאי		قنطريون دمشقي		
545	Centaurea drabifolia	Asteraceae	דרדר הלבנון				
546	Centaurea eryngioides	Asteraceae	דרדר החרחבינה				
547	Centaurea hyalolepis	Asteraceae	דרדר קרומי				
548	Centaurea iberica	Asteraceae	דרדר מצוי		قنطريون أيبيري		
549	Centaurea lanulata	Asteraceae	דרדר צמרני				
550	Centaurea onopordifolia	Asteraceae	דרדר חוחני				
551	Centaurea pallescens	Asteraceae	דרדר המדבר				
552	Centaurea procurrens	Asteraceae	דרדר הקורים				
553	Centaurea pumilio	Asteraceae	דרדר נמוך		قنطريون قزم		
554	Centaurea rigida	Asteraceae	דרדר אלף-ראשים		قنطريون جامد		
555	Centaurea scoparia	Asteraceae	דרדר המכבד		قنطريون متجمع		
556	Centaurea sinaica	Asteraceae	דרדר סיני		mrâr - مرار أو قنطريون سينائي	Also 'amrâr for pink Centaurea sp.	
557	Centaurea solstitialis	Asteraceae	דרדר אביבי				
558	Centaurea speciosa	Asteraceae	דרדר נאה		قنطريون خلاب		
559	Centaurea triumfettii	Asteraceae	דרדר ססגוני				
560	Centaurea verutum	Asteraceae	דרדר קיפח		قنطريون رمحي		
561	Centaurium erythraea	Gentianaceae	ערבז סוככני				
562	Centaurium maritimum	Gentianaceae	ערבז החוף				
563	Centaurium spicatum	Gentianaceae	ערבז משובל				
564	Centaurium tenuiflorum	Gentianaceae	ערבז דק-פרחים				
565	Centranthus longiflorus	Valerianaceae	חד-אבקן אדום				
566	Centropodia forskalii	Poaceae	דנתוניית החולות				
567	Cephalanthera longifolia	Orchidaceae	סחלבן החורש				
568	Cephalaria joppensis	Dipsacaceae	שלמון יפואי				
569	Cephalaria setosa	Dipsacaceae	שלמון זיפני				
570	Cephalaria stellipilis	Dipsacaceae	שלמון כוכבני				
571	Cephalaria syriaca	Dipsacaceae	שלמון סורי				
572	Cephalaria tenella	Dipsacaceae	שלמון דק				
573	Cephalorrhynchus tuberosus	Asteraceae	חסנית דביקה				
574	Cerastium dichotomum	Caryophyllaceae	קרנונית דו-בדית				
575	Cerastium dubium	Caryophyllaceae	קרנונית לקויה				
576	Cerastium fragillimum	Caryophyllaceae	קרנונית שבירה				
577	Cerastium glomeratum	Caryophyllaceae	קרנונית דביקה				
578	Cerastium illyricum	Caryophyllaceae	קרנונית שעירה				
579	Cerastium inflatum	Caryophyllaceae	קרנונית נפוחה				
580	Cerasus microcarpa	Rosaceae	דובדבן קטן-פרי				
581	Cerasus prostrata	Rosaceae	דובדבן שרוע				
582	Ceratocapnos turbinata	Fumariaceae	בר-עשנן ארץ-ישראלי				
583	Ceratocephala falcata	Ranunculaceae	בר-נורית חרמשי				
584	Ceratonia siliqua	Caesalpiniaceae	חרוב מצוי				
585	Ceratophyllum demersum	Ceratophyllaceae	קרנן טבוע				
586	Ceratophyllum submersum	Ceratophyllaceae	קרנן טבול				
587	Cercis siliquastrum	Caesalpiniaceae	כליל החורש				
588	Cerinthe palaestina	Boraginaceae	דונגית ארץ-ישראלית				
589	Chaerophyllum aurantiacum	Apiaceae	כרופילון זהוב				
590	Chaetosciadium trichospermum	Apiaceae	שערור שעיר				
591	Chardinia orientalis	Asteraceae	שרדיניה מוצנית				
592	Cheilanthes acrostica	Sinopteridaceae	שרכרך ריחני				
593	Chenopodium album	Chenopodiaceae	כף-אווז לבנה				
594	Chenopodium ambrosioides	Chenopodiaceae	כף-אווז ריחנית				
595	Chenopodium foliosum	Chenopodiaceae	כף-אווז רבת-עלים				
596	Chenopodium missouriense	Chenopodiaceae	כף-אווז מיזורי				
597	Chenopodium murale	Chenopodiaceae	כף-אווז האשפות				
598	Chenopodium opulifolium	Chenopodiaceae	כף-אווז הגינות				
599	Chenopodium polyspermum	Chenopodiaceae	כף-אווז גדושה				
600	Chenopodium rubrum	Chenopodiaceae	כף-אווז אדומה				
601	Chenopodium vulvaria	Chenopodiaceae	כף-אווז מבאישה				
602	Chiliadenus iphionoides	Asteraceae	כתלה חריפה				
603	Chiliadenus montanus	Asteraceae	כתלה מדברית				
604	Chlamydophora tridentata	Asteraceae	אזנן משולשן				
605	Chloris barbata	Poaceae	עשבה שעירה				
606	Chondrilla juncea	Asteraceae	כונדרילה סמרנית				
607	Chorispora purpurascens	Brassicaceae	קרן-יעל סורית				
608	Chrozophora obliqua	Euphorbiaceae	לשישית הבוצין				
609	Chrozophora oblongifolia	Euphorbiaceae	לשישית השיח				
610	Chrozophora plicata	Euphorbiaceae	לשישית מקומטת				
611	Chrozophora tinctoria	Euphorbiaceae	לשישית הצבעים				
612	Chrysanthemum coronarium	Asteraceae	חרצית עטורה				
613	Chrysanthemum myconis	Asteraceae	חרצית משוננת				
614	Chrysanthemum segetum	Asteraceae	חרצית השדות				
615	Chrysanthemum viscosum	Asteraceae	חרצית דביקה				
616	Cicer judaicum	Papilionaceae	חמצה שסועה				
617	Cichorium endivia	Asteraceae	עולש מצוי				
618	Cirsium alatum	Asteraceae	קוצן מכונף				
619	Cirsium arvense	Asteraceae	קוצן השדה				
620	Cirsium gaillardotii	Asteraceae	קוצן גיירדו				
621	Cirsium lappaceum	Asteraceae	קוצן חרמוני				
622	Cirsium phyllocephalum	Asteraceae	קוצן קפח				
623	Cirsium vulgare	Asteraceae	קוצן פשוט				
624	Cistanche salsa	Orobanchaceae	יחנוק המלחות				
625	Cistanche tubulosa	Orobanchaceae	יחנוק המדבר				
626	Cistus creticus	Cistaceae	לוטם שעיר				
627	Cistus salviifolius	Cistaceae	לוטם מרווני				
628	Citrullus colocynthis	Cucurbitaceae	אבטיח הפקועה				
629	Cladium mariscus	Cyperaceae	מכבד הביצות				
630	Clematis cirrhosa	Ranunculaceae	זלזלת הקנוקנות		ظيان متليف		
631	Clematis flammula	Ranunculaceae	זלזלת מנוצה		ظيان شعلي		
632	Cleome amblyocarpa	Capparaceae	באשן תלתני				
633	Cleome arabica	Capparaceae	באשן תמים				
634	Cleome droserifolia	Capparaceae	באשן עגול-עלים				
635	Clinopodium vulgare	Lamiaceae	קלינופודיון מנוצה				
636	Clypeola aspera	Brassicaceae	תריסנית שיכנית				
637	Clypeola jonthlaspi	Brassicaceae	תריסנית מלולה				
638	Clypeola lappacea	Brassicaceae	תריסנית מחודדת				
639	Cnicus benedictus	Asteraceae	קרצף מבורך				
640	Cocculus pendulus	Menispermaceae	סהרון משתלשל				
641	Colchicum brachyphyllum	Liliaceae	סתוונית קצרת-עלים				
642	Colchicum falcifolium	Liliaceae	סתוונית החרמון				
643	Colchicum feinbruniae	Liliaceae	סתוונית התשבץ				
644	Colchicum hierosolymitanum	Liliaceae	סתוונית ירושלים				
645	Colchicum ritchii	Liliaceae	סתוונית הנגב				
646	Colchicum schimperi	Liliaceae	סתוונית שימפר				
647	Colchicum stevenii	Liliaceae	סתוונית היורה				
648	Colchicum troodi	Liliaceae	סתוונית בכירה				
649	Colchicum tunicatum	Liliaceae	סתוונית הקלפות				
650	Colchicum tuviae	Liliaceae	סתוונית טוביה				
651	Colutea cilicica	Papilionaceae	קרקש קיליקי				
652	Colutea istria	Papilionaceae	קרקש צהוב				
653	Cometes abyssinica	Caryophyllaceae	שביט אתיופי				
654	Commicarpus helenae	Nyctaginaceae	בלוטנית הדורים				
655	Commicarpus plumbagineus	Nyctaginaceae	בלוטנית אפריקנית				
656	Commicarpus sinuatus	Nyctaginaceae	בלוטנית מפורצת				
657	Conium maculatum	Apiaceae	רוש עקוד				
658	Conringia orientalis	Brassicaceae	ארכן מזרחי				
659	Consolida flava	Ranunculaceae	בר-דורבן צהוב				
660	Consolida hispanica	Ranunculaceae	בר-דורבן מזרחי				
661	Consolida incana	Ranunculaceae	בר-דורבן אשון				
662	Consolida scleroclada	Ranunculaceae	בר-דורבן הסירה				
663	Convolvulus althaeoides	Convolvulaceae	חבלבל כפני				
664	Convolvulus arvensis	Convolvulaceae	חבלבל השדה				
665	Convolvulus auricomus	Convolvulaceae	חבלבל מגובב				
666	Convolvulus betonicifolius	Convolvulaceae	חבלבל שעיר				
667	Convolvulus cantabrica	Convolvulaceae	חבלבל איטלקי				
668	Convolvulus coelesyriacus	Convolvulaceae	חבלבל סורי				
669	Convolvulus dorycnium	Convolvulaceae	חבלבל השיח				
670	Convolvulus fatmensis	Convolvulaceae	חבלבל מצרי				
671	Convolvulus humilis	Convolvulaceae	חבלבל גלוני				
672	Convolvulus lanatus	Convolvulaceae	חבלבל צמיר				
673	Convolvulus libanoticus	Convolvulaceae	חבלבל הלבנון				
674	Convolvulus oleifolius	Convolvulaceae	חבלבל זיתני				
675	Convolvulus palaestinus	Convolvulaceae	חבלבל ארץ-ישראלי				
676	Convolvulus pentapetaloides	Convolvulaceae	חבלבל עדין				
677	Convolvulus pilosellifolius	Convolvulaceae	חבלבל מדברי				
678	Convolvulus scammonia	Convolvulaceae	חבלבל רפואי				
679	Convolvulus secundus	Convolvulaceae	חבלבל החוף				
680	Convolvulus siculus	Convolvulaceae	חבלבל סיצילי				
681	Convolvulus spicatus	Convolvulaceae	חבלבל משובל				
682	Convolvulus stachydifolius	Convolvulaceae	חבלבל המשי				
683	Convolvulus tricolor	Convolvulaceae	חבלבל שלש-גוני				
684	Conyza stricta	Asteraceae	קייצת שלש-אונות				
685	Corchorus olitorius	Tiliaceae	מלוכיה נאכלת		mulūkhiyyah ملوخية	Mulukhiyah	
686	Corchorus trilocularis	Tiliaceae	מלוכיה משולשת				
687	Cordia sinensis	Boraginaceae	גופנן המדבר				
688	Cordylocarpus muricatus	Brassicaceae	אבריים מגובששים				
689	Coriandrum sativum	Apiaceae	גד השדה				
690	Coridothymus capitatus	Lamiaceae	קורנית מקורקפת				
691	Cornucopiae alopecuroides	Poaceae	כוסנית ממולענת				
692	Cornucopiae cucullatum	Poaceae	כוסנית משוננת				
693	Cornulaca monacantha	Chenopodiaceae	סרב חד-קוצי				
694	Coronilla repanda	Papilionaceae	כתרון גלוני				
695	Coronilla scorpioides	Papilionaceae	כתרון עקרבי				
696	Coronopus squamatus	Brassicaceae	שחליל שרוע				
697	Corrigiola litoralis	Caryophyllaceae	שרוכנית החוף				
698	Corrigiola palaestina	Caryophyllaceae	שרוכנית ארץ-ישראלית				
699	Corydalis erdelii	Fumariaceae	קורידלית פיגמית				
700	Corydalis triternata	Fumariaceae	קורידלית הסלעים				
701	Corynephorus articulatus	Poaceae	אלית המפרק				
702	Cosentinia vellea	Sinopteridaceae	שרכרך הסלעים				
703	Cotoneaster nummularius	Rosaceae	חבושית המטבעות				
704	Cousinia hermonis	Asteraceae	קוסיניה חרמונית				
705	Cousinia libanotica	Asteraceae	קוסיניית הלבנון				
706	Cousinia moabitica	Asteraceae	קוסיניה מואבית				
707	Crambe hispanica	Brassicaceae	כרבה ספרדית				
708	Crambe orientalis	Brassicaceae	כרבה מזרחית				
709	Crassula alata	Crassulaceae	קרסולה מכונפת				
710	Crassula vaillantii	Crassulaceae	קרסולת השלולית				
711	Crataegus aronia	Rosaceae	עוזרר קוצני				
712	Crataegus azarolus	Rosaceae	עוזרר אדום				
713	Crataegus monogyna	Rosaceae	עוזרר חד-גלעיני				
714	Crataegus sinaicus	Rosaceae	עוזרר סיני				
715	Crepis aculeata	Asteraceae	ניסנית שיכנית				
716	Crepis aspera	Asteraceae	ניסנית זיפנית				
717	Crepis foetida	Asteraceae	ניסנית מבאישה				
718	Crepis hierosolymitana	Asteraceae	ניסנית ירושלמית				
719	Crepis micrantha	Asteraceae	ניסנית קטנת-פרחים				
720	Crepis palaestina	Asteraceae	ניסנית ארץ-ישראלית				
721	Crepis pterothecoides	Asteraceae	ניסנית מכונפת				
722	Crepis pulchra	Asteraceae	ניסנית נאה				
723	Crepis reuteriana	Asteraceae	ניסנית כינורית				
724	Crepis robertioides	Asteraceae	ניסנית מעוצה				
725	Crepis sancta	Asteraceae	ניסנית דו-קרנית				
726	Crepis senecioides	Asteraceae	ניסנית ערבית				
727	Crepis syriaca	Asteraceae	ניסנית סורית				
728	Crepis zacintha	Asteraceae	ניסנית מיובלת				
729	Cressa cretica	Convolvulaceae	ערר כרתי				
730	Crithmum maritimum	Apiaceae	קריתמון ימי				
731	Crithopsis delileana	Poaceae	בן-שעורה מצוי				
732	Crocus aleppicus	Iridaceae	כרכום גיירדו				
733	Crocus cancellatus	Iridaceae	כרכום השבכה				
734	Crocus damascenus	Iridaceae	כרכום דמשקאי				
735	Crocus hermoneus	Iridaceae	כרכום החרמון				
736	Crocus hyemalis	Iridaceae	כרכום חורפי				
737	Crocus ochroleucus	Iridaceae	כרכום צהבהב				
738	Crocus pallasii	Iridaceae	כרכום נאה				
739	Crocus vitellinus	Iridaceae	כרכום חלמוני				
740	Crotalaria aegyptiaca	Papilionaceae	קרוטלריה מצרית				
741	Crucianella aegyptiaca	Rubiaceae	צלבית עשבונית				
742	Crucianella ciliata	Rubiaceae	צלבית ריסנית				
743	Crucianella latifolia	Rubiaceae	צלבית רחבת-עלים				
744	Crucianella macrostachya	Rubiaceae	צלבית ארוכת-שיבולת				
745	Crucianella maritima	Rubiaceae	צלבית החוף				
746	Crucianella membranacea	Rubiaceae	צלבית קרומית				
747	Crucianella transjordanica	Rubiaceae	צלבית עבר-הירדן				
748	Cruciata articulata	Rubiaceae	דבקנית הפרקים				
749	Cruciata coronata	Rubiaceae	דבקנית עטורה				
750	Cruciata pedemontana	Rubiaceae	דבקנית שעירה				
751	Crupina crupinastrum	Asteraceae	דרדית מצויה				
752	Crypsis aculeata	Poaceae	עטיינית דו-אבקנית				
753	Crypsis acuminata	Poaceae	עטיינית ארוכה				
754	Crypsis alopecuroides	Poaceae	עטיינית דקה				
755	Crypsis factorovskyi	Poaceae	עטיינית פקטורי				
756	Crypsis minuartioides	Poaceae	עטיינית מגובבת				
757	Crypsis schoenoides	Poaceae	עטיינית קצרה				
758	Ctenopsis pectinella	Poaceae	שעלבית מסרקנית				
759	Cucumis acidus	Cucurbitaceae	מלפפון משולש				
760	Cucumis prophetarum	Cucurbitaceae	מלפפון הנביאים				
761	Cupressus sempervirens	Cupressaceae	ברוש מצוי		سرو المتوسط		
762	Cuscuta approximata	Convolvulaceae	כשות הגליל		حماض الأرنب		
763	Cuscuta babylonica	Convolvulaceae	כשות בבלי		حامول بابلي		
764	Cuscuta brevistyla	Convolvulaceae	כשות קצר-עלי				
765	Cuscuta epilinum	Convolvulaceae	כשות הפשתה		حامول الكتان		
766	Cuscuta epithymum	Convolvulaceae	כשות הקורנית		حامول السعتر		
767	Cuscuta gennesaretana	Convolvulaceae	כשות כנרות				
768	Cuscuta kotschyana	Convolvulaceae	כשות קוטשי				
769	Cuscuta monogyna	Convolvulaceae	כשות גס		حامول الكرمة		
770	Cuscuta palaestina	Convolvulaceae	כשות ארץ-ישראלי		حامول فلسطيني		
771	Cuscuta pedicellata	Convolvulaceae	כשות העוקצים				
772	Cuscuta planiflora	Convolvulaceae	כשות שטוח-פרחים				
773	Cutandia dichotoma	Poaceae	חולית דו-קרנית				
774	Cutandia maritima	Poaceae	חולית החוף				
775	Cutandia memphitica	Poaceae	חולית מצרית				
776	Cyclamen coum	Primulaceae	רקפת יוונית				
777	Cyclamen persicum	Primulaceae	רקפת מצויה				
778	Cymbalaria muralis	Scrophulariaceae	צלצל החומות				
779	Cymbolaena griffithii	Asteraceae	גומד צר-עלים				
780	Cymbopogon commutatus	Poaceae	רב-זקן קירח				
781	Cymodocea nodosa	Cymodoceaceae	גלית גדולה				
782	Cymodocea rotundata	Cymodoceaceae	גלית מעוגלת				
783	Cynanchum acutum	Asclepiadaceae	חנק מחודד				
784	Cynara syriaca	Asteraceae	קנרס סורי				
785	Cynodon dactylon	Poaceae	יבלית מצויה				
786	Cynoglossum creticum	Boraginaceae	לשון-כלב כרתית				
787	Cynoglossum montanum	Boraginaceae	לשון-כלב הררית				
788	Cynomorium coccineum	Cynomoriaceae	טופל אדום				
789	Cynosurus callitrichus	Poaceae	זנב-כלב מצוי				
790	Cynosurus echinatus	Poaceae	זנב-כלב דוקרני				
791	Cynosurus effusus	Poaceae	זנב-כלב עדין				
792	Cyperus alopecuroides	Cyperaceae	גומא צפוף				
793	Cyperus alternifolius	Cyperaceae	גומא תרבותי				
794	Cyperus articulatus	Cyperaceae	גומא הפרקים				
795	Cyperus capitatus	Cyperaceae	גומא הקרקפת				
796	Cyperus corymbosus	Cyperaceae	גומא הירקון				
797	Cyperus difformis	Cyperaceae	גומא דו-אנפין				
798	Cyperus distachyos	Cyperaceae	גומא דל-שיבולים				
799	Cyperus dives	Cyperaceae	גומא שופע				
800	Cyperus eleusinoides	Cyperaceae	גומא צפוף-שיבולת				
801	Cyperus flavescens	Cyperaceae	גומא צהבהב				
802	Cyperus flavidus	Cyperaceae	גומא כדורי				
803	Cyperus fuscus	Cyperaceae	גומא חום				
804	Cyperus glaber	Cyperaceae	גומא קירח				
805	Cyperus jeminicus	Cyperaceae	גומא נאה				
806	Cyperus laevigatus	Cyperaceae	גומא חלקלק				
807	Cyperus latifolius	Cyperaceae	גומא רחב-עלים				
808	Cyperus longus	Cyperaceae	גומא ארוך				
809	Cyperus macrorrhizus	Cyperaceae	גומא מגובב				
810	Cyperus michelianus	Cyperaceae	גומא ננסי				
811	Cyperus nitidus	Cyperaceae	גומא אזמלני				
812	Cyperus odoratus	Cyperaceae	גומא ריחני				
813	Cyperus papyrus	Cyperaceae	גומא הפפירוס				
814	Cyperus polystachyos	Cyperaceae	גומא רב-שיבוליות				
815	Cyperus rotundus	Cyperaceae	גומא הפקעים				
816	Cyperus sharonensis	Cyperaceae	גומא שרוני				
817	Cytinus hypocistis	Rafflesiaceae	רימונית הלוטם				
818	Cytisopsis pseudocytisus	Papilionaceae	אכסף מבריק				
819	Dactylis glomerata	Poaceae	ציבורת ההרים				
820	Dactyloctenium aegyptium	Poaceae	בת-יבלית מצרית				
821	Dactylorrhiza romana	Orchidaceae	אצבענית רומאית				
822	Dalbergia sissoo	Papilionaceae	סיסם הודי				
823	Damasonium alisma	Alismataceae	דמסון כוכבני				
824	Damasonium polyspermum	Alismataceae	דמסון רב-זרעים				
825	Daphne linearifolia	Thymelaeaceae	דפנית צרת-עלים				
826	Datisca cannabina	Datiscaceae	דטיסקה קנבית				
827	Daucus aureus	Apiaceae	גזר זהוב				
828	Daucus broteri	Apiaceae	גזר מצוי				
829	Daucus carota	Apiaceae	גזר קיפח				
830	Daucus durieua	Apiaceae	גזר יושב				
831	Daucus glaber	Apiaceae	גזר החוף				
832	Daucus guttatus	Apiaceae	גזר עדין				
833	Daucus jordanicus	Apiaceae	גזר הירדן				
834	Delphinium ithaburense	Ranunculaceae	דורבנית התבור				
835	Delphinium peregrinum	Ranunculaceae	דורבנית סגולה				
836	Descurainia sophia	Brassicaceae	דקורניה מנוצה				
837	Desmazeria philistaea	Poaceae	אדמדמית פלשתית				
838	Desmostachya bipinnata	Poaceae	חילף החולות				
839	Deverra tortuosa	Apiaceae	קזוח עקום				
840	Deverra triradiata	Apiaceae	קזוח תלת-קרני				
841	Dianthus cyri	Caryophyllaceae	ציפורן החודים				
842	Dianthus libanotis	Caryophyllaceae	ציפורן הלבנון				
843	Dianthus micranthus	Caryophyllaceae	ציפורן קטן-פרחים				
844	Dianthus monadelphus	Caryophyllaceae	ציפורן יהודה				
845	Dianthus pendulus	Caryophyllaceae	ציפורן משתלשל				
846	Dianthus sinaicus	Caryophyllaceae	ציפורן סיני				
847	Dianthus strictus	Caryophyllaceae	ציפורן נקוד				
848	Dianthus tripunctatus	Caryophyllaceae	ציפורן חד-שנתי				
849	Dichanthium annulatum	Poaceae	זקנונית הטבעות				
850	Dichanthium foveolatum	Poaceae	זקנונית הגממות				
851	Digera muricata	Amaranthaceae	דיגרה מסורגת				
852	Digitaria ciliaris	Poaceae	אצבען ריסני				
853	Digitaria sanguinalis	Poaceae	אצבען מאדים				
854	Dinebra retroflexa	Poaceae	זנבה נטויה				
855	Dipcadi erythraeum	Liliaceae	כתריים אדמדמים				
856	Diplotaxis acris	Brassicaceae	טוריים מדבריים				
857	Diplotaxis erucoides	Brassicaceae	טוריים מצויים				
858	Diplotaxis harra	Brassicaceae	טוריים זיפניים				
859	Diplotaxis viminea	Brassicaceae	טוריים קטנים				
860	Dipsacus laciniatus	Dipsacaceae	קרד שסוע				
861	Dittrichia graveolens	Asteraceae	טיון חריף				
862	Dittrichia viscosa	Asteraceae	טיון דביק				
863	Doellia bovei	Asteraceae	פלומית בובה				
864	Dorycnium hirsutum	Papilionaceae	אחילוטוס שעיר				
865	Dorycnium rectum	Papilionaceae	אחילוטוס זקוף				
866	Draba oxycarpa	Brassicaceae	דרבה מחודדת				
867	Draba vesicaria	Brassicaceae	דרבה משולחפת				
868	Drabopsis nuda	Brassicaceae	דרבונית אביבית				
869	Dryopteris pallida	Aspidiaceae	שרכייה אשונה				

== Bibliography ==
- Lancaster, William; Lancaster, Fidelity (1999). People, land and water in the Arab Middle East: environments and landscapes in the Bilâd ash-Shâm. Taylor & Francis. ISBN 978-90-5702-322-4.
- Zohary, Michael; Feinbrun-Dothan, Naomi (1972). Flora Palaestina, Part 2, Volume 2. Israel Academy of Sciences and Humanities.
