= Babylonica =

Babylonica may refer to:

== Species ==
- Cuscuta babylonica, a species of parasitic plant
- Megachile babylonica, a species of bee
- Salix babylonica, also called weeping willow
- Zafra babylonica, a species of sea-snail

== Other ==
- De Captivate Babylonica, a work by Martin Luther
- Legatio Babylonica, a 16th-century work by Peter Martyr d'Anghiera

== See also ==
- Babyloniaca
  - Babyloniaca, a lost history of the Babylonian civilization written by Berossus.
