= C. vulgaris =

C. vulgaris may refer to:

- Calluna vulgaris ([common] heather), the sole species within the genus Calluna
- Carlina vulgaris, a thistle species
- Chara vulgaris, a green alga species
- Chlorella vulgaris, a green microalga species
- Crupina vulgaris, a daisy species

== Synonyms ==
- Crago vulgaris or Crangon vulgaris, synonyms for Crangon crangon, a shrimp species

== See also ==
- Vulgaris (disambiguation)
