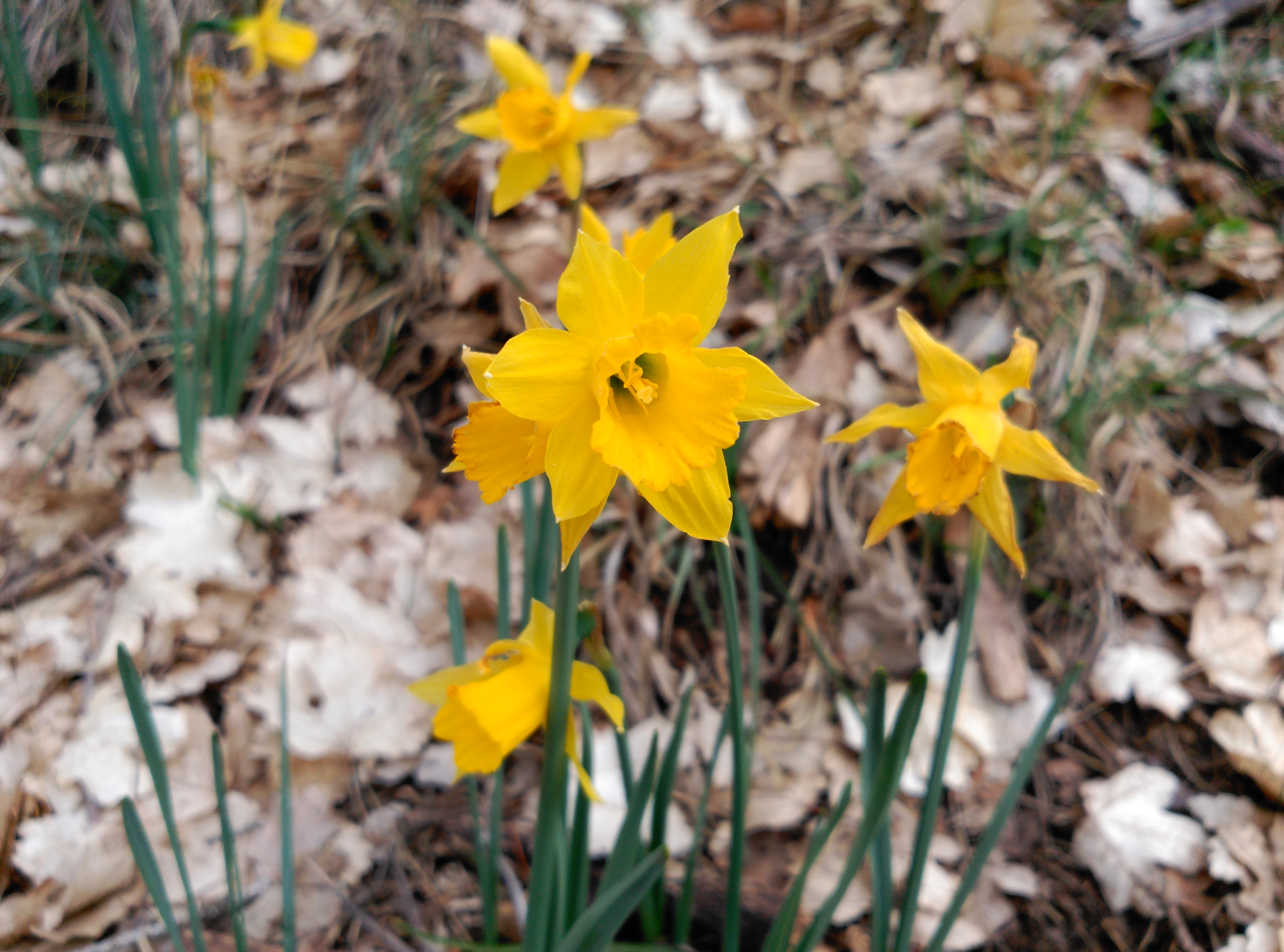

Conservation status
- Endangered (IUCN 3.1)

Scientific classification
- Kingdom: Plantae
- Clade: Tracheophytes
- Clade: Angiosperms
- Clade: Monocots
- Order: Asparagales
- Family: Amaryllidaceae
- Subfamily: Amaryllidoideae
- Genus: Narcissus
- Species: N. alcaracensis

Binomial name
- Narcissus alcaracensis Ríos, D.Rivera, Alcaraz & Obón

= Narcissus alcaracensis =

Species of daffodil

Narcissus alcaracensis is a species of bulbous plant that is endemic to Spain. Its natural habitats are rivers and swamps. It is threatened by habitat loss. The World Checklist of Selected Plant Families does not accept the name N. alcaracensis, regarding it as a synonym of the widespread N. hispanicus.

Narcissus alcaracensis has a very narrow range, found only in the Alcaraz mountains in Spain. It grows in marshes along with Carex hispida, in streams and shallow lakes. Agriculture continues to threaten the species, with the only surviving populations in nature reserves.

== Seed germination and dormancy ==
Narcissus alcaracensis produces small seeds (about 4 mm long) containing linear, underdeveloped embryos roughly 1.4 mm in length at dispersal. Before radicle emergence can occur, the embryo must elongate to a critical length of approximately 3.3 mm—a process that unfolds during months of cold, moist conditions (cold stratification) at around 5 °C. This requirement for both embryo growth and internal physiological change classifies the species as having intermediate complex morphophysiological dormancy (a dormancy type requiring both embryo development and biochemical dormancy‐breaking cues).

Under laboratory conditions, freshly harvested seeds exposed to 5 °C in darkness for three to four months followed by incubation at moderate temperatures (15 °C by day/4 °C by night) achieved germination rates of up to 75–90 %. Seeds stored dry for 12–24 months showed faster embryo growth and higher germination percentages, indicating that dry after‐ripening reduces dormancy depth. In simulated natural trials, embryo growth commenced in late autumn as temperatures fell, with most embryos reaching the critical size by February; seedlings then emerged in early spring, synchronising establishment with favourable moisture and temperature conditions while avoiding summer drought and winter frost damage.

== Conservation ==
Narcissus alcaracensis is listed as Endangered under IUCN criteria B1ab(i,ii,iii,v)+2ab(i,ii,iii,v), with an estimated area of occupancy restricted to about 8 km^{2} in two separate river basins of the Alcaraz Mountains in southern Spain. Only five localities are known, one of which has been extirpated, and the remaining records lie in highly fragmented subpopulations vulnerable to ongoing declines in range, habitat quality and mature individuals. The principal threats include unsustainable water abstraction for agriculture, which dries out the marshy stream-side habitats on which the species depends, together with overgrazing by sheep and goats and the abandonment of traditional land-management practices. These pressures encourage invasion by tall helophytes such as Phragmites australis, reducing competition from low-growing geophytes and further eroding habitat suitability. In addition, unresolved taxonomic confusion with closely related daffodils may hinder accurate monitoring and protection efforts.

To safeguard remaining populations, water-resource management must be prioritised to maintain natural hydrological regimes, while grazing pressure and trampling should be controlled through the establishment of micro-reserves or fencing in key stands. The species already occurs within Parque Natural de los Calares del Mundo y de la Sima, and further site-level protection—coupled with regular population and habitat monitoring—is recommended. Ex situ conservation measures are well under way: seed collections are held in national and regional genebanks, and living collections have been established at botanical gardens in Albacete and Alicante, where both seed-based propagation and in vitro culture techniques have proved successful. Future efforts should include continued cultivation for potential reinforcement plantings, plus detailed taxonomic research to clarify species boundaries and ensure that conservation resources are accurately targeted.
