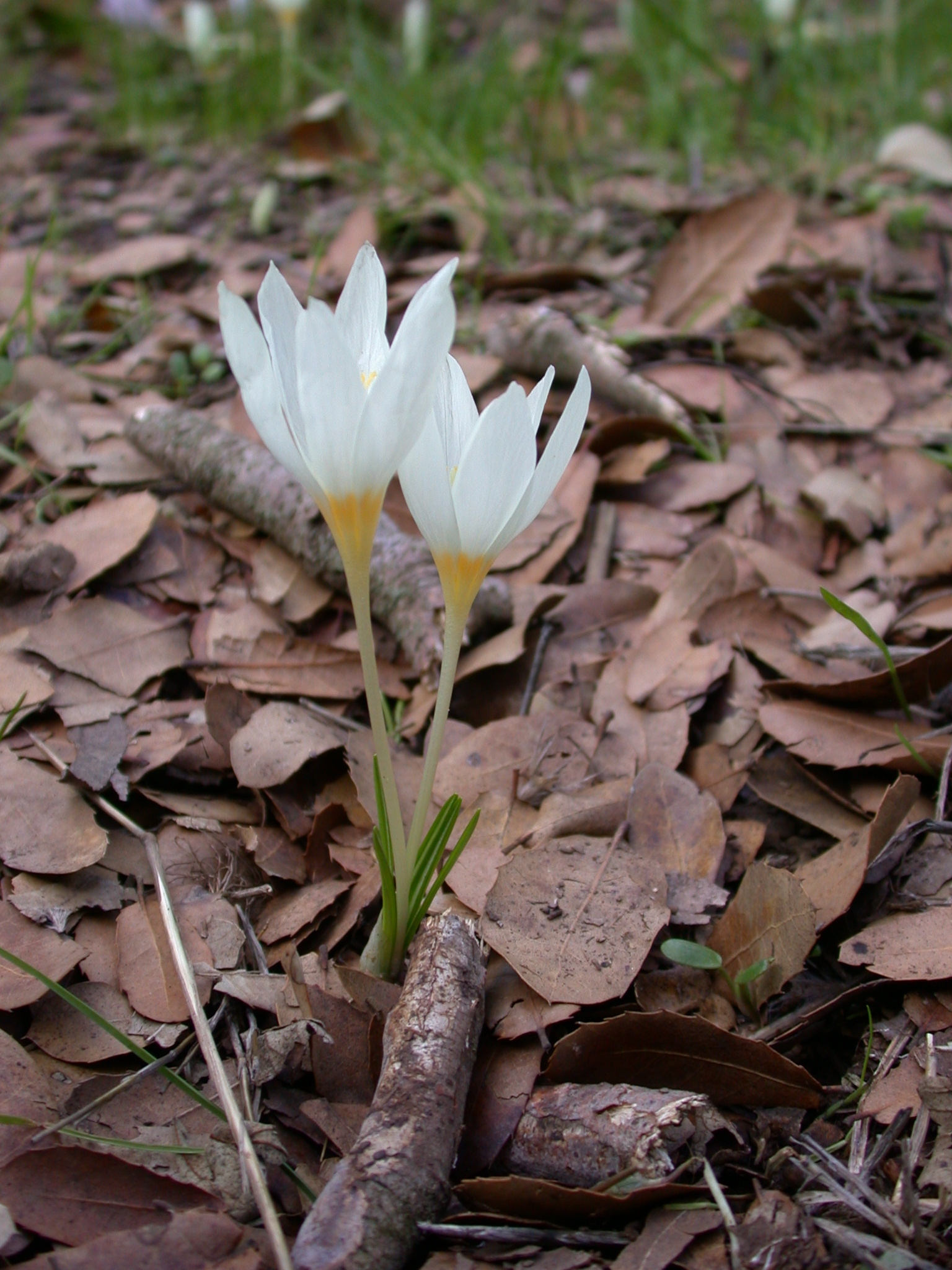

Conservation status
- Least Concern (IUCN 3.1)

Scientific classification
- Kingdom: Plantae
- Clade: Embryophytes
- Clade: Tracheophytes
- Clade: Spermatophytes
- Clade: Angiosperms
- Clade: Monocots
- Order: Asparagales
- Family: Iridaceae
- Genus: Crocus
- Section: Crocus sect. Crocus
- Species: C. ochroleucus

Binomial name
- Crocus ochroleucus Boiss. & Gaill.

= Crocus ochroleucus =

Species of flowering plant

Crocus ochroleucus is species of flowering plant in the Iridaceae family. It is a cream-colored crocus native to Lebanon, Palestine and Syria.

== Description ==
Crocus ochroleucus is a herbaceous perennial geophyte growing from a corm. The corm is small, surrounded with membranous brown tunics. Each corm produces 4–6 leaves, appearing together with flowers, strongly canaliculate, 1.5–2 mm wide. Basal spathe often surrounding numerous scapes. Floral spathe diphyllous, partly enclosing a long tube. Perianth 2–3 cm (0.8–1.2 in); tepals elliptical-ovate, cream-white, yellow and bearded at base. Anthers whitish, longer than filament, with white pollen. Stigmas orange. The style has three branches which are dilated at the apex, with entire or branching ends.

The cream-white color of this crocus is at origin of specific name ochroleucus, which is derived from the Greek ôchros, yellow, and leukos, white. The Latin name Crocus, and the Greek name krokos which gave it birth, were used by ancients to designate the peculiar species with violet flowers: Crocus sativus, whose large stigmas, highly fragrant and of a beautiful orange yellow tint, produce the famous saffron used in coloration of certain food and liquors. The cream-colored Crocus, known in Lebanon as hirsanneen, grows abundantly after autumn first rainfalls. Its corms are sometimes eaten.

Crocus has 3 stamens. This characteristic, among others, allows to differentiate it from meadow saffron which belongs to the Lily family and has 6 stamens.

== Flowering ==
October–December.

== Habitat ==
Rocky places, light soils. On Jebel Jermak in Upper Galilee it grows together with Crocus hyemalis and Crocus pallasii.

== Distribution ==
Lower and middle mountains, South, Hermon.

== Sources ==
- Georges Tohme & Henriette Tohme, Illustrated Flora of Lebanon, National Council For Scientific Research, Second Edition 2014.
