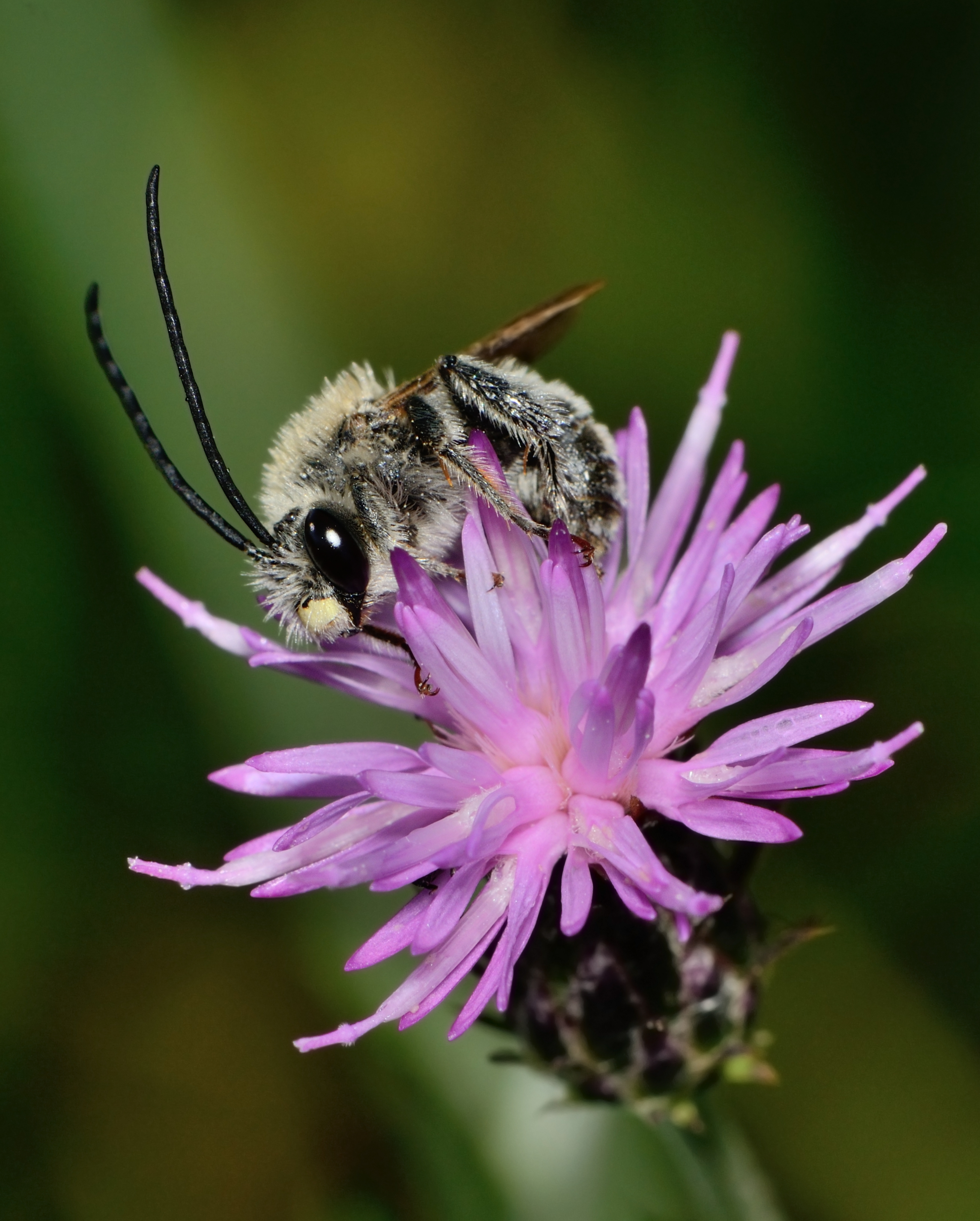
- Eucera cinnamomea male sleeping on a capitulum of Carduus argentatus

Scientific classification
- Domain: Eukaryota
- Kingdom: Animalia
- Phylum: Arthropoda
- Class: Insecta
- Order: Hymenoptera
- Family: Apidae
- Genus: Eucera
- Species: E. cinnamomea

Binomial name
- Eucera cinnamomea Alfken, 1935

= Eucera cinnamomea =

Species of bee

Eucera cinnamomea is a bee in the family Apidae and the subfamily Apinae.
