= Babyloniaca =

Babyloniaca may refer to:

- Babyloniaca, a lost historical work of Berossus
- Babyloniaca, an ancient Greek novel of Iamblichus (novelist)

== See also ==
- Graeco-Babyloniaca
