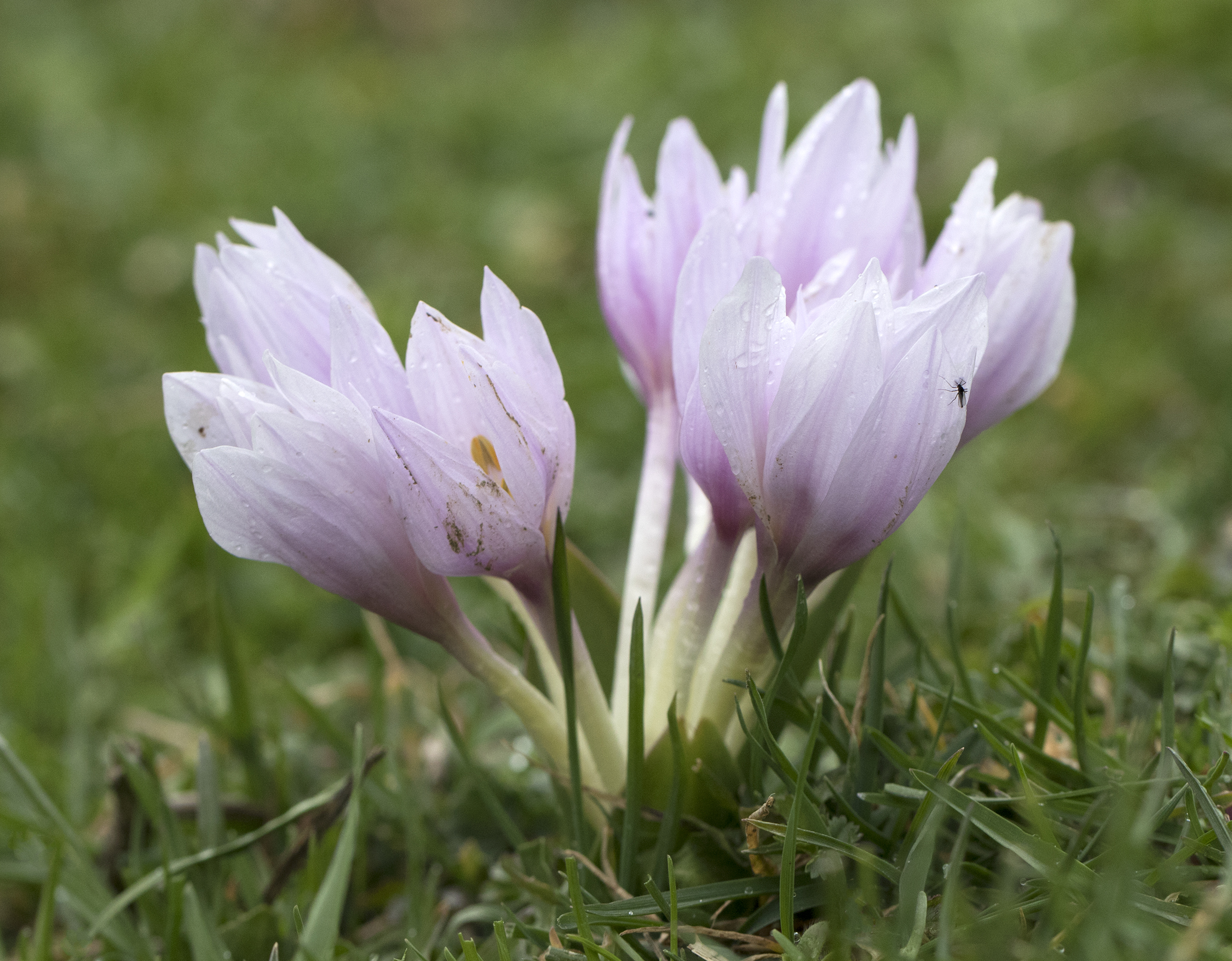

Scientific classification
- Kingdom: Plantae
- Clade: Tracheophytes
- Clade: Angiosperms
- Clade: Monocots
- Order: Liliales
- Family: Colchicaceae
- Genus: Colchicum
- Species: C. szovitsii

Binomial name
- Colchicum szovitsii Fisch. & C.A.Mey.

Subspecies
- See text.

= Colchicum szovitsii =

Species of flowering plant

Colchicum szovitsii is a species of flowering plant in the family Colchicaceae, native from eastern Bulgaria to northwestern Jordan and Iran. It was first described in 1835.

== Subspecies ==
As of January 2022, two subspecies are recognized:

- Colchicum szovitsii subsp. brachyphyllum (Boiss. & Hausskn.) K.Perss. - Lebanon-Syria, Palestine, Turkey
- Colchicum szovitsii subsp. szovitsii – eastern Bulgaria to Iran
