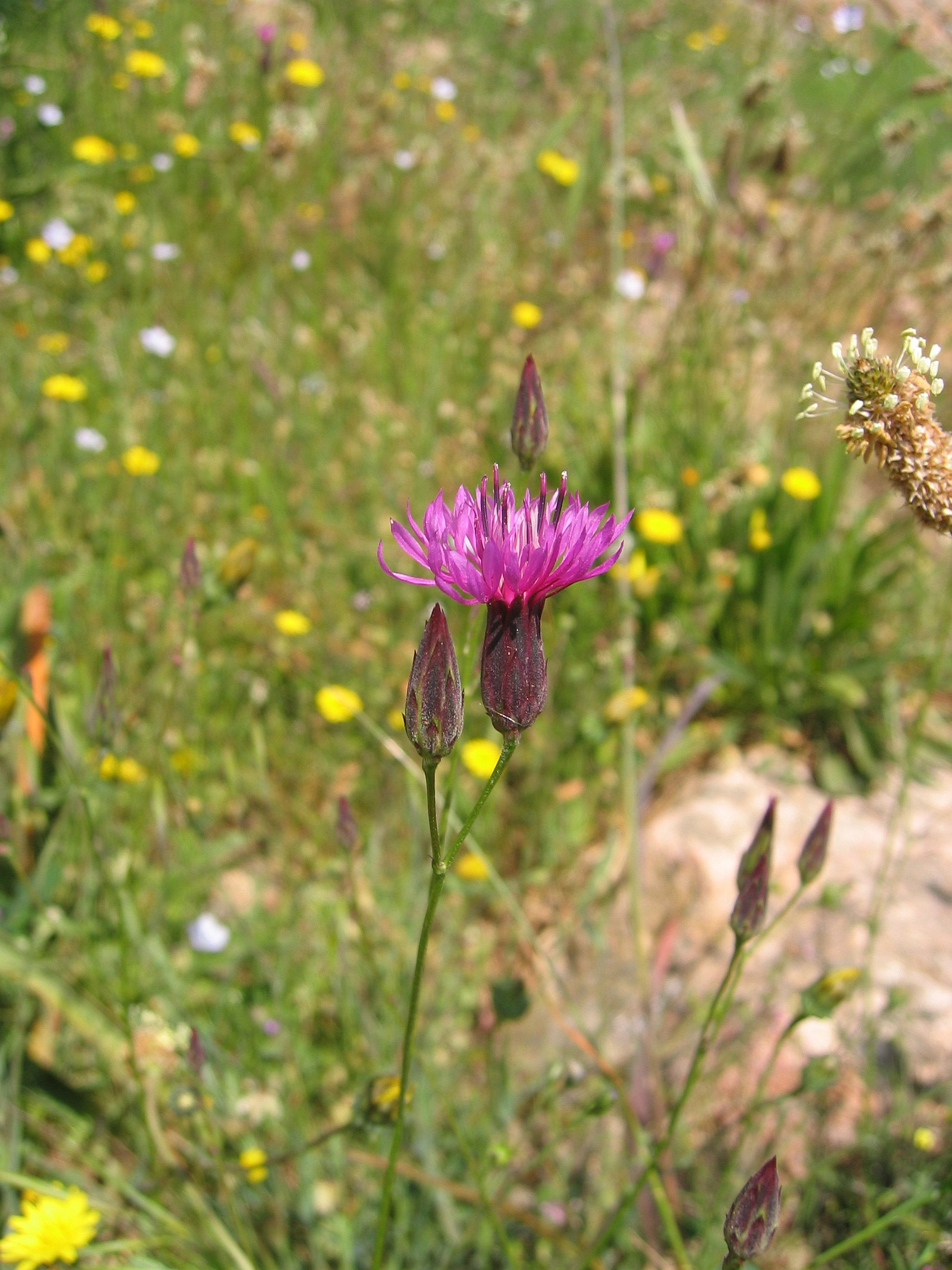
- Crupina crupinastrum

Scientific classification
- Kingdom: Plantae
- Clade: Tracheophytes
- Clade: Angiosperms
- Clade: Eudicots
- Clade: Asterids
- Order: Asterales
- Family: Asteraceae
- Subfamily: Carduoideae
- Tribe: Cardueae
- Subtribe: Centaureinae
- Genus: Crupina (Pers.) DC.

Synonyms
- Centaurea subg. Crupina Pers.; Centaurea sect. Crupina Pers.

= Crupina =

Genus of flowering plants

Crupina is a small genus of plants in the tribe Cardueae within the family Asteraceae.

The common crupina Crupina vulgaris is a notorious noxious weed on several continents. The other species, Crupina crupinastrum, also has the potential to become weedy, but it is not as bad a pest at the current time. These are thistle-like plants with bright deep pink flower heads.

Species

- Crupina crupinastrum (Moris) Vis. - southern Europe, northern Africa, southwestern Asia
- Crupina intermedia (Mutel) Walp. - North Africa, Iran, Iraq, Turkey, Armenia
- Crupina pseudocrupina (Mutel) Walp. - Greece
- Crupina strum (Moris) Vis. - Croatia
- Crupina vulgaris Pers. ex Cass. - native to Europe, North Africa, and Asia as far east as Xinjiang; naturalized in China, North America, Australia, etc., and considered a noxious weed in some places
