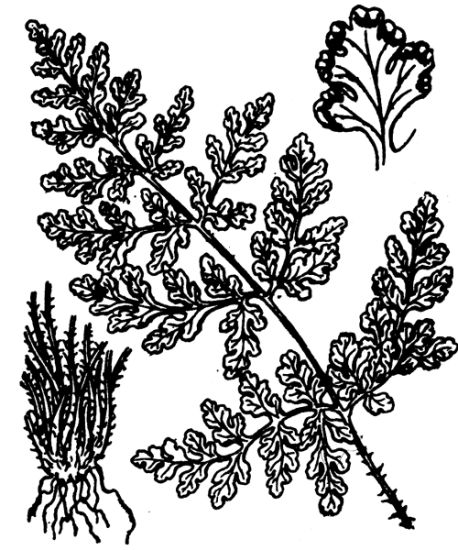

Scientific classification
- Kingdom: Plantae
- Clade: Tracheophytes
- Division: Polypodiophyta
- Class: Polypodiopsida
- Order: Polypodiales
- Family: Pteridaceae
- Genus: Cheilanthes
- Species: C. acrostica

Binomial name
- Cheilanthes acrostica (Balb.) Tod.

= Cheilanthes acrostica =

Species of fern

Cheilanthes acrostica is a species of lip fern

== Description ==
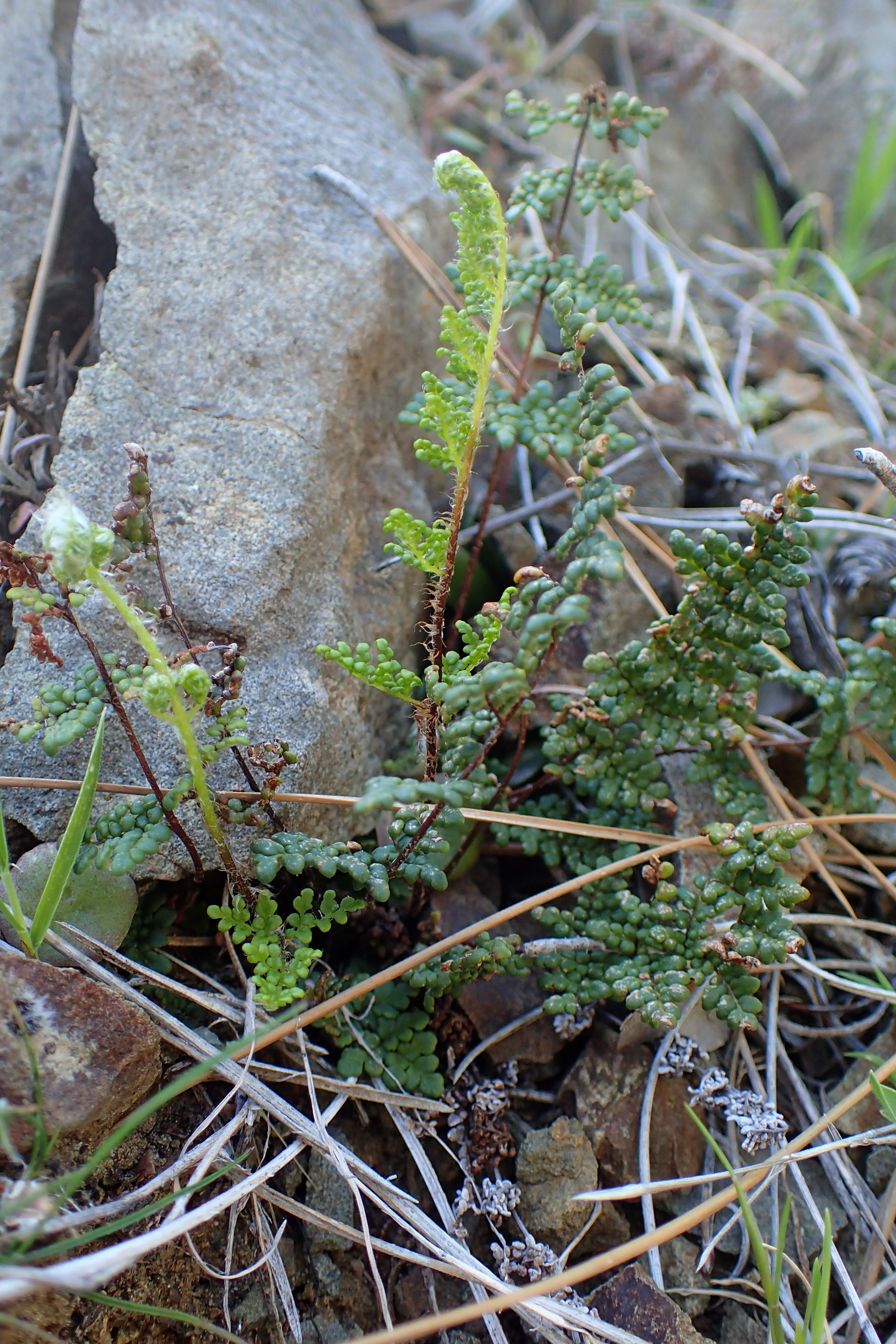
Cheilanthes acrostica in Cyprus

The fronds are arranged in groups.

== Habitat ==
Cheilanthes acrostica is found in Mediterranean areas including Iberia. The season is from February to June. Its conservation status is of concern. It grows in limestone fissures, but it is also found in quartzites and sandstones and among other loose rocks. It is found at a height of 300 to 900 m.

== Basis ==
This plant was first described in 1866.
