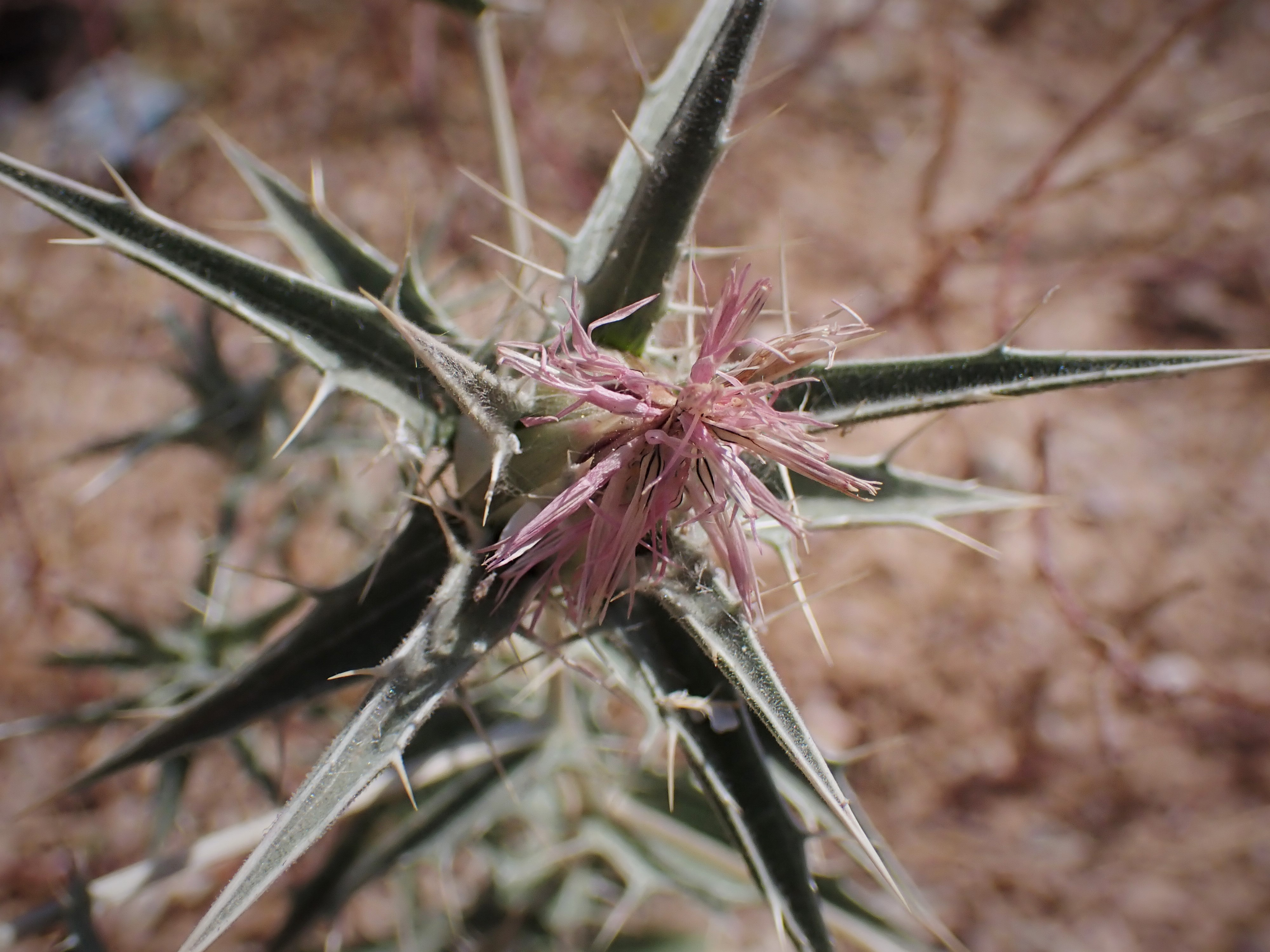
- In Jordan

Scientific classification
- Kingdom: Plantae
- Clade: Tracheophytes
- Clade: Angiosperms
- Clade: Eudicots
- Clade: Asterids
- Order: Asterales
- Family: Asteraceae
- Genus: Carthamus
- Species: C. glaucus

Binomial name
- Carthamus glaucus M.Bieb.

Subspecies
- Carthamus glaucus subsp. glandulosus; Carthamus glaucus subsp. glaucus

= Carthamus glaucus =

Species of flowering plant

Carthamus glaucus, the glaucous star thistle, is a species of plant in the family Asteraceae. It is found in Israel, Lebanon and Egypt. It is also reported as an invasive species in Victoria, Australia.

It is parasitized by Cuscuta babylonica.

== See also ==
- Flora of Lebanon
