= Graeco-Babyloniaca =

Clay tablet inscriptions

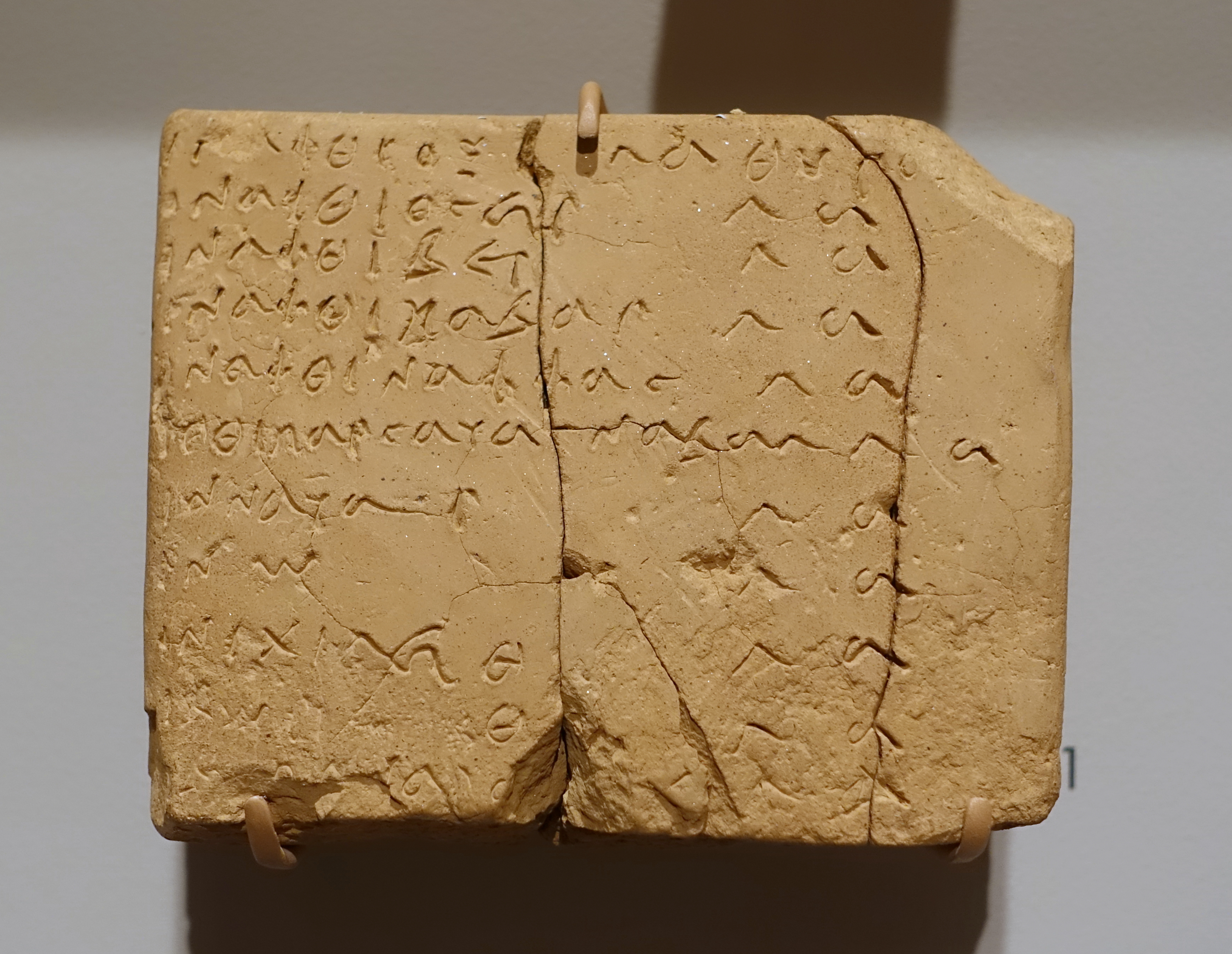
Bilingual tablet, Graeco-Babyloniaca, c. 50 BC to 50 AC (Harvard Semitic Museum)

The Graeco-Babyloniaca (singular: Graeco-Babyloniacum) are clay tablets written in the Sumerian or Akkadian languages using cuneiform on one side with transliterations in the Greek alphabet on the other.

Quoting Edmond Sollberger:

They are obviously school texts written by some Greek student, or students, of Sumerian or Akkadian some time during the late second or early first centuries B.C.

As worded by M. J. Geller, they indicate that both Babylonian languages "written in cuneiform characters were still legible in the Seleucid and Parthian periods in Mesopotamia".
