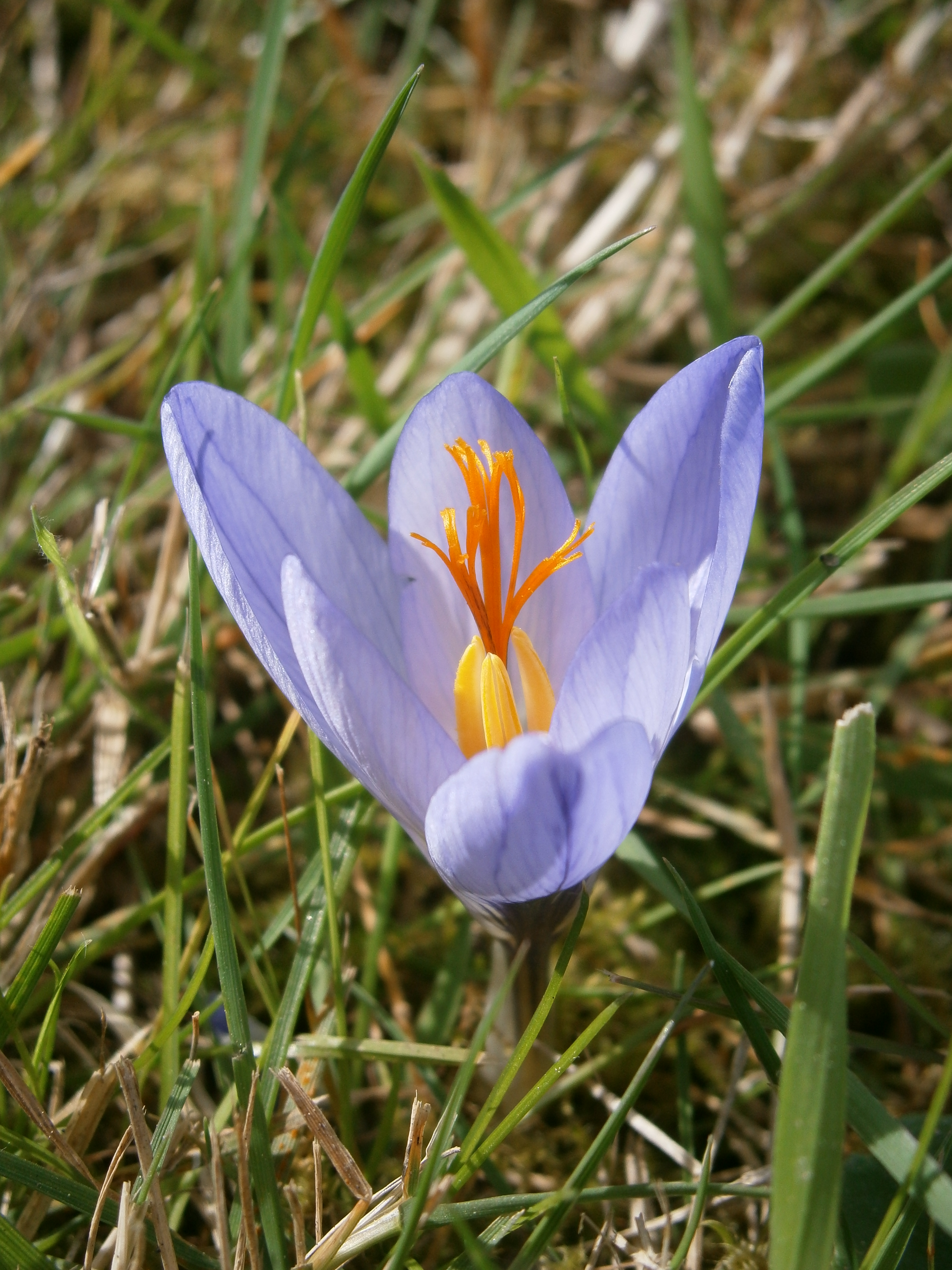

Scientific classification
- Kingdom: Plantae
- Clade: Tracheophytes
- Clade: Angiosperms
- Clade: Monocots
- Order: Asparagales
- Family: Iridaceae
- Genus: Crocus
- Species: C. cancellatus

Binomial name
- Crocus cancellatus Herb.

Synonyms
- Crocus cancellatus var. cilicius Maw; Crocus cancellatus var. kotschyanus Herb.; Crocus cancellatus var. margaritaceus Herb.; Crocus cancellatus var. naupliensis Herb.; Crocus cilicius Kotschy ex Baker; Crocus pylarum J.Gay ex Tchich.

= Crocus cancellatus =

Species of flowering plant

Crocus cancellatus is a species of flowering plant in the family (biology Iridaceae. It is found from the Balkan Peninsula to Iran.

Crocus cancellatus is a corm growing to 0.1 by 0.1 m (3.9 in by 3.9 in). It is hardy to zone (UK) 5 and is not frost tender. It is in flower from September to November, and the seeds ripen from March to May.
