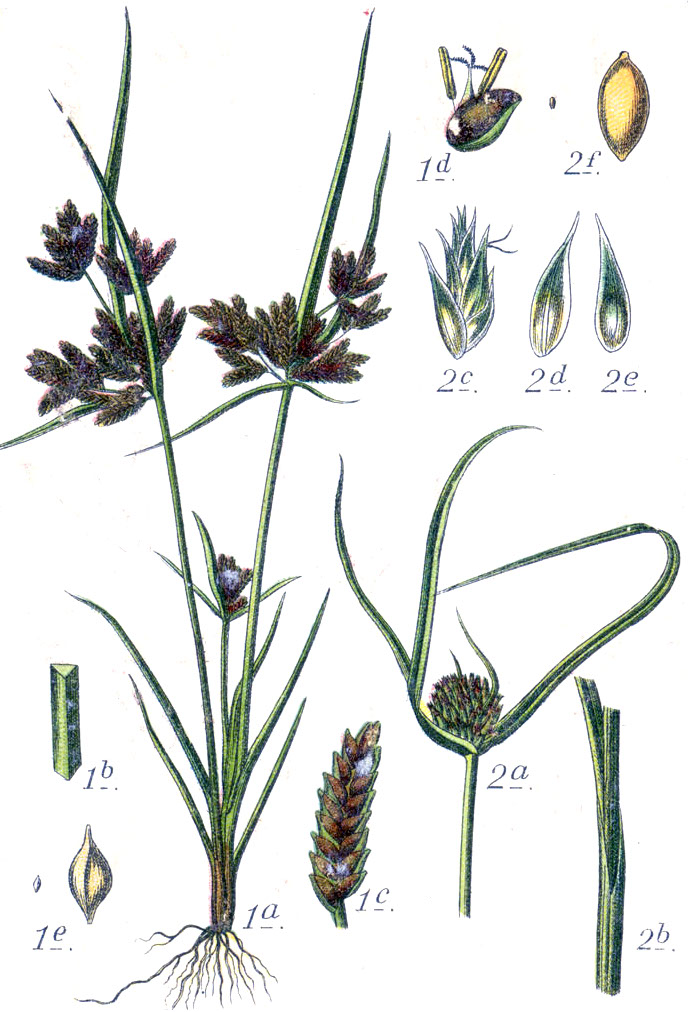

Scientific classification
- Kingdom: Plantae
- Clade: Tracheophytes
- Clade: Angiosperms
- Clade: Monocots
- Clade: Commelinids
- Order: Poales
- Family: Cyperaceae
- Genus: Cyperus
- Species: C. michelianus

Binomial name
- Cyperus michelianus (L.) Delile, 1813

= Cyperus michelianus =

Species of sedge

Cyperus michelianus is a species of sedge that is native to parts of Europe, Asia, Africa and Australia. It grows in wet habitats such as river margins and paddy fields.

== See also ==
- List of Cyperus species
