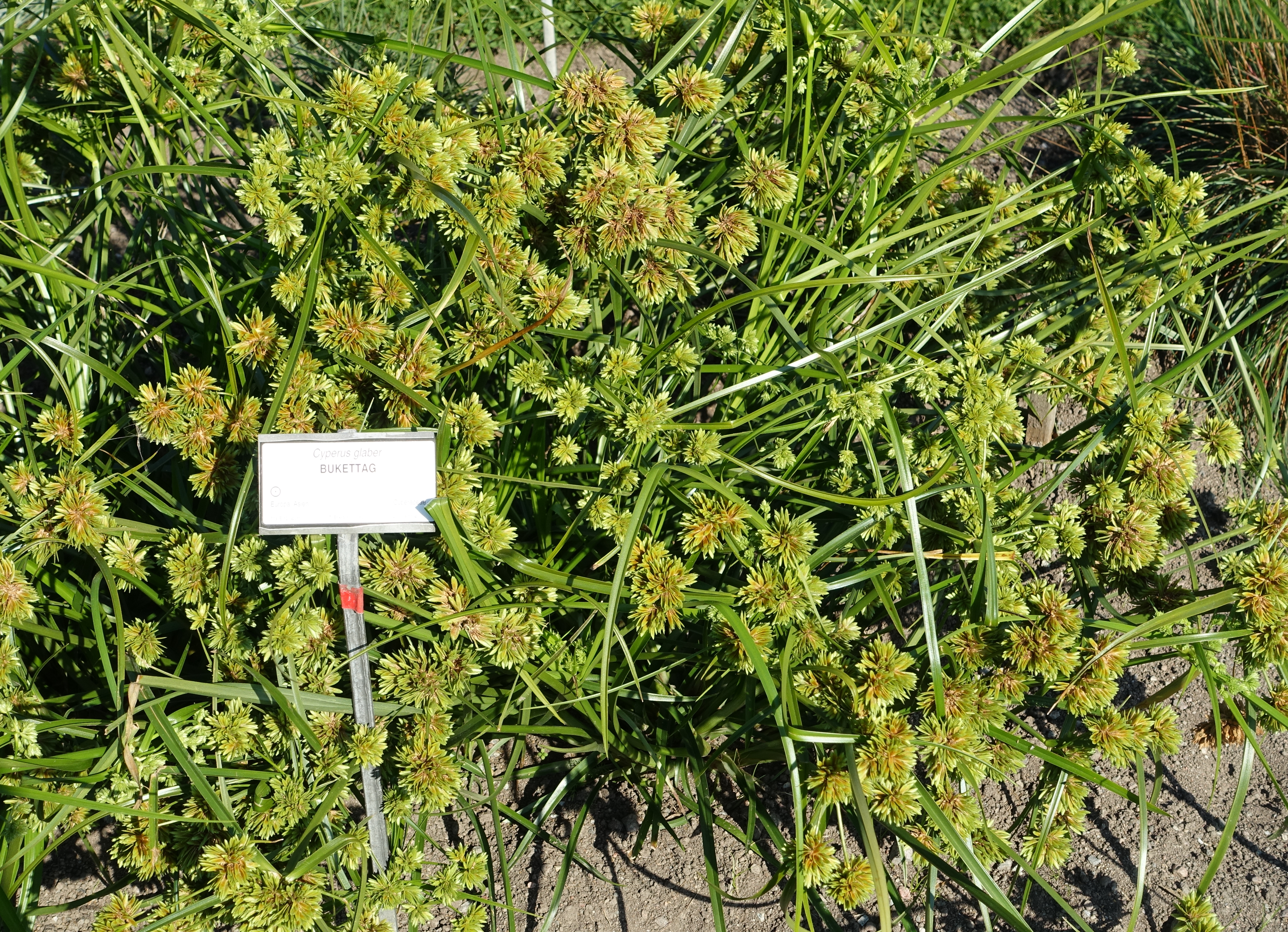

Scientific classification
- Kingdom: Plantae
- Clade: Tracheophytes
- Clade: Angiosperms
- Clade: Monocots
- Clade: Commelinids
- Order: Poales
- Family: Cyperaceae
- Genus: Cyperus
- Species: C. glaber

Binomial name
- Cyperus glaber L., 1771

= Cyperus glaber =

Species of sedge

Cyperus glaber is a species of sedge that is native to parts of central and eastern Europe, the Middle East and western Asia.

== See also ==
- List of Cyperus species
