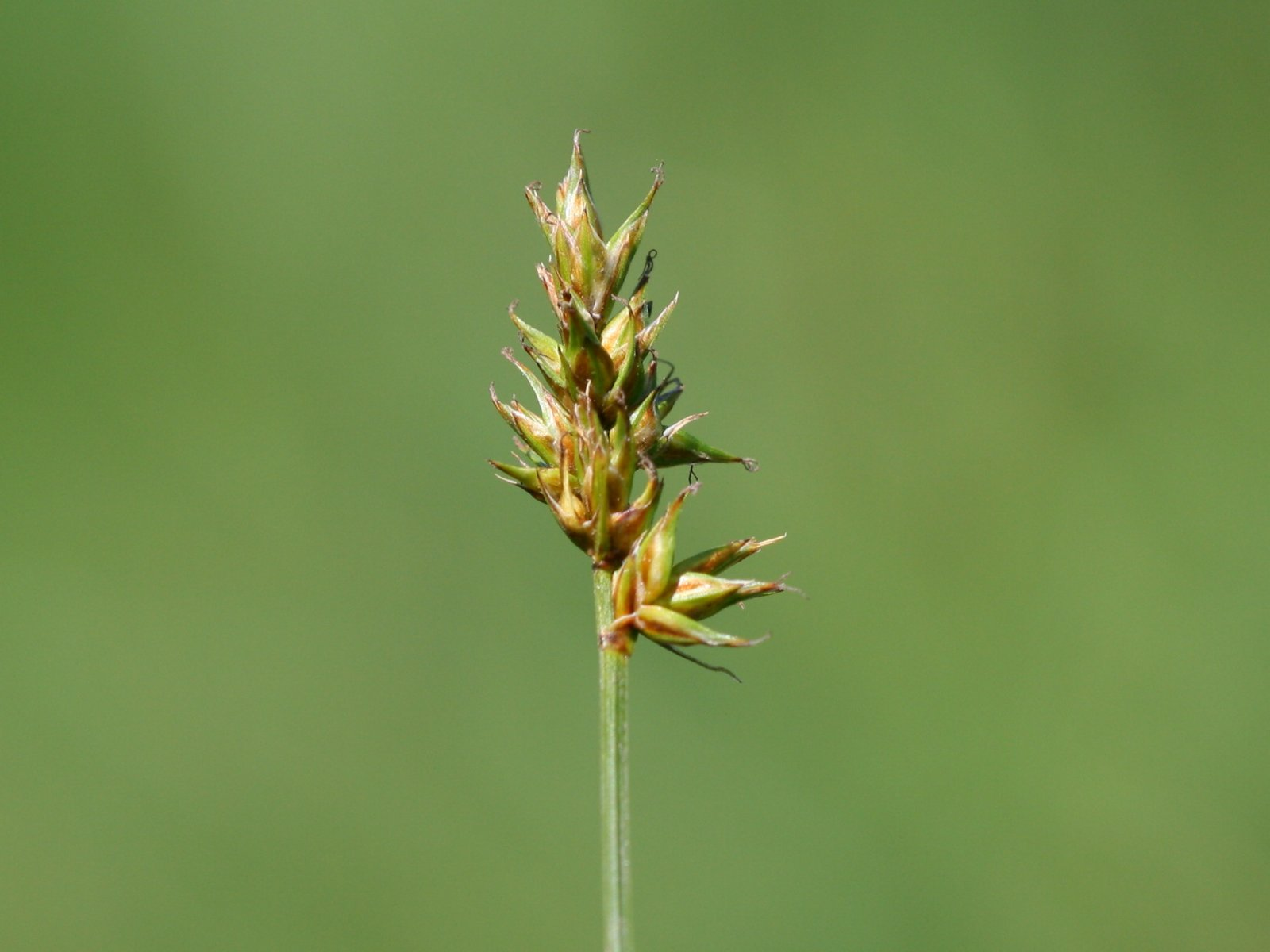

Scientific classification
- Kingdom: Plantae
- Clade: Embryophytes
- Clade: Tracheophytes
- Clade: Angiosperms
- Clade: Monocots
- Clade: Commelinids
- Order: Poales
- Family: Cyperaceae
- Genus: Carex
- Species: C. pairae

Binomial name
- Carex pairae F.W.Schultz

Synonyms
- Carex bullockiana Nelmes

= Carex pairae =

Species of plant

Carex pairae is a species of perennial grass in the family Cyperaceae (sedges). They have a self-supporting growth form and simple, broad leaves. Individuals can grow to 0.21 m tall. The species is native to Europe, North Africa and Turkey.

== Sources ==
This article incorporates text from a free content work. Licensed under CC0 (license statement/permission). Text taken from Carex pairae. Encyclopedia of Life.
