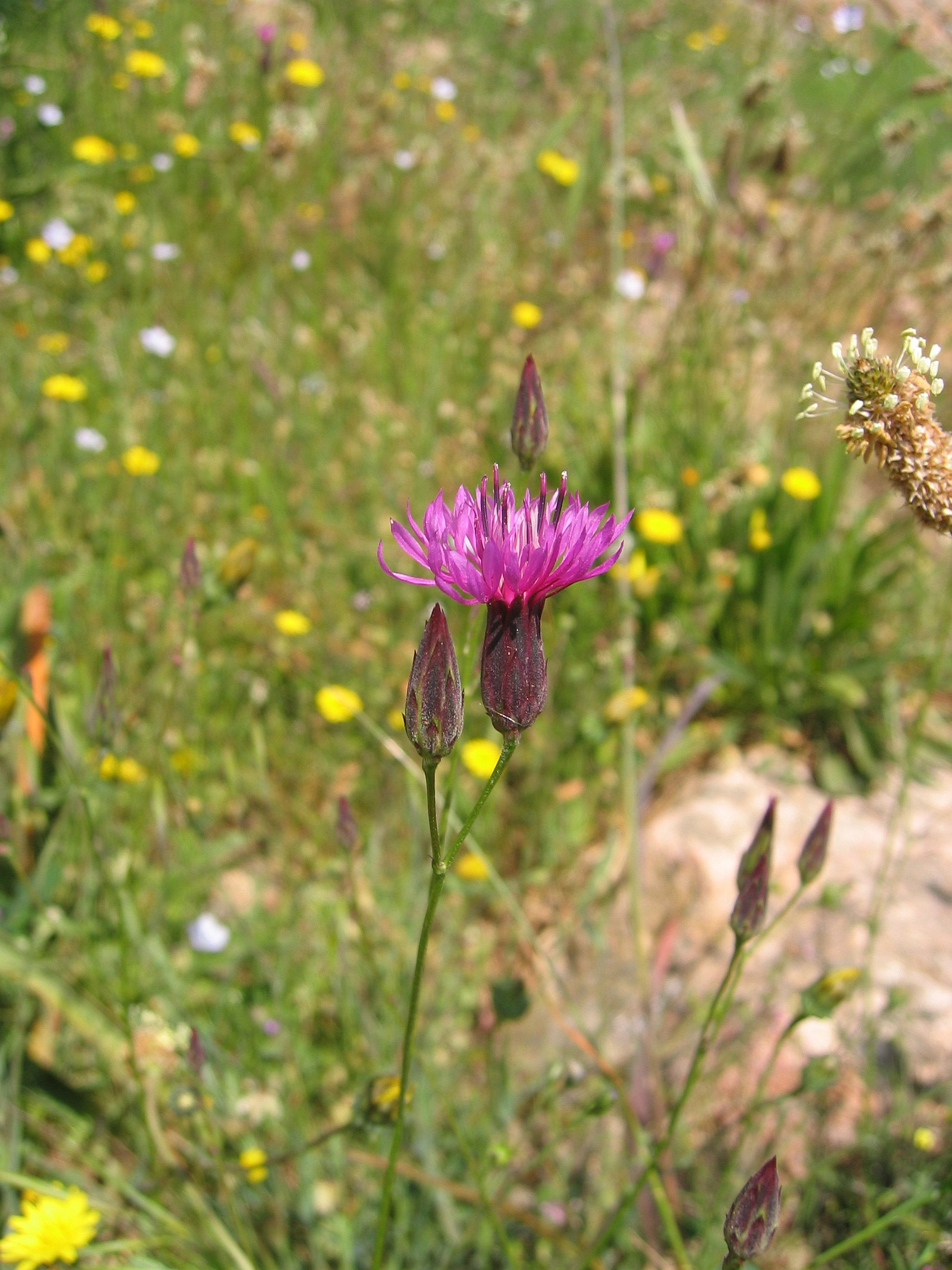

Scientific classification
- Kingdom: Plantae
- Clade: Embryophytes
- Clade: Tracheophytes
- Clade: Angiosperms
- Clade: Eudicots
- Clade: Asterids
- Order: Asterales
- Family: Asteraceae
- Genus: Crupina
- Species: C. crupinastrum

Binomial name
- Crupina crupinastrum (Moris) Vis.

Synonyms
- Centaurea crupina Sm.; Centaurea crupinastrum Moris; Crupina crupinastrum var. matae (P.Palau) Font Quer ex O.Bolòs & Vigo; Crupina matae P.Palau; Crupina morisii Boreau; Crupina zuccarinii Bunge ex Nyman

= Crupina crupinastrum =

Species of plant

Crupina crupinastrum, also known as false saw wort, is a species of annual herb in the family Asteraceae. They have a self-supporting growth form and simple, broad leaves. Flowers are visited by scarce swallowtail, Hoplitis, Trichodes, and brimstone. Individuals can grow to 40 cm.

== Sources ==
This article incorporates text from a free content work. Licensed under CC0 (license statement/permission). Text taken from Crupina crupinastrum. Encyclopedia of Life.
