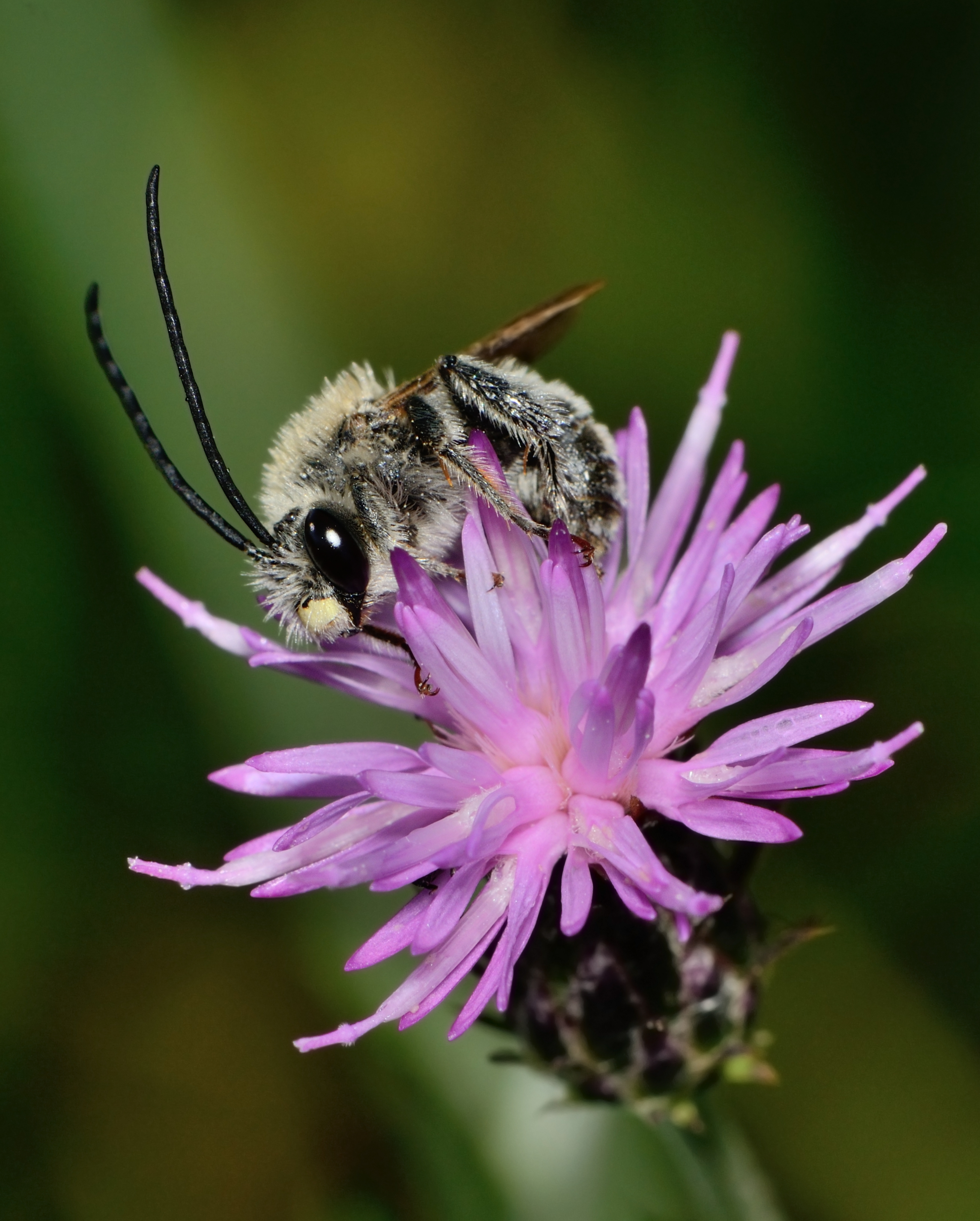
- Eucera cinnamomea male on a capitulum of Carduus argentatus

Scientific classification
- Kingdom: Plantae
- Clade: Tracheophytes
- Clade: Angiosperms
- Clade: Eudicots
- Clade: Asterids
- Order: Asterales
- Family: Asteraceae
- Genus: Carduus
- Species: C. argentatus

Binomial name
- Carduus argentatus L.

Synonyms
- Carduus acicularis Bertoloni

= Carduus argentatus =

Silver thistle

Species of flowering plant in the daisy family

Carduus argentatus, sometimes known as the silver thistle, is an annual herb in the family Asteraceae. As a member of the genus Carduus it is known as a plumeless thistle. It is found throughout the Mediterranean and Middle East. Frequently growing in disturbed habitats, it is often found in sandy and stony desert wadis. It is found in the eastern deserts of Egypt, through the East Mediterranean region and into Iraq, Pakistan and Afghanistan. It can be found growing in open woodlands and shrublands, on steppes and semi-steppes as well as in extreme desert conditions. It grows among mountain vegetation on Mount Hermon in the Golan Heights. In Crete it is found at altitudes of up to 1,400 metres (4,600 ft).

== Taxonomy and etymology ==
The plant was originally described by Carl Linnaeus on page 280 of the Mantissa Plantarum Altera, October 1771. The genus name Carduus is from the Latin for "a kind of thistle" or "thistlelike plant". It is related to the medieval Latin word Cardonnacum ("a place of chardons or thistles"), which is the origin of Chardonnay, the name of the grape variety. Argentatus is Latin for silver.

== Description ==
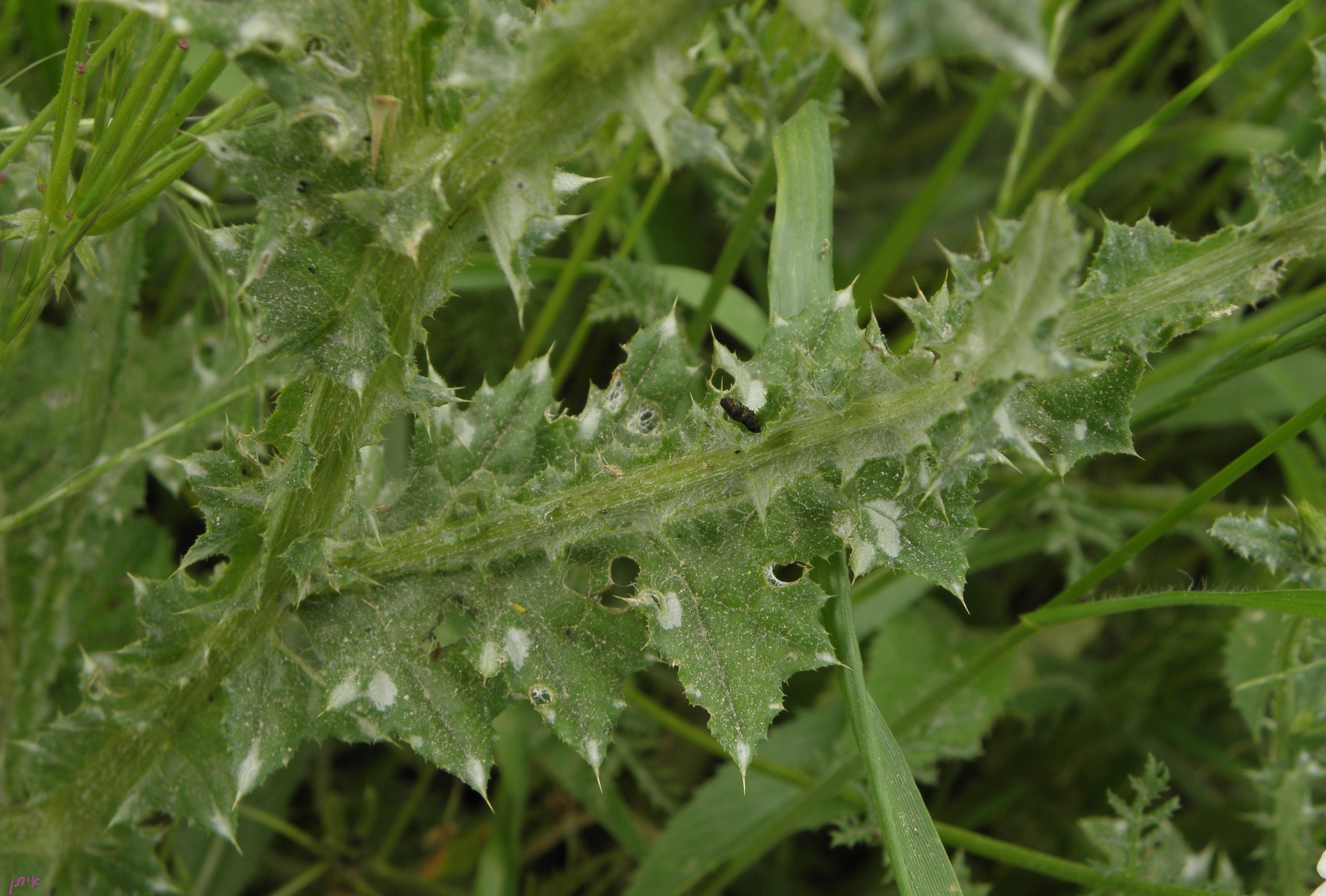
Carduus argentatus, leaf with white spots

The plant grows to a height of about 30 centimetres (12 in) and has erect stems with spiny wings. They may be simple or have many branches. The leaves are spiny with toothed or serrated margins, those at the base forming a rosette and the stem leaves being alternate. The flower stem is tomentose and the pink to lavender flowers are single and bloom in April and May. They have spiny bracts and ovate sepals which are mucronate but not spiny. They are followed by fruits known as cypselae which are ovoid and slightly flattened. The calyx persists as pappus or may fall off in rings.

John Wilkes's Encyclopaedia Londinensis (volume III, 1810) makes note of the "remarkable" features of the plant including the leaves' spots of white (pictured), which it reports are found in three other species of "Egyptian thistle".

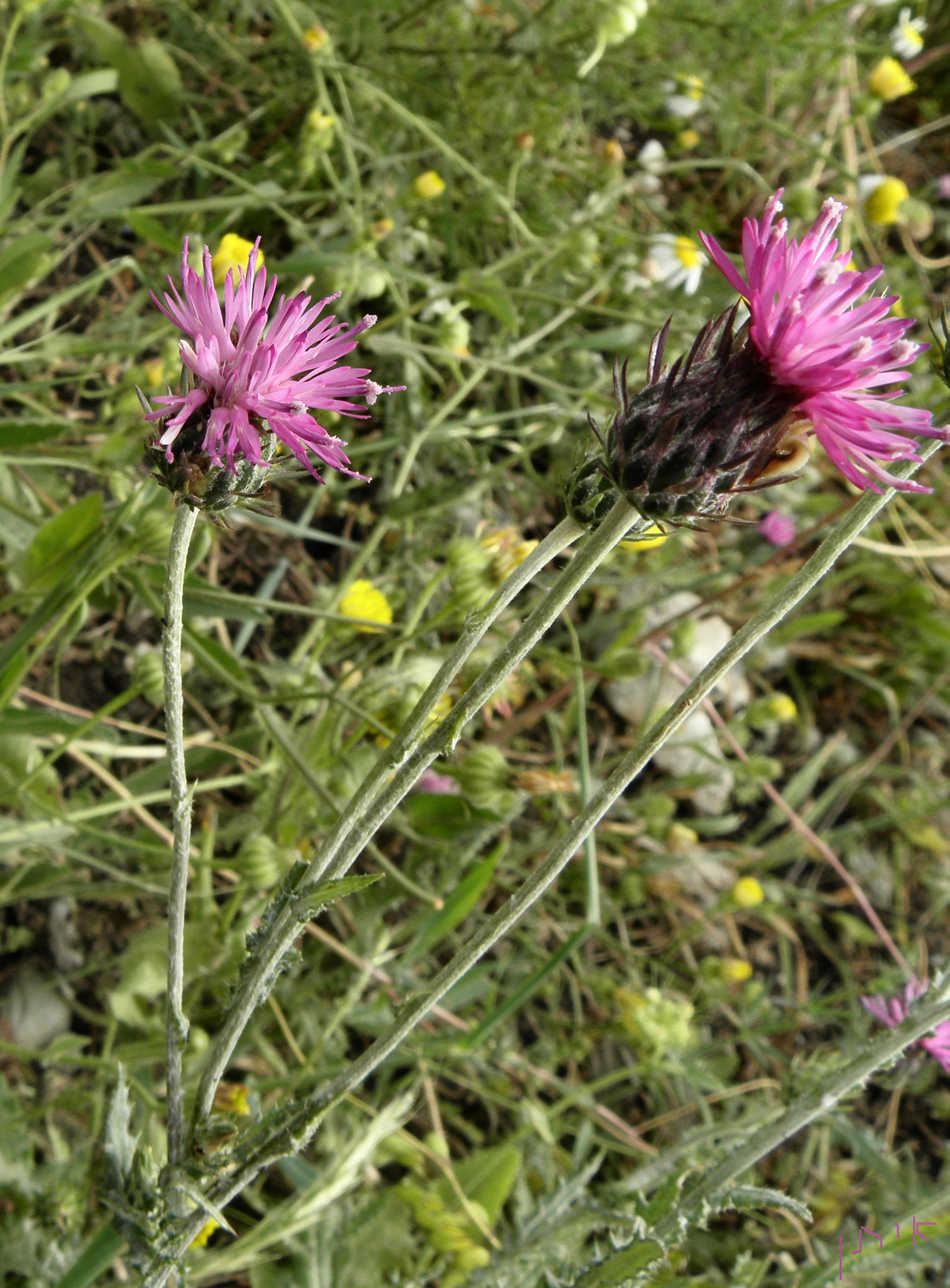
Carduus argentatus inflorescences
