= Cyperus jeminicus =

Scientific classification
- Kingdom: Plantae
- Clade: Tracheophytes
- Clade: Angiosperms
- Clade: Monocots
- Clade: Commelinids
- Order: Poales
- Family: Cyperaceae
- Genus: Cyperus
- Species: C. jeminicus

Binomial name
- Cyperus jeminicus Rottb.

Species of sedge

Cyperus jeminicus is a species of sedge that is native to parts of Africa, the Middle East and India.

The species was first formally described by the botanist Christen Friis Rottbøll in 1773.

== See also ==
- List of Cyperus species
