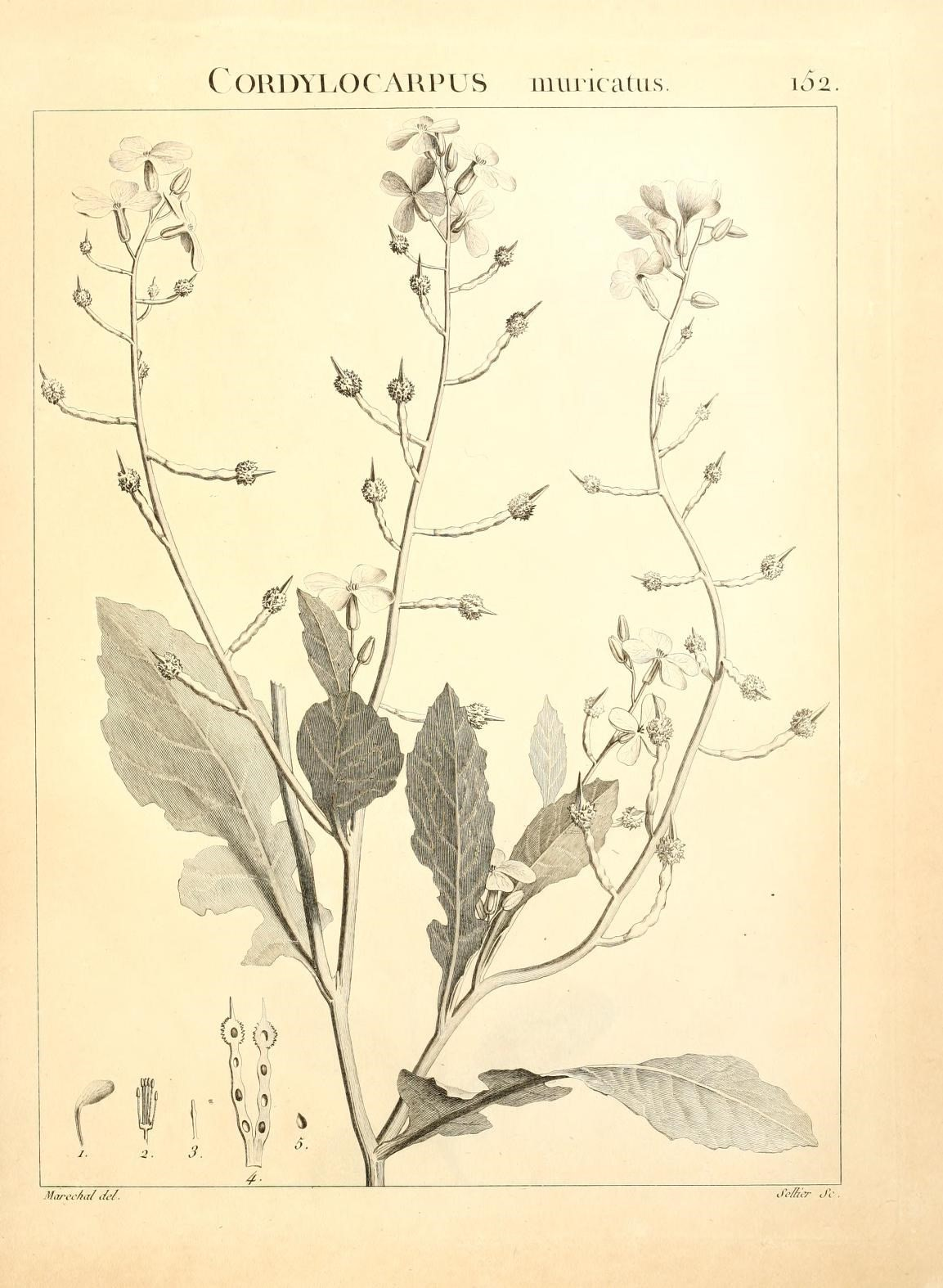
- Cordylocarpus muricatus

Scientific classification
- Kingdom: Plantae
- Clade: Tracheophytes
- Clade: Angiosperms
- Clade: Eudicots
- Clade: Rosids
- Order: Brassicales
- Family: Brassicaceae
- Genus: Cordylocarpus; Desf.
- Species: C. muricatus

Binomial name
- Cordylocarpus muricatus Desf.

Synonyms
- Cordylocarpus muricatus var. leiocarpus Maire; Cordylocarpus muricatus subvar. trichocarpus Faure & Maire; Cordylocarpus muricatus var. trichocarpus (Faure & Maire) Maire

= Cordylocarpus =

Genus of flowering plants

Cordylocarpus is a genus of flowering plants belonging to the family Brassicaceae. It includes a single species, Cordylocarpus muricatus, which is native to Algeria and Morocco.
