= Cyperus sharonensis =

Scientific classification
- Kingdom: Plantae
- Clade: Tracheophytes
- Clade: Angiosperms
- Clade: Monocots
- Clade: Commelinids
- Order: Poales
- Family: Cyperaceae
- Genus: Cyperus
- Species: C. sharonensis

Binomial name
- Cyperus sharonensis Danin & Kukkonen, 1995

Species of sedge

Cyperus sharonensis is a species of sedge that is native to western parts of the Israel.

== See also ==
- List of Cyperus species
