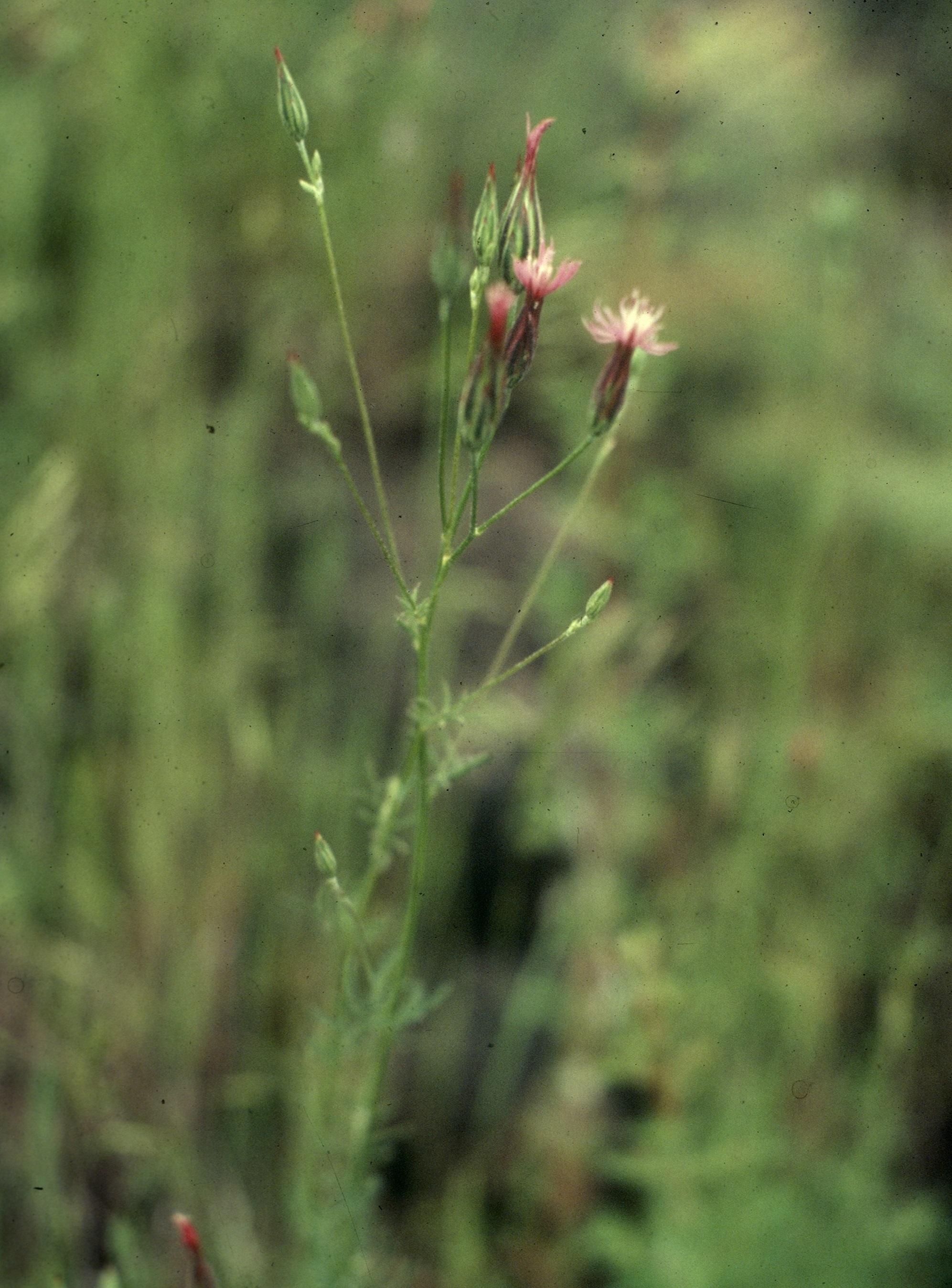

Scientific classification
- Kingdom: Plantae
- Clade: Embryophytes
- Clade: Tracheophytes
- Clade: Spermatophytes
- Clade: Angiosperms
- Clade: Eudicots
- Clade: Asterids
- Order: Asterales
- Family: Asteraceae
- Genus: Crupina
- Species: C. vulgaris

Binomial name
- Crupina vulgaris Pers. ex. Cass.

Synonyms
- Synonymy: Centaurea acuta Lam.; Centaurea crupina L.; Centaurea tenuifolia Salisb.; Crupina acuta (Lam.) Fritsch ex Janch.; Crupina alpestris Arv.-Touv.; Crupina brachypappa Jord. & Fourr.; Crupina oligantha Tschern.; Crupina pauciflora Hoffmanns. & Link; Cyanus lanceolatus Moench; Serratula crupina (L.) Vill.

= Crupina vulgaris =

Species of flowering plant

Crupina vulgaris is a species of flowering plant in the family Asteraceae. Its common names include common crupina, bearded-creeper, false saw-wort, and starry scabious. It is native to parts of Europe, Asia, and North Africa, and it is known elsewhere as an introduced species and often a noxious weed.

This winter annual herb produces a slender stem reaching about 120 cm (4 feet) in height. The ridged stem has many branches, and is leafy below. The basal leaves are entire, toothed, or divided, and have rough-haired surfaces and bristly edges. They generally wither by flowering. Leaves higher on the stem are up to 3.5 centimeters long and are divided into narrow lobes with bristly edges. The slender flower head is about 1 or 2 centimeters long. It contains up to 5 florets, usually only one of which is fertile. It has a purple corolla. It yields one large fruit, a cypsela up to 1.6 centimeters long including its barrel-shaped body and its long, spreading pappus of brown or black bristles. It can weigh up to 36 milligrams. One average plant produces about 130 fruits.

The flower heads often fall off the plant after the seeds ripen, each containing one fruit, or occasionally two in heads that produced two fertile florets. The seeds fall out and are dispersed by the wind or on the feet of livestock; they can be dispersed greater distances when floating on water or when transported by rodents, birds, or humans, including on machinery and in contaminated shipments of hay or grain. The seeds can pass unscathed through the guts of most animals, except sheep. The cotyledons of the seedling have a bright purple red, or purplish red midvein and margins.

The plant can grow in a range of temperatures, moisture levels, and soil types, and in many types of habitat, including fields, pastures, grasslands, roadsides, railroads, and dump sites. It is not invasive in its native range, but in regions where it has naturalized, such as the rangelands of the western United States, it can negatively affect native flora through competition, reduce the quality of forage, and increase soil erosion. The plant can form wide stands in fields. It is unpalatable to most grazing animals, which avoid it and selectively consume other grasses and herbs, allowing the weed to survive and spread. Sheep and goats will consume the plant, but are not effective agents of eradication.

A number of natural enemies have been recorded, such as the mite Aceria balasi, which attacks the inflorescence, the moths Clytie illunaris, Metzneria aprilella, and Ornativalva plutelliformis, which feed on the seeds, and the weevil Styphlus penicillus, which feeds on the leaves. Ramularia crupinae, first described from the plant, is a pathogenic sac fungus that grows on its leaves. No agents of biological pest control have been established.
