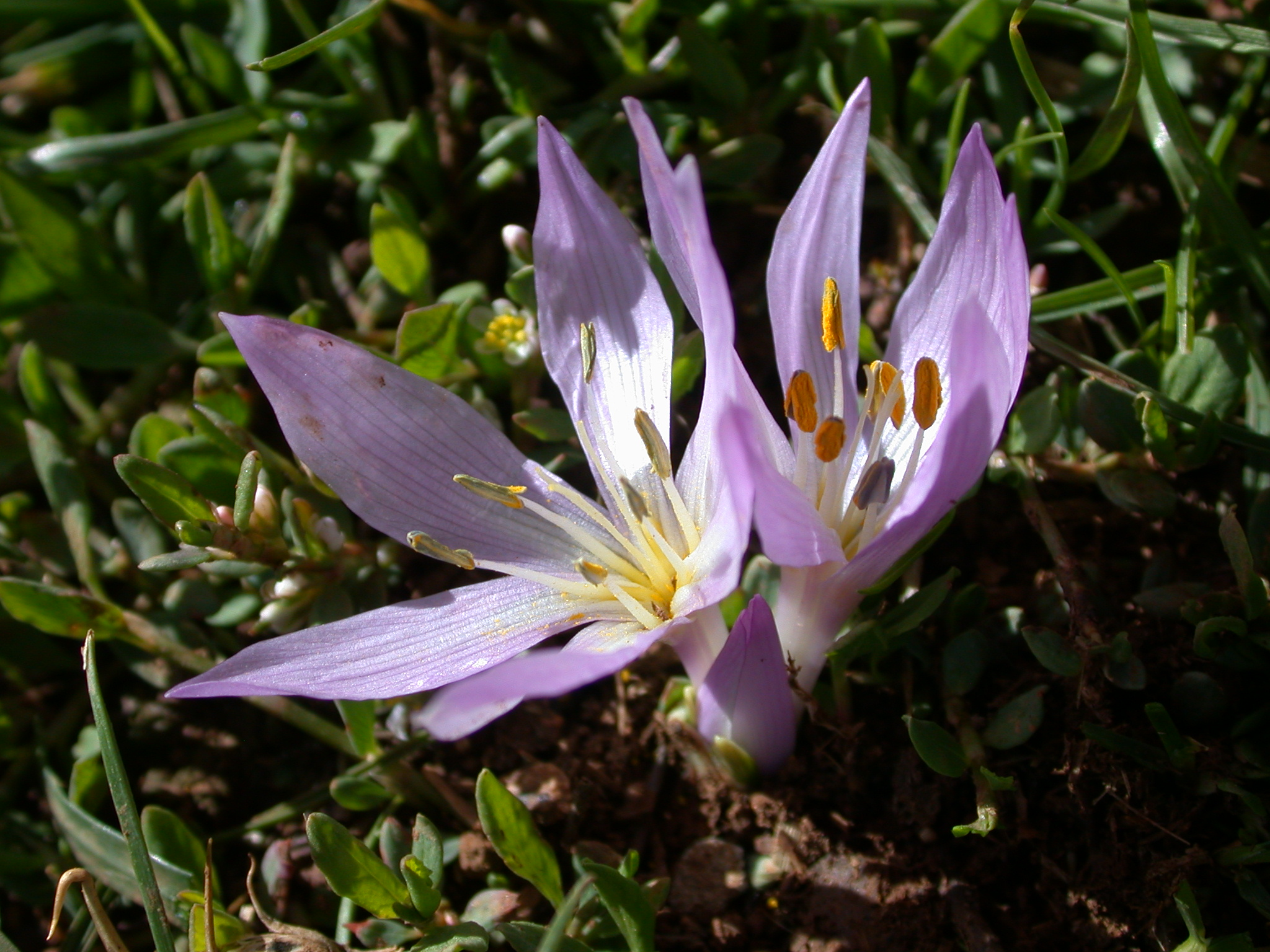

Scientific classification
- Kingdom: Plantae
- Clade: Tracheophytes
- Clade: Angiosperms
- Clade: Monocots
- Order: Liliales
- Family: Colchicaceae
- Genus: Colchicum
- Species: C. szovitsii
- Subspecies: C. s. subsp. brachyphyllum

Trinomial name
- Colchicum szovitsii subsp. brachyphyllum (Boiss. & Hausskn.) K.Perss.

Synonyms
- Colchicum brachyphyllum Boiss. & Hausskn.; Colchicum hydrophilum Siehe; Colchicum libanoticum Ehrenb. ex Boiss.

= Colchicum szovitsii subsp. brachyphyllum =

Species of flowering plant

Colchicum szovitsii subsp. brachyphyllum, synonym Colchicum brachyphyllum, is a subspecies of Colchicum szovitsii.

== Nomenclature ==
The subspecies name hrachyphyllum is formed from the Greek brakhus, short, and phullon leaf.

== Characteristics ==
It is a perennial. Its corm is oval and 1–2 cm long. Its leaves are short at flowering time, eventually reaching 12 cm long over 2.5–3 cm wide, slightly undulate. Its flowers are numerous, white, pinkish white, or regular pink; tube rather thick. Its tepals are elliptico-lanceolate, lengthily tapered at base, more briefly at the apex, 2–3 cm long, 3–6 mm wide. Its stamens have brown anthers and filaments thickened at the base.

== Seasonality ==
The plant flowers from January to June.

== Range and habitat ==
The plant grows in Syria, Lebanon, and Turkey. It grows abundantly near the melting snow of the middle and upper mountains of the Beqaa Valley.
