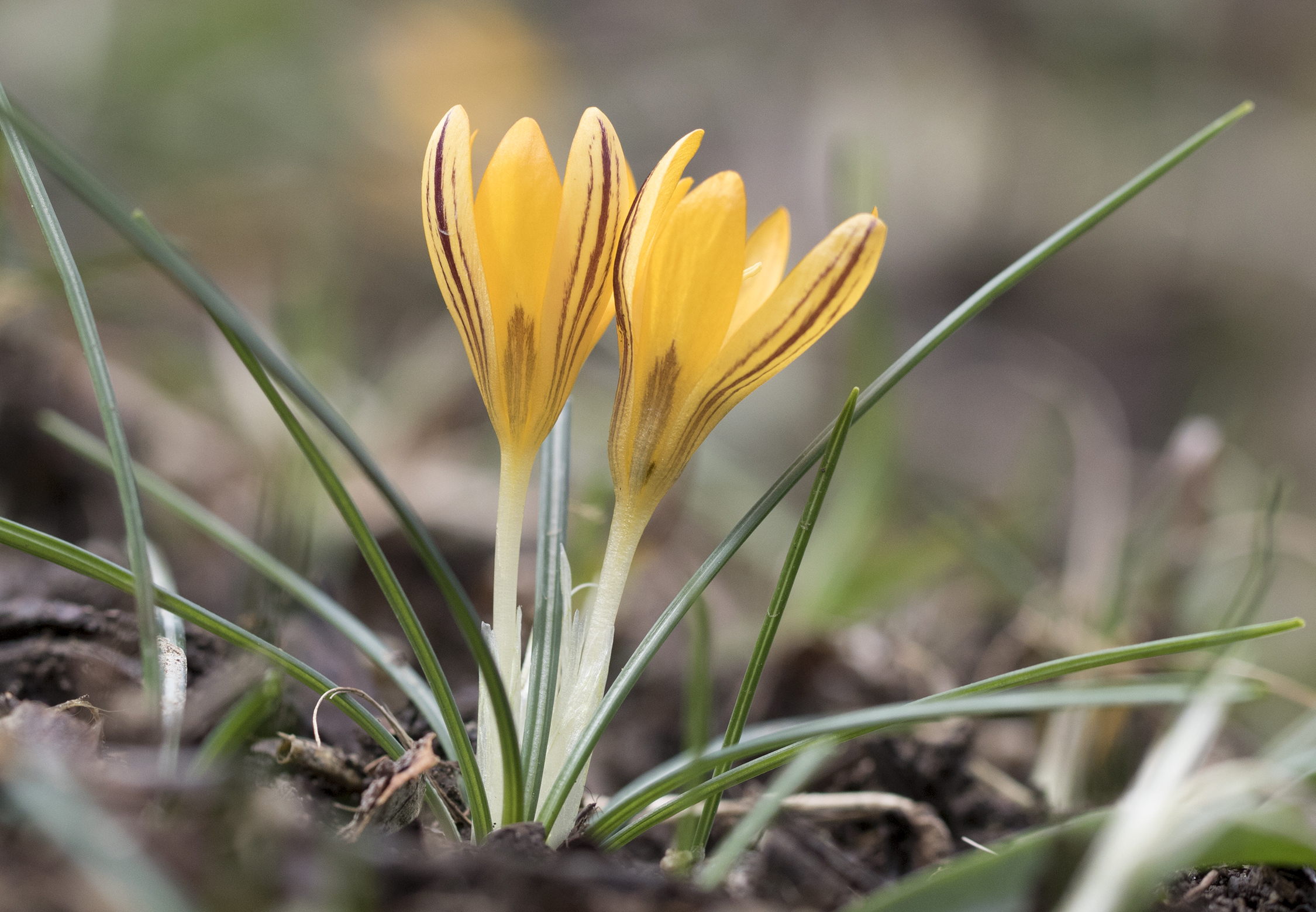
- Crocus vitellinus

Scientific classification
- Kingdom: Plantae
- Clade: Tracheophytes
- Clade: Angiosperms
- Clade: Monocots
- Order: Asparagales
- Family: Iridaceae
- Genus: Crocus
- Species: C. vitellinus

Binomial name
- Crocus vitellinus Wahlenb.

Synonyms
- Crocus syriacus Boiss. & Gaill.

= Crocus vitellinus =

Species of flowering plant

Crocus vitellinus is a species of flowering plant in the genus Crocus of the family Iridaceae. It is a cormous perennial native to N. Turkey, Lebanon-Syria, to Northern Israel.
