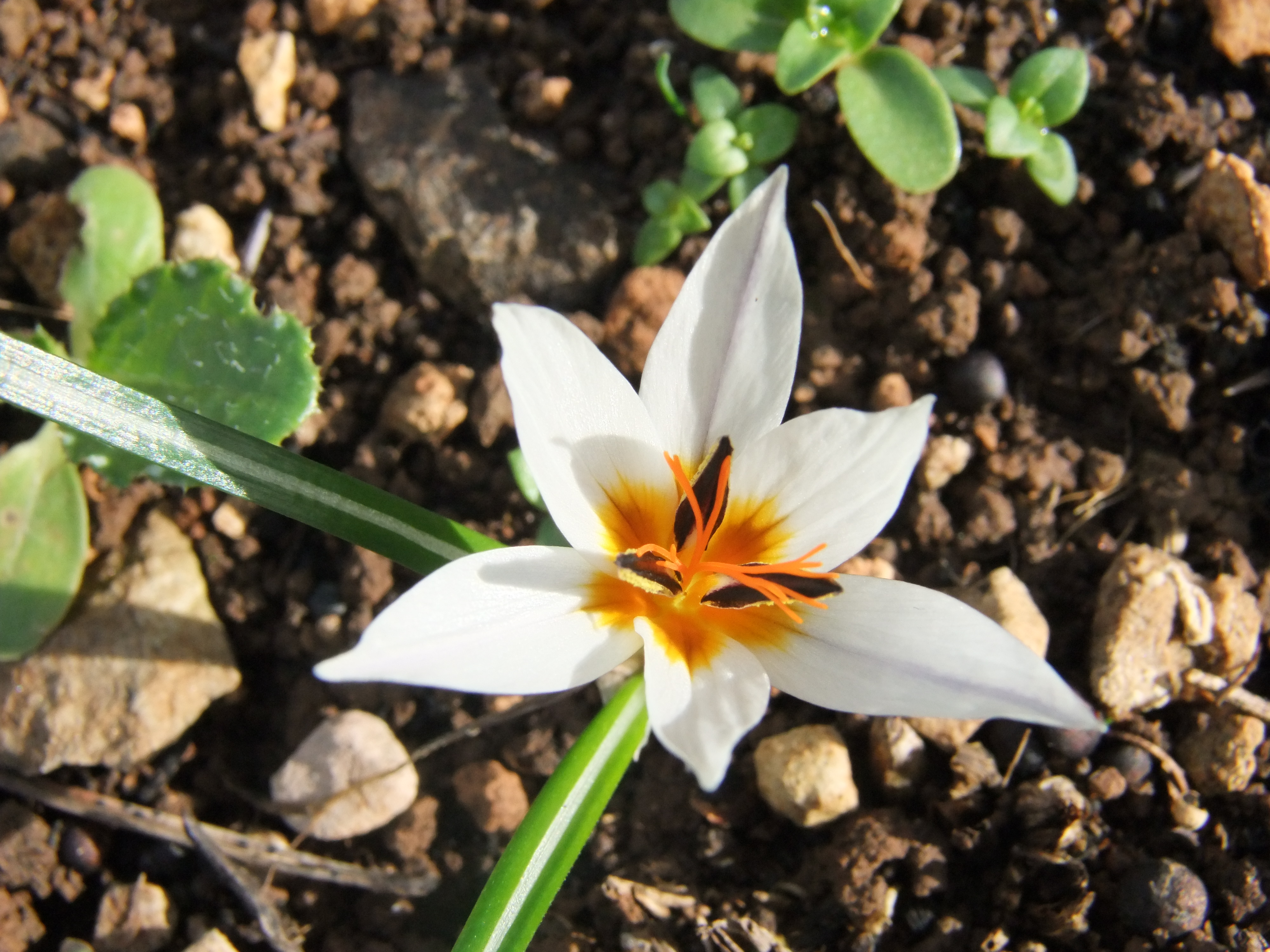

Conservation status
- Least Concern (IUCN 3.1)

Scientific classification
- Kingdom: Plantae
- Clade: Tracheophytes
- Clade: Angiosperms
- Clade: Monocots
- Order: Asparagales
- Family: Iridaceae
- Genus: Crocus
- Species: C. hyemalis

Binomial name
- Crocus hyemalis Boiss. & Blanche

= Crocus hyemalis =

Species of flowering plant

Crocus hyemalis is a species of flowering plant in the family Iridaceae. It is referred to by the common name winter saffron and is native to Lebanon-Syria and the Palestine region.
