= Cuscuta babylonica =

Scientific classification
- Kingdom: Plantae
- Clade: Tracheophytes
- Clade: Angiosperms
- Clade: Eudicots
- Clade: Asterids
- Order: Solanales
- Family: Convolvulaceae
- Genus: Cuscuta
- Species: C. babylonica

Binomial name
- Cuscuta babylonica Aucher ex Choisy

Subspecies
- Cuscuta babylonica var. elegans (Boiss. & Balansa) Engelm.

Synonyms
- Cuscuta elegans Boiss. & Balansa (syn. of C. babylonica var. elegans)

Species of flowering plant

Cuscuta babylonica is a species of parasitic plants in the morning glory family, Convolvulaceae. It is found in Iraq and Turkmenistan.

The plant shows supernumerary chromosomes which are holocentric during meiosis.

It is a parasite of Carthamus glaucus.
