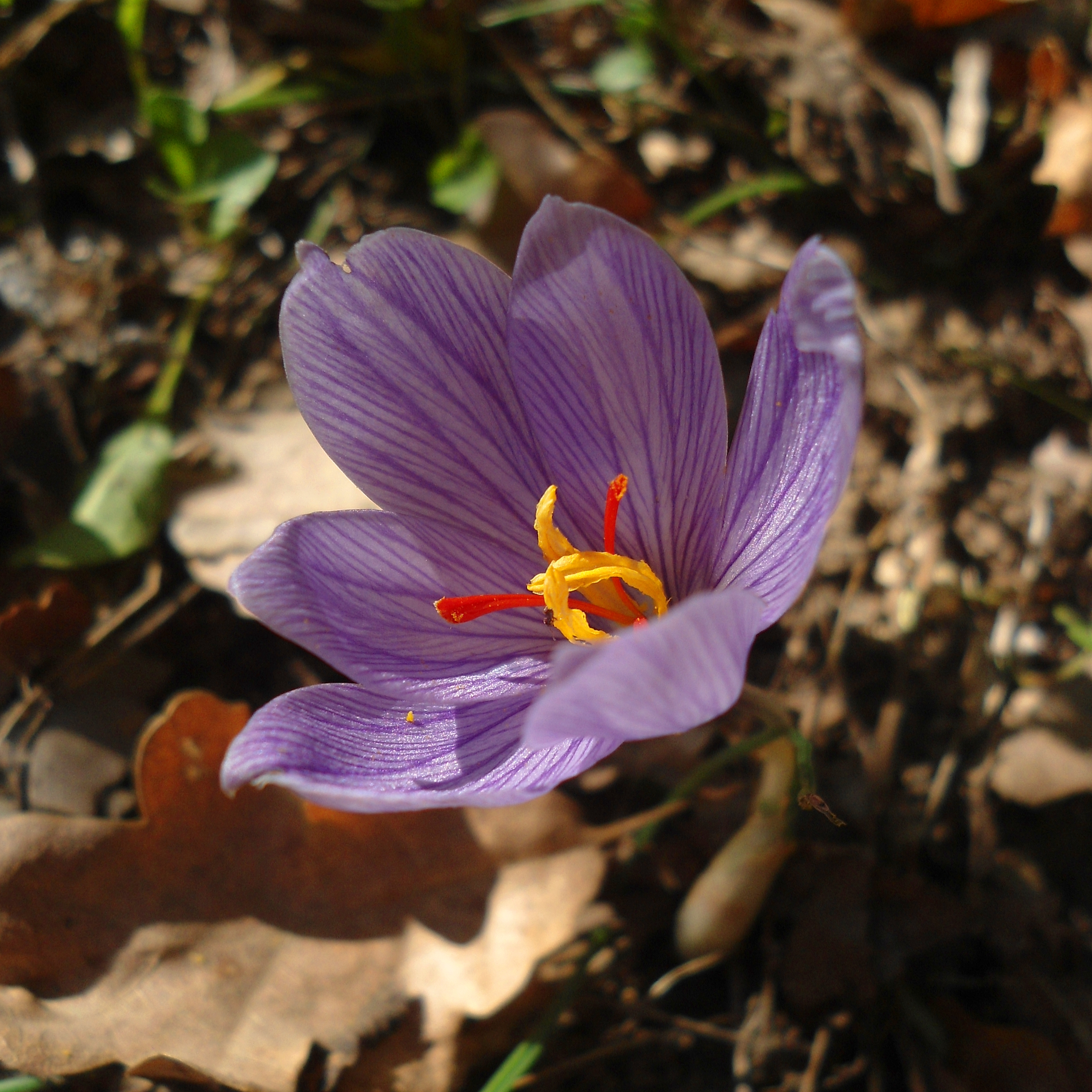

Scientific classification
- Kingdom: Plantae
- Clade: Tracheophytes
- Clade: Angiosperms
- Clade: Monocots
- Order: Asparagales
- Family: Iridaceae
- Genus: Crocus
- Species: C. pallasii

Binomial name
- Crocus pallasii Goldb.

= Crocus pallasii =

Species of flowering plant

Crocus pallasii is a species of flowering plant in the genus Crocus of the family Iridaceae, found from the Balkan Peninsula to Levant and West Iran. It is a possible ancestor of the domesticated saffron crocus, Crocus sativus.

== Sources ==
- Grilli Caiola, M. (2003), "Saffron Reproductive Biology", Acta Horticulturae, 650 (650), ISHS: 25–37, doi:10.17660/ActaHortic.2004.650.1, S2CID 89990377
- Negbi, M., ed. (1999), Saffron: Crocus sativus L., CRC Press, ISBN 978-90-5702-394-1
