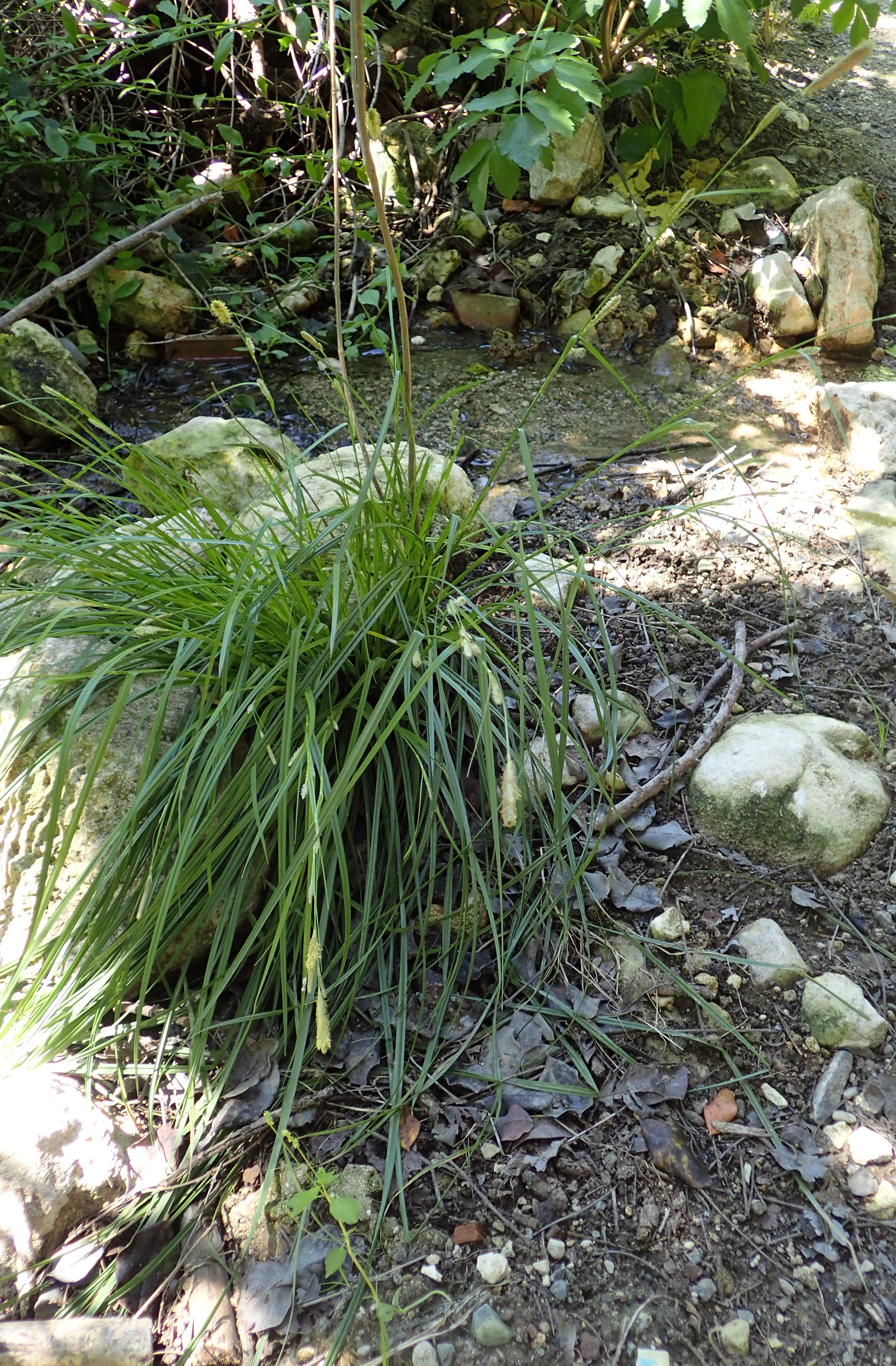

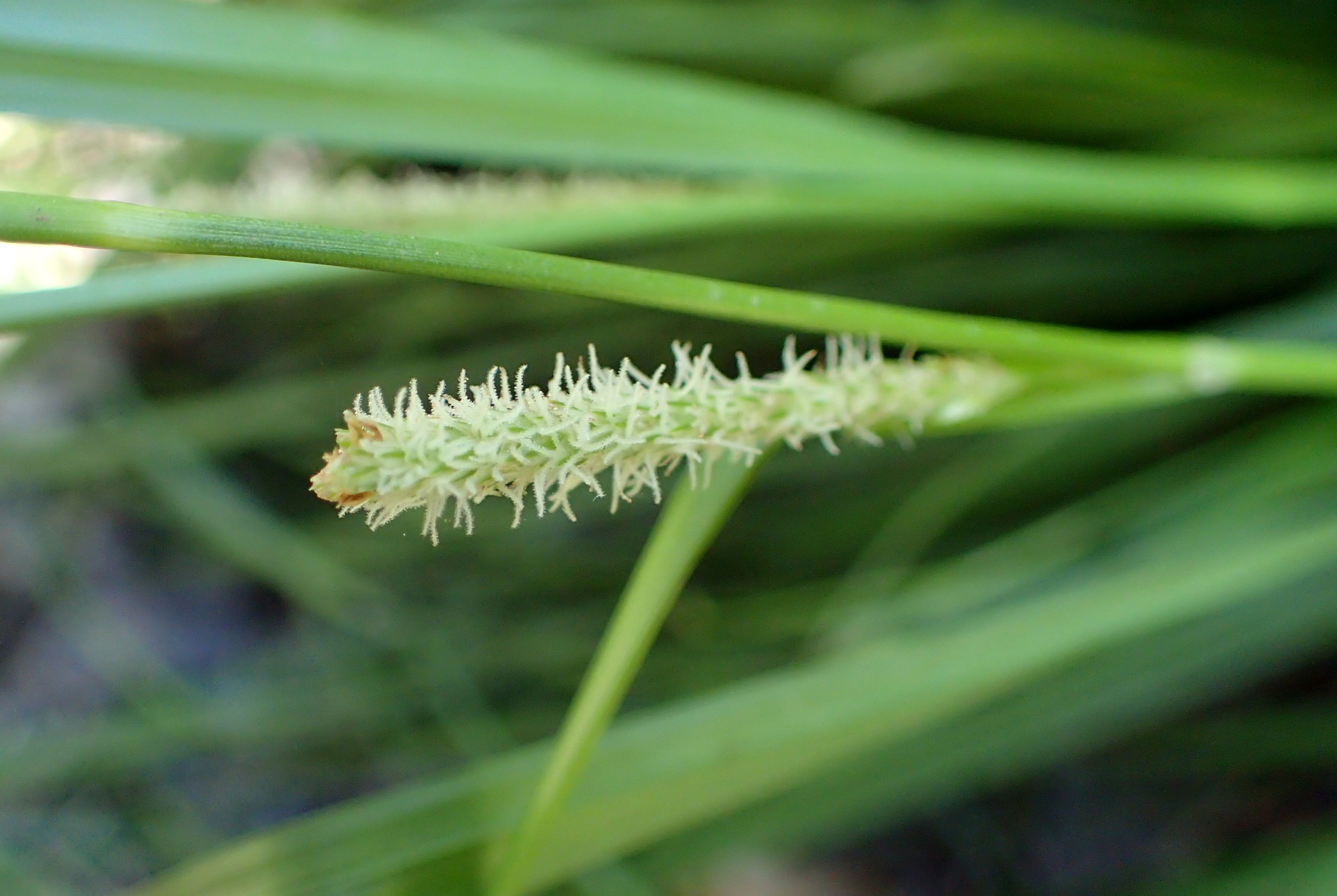
- A closeup of Carex hispida

Conservation status
- Least Concern (IUCN 3.1)

Scientific classification
- Kingdom: Plantae
- Clade: Tracheophytes
- Clade: Angiosperms
- Clade: Monocots
- Clade: Commelinids
- Order: Poales
- Family: Cyperaceae
- Genus: Carex
- Species: C. hispida

Binomial name
- Carex hispida Willd. ex Schkuhr

= Carex hispida =

Species of plant in the sedge family

Carex hispida (common name, hispid sedge) is a species of tussock-forming, grass-like perennial plant in the family Cyperaceae. It is native to the Mediterranean.

== Description ==
Carex hispida is a grass-like perennial plant, with stems growing from 45–100 cm in height. Basal sheaths are dark brown and fibrous. Leaves are 4–8 mm wide and shorter than the stems. It is a rhizomatous plant with multiple male and female spikes per stem. Female spikes are unusually long (4–12 cm), with very short beaks at the end of the spike.

== Distribution and habitat ==
Carex hispida favours wet, marshy conditions, such as non-saline bogs, ditches and marshlands.
