= C15H22O =

The molecular formula C_{15}H_{22}O (molar mass: 218.33 g/mol, exact mass: 218.1671 u) may refer to:

- Cyperotundone
- Germacrone
- Mustakone
- Nootkatone
- Rotundone
- α-Vetivone
