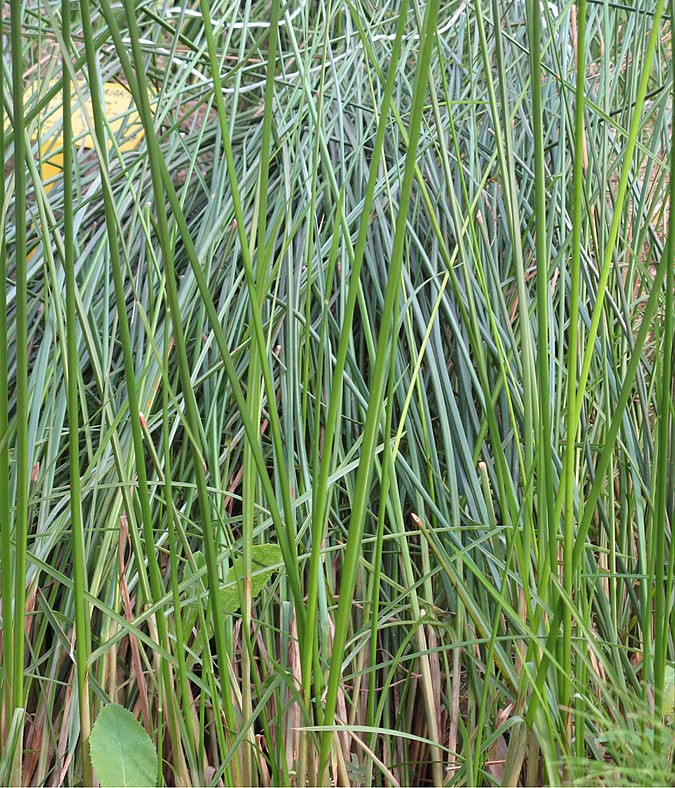

Conservation status
- Least Concern (IUCN 3.1)

Scientific classification
- Kingdom: Plantae
- Clade: Tracheophytes
- Clade: Angiosperms
- Clade: Monocots
- Clade: Commelinids
- Order: Poales
- Family: Cyperaceae
- Genus: Cyperus
- Species: C. articulatus

Binomial name
- Cyperus articulatus L. 1753

Synonyms
- List: Chlorocyperus articulatus (L.) Rikli; Chlorocyperus cordobensis Palla; Cyperus articulatus Benth.; Cyperus articulatus var. articulatus; Cyperus articulatus var. conglomeratus Britton; Cyperus articulatus var. erythrostachys Graebn.; Cyperus articulatus var. fistulosus Kük.; Cyperus articulatus f. longispiculosus Kük.; Cyperus articulatus var. multiflorus Kük.; Cyperus articulatus var. nodosus (Humb. & Bonpl. ex Willd.) Kük.; Cyperus autumnalis Pursh; Cyperus borbonicus Steud.; Cyperus cordobensis (Palla) Hicken; Cyperus corymbosus var. pangorei Rottb.; Cyperus corymbosus var. subnodosus (Nees & Meyen) Kük. ex Osten; Cyperus corymbosus var. subnodosus (Nees & Meyen) Kük.; Cyperus fistulosus Ehrenb. ex Boeckeler; Cyperus gymnos Schult.; Cyperus interceptus Steud.; Cyperus niloticus Forssk.; Cyperus nodosus Humb. & Bonpl. ex Willd.; Cyperus nodosus var. aphyllus Boeckeler; Cyperus nodosus var. subnodosus (Nees & Meyen) Boeckeler; Cyperus pertenuis Roxb.; Cyperus subarticulatus Nees & Meyen; Cyperus subnodosus Nees & Meyen; Papyrus pangorei Nees

= Cyperus articulatus =

Species of plant in the sedge family

Cyperus articulatus is an aromatic species of sedge known by the common names jointed flatsedge and priprioca. It has also been known as Guinea rush or adrue. It grows as a perennial herb. It grows in water or near it in rivers, streams, lakes, and swamps with a hyperhydrate (emergent aquatic) or possibly tenagophyte (submerged juvenile and terrestrial adult) growth pattern. It is widespread across tropical and subtropical regions in Africa, southern Asia, northern Australia, the southeastern United States, the West Indies, and Latin America. While it is closely related to highly invasive sedges such as purple nut sedge (Cyperus rotundus), priprioca is less prolific and competitive than its relative.

== Description ==
It is similar in appearance to C. corymbosus but with terete culms with 5–20 mm long intersepta and is transversely septate. Its leaf blades are completely absent and it has scale-like involucral bracts measuring less than 15 mm long. The anthers are 1.0–1.5 mm long and the floral glumes are 2.25–3.5 mm in length.

Genomic information
- NCBI ID: 1352543
- Number of chromosomes: 56

== Uses ==
Priprioca is related to other nut sedges (such as tigernut), and its roots release a light, woody, and spicy fragrance with floral notes. It is one of the traditional spices of the Amazon region, used medicinally in local tradition, and its reddish essential oil is used commercially both by the cosmetic industry, and increasingly as a flavoring for food.

Like its relative papyrus, priprioca fibers and rhizomes are also used in crafts, since in addition to the exuberant perfume, the products are resistant to mold, indicating that the essential oil may have antifungal properties. Among its main components are mustakone, α-pinene, β-pinene, caryophyllene oxide, trans-pinocarveol, myrtenal, myrtenol, ledol, cyperotundone, and α-cyperone, though no single element dominates. According to local Amazonian medical tradition, priprioca may be harmful to pregnant women, adverse effects possibly including miscarriage.

== In folklore ==
According to Brazilian folklore, the name priprioca came from Piri-Piri, a warrior who lived in an indigenous village in the heart of the Amazon rainforest. It is said that he gave off a wonderful smell, able to attract any indigenous tribe. He also had the power to disappear when in danger, or to escape the hordes of girls at his feet. Once, the daughter of a shaman named Supi was in love with Piri-Piri. She asked her father to teach her a spell to capture Piri-Piri. The shaman then told her to tie Piri-Piri's feet with her hair on a full moon night. Sensing danger, Piri-Piri disappeared in a cloud, never to return. In the place where the warrior was last seen, a plant sprouted which also gave off his magnificent aroma; in his honor, this plant was named piripirioca, later shortened to priprioca.

== See also ==
- List of Cyperus species
