= Musta =

- Cyperus rotundus, known as Cyperus_rotundus|Nagarmotha / Musta in ayurvedic medicine
- Mosta, Malta
- an album by Pate Mustajärvi
