= Carex longicaulis =

Scientific classification
- Kingdom: Plantae
- Clade: Tracheophytes
- Clade: Angiosperms
- Clade: Monocots
- Clade: Commelinids
- Order: Poales
- Family: Cyperaceae
- Genus: Carex
- Species: C. longicaulis

Binomial name
- Carex longicaulis Boeckeler

Species of plant

Carex longicaulis is a tussock-forming species of perennial sedge in the family Cyperaceae. It is native to parts of Mexico.

The species was first formally described by the botanist Johann Otto Boeckeler in 1882 as a part of the work Flora. It has one synonym;

- Carex ciliaris as described by Merritt Lyndon Fernald.

== See also ==
- List of Carex species
