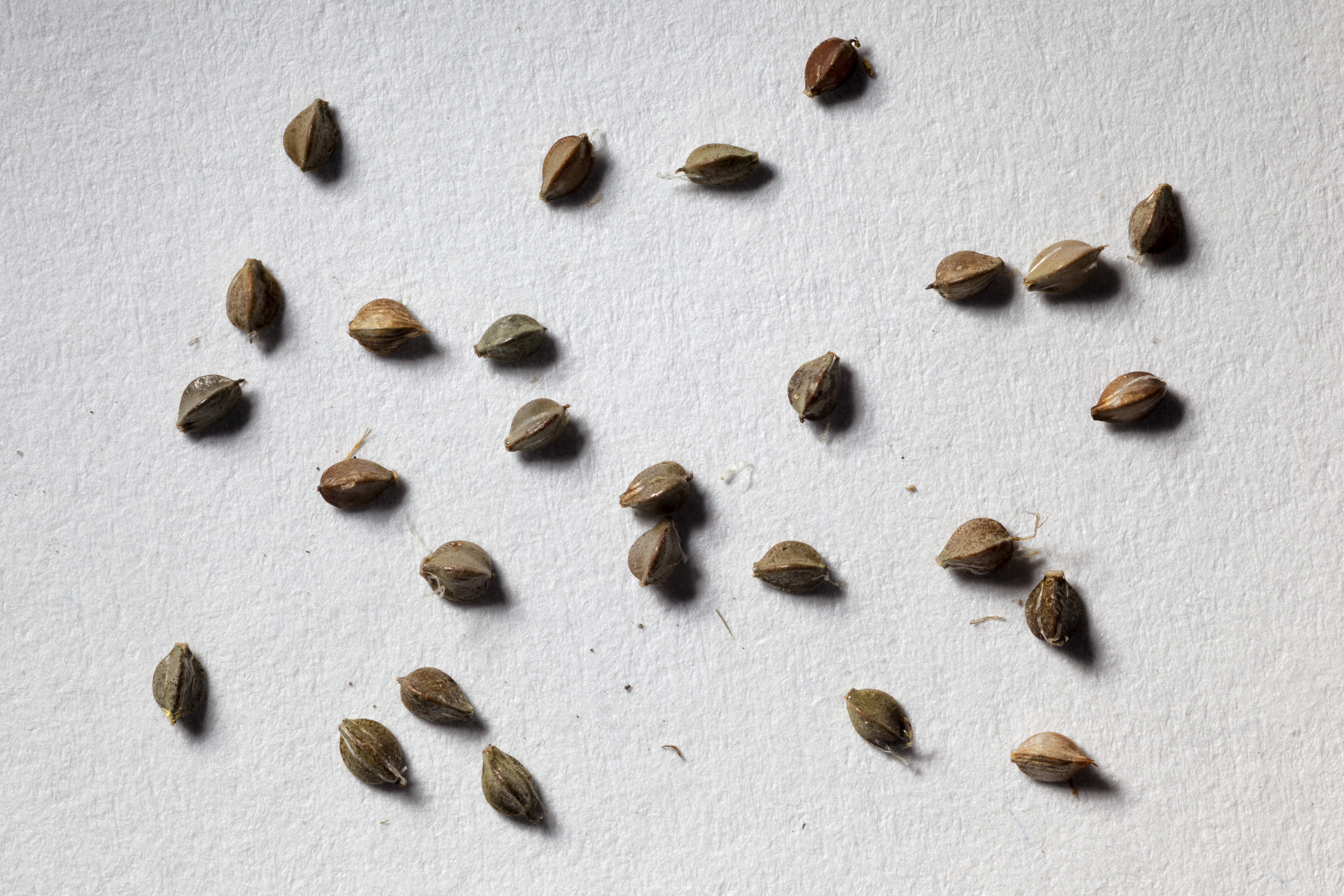
- Cyprus fendlerianus seeds

Scientific classification
- Kingdom: Plantae
- Clade: Tracheophytes
- Clade: Angiosperms
- Clade: Monocots
- Clade: Commelinids
- Order: Poales
- Family: Cyperaceae
- Genus: Cyperus
- Species: C. fendlerianus

Binomial name
- Cyperus fendlerianus Boeckeler

= Cyperus fendlerianus =

Species of sedge

Cyperus fendlerianus is a species of sedge that is endemic to the southern parts of North America.

The species was first formally described by the botanist Johann Otto Boeckeler in 1868.

== See also ==
- List of Cyperus species
