= Cyperus tetracarpus =

Scientific classification
- Kingdom: Plantae
- Clade: Tracheophytes
- Clade: Angiosperms
- Clade: Monocots
- Clade: Commelinids
- Order: Poales
- Family: Cyperaceae
- Genus: Cyperus
- Species: C. tetracarpus

Binomial name
- Cyperus tetracarpus Boeckeler

Species of sedge

Cyperus tetracarpus is a species of sedge that is endemic to Queensland in north eastern Australia.

The species was first formally described by the botanist Johann Otto Boeckeler in 1875.

== See also ==
- List of Cyperus species
