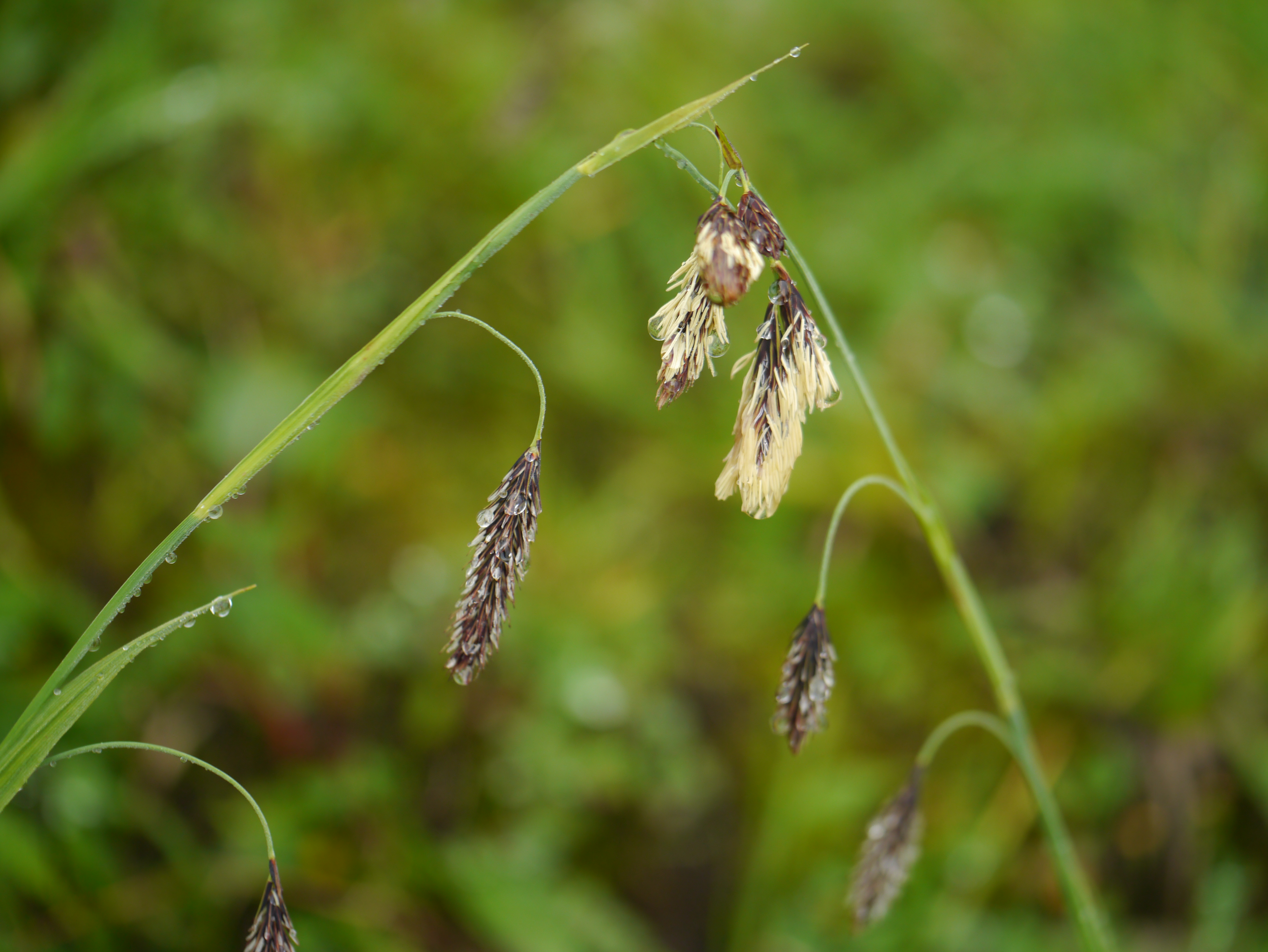

Scientific classification
- Kingdom: Plantae
- Clade: Tracheophytes
- Clade: Angiosperms
- Clade: Monocots
- Clade: Commelinids
- Order: Poales
- Family: Cyperaceae
- Genus: Carex
- Species: C. cruenta

Binomial name
- Carex cruenta Nees

= Carex cruenta =

Species of sedge

Carex cruenta is a tussock-forming species of perennial sedge in the family Cyperaceae. It is native to parts of Asia, from Pakistan in the west to south central parts of China in the east.

== Description ==
The 30 to 100 cm (12 to 39 in) tall sedge has a creeping rhizome covered in grey-brown fibrous scales. The erect culms are 20 to 75 cm (7.9 to 29.5 in) in length ith a triangular cross-section and covered by brown coloured sheaths near the base. The flat and linear leaves of the plant are always shorter than culms and are 3 to 4 mm (0.12 to 0.16 in) in width.

== Taxonomy ==
The species was described by the botanist Christian Gottfried Daniel Nees von Esenbeck in 1834 as a part of the work Contributions to the Botany of India. The type specimen was collected by Nathaniel Wallich in an area of alpine meadow in the Kumaon division of Uttar Pradesh in India. It has one synonym; Carex heterolepis as described by Johann Otto Boeckeler in 1888.

== Distribution ==
The range of the plant extends from northern parts of Pakistan in the west through the Himalayas including Nepal and Tibet and into southern parts of central China. It is found in subalpine or subarctic environments.

== See also ==
- List of Carex species
