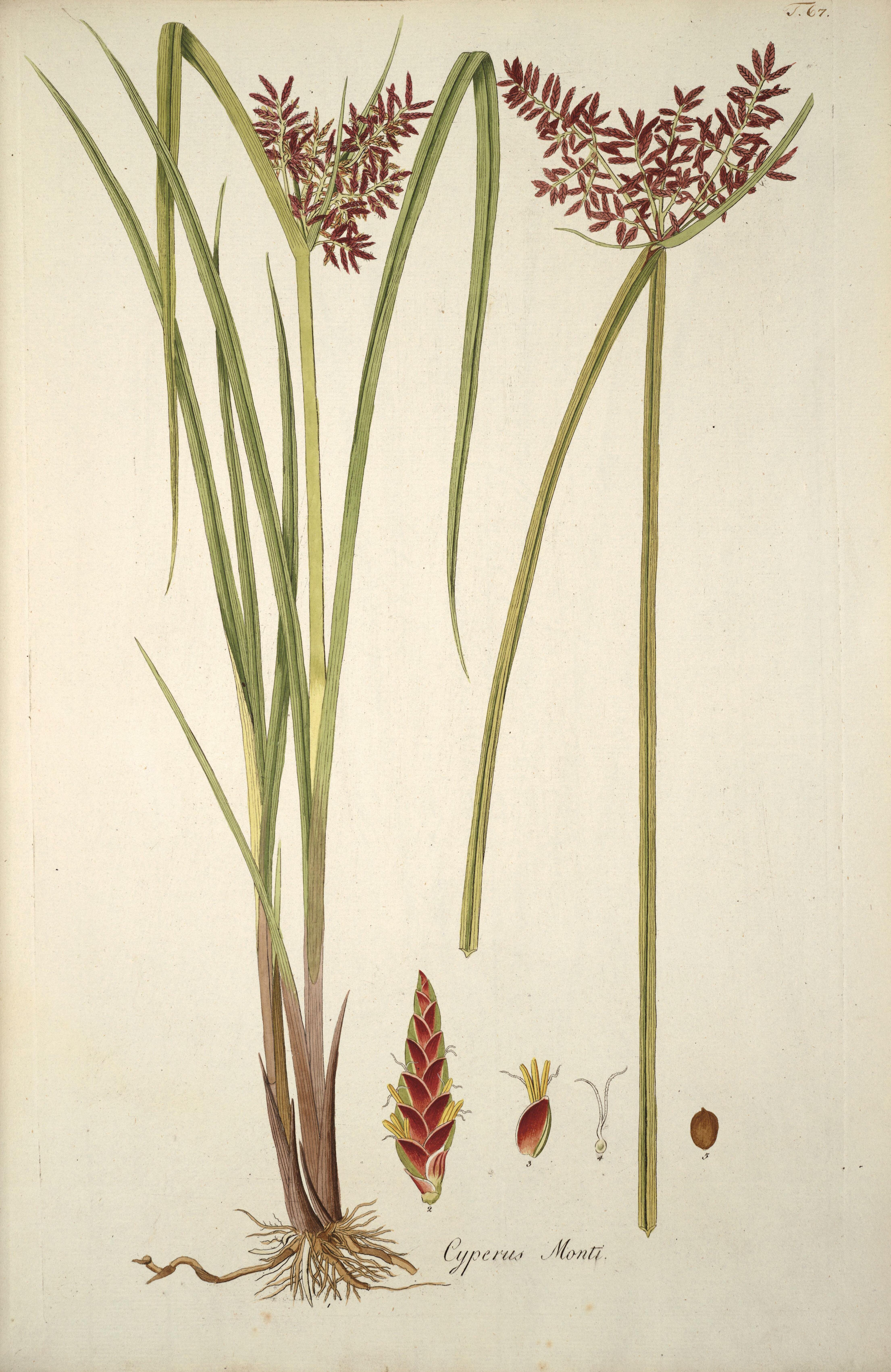

Scientific classification
- Kingdom: Plantae
- Clade: Tracheophytes
- Clade: Angiosperms
- Clade: Monocots
- Clade: Commelinids
- Order: Poales
- Family: Cyperaceae
- Genus: Cyperus
- Species: C. serotinus

Binomial name
- Cyperus serotinus Rottb.

= Cyperus serotinus =

Species of sedge

Cyperus serotinus is a species of sedge that is native to parts of Europe and Asia.

The species was first formally described by the botanist Christen Friis Rottbøll in 1773.

== Description ==
A moderately tall (30-70(120) cm) long-creeping sedge (with tubers) with solitary, triangular stem, leaves broad (4–10 mm), minutely rough-toothed (antrorsely-scabrid), diverging from the stem a little distance up, leaving a bare higher stretch of stem, the leaves as long as the stem or a little more. The 2-3(5) leafy bracts under the inflorescence resemble the leaves and much exceed the inflorescence.

The inflorescence is clearly terminal and composed usually of a number (5-10(15)) of unequal radiating axes ("rays", to 15 cm), themselves divided, with each ultimate axis unwinged, usually holding a fair number (7-14) of flat spikelets that are well-separated, forming a loose or slightly congested ladder of stalked, projecting spikelets, with even the end spikelets separated from neighbouring ones.

The spikelets are 2–3.5 mm wide ((5)10-15(30) mm long), each composed of 8-30 florets with broad scale-like glumes (2-2.5 x 1.5–2 mm) with wide pale margins and rounded tip, each floret maturing to hold a dark nut (1-1.2 mm, 2-faced, there being 2 barely-protruding stigma for the flower). .

=== Similar Species ===
- C. longus - which has fewer, narrower (1–2 mm wide) spikelets per cluster, that are poorly separated, on broadly-winged axes (seen on the final short stalks as they separate into a final cluster's spikelets), and the plant taller (to 100(150) cm) often with longer rays (to 30 cm, though they may be short, particularly for C. longus ssp. badius) and lacks tubers.
- C. rotundus - which has conspicuous long-exerted stigmas (very obvious at the right flowering stage), and as a plant is much smaller with slenderer stems to 40(60) cm, leaves to 30 cm x 5 mm, primary floral rays to 10 cm, the leaves seeming only at the base (poorly sheathing the stem and diverging from it low down) and shorter than the stem, uncommonly tubered, but with more ((2)3-6(8)) bracts and winged final floral axes, glumes longer and narrower (2.6-4.3 × 0.75-1.5 (2.4) mm), nut 3-sided. Large forms could superficially look like C. serotinus or C. longus.
- C. esculentus - smaller (resembling C. rotundus) but with yellow to bright yellow inflorescence, arranged with a ladder effect as C. serotinus.

== Range ==
North Mediterranean, Southern Asia - Afghanistan, Albania, Assam, Austria, Bangladesh, Bulgaria, Cambodia, Central European Rus, China North-Central, China South-Central, China Southeast, Corse, East Aegean Is., France, Hungary, India, Inner Mongolia, Iran, Italy, Japan, Kazakhstan, Kazan-retto, Kirgizstan, Korea, Manchuria, Nansei-shoto, North Caucasus, Pakistan, Portugal, Primorye, Romania, South European Russi, Spain, Tadzhikistan, Taiwan, Transcaucasus, Turkey, Turkey-in-Europe, Turkmenistan, Uzbekistan, Vietnam, West Himalaya, Xinjiang, Yugoslavia.

== Habitat ==
Shores, watersides, ditches, wet grasslands, reed beds, rice fields, tidal marshes; Turkey 0–200 m, Spain 0–1000 m.

== See also ==
- List of Cyperus species
