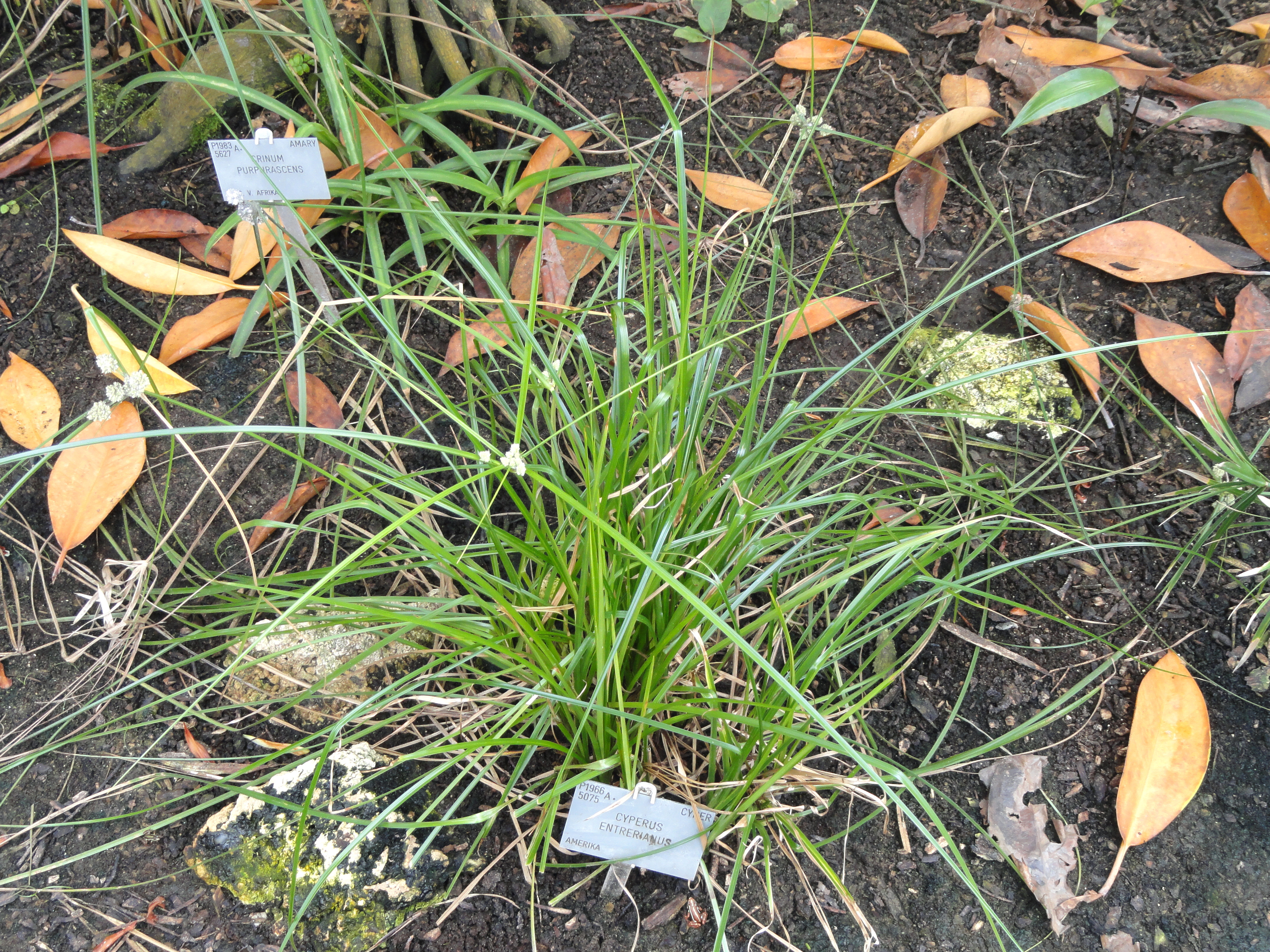

Scientific classification
- Kingdom: Plantae
- Clade: Tracheophytes
- Clade: Angiosperms
- Clade: Monocots
- Clade: Commelinids
- Order: Poales
- Family: Cyperaceae
- Genus: Cyperus
- Species: C. entrerianus

Binomial name
- Cyperus entrerianus Boeckeler

= Cyperus entrerianus =

Species of sedge

Cyperus entrerianus, commonly known as the woodrush flatsedge, is a species of sedge that is native to southern parts of North America, Central America, and parts of South America.

The species was first formally described by the botanist Johann Otto Boeckeler in 1878.

== See also ==
- List of Cyperus species
