= Cyperus unifolius =

Scientific classification
- Kingdom: Plantae
- Clade: Tracheophytes
- Clade: Angiosperms
- Clade: Monocots
- Clade: Commelinids
- Order: Poales
- Family: Cyperaceae
- Genus: Cyperus
- Species: C. unifolius

Binomial name
- Cyperus unifolius Boeckeler

Species of sedge

Cyperus unifolius is a species of sedge that is native to some islands in the Caribbean.

The species was first formally described by the botanist Johann Otto Boeckeler in 1870.

== See also ==
- List of Cyperus species
