= Carex fuscolutea =

Scientific classification
- Kingdom: Plantae
- Clade: Tracheophytes
- Clade: Angiosperms
- Clade: Monocots
- Clade: Commelinids
- Order: Poales
- Family: Cyperaceae
- Genus: Carex
- Species: C. fuscolutea

Binomial name
- Carex fuscolutea Boeckeler

Species of plant

Carex fuscolutea is a tussock-forming species of perennial sedge in the family Cyperaceae. It is native to parts of northern Mexico.

The species was first formally described by the botanist Johann Otto Boeckeler in 1886 as a part of the work Botanische Jahrbücher für Systematik, Pflanzengeschichte und Pflanzengeographie.

== See also ==
- List of Carex species
