= Cyperus hieronymi =

Scientific classification
- Kingdom: Plantae
- Clade: Tracheophytes
- Clade: Angiosperms
- Clade: Monocots
- Clade: Commelinids
- Order: Poales
- Family: Cyperaceae
- Genus: Cyperus
- Species: C. hieronymi

Binomial name
- Cyperus hieronymi Boeckeler

Species of sedge

Cyperus hieronymi is a species of sedge that is native to southern parts of South America. It occurs in Argentina, Bolivia and Paraguay.

The species was first formally described by the botanist Johann Otto Boeckeler in 1888.

== See also ==
- List of Cyperus species
