= Carex niederleiniana =

Scientific classification
- Kingdom: Plantae
- Clade: Tracheophytes
- Clade: Angiosperms
- Clade: Monocots
- Clade: Commelinids
- Order: Poales
- Family: Cyperaceae
- Genus: Carex
- Species: C. niederleiniana

Binomial name
- Carex niederleiniana Boeckeler

Synonyms
- Carex acutata var. niederleiniana (Boeckeler) Kük.; Carex acutata var. hirtisquama Kük.; Carex tucumanensis G.A.Wheeler

Species of plant

Carex niederleiniana is a tussock-forming species of perennial sedge in the family Cyperaceae. It is native to parts of Argentina.

== See also ==
- List of Carex species
