= Cyperus fertilis =

Scientific classification
- Kingdom: Plantae
- Clade: Tracheophytes
- Clade: Angiosperms
- Clade: Monocots
- Clade: Commelinids
- Order: Poales
- Family: Cyperaceae
- Genus: Cyperus
- Species: C. fertilis

Binomial name
- Cyperus fertilis Boeckeler, 1883

Species of sedge

Cyperus fertilis is a species of sedge that is native to parts of Africa that is part of the "Cyperus" Genus in addition to the Cyperaceae Family.

== See also ==
- List of Cyperus species
