= Carex diminuta =

Scientific classification
- Kingdom: Plantae
- Clade: Tracheophytes
- Clade: Angiosperms
- Clade: Monocots
- Clade: Commelinids
- Order: Poales
- Family: Cyperaceae
- Genus: Carex
- Species: C. diminuta

Binomial name
- Carex diminuta Boeckeler

Species of plant

Carex diminuta is a tussock-forming species of perennial sedge in the family Cyperaceae. It is native to parts of China.

The species was first formally described by the botanist Johann Otto Boeckeler in 1890 as a part of the work Beitráge zur Kenntniss der Cyperaceen.

== See also ==
- List of Carex species
