= Carex helferi =

Scientific classification
- Kingdom: Plantae
- Clade: Tracheophytes
- Clade: Angiosperms
- Clade: Monocots
- Clade: Commelinids
- Order: Poales
- Family: Cyperaceae
- Genus: Carex
- Species: C. helferi

Binomial name
- Carex helferi Boeckeler

Species of plant

Carex helferi is a tussock-forming species of perennial sedge in the family Cyperaceae. It is native to parts of South East Asia.

== Description ==
The sedge has a woody rhizome with central culms that have a triangular cross-section with a length of 20 to 50 cm (7.9 to 19.7 in) and a width of 1 to 3 mm (0.039 to 0.118 in) and that are smooth lower down with a rough texture toward the top. It has basal flattish to folded lengthwise leaves with a broadly linear to lanceolate shaped blade that is 17 to 60 cm (6.7 to 23.6 in) long with a 1 to 7 cm (0.39 to 2.76 in) long dark brown sheaths that usually disintegrate. The narrow inflorescences appear as a narrow branched cluster with a length of 17 to 20 cm (6.7 to 7.9 in) with three to six crowded to distant nodes.

== Taxonomy ==
The species was first formally described by the botanist Johann Otto Boeckeler in 1876 as a part of the work Linnaea. It has two synonyms;

- Carex helferi subsp. mapaniifolia (Ridl.) T.Koyama
- Carex mapaniifolia Ridl.

== Distribution ==
It is often situated along river banks in the understorey of evergreen forests from an altitude of 0 to 400 m (0 to 1,312 ft) in tropical biomes, the range of the plant extends from Myanmar in the north to Thailand in the south and on the island of Java in Indonesia.

== See also ==
- List of Carex species
