= Carex pseudobicolor =

Scientific classification
- Kingdom: Plantae
- Clade: Tracheophytes
- Clade: Angiosperms
- Clade: Monocots
- Clade: Commelinids
- Order: Poales
- Family: Cyperaceae
- Genus: Carex
- Species: C. pseudobicolor

Binomial name
- Carex pseudobicolor Boeckeler

Species of plant

Carex pseudobicolor is a tussock-forming species of perennial sedge in the family Cyperaceae. It is native to parts of Asia from Afghanistan and Pakistan in the west to Tibet in the east.

== See also ==
- List of Carex species
