= Carex elatior =

Scientific classification
- Kingdom: Plantae
- Clade: Tracheophytes
- Clade: Angiosperms
- Clade: Monocots
- Clade: Commelinids
- Order: Poales
- Family: Cyperaceae
- Genus: Carex
- Species: C. elatior

Binomial name
- Carex elatior Boeckeler

Species of plant

Carex elatior is a tussock-forming species of perennial sedge in the family Cyperaceae. It is native to parts of central Madagascar.

The species was first formally described by the botanist Johann Otto Boeckeler in 1880 as a part of the work Abhandlungen herausgegeben vom Naturwissenschaftlichen Vereins zu Bremen. It has one synonym; Carex elatior var. perrieri.

== See also ==
- List of Carex species
