= Cyperus hemisphaericus =

Scientific classification
- Kingdom: Plantae
- Clade: Tracheophytes
- Clade: Angiosperms
- Clade: Monocots
- Clade: Commelinids
- Order: Poales
- Family: Cyperaceae
- Genus: Cyperus
- Species: C. hemisphaericus

Binomial name
- Cyperus hemisphaericus Boeckeler

Species of sedge

Cyperus hemisphaericus is a species of sedge that is endemic to eastern parts of Africa.

== Description ==
The perennial plant has a creeping but short rhizome that has a tufted grass-like habit and grows to a height of approximately 130 cm (51 in). It has many crowded basal leaves and stems that are 15 to 90 cm (5.9 to 35.4 in) in length and 2 to 4 mm (0.079 to 0.157 in) wide with a triangular cross section. The flat to folded slightly stiff leaves are 10 to 50 cm (3.9 to 19.7 in) in length with a width of 5 to 13 mm (0.20 to 0.51 in).

== Taxonomy ==
The species was first formally described by the botanist Johann Otto Boeckeler in 1859.

== Distribution ==
The range of the plant extends from Somalia in the north down to Mozambique in the south along eastern Africa including the island of Madagascar. The plant grows from sea level to an altitude of approximately 100 m (330 ft). It is often situated as a part of open grassland, wooded grassland and Brachystegia woodland communities as well as savannah and seasonally wet grassland communities.

== See also ==
- List of Cyperus species
