= Cyperus holstii =

Conservation status
- Vulnerable (IUCN 3.1)

Scientific classification
- Kingdom: Plantae
- Clade: Tracheophytes
- Clade: Angiosperms
- Clade: Monocots
- Clade: Commelinids
- Order: Poales
- Family: Cyperaceae
- Genus: Cyperus
- Species: C. holstii

Binomial name
- Cyperus holstii Kük.

Species of plant native to Africa

Cyperus holstii is a species of sedge that is native to central Africa, including the Democratic Republic of the Congo, Tanzania, and Kenya.

The species was first formally described by the botanist Georg Kükenthal in 1925.

== Ecology and distribution ==
In Tropical Africa, the biology of Cyperus holstii is a perennial herb to 1, 15 m tall, with stolons c. (2 mm) and is covered by loose scales; culms few (45-67 cm long, 3,5-6 mm), trigonous; leaves (1-31 to 50 cm long); sheath is pale brown, and is sometimes pale reddish-brown (6-12 cm long); blade flat (16-38 cm long, 5,5-10 mm).

Cyperus holstii grows on seasonally wet grassland; alongside pools; swamps; 0-250 m alt. Very similar to C. longus from which it differs by its longer peduncles (10-30 cm vs. 0,5-10 cm), more numerous (6-9 vs. 2-5) and larger involucral bracts (15-40x0, 4-0,8 cm vs. 6-28x0, 2-0,5 cm).

== See also ==
- List of Cyperus species
