= Carex johnstonii =

Scientific classification
- Kingdom: Plantae
- Clade: Tracheophytes
- Clade: Angiosperms
- Clade: Monocots
- Clade: Commelinids
- Order: Poales
- Family: Cyperaceae
- Genus: Carex
- Species: C. johnstonii

Binomial name
- Carex johnstonii Boeckeler

Species of plant

Carex johnstonii is a tussock-forming species of perennial sedge in the family Cyperaceae. It is native to parts of central and eastern Africa.

The species was first formally described by the botanist Johann Otto Boeckeler in 1886 as a part of the work Botanische Jahrbücher für Systematik, Pflanzengeschichte und Pflanzengeographie.

== See also ==
- List of Carex species
