= Carex alascana =

Scientific classification
- Kingdom: Plantae
- Clade: Tracheophytes
- Clade: Angiosperms
- Clade: Monocots
- Clade: Commelinids
- Order: Poales
- Family: Cyperaceae
- Genus: Carex
- Species: C. alascana

Binomial name
- Carex alascana Boeckeler

Species of plant

Carex alascana is a tussock-forming species of perennial sedge in the family Cyperaceae. It is native to parts of Siberia, Canada, northern parts of the United States and Greenland.

== See also ==
- List of Carex species
