= Carex ceylanica =

Scientific classification
- Kingdom: Plantae
- Clade: Tracheophytes
- Clade: Angiosperms
- Clade: Monocots
- Clade: Commelinids
- Order: Poales
- Family: Cyperaceae
- Genus: Carex
- Species: C. ceylanica

Binomial name
- Carex ceylanica Boeckeler

Species of plant

Carex ceylanica is a tussock-forming species of perennial sedge in the family Cyperaceae. It is native to parts of Sri Lanka.

The species was first formally described by the botanist Johann Otto Boeckeler in 1876 as a part of the work Linnaea.

== See also ==
- List of Carex species
