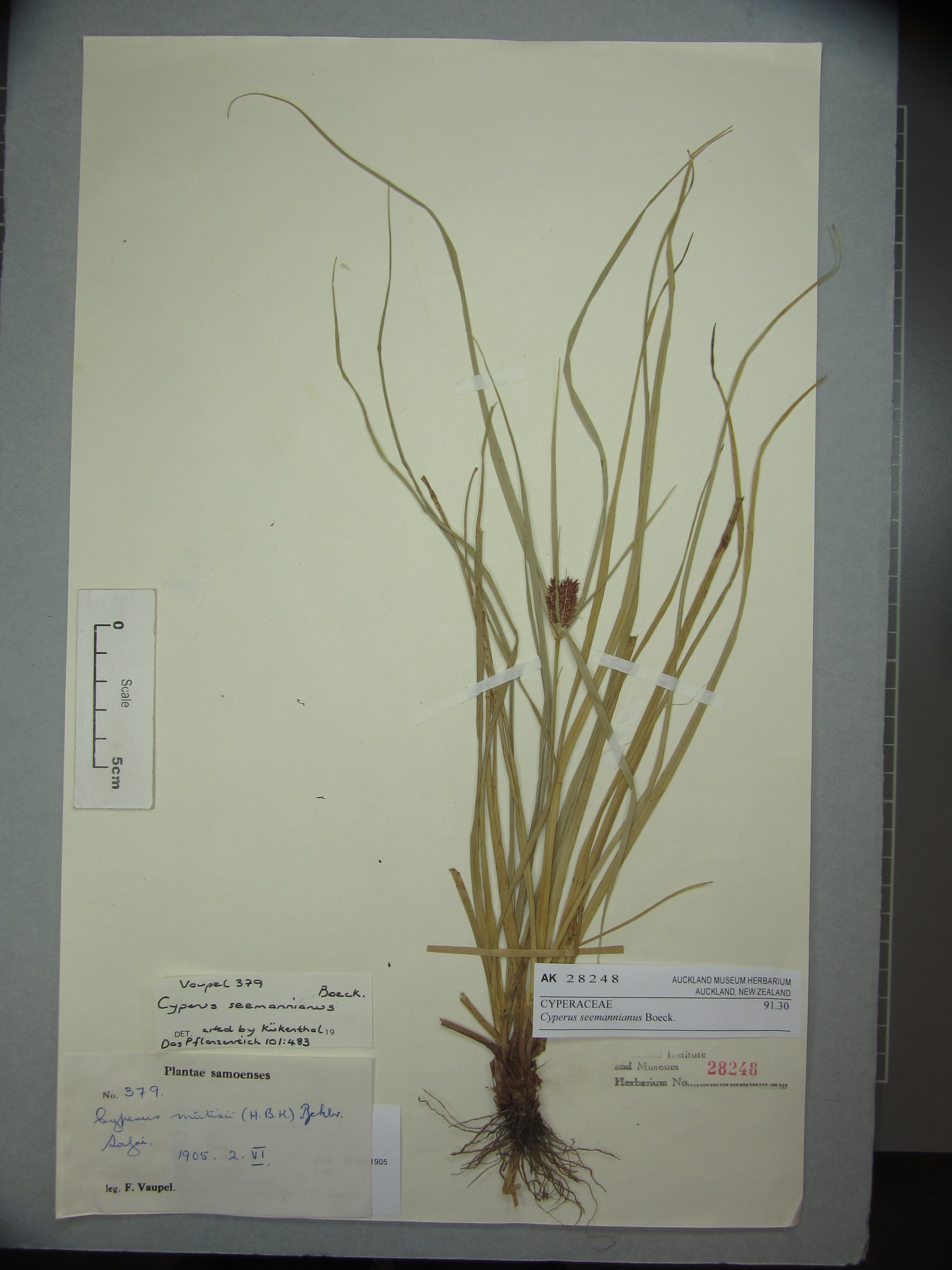
- Herbarium specimen from the Auckland War Memorial Museum

Scientific classification
- Kingdom: Plantae
- Clade: Tracheophytes
- Clade: Angiosperms
- Clade: Monocots
- Clade: Commelinids
- Order: Poales
- Family: Cyperaceae
- Genus: Cyperus
- Species: C. seemannianus

Binomial name
- Cyperus seemannianus Boeckeler

= Cyperus seemannianus =

Species of sedge

Cyperus seemannianus is a species of sedge native to Fiji, Niue, the Samoan Islands, Society Islands, Tonga, Vanuatu, and Wallis and Futuna in the South Pacific.

The species was first formally described by the botanist Johann Otto Boeckeler in 1870.

== See also ==
- List of Cyperus species
