= Cyperus glaucophyllus =

Scientific classification
- Kingdom: Plantae
- Clade: Tracheophytes
- Clade: Angiosperms
- Clade: Monocots
- Clade: Commelinids
- Order: Poales
- Family: Cyperaceae
- Genus: Cyperus
- Species: C. glaucophyllus

Binomial name
- Cyperus glaucophyllus Boeckeler

Species of sedge

Cyperus glaucophyllus is a species of sedge that is endemic to eastern Africa, ranging from Sudan in the north to South Africa's Northern Provinces and KwaZulu-Natal in the south.

The species was first formally described by the botanist Johann Otto Boeckeler in 1888.

== See also ==
- List of Cyperus species
