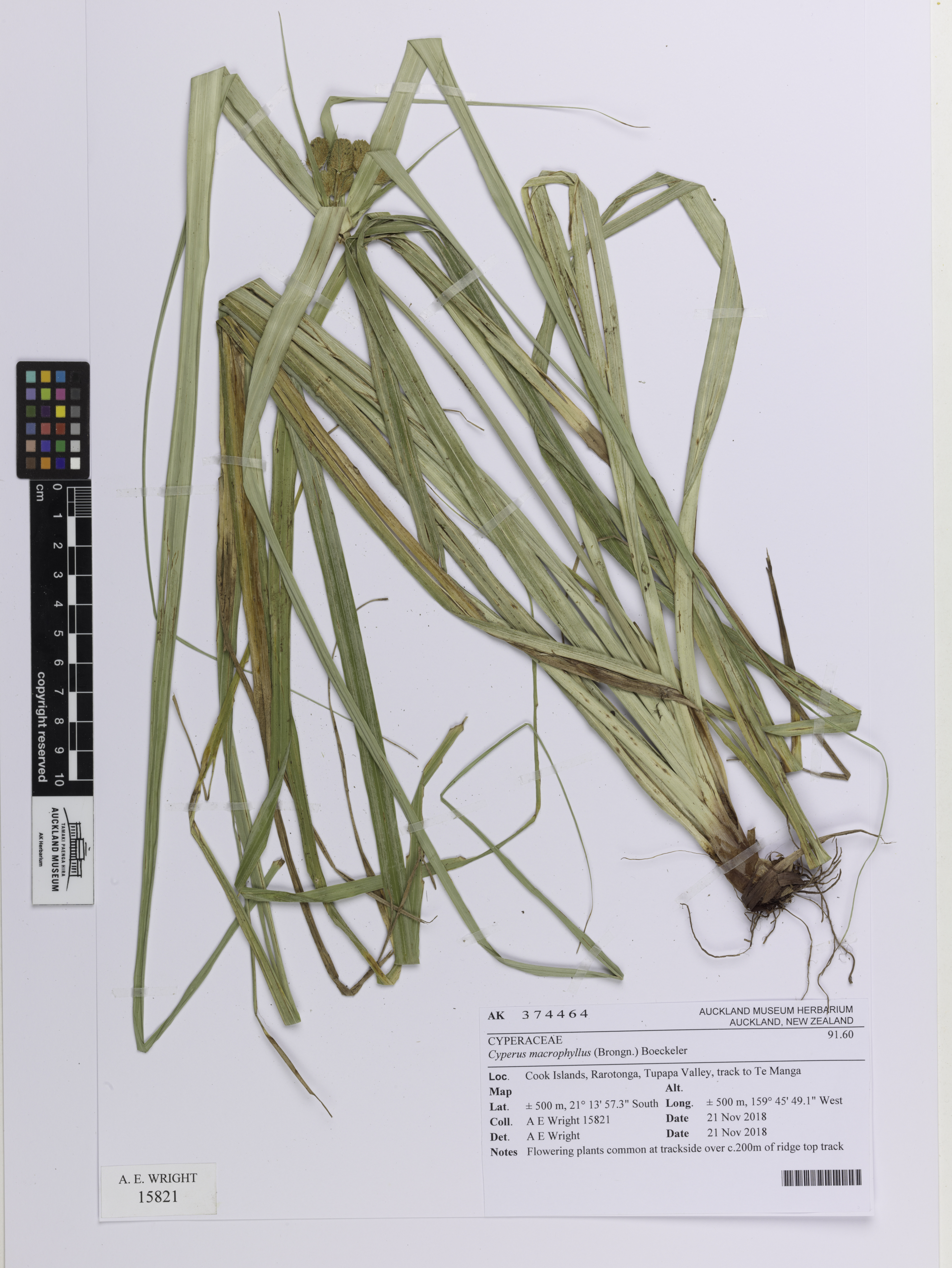
- Herbarium specimen from the Auckland War Memorial Museum

Scientific classification
- Kingdom: Plantae
- Clade: Embryophytes
- Clade: Tracheophytes
- Clade: Angiosperms
- Clade: Monocots
- Clade: Commelinids
- Order: Poales
- Family: Cyperaceae
- Genus: Cyperus
- Species: C. macrophyllus

Binomial name
- Cyperus macrophyllus (Brongn.) Boeckeler (1870)

Synonyms
- Borabora cyperoidea Steud. (1854); Mariscus macrophyllus Brongn. (1834)

= Cyperus macrophyllus =

Species of sedge

Cyperus macrophyllus is a species of sedge that is native to the Cook Islands, Pitcairn Islands, and Society Islands in the Pacific Ocean.

== See also ==
- List of Cyperus species
