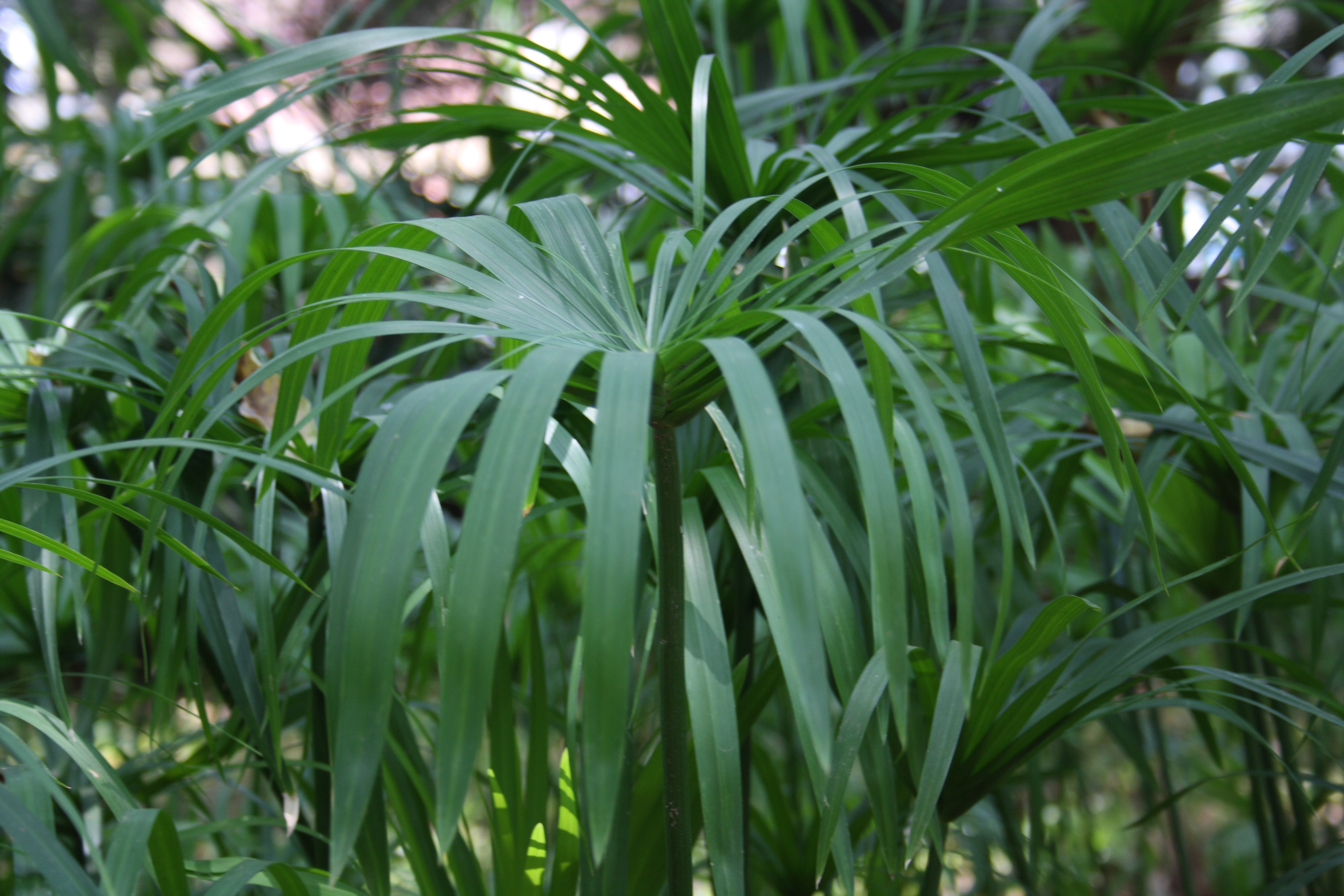

Scientific classification
- Kingdom: Plantae
- Clade: Embryophytes
- Clade: Tracheophytes
- Clade: Spermatophytes
- Clade: Angiosperms
- Clade: Monocots
- Clade: Commelinids
- Order: Poales
- Family: Cyperaceae
- Genus: Cyperus
- Species: C. scariosus

Binomial name
- Cyperus scariosus R.Br.

Synonyms
- Cyperus corymbosus var. scariosus (R.Br.) Kük.

= Cyperus scariosus =

Species of plant

Cyperus scariosus is a perennial herbaceous plant from Australia and New Guinea.

In parts of India, the name is commonly misapplied to Cyperus pertenuis.

== Description ==
Cyperus scariosus is very similar to C. pertenuis.

Georg Kükenthal thought it was a variety of C. corymbosus.

== Taxonomy ==
The species was first formally described by the botanist Robert Brown in 1810. The species C. pertenuis, only collected in Bangladesh and Myanmar (but likely also found in India), was considered a synonym by Charles Baron Clarke in 1894. Rafaël Govaerts considered it a synonym of Cyperus articulatus in 2007, but as of 2012 C. pertenuis is considered an independent species again.

== Distribution ==
It occurs in Papua New Guinea and Australia. It is not known from the Indian subcontinent. There are a four collections of C. pertenuis from Myanmar and Bangladesh, and the species was thus once thought to be native to these countries, such as in a database maintained by Rafaël Govaerts in the early 2000s, which has caused someone maintaining the Plants of the World database to now incorrectly claim the species is introduced in these two countries. The distributional status of this species or C. pertenuis in Java is unclear.

In Australia it occurs in northern, eastern and central Queensland, northern Northern Territory and Western Australia.

== Uses ==
An essential oil called cypriol or nagarmotha oil is distilled from the roots. Cypriol has an aroma described as "woody, earthy, dry, spicy, patchouli, vetiver".

== See also ==
- List of Cyperus species
