= Cyperotundone =

Names
- IUPAC name (1R,7R,10R)-4,10,11,11-tetramethyltricyclo[5.3.1.01,5]undec-4-en-3-one

Identifiers
CAS Number	3466-15-7
3D model (JSmol)	Interactive image
ChEBI	CHEBI:81137
ChemSpider	30791649
KEGG	C17501
PubChem CID	12308615
CompTox Dashboard (EPA)	DTXSID901316512
- InChI: InChI=1S/C15H22O/c1-9-5-6-11-7-12-10(2)13(16)8-15(9,12)14(11,3)4/h9,11H,5-8H2,1-4H3/t9-,11-,15+/m1/s1 Key: GIGKXOAUYMWORB-OSQNNJELSA-N
- SMILES: CC1(C)[C@]23C(C[C@H]1CC[C@H]2C)=C(C)C(=O)C3

Properties
Chemical formula	C_{15}H_{22}O
Molar mass	218.340 g·mol^{−1}
Melting point	46–47.5 °C (114.8–117.5 °F; 319.1–320.6 K)
Boiling point	286.40 °C
Solubility in water	0.04497 g/L
log P	6.570

Hazards
Flash point	114.50 °C
- Except where otherwise noted, data are given for materials in their standard state (at 25 °C [77 °F], 100 kPa). Infobox references

Cyperotundone is an organic ketone with the formula C_{15}H_{22}O. It is found in many essential oils including that of Cyperus articulatus and Cyperus rotundus.
