= Al-Khiday =

Archeological sites in central Sudan

al-Khiday
- Site location in Sudan
- ~15°30′N 32°24′E
- Type: Burial
- Location: Khartoum, Sudan
- Region: Sub-Saharan Africa

Al-Khiday is an archeological collection of 5 established sites in central Sudan on the Western bank of the White Nile near Khartoum. It was discovered through survey alongside the construction of a new road by the Italian Archeological Mission in 2004. The most significant of these sites is al-Khiday 2, a multi-staged cemetery which encompasses the span of occupation at this location. The site contains evidence of discrete period occupations identified through burial phases, associated goods and living floors. These periods are the Pre-Mesolithic, Mesolithic, Neolithic and Classic/Late Meroitic (time period relating to the ancient city of Meroë).

== Pre-Mesolithic ==
There is little recorded data found about the Pre-Mesolithic for this site, due to the fact that many of the burials were disturbed by the Neolithic and Meroitic occupations. However, around 90 bodies were excavated that can be attributed to the Pre-Mesolithic occupation of al-Khiday 2. They were distinguished through their extended and prone positions. The bodies were dated based on lack of collagen and prior stratigraphic data. This mound was likely chosen by Pre-Mesolithic people as a burial site due to its adjacency to the White Nile.

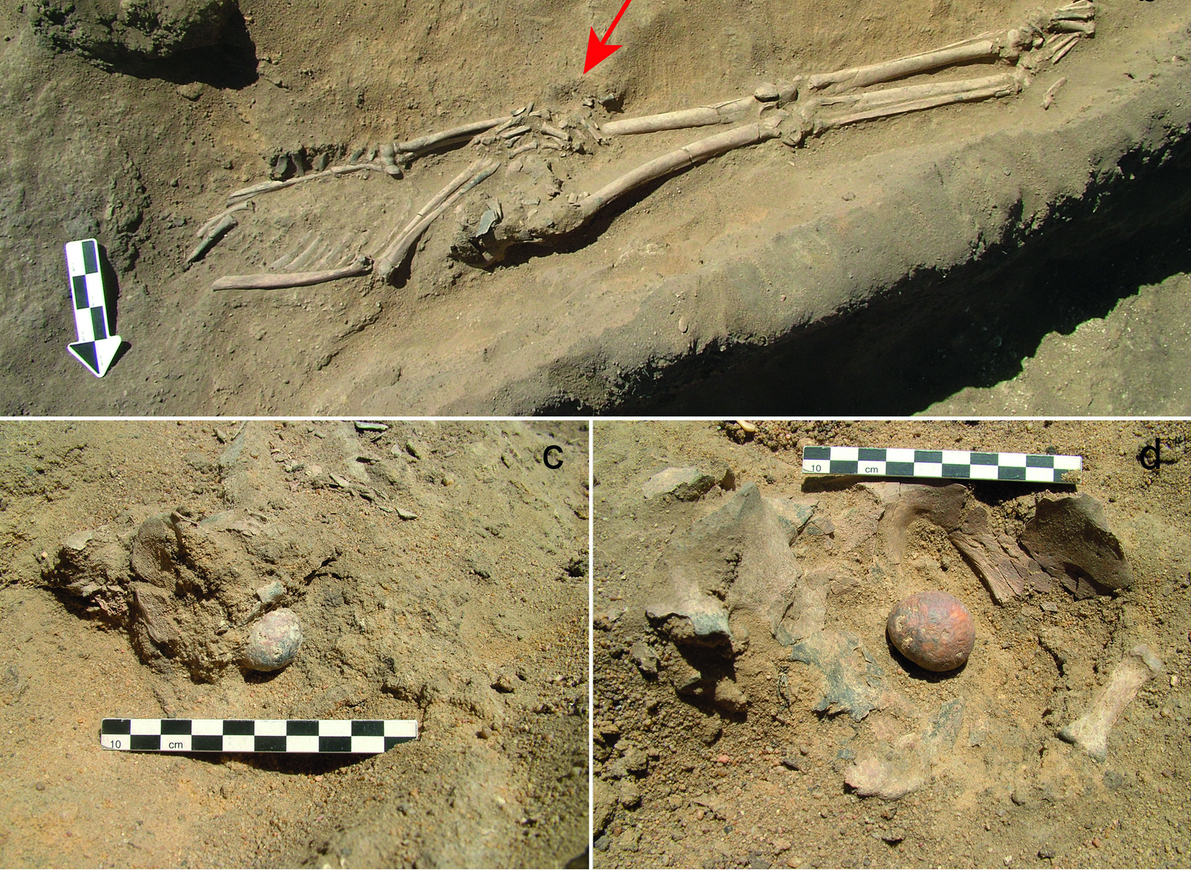
Images of the individual and prostatic stones found in association

An influential find of the Pre-Mesolithic occupation was the discovery of three prostatic stones found within the burial of an individual. These three Prostatic calculi with the occurrence of bacterial imprints link to evidence of a bacterial infection, that of lithiasis, the earliest known case.

== Mesolithic ==
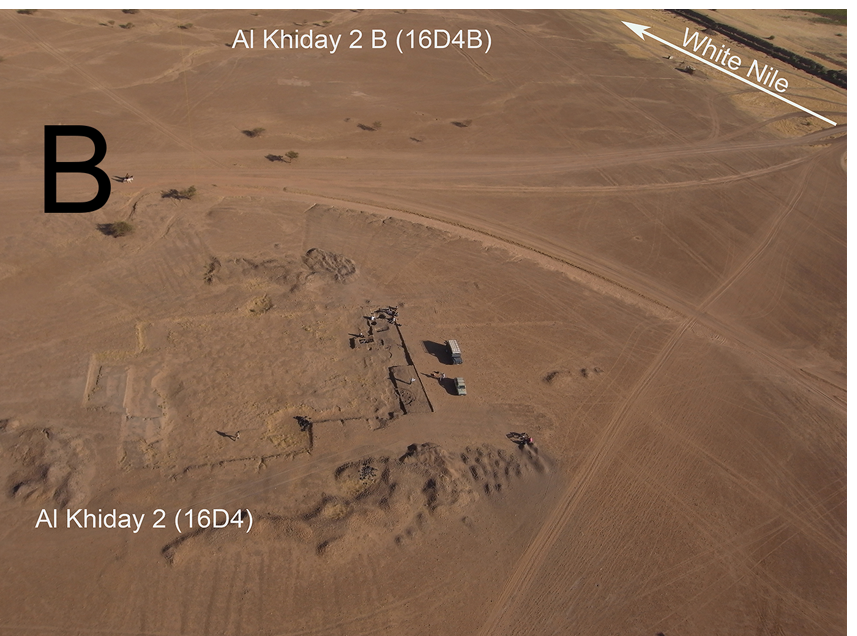
Aerial photograph of the excavation at al-Khiday 2

The cemetery at al-Khiday 2 found no evidence of Mesolithic burials in the mound, however, evidence demonstrates the fact that a Mesolithic group deliberately placed base camps on tops of ridges such as this one since at that time it would have been surrounded by seasonal flood-fed swamps. This establishment is what introduced the start of the accumulation of living floors on the site, the Mesolithic occupation as known know can be dated to around 6700 - 6300 cal years BC.

Within the Mesolithic deposits around 90% is found to be fish, this is assumed to tie into the Mesolithic base camps close association with the flood-swamps, easy access to the Nile, and other productive aquatic habitats such as Jebel Baroka Lake. The most commonly identified aquatic species in the deposits is that of the Clarrid Catfish, which is a shallow water fish which lived within the shores of the Nile and the flooded swamps nearby. Along with fish, mollusk shells and freshwater turtles were found, and in terms of non aquatic animals, small evidence for stork, geese and duck were discovered. The mammalian taxa contained a very diverse collection of animals which imply a lush Savannah environment, the main one being a large collection of Antelopes, but also baboon, hare, warthog and the rare large mammal; elephant, rhinoceros and hippopotamus.

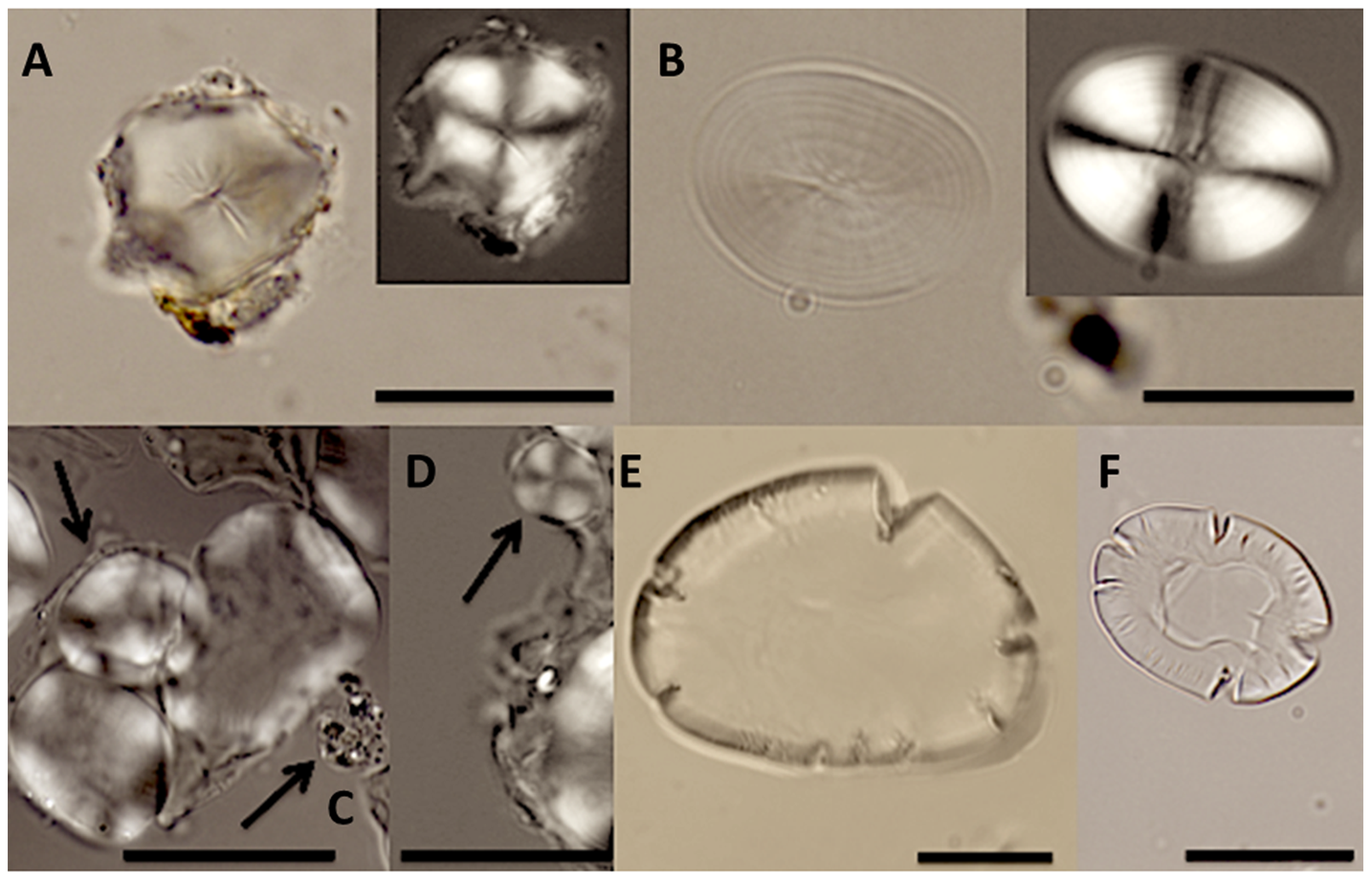
Examples of starch granules found in dental analysis used for dietary exploration

Within the Mesolithic small starch granules, plant fibers and micro-charcoal were found, the granules were small and displayed no signs of damage. This is estimated to be indicative of little to no external processing, such as heating, presence of water or roasting, they were most likely ingested raw.

To greater determine diet the information gathered through the zooarchaeological record and lipid analysis of found pottery was used, these concentrations of lipids on vessels indicated that either plants or low lipid-yielding animal products were being processed in the vessels. The vessels were also found with a large accumulation of leaf or stem epicuticular waxes and a high abundance of diacids, more specifically cutin and suberin. The presence of these displays evidence that underground storage organs such as tubers were most likely processed in these vessels during the Mesolithic.

These vessels saw no evidence that any aquatic products were cooked or processed and very little evidence of any ruminants within the analysis, despite most of the taxa from the deposits being either aquatic or ruminant, implying much more plant usage, of the 22 lipid-yielding vessels eight were ever used to process animal products and of those only three were solely for animal processes.

The pottery found in association with the Mesolithic findings contained a wide variety of decorations: incised wavy line, dotted wavy line, "lunula-shaped", alternately pivoting stamp, rocker stamp drops, rocker stamp drops deep, rocker stamp dotted zigzag, rocker stamp plain zigzag

Optical Microscopy determined three types of paste at the al-Khiday sites, two of which are associated with the Mesolithic with no exceptions; Alkati-Felspar and Quartz-rich [117 samples] and Quartz Sand-rich [185 samples]. Image analysis of these three groups also found that, based on abundance, size and grain size distribution of inclusions, there was no substation difference between the two groups aforementioned associated with the Mesolithic

== Neolithic ==
At the site of al-Khiday 2 there are around 32 Neolithic burials which mark the movement of Neolithic peoples here following the base camps of the Mesolithic occupation, this occupation induces the beginning of the degradation of the Pre-Mesolithic graves. Many of the Neolithic burials are with burial goods such as Shaheinab Pottery and other datable material, they resemble many other ritualistic burials of the other cemeteries in Sudan from this time. It is estimated that the Neolithic occupation at this site lasted from around 4550 - 4250 cal years BC.

The starch granules found which associated to this time period were all fairly large (~25mm) with no small ones present, the ones that were seen demonstrated alterations which resembled the possibility of heating. Many were cracked placing the theory that they were either ground or allowed to roast in dry heat.

The Neolithic time period also displayed the largest percentage of "char" on dental analysis associated with cooking and smoke compared to the other two periods.

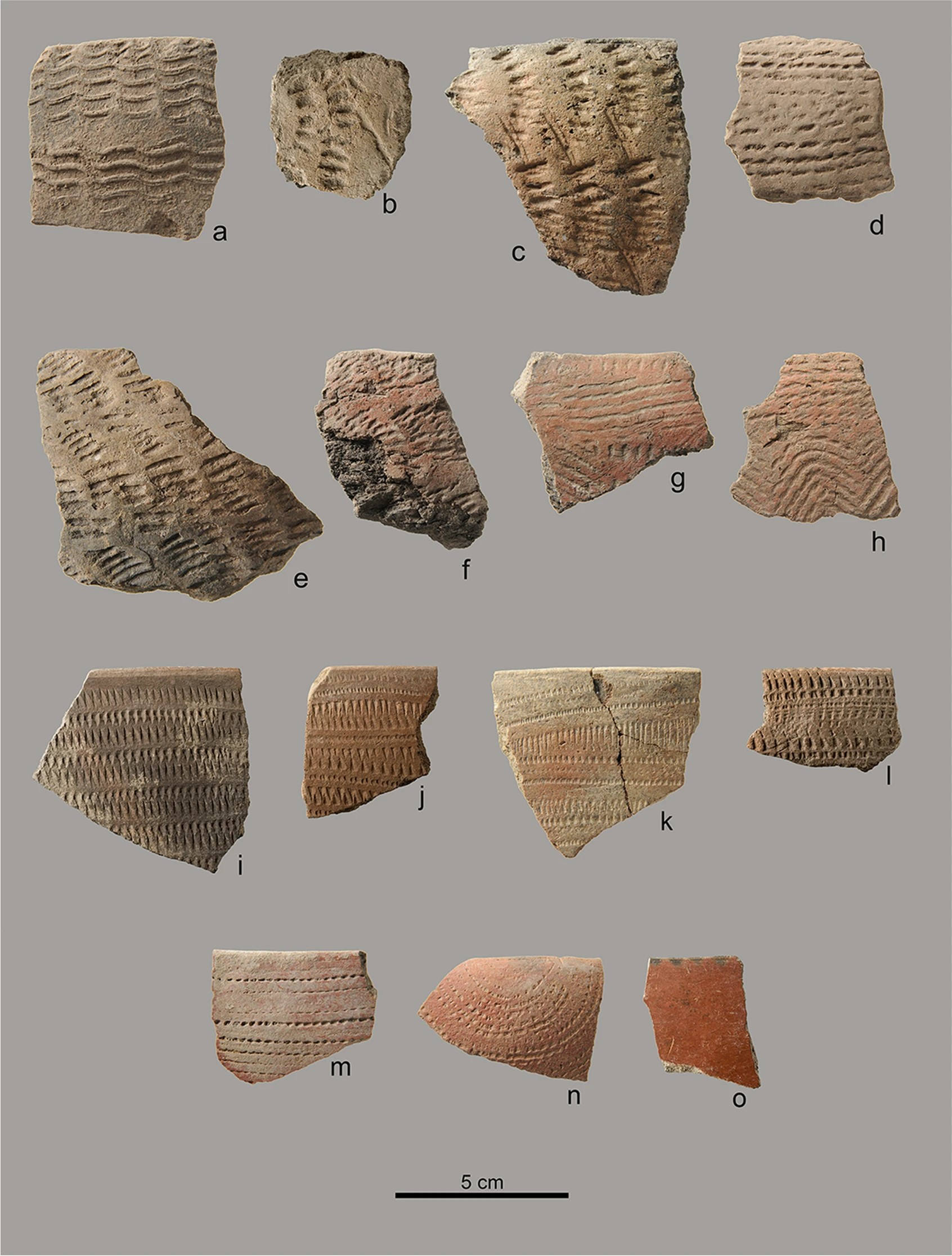
Collection of pottery sherds which yielded lipids

The deposits associated with this range saw a much smaller and more poorly preserved collection with the most significant finds being that of giraffe, antelope and some evidence of domesticates. There was also a lack of fish remains in the deposit with the most common one being that of the common Nile perch. The vessels found indicated evidence of use for carcass and plant production as well as some minor dairy exploitation, the residual analysis also saw much more ruminant animal production (it is unsure if domesticated or not).

The vessels, as in the Mesolithic, contained a variety of decorations with some carrying on from the Mesolithic: burnishing, linear horizontal incisions, rocker stamp dotted zigzag, rocker stamp evenly spaced dots, rocker stamp unevenly spaced dots, horizontal dotted lines with alternately pivoting stamp technique, semi-circular concentric dotted line, scraping, incised fish scale, and black rimmed

The paste group which was found through Optical Microscopy for the Neolithic was Fine sand-sized quartz-rich with around 58 samples, it was also confirmed to be different in abundance, size and grain size distribution of inclusions, through image analysis than the two groups associated with the Mesolithic. There were again no exceptions.

== Meroitic ==
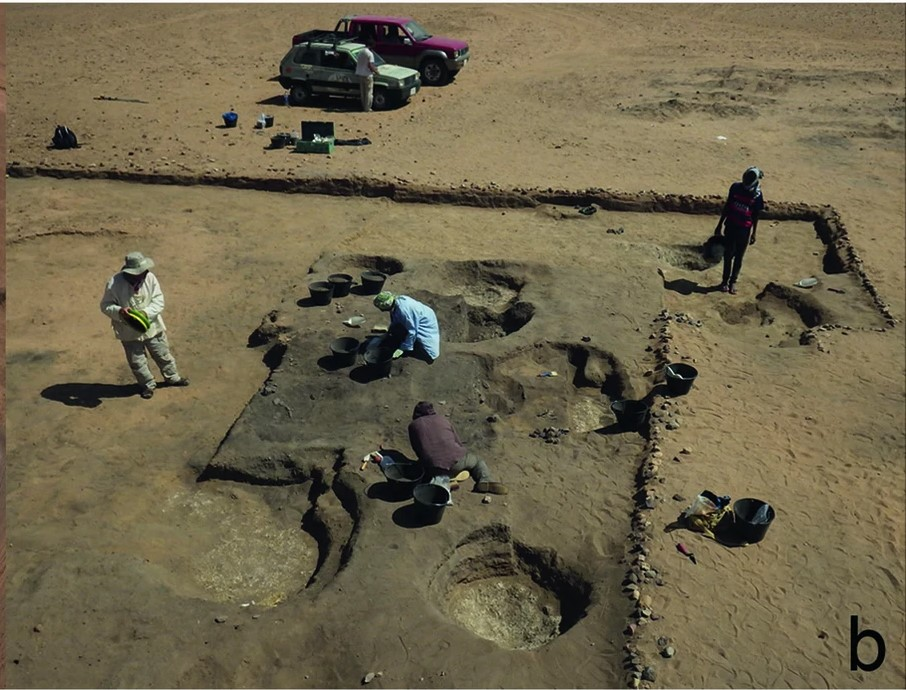
Image of the excavation process in uncovering the various burials

Within the excavations 43 Meroitic graves were identified, these were deep graves which interrupted other burial phases and features. Among these 43 graves 3 distinct types were determined; the most common being a rectangular shaft that was dug east–west. The second most common was very similar to the prior, however it also contained a circular chamber on the west side. The final was one additional irregular/circular shaft burial on the southern side, it was the only one found but the fireplace C-14 dates attributes it to the same time period. The bodies found were oriented west with their faces turned north, traces of botanical remains were found above and below indicating mats surrounding them. There was no true pattern in spatial distribution of age, sex or gender except for a concentration of infant and children burials in the northeastern sector and an increase in burial goods within rounded graves. The grave goods found included 12 ceramic pots which were handmade and sand and straw tempered, these were buried with anklets, necklaces and other ornaments along with one iron arrowhead under the skull of a 10-year-old child. The adults were found with the larger vessels, however, two small feeding cups were found with infant burials. The investigations into the bodies found indicated that there was low dental caries, showing a low carbohydrate diet or plants which inhibit dental caries, there was also a high calculus rate which points to a protein diet. The studies also found indication of stress during childhood and evidence of healed injuries.

== Cyperus rotundus ==
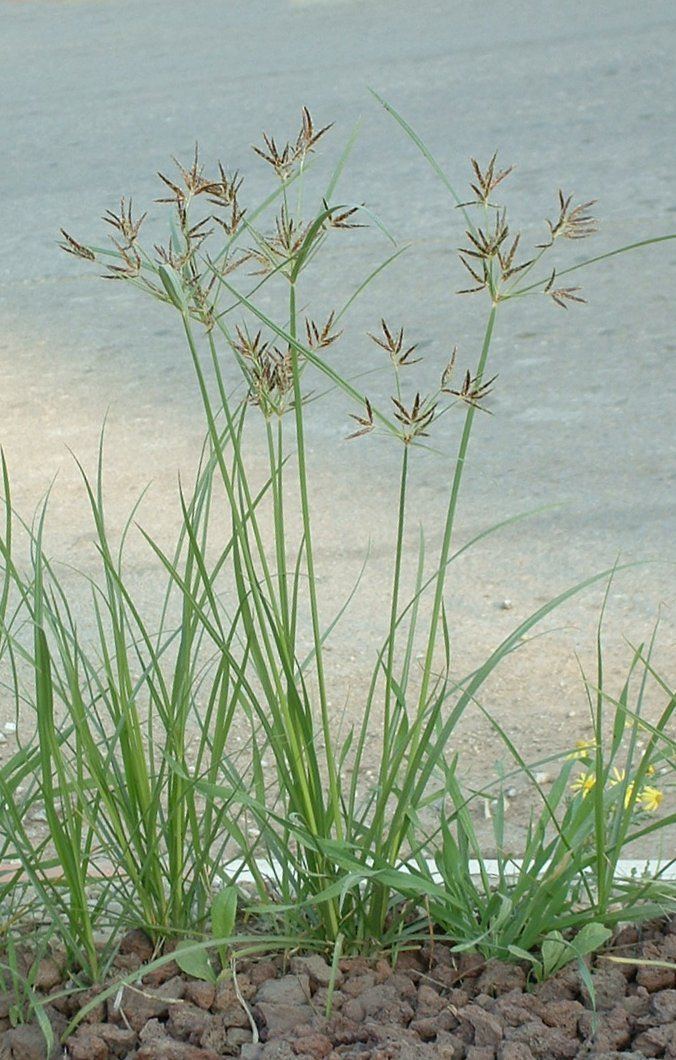
Image of purple nut sedge

Cyperus rotundus, also known as purple nut sedge, is present within all periods. It is a tuberous plant which was very widespread throughout Africa especially near the Nile rivers, it excels at quickly spreading and thriving in these environments. No true evidence of the plant was found within the burials of the three periods, as it is very difficult to find preserved, however, was considered a staple of diets through associated communities and proxy evidence found. Chewing on purple nut sedge inhibits Streptococcus mutans, during the dental calculus analysis there was an exceptionally low quantity of this bacteria found indicating a potential correlation between the two. It is questioned why the consumption would have continued into the Neolithic and Meroitic periods where better C3 plants were present. One theory is the fact that as a tuber, purple nut sedge is not only nutritional and abundant, but also medicinal as described in various Grecian medical writings.
