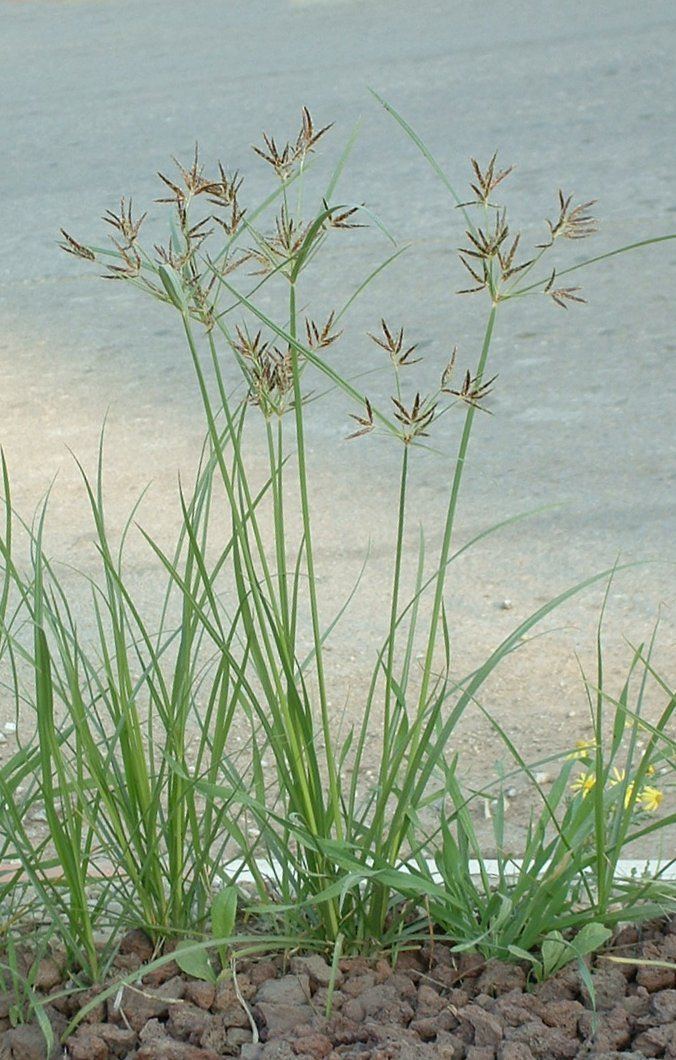

Conservation status
- Least Concern (IUCN 3.1)

Scientific classification
- Kingdom: Plantae
- Clade: Embryophytes
- Clade: Tracheophytes
- Clade: Spermatophytes
- Clade: Angiosperms
- Clade: Monocots
- Clade: Commelinids
- Order: Poales
- Family: Cyperaceae
- Genus: Cyperus
- Species: C. rotundus

Binomial name
- Cyperus rotundus L.

= Cyperus rotundus =

Species of plant

Cyperus rotundus (coco-grass, Java grass, nut grass, purple nut sedge or purple nutsedge, red nut sedge, Khmer kravanh chruk) is a species of sedge (Cyperaceae) native to Africa, southern and central Europe (north to France and Austria), and southern Asia. The word cyperus derives from the Greek κύπερος, kyperos, and rotundus is from Latin, meaning "round". The earliest attested form of the word cyperus is the Mycenaean Greek 𐀓𐀞𐀫, ku-pa-ro, written in Linear B syllabic script.

== Description ==
Cyperus rotundus is a perennial plant, that may reach a height of up to 140 cm (55 in). The names "nut grass" and "nut sedge" – shared with the related species Cyperus esculentus – are derived from its tubers, that somewhat resemble nuts, although botanically they have nothing to do with nuts.

As in other Cyperaceae, the leaves sprout in ranks of three from the base of the plant, around 5–20 cm (2–8 in) long. The flower stems have a triangular cross-section. The flower is bisexual and has three stamina and a three-stigma pistil, with the inflorescence having three to eight unequal spikes. The fruit is a three-angled achene.

Young plants initially form white, fleshy rhizomes, up to 25 mm (1.0 in) in dimension, in chains. Some rhizomes grow upward in the soil, then form a bulb-like structure from which new shoots and roots grow, and from the new roots, new rhizomes grow. Other rhizomes grow horizontally or downward, and form dark reddish-brown tubers or chains of tubers.

=== Similar species ===
C. esculentus – is visually similar but has yellow to bright-yellow florets (lacking the darkened reddish colour of C. rotundus' inflorescence, which can be a bit greenish-pallid without), often arranged in a ladder-like way.

C. longus – has leaves that sheath the stem and diverge from some way up the stem, and is invariably a rather larger plant.

C. serotinus – also has leaves that sheath the stem and diverge from some way up the stem, and has the spikes of flowers with the spikelets separated in a ladder-like way.

== History ==
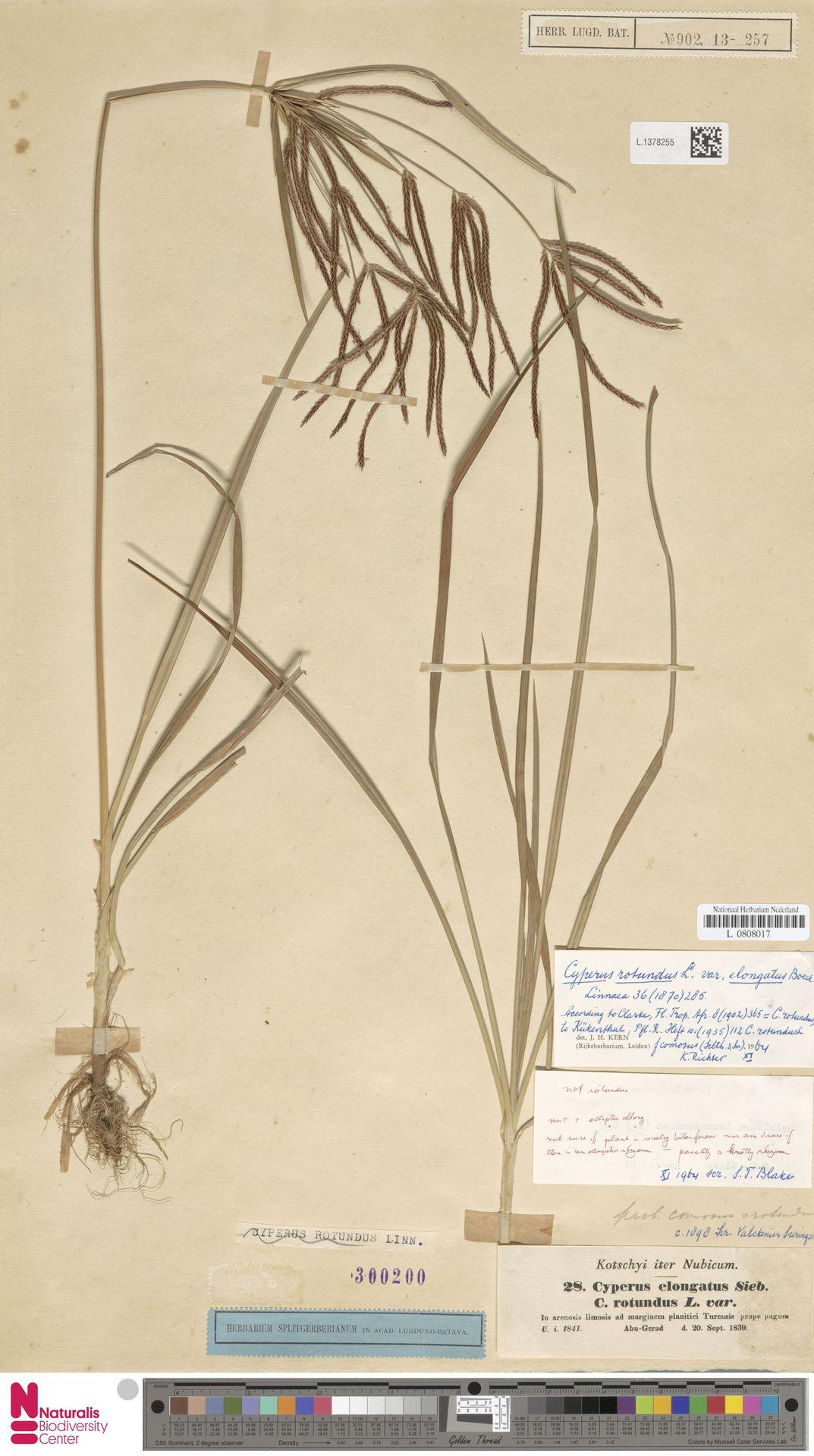
Cyperus rotundus L. subsp. rotundus, herbarium specimen isotype, 1839

C. rotundus was part of a set of starchy tuberous sedges that may have been eaten by Pliocene hominins. Biomarkers and microscopic evidence of C. rotundus are present in human dental calculus found at the Al Khiday archaeological complex in central Sudan dating from before 6700 BC to the Meroitic pre-Islamic Kingdom of 300–400 AD. It is suggested that C. rotundus consumption may have contributed to the relatively low frequency of dental caries among the Meroitic population of Al Khiday because of its ability to inhibit Streptococcus mutans.

C. rotundus was employed in ancient Egypt, Mycenean Greece, and elsewhere as an aromatic and to purify water. It was used by ancient Greek physicians Theophrastus, Pliny the Elder, and Dioscorides as both medicine and perfume.

== Ecology ==
It prefers dry conditions, but will tolerate moist soils, and often grows in wastelands and in crop fields.

The tubers are an important nutritional source of minerals and trace elements for migrating cranes.

== Uses ==
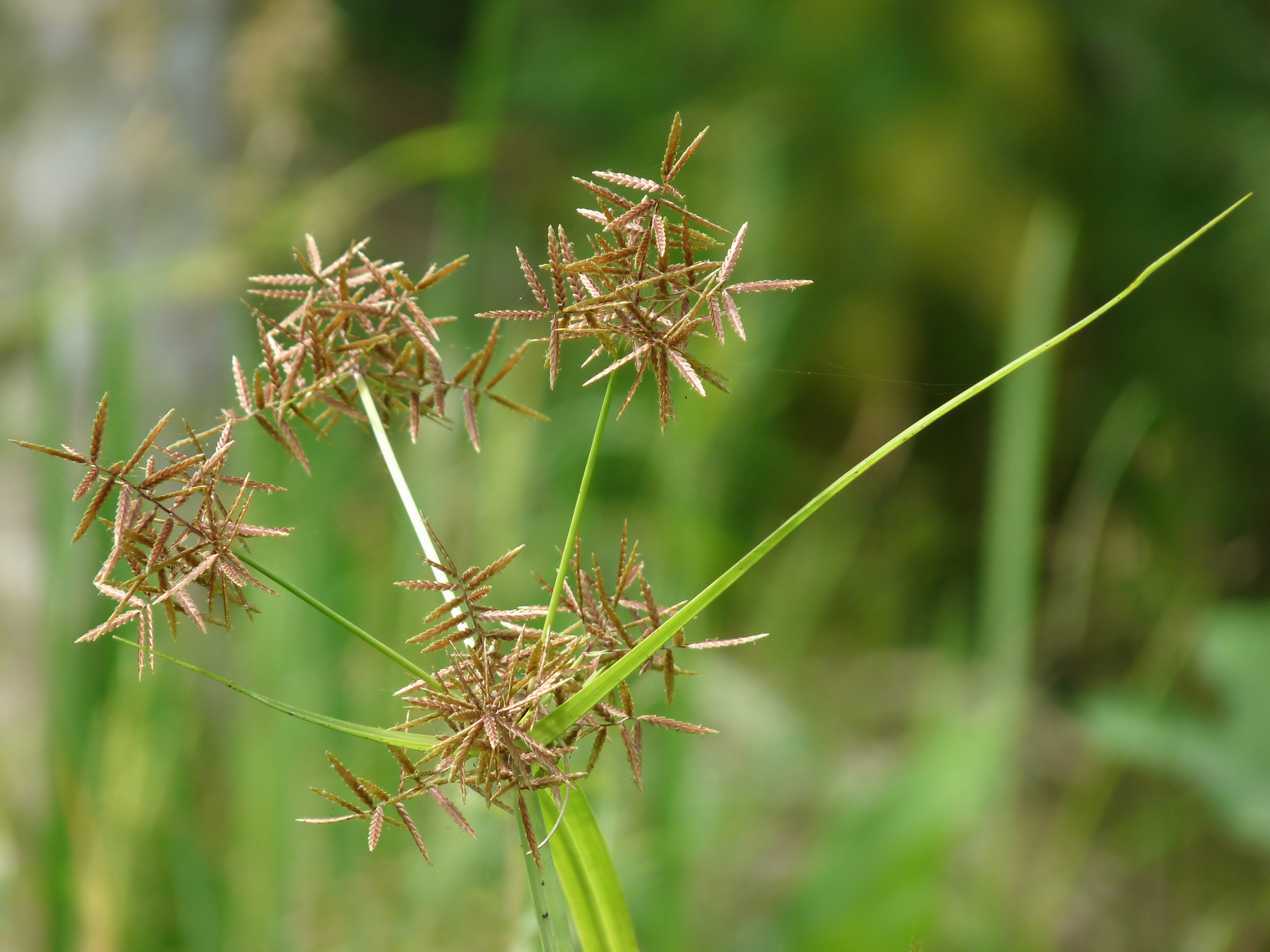
Cyperus rotundus inflorescence, Kerala

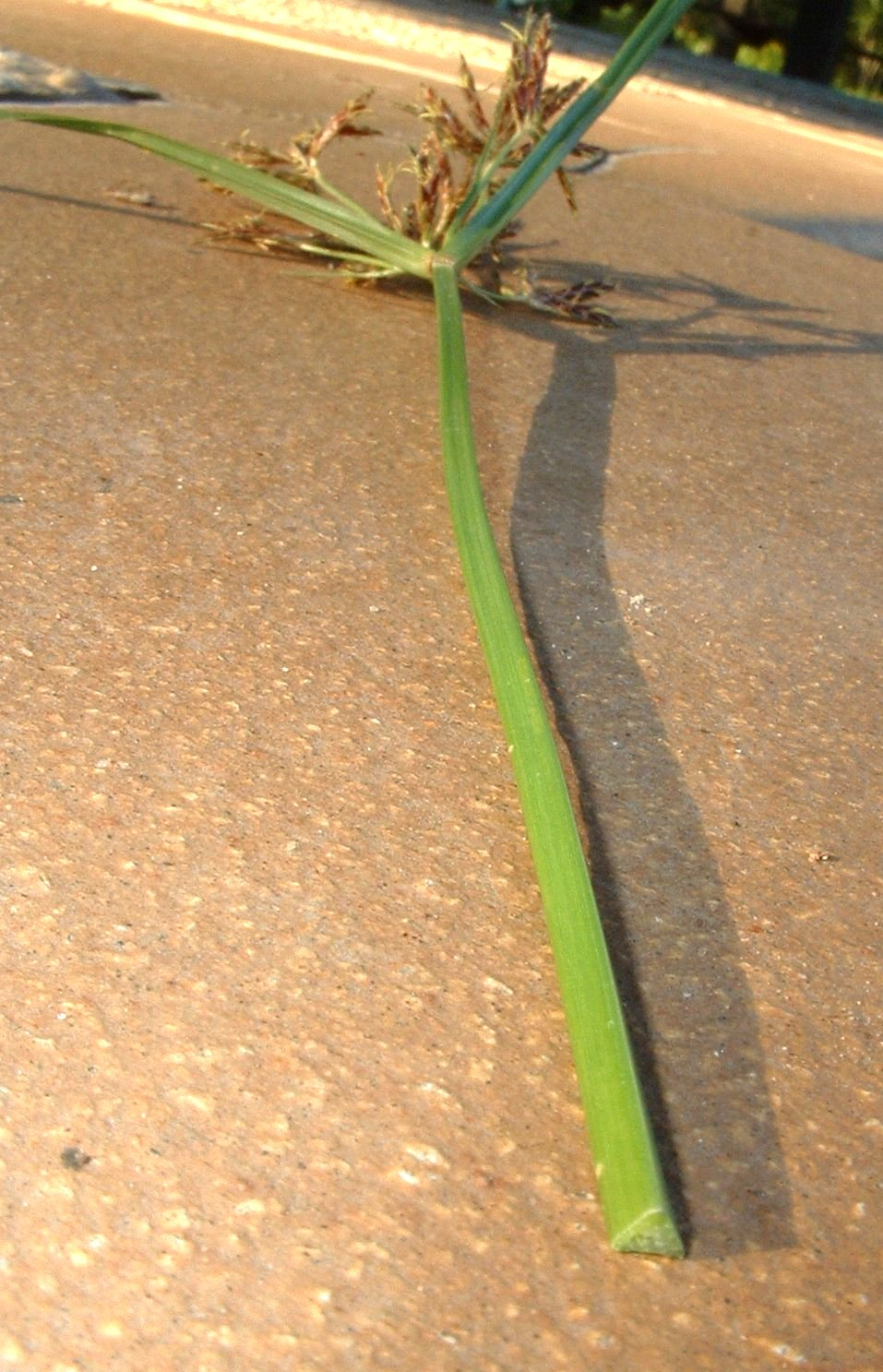
Flower stem showing triangular cross-section

C. rotundus has many beneficial uses. It is a staple carbohydrate in tropical regions for modern hunter-gatherers and is a famine food in some agrarian cultures.

=== Folk medicine ===
In traditional Chinese medicine, C. rotundus is considered the primary qi-regulating herb.

The plant is mentioned in the ancient Indian ayurvedic medicine Charaka Samhita (circa 100 AD). Modern ayurvedic medicine uses the plant, known as musta or musta moola churna, for fevers, digestive system disorders, dysmenorrhea, and other maladies.

Ayurvedic physicians use the plant for medicinal purposes in treating fevers, digestive system disorders, dysmenorrhea and other maladies. Modern alternative medicine recommends using the plant to treat nausea, fever and inflammation; for pain reduction; for muscle relaxation and for many other disorders.

Arabs of the Levant traditionally use roasted tubers, while they are still hot, or hot ashes from burned tubers, for wounds, bruises, and carbuncles. Western and Islamic herbalists including Dioscorides, Galen, Serapion, Paulus Aegineta, Avicenna, Rhazes, and Charles Alston have described its use as a stomachic, emmenagogue, and deobstruent, and in emollient plasters.

The antibacterial properties of the tubers may have helped prevent tooth decay in people who lived in Sudan 2000 years ago. Less than 1% of that local population's teeth had cavities, abscesses, or other signs of tooth decay, though those people were probably farmers (early farmers' teeth typically had more tooth decay than those of hunter-gatherers because the high grain content in their diet created a hospitable environment for bacteria that flourish in the human mouth, excreting acids that eat away at the teeth).

=== Modern uses and studies ===
Several chemical substances have been identified in C. rotundus: cadalene, cyprotene, flavonoids, sesquiterpenes, terpenoids, mustakone, isocyperol, α-cyperone, rotundene, valencene, kaempferol, luteolin, quercetin, patchoulenone, isopatchoulenone, sugeonyl acetate, cellulose triacetate and sugebiol. A sesquiterpene, rotundone, so called because it was originally extracted from the tuber of this plant, is responsible for the spicy aroma of black pepper and the peppery taste of certain Australian Shiraz wines.

Extract from leaves and tubers of Cyperus rotundus increase the adventitious rooting of different species. These extracts contain a large amount of auxins and phenolic compounds that promote the rooting of cuttings and seedlings.

=== Food ===
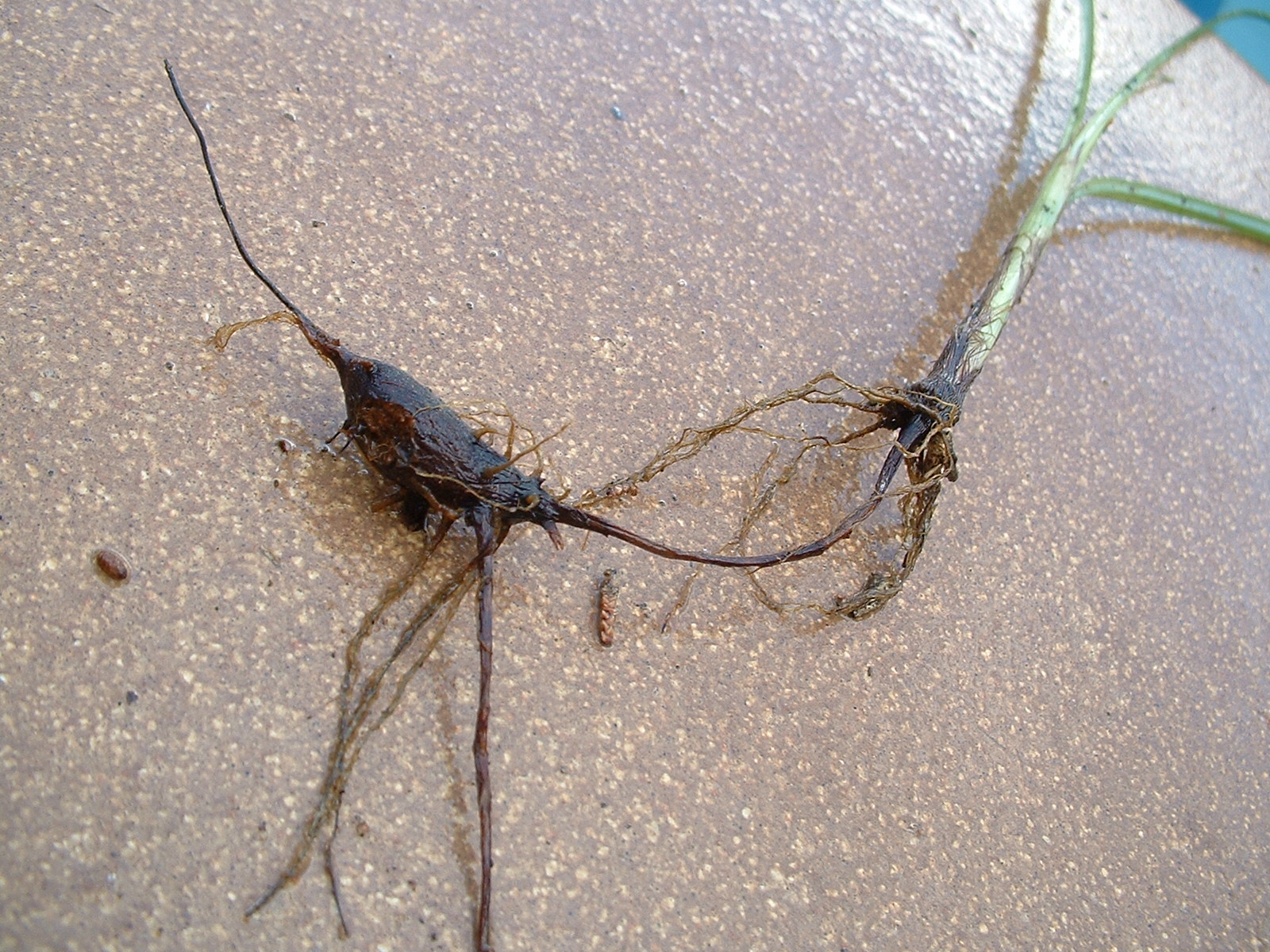
A Cyperus rotundus tuber, approximately 20 mm long

Despite the bitter taste of the tubers, they are edible and have nutritional value. Some part of the plant was eaten by humans between Mesolithic and Neolithic periods. The plant has a high amount of carbohydrates. The plant is eaten in Rajasthan in famine-stricken areas.

=== Sleeping mats ===
Dried coco grass is used in mats for sleeping.

== Invasive problems and eradication ==
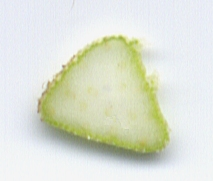
A cross section through the flower stem

Cyperus rotundus is one of the most invasive weeds known, having spread out to a worldwide distribution in tropical and temperate regions. It has been called "the world's worst weed" as it is known as a weed in over 90 countries, and infests over 50 crops worldwide. In the United States it occurs from Florida north to New York and Minnesota and west to California and most of the states in between. In the uplands of Cambodia, it is described as an important agricultural weed.

Its existence in a field significantly reduces crop yield, both because it is a tough competitor for ground resources, and because it is allelopathic, the roots releasing substances harmful to other plants. Similarly, it also has a bad effect on ornamental gardening. The difficulty to control it is a result of its extensive system of underground tubers, and its resistance to most herbicides. It is also one of the few weeds that cannot be stopped with plastic mulch.

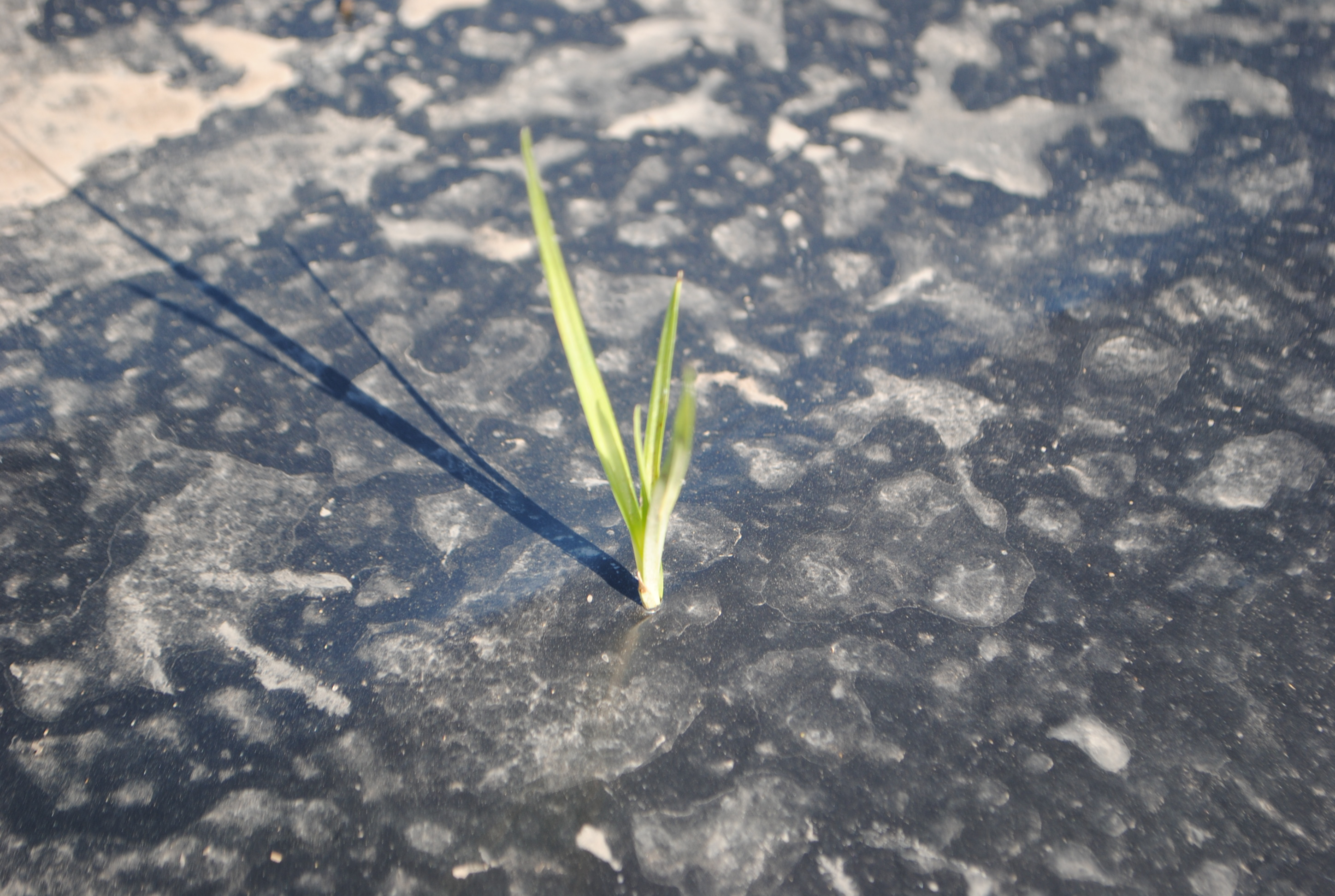
Cyperus rotundus emerging through plastic mulching

Weed pulling in gardens usually results in breakage of roots, leaving tubers in the ground from which new plants emerge quickly. Ploughing distributes the tubers in the field, worsening the infestation; even if the plough cuts up the tubers to pieces, new plants can still grow from them. In addition, the tubers can survive harsh conditions, further contributing to the difficulty to eradicate the plant. Hoeing in traditional agriculture of Southeast Asia does not remove the plant but leads to rapid regrowth.

Most herbicides may kill the plant's leaves, but most have no effect on the root system and the tubers. Glyphosate will kill some of the tubers (along with most other plants) and repeated application can be successful. Halosulfuron-methyl will control nut grass after repeated applications without damaging lawns. The plant does not tolerate shading and 2,4-dichlorophenoxyacetic acid (2,4-D) slows its growth in pastures and mulch crops.

In various countries, particularly in Southeast Asia, Cyperus rotundus is considered an invasive species. Its capability to adapt to a wide range of environmental conditions, along with its aggressive growth habit and prolific reproduction, makes it a problematic weed in agricultural and non-agricultural lands.

In Southeast Asia, including Indonesia, Malaysia, and the Philippines, Cyperus rotundus is a common invasive species in crops, plantations, gardens, and along roadsides. Its presence can significantly reduce crop yields and make cultivation more challenging. The weed competes with crops for nutrients, light, and space, and is difficult to eradicate once established. Similarly, in Thailand, it invades agricultural areas, especially rice paddies, sugarcane fields, and vegetable gardens, causing substantial economic losses. Its tubers can survive under harsh conditions, making control and eradication efforts difficult. The weed's resilience to common herbicides and its ability to spread rapidly through both seeds and underground tubers contribute to its invasive status.

== See also ==
- List of Cyperus species
