= Rotundone =

Names
- IUPAC name Guaia-1(5),11-dien-2-one
- Systematic IUPAC name (3S,5R,8S)-3,8-Dimethyl-5-(prop-1-en-2-yl)-3,4,5,6,7,8-hexahydroazulen-1(2H)-one

Identifiers
CAS Number	18374-76-0
3D model (JSmol)	Interactive image
ChemSpider	4478902
PubChem CID	5321003
UNII	U33H52BQ0P
CompTox Dashboard (EPA)	DTXSID301030485
- InChI: InChI=1S/C15H22O/c1-9(2)12-6-5-10(3)15-13(8-12)11(4)7-14(15)16/h10-12H,1,5-8H2,2-4H3/t10-,11-,12+/m0/s1 Key: NUWMTBMCSQWPDG-SDDRHHMPSA-N; InChI=1/C15H22O/c1-9(2)12-6-5-10(3)15-13(8-12)11(4)7-14(15)16/h10-12H,1,5-8H2,2-4H3/t10-,11-,12+/m0/s1 Key: NUWMTBMCSQWPDG-SDDRHHMPBR
- SMILES: O=C1\C2=C(/[C@H](C1)C)C[C@H](\C(=C)C)CC[C@@H]2C

Properties
Chemical formula	C_{15}H_{22}O
Molar mass	218.340 g·mol^{−1}
- Except where otherwise noted, data are given for materials in their standard state (at 25 °C [77 °F], 100 kPa). Infobox references

Rotundone is a sesquiterpene originally discovered in the tubers of Java grass (Cyperus rotundus). Rotundone is also present in the essential oils of black pepper, marjoram, oregano, rosemary, basil, thyme, and geranium, as well as in some Syrah wines. It imparts a peppery aroma.
