= Mustakone =

Names
- IUPAC name 1,5-dimethyl-8-propan-2-yltricyclo[4.4.0.0^{2,7}]dec-4-en-3-one
- Other names 3-Copaen-2-one

Identifiers
CAS Number	1209-91-2
3D model (JSmol)	Interactive image
ChEBI	CHEBI:66416
ChemSpider	28639001
PubChem CID	12313013
CompTox Dashboard (EPA)	DTXSID501318673
- InChI: InChI=1S/C15H22O/c1-8(2)10-5-6-15(4)13-9(3)7-11(16)14(15)12(10)13/h7-8,10,12-14H,5-6H2,1-4H3 Key: CTFSUCDHRVDRKG-UHFFFAOYSA-N
- SMILES: CC1=CC(=O)C2C3C1C2(CCC3C(C)C)C

Properties
Chemical formula	C_{15}H_{22}O
Molar mass	218.340 g·mol^{−1}
Boiling point	128-129 °C
Solubility	Soluble in cyclohexane

Related compounds
Related compounds	Copaene
- Except where otherwise noted, data are given for materials in their standard state (at 25 °C [77 °F], 100 kPa). Infobox references

Mustakone is a tricylic sesquiterpenoid with the chemical formula C_{15}H_{22}O. It is named after the plant it was first extracted from Cyperus rotundus, which had the common name "mustuka" in Hindi. Mustakone can be found in a variety of plants and their oils like Myrcia sylvatica, Cyperus articulatus, and Hymenaea courbaril.
