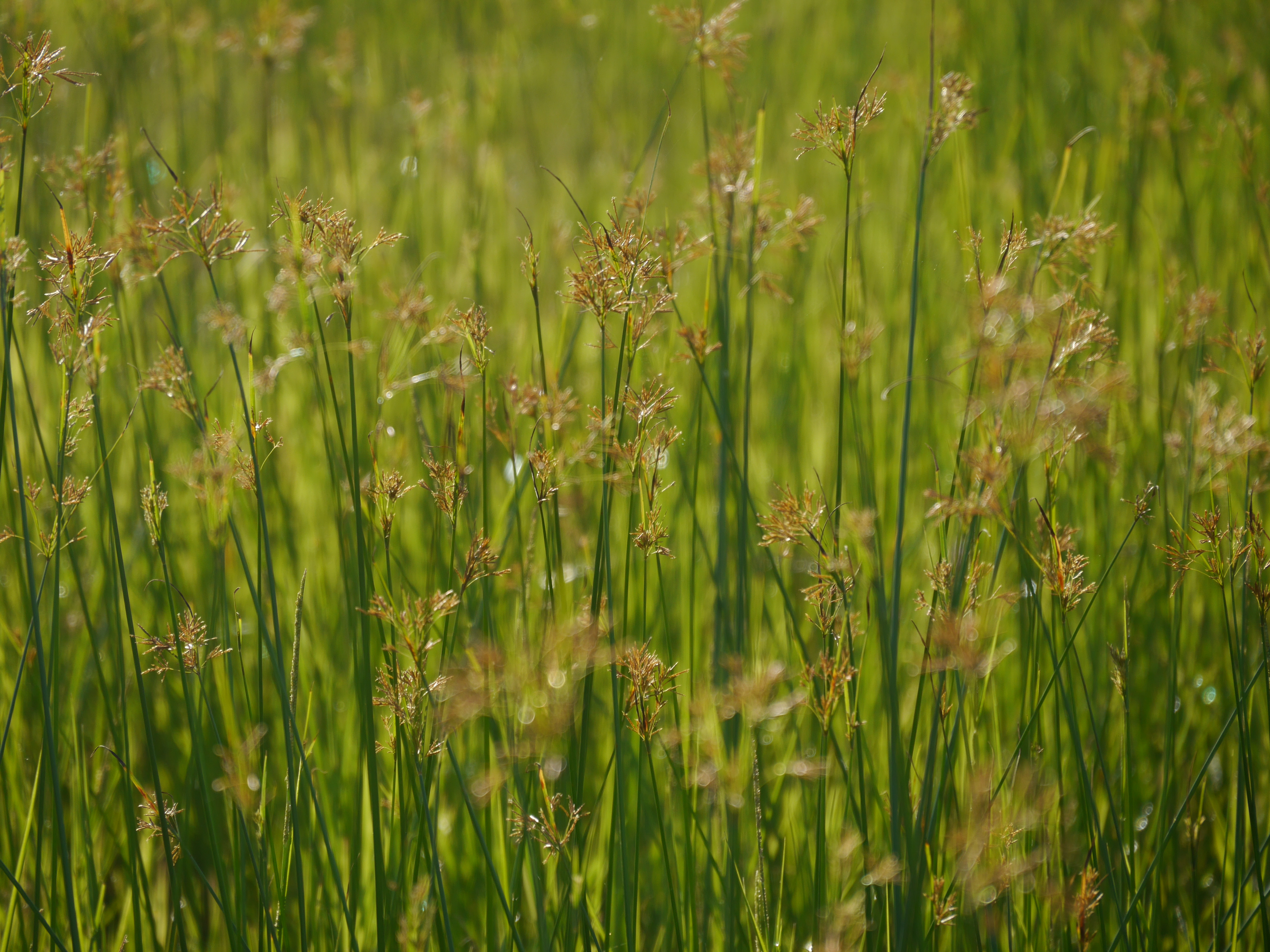

Scientific classification
- Kingdom: Plantae
- Clade: Tracheophytes
- Clade: Angiosperms
- Clade: Monocots
- Clade: Commelinids
- Order: Poales
- Family: Cyperaceae
- Genus: Cyperus
- Species: C. corymbosus

Binomial name
- Cyperus corymbosus Rottb.

= Cyperus corymbosus =

Species of sedge

Cyperus corymbosus is a species of sedge that is endemic to parts of South America, Africa, the Middle East and western Asia.

The species was first formally described by the botanist Christen Friis Rottbøll in 1772.

== See also ==
- List of Cyperus species
