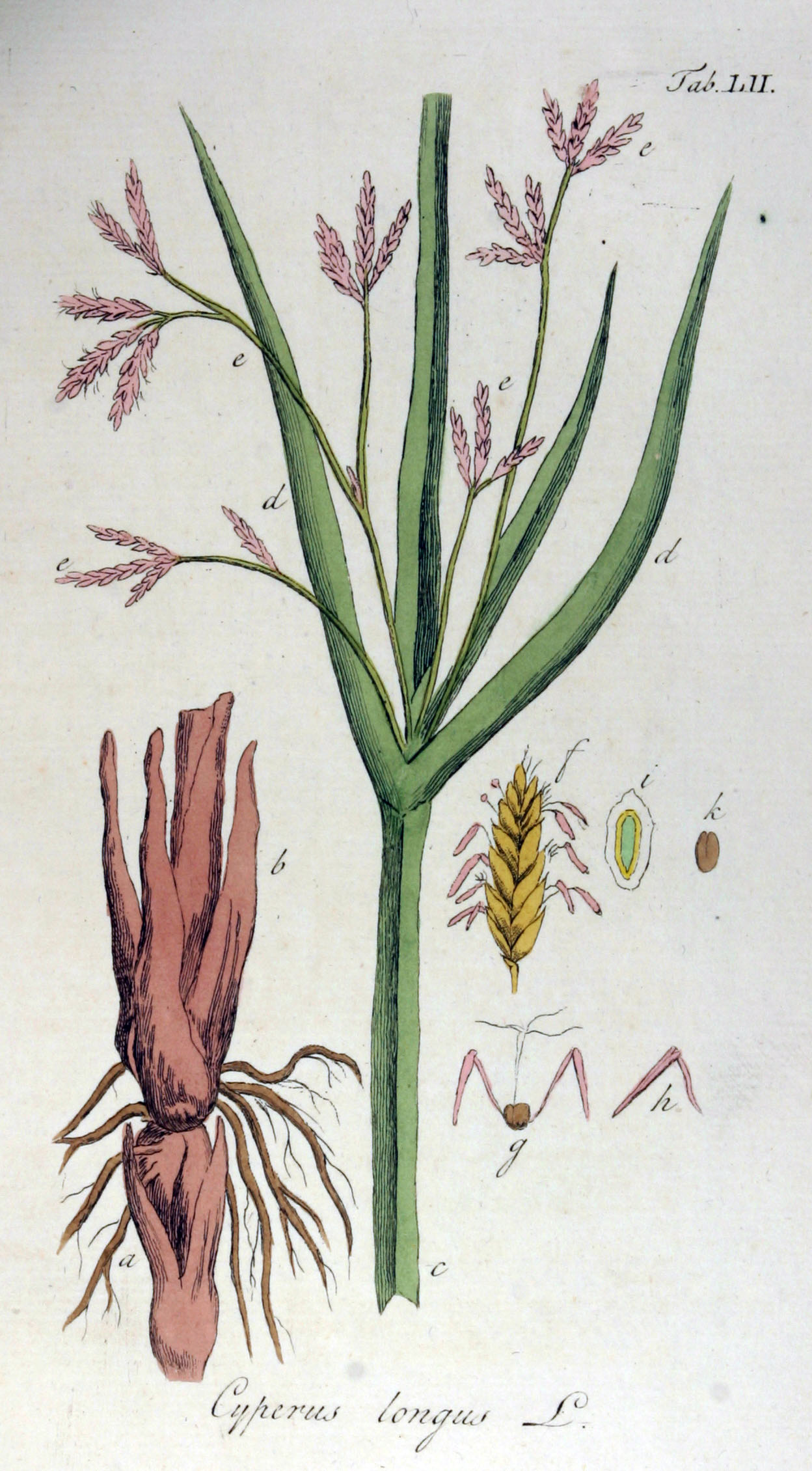

Scientific classification
- Kingdom: Plantae
- Clade: Tracheophytes
- Clade: Angiosperms
- Clade: Monocots
- Clade: Commelinids
- Order: Poales
- Family: Cyperaceae
- Genus: Cyperus
- Species: C. longus

Binomial name
- Cyperus longus L.

= Cyperus longus =

Galingale

Species of plant

Cyperus longus is a species of sedge known by the common names of sweet cyperus and water rush in Africa, or in Britain galingale (a variant name of galangal, an unrelated plant).

== Description ==
It is a tall plant, growing up to one metre (3 ft 3 in) in height, with creeping rhizomes and erect, triangular stems, each terminating in an inflorescence. The species grows in shallow water or on damp ground, such as at pond edges.

The holotype was collected in Italy.

== Distribution ==
It is a widespread species found across Africa, southern Europe, the Indian subcontinent and western Asia. It incidentally occurs in Wallonia as a native. It is also found in western France, south Wales and southern England, where it may or not originally be native. It has recently (since the 1990s) spread northwards to Flanders and the Netherlands where it occurs in scattered adventive populations. It has also been introduced to Tristan da Cunha and Western Australia.

== Subspecies ==
Cyperus longus L. subsp. longus - the typical subspecies. Loose inflorescence with numerous (2–10) elongated rays (to 35 cm), very uneven, the most elongated bearing inflorescences with rays extending far beyond the median cluster ("épi"). Spikelets 4-25(60) mm. Glumes usually red, with a well-developed hyaline margin.

Cyperus longus subsp. badius (Desf.) Bonnier & Layens - Inflorescence tighter, with few (2–5) short rays (to 5 cm rarely more, not exceeding the median cluster ("épi")), less uneven, heads often quite compact. Spikelets 4–12 mm. Glumes usually somewhat brownish with no or poorly developed hyaline margin, with a similar distribution.

== Uses ==
The thick, long, yellowish rhizomes of these plants are traditionally harvested to distil a sweet-scented oil which is used in the perfume industry. The stalks were formerly traditionally processed into paper. There were also folk medicines made from this plant in Europe, the rhizomes being used for stomach aches and the onset of dropsy. It is used at present as an ornamental plant, used for lining ponds.

== See also ==
- List of Cyperus species
