= Johann Otto Boeckeler =

German apothecary-botanist (1803–1899)

Johann Otto Boeckeler (12 August 1803 – 5 March 1899) was a German apothecary-botanist of Oldenburg. He specialized in the plant family Cyperaceae (sedges), of which, he was the binomial authority of many species.

He is commemorated with the genus Boeckeleria and the species Bulbostylis boeckeleriana.

== Publications ==
- Botanik; edited with Paul Friedrich August Ascherson and others (1879), part of Karl Klaus von der Decken's "Reisen in Ost-Afrika", etc. Bd. 3. Abt. 3.
- Die Cyperaceen des Königlichen Herbariums zu Berlin, Linnaea; Vol. XXXV - XLI, (1900) - Cyperaceae of the Royal Herbariums of Berlin.
