= Calendula maroccana =

Scientific classification
- Kingdom: Plantae
- Clade: Tracheophytes
- Clade: Angiosperms
- Clade: Eudicots
- Clade: Asterids
- Order: Asterales
- Family: Asteraceae
- Genus: Calendula
- Species: C. maroccana

Binomial name
- Calendula maroccana Ball, 1893

Species of plant

Calendula maroccana is a species of annual flowering plant in the marigold genus Calendula, family Asteraceae. It grows primarily in a subtropical biome, and is endemic to Morocco.

Calendula maroccana also contains the subspecies Calendula maroccana murbeckii.

== Description ==
C. maroccana is a spreading perennial, non-succulent herb, standing 20cm-40cm high, with glandular hairs. Foliage is green, with massed, yellow flowers peaking in spring and summer but sporadic throughout the year.The leaves are alternate, 2.5-10cm long to 20mm wide, flat, and hairy to rough in texture, with margins mostly wavy and toothed, and tips more or less pointed.

The flower heads, composed of yellow or orange florets with yellow or brown centres, are borne singly at the ends of the stems. They have 2.5–4 cm long outer achenes, 2–2.5 cm long beaks, sometimes crested or toothed. Intermediate achenes are elongated; inner achenes are smaller, curved, with scattered hairs.

Calendula maroccana is similar to Calendula. arvensis, but is distinguished by a more slender habit, and a larger flower with tapered involucral bracts.

== Habitat ==
Calendula maroccana grows best in scrubland, on well-drained, stony ground or sand. It is not considered to be an endangered species.

== Medicinal Use ==
Calendula moroccana contains antioxidant and antibacterial agents that could be used in phytotherapy, pharmaceutical and food sectors.
