= Wild marigold =

Wild marigold is a common name for several plants and may refer to:

- Calendula arvensis, native to central and southern Europe
- Tagetes minuta, native to southern South America
