= Calendula meuselii =

Scientific classification
- Kingdom: Plantae
- Clade: Tracheophytes
- Clade: Angiosperms
- Clade: Eudicots
- Clade: Asterids
- Order: Asterales
- Family: Asteraceae
- Genus: Calendula
- Species: C. meuselii

Binomial name
- Calendula meuselii Ohle

Species of plant

Calendula meuselii, (common name, Meusel marigold) is a species of annual flowering plant in the marigold genus Calendula, family Asteraceae. It is native to and widely distributed across Europe, the Mediterranean to the Sahara and the Arabian Peninsula.

== Description ==
Calendula meuselii is an annual, bushy, non-succulent herb, standing between 50 cm and 1 metre high. Leaves are dark green, alternate, pointed, with glandular hairs. Flower heads are composed of multiple yellow petals and florets, borne singly at the ends of the stems.

== Habitat ==
The native range of this species is the eastern Mediterranean to North Africa, and it has been introduced across North and South America, Eastern Europe and Australia.

C. meuselii grows in readily in ashy, sandy soil and among gravel or in between paving. Concern has been expressed at the damage done by this plant to archaeological sites in Morocco, where it tends to grow between the cracks in paving stones and may cause damage to historic sites.
