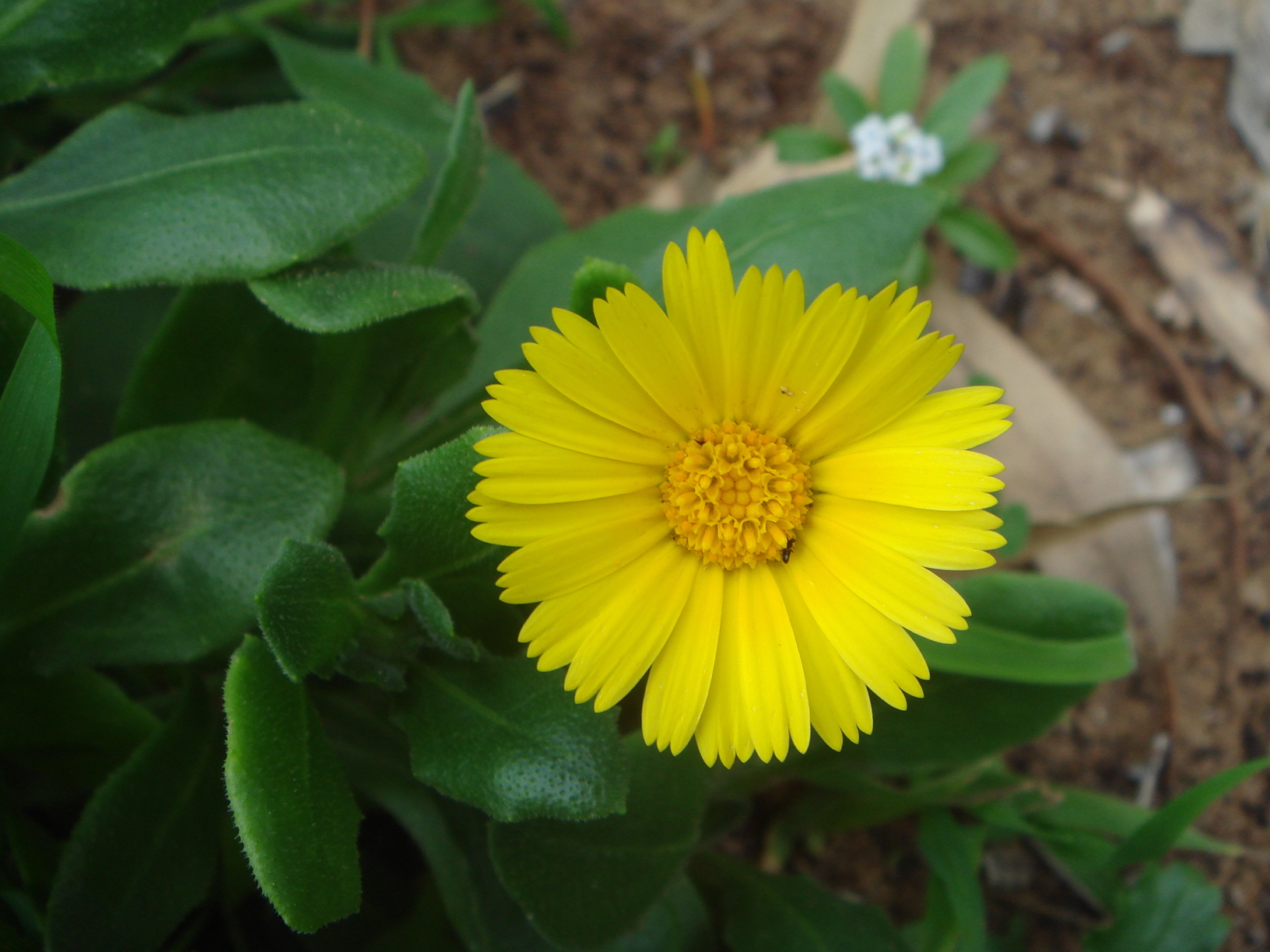

Scientific classification
- Kingdom: Plantae
- Clade: Tracheophytes
- Clade: Angiosperms
- Clade: Eudicots
- Clade: Asterids
- Order: Asterales
- Family: Asteraceae
- Genus: Calendula
- Species: C. suffruticosa

Binomial name
- Calendula suffruticosa Vahl

= Calendula suffruticosa =

Species of plant

Calendula suffruticosa is a species of herb in the family Asteraceae. It has a self-supporting growth form and broad leaves. Flowers are multipellated, and are usually yellow or orange in colour. Individuals can grow up to 40 cm (16 in).

== Subspecies ==
The species is highly variable throughout its range, and multiple subspecies are recognised:

- Calendula suffruticosa subsp. algarbiensis (Boiss.) Nyman: coastal areas from Galicia to western Algarve
- Calendula suffruticosa subsp. balansae (Boiss. & Reut.) Ohle: Algeria
- Calendula suffruticosa subsp. boissieri Lanza: North Africa
- Calendula suffruticosa subsp. carbonellii Lanza: southern Iberian Peninsula, in coastal cliffs between Gibraltar and Málaga
- Calendula suffruticosa subsp. cinerea (Ohle) P.Silveira & A.C.Gonç.: Cape Saint Vincent, Portugal
- Calendula suffruticosa subsp. fulgida (Raf.) Guadagno: Italy, Malta and Turkey
- Calendula suffruticosa subsp. greuteri Ohle: endemic to Andalusia
- Calendula suffruticosa subsp. lusitanica (Boiss.) Ohle: inland rocky areas in central Portugal, with isolated populations in the Monchique range and Morocco
- Calendula suffruticosa subsp. maderensis (DC.) Govaerts: Madeira
- Calendula suffruticosa subsp. marginata (Willd.) Maire: endemic to a small area from Punta Carnero, Spain to Gibraltar
- Calendula suffruticosa subsp. maritima (Guss.) Meikle: Sardinia and Sicily
- Calendula suffruticosa subsp. monardii (Boiss. & Reut.) Ohle: Algeria
- Calendula suffruticosa subsp. suffruticosa: northwest Africa and Canary Islands
- Calendula suffruticosa subsp. tlemcensis Ohle: Algeria
- Calendula suffruticosa subsp. tomentosa (Ball) Murb.: southern Spain, in low elevation sandy loams from Punta Camarinal to east of the Guadalmesí River
- Calendula suffruticosa subsp. trialata P.Silveira & A.C.Gonç.: southwestern Spain (Cádiz), Cape Cires in Morocco
- Calendula suffruticosa subsp. vejerensis P.Silveira & A.C.Gonç.: endemic to calcereous sandstones in Vejer de la Frontera, in southern Spain.

== Sources ==
This article incorporates text from a free content work. Licensed under CC0 (license statement/permission). Text taken from Calendula suffruticosa. Encyclopedia of Life.
