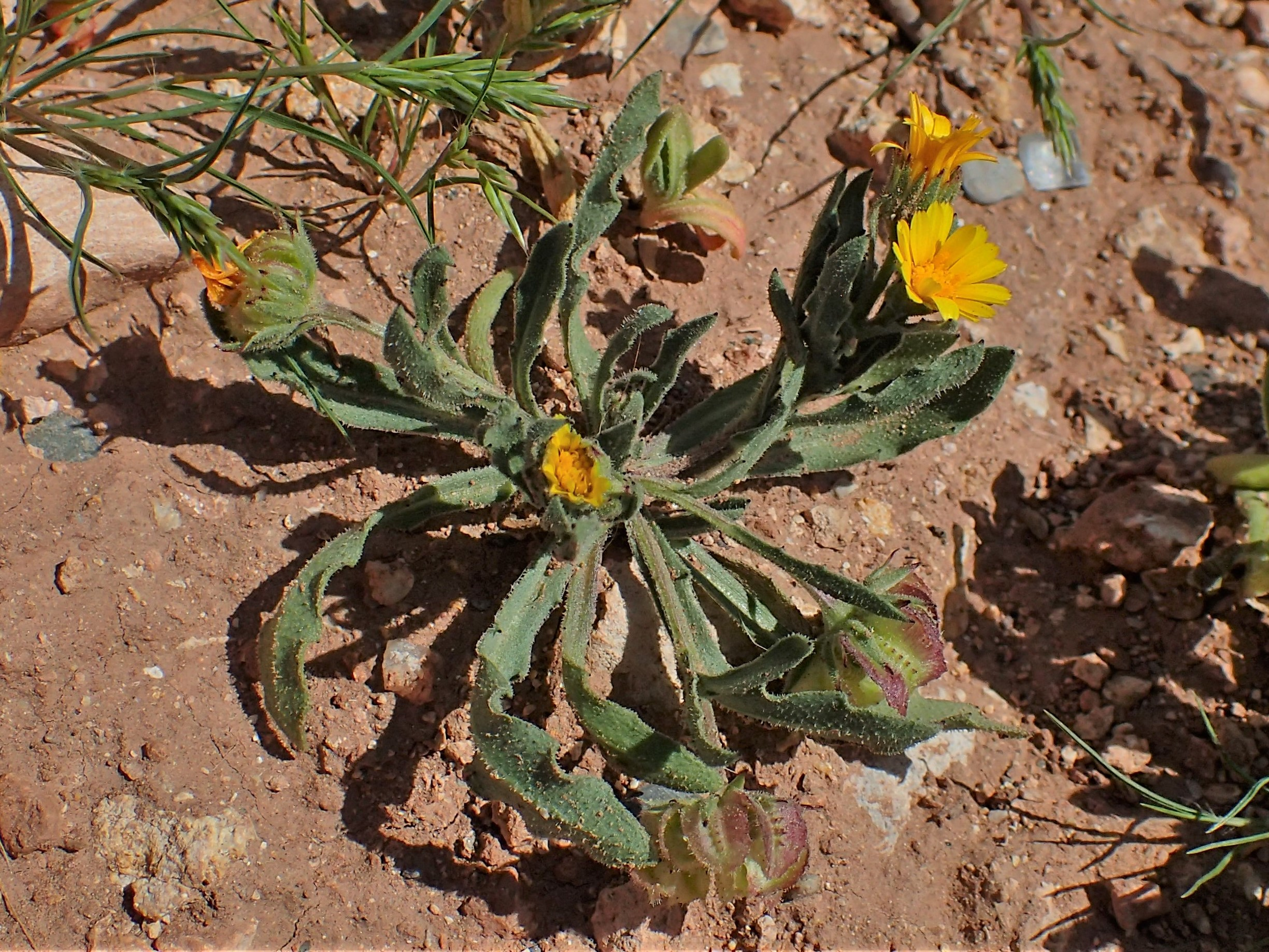
- Habit

Scientific classification
- Kingdom: Plantae
- Clade: Tracheophytes
- Clade: Angiosperms
- Clade: Eudicots
- Clade: Asterids
- Order: Asterales
- Family: Asteraceae
- Genus: Calendula
- Species: C. tripterocarpa

Binomial name
- Calendula tripterocarpa Rupr.

Synonyms
- Calendula platycarpa Coss.; Calendula thapsiaecarpa Pomel

= Calendula tripterocarpa =

Species of flowering plant

Calendula tripterocarpa is a species of flowering plant in the marigold genus Calendula, family Asteraceae. It is native to Spain, the Canary Islands, North Africa, and the Middle East as far as Iran. It is a therophyte.

== Description ==
This perennial plant reaches a height between 10 and 20 cm. The leaves are mid green, covered with short, sticky hairs. Flowers are multi petaled, and yellow or orange in colour. The young stems are at first erect, but later they begin to hang and spread on the soil.The most peripheral fruits have flat wings, and are therefore much broader than the fruits of Calendula arvensis. Flowers autumn to spring.

== Medicinal usage ==
Calendula tripterocarpa is a medicinal plant widely used in folk medicine for treatment of minor cuts, burns and skin irritation in Saudi Arabia. A 2018 study showed high phenol and flavonoid content. However, further study has to be accomplished on this plant type to prove its traditional uses and its various biological activities.
