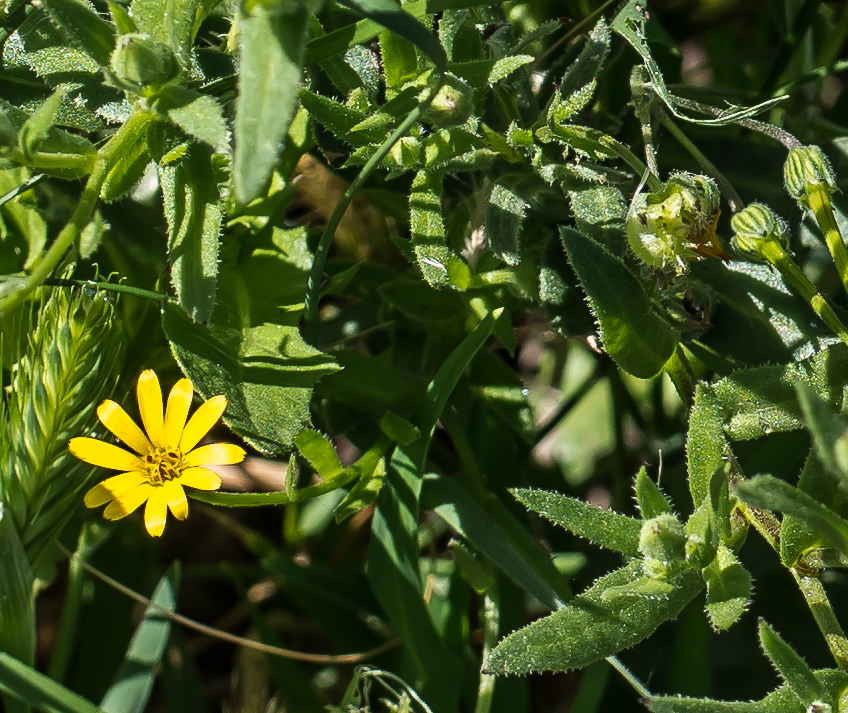
- In bloom on Gran Canaria

Scientific classification
- Kingdom: Plantae
- Clade: Tracheophytes
- Clade: Angiosperms
- Clade: Eudicots
- Clade: Asterids
- Order: Asterales
- Family: Asteraceae
- Genus: Calendula
- Species: C. stellata

Binomial name
- Calendula stellata Cav.

Synonyms
- List: Calendula asterias Fisch. & C.A.Mey.; Calendula cornuta Poir.; Calendula dentata Steud.; Calendula denticulata Schousb. ex Willd.; Calendula forskohleana Steud.; Calendula macroptera Rouy; Calendula sicula Willd.; Calendula spatulata Hoffmanns.; Calendula vidalii Vidal y Lopez; Caltha dentata Moench; Caltha stellata Moench

= Calendula stellata =

Species of flowering plant

Calendula stellata (also known as Sicilian marigold) is a species of annual flowering plant in the marigold genus Calendula, family Asteraceae. It is native to northwestern Africa, Malta, and Sicily. Flowering period is between January and April. Flowers are typically orange or yellow.

The Royal Horticultural Society considers it to be "highly attractive" and suitable for gardens in a Mediterranean climate.
