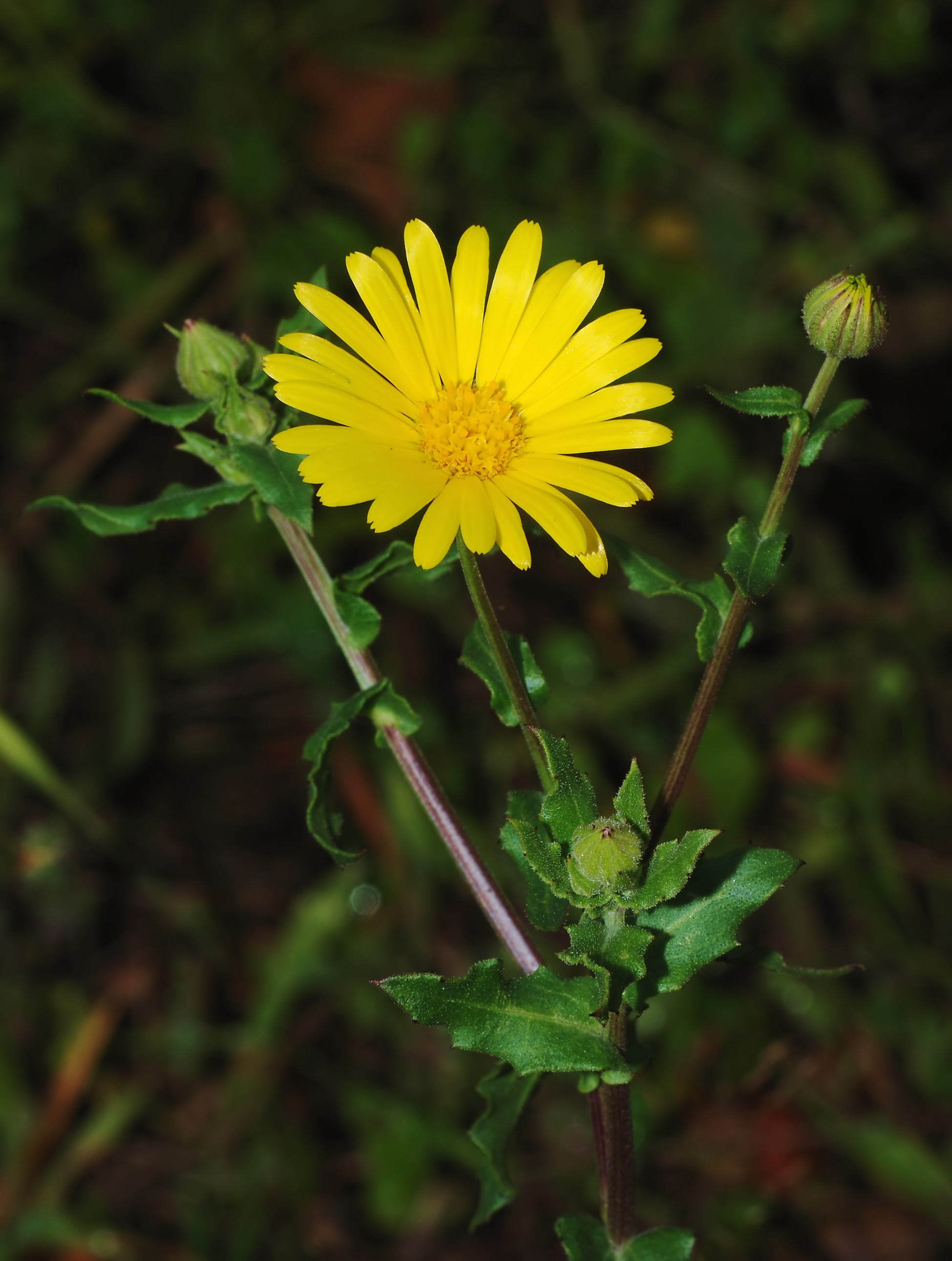
- field marigold (Calendula arvensis)

Scientific classification
- Kingdom: Plantae
- Clade: Tracheophytes
- Clade: Angiosperms
- Clade: Eudicots
- Clade: Asterids
- Order: Asterales
- Family: Asteraceae
- Subfamily: Asteroideae
- Tribe: Calenduleae
- Genus: Calendula; L.

Species
- See text

Synonyms
- Calendella Kuntze (1898), nom. superfl.; Caltha Mill. (1754), nom. illeg.

= Calendula =

Genus of flowering plants in the daisy family

Calendula (/kəˈlɛndjuːlə/) is a genus of about 15–20 species of annual and perennial herbaceous plants in the daisy family, Asteraceae that are often known as marigolds. They are native to Europe, North Africa, Macaronesia, West Asia and Western Himalayas and have their center of diversity in the Mediterranean Region. Other plants known as marigolds include corn marigold, desert marigold, marsh marigold, and plants of the genus Tagetes.

The genus name Calendula is a modern Latin diminutive of calendae, meaning "little calendar", "little clock" or possibly "little weather-glass". The common name "marigold", a contraction of "Mary's gold" used especially for Calendula officinalis, refers to the Virgin Mary. C. officinalis is the most commonly cultivated and used species, popular herbal and cosmetic products named "Calendula" invariably derive from it.

== Uses ==
=== History ===
Calendula was not a major medicinal herb but it was used in historic times for headaches, red eye, fever and toothaches. As late as the 17th century Nicholas Culpeper claimed Calendula benefited the heart, but it was not considered an especially efficacious medicine.

In historic times Calendula was more often used for magical purposes than medicinal ones. One 16th-century potion containing Calendula claimed to reveal fairies. An unmarried woman with two suitors would take a blend of powdered Calendula, marjoram, wormwood and thyme simmered in honey and white wine used as an ointment in a ritual to reveal her true match.

Ancient Romans and Greeks used the golden Calendula in many rituals and ceremonies, sometimes wearing crowns or garlands made from the flowers. One of its nicknames is "Mary's Gold", referring to the flowers' use in early Christian events in some countries. Calendula flowers are sacred flowers in India and have been used to decorate the statues of Hindu deities since early times.

The most common use in historic times was culinary, however, and the plant was used for both its color and its flavor. They were used for dumplings, wine, oatmeal and puddings. In English cuisine Calendula were often cooked in the same pot with spinach, or used to flavor stewed birds. According to sixteenth-century Englishman John Gerard, every proper soup of Dutch cuisine in his era would include Calendula petals.

=== Culinary ===
Also known as "poor man's saffron", the petals are edible and can be used fresh in salads or dried and used to color cheese or as a substitute for saffron. Calendulas have a mildly sweet taste that is slightly bitter, and as it dries these flavors become more intense. It can be used to add color to soups, stews, poultry dishes, custards and liquors.

The common name for Calendula officinalis in Britain is 'pot-marigold', named so because of its use in broths and soups.

=== Dyes ===
Dye can be extracted from the flower and produce shades of honey, gold, orange, light brown, and vibrant yellow.

== Chemistry ==
The flowers of C. officinalis contain flavonol glycosides, triterpene oligoglycosides, oleanane-type triterpene glycosides, saponins, and a sesquiterpene glucoside.

== Pharmacological effects ==
Calendula officinalis oil is still used medicinally as an anti-inflammatory and a remedy for healing wounds. Calendula ointments are skin products available for use on minor cuts, burns, and skin irritation; though evidence of their effectiveness is weak.

Plant pharmacological studies have suggested that Calendula extracts have antiviral, antigenotoxic, and anti-inflammatory properties in vitro. In herbalism, Calendula in suspension or in tincture is used topically for treating acne, reducing inflammation, controlling bleeding, and soothing irritated tissue. Limited evidence indicates Calendula cream or ointment is effective in treating radiation dermatitis. Topical application of C. officinalis ointment has helped to prevent dermatitis and pain; thus reducing the incidence rate of skipped radiation treatments in randomized trials.

Calendula has been used traditionally for abdominal cramps and constipation. In experiments with rabbit jejunum, the aqueous-ethanol extract of C. officinalis flowers was shown to have both spasmolytic and spasmogenic effects, thus providing a scientific rationale for this traditional use. An aqueous extract of C. officinalis obtained by a novel extraction method has demonstrated antitumor (cytotoxic) activity and immunomodulatory properties (lymphocyte activation) in vitro, as well as antitumor activity in mice.

Calendula plants are known to cause allergic reactions in susceptible individuals, and should be avoided during pregnancy.

== Diversity ==
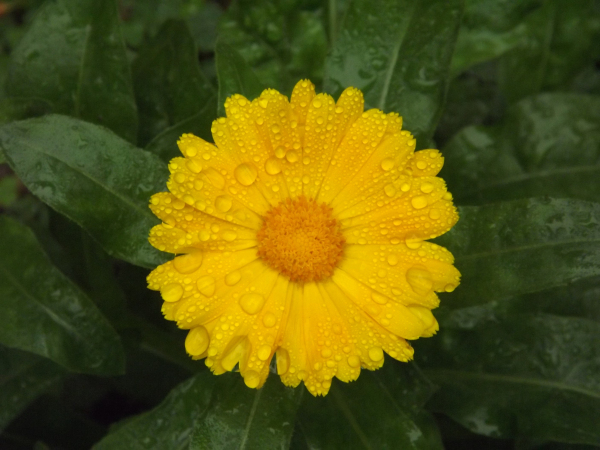
Flower of Calendula officinalis

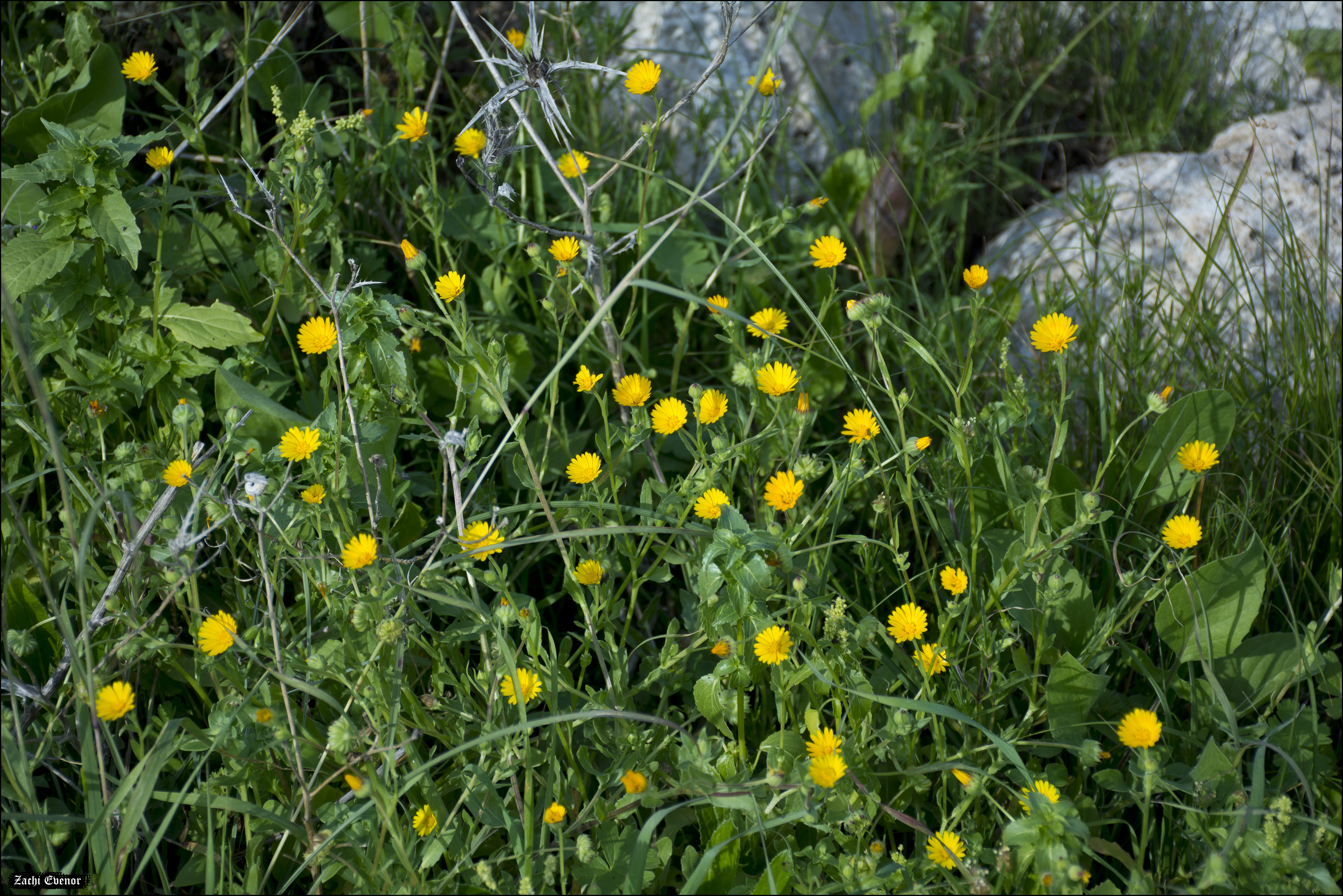
Group of flowers of Calendula arvensis

Species include:

- Calendula arvensis (Vaill.) L. – field marigold, wild marigold
- Calendula denticulata Schousb. ex Willd.
- Calendula eckerleinii Ohle
- Calendula incana Willd.
  - Calendula incana subsp. algarbiensis (Boiss.) Ohle
  - Calendula incana subsp. maderensis (DC.) Ohle – Madeiran marigold
  - Calendula incana subsp. maritima (Guss.) Ohle – sea marigold
  - Calendula incana subsp. microphylla (Lange) Ohle
- Calendula lanzae Maire
- Calendula maritima Guss. - sea marigold
- Calendula maroccana (Ball) Ball
  - Calendula maroccana subsp. maroccana
  - Calendula maroccana subsp. murbeckii (Lanza) Ohle
- Calendula meuselii Ohle
- Calendula officinalis L. – pot marigold, garden marigold, ruddles, Scottish marigold
- Calendula palaestina Boiss.
- Calendula stellata Cav.
- Calendula suffruticosa Vahl
  - Calendula suffruticosa subsp. balansae (Boiss. & Reut.) Ohle
  - Calendula suffruticosa subsp. boissieri Lanza
  - Calendula suffruticosa subsp. fulgida (Raf.) Guadagno
  - Calendula suffruticosa subsp. lusitanica (Boiss.) Ohle
  - Calendula suffruticosa subsp. maritima (Guss.) Meikle
  - Calendula suffruticosa subsp. monardii (Boiss. & Reut.) Ohle
  - Calendula suffruticosa subsp. tomentosa Murb.
- Calendula tripterocarpa Rupr.

== Gallery ==
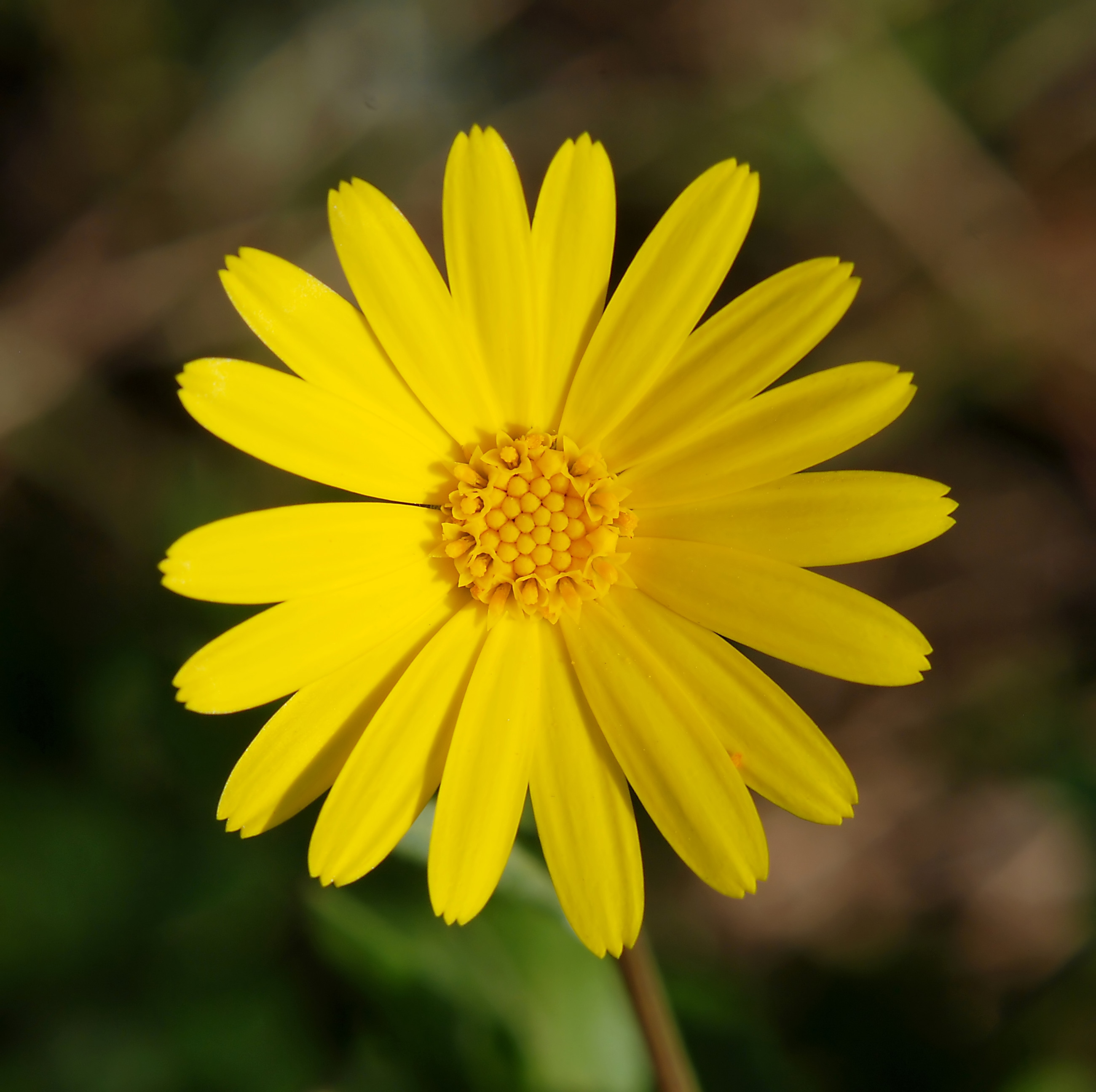
Calendula arvensis

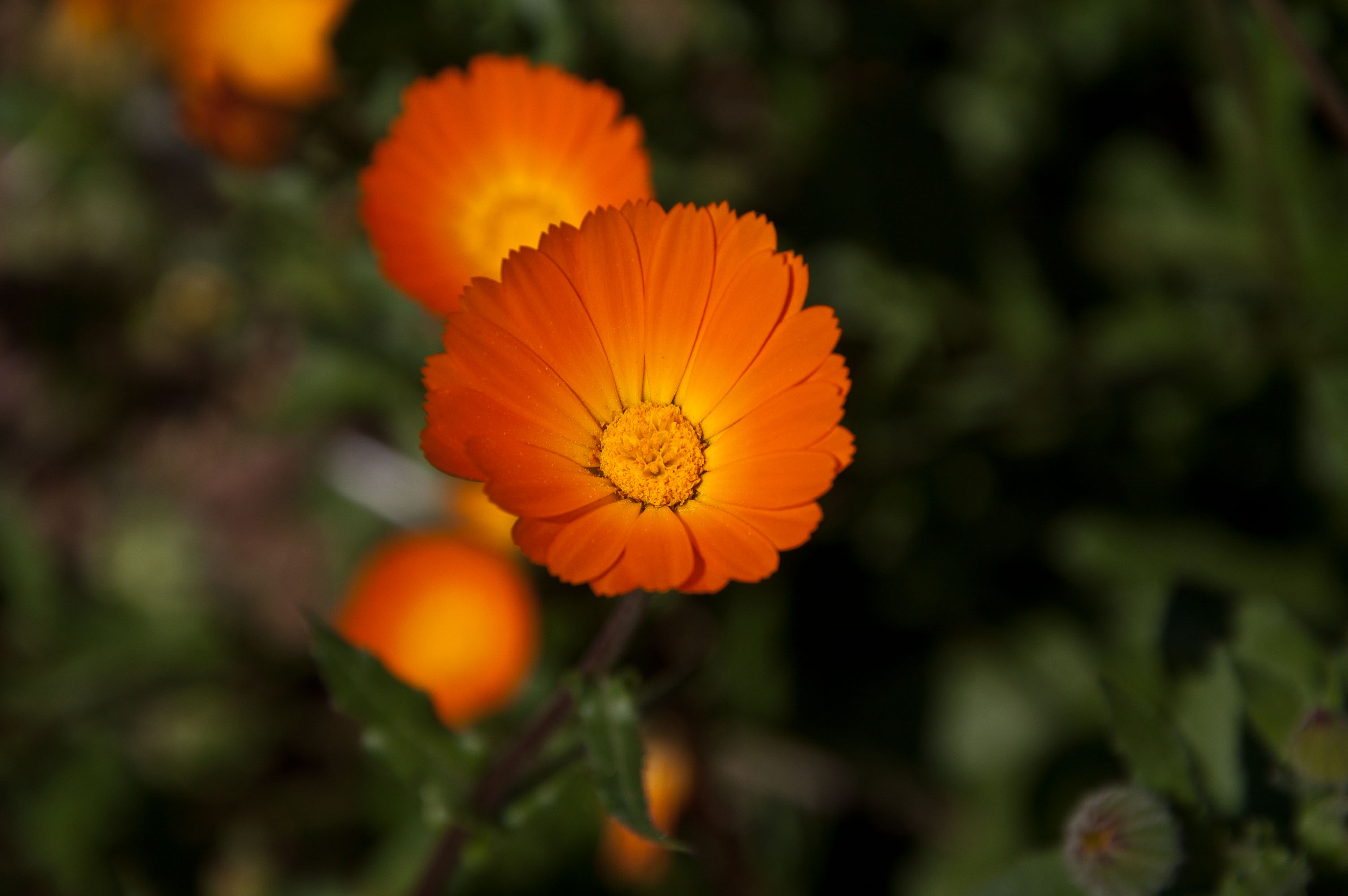
Calendula suffruticosa subsp. fulgida

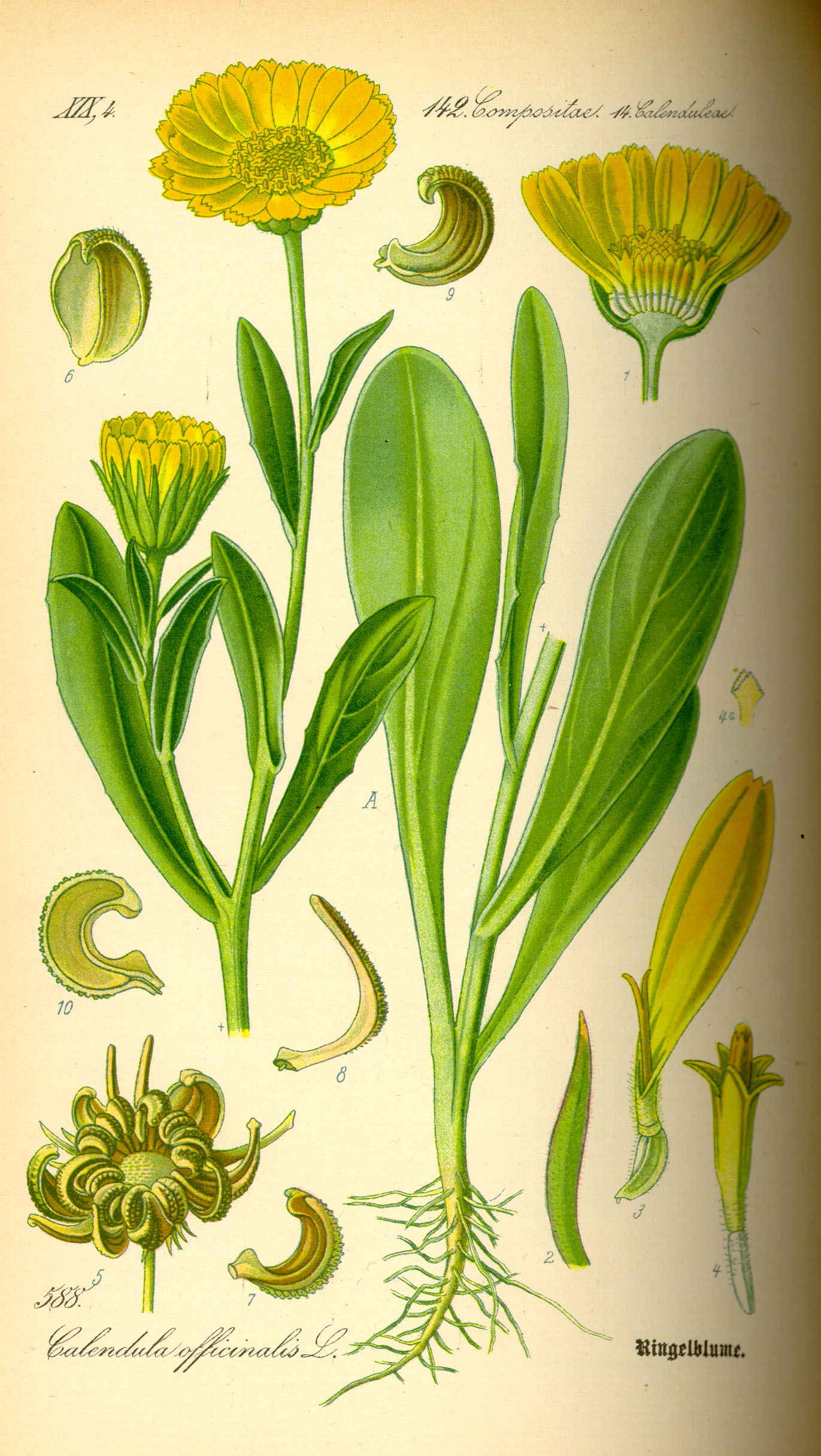
Calendula officinalis from Flora von Deutschland, Österreich und der Schweiz, by Thomé, 1885

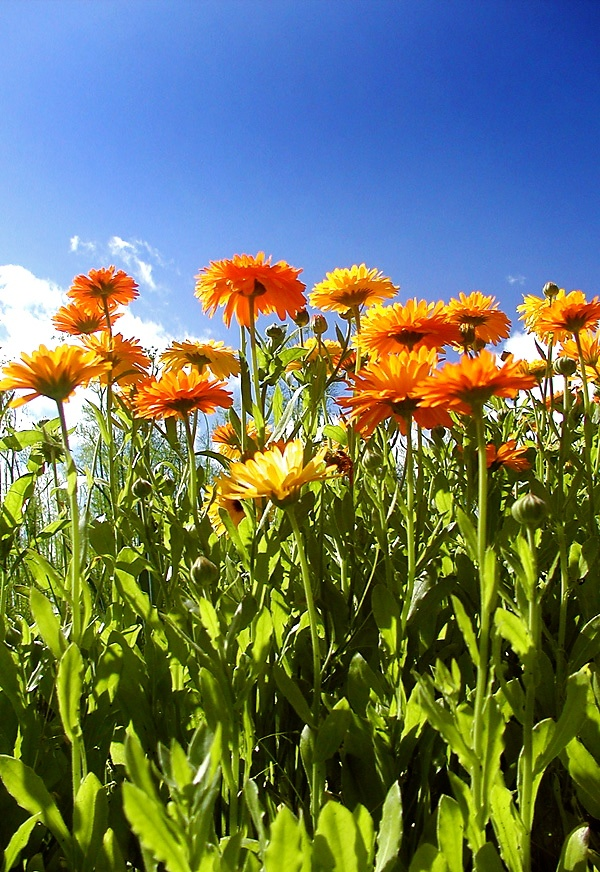
Calendula officinalis

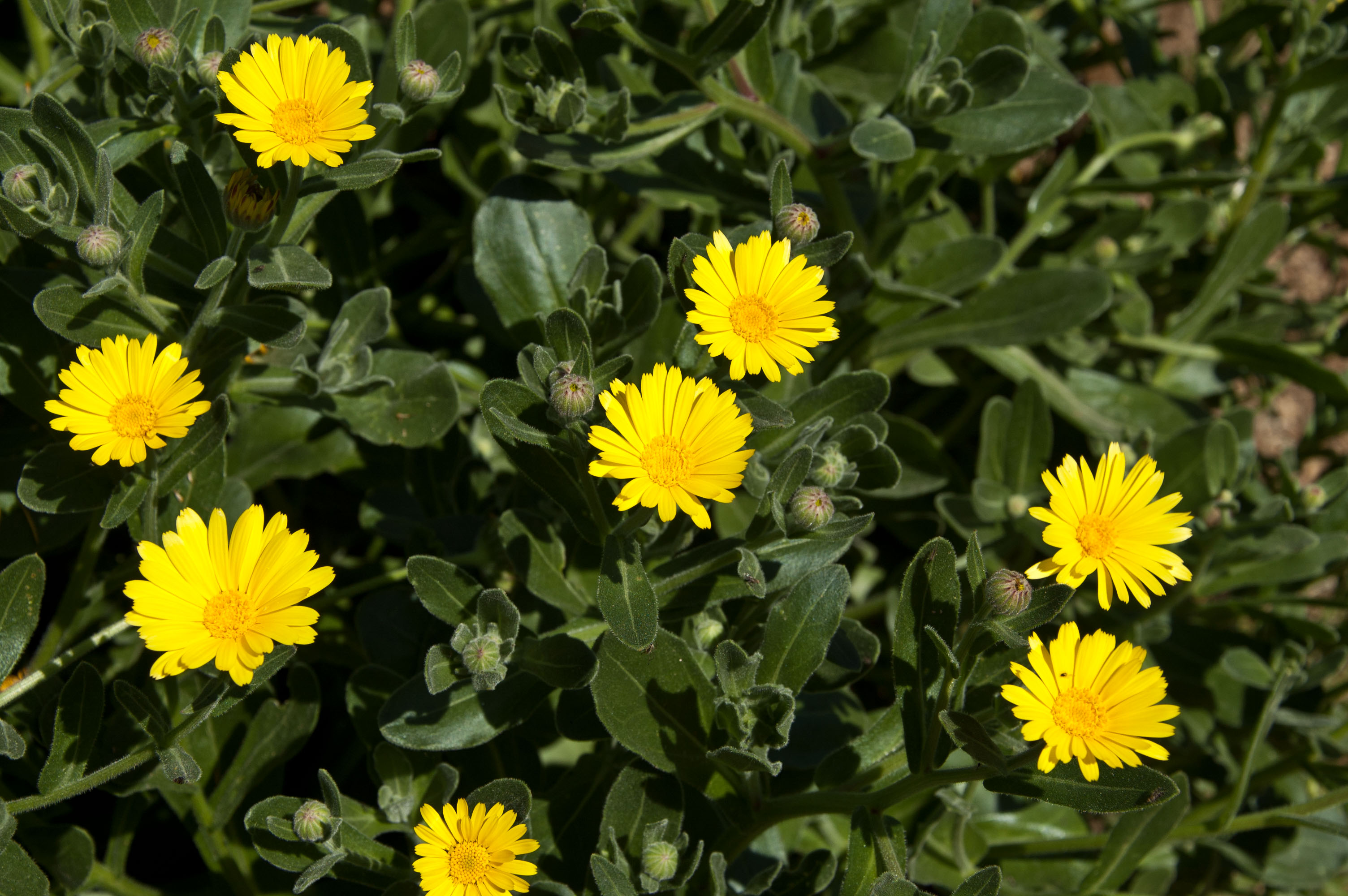
The endangered Calendula maritima

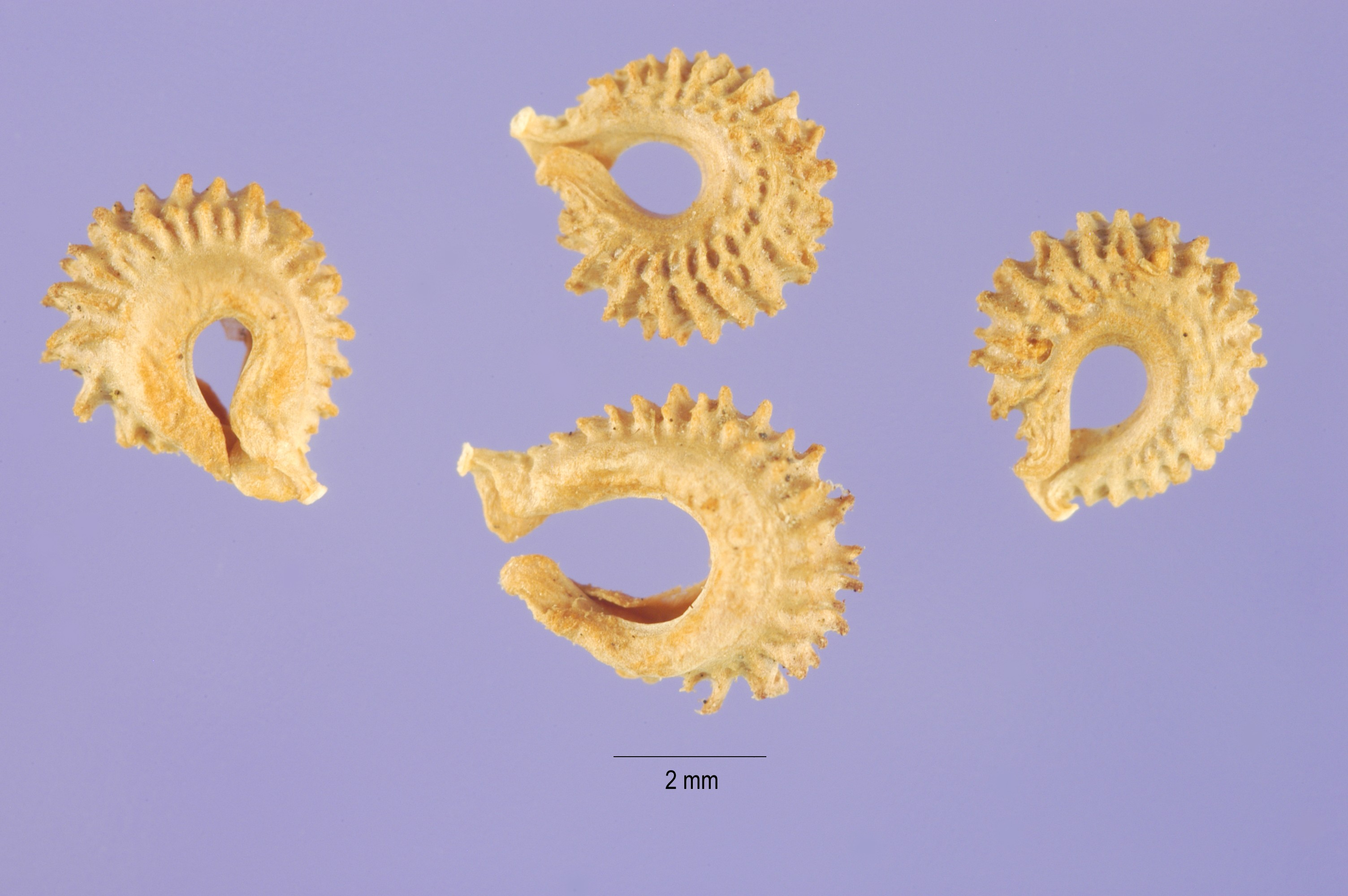
Calendula arvensis seeds

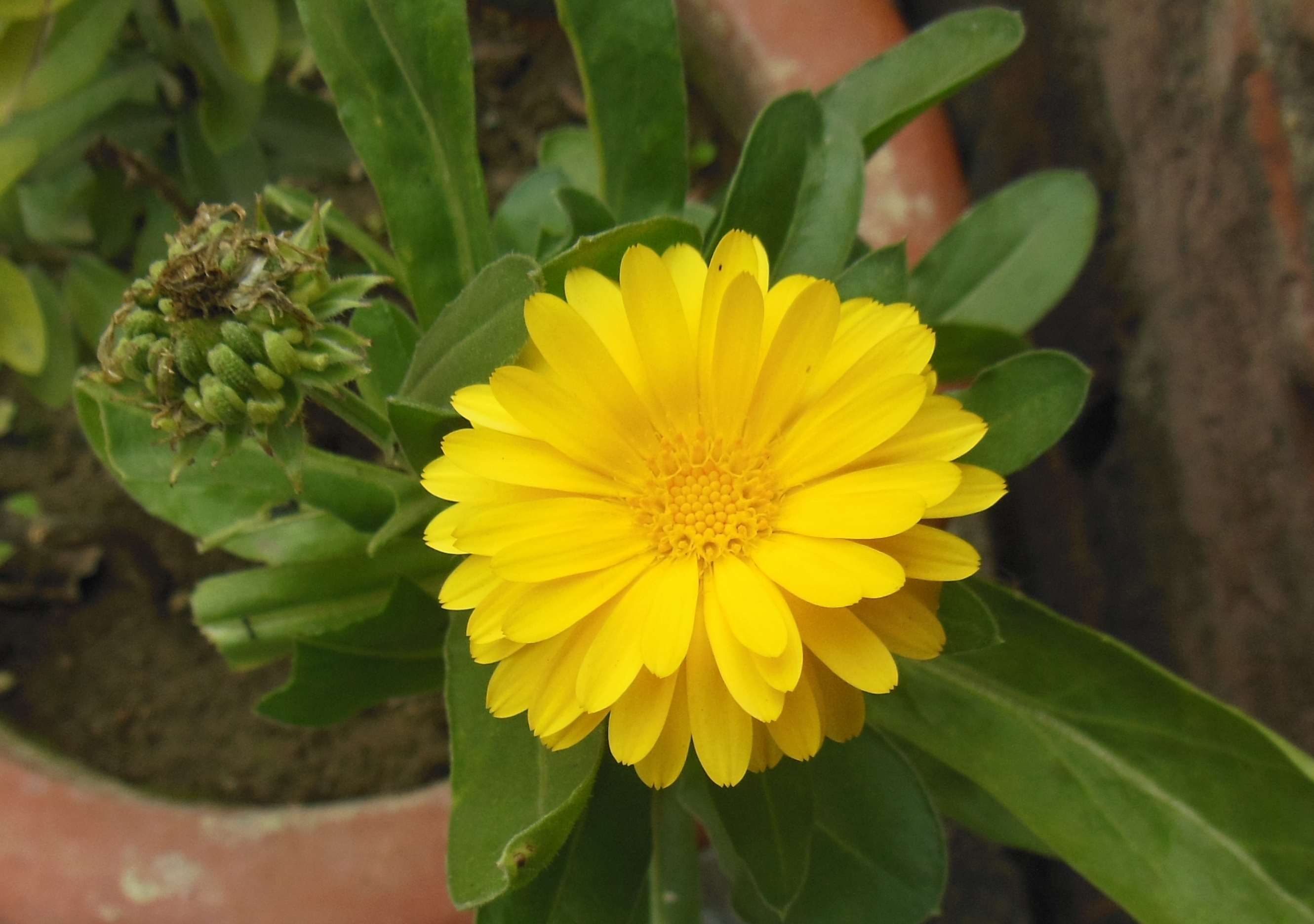
Calendula arvensis in full bloom
