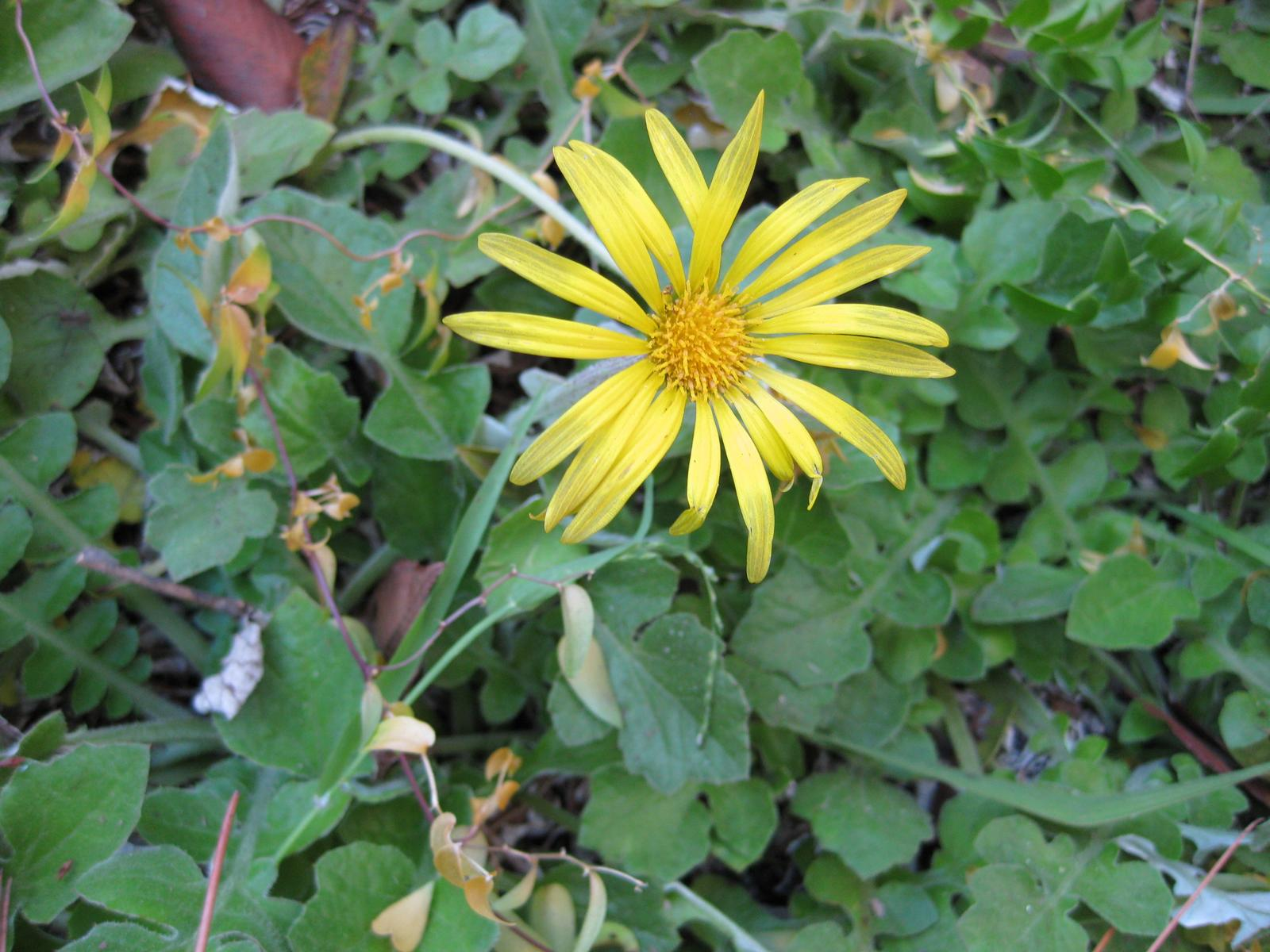

Conservation status
- Critically Endangered (IUCN 3.1)

Scientific classification
- Kingdom: Plantae
- Clade: Tracheophytes
- Clade: Angiosperms
- Clade: Eudicots
- Clade: Asterids
- Order: Asterales
- Family: Asteraceae
- Genus: Calendula
- Species: C. maritima

Binomial name
- Calendula maritima Guss. (Giovanni Gussone)

Synonyms
- Calendula suffruticosa subsp. maritima (Guss.) Meikle

= Calendula maritima =

Species of flowering plant

Calendula maritima, known as the sea marigold and trailing calendula, is a very rare species from the family of Asteraceae. Some scientists regarded it as Calendula suffruticosa subspecies maritima.

This halophytic plant is endemic to the western part of Sicily in small coastal habitats, and is a critically endangered species. As of 2012, this plant could still be found in only five small sites in East Sicily. The Province of Trapani has chosen the plant as its official symbol. The sea marigold occurs only on the Sicilian coast: on the island mainland between Marsala and the Monte Cofano; and on the two nearby islets Isola Grande dello Stagnone and Isola la Formica. The most significant population is in a small 10-km^{2} (3.9-mi^{2}) nature reserve area within the Riserva Naturale Saline di Trapani e Paceco.

It is on the IUCN Red List of critically endangered plant species.

== Description ==
This perennial plant reaches a height between 20 and 40 cm (8 and 16 in). The stems can be easily lignified on the underparts and the leaves are covered with short sticky hairs. The young stems are at first erect, but later they begin to hang and spread on the soil.

In contrast to Calendula officinalis (pot marigold), the leaves are fleshy and have a strong smell. The form of the leaves varies from egg-shaped to linear depending on their placement on the stems.

The basket-shaped blossoms consists of pale to bright yellow single-standing petals, and have a diameter between 3 and 5 cm (1.2 and 2.0 in). The main flowering period is from May to June.

== Threats ==
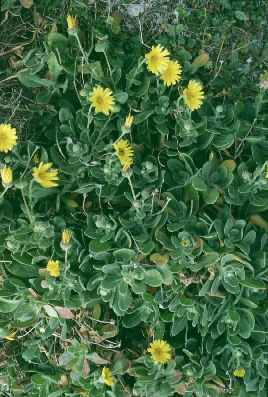
C. maritima foliage and flowers

The C. maritima habitat outside the nature reserve is under serious threat of destruction due to urban development, such as expansion of the Marsala harbour. In addition, other threats and reasons for its rarity include air pollution in the nature reserve from the nearby salt-works and the competition of invasive species, such as the Hottentot fig 'ice plant' (Carpobrotus edulis), in all native locations. The exact number of the remaining native plants is currently unknown.

== Cultivation ==
The sea marigold is cultivated as an ornamental plant, used as a flowering groundcover and container plant. Cultivars such as the yellow flowering 'Skyfire' and 'Summerlovers Skyfire Yellow', are commonly planted in gardens, parks, and street and highway median plantings; and in flower pots on patios and balconies.

== See also ==
- Index - Flora of Sicily
