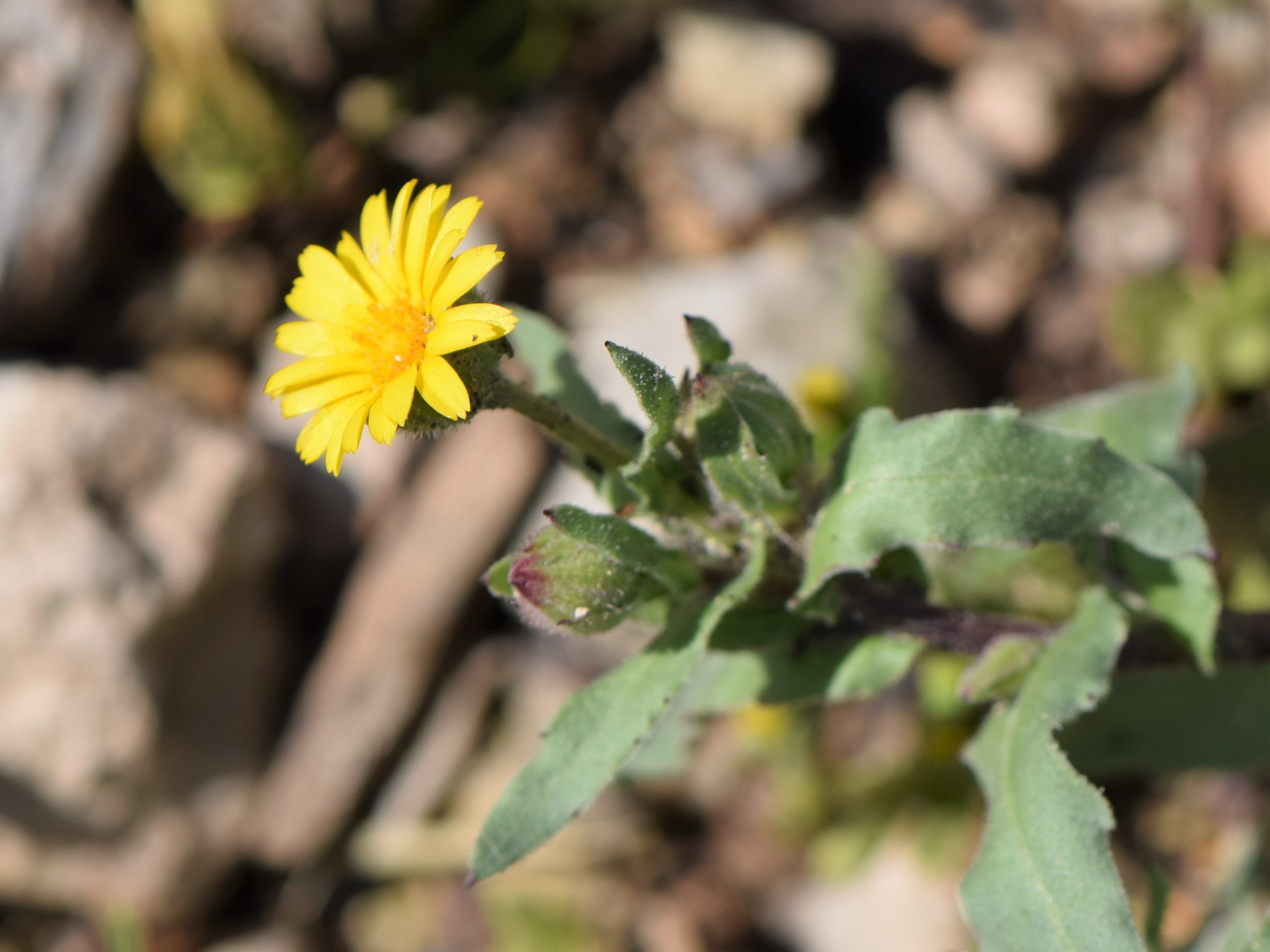

Scientific classification
- Kingdom: Plantae
- Clade: Tracheophytes
- Clade: Angiosperms
- Clade: Eudicots
- Clade: Asterids
- Order: Asterales
- Family: Asteraceae
- Genus: Calendula
- Species: C. palaestina

Binomial name
- Calendula palaestina Boiss.

Synonyms
- Calendula ceratosperma Viv.; Calendula repanda Boiss. & Noë

= Calendula palaestina =

Species of flowering plant in the marigold family

Calendula palaestina, the Palestine marigold, is a species of annual flowering plant in the marigold genus Calendula, family Asteraceae. It is an annual, erect, non-succulent herb, standing 20–40 cm high, with glandular hairs. The leaves are alternate, 2.5-10cm long to 20mm wide, flat, and hairy to rough in texture, with margins mostly wavy and toothed, and tips more or less pointed.

Its flower heads, composed on many yellow ligulate (ray) and tubular (disc) florets, are borne singly at the ends of the stems. They have 2.5–4 cm long outer achenes, 2–2.5 cm long beaks, winged or wingless, sometimes crested or toothed; intermediate achenes are elongated; inner achenes are smaller, strongly curved, with scattered hairs.

The native range of this species is the eastern Mediterranean to western Iran, and it has been introduced to New South Wales. It grows primarily in the subtropical biome.

== Chemistry ==
The flowers, leaves, and stems of various Calendula species contain flavonoids, xanthophylls, and carotenoids, essential oils, coumarins (scopoletin), and water-soluble polysaccharides. Like other species of Calendula, C. palaestina is used in various traditional and medicinal practices for its anti-inflammatory and antioxidant properties.

There is evidence that this species of Calendula has the potential to lower whitefly populations in a comprehensive pest management program in local communities, pending cultivation of these medicinal plant species.

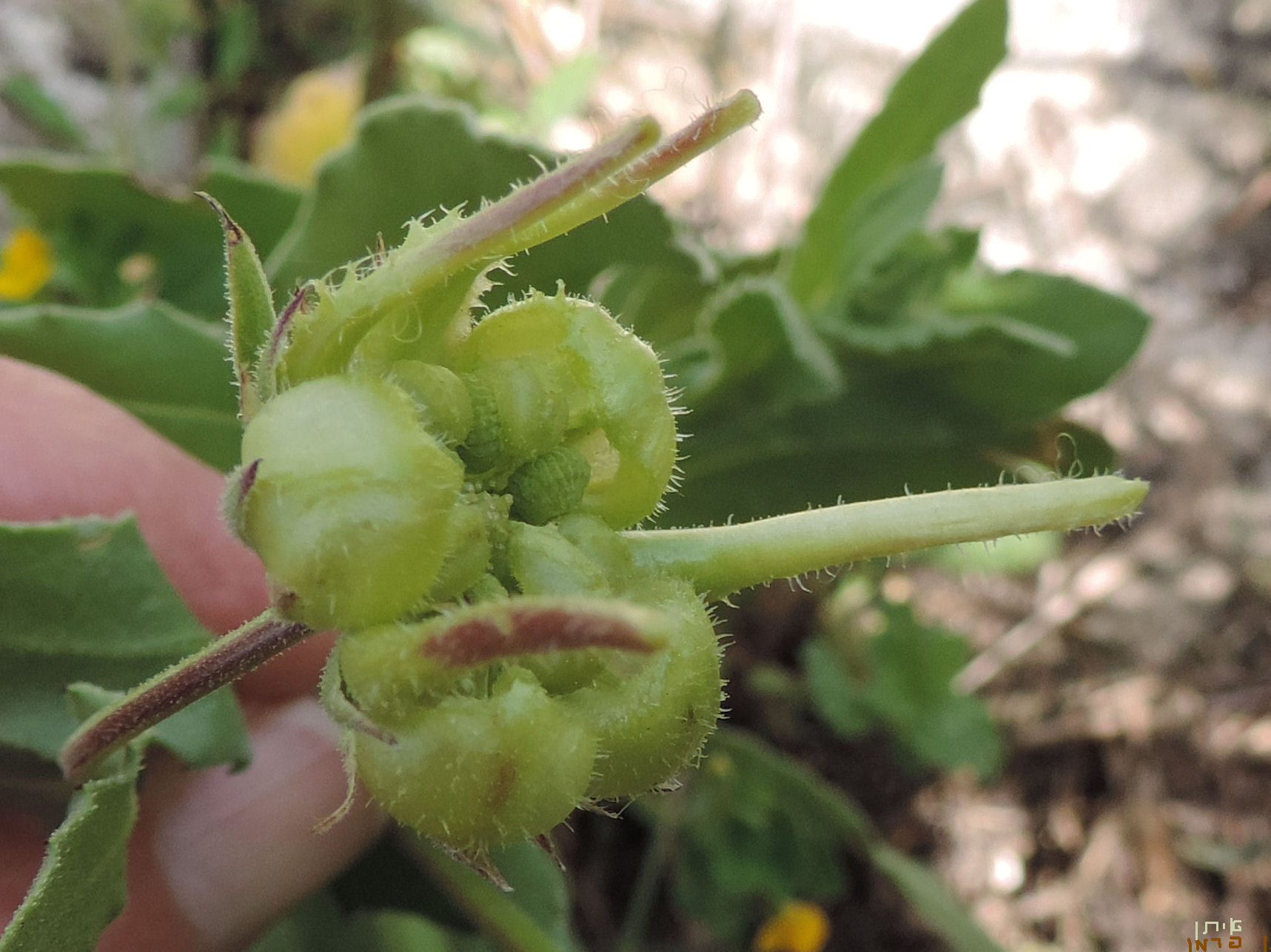
Calendula palaestina seeds
