= Salt pans of Trapani and Paceco =

Italian nature reserve

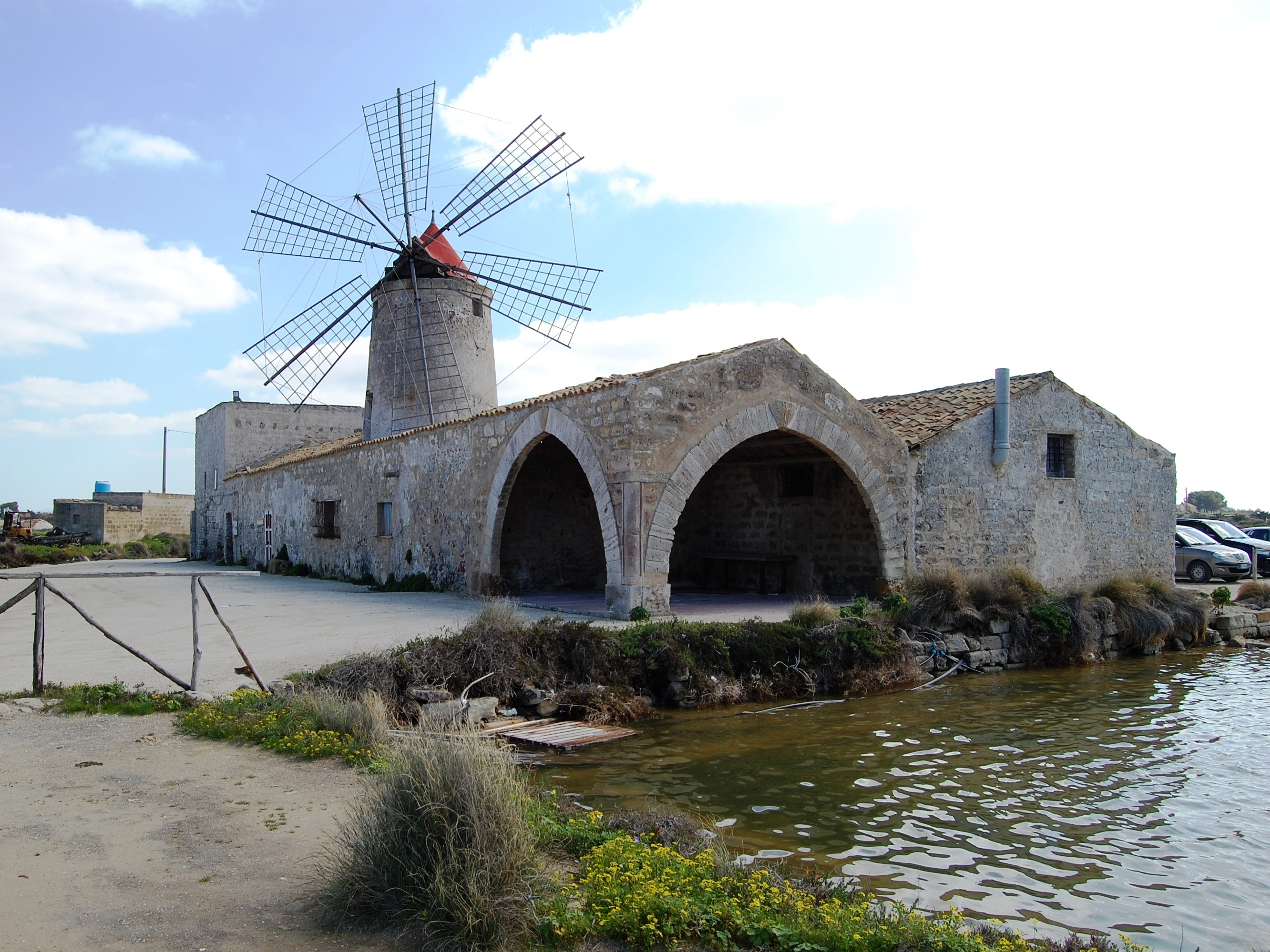
The saline work museum

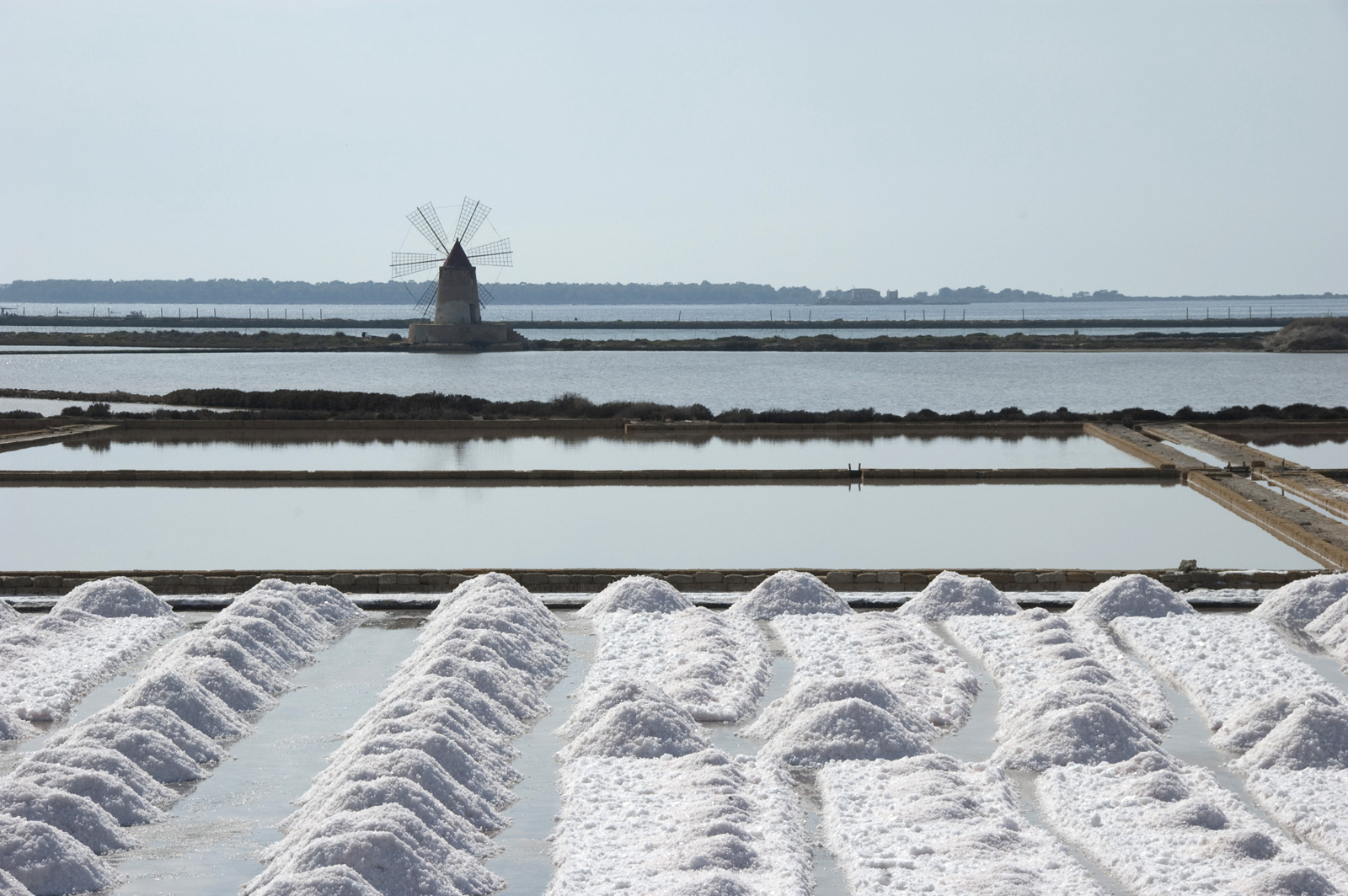
Salt harvest

Riserva naturale orientata Saline di Trapani e Paceco is an Italian nature reserve in the Province of Trapani between the municipalities of Trapani and Paceco on the west coast of Sicily. It was founded in 1995 and in the framework of the Ramsar Convention entrusted to WWF Italy. Its area of 987 hectares (2,440 acres) consists of two zones (Zona A and Zona B). Besides Mediterranean flora and fauna, there is a saline work museum in an old salt mill.

== Flora and fauna ==
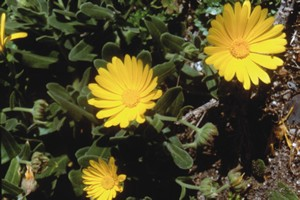
Calendula maritima

The nature reserve is the habitat of many endemic plant species. The halophyte flora which is adaptable to the salt marshes and the soils with high salt concentrations is represented by some of the rarest plants of Sicily, like the sea marigold (Calendula maritima), Limoniastrum monopetalum, Cynomorium coccineum or Limonium densiflorum.

Rare animals are the osprey (Pandion haliaetus), the peregrine falcon (Falco peregrinus), the common painted frog (Discoglossus pictus), as well as the insect species Bucherillo littoralis, Stenoniscus carinatus, Pterolepis elymica, Cicindela circumdata imperialis, Cicindela littorea goudati, Teia dubia and Aphanius fasciatus.

The salt works are an important stopover for many European migratory birds before they fly across the Strait of Sicily to Africa. 170 bird species have been counted here.

== Salt Museum ==
Located in an old mill, the Salt Museum is a private structure with tools and an exhibition of the traditional activity of the artisanal production of salt. Nearby is the "Salina Culcasi", with Torre di Nubia ( 37°58′54″N 12°29′41″E ), part of the ancient Torri costiere della Sicilia system to prevent the theft of salt by Barbary pirates from Maghreb.

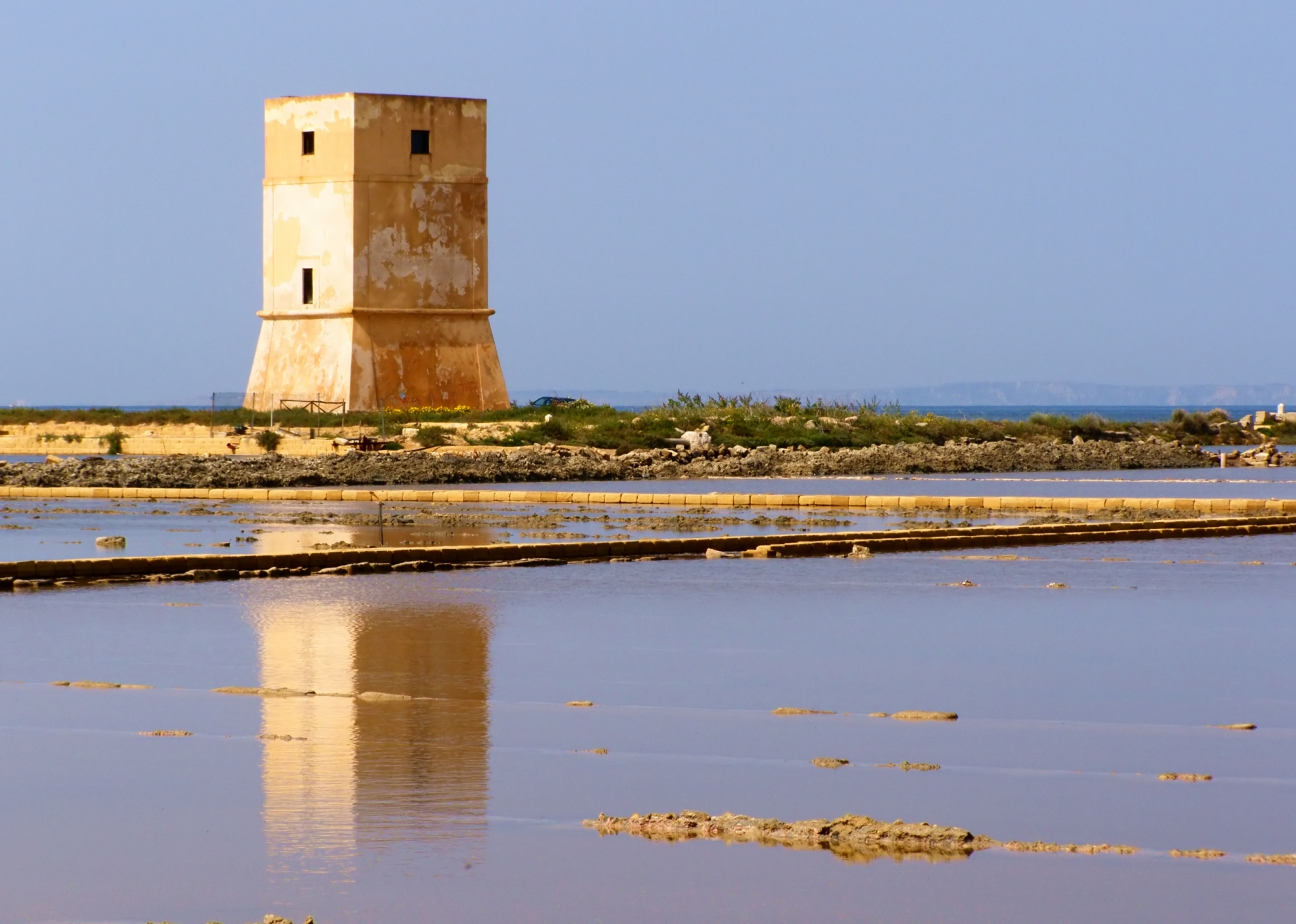
Torre Nubia near Salina Culcasi of Paceco (Trapani)

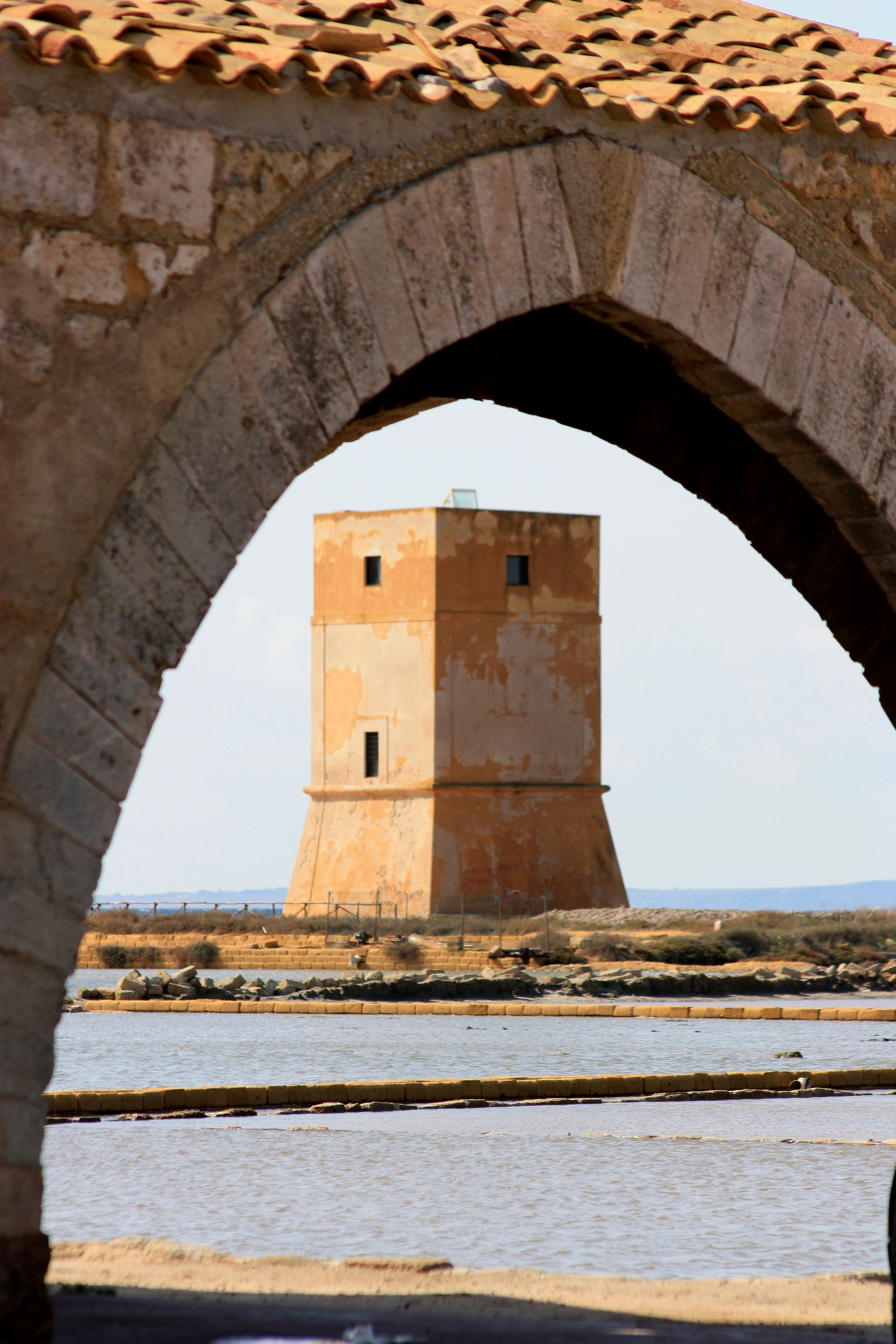
Torre Nubia, view from arc of museum

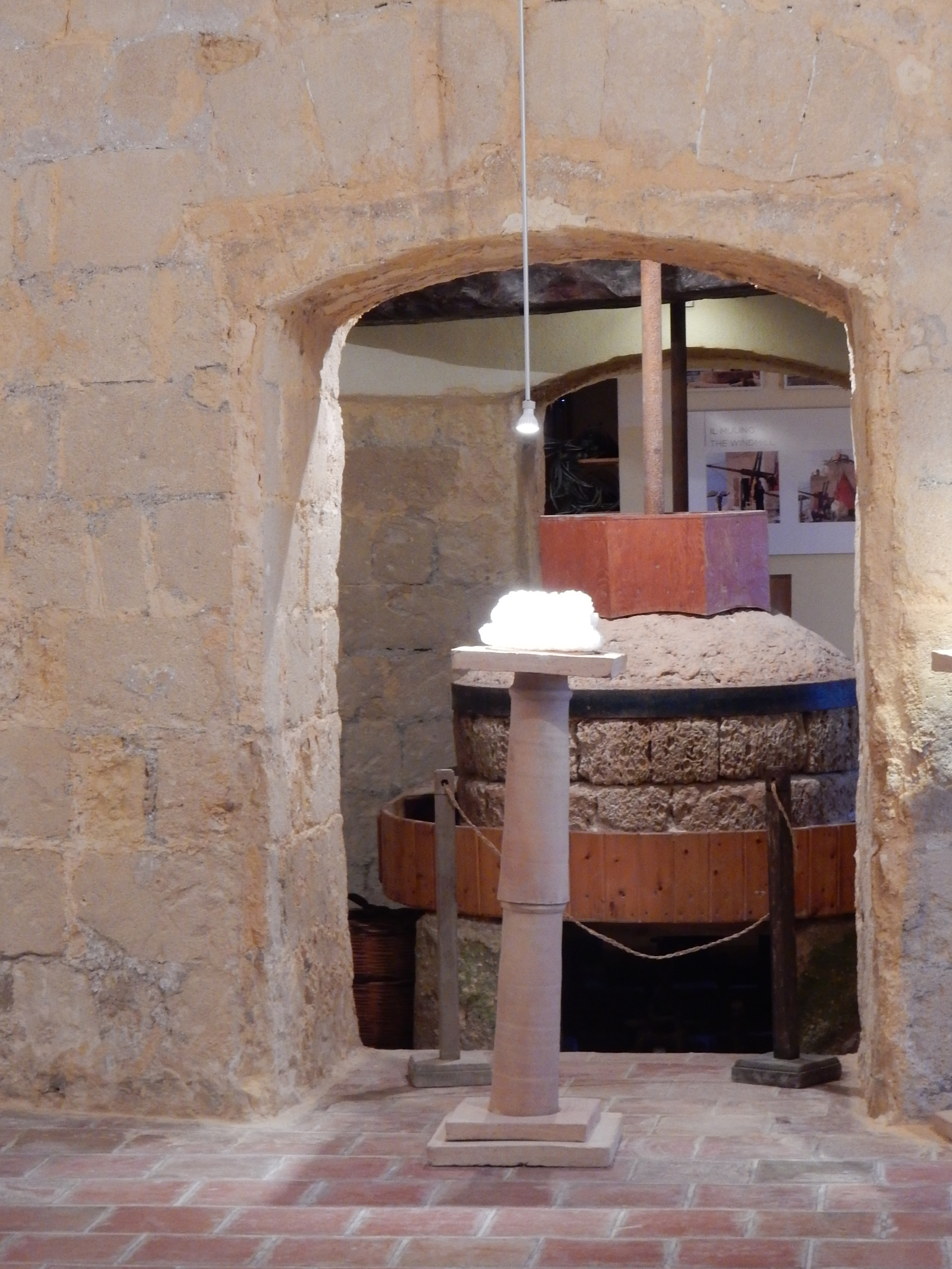
Ancient stone millstone

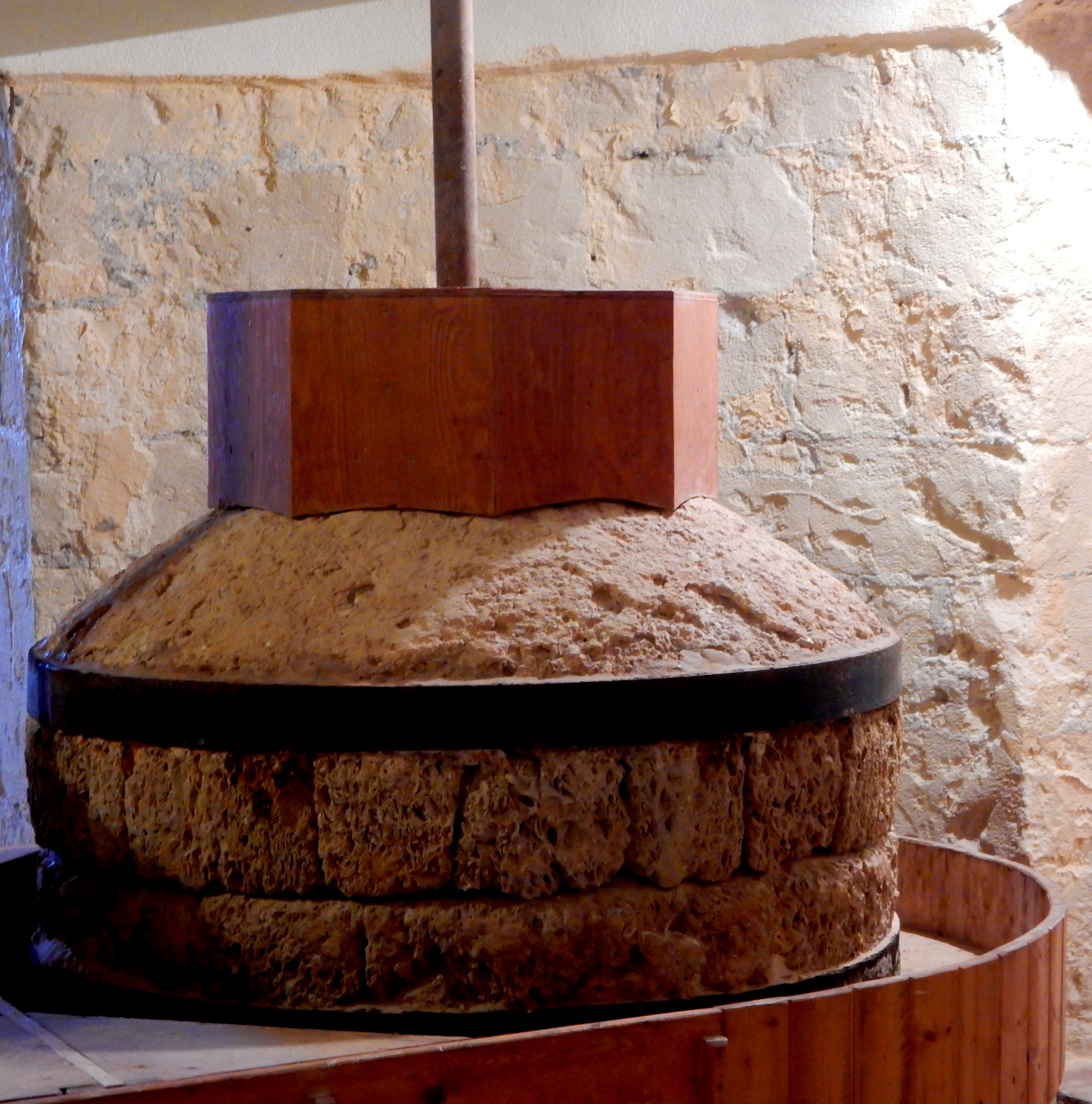
Ancient stone millstone (other side)

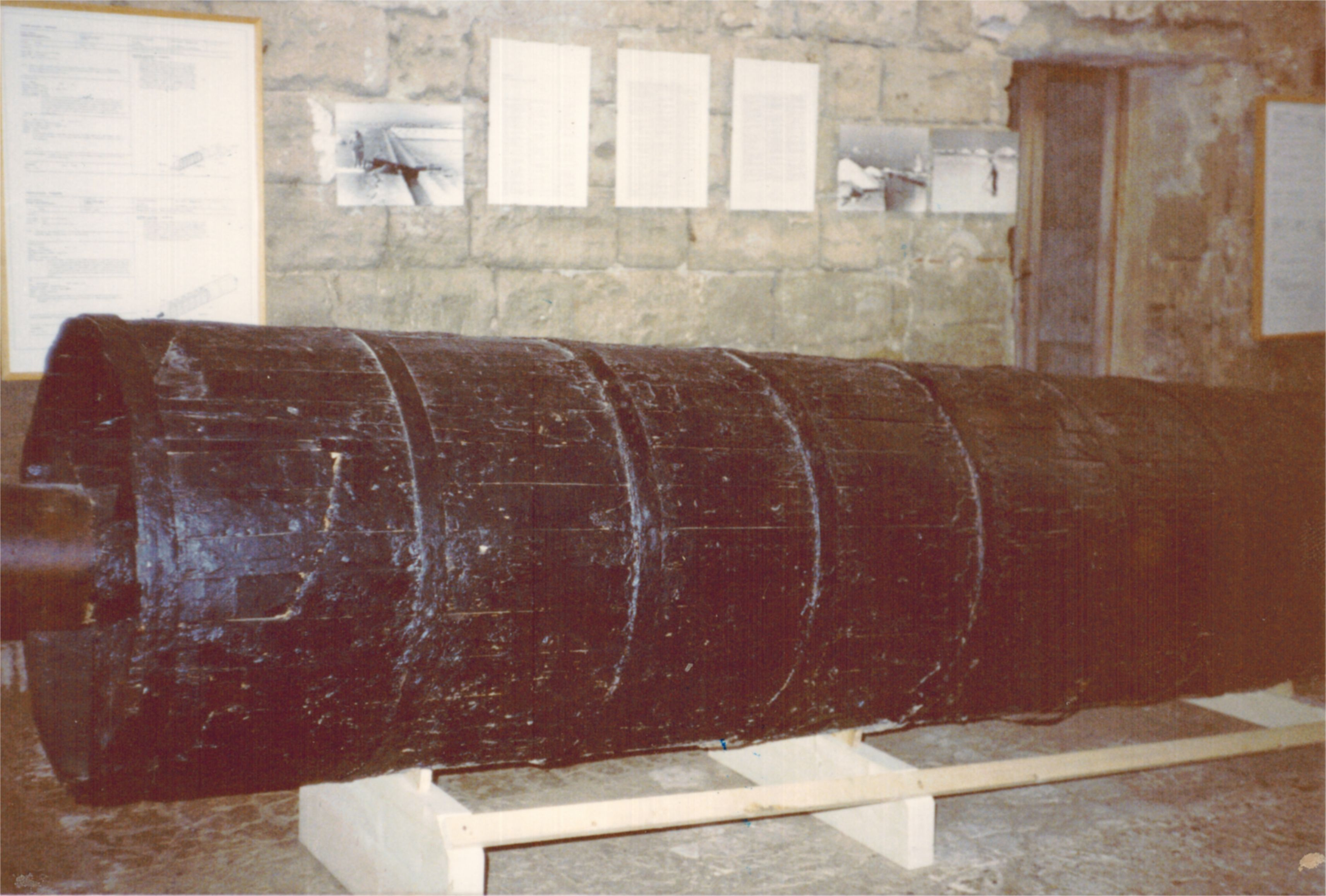
Old Archimedes' screw (front)

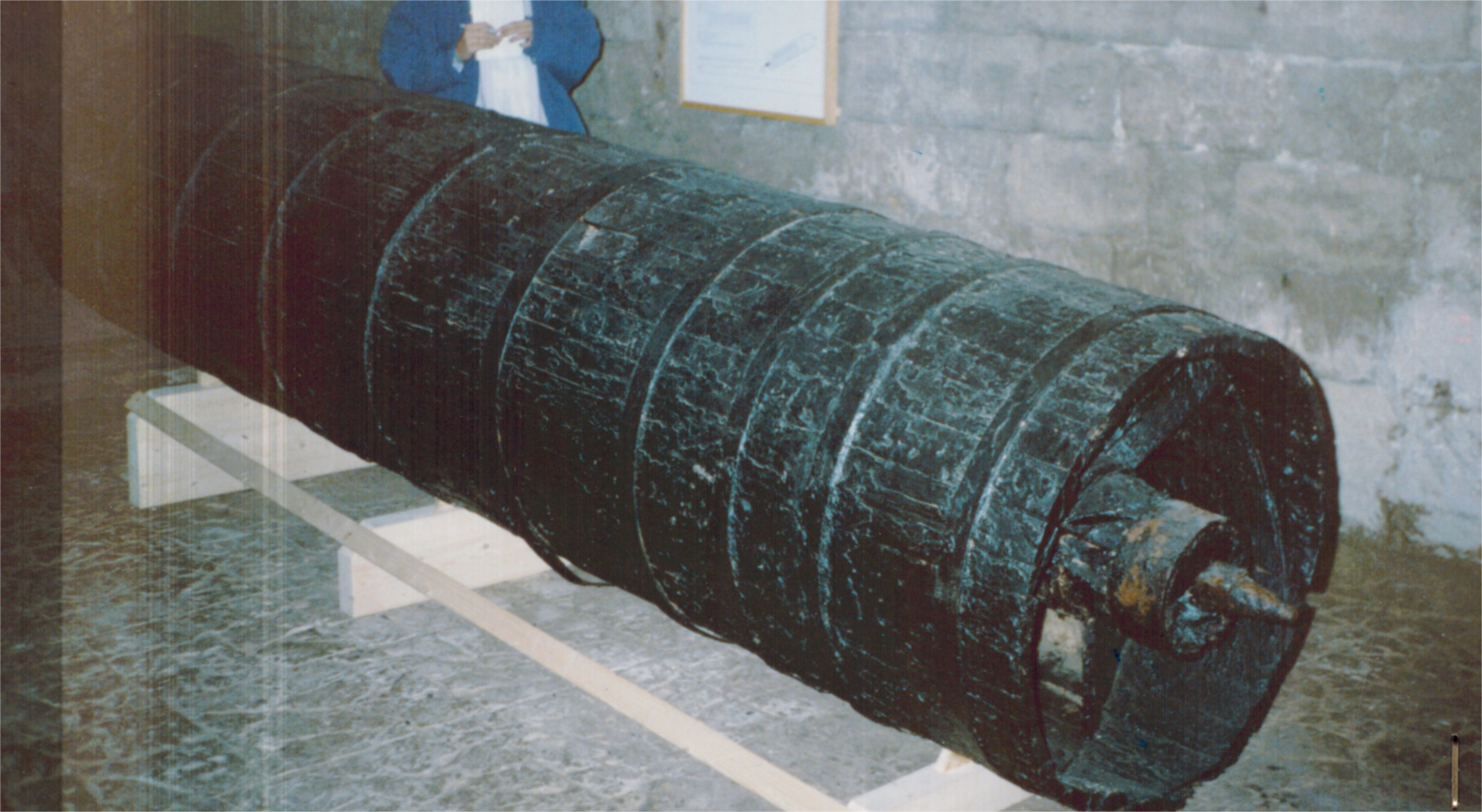
Old Archimedes' screw

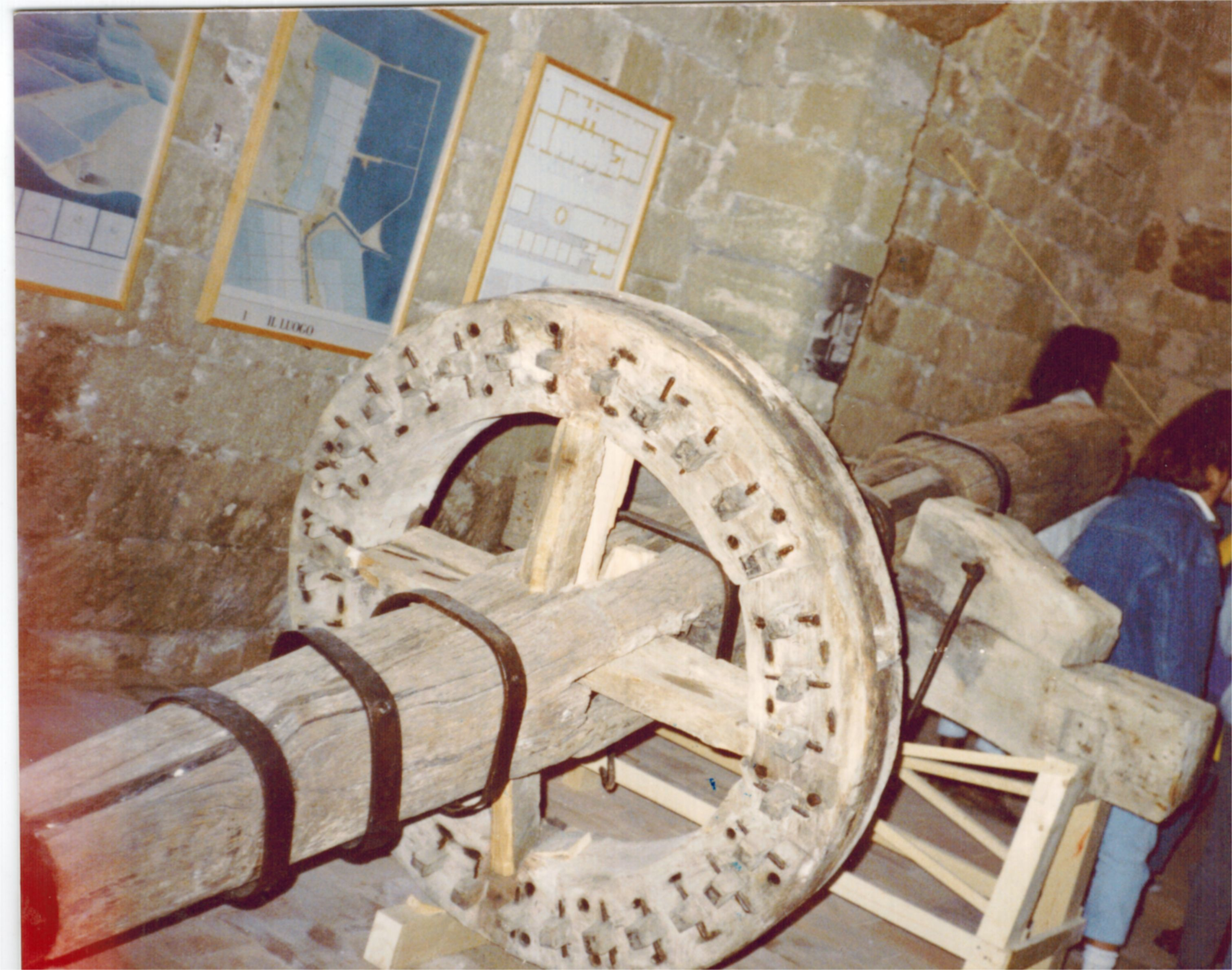
Shaft transmission wheel

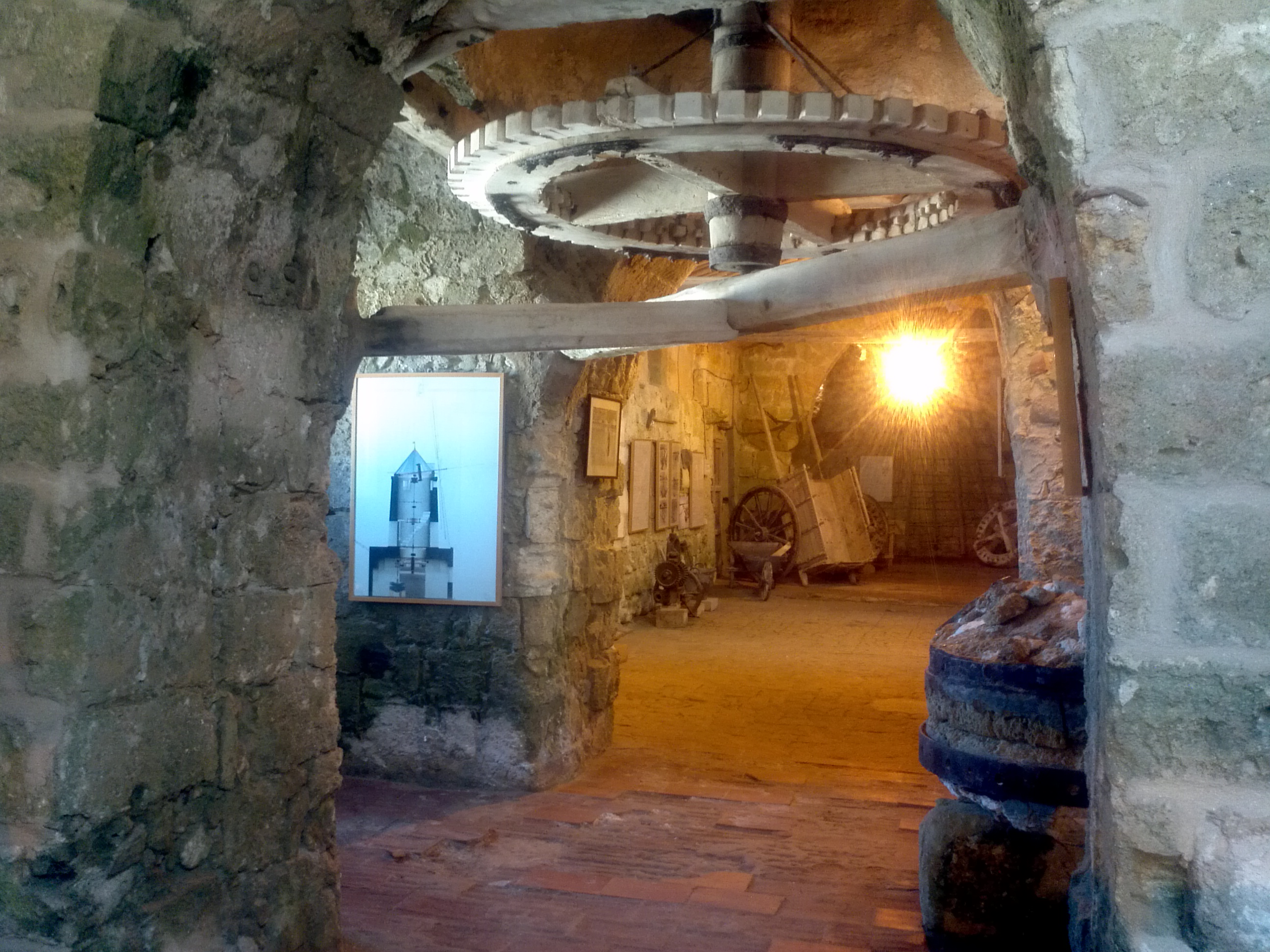
Shaft transmission wheel (in its working position)

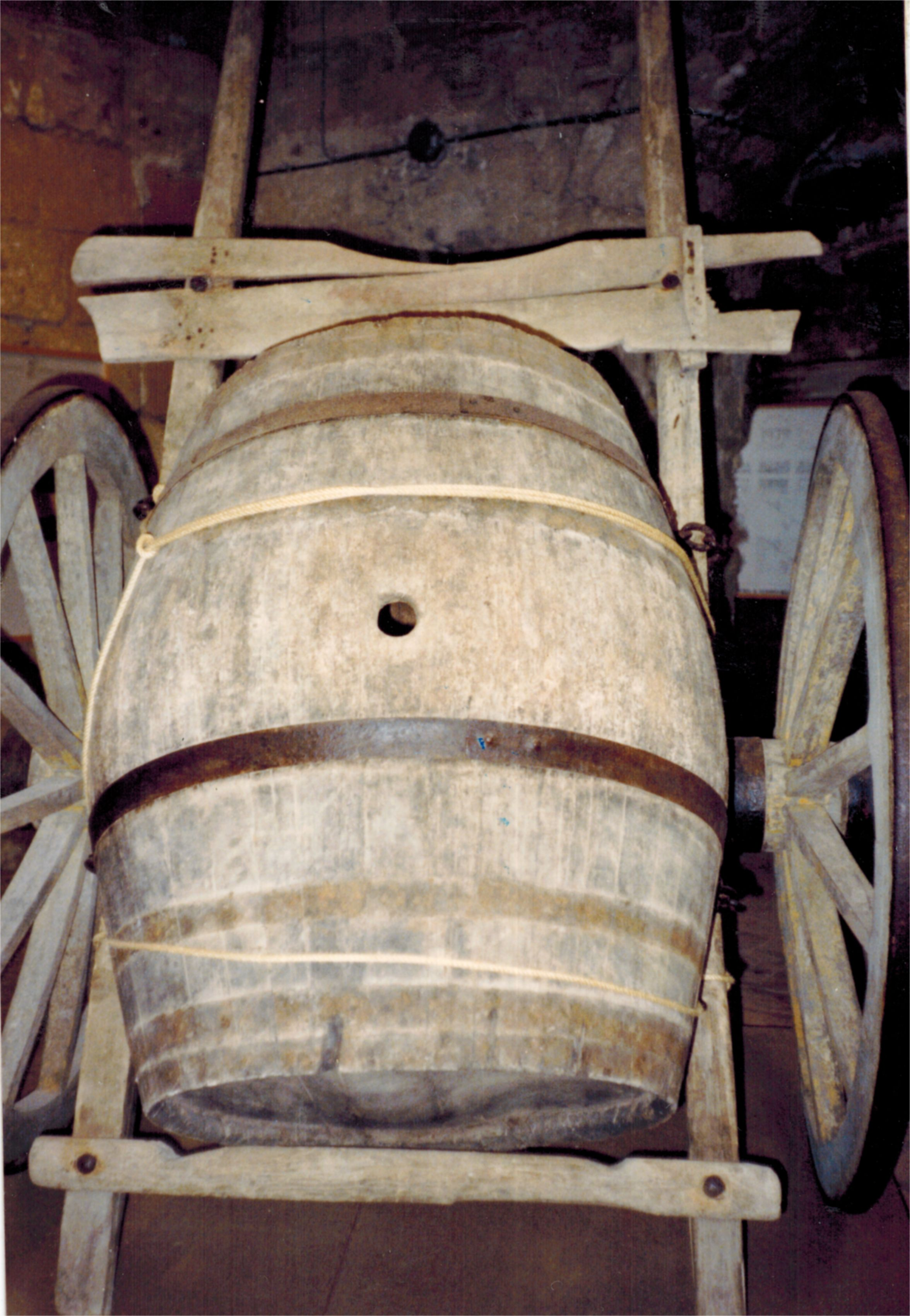
Water car (Carro dell'acqua)

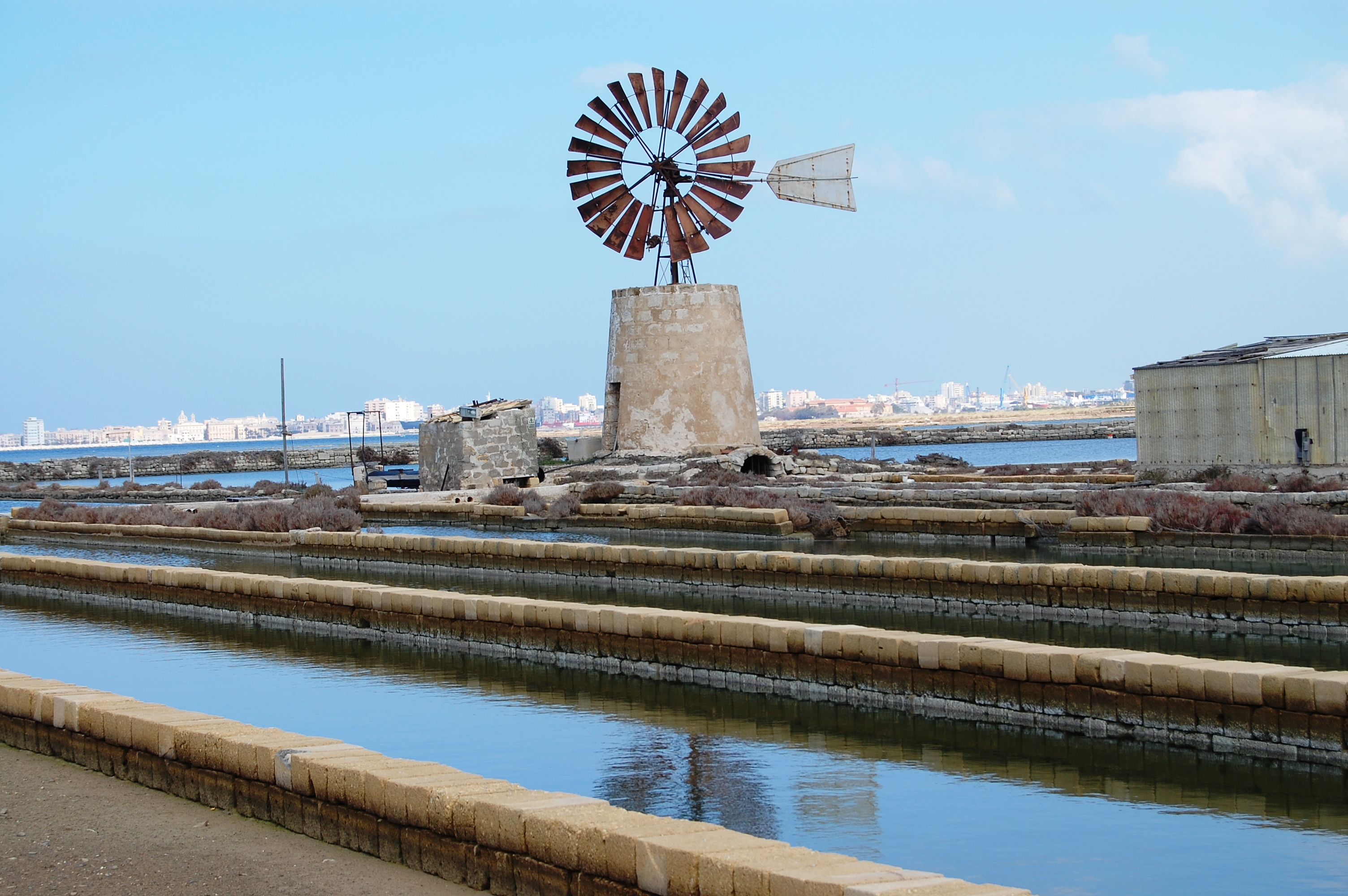
"American" water lifting mill
