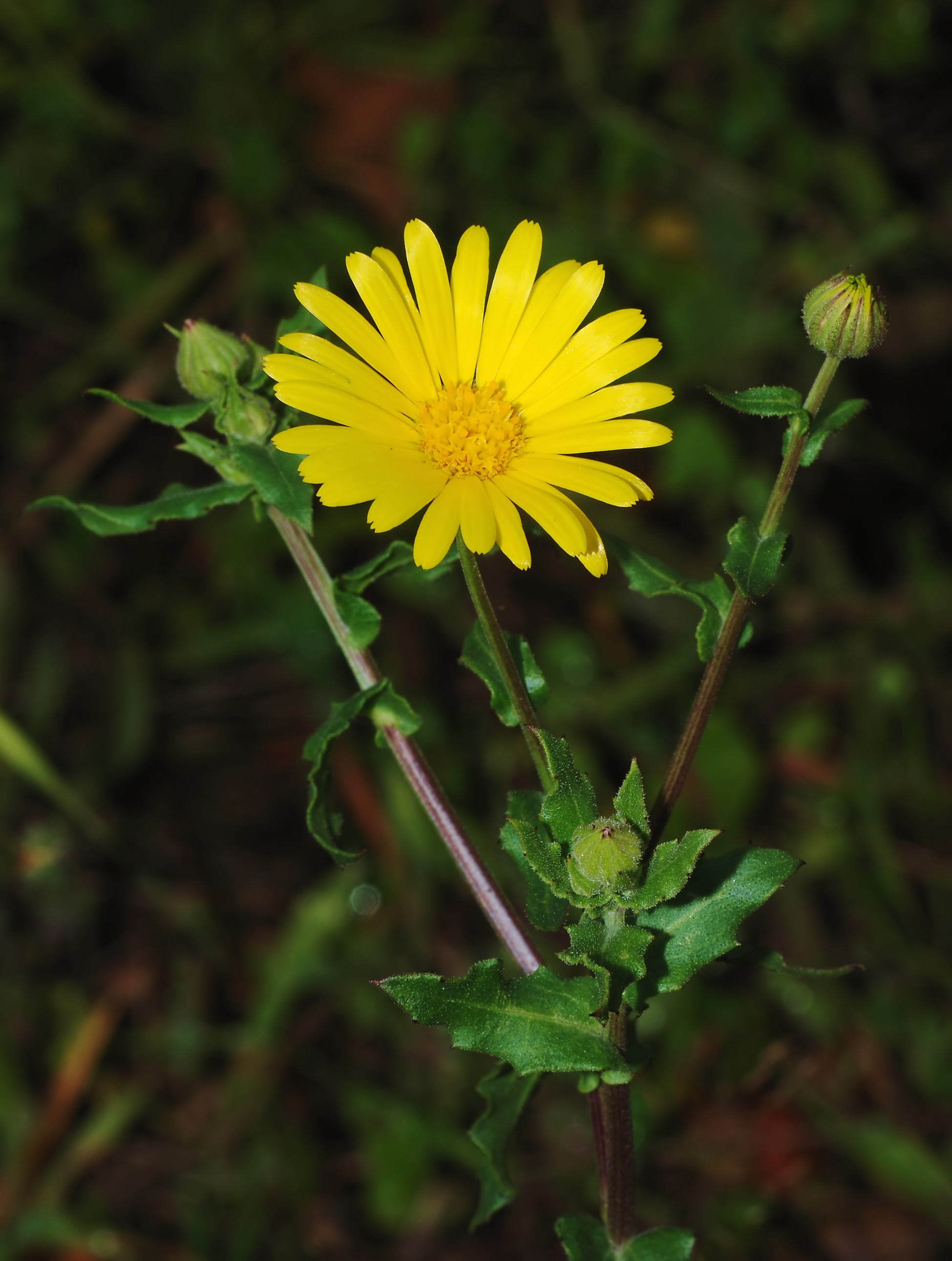

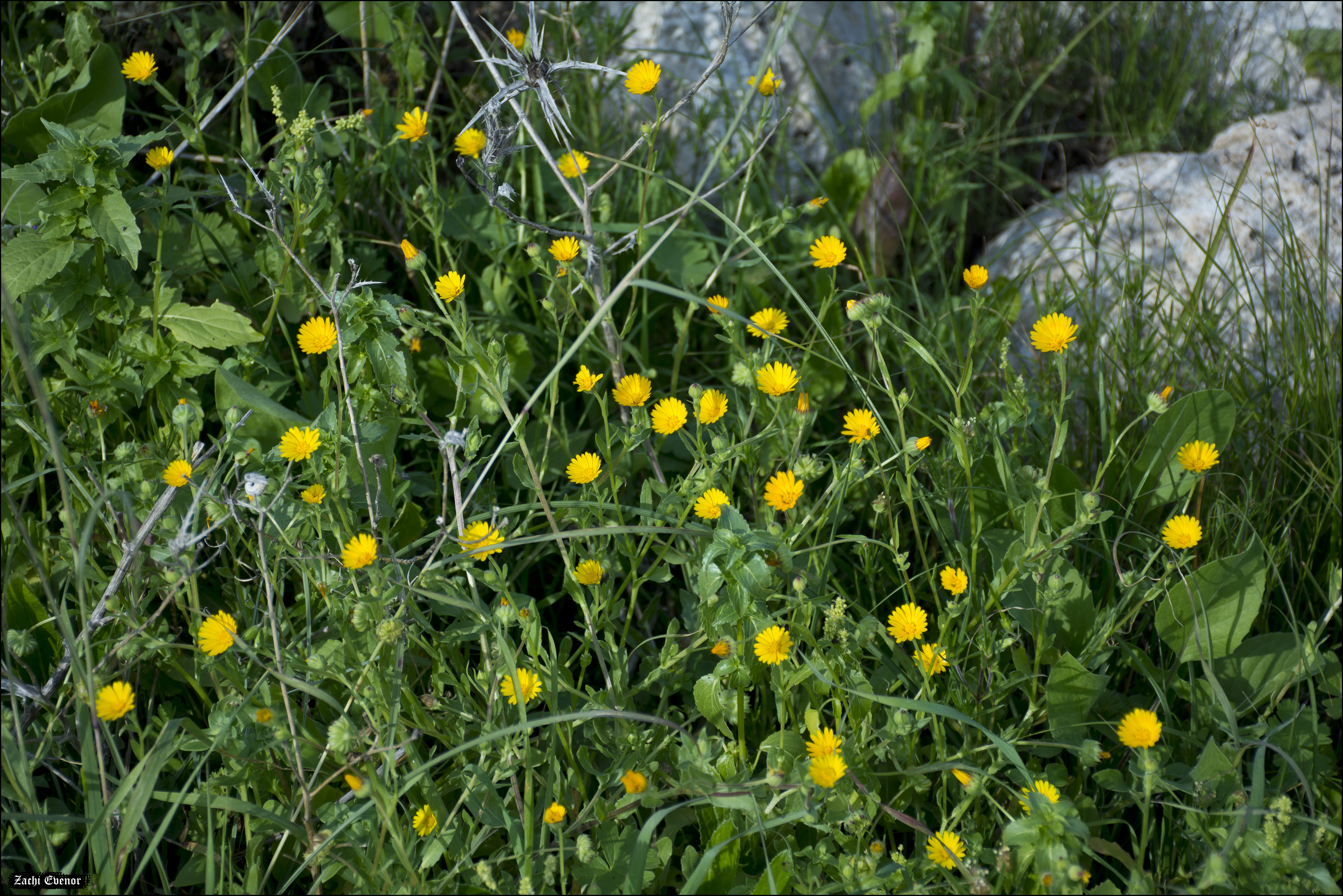

Scientific classification
- Kingdom: Plantae
- Clade: Tracheophytes
- Clade: Angiosperms
- Clade: Eudicots
- Clade: Asterids
- Order: Asterales
- Family: Asteraceae
- Genus: Calendula
- Species: C. arvensis

Binomial name
- Calendula arvensis (Vaill.) L.

Synonyms
- List: Calendula aegyptiaca Desf.; Calendula alata Rech.f.; Calendula algeriensis Boiss. & Reut.; Calendula amplexifolia Rchb.; Calendula arvensis var. macroptera (Rouy) O.Bolòs & Vigo; Calendula arvensis subsp. macroptera Rouy; Calendula bicolor Raf.; Calendula brachyglossa Rupr.; Calendula byzantina DC.; Calendula cristagalli Viv.; Calendula echinata DC.; Calendula gracilis DC.; Calendula malacitana Boiss. & Reut.; Calendula malvaecarpa Pomel; Calendula micrantha Boiss. & Noë; Calendula micrantha Tineo & Guss.; Calendula microcephala Kral. ex Rchb.; Calendula parviflora Raf.; Calendula persica C.A.Mey.; Calendula sancta L.; Calendula sancta subsp. crista-galli (Viv.) Gallego & Talavera; Calendula sicula DC.; Calendula subinermis Pomel; Calendula sublanata Rchb.f.; Calendula sylvestris Garsault; Calendula undulata J.Gay ex Gaudin; Caltha arvensis (L.) Moench; Caltha graveolens Gilib.

= Calendula arvensis =

Species of flowering plant

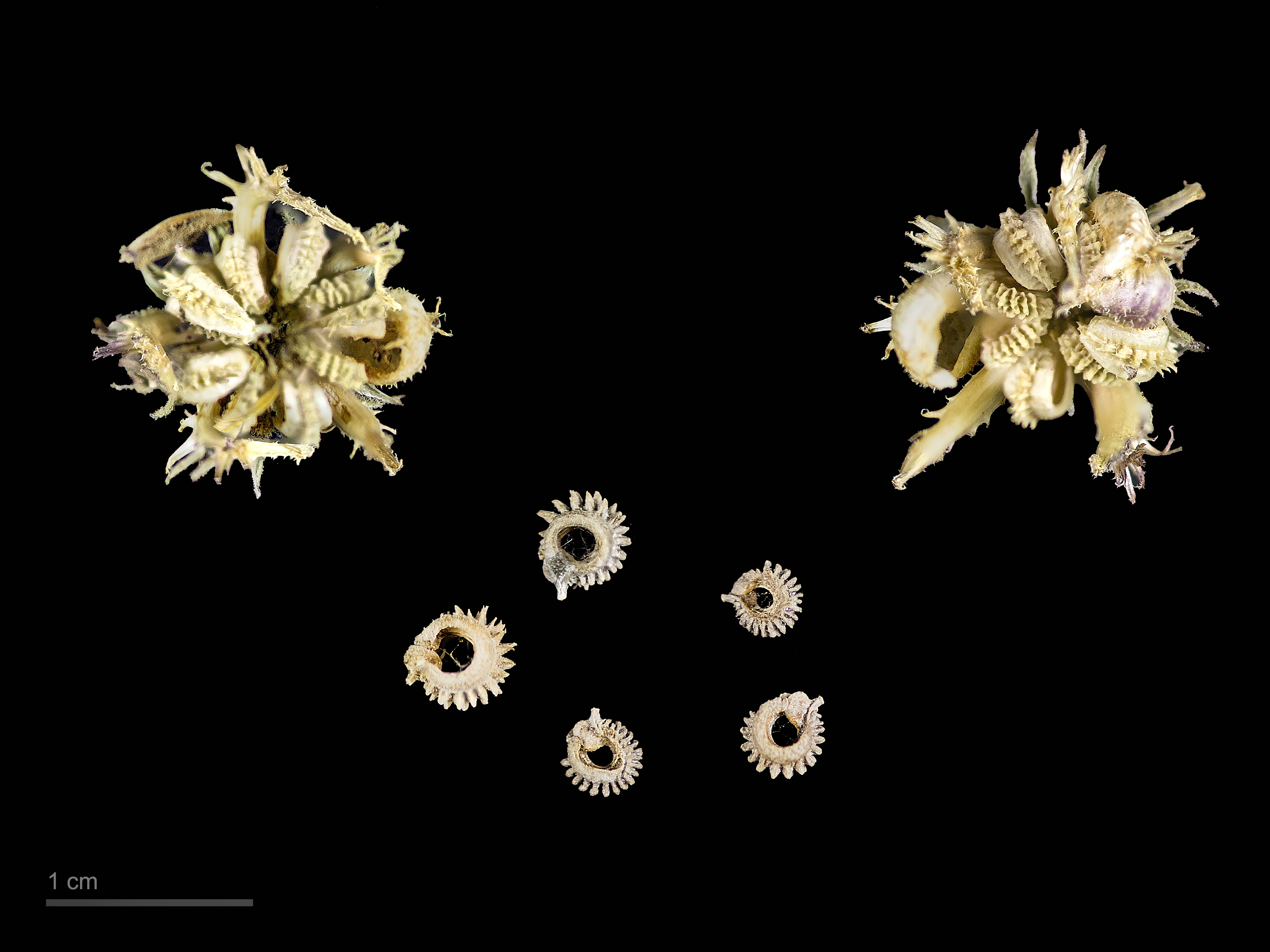
Calendula arvensis

Calendula arvensis is a species of flowering plant in the daisy family known by the common name field marigold. It is native to central and southern Europe, North Africa and the Middle East and it is known across the globe as an introduced species.

Calendula arvensis is an annual or biennial herb 10 to 50 cm (3.9 to 19.7 in) tall. The leaves are lance-shaped and borne on petioles from the slender, hairy stem. The inflorescence is a single flower head up to four centimeters wide with bright yellow to yellow-orange ray florets around a center of yellow disc florets. The fruit is an achene which can take any of three shapes, including ring-shaped, that facilitate different methods of dispersal.

== Achene ==
Calendula arvensis produce three types of achenes (fruits of the sunflower family), they are rostrate, cymbiform and annular. Rostrate and cymbiform are suitable for long-distance diffusion, because they have larger size and weight than annular, while annular is suitable for short-distance diffusion.
