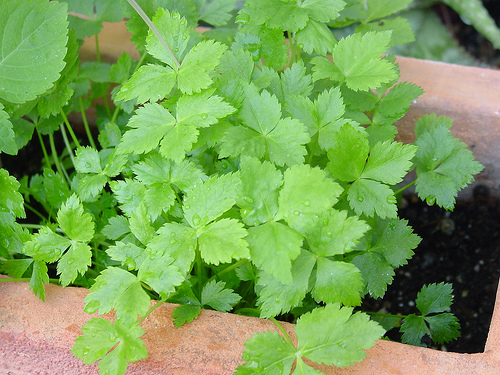
- Cryptotaenia japonica

Scientific classification
- Kingdom: Plantae
- Clade: Embryophytes
- Clade: Tracheophytes
- Clade: Spermatophytes
- Clade: Angiosperms
- Clade: Eudicots
- Clade: Asterids
- Order: Apiales
- Family: Apiaceae
- Subfamily: Apioideae
- Tribe: Oenantheae
- Genus: Cryptotaenia; DC.

Type species
- Cryptotaenia canadensis (L.) DC.

Synonyms
- Alacospermum Neck.; Deringa Adans.; Mesodiscus Raf.; Myrrha Mitch.

= Cryptotaenia =

Genus of flowering plants

Cryptotaenia, or honewort, is a genus of herbaceous perennial plants, native to North America, Africa, and eastern Asia, growing wild in moist, shady places.

== Species ==
Six species are accepted by Plants of the World Online as of February 2025. Other studies suggested that the African and Canary Island species should be moved to other genera and that the Italian endemic Lereschia thomasii should be included in Cryptotaenia. In 2016 the Canary Islands endemic Cryptotaenia elegans was moved to genus Daucus as Daucus elegans.

- Cryptotaenia africana (Hook.f.) Drude - Gabon
- Cryptotaenia calycina C.C.Towns. - Tanzania
- Cryptotaenia canadensis (L.) DC. - eastern + central North America
- Cryptotaenia flahaultii (Woronow) Koso-Pol. - Republic of Georgia
- Cryptotaenia japonica Hassk. - Japan, Korea, China
- Cryptotaenia polygama C.C.Towns. - Tanzania

=== Formerly placed here ===
- Daucus elegans (Webb ex Bolle) Spalik, Banasiak & Reduron (as Cryptotaenia elegans Webb ex Bolle)
