= Caucalis pumila =

Caucalis pumila may refer to two different taxa of plants:

- Caucalis pumila Willd., a synonym for Daucus carota subsp. maritimus (Lam.) Batt.
- Caucalis pumila L., a synonym for Daucus pumilus (L.) Hoffmanns. & Link
