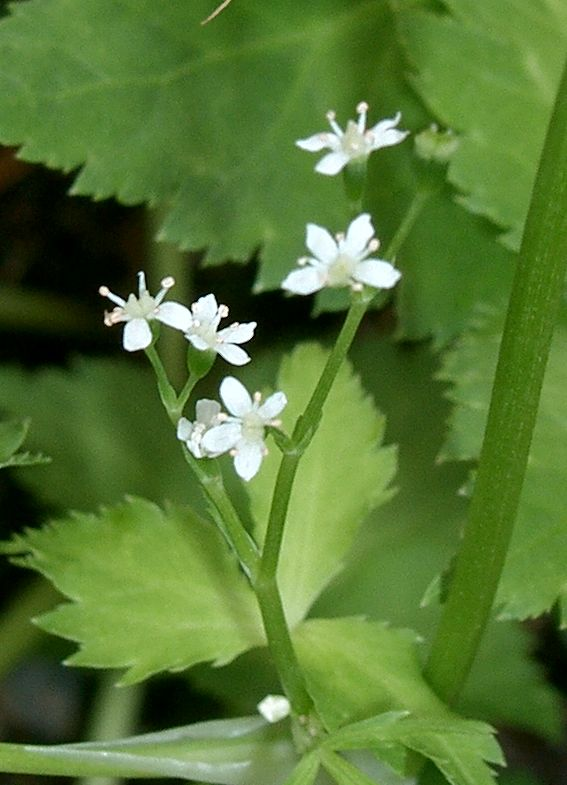

Scientific classification
- Kingdom: Plantae
- Clade: Tracheophytes
- Clade: Angiosperms
- Clade: Eudicots
- Clade: Asterids
- Order: Apiales
- Family: Apiaceae
- Genus: Cryptotaenia
- Species: C. japonica

Binomial name
- Cryptotaenia japonica Hassk.

Synonyms
- Deringa dissecta (Y.Yabe) Koso-Pol.; Deringa japonica (Hassk.) Koso-Pol.

= Cryptotaenia japonica =

Species of flowering plant

Cryptotaenia japonica, commonly called mitsuba, Japanese wild parsley and Japanese honewort among other names, is a herbaceous perennial plant in the celery family native to Japan, Korea and China. The plant is edible and is commonly used as a garnish and root vegetable in Japan, and other Asian countries. It is sometimes considered a subspecies of Cryptotaenia canadensis as Cryptotaenia canadensis subsp. japonica.

== Description ==
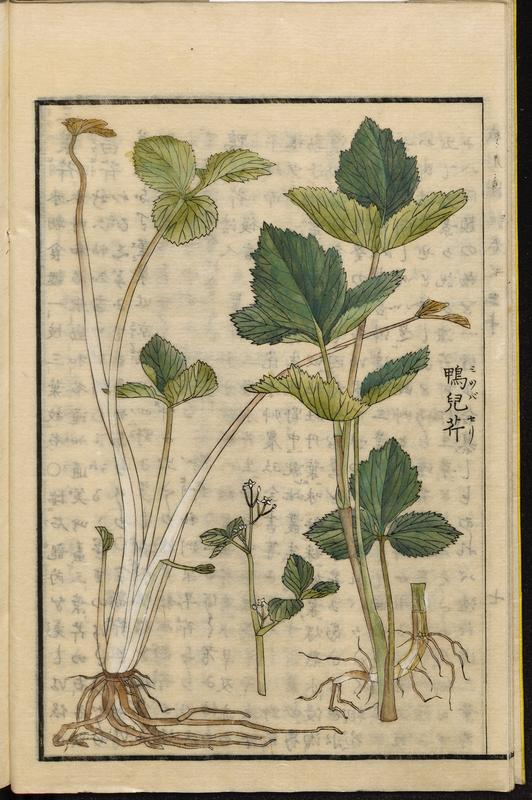
Illustration from the Japanese agricultural encyclopedia Seikei Zusetsu (1804)

Growing 30–100 centimetres (12–39 in) tall, its petiolate leaves are triangular or ovate and serrated, vaguely resembling parsley. It has short, lateral roots. It flowers in April or May and fruits from June to October. The flowers are white compound umbels and the fruits are schizocarps. Preferring moist, shady areas, it can be found on roadsides and in ditches, as well as damp areas of forests where it can be weedy.

== Names ==
The most common English names for Cryptotaenia japonica are mitsuba (from the Japanese), Japanese wild parsley and Japanese honewort. Other common names include white chervil, Japanese parsley, stone parsley, Japanese cryptotaenia and East Asian wild parsley.

In Mandarin Chinese, the plant is usually called yāér qín (鴨兒芹, lit. "duckling celery") in China, but more commonly soaⁿ-khîn-chʰài (山芹菜, lit. "mountain celery") in Taiwan. Other common Chinese names are yě shǔkuí (野蜀葵 (Note: These Chinese characters are used for the Japanese name mitsubazeri as well.)) and sānyè qín (三葉芹). In Japanese, the plant is called mitsuba (三つ葉, lit. "trefoil" or "three-leaved") or mitsubazeri (野蜀葵). In Korean, the plant is called padeudeuk namul (파드득나물) or bandi namul (반디나물), with both names referring to its culinary function as a namul herb.

== Uses ==
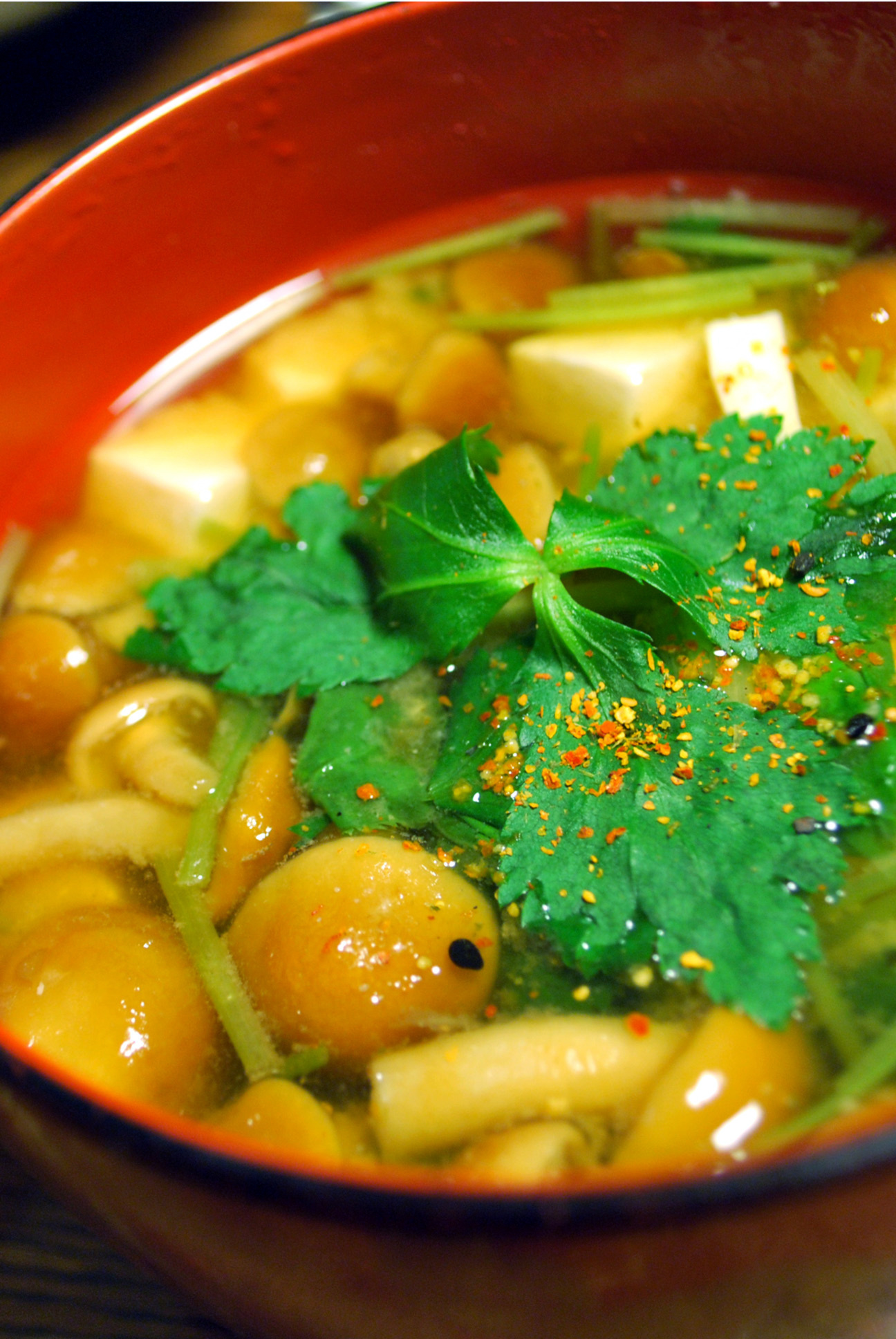
Miso soup with mitsuba and nameko

Cryptotaenia japonica has both culinary and traditional medical uses. It is raised as a seasoning (similar to angelica). Like parsley, the flavor is clean and refreshing with a slightly bitter taste which some describe as celery-like. The sprouts are used in salads and soup.

In Japan, it is commonly used as a garnish in soups or atop entrees or as a sushi ingredient. The white stems are blanched while they're tender, and have a taste similar to coriander. Two main regional varieties exist, the green Kansai type, and the white Kantō type.

Mitsuba's dark green leaves, stems, and pods have an extensive nutritional profile, including high levels of calcium and vitamin C.
