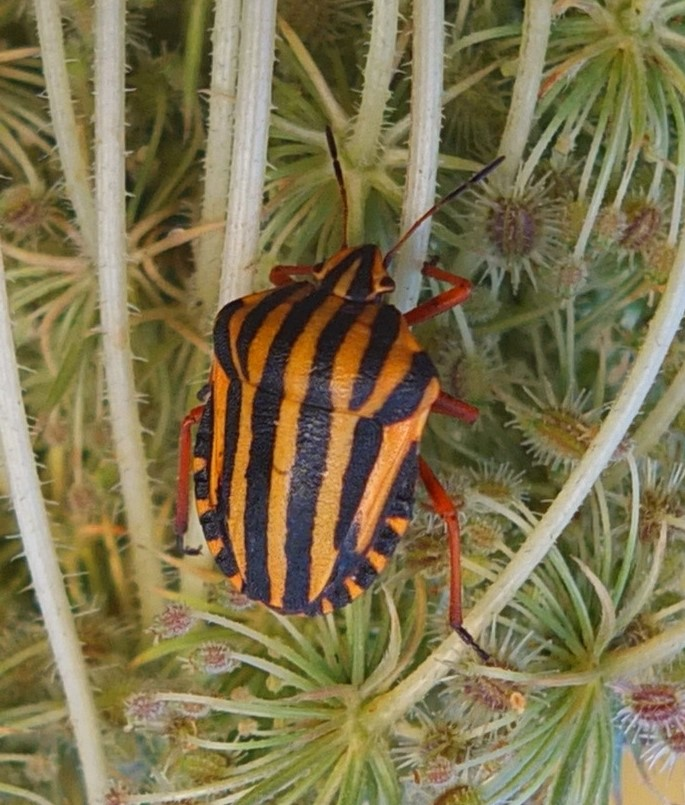
- Graphosoma lineatum lineatum

Scientific classification
- Kingdom: Animalia
- Phylum: Arthropoda
- Class: Insecta
- Order: Hemiptera
- Suborder: Heteroptera
- Family: Pentatomidae
- Genus: Graphosoma
- Species: G. lineatum

Binomial name
- Graphosoma lineatum (Linnaeus, 1758)

Synonyms
- Cimex lineatus Linnaeus, 1758

= Graphosoma lineatum =

Species of true bug

Graphosoma lineatum, also known as the north african striped bug, is a species of shield bug in the family Pentatomidae.

== Description ==
Graphosoma lineatum can reach a length of 8–12 mm (0.31–0.47 in). The body is almost round, with a large shield. The basic color of the upperside of the body is orange yellow, with wide black longitudinal stripes. The pronotum has six black bands. The antennae are black. Also the sides of the abdominal segments (connexivum) are yellow with many small black spots. The legs are mostly orange, which distinguishes it from its relative, G. italicum.

== Taxonomy ==
Graphosoma italicum had been regarded as either a subspecies, or a synonym of G. lineatum, but the validity of G. italicum was reestablished via DNA analysis, which demonstrated that the sister species to G. italicum is G. rubrolineatum, while G. lineatum is more closely related to G. semipunctatum.

== Subspecies ==
- Graphosoma lineatum lineatum (Linnaeus, 1758) - nominate subspecies
- Graphosoma lineatum siciliensis Lupoli, 2017 - endemic to Sicily. Black legged, more reddish coloured; only occurrence of the species in Europe, it actually looks close to its European relative, G. italicum.

== Similar species ==
- Graphosoma italicum (Müller, 1766) - The legs are black. The distribution is throughout Europe and Sardinia.
- Graphosoma semipunctatum (Fabricius, 1775) - The legs are orange, the red and black bands are interrupted on the pronotum, where they form black points. The distribution is restricted to the Mediterranean region.
- Graphosoma melanoxanthum Horvath, 1903 - Dark connexivi with small red points, it is distributed in South Russia, Turkey, and Iran.

== Distribution ==
Graphosoma lineatum is distributed across Northern Africa (Morocco, Algeria, Tunisia). The subspecies G. l. siciliensis occurs only in Sicily.
