= Daucus maritimus =

Daucus maritimus may refer to three different taxa of plants:

- Daucus maritimus With., a synonym for Daucus carota subsp. carota L.
- Daucus maritimus Lam., a synonym for Daucus carota subsp. maritimus (Lam.) Batt.
- Daucus maritimus (L.) Gaertn., a synonym for Daucus pumilus (L.) Hoffmanns. & Link
