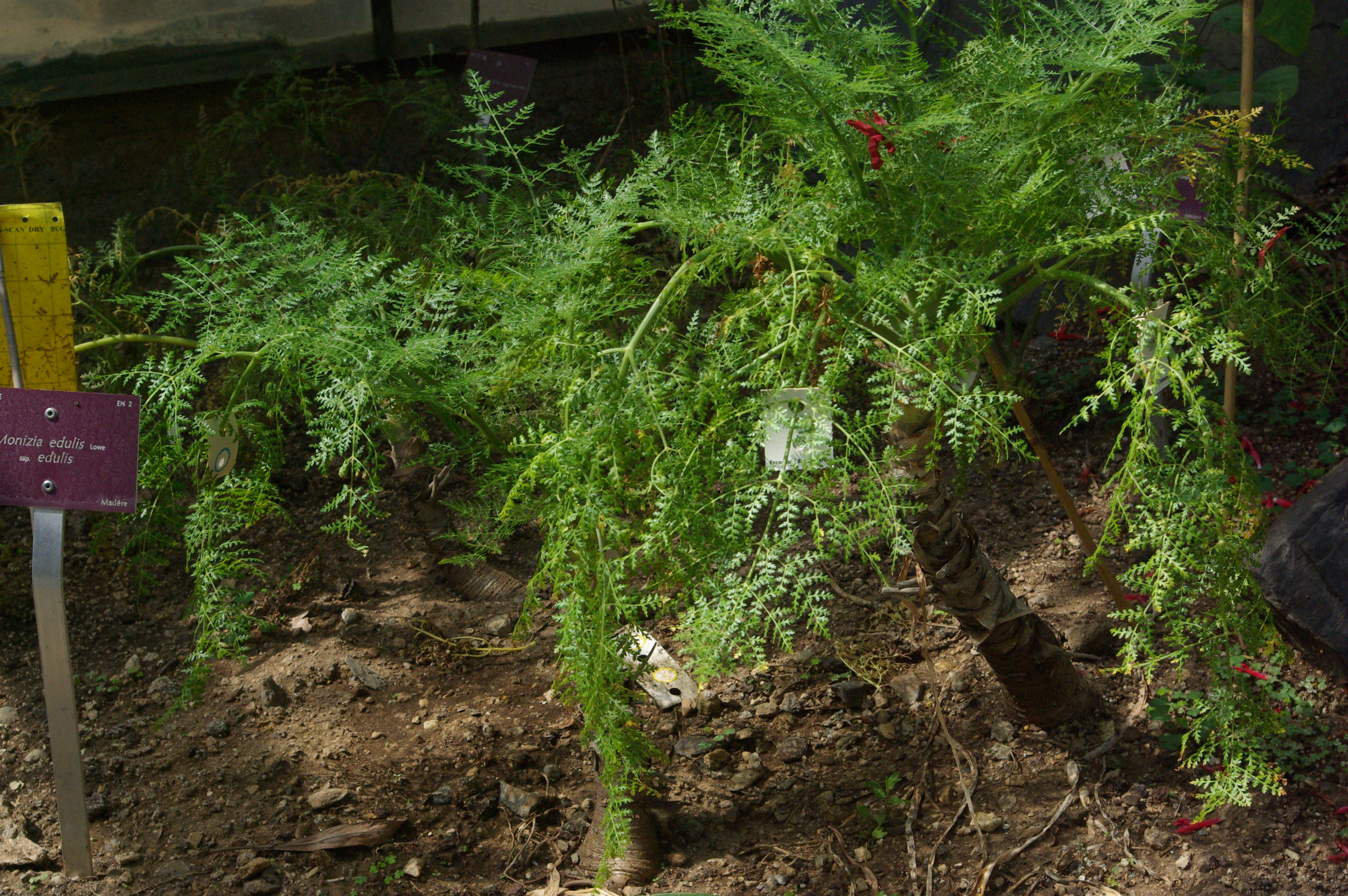

Conservation status
- Critically Endangered (IUCN 3.1)

Scientific classification
- Kingdom: Plantae
- Clade: Tracheophytes
- Clade: Angiosperms
- Clade: Eudicots
- Clade: Asterids
- Order: Apiales
- Family: Apiaceae
- Genus: Daucus
- Species: D. edulis

Binomial name
- Daucus edulis (Lowe)

Synonyms
- Monizia edulis Lowe; Monizia edulis subsp. giranus J. A. Carvalho & F. Fern.; Monizia edulis subsp. isambertoi F. Fern. & J. A. Carvalho; Monizia edulis subsp. santosii F. Fern. & J. A. Carvalho; Thapsia decipiens Hook. fil.; Thapsia edulis Nichols.; Thapsia melanoselina Masf.

= Daucus edulis =

Species of plant

Daucus edulis (Portuguese: Cenoura-da-rocha) is a critically endangered species of flowering plant in the celery family Apiaceae. It is endemic to Madeira.

== Description ==
Daucus edulis is a long-lived perennial plant, up to 1 metre (3.3 ft) in height. It has a hard woody unbranched stem with annual flowers and light yellowish-green, markedly shiny radial leaves, broadly triangular at the edges with pubescent petioles. It has scattered, paniculate inflorescences. Its fruits are 10–14 by 5–7 millimetres (0.39 in–0.55 in × 0.20 in–0.28 in), oblong to ellipsoid, pubescent and pale when ripe.

The species was previously known as Monizia edulis.

== Distribution and habitat ==
The species is endemic to Madeira Island and Deserta Grande Island and was once native to the Savage Islands. In 2008 its population was estimated to be around 50 individuals in a 226 square kilometres (87 sq mi) area. It extends from the Central Mountain Massif of Madeira and occupies rocky cliffs and terraces with soil accumulations up to 300 metres (980 ft) a.s.l. in Deserta Grande and up to 1,500 metres (4,900 ft) in Madeira.

It is mainly threatened by the introduction of exotic species, human collection, fires, droughts, storms, and landslides.

== Gallery ==
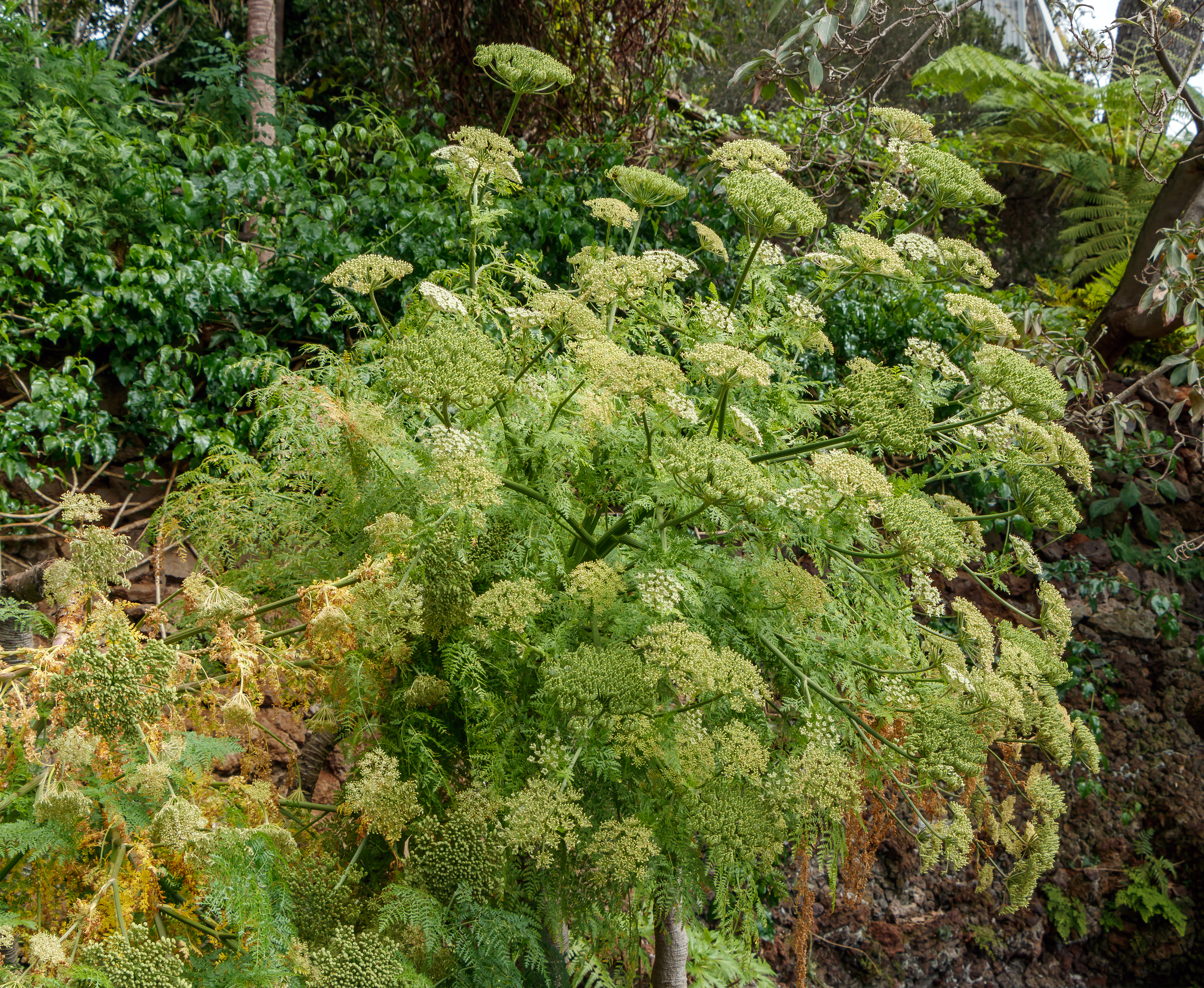

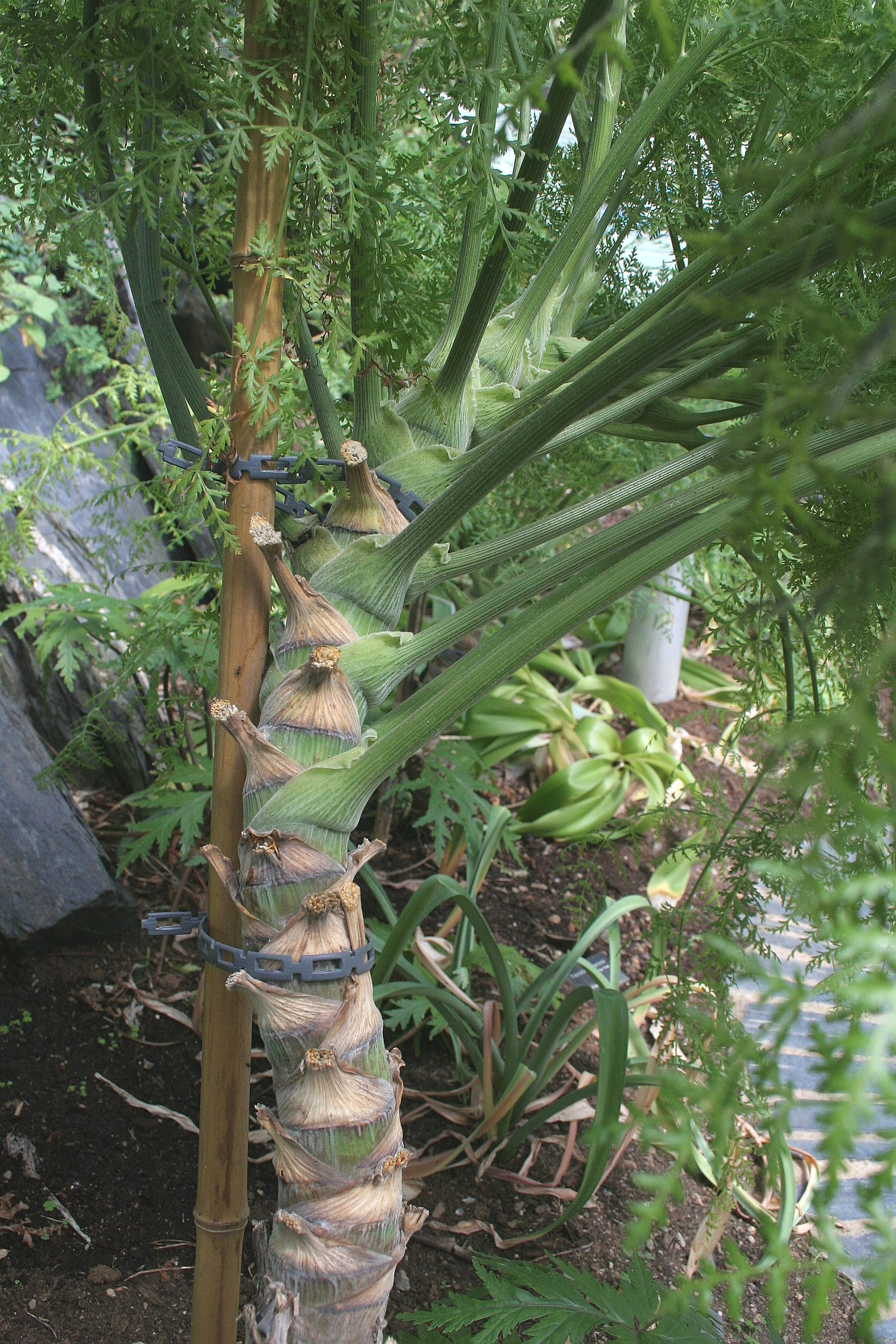

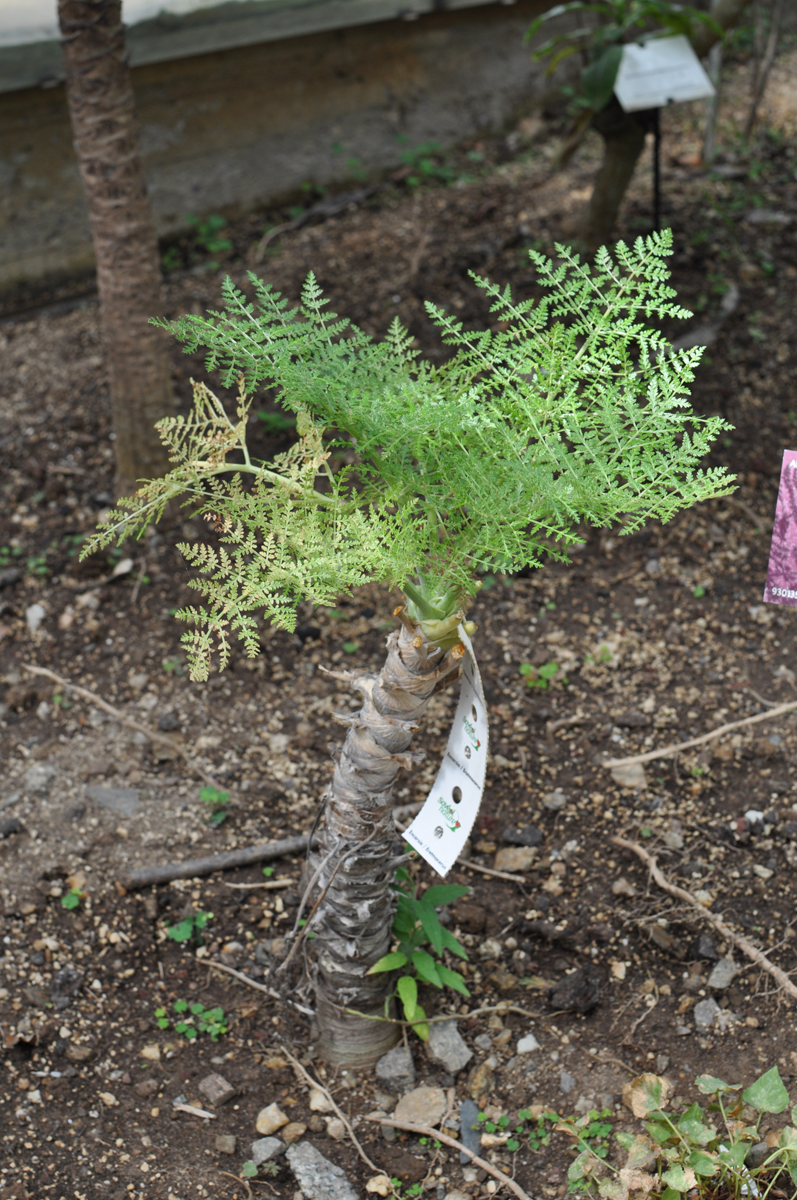
