= Daucus bicolor =

Scientific classification
- Kingdom: Plantae
- Clade: Tracheophytes
- Clade: Angiosperms
- Clade: Eudicots
- Clade: Asterids
- Order: Apiales
- Family: Apiaceae
- Genus: Daucus
- Species: D. bicolor

Binomial name
- Daucus bicolor Sm.

Species of flowering plant

Daucus bicolor is a species of Daucus, in the family Apiaceae. Its stems range from 20 to 60 centimeters.

== Description and distribution ==
It is found in western Turkey.

The first scientific description of this species, by James Edward Smith, was published in 1806 in the Prodromus to the Flora Graeca.; a fuller description appeared in the full edition, in 1819.
