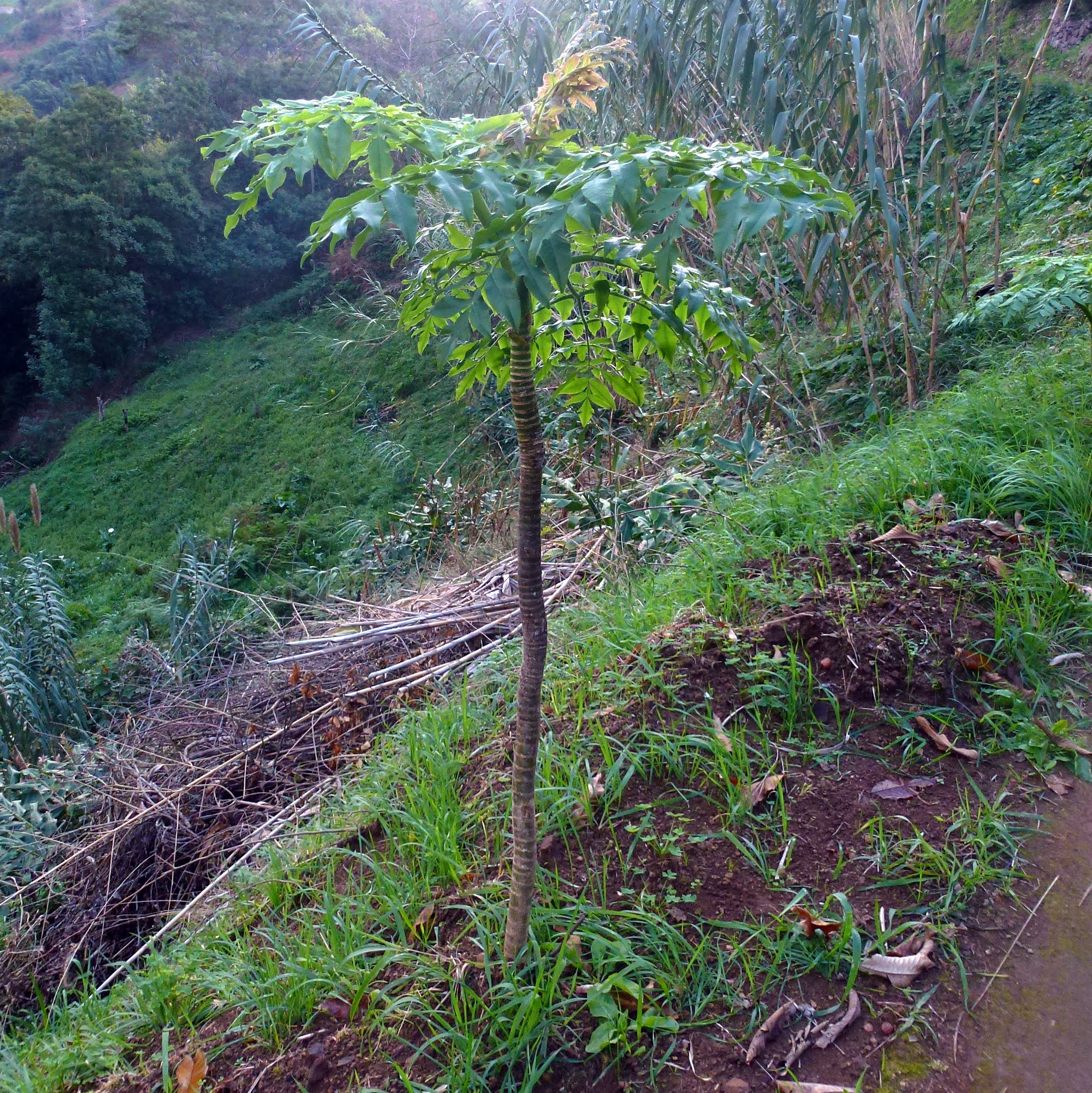

Scientific classification
- Kingdom: Plantae
- Clade: Tracheophytes
- Clade: Angiosperms
- Clade: Eudicots
- Clade: Asterids
- Order: Apiales
- Family: Apiaceae
- Genus: Daucus
- Species: D. decipiens

Binomial name
- Daucus decipiens (Schrad. & J.C.Wendl.) Spalik, Wojew., Banasiak & Reduron, 2016

Synonyms
- Laserpitium decipiens (Schrad. & J.C.Wendl.) Koso-Pol.; Melanoselinum decipiens (Schrad. & J.C.Wendl.) Hoffm.; Selinum decipiens Schrad. & J.C.Wendl.; Bubon galbanum Steud.; Selinum frutescens Pers.

= Daucus decipiens =

Species of carrot

Daucus decipiens, the parsnip palm, black parsley, tree angelica, or non-stinging hogweed, is a species of plant in the family Apiaceae.

== Description ==
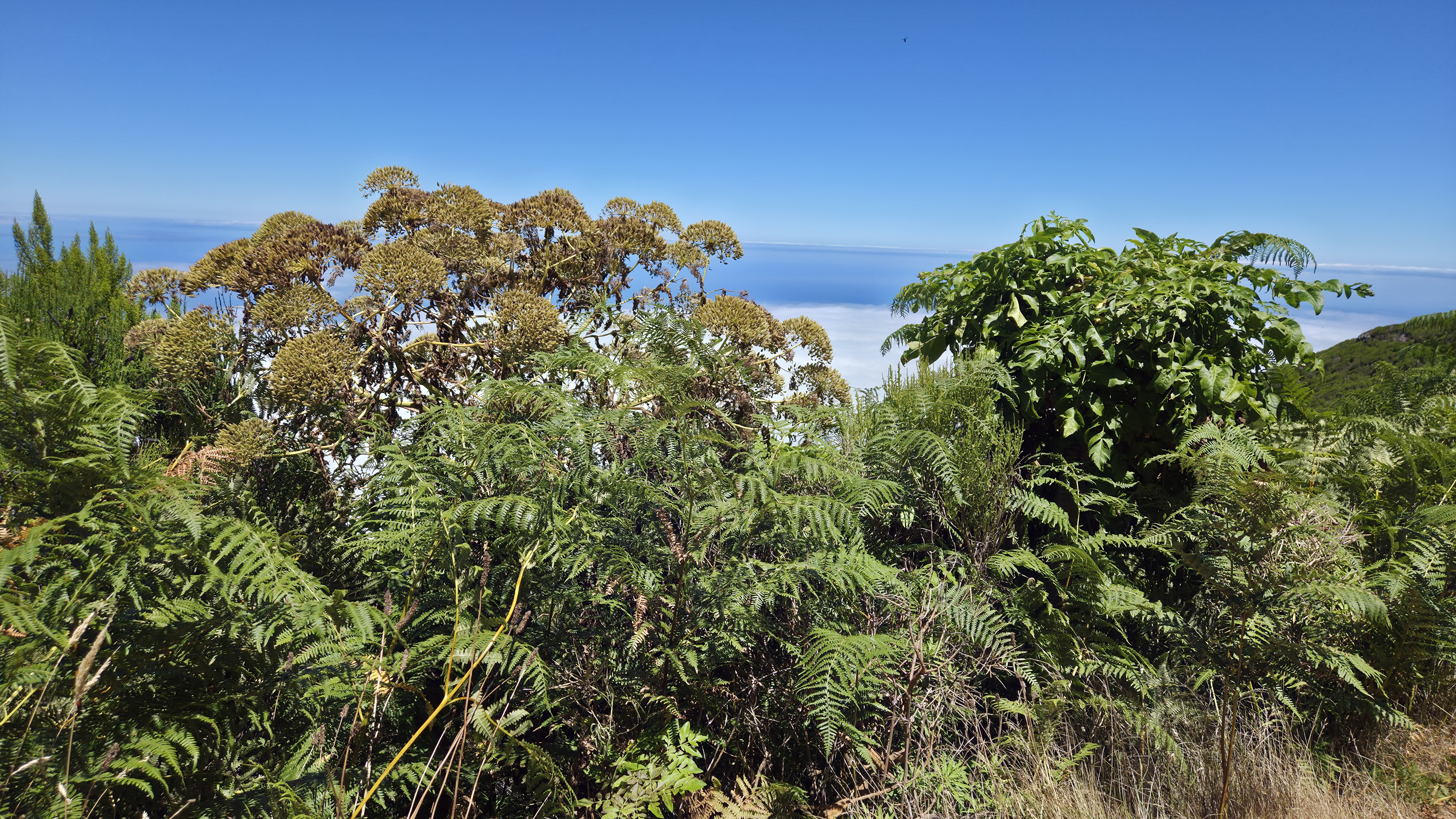
Plant with seeds (left) and during growth (right)

A large plant that grows with a spreading crown and a woody stem, like a New Zealand cabbage tree. It flowers from November to January in the Southern hemisphere.

The seeds can live for up to a year. The species is biennial or perennial.

=== Full description ===
Erect biennial or perennial. Stems up to 2 m high and 4 cm diam., woody and leafless in lower parts with distinct lf scars, with pith in centre and hollow in parts. Stem lvs with fine hairs on rachis and midribs, otherwise glabrous, 2–3-pinnate (seedling lvs 1-pinnate); ultimate segments ovate to lanceolate, pinnatisect or not lobed, serrate, 15–20 mm long, shortly petiolulate or sessile; lvs of infl.-branches much reduced; petiole sparsely to moderately hairy, striate. Umbels up to 20 cm diam.; rays numerous; bracts 10–12, narrowly ovate-lanceolate, sometimes serrate, up to 5 cm long; bracteoles 7–12, lanceolate. Fls numerous, white to purplish. Fr. dark brown, sparsely hairy, 12–18 mm long.

== Taxonomy ==
This plant was previously described as Melanosilenum decipiens.

== Range ==
It is native to Madeira, Portugal and introduced to Great Britain and to New Zealand in 1969. It is considered an invasive pest in the Wellington area, and is in both the North and South Islands.

== Habitat ==
It likes sunny, well-drained areas. It can grow well along roadsides.
