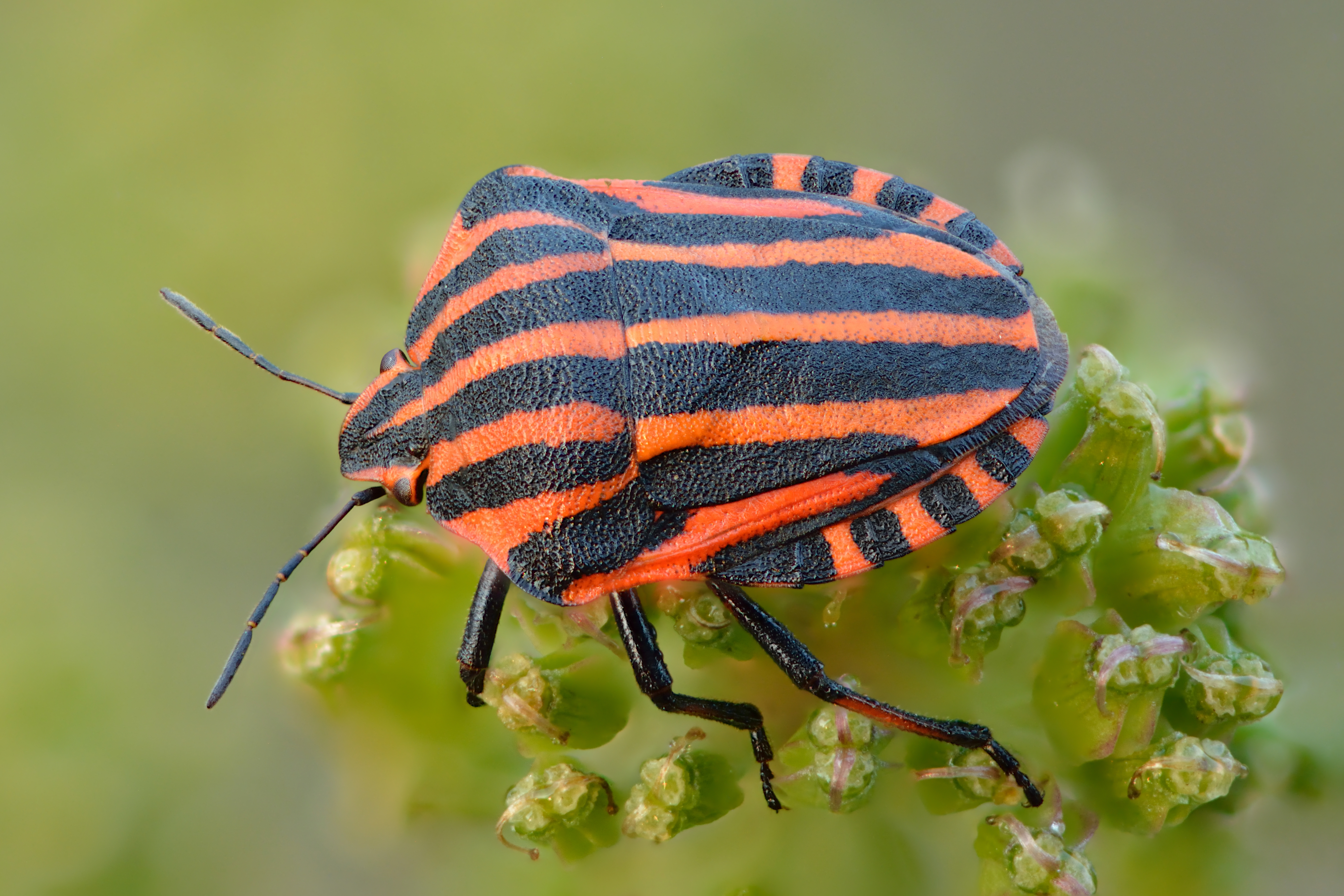

Scientific classification
- Kingdom: Animalia
- Phylum: Arthropoda
- Clade: Pancrustacea
- Class: Insecta
- Order: Hemiptera
- Suborder: Heteroptera
- Family: Pentatomidae
- Genus: Graphosoma
- Species: G. italicum

Binomial name
- Graphosoma italicum (Müller, 1766)

Synonyms
- List: Cimex italicus Müller, 1766; Cimex nigrolineatus Fabricius, 1781; Tetyra schangini Gebler, 1817; Scutellara lineata v. flavipes Mulsant & Rey, 1865; Graphosoma lineatum v. reductum Horváth, 1901; Graphosoma italicum v. ochraceum Royer, 1923; Graphosoma italicum v. obscurum Stipanek, 1926; Graphosoma italicum f. soosi Halaszfy, 1953; Graphosoma italicum v. nigriscutellatum Halaszfy, 1955; Graphosoma italicum f. flavolineatum Halaszfy, 1955

= Graphosoma italicum =

Species of true bug

Graphosoma italicum is a species of shield bug in the family Pentatomidae. It is also known as the striped bug (or Italian striped bug) and minstrel bug.

== Description ==
G. italicum can reach a length of 8–12 mm (0.31–0.47 in). The body is almost round, with a large shield. The basic color of the upperside of the body is red, with wide black longitudinal stripes. The pronotum has six black bands. The antennae are black. Also the sides of the abdominal segments (connexivum) are red with many small black spots. The legs are mostly black, which distinguishes it from its relative, G. lineatum.

== Taxonomy ==
Graphosoma italicum had been regarded as either a subspecies, or a synonym, of G. lineatum for over 100 years, so nearly all of the existing literature prior to 2007 referred to this species under the name lineatum. The validity of G. italicum was reestablished via DNA analysis, which demonstrated that the sister species to G. italicum is G. rubrolineatum, while G. lineatum is more closely related to G. semipunctatum.

== Subspecies ==
- G. i. italicum (Müller, 1766) - nominate subspecies
- G. i. sardiniensis Lupoli, 2017 - with reddish legs, similar to G. lineatum, and endemic to Sardinia.

== Similar species ==
- Graphosoma lineatum (Linnaeus, 1758) - The legs are orange. The distribution is restricted to Northern Africa and Sicily.
- Graphosoma semipunctatum (Fabricius, 1775) - The legs are orange, the red and black bands are interrupted on the pronotum, where they form black points. The distribution is restricted to the Mediterranean region.
- Graphosoma melanoxanthum Horvath, 1903 - Dark connexivi with small red points, it is distributed in South Russia, Turkey, and Iran.

== Distribution ==
G. italicum is distributed across the Western Palearctic and occurs in the entire Mediterranean area, with the northern limit of distribution fluctuating strongly. In recent decades, the northern border in western and central Europe has expanded strongly to the north, so that the species now occurs as far as the North Sea and Baltic Sea (Jutland and southern Finland). In Germany, the type occurs everywhere with exception of the northwest and is not rare regionally. In Austria, it is widespread, but only locally frequent. The insects populate open to half-shady areas in dry to more humid habitats. The subspecies G. i. sardiniensis occurs only in Sardinia.

== Biology ==
G. italicum is an insect of warm and sunny areas. It prefers warm slopes and meadows located on south-facing slopes. The orange and black warning colours (aposematism) indicate that the insects are foul-tasting, protecting them from predators. The nymphs do not have the orange-black stripe pattern, instead they are mostly brownish. These shield bugs are frequently found on the umbels of Apiaceae (Daucus, Heracleum, Anthriscus, Foeniculum, etc.), plants which themselves are chemically-protected.

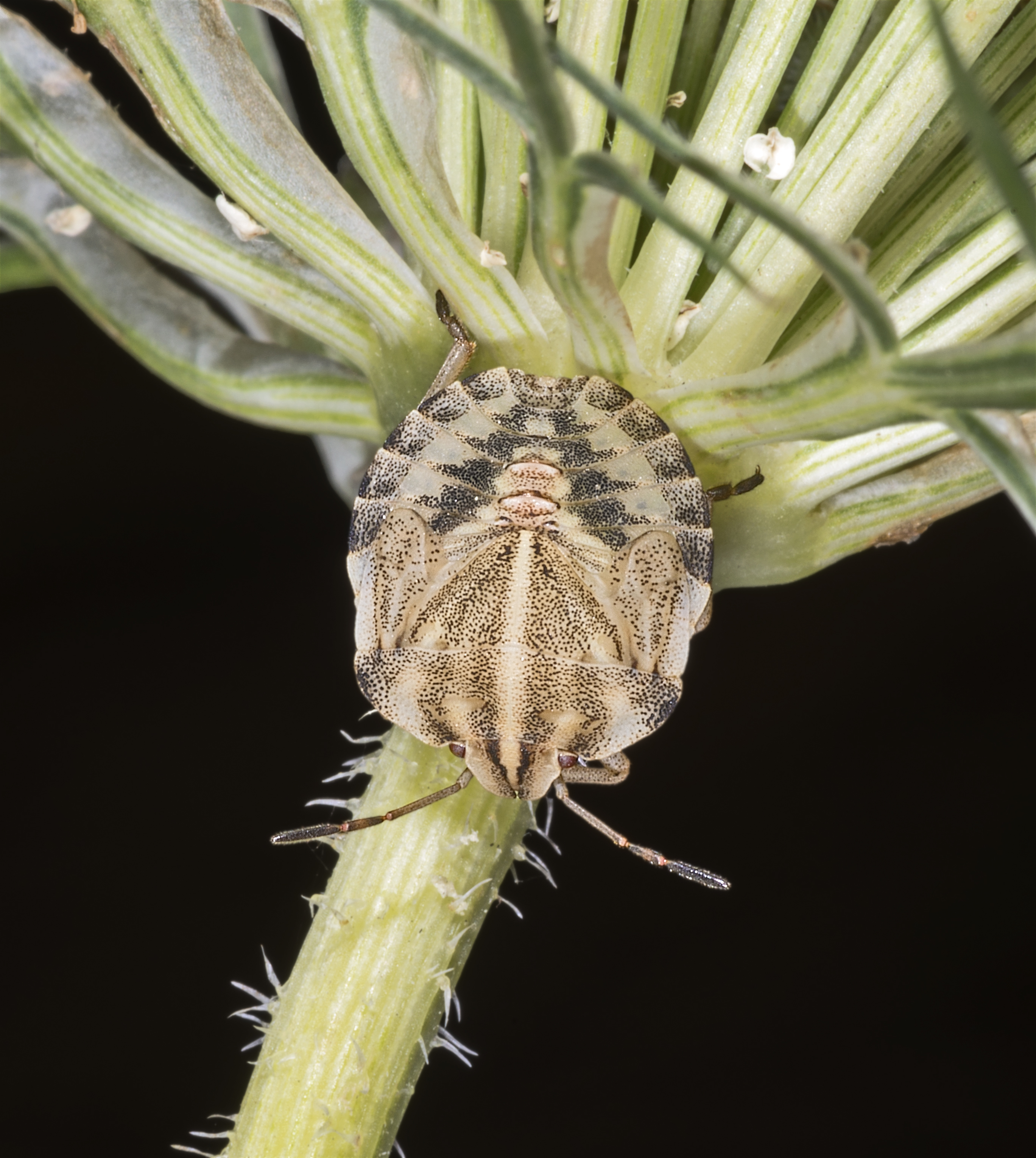
Nymph

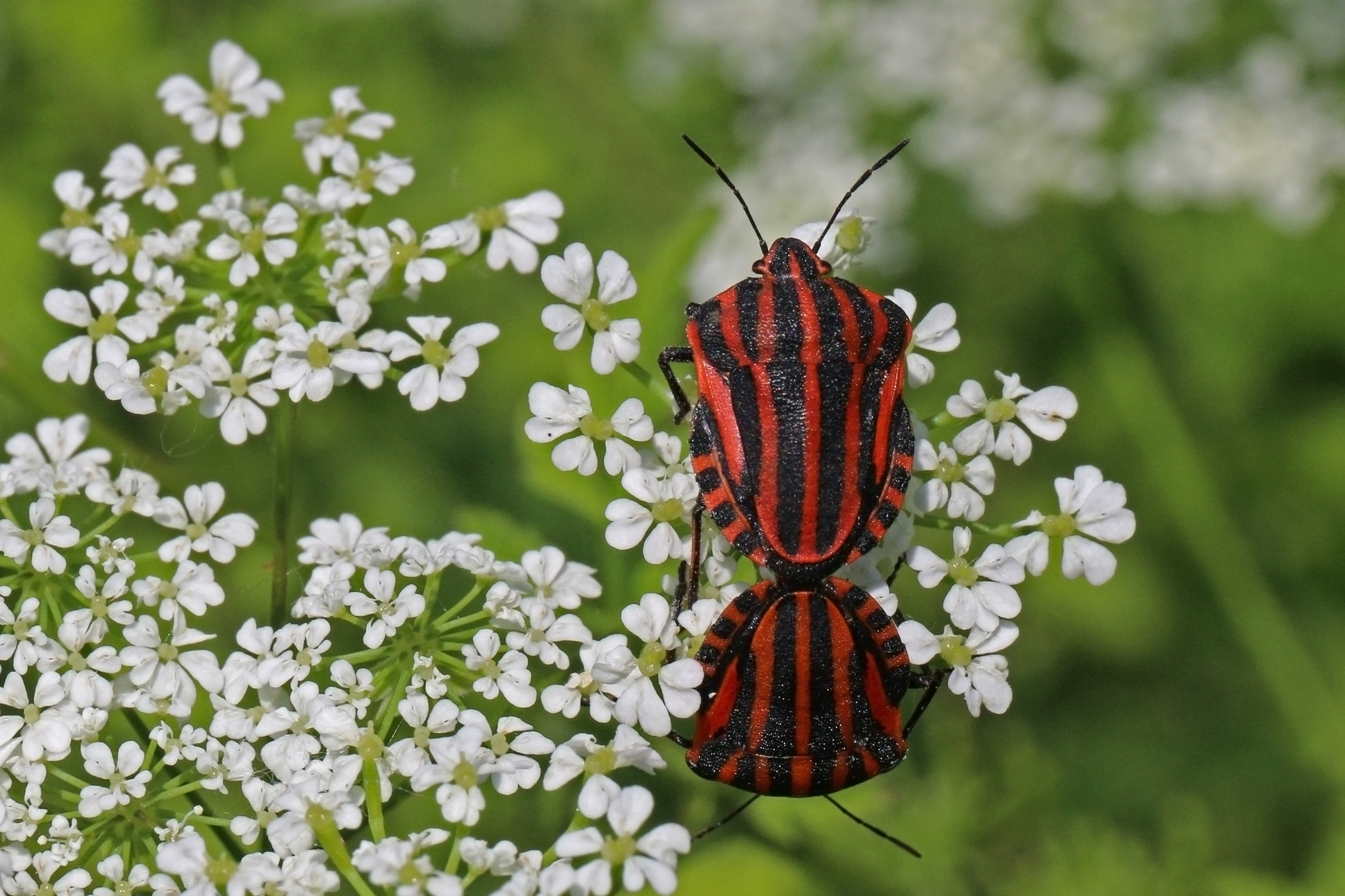
mating (dorsal view)

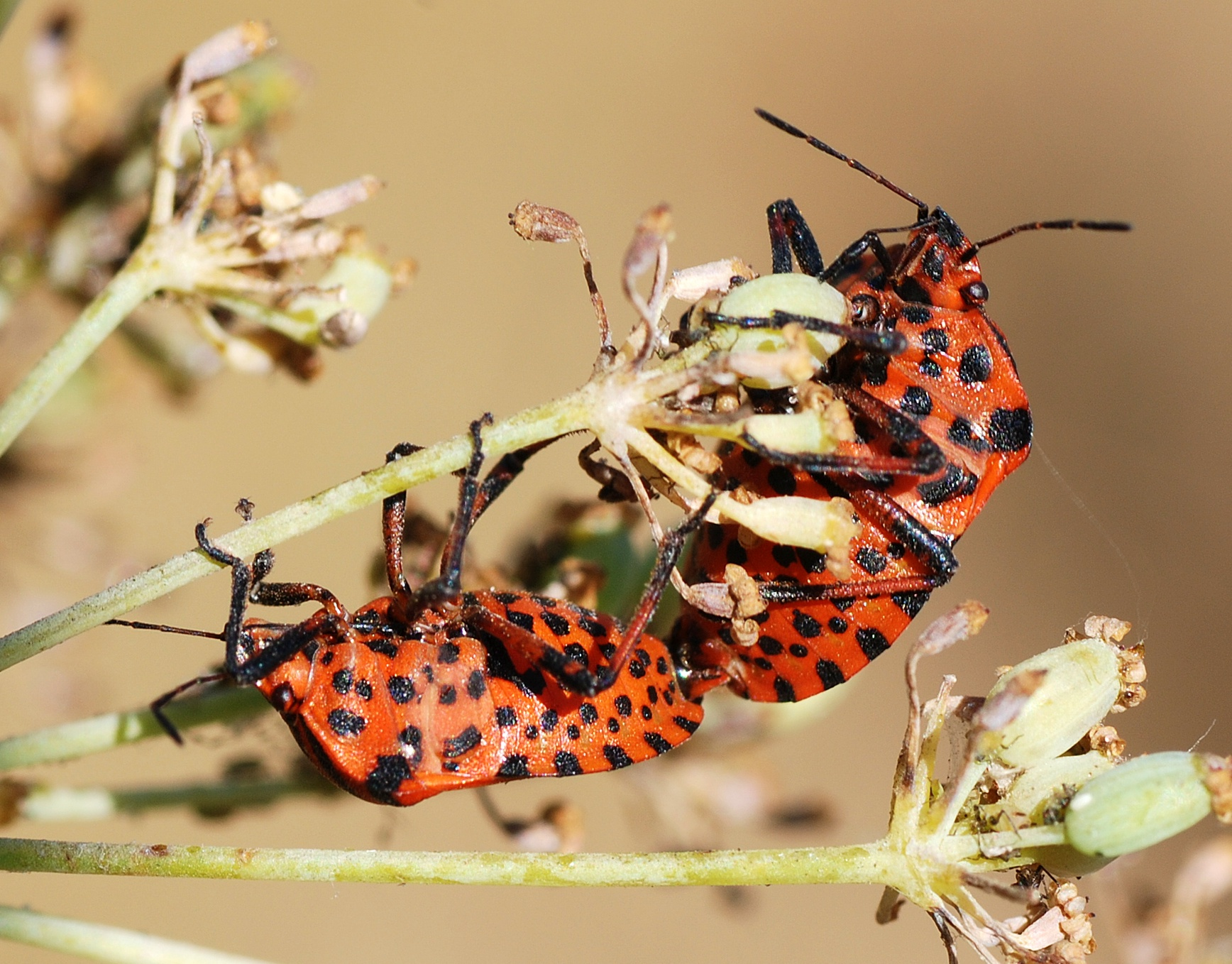
mating (ventral view)

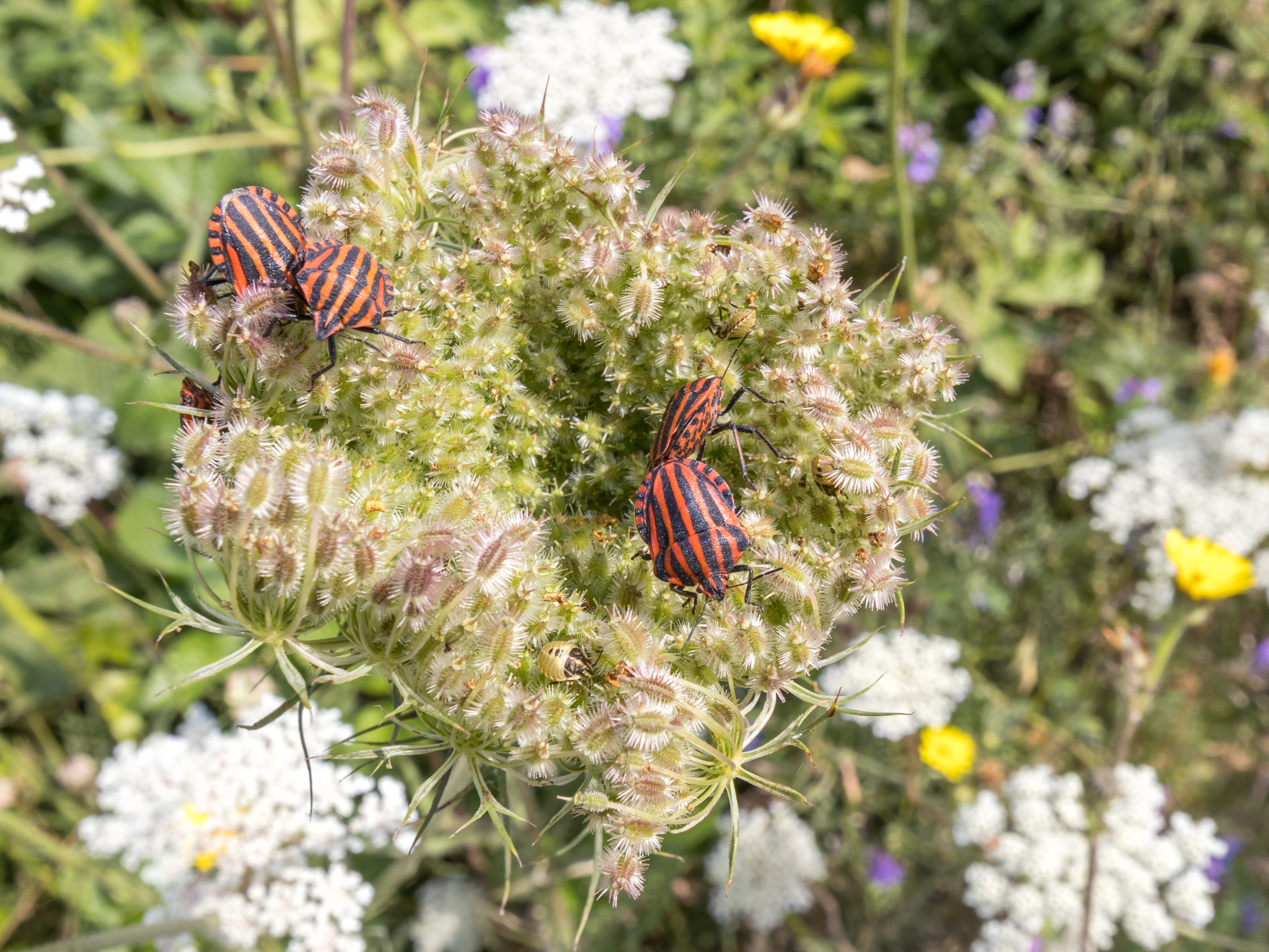
On wild carrots (Daucus).
