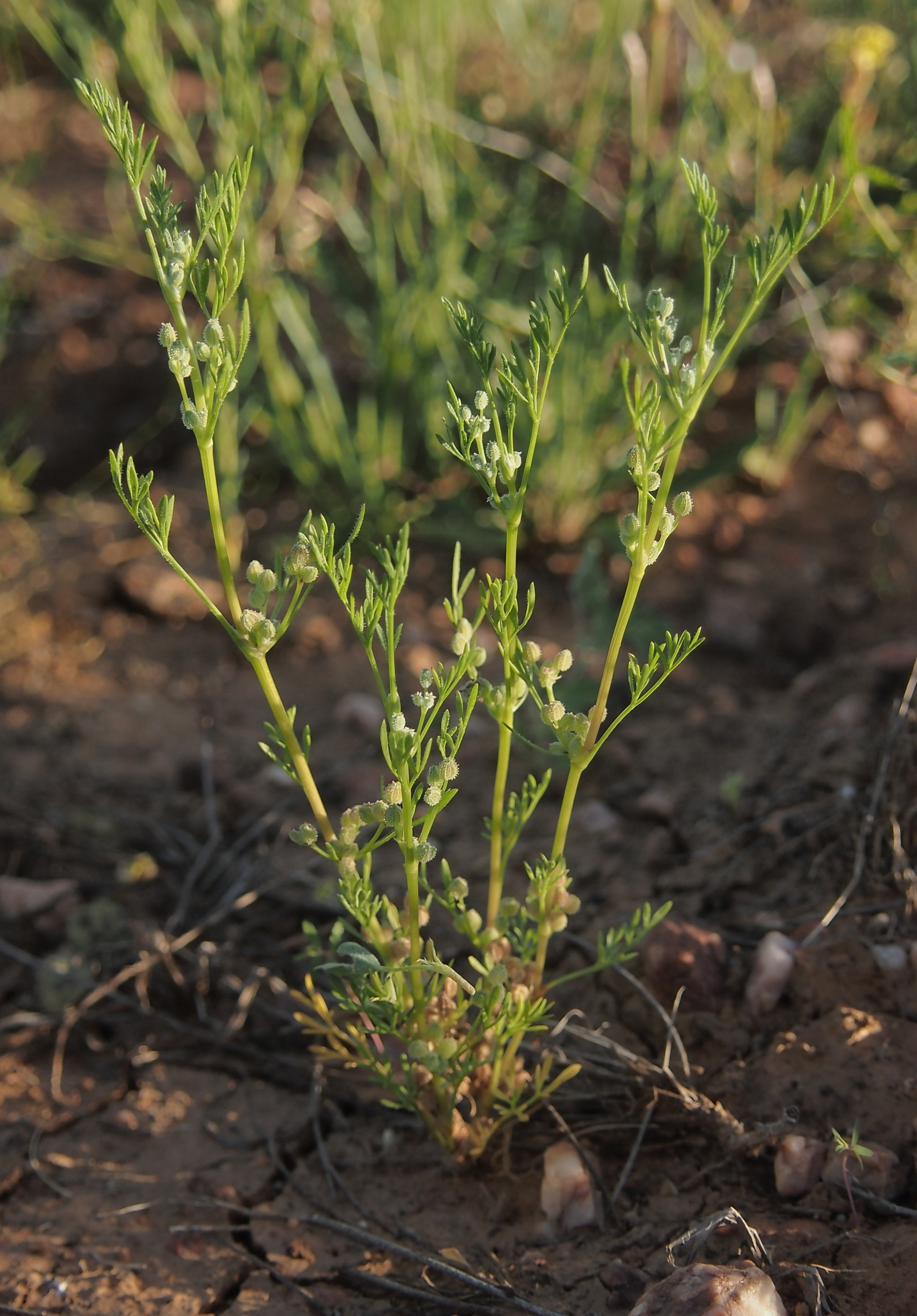

Scientific classification
- Kingdom: Plantae
- Clade: Tracheophytes
- Clade: Angiosperms
- Clade: Eudicots
- Clade: Asterids
- Order: Apiales
- Family: Apiaceae
- Genus: Daucus
- Species: D. glochidiatus

Binomial name
- Daucus glochidiatus (Labill.) Fisch., C.A.Mey. & Ave-Lall.

= Daucus glochidiatus =

Species of plant

Daucus glochidiatus, commonly known as Australian carrot, Austral carrot or native carrot, is a species of herb in the flowering plant family Apiaceae. It is native to Australia and New Zealand.

== Description ==
It grows as an erect annual herb, from 2 to 60 centimetres in height, but rarely over 20 centimetres. Flowers occur in a range of colours.

== Taxonomy ==
This species was first published by Jacques Labillardière in 1805, under the name Scandex glochidiata. It was transferred into Caucalia in 1809, then Daucus in 1844.

== Distribution ==
It occurs throughout Australasia. It is found in every Australian state, and both the North Island and South Island of New Zealand. It also occurs in the Chatham Islands.

It is common in both temperate and arid areas of Australia, but not in tropical areas. It is often found in association with limestone, though it tolerates a variety of soils.
