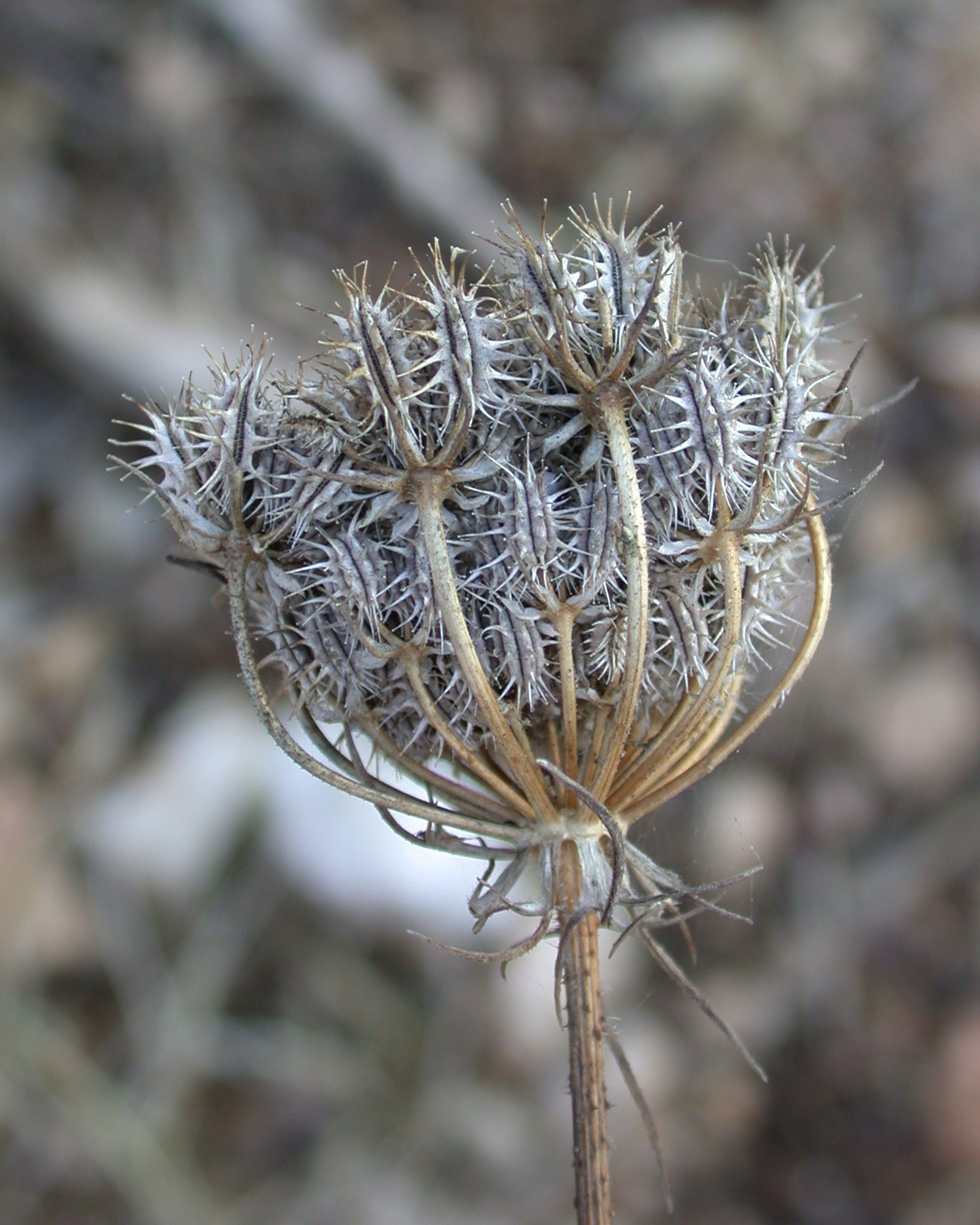
- Fruits showing confluent spine bases

Conservation status
- Data Deficient (IUCN 3.1)

Scientific classification
- Kingdom: Plantae
- Clade: Tracheophytes
- Clade: Angiosperms
- Clade: Eudicots
- Clade: Asterids
- Order: Apiales
- Family: Apiaceae
- Genus: Daucus
- Species: D. broteri

Binomial name
- Daucus broteri Ten.

Synonyms
- Daucus muricatus var. broteroi (Ten.) Burnat; Daucus michelii Caruel; Daucus muricatus Guss.

= Daucus broteri =

Species of flowering plant

Daucus broteri, commonly known as Brotero's carrot, is a wild relative of Daucus carota that can be found across the northeast Mediterranean and the Middle East. It grows in cultivated and plantation-type land.

== Description ==
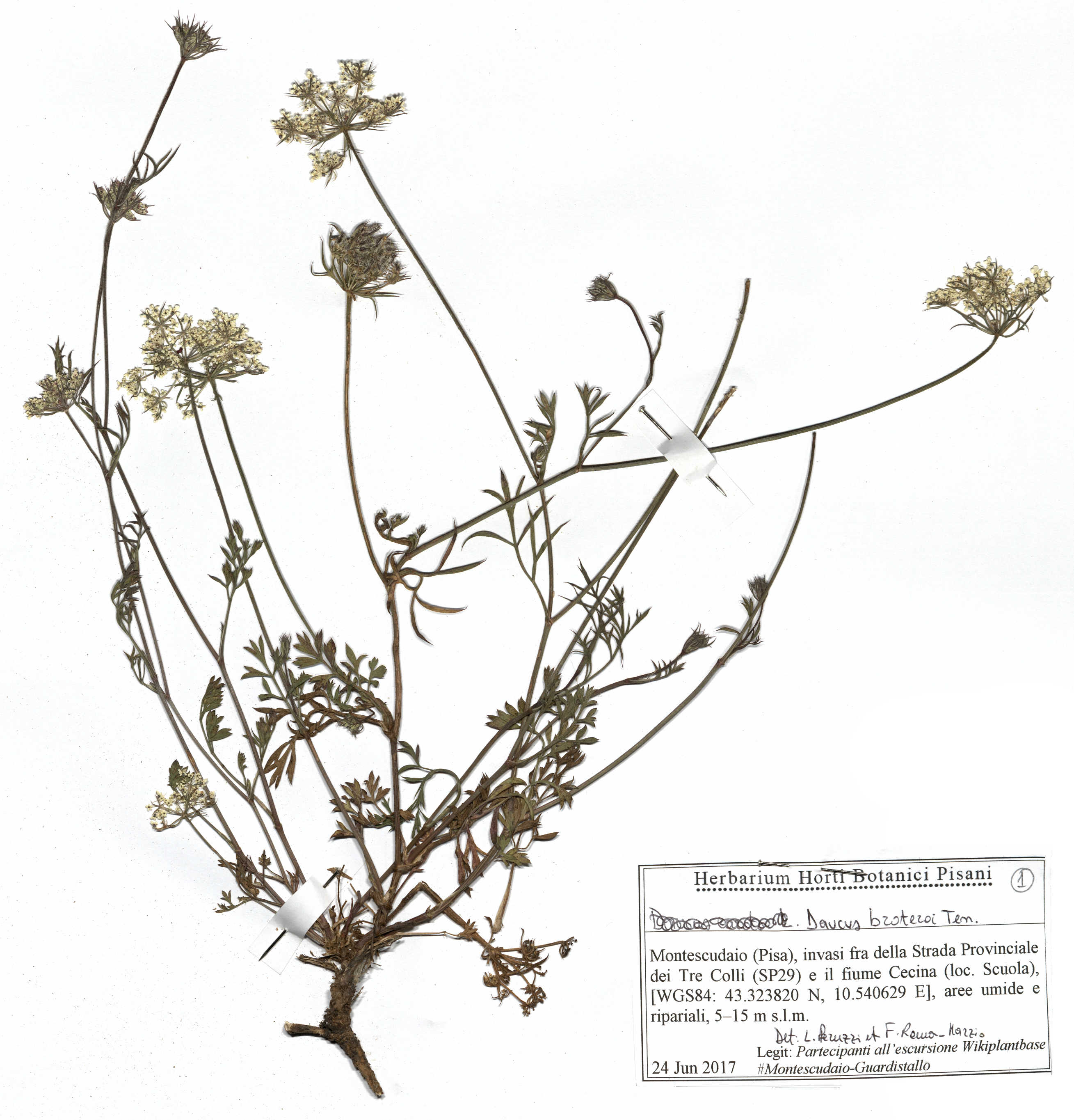
Specimen showing the stem, leaves, and flowers

Daucus broteri forms disc-shaped bunches of white flowers called Umbels that bloom between April and August. It grows up to 10 to 30 cm (3.9 to 11.8 in) with an upright stem that's heavily branched at the base with a single, long taproot and leaves that are bi-pinnate.

== Occurrence ==
Daucus broteri occurs in the eastern Mediterranean region. It grows in fields and on the coast. Its distribution area includes Italy, Albania, Greece, Macedonia, Bulgaria, Crete, the Aegean, European and Asian Turkey, Cyprus, Syria, Lebanon, Jordan, Israel and the Sinai Peninsula.
