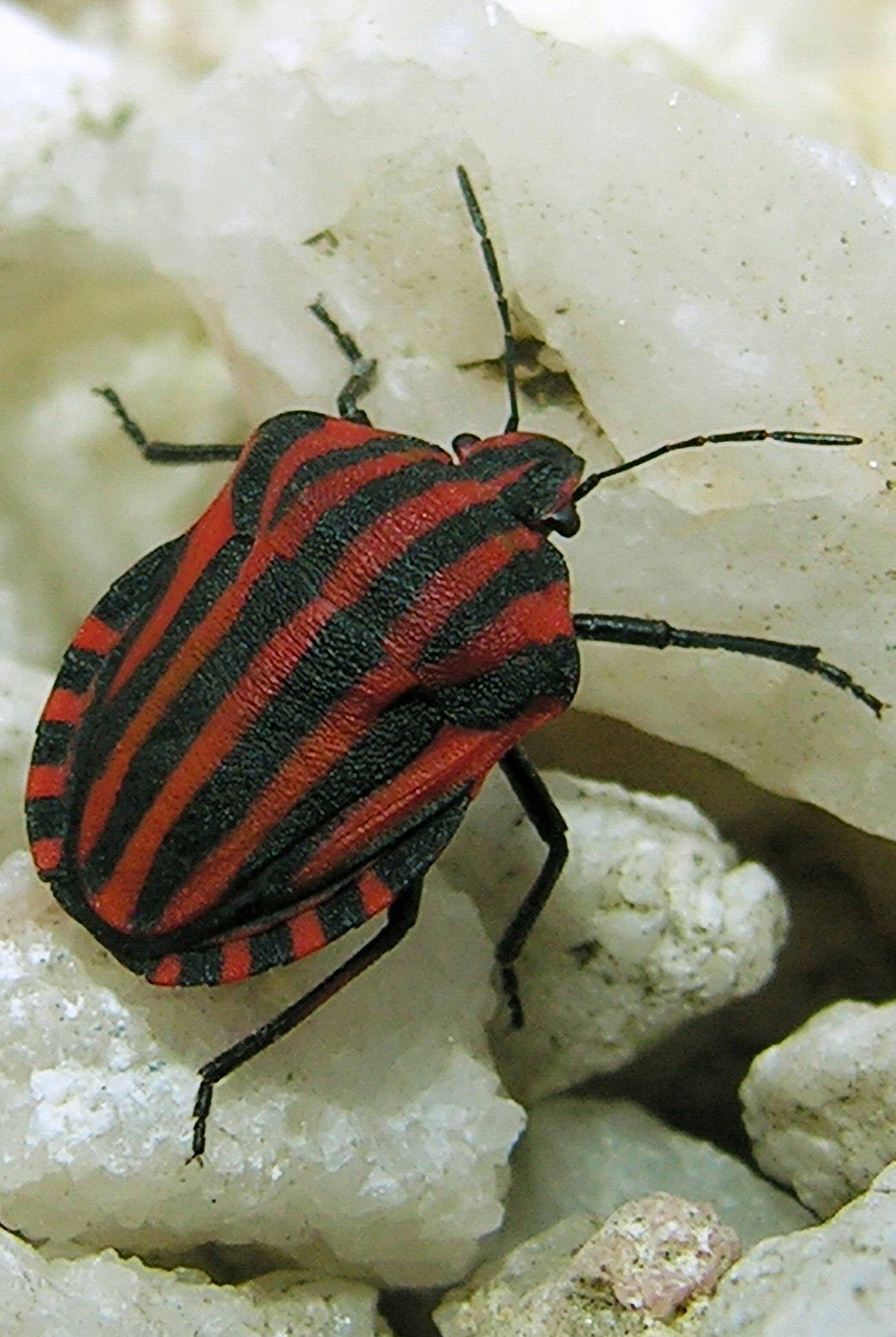
- G. italicum

Scientific classification
- Domain: Eukaryota
- Kingdom: Animalia
- Phylum: Arthropoda
- Class: Insecta
- Order: Hemiptera
- Suborder: Heteroptera
- Family: Pentatomidae
- Subfamily: Podopinae
- Genus: Graphosoma de Laporte, 1832

= Graphosoma =

Genus of true bugs

Graphosoma is a genus bugs in the family Pentatomidae. They are commonly known as striped shield bugs for their distinctive markings.

== Species ==
=== Subgenus Graphosoma ===
- Graphosoma alkani Lodos, 1959
- Graphosoma consimile Horváth, 1903
- Graphosoma interruptum White, 1839
- Graphosoma italicum (Müller, 1766)
- Graphosoma lineatum (Linnaeus, 1758)
- Graphosoma melanoxanthum Horváth, 1903
- Graphosoma rubrolineatum (Westwood, 1837)
- Graphosoma semipunctatum (Fabricius, 1775)
- Graphosoma stali Horváth, 1881

=== Subgenus Graphosomella ===
- Graphosoma inexpectatum Carapezza & Jindra, 2008
