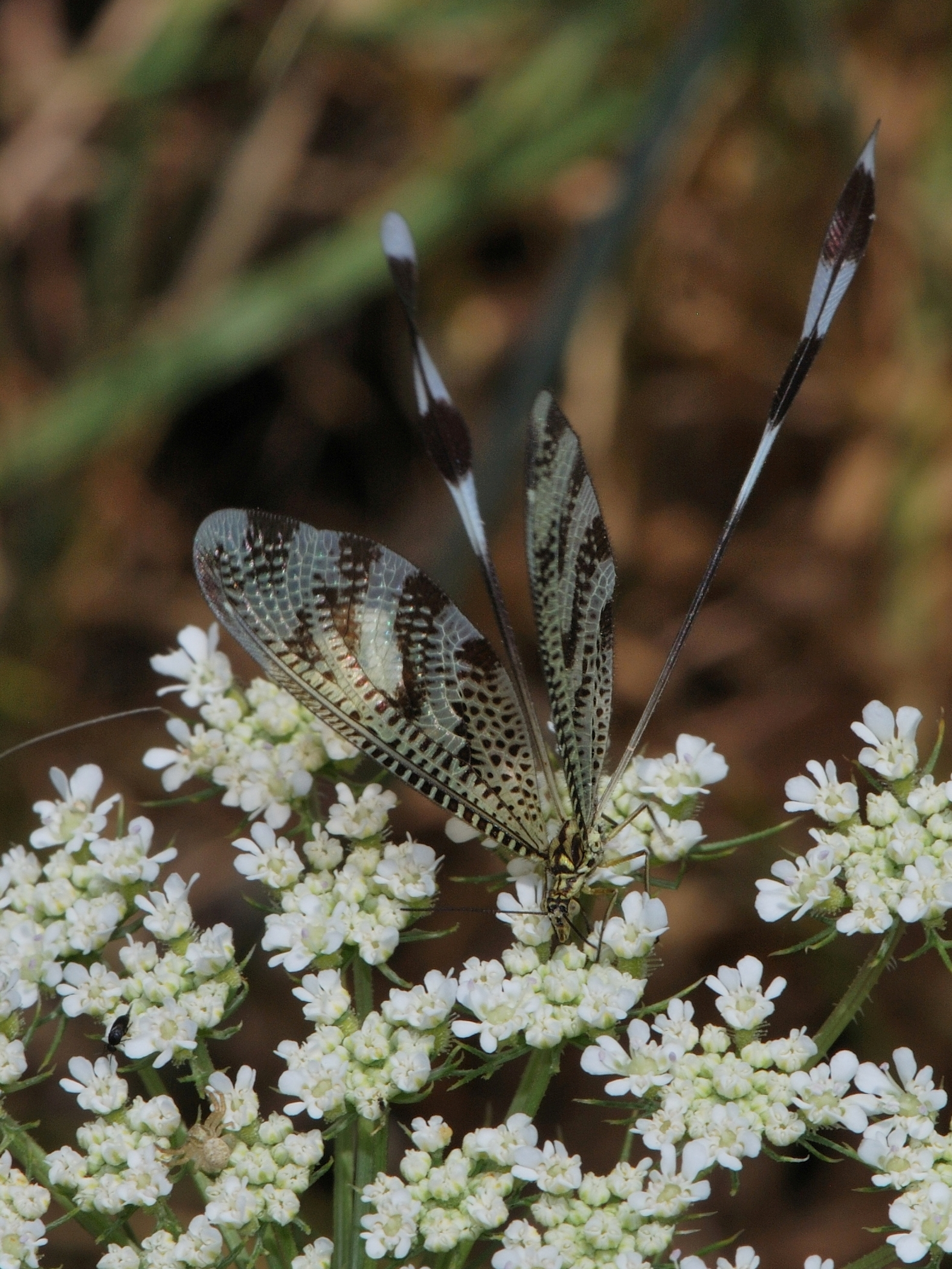
- Nemoptera aegyptiaca foraging on Daucus aureus

Scientific classification
- Kingdom: Plantae
- Clade: Tracheophytes
- Clade: Angiosperms
- Clade: Eudicots
- Clade: Asterids
- Order: Apiales
- Family: Apiaceae
- Genus: Daucus
- Species: D. aureus

Binomial name
- Daucus aureus Desf.

Synonyms
- Platyspermum aureum; Peltactila aurea; Ammi daucoides; Ammiopsis aristidis; Ammiopsis daucoides; Daucus parviflorus

= Daucus aureus =

Species of flowering plant

Daucus aureus is a species of Daucus, in the family Apiaceae.
