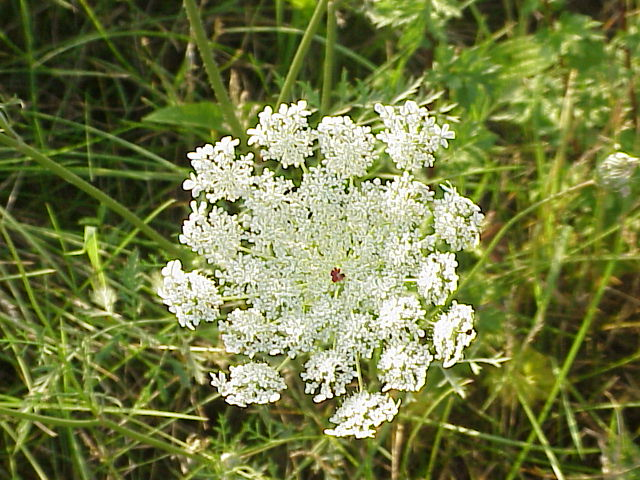
- Daucus carota

Scientific classification
- Kingdom: Plantae
- Clade: Embryophytes
- Clade: Tracheophytes
- Clade: Angiosperms
- Clade: Eudicots
- Clade: Asterids
- Order: Apiales
- Family: Apiaceae
- Subfamily: Apioideae
- Tribe: Scandiceae
- Subtribe: Daucinae
- Genus: Daucus; L. (1753)

Species
- See text

Synonyms
- List: Agrocharis Hochst.; Ammiopsis Boiss.; Babiron Raf.; Ballimon Raf.; Carota Rupr.; Caucaliopsis H.Wolff; Ctenodaucus Pomel; Durieua Boiss. & Reut.; Gynophyge Gilli; Heterosciadium Lange ex Willk.; Melanaton Raf.; Melanoselinum Hoffm.; Meopsis (Calest.) Koso-Pol.; Monizia Lowe; Pachyctenium Maire & Pamp.; Peltactila Raf.; Platydaucon Rchb.; Platyspermum Hoffm.; Pomelia Durando ex Pomel; Pseudorlaya Murb.; Rouya Coincy; Staflinus Raf.; Tetrapleura Parl.; Tiricta Raf.; Tornabenea Parl.

= Daucus =

Genus of flowering plants in the celery family

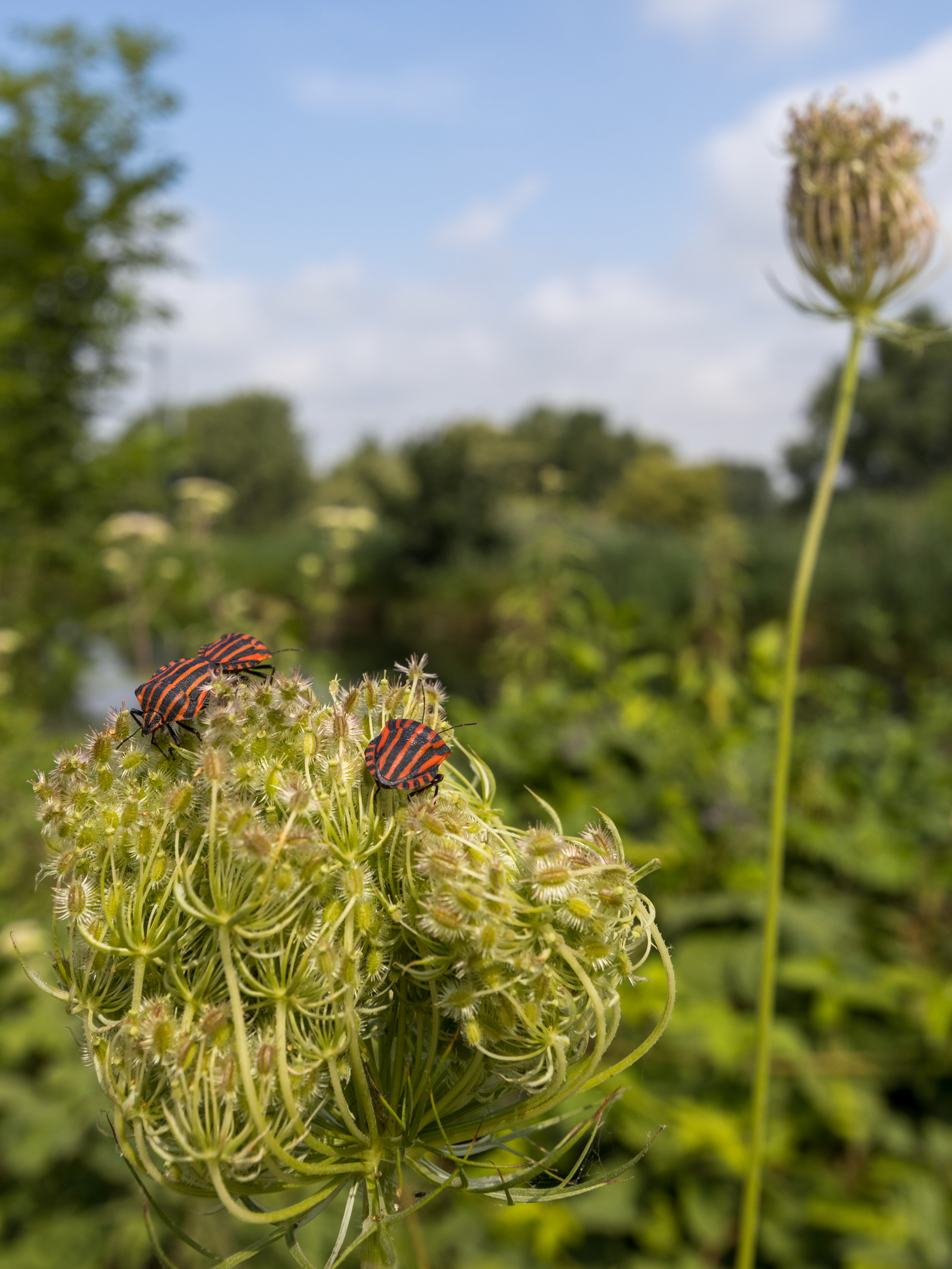
Graphosoma italicum on Daucus carota

Daucus is a worldwide genus of herbaceous plants of the celery family Apiaceae of which the best-known species is the cultivated carrot. Daucus has about 45 species. The oldest carrot fossil is 1.3 Ma, and was found on the island of Madeira in the Atlantic Ocean.

== Description ==
Members of Daucus are distinguished within the family Apiaceae by their leaves which are 2–3 pinnatisect with narrow end sections. The genus primarily consists of biennial plants but also includes some annual plants and some perennial herbs. All Daucus have bristly stems. The inflorescences are umbels. The flowers are mostly white, with bracts and bracteoles. The petals may be pure white, reddish, pinkish or yellowish. They are emarginate above and have pointed, wrapped lobules. The petals are often unequal in size, with petals at the outermost edge of the inflorescence often being larger. The fruit is an ovoid to ellipsoidal schizocarp, cylindrical or compressed, with ciliate primary ribs and secondary ribs with a row of hooked spines. Some species have a small pale or white edible taproot, similar to a radish, which may or may not be bitter in taste.

== Ecology ==
Daucus pollination is carried out by insects, primarily: Lepidoptera, Coleoptera, Diptera, and Hymenoptera. It is a cosmopolitan genus with endemic species on most continents as well as on many islands and in isolated areas. The genus centre is in North Africa and Southwest Asia in the Temperate Zone. Prolonged dry or cold weather tends to retard growth in Daucus species, but the genus as a whole is evolutionarily adaptive to these conditions. Some Daucus species accumulate substantial resources in large underground taproots without impeding plant development. Native to Europe is the carrot, with several subspecies, including subsp. carota (wild carrot), subsp. gummifer (sea carrot) and subsp. sativus, a cultivated form of carrot, also called garden carrot).

Four members of the Daucus genus were examined to determine differences in isoenzyme patterns and plastid DNA. The four were: Daucus carota subspecies sativus cultivar Danvers, D. carota subsp. gummifer, D. capillifolius, and D. pusillus. Although only one form of HSDH (homoserine dehydrogenase) was present in each Daucus line, the rate of migration of HSDH from cv. Danvers was different from that of the others. Multiple isoenzymic forms of ADH were present in each Daucus cultivar. Comparison of endonuclease restriction fragment patterns from plastid DNAs digested by BamHI revealed only small differences between plastid DNAs of cv. Danvers and subsp. gummifer, whereas large differences were observed between cv. Danvers and D. pusillus plastid DNA patterns. No differences were found between cv. Danvers and D. capillifolius plastid DNA patterns when examined using eight different restriction enzymes. The data indicate that specific isoenzyme and organelle DNA restriction fragment patterns will be useful markers for precise identification of genomes of different Daucus species.

== Species ==
45 species are currently accepted.

- Daucus aleppicus J.Thiébaut – Lebanon and Syria
- Daucus aureus Desfontaines – yellow fruit's carrot, golden carrot; Mediterranean basin and Canary Islands
- Daucus bicolor Sm.
- Daucus biseriatus Murb. – Algeria and Morocco
- Daucus broteri Tenore – Brotero's carrot; southeastern Europe to Iran
- Daucus carota L. – wild carrot, Queen Anne’s lace; Europe, Northern Africa, western and Central Asia, southern China, introduced elsewhere
- Daucus conchitae Greuter – Dodecanese and southwestern Turkey
- Daucus crinitus Desf. – Iberian Peninsula and northwestern Africa
- Daucus decipiens (Schrad. & J.C.Wendl.) Spalik, Wojew., Banasiak & Reduron – Madeira
- Daucus della-cellae (Asch. & Barbey ex E.A.Durand & Barratte) Spalik, Banasiak & Reduron – Libya
- Daucus durieua Lange – Durieu's carrot; Canary Islands, Iberian Peninsula, North Africa, Levant
- Daucus edulis (Lowe) Wojew., Reduron, Banasiak & Spalik – Madeira and Selvagens
- Daucus elegans (Webb ex Bolle) Spalik, Banasiak & Reduron – Canary Islands
- Daucus glaber (Forssk.) Thell. – eastern Mediterranean to northern Iran
- Daucus glochidiatus (Labill.) Fisch., C.A.Mey. & Avé-Lall. – Australia and New Zealand
- Daucus gracilis Steinh. – Algeria
- Daucus guttatus Sm. – eastern Mediterranean to Iran
- Daucus hochstetteri A.Braun ex Engl. – Eritrea and Ethiopia
- Daucus humilis (Lobin & K.H.Schmidt) Rivas Mart., Lousã, J.C.Costa & Maria C.Duarte – Cape Verde
- Daucus incognitus (C.Norman) Spalik, Reduron & Banasiak – eastern tropical Africa from Ethiopia to Mozambique
- Daucus insularis (Parl.) Spalik, Wojew., Banasiak & Reduron – Cape Verde
- Daucus involucratus Sm. – southern and eastern Greece to Crete and western and southern Turkey, Cyprus, and central Israel
- Daucus jordanicus Post Libya, and Syria to Jordan
- Daucus mauritii (Sennen ex Maire) Sennen – northern Morocco
- Daucus melananthus (Hochst.) Reduron, Spalik & Banasiak – central and eastern tropical Africa, Yemen, Madagascar, and South Africa
- Daucus microscias Bornm. & Gauba – northern Iraq to northwestern and north-central Iran
- Daucus minusculus Pau ex Font Quer – Morocco, Portugal, and Sardinia
- Daucus mirabilis (Maire & Pamp.) Reduron, Banasiak & Spalik – northeastern Libya
- Daucus montanus Humb. & Bonpl. ex Spreng. – Mexico to Central America and the Andes
- Daucus muricatus (L.) L. – Azores and western and central Mediterranean
- Daucus pedunculatus (Baker f.) Banasiak, Spalik & Reduron – eastern tropical Africa from central Ethiopia to Mozambique
- Daucus pumilus (L.) Hoffmanns. & Link – Mediterranean basin and the Canary Islands
- Daucus pusillus Michx. (syn. D. arcanus F.García Mart. & Silvestre) – American wild carrot; western Canada to northern Mexico and the southeastern US, and southeastern Brazil to southern South America
- Daucus reboudii Coss. ex Batt. – northern Algeria and Tunisia
- Daucus ribeirensis (K.H.Schmidt & Lobin) Rivas Mart., Lousã, J.C.Costa & Maria C.Duarte – Cape Verde
- Daucus rouyi Spalik & Reduron – Corsica, Sardinia, Algeria, and Tunisia
- Daucus sahariensis Murb. – Morocco to Libya and Sinai
- Daucus setifolius Desf. – southern Spain and northwestern Africa
- Daucus setulosus Guss. ex DC. – southeastern Europe to western Turkey, Syria and Lebanon, and northwestern Libya
- Daucus subsessilis Boiss. – Cyprus, the Levant, southern Iran, and the northeastern Arabian Peninsula
- Daucus syrticus Murb. – Tunisia, Libya, and northern Egypt
- Daucus tenuisectus Coss. ex Batt. – southwestern Morocco
- Daucus virgatus (Poir.) Maire – Algeria and Tunisia

== Allergenicity ==
Daucus has an OPALS allergy scale rating of 10 out of 10, indicating extremely high potential to cause allergic reactions.
