= Lereschia =

Scientific classification
- Kingdom: Plantae
- Clade: Tracheophytes
- Clade: Angiosperms
- Clade: Eudicots
- Clade: Asterids
- Order: Apiales
- Family: Apiaceae
- Subfamily: Apioideae
- Tribe: Oenantheae
- Genus: Lereschia; Boiss.
- Species: L. thomasii

Binomial name
- Lereschia thomasii (Ten.) Boiss.

Synonyms
- Cryptotaenia thomasii (Ten.) DC.; Deringa thomasii (Ten.) Koso-Pol.; Pimpinella thomasii (Ten.) M.Hiroe; Pimpinella thomasii (Ten.) Benth. & Hook.f.; Sison thomasii Ten. (1815) (basionym)

Genus of flowering plants

Lereschia is a genus of flowering plants in the family Apiaceae. It includes a single species, Lereschia thomasii, a perennial endemic to southern Italy.
