= Daucus elegans =

Scientific classification
- Kingdom: Plantae
- Clade: Tracheophytes
- Clade: Angiosperms
- Clade: Eudicots
- Clade: Asterids
- Order: Apiales
- Family: Apiaceae
- Genus: Daucus
- Species: D. elegans

Binomial name
- Daucus elegans (Webb ex Bolle) Spalik, Banasiak & Reduron

Synonyms
- Cryptotaenia elegans Webb ex Bolle; Myrrhodes elegans (Webb ex Bolle) Kuntze

Species of flowering plant

Daucus elegans, Spanish: perejil de Monteverde (parsley of Monteverde), is a species of flowering plant in the genus Daucus. It is endemic to the Canary Islands.
