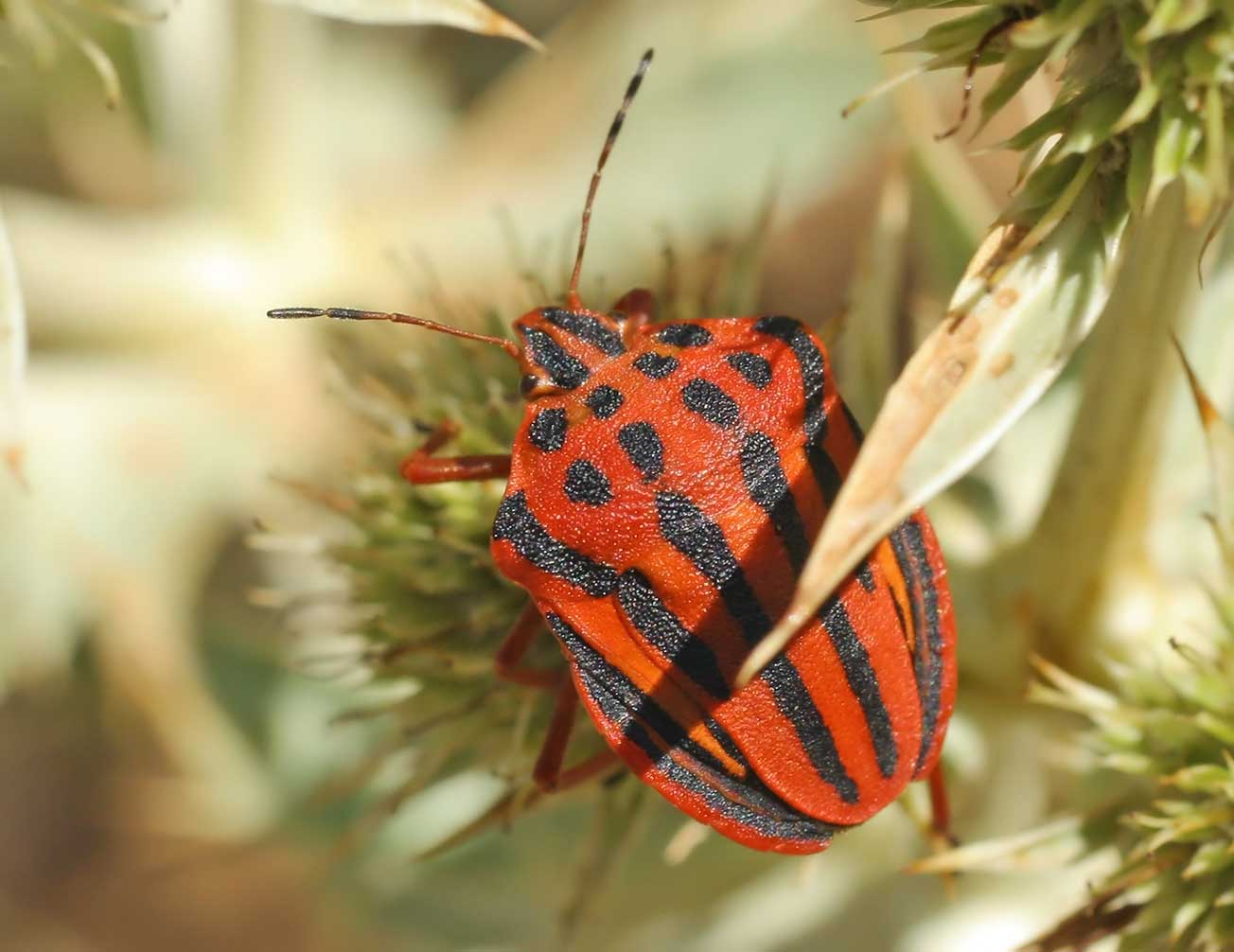

Scientific classification
- Domain: Eukaryota
- Kingdom: Animalia
- Phylum: Arthropoda
- Class: Insecta
- Order: Hemiptera
- Suborder: Heteroptera
- Family: Pentatomidae
- Genus: Graphosoma
- Species: G. semipunctatum

Binomial name
- Graphosoma semipunctatum (Fabricius, 1775)

Synonyms
- List: Cimex semipunctatus Fabricius, 1775; Graphosoma wilsoni White, 1839; Scutellera semipunctata v. persica Ferrari, 1874; Graphosoma semipunctatum v. decipiens Ferrari, 1892; Graphosoma creticum Horváth, 1909; Graphosoma semipunctatum v. anceps Horváth, 1909; Graphosoma semipunctatum v. subaequale Horváth, 1909; Graphosoma creticum v. hemistictum Horváth, 1909; Graphosoma semipunctatum v. furciferum Royer, 1909; Graphosoma semipunctatum v. melanicum Bergevin, 1909; Graphosoma semipunctatum v. pallidum Bergevin, 1909; Graphosoma semipunctatum v. incompletum Fuente, 1918; Graphosoma semipunctatum ab. uniseriatum Fuente, 1925; Graphosoma semipunctatum f. balcanica Hoberlandt, 1939; Graphosoma semipunctatum f. confluens Hoberlandt, 1939; Graphosoma semipunctatum f. confuta Hoberlandt, 1939; Graphosoma semipunctatum f. contexta Hoberlandt, 1939

= Graphosoma semipunctatum =

Species of true bug

Graphosoma semipunctatum is a species of true bug living exclusively in the Mediterranean region. The form living on the island of Crete has sometimes been given the name G. creticum.

It is very close to Graphosoma italicum. It can be distinguished from G. italicum by black dots along the pronotum instead of lines, and the mostly orange legs.

They are found abundantly on plants in the family Apiaceae. Its red color serves to warn its predators that it is not palatable.
