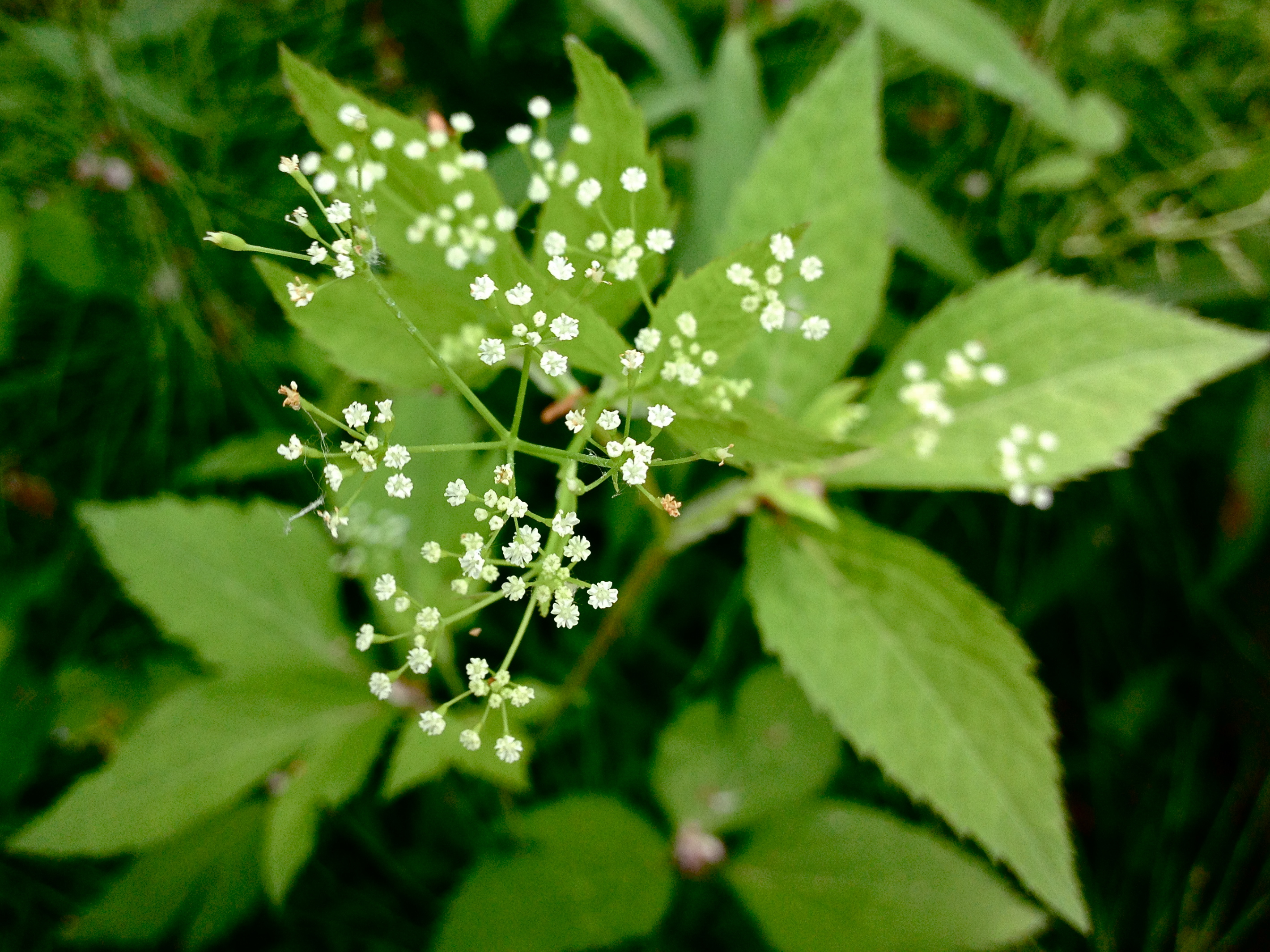

Conservation status
- Secure (NatureServe)

Scientific classification
- Kingdom: Plantae
- Clade: Embryophytes
- Clade: Tracheophytes
- Clade: Spermatophytes
- Clade: Angiosperms
- Clade: Eudicots
- Clade: Asterids
- Order: Apiales
- Family: Apiaceae
- Genus: Cryptotaenia
- Species: C. canadensis

Binomial name
- Cryptotaenia canadensis (L.) DC.
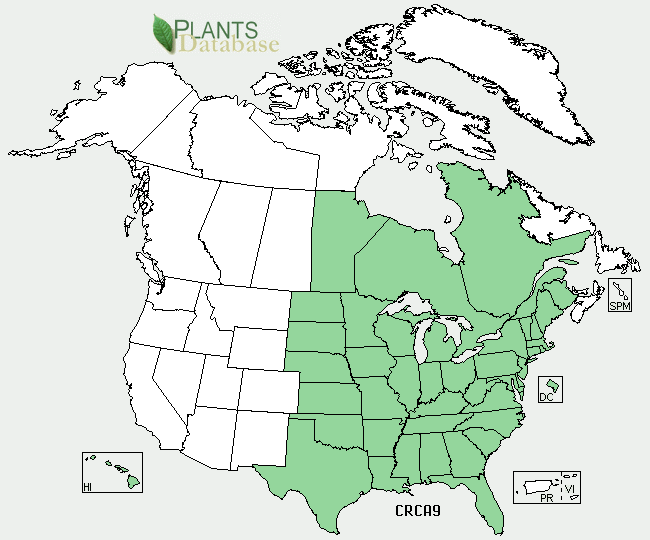
- Natural range in North America

= Cryptotaenia canadensis =

Canadian honewort

Species of flowering plant

Cryptotaenia canadensis, the Canadian honewort, is a perennial plant species native to the eastern United States and eastern Canada. Its young leaves and stems can be used as a boiled green or seasoning similar to parsley. The parsnip like roots can be cooked and eaten.
