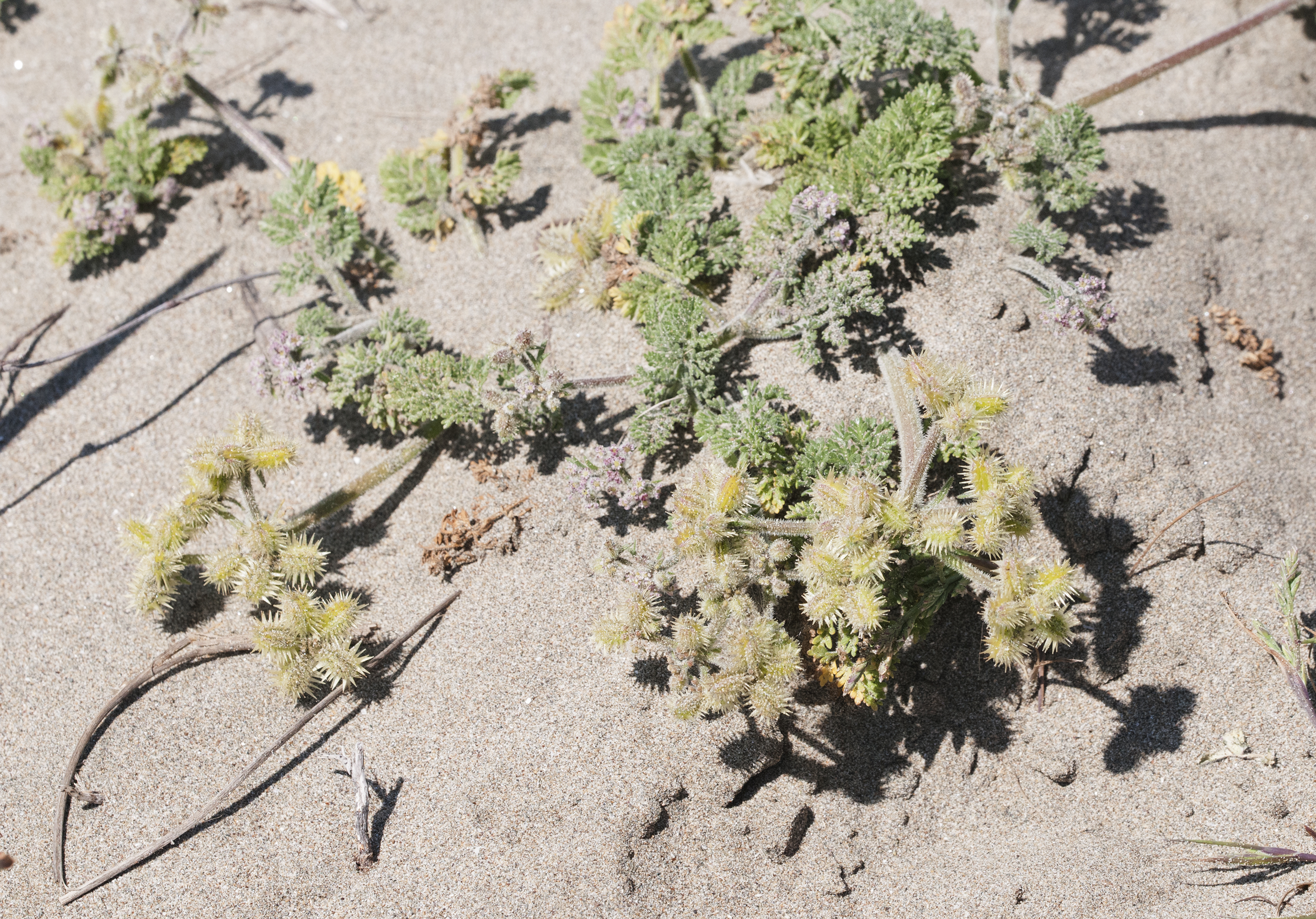

Scientific classification
- Kingdom: Plantae
- Clade: Tracheophytes
- Clade: Angiosperms
- Clade: Eudicots
- Clade: Asterids
- Order: Apiales
- Family: Apiaceae
- Genus: Daucus
- Species: D. pumilus

Binomial name
- Daucus pumilus (L.) Hoffmanns. & Link

Synonyms
- List: Caucalis cretica Salzm. ex Boiss.; Caucalis maritima Gouan; Caucalis pumila L.; Daucus maritimus (L.) Gaertn.; Daucus microphyllus C.Presl ex DC.; Daucus pusillus var. microphyllus (C.Presl ex DC.) Torr. & A.Gray; Orlaya bubania Philippe; Orlaya cretica Nyman; Orlaya maritima (L.) W.D.J.Koch; Orlaya pumila (L.) Halácsy; Pseudorlaya maritima (L.) Murb.; Pseudorlaya pumila (L.) Grande; Pseudorlaya pycnacantha H.Lindb.

= Daucus pumilus =

Species of plant

Daucus pumilus is a species of plants in the carrot family Apiaceae.

== Distribution ==
This species is native to the Canary Islands, but is found throughout the Mediterranean region, including Southern Europe, North Africa and the Levant.

In Maltese, it is called Zunnarija tar-ramel (Sand Carrot), and it reported to be very uncommon.
